= MBK Entertainment discography =

This is a list of albums released under MBK Entertainment, formerly known as Core Contents Media. In 2022, MBK Entertainment closed and all its artists were moved to PocketDol Studio.

The company was home to multiple artists including T-ara, SeeYa, Coed School, DIA, and Davichi.

== 2006 ==
Released	Title	Artist	Format	Language
February 24	The First Mind	SeeYa	CD, digital download	Korean

== 2007 ==
Released	Title	Artist	Format	Language
February 2	All Star: Composer Jo Young-soo Project Album 1st	SeeYa	CD, digital download	Korean
May 25	Lovely Sweet Heart	SeeYa	CD, digital download	Korean

== 2008 ==
Released	Title	Artist	Format	Language
January 2	California Dream	SeeYa	CD, digital download	Korean
January 28	Amaranth	Davichi	CD, digital download	Korean
March 20	All Star: 2nd album Vol. 4	SeeYa	CD, digital download	Korean
April 2	Sad Promise	Davichi	Digital download	Korean
May 29	Blue Moon	Color Pink (SeeYa, Davichi & Black Pearl)	Digital download	Korean
July 7	Vivid Summer Edition	Davichi	CD, digital download	Korean
September 26	Brilliant Change	SeeYa	CD, digital download	Korean

== 2009 ==
Released	Title	Artist	Format	Language
February 27	Davichi in Wonderland	Davichi	CD, digital download	Korean
May 6	Women's Generation	SeeYa, Davichi & T-ara	Digital download	Korean
July 27	Lies	T-ara	CD, digital download	Korean
September 15	TTL (Time to Love)	T-ara & Supernova	Digital download	Korean
October 9	TTL Listen 2	T-ara & Supernova	Digital download	Korean
November 9	Rebloom	SeeYa	CD, digital download	Korean
December 4	Absolute First Album	T-ara	CD, digital download	Korean

== 2010 ==
Released	Title	Artist	Format	Language
January 7	Wonder Woman	SeeYa, Davichi & T-ara	Digital download	Korean
February 23	I Go Crazy Because of You	T-ara	Digital download	Korean
March 3	Breaking Heart	T-ara	CD, digital download	Korean
May 10	Innocence	Davichi	CD, digital download	Korean
July 29	Choo Young-soo All Star - Davichi	Davichi	Digital download	Korean
September 30	Too Late	Co-ed School	Digital download	Korean
October 19	Bbiribbom Bberibbom	Co-ed School	Digital download	Korean
October 28	Something That Is Cheerful and Fresh	Co-ed School	CD, digital download	Korean
November 23	Wae Ireoni?	T-ara	Digital download	Korean
December 13	Temptastic	T-ara	CD, digital download	Korean

== 2011 ==
Released	Title	Artist	Format	Language
January 21	See You Again	SeeYa	CD, digital download	Korean
February 11	Lip Stains	5Dolls	Digital download	Korean
February 16	Charming Five Girls	5Dolls	CD, digital download	Korean
March 28	Elegy Nouveau	Yangpa	CD, digital download	Korean
May 11	Club Remix Time to Play	5Dolls	CD, digital download	Korean
June 29	John Travolta Wannabe	T-ara	CD, digital download	Korean
August 2	Roly-Poly in Copacabana	T-ara	CD, digital download	Korean
August 29	Love Delight	Davichi	CD, digital download	Korean
November 11	Black Eyes	T-ara	CD, digital download	Korean

== 2012 ==
Released	Title	Artist	Format	Language
January 3	Funky Town	T-ara	CD, digital download	Korean
February 7	Love Call With Davichi	Davichi	Digital download	Korean
February 14	Hommage to Lovey-Dovey	Speed	Digital download	Korean
February 24	T-ara.com DVD Box 1	T-ara	DVD	Japanese
March 3	T-ara.com DVD Box 2	T-ara	DVD	Japanese
April 4	Cry Cry & Lovey-Dovey Music Video Collection	T-ara	DVD	Japanese
May 9	Together	Yangpa	CD, digital download	Korean
May 15	We Became Gang	Gangkiz	CD, digital download	Korean
May 23	Lovey-Dovey	T-ara	CD, digital download	Japanese
May 23	Round And Round	T-ara	Digital download	Korean
June 6	Jewelry Box	T-ara	CD, digital download	Japanese
June 22	MaMa	Gangkiz	CD, digital download	Korean
July 3	Day By Day	T-ara	CD, digital download	Korean
September 8	Mirage	T-ara	CD, digital download	Korean
October 10	T-ara's Best of Best 2009-2012: Korean ver.	T-ara	CD + DVD	Japanese
October 15	T-ara's Free Time in Paris & Swiss	T-ara	CD, digital download	Korean
November 12	Good to Seeya	SeeYa	CD, digital download	Korean
December 5	T-ARA JAPAN TOUR 2012 ~Jewelry box~ LIVE IN BUDOKAN	T-ara	DVD	Japanese
December 6	Love U	SeeYa	CD, digital download	Korean

== 2013 ==
Released	Title	Artist	Format	Language
January 15	Superior Speed	Speed	CD, digital download	Korean
February 20	Blow Speed	Speed	CD, digital download	Korean
March 18	Mystic Ballad Pt. 2		CD, digital download	Korean
April 26	T-ara no Ikemen Tachi DVD-BOX I	T-ara	DVD	Japanese
April 29	Jeon Won Diary	T-ara N4	CD, digital download	Korean
May 31	T-ara no Ikemen Tachi DVD-BOX II	T-ara	DVD	Japanese
June 9	Painkiller	T-ara, The Seeya, Speed, 5dolls	Digital download	Korean
June 26	Like the Wind	QBS	CD, digital download	Japanese
July 3	Memories of Summer	Davichi	Digital download	Korean
July 30	Since 1971	F-ve Dolls	Digital download	Korean
August 8	Treasure Box	T-ara	CD, digital download	Japanese
September 17	First Love	F-ve Dolls	CD, digital download	Korean
October 10	Again	T-ara	CD, digital download	Korean
December 4	Again 1977	T-ara	CD, digital download	Korean
December 11	T-ARA JAPAN TOUR 2013 ～TREASURE BOX～ LIVE IN BUDOKAN	T-ara	DVD	Japanese
December 14	White Winter	T-ara	Digital download	Korean

== 2014 ==
Released	Title	Artist	Format	Language
January 3	Tears	SeeYa	Digital download	Korean
January 21	Love Is	SeeYa	Digital download	Korean
January 29	Remember You	Shannon Williams & Jongkook	Digital download	Korean
February 18	Speed Circus	Speed	CD, digital download	Korean
March 18	Zombie Party	Speed	Digital download	Korean
April 3	Look At Me Now	Speed	CD, digital download	Korean
May 14	Gossip Girls	T-ara	CD, digital download	Japanese
May 20	Never Ever	Jiyeon	CD, digital download	Korean
June 30	Make Up	Hyomin	CD, digital download	Korean
July 22	T-ara Single Complete Best Album Queen of Pops	T-ara	CD + DVD	Japanese
September 11	And & End	T-ara	CD, digital download	Korean
September 24	EDM Sugar Free Edition	T-ara	CD + DVD	Korean, English
October 7	Remix Sugar Free	T-ara with DJ Chukie	Digital download	Korean
November 24	Little Apple	T-ara with Chopsticks Brothers	Digital download	Korean, Chinese
December 1	Daybreak Rain	Shannon	Digital download	Korean
December 26	Breath	Shannon with Vasco and Giriboy	Digital download	Korean
December 28	Crazy Love	SeeYa with LE of EXID	Digital download	Korean

== 2015 ==
Released	Title	Artist	Format	Language
February 10	Don't Forget Me	TS (MBK Project)	Digital download	Korean
March 5	Eighteen	Shannon	CD, digital download	Korean
April 21	U & Me	SeeYa	Digital download	Korean
May 7	I'm Good	Elsie	CD, digital download	Korean, Chinese
June 1	Speed On	Speed	CD, digital download	Korean
July 6	Eastist	Highbrow with Lee Hae-ri	Digital download	Korean
August 3	So Good	T-ara	CD, digital download	Korean, Chinese
August 13	Only For You	Koh Na-young	Digital download	Korean, Chinese
September 14	Do It Amazing	Dia	CD, digital download	Korean, Chinese
October 14	Good Bye	Elsie	Digital download	Korean, Chinese
October 20	My Boyfriend's Friend	Dia	Digital download	Korean
November 12	High Up	Highbrow	Digital download	Korean

== 2016 ==
Released	Title	Artist	Format	Language
March 17	Sketch	Hyomin	CD, digital download	Korean, Mandarin
June 14	Happy Ending	Dia	CD, digital download	Korean
August 28	Flower, Wind and You	Ki Hui-hyeon, Jeon So-mi, Choi Yoo-jung & Kim Chung-ha	Digital download	Korean
September 13	Spell	Dia	CD, digital download	Korean
November 9	Remember	T-ara	CD, digital download	Korean, Mandarin
December 29	First Miracle DIAID I	BinChaenHyunSeu	Digital download	Korean
December 31	First Miracle DIAID II	L.U.B	Digital download	Korean

== 2017 ==
Released	Title	Artist	Format	Language
April 19	YOLO	DIA	CD, digital download	Korean
June 14	What's My Name?	T-ara	CD, digital download	Korean, Mandarin
August 22	Love Generation	DIA	CD, digital download	Korean
October 12	Present	DIA	CD, digital download	Korean

== 2018 ==
Released	Title	Artist	Format	Language
June 24	Hatred Farewell	Shannon	Digital download	Korean
August 9	Summer Ade	DIA	CD, digital download	Korean

== 2019 ==
Released	Title	Artist	Format	Language
March 19, 29	Newtro	DIA	Digital download, CD	Korean
