= List of songs written by Ki Hui-hyeon =

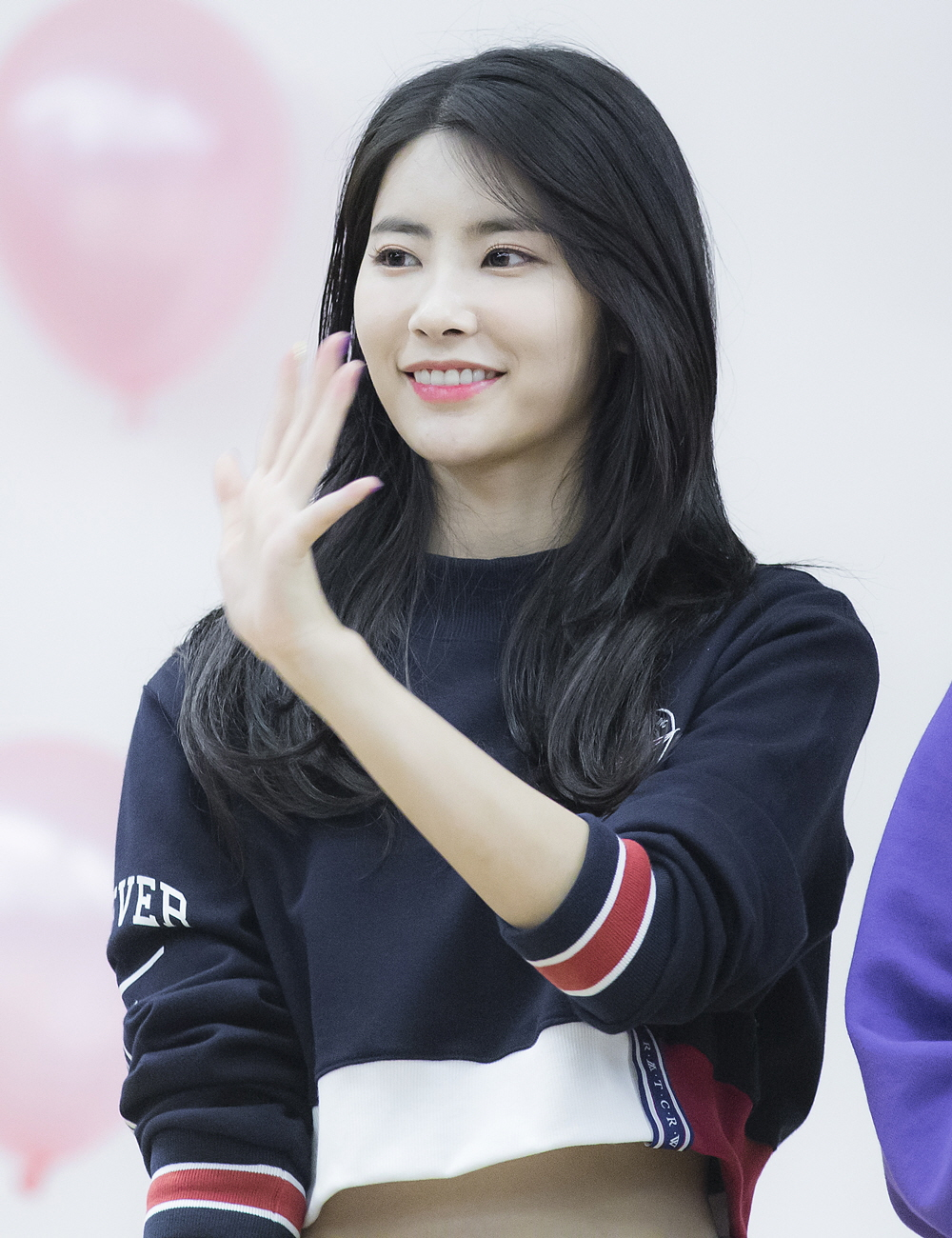
Huihyeon in a fanmeet in 2017

Ki Hui-hyeon (born June 16, 1995), better known by the mononym Huihyun and former stage name Cathy, is a South Korean singer and rapper. She is best known as a member of the South Korean girl group DIA.

All song credits are adapted from the Korea Music Copyright Association's database, unless otherwise noted.

== Solo works ==
Year	Song	Album	Lyrics		Music		Arrangement	
Year	Song	Album	Credited	With	Credited	With	Credited	With
2016	"화가"	Spell	Yes	—	Yes	똘아이박, Peterpan	No	—
2017	"There Is No Time" (featuring Chungha)	YOLO	Yes	Slapstick	Yes	Slapstick	No	—

== DIA and sub-unit works ==
Year	Artist(s)	Song	Album	Lyrics		Music		Arrangement	
Year	Artist(s)	Song	Album	Credited	With	Credited	With	Credited	With
2015	DIA	"Music Lover"	Do It Amazing	No	—	Yes	Shinsadong Tiger	No	—
2016	DIA	"Happy Ending"	Happy Ending	Yes	Iggy, Seo Young-bae	No	—	No	—
2016	DIA	"On The Road"	Happy Ending	Yes	Iggy, Seo Young-bae	No	—	No	—
2016	DIA	"The Trainee"	Happy Ending	Yes	DIA	No	—	No	—
2016	DIA	"Waiting For You" (DIA version)	Happy Ending	Yes	Baek Ye-bin	No	—	No	—
2016	DIA	"7과 4분의3 (널+만나러+가는+길)"	Spell	Yes	Shaun Kim, STAINBOYS, Baek Ye-bin	Yes	Shaun Kim, STAINBOYS	No	Shaun Kim, STAINBOYS
2016	DIA	"Flower, Wind and You" (DIA version)	Spell	Yes	똘아이박, Peterpan	No	—	No	—
2016	DIA	"#더럽" (The Love...)	Spell	Yes	노는어린이, Yoon Young-min, DIA	No	—	No	—
2016	BinChaenHyunSeu	"너는 달 지구"	First Miracle DIAID I	Yes	Eunice, Chaeyeon, Yebin	Yes	Eunice, Chaeyeon, Yebin, 똘아이박, Peter Pan	No	—
2017	DIA	"Will You Go Out With Me?" (나랑 사귈래)	YOLO	Yes	Eunice, Jenny, Yebin, Eunjin, Chaeyeon, Ddoli Park, Peter Pan	Yes	Eunice, Jenny, Yebin, Ddoli Park, Peter Pan	No	—
2017	DIA	"Boyfriend" (남.사.친)	YOLO	Yes	Eunice, Jenny, Yebin, Eunjin, Yoon Young Min, Kim Won Hyun	Yes	Eunice, Jenny, Yoon Young Min, Kim Won Hyun, Kim Dong Ha	No	—
2017	DIA	"April" (사월) (featuring Din Din)	YOLO	Yes	Eunjin, Yebin, Face Of Glory, Jin Ri, Din Din	No	—	No	—
2017	DIA	"Mannequin" (마네킹)	YOLO	Yes	Eunice, Jenny, Eunjin, Yebin, Chaeyeon, Stainboys	Yes	Eunice, Jenny, Yebin, Chaeyeon, Stainboys	No	—
2017	DIA	"Light" (빛)	YOLO	Yes	Eunice, Jenny, Eunjin, Yebin, Eunchae, Ddoli Park, Peter Pan	Yes	Eunice, Jenny, Yebin, Ddoli Park, Peter Pan	No	—
2017	DIA	"Listen To This Song" (이 노래 들어볼래)	YOLO	Yes	Eunjin, Yebin, Face Of Glory, Jin Ri, Din Din	No	—	No	—
2017	DIA	"Not Only You But Spring" (너만 모르나 봄)	YOLO	Yes	Eunjin, Yebin, Eunchae, Kim Won-hyun	No	—	No	—
2017	DIA	"Independence Movement Day" (乾坤坎離)	YOLO	Yes	Eunice, Jenny, Eunjin, Yebin, Chaeyeon, Eunchae	Yes	Eunice, Jenny, Yebin, Ddoli Park, Peter Pan	No	—
2017	DIA	"Will You Go Out With Me?" (2016)	YOLO	Yes	Eunice, Jenny, Eunjin, Yebin, Chaeyeon, Ddoli Park, Peter Pan	Yes	Eunice, Jenny, Yebin, Ddoli Park, Peter Pan	No	—
2017	DIA	"Wanna Date Me" (댄스)	YOLO	Yes	Eunice, Jenny	Yes	Eunice, Jenny, Yebin	No	—
2017	DIA	"Will You Go Out With Me?" (Ballad version)	YOLO	Yes	Eunice, Jenny, Eunjin, Yebin, Chaeyeon, Ddoli Park, Peter Pan	Yes	Eunice, Jenny, Yebin, Ddoli Park, Peter Pan	No	—
2017	DIA	"Will You Go Out With Me?" (instrumental)	YOLO	No	—	Yes	Eunice, Jenny, Yebin, Ddoli Park, Peter Pan	No	—
2017	DIA	"LO OK"	Love Generation	Yes	e.one, Choi Hyun-jun	No	—	No	—
2017	DIA	"#GMGN" (Good Morning & Good Night)	Love Generation	Yes	Stainboys, Eunjin	No	—	No	—
2017	DIA	"Paradise" (파라다이스)	Love Generation	Yes	Stainboys, Eunjin	No	—	No	—
2018	DIA	"Blue Day"	Summer Ade	Yes	Peter Pan, Lee Jun Hwan, Wooki	No	—	No	—
2019	DIA	"5 More Minutes"	Newtro	Yes	Peter Pan, Lee Jun Hwan, RUBATOV	No	—	No	—
2022	DIA	"Rooting for You"	Rooting for You	Yes	Superhuman, Peter Pan	Yes	Superhuman, Jung Da Sol	No	Superhuman

== Other artists ==
Year	Artist(s)	Song	Album	Lyrics		Music		Arrangement	
Year	Artist(s)	Song	Album	Credited	With	Credited	With	Credited	With
2016	Eunchae	"Remember"	Happy Ending	No	—	Yes	Baek Ye-bin	No	—
2022	Soul People	"Winter in Your Eyes" (너의 눈에 겨울)	Winter in Your Eyes	Yes	숲속의 바람, Go Ni, Hong Sin Ri	No	—	No	—
2022	Lee Ju Hyuk	"Meet You at the Laundromat" (세탁소에서 만나요)	Meet You at the Laundromat	Yes	Oh Sung Hun	No	—	No	—
2022	Song Ha Yea	"Don't Be Nice to Me" (함부로 다정하게)	Don't Be Nice to Me	Yes	Oh Sung Hun	No	—	No	—

== Other works ==
Year	Artist(s)	Song	Album	Lyrics		Music		Arrangement	
Year	Artist(s)	Song	Album	Credited	With	Credited	With	Credited	With
2016	Huihyeon, Chungha, Yoojung, Somi	"Flower, Wind and You"	Non-album single	Yes	Peterpan	No	—	No	—
