= Jung Chae-yeon =

South Korean actress and singer (born 1997)

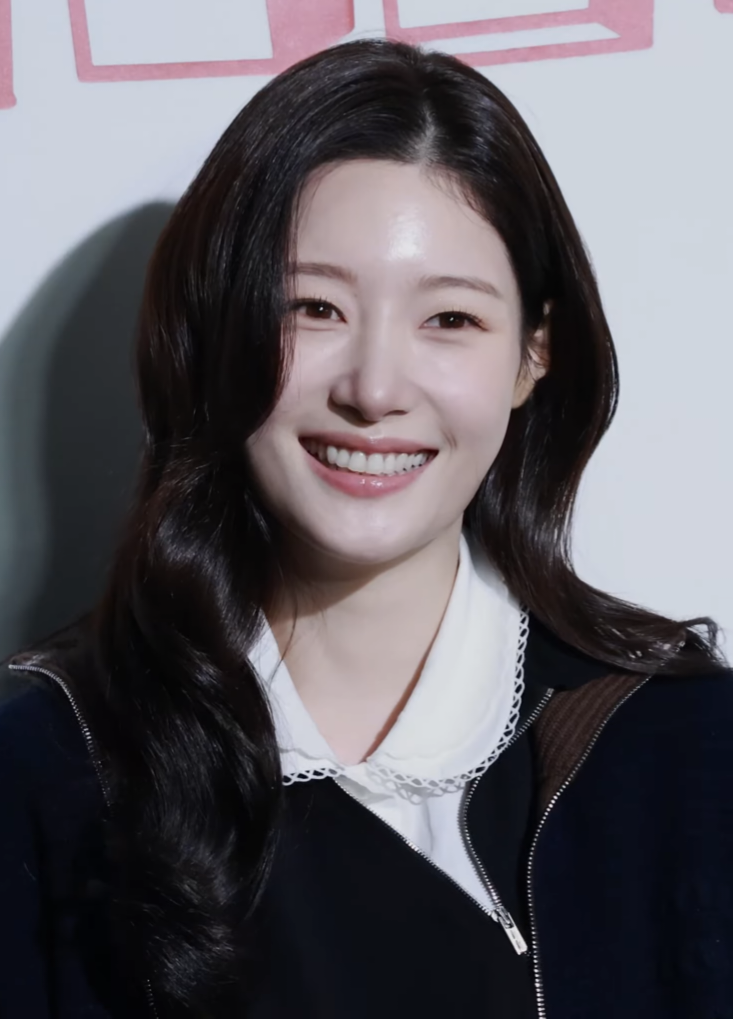
- Jung in November 2025
- Born: December 1, 1997 (age 28); Suncheon, South Korea
- Education: School of Performing Arts Seoul
- Occupations: Actress; singer
- Years active: 2015–present
- Agent: BH Entertainment
- Awards: Full list
- Musical career
- Genre: K-pop
- Instrument: Vocals
- Labels: MBK; YMC (Note: As a member of I.O.I only.); Swing; Studio Blu; PocketDol Studio
- Member of: DIA; BinChaenHyunSeuS
- Formerly of: I.O.I

Korean name
- Hangul: 정채연
- Hanja: 鄭彩娟
- RR: Jeong Chaeyeon
- MR: Chŏng Ch'aeyŏn

Signature
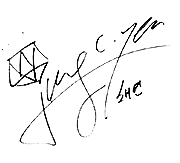

Jung Chae-yeon (Korean: 정채연; born December 1, 1997), known mononymously as Chaeyeon, is a South Korean actress and singer. She is a former member of the girl group DIA and also a former member of a project girl group I.O.I, having finished 7th in the survival show Produce 101. She is currently active as an actress, best known for her lead roles in the television series To. Jenny (2018), My First First Love (2019), The King's Affection (2021), The Golden Spoon (2022), and Family by Choice (2024).

== Early life and education ==
Jung Chae-yeon was born on December 1, 1997, in Suncheon, South Korea. She has a sister named Jeong Si-yeon. She attended School of Performing Arts Seoul from 2013 to 2016, with former DIA member Ahn Eun-jin, where she graduated on February 4, 2016.

== Career ==
=== 2015: Debut with DIA ===
In January 2015, MBK Entertainment announced its plans to debut a new girl group, originally with a strategy to have candidates compete on a reality survival program. Once the idea was scrapped, however, the company decided to select its members internally and the final line-up was revealed with seven members, including Seung-hee, Cathy, Eunice, Jenny, Ye-bin, Eun-jin and Chae-yeon.

DIA released their debut album, Do It Amazing, on September 14, 2015, with the lead single "Somehow" (왠지; Waenji).

=== 2016: Produce 101, I.O.I and acting debut ===
In December 2015, MBK Entertainment announced that Jung temporarily withdrew from the group to join the trainee survival program Produce 101, which she had auditioned for and signed contracts with before DIA officially debuted. She finished 7th overall with 215,338 votes, debuting with the I.O.I project group in May 2016. A week after their debut extended play Chrysalis was released, MBK Entertainment confirmed that Jung will return to DIA for their upcoming comeback in June 2016. YMC Entertainment revealed that she would be absent from I.O.I's sub-unit promotions as well. Her casting in tvN's Drinking Solo was confirmed on June 30, 2016, marking her acting debut.

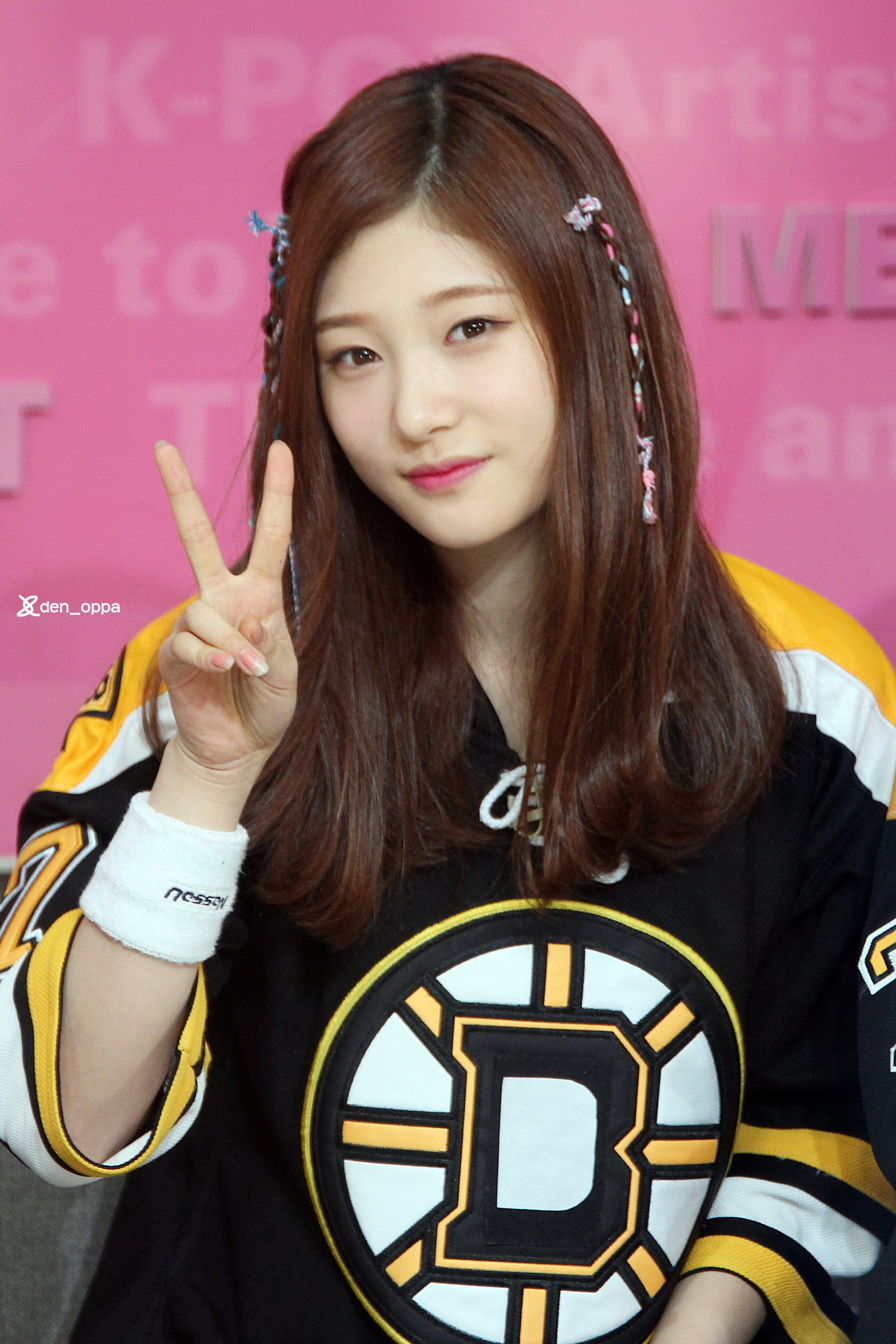
Jung at a meet and greet in 2015

DIA's second extended play, Spell was released on September 13, 2016, with the lead single "Mr. Potter". September 18–24, 2016 was noted for exceptionally busy television work for Jung, starting with bi-weekly broadcasts of Drinking Solo (September 19–20). Her appearance on Hit the Stage with fellow DIA member Eun-jin aired on September 21, 2016, and the premiere of the variety series Go Go with Mr. Paik aired on September 23, 2016, with her starring alongside Shinee's Onew. Combined with idol groups' tendency to perform on each of South Korea's daily music programs, a writer for Daily Sports noted that a viewer could see Jung's face virtually every day. She was revealed as the new face of jewelry brand Lamucha that same week, signing a one-year 200 million won contract.

Jung re-joined I.O.I for their second promotional cycle as a full group, releasing Miss Me? on October 17, 2016, with the lead single "Very Very Very". The October 21, 2016 broadcast of Music Bank marked an incident where due to scheduling conflicts, she performed on the show twice; once with DIA on their final run of televised performances for "Mr. Potter", and again with I.O.I. as they began promotions for "Very Very Very".

In December 2016, Jung was cast in the science fiction web drama 109 Strange Things, co-starring with Choi Tae-joon. She plays the role of senior philosophy student Shin Ki-won whose family takes in KDI-109, a robot from the future. The drama is set to air on Naver TV Cast in early 2017, with six episodes. She began modelling for Jill Stuart New York in January 2017.

=== 2017–present: Acting success, rise of fame, and solo activities ===
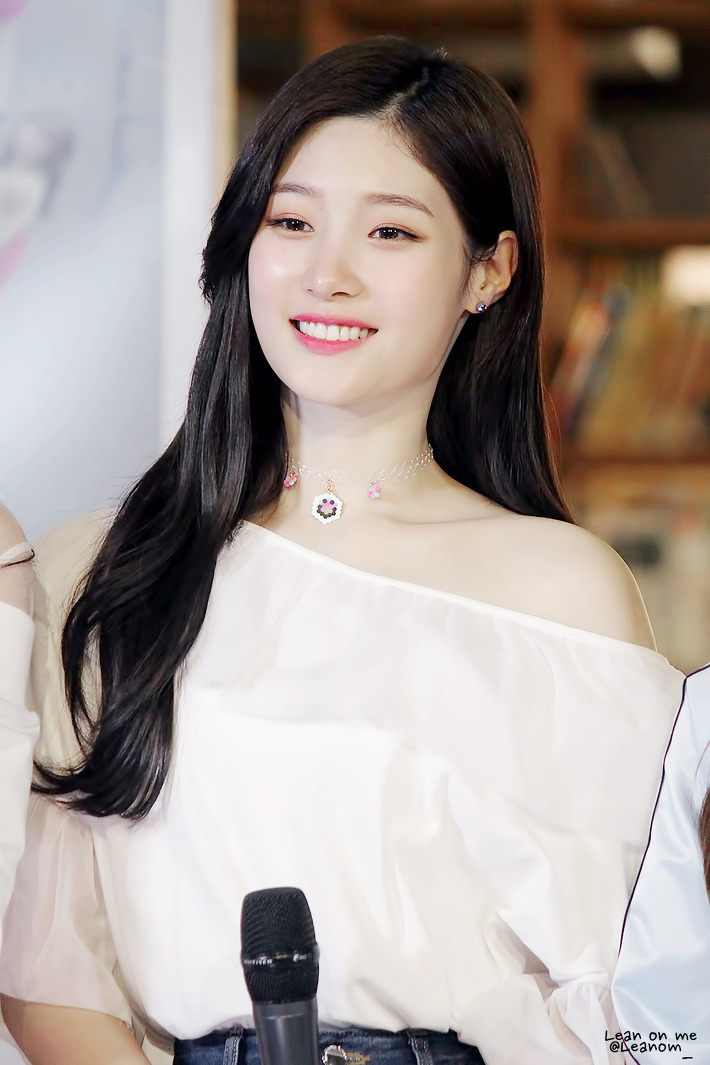
Jung in 2017

In 2017, Jung featured in SBS's romantic fantasy drama Reunited Worlds, playing the younger version of Lee Yeon-hee's character. She then starred in another science fiction web drama I Am, playing an android robot. In December, it was announced that Jung has joined the cast of SBS' reality survival show Law of the Jungle in Patagonia for their Chile special.

In 2018, Jung starred in KBS' weekend drama Marry Me Now, playing the younger version of Jang Mi-hee's character. She was also cast in her first film, Live Again, Love Again, which premiered in February 2018. The same month, Jung was announced as the new MC of SBS' music program Inkigayo. Jung was cast in the KBS music drama To. Jenny, her first leading role on television.

In 2019, Jung starred in the Netflix youth romance drama My First First Love.

On May 4, 2021, Jung and the members of I.O.I celebrated their 5th debut anniversary with a reunion live stream show called "Yes, I Love It!".

In 2022, Jung joined MBC's drama The Golden Spoon, which aired in the summer of 2022. In September, Jung signed an exclusive contract with BH Entertainment.

On December 13, 2023, Jung confirmed to star in a youth series Family by Choice, which aired on October 9, 2024.

== Discography ==
=== Singles ===
Title	Year	Peak chart positions	Sales (DL)	Album
Title	Year	KOR	Sales (DL)	Album
Collaborations
"Our Night is More Beautiful Than Your Day" (우리의 밤은 당신의 낮보다 아름답다) (with Bomi, Namjoo, LE, Seo In-young, Lee Seok-hoon, ₩uNo, Yang Da-il, Brother Su, Chancellor, Kang Min-hee)	2016	89	KOR: 28,346+	Merry Summer
"Fly Day" (with Baek Ji-young, Sunmi, Davichi, Jueun (DIA), Jin Se-yeon, Eunhyuk, NRG, MoonBin (Astro), MJ (Astro), Ooon HALO), Jaeyong (HALO), Heecheon (HALO), Heedo (B.I.G), Gunmin (B.I.G), Jong-up (B.A.P), Youngjae, The One, Johan Kim)	2017	—	—N/a	Fly Day
Soundtrack appearances
"Together" (with Basick, Seunghee, Janey)	2016	—	—N/a	Eat Sleep Eat OST
"Shadow" (with Yezi)	2016	—	—N/a	Wanted OST Part 3
"I'll be your song" (with Kim Sung-cheol)	2018	—	—N/a	To. Jenny OST
"매우매우아름답고환상적인나라" (with Jueun)	2018	—	—N/a	TalesRunner OST
"—" denotes releases that did not chart or were not released in that region.

=== Songwriting credits ===
All song credits are adapted from the Korea Music Copyright Association's database, unless otherwise noted.

Year	Song	Album	Artist	With
2016	"The Trainee"	Happy Ending	DIA	all DIA members
2016	"#더럽"	Spell	DIA	노는어린이, Yoon Young-min, DIA members
2016	"Will You Go Out With Me?"	YOLO	DIA	Eunice, Jenny, Yebin, Eunjin, Huihyeon, Ddoli Park, Peter Pan
2016	"Mannequin"	YOLO	DIA	Eunice, Huihyeon, Jenny, Eunjin, Yebin, Stainboys
2016	"You Are My Flower"	YOLO	DIA	Eunice, Yebin, 79
2016	"Independence Movement Day"	YOLO	DIA	Eunice, Huihyeon, Jenny, Eunjin, Yebin, Eunchae
2016	"Will You Go Out With Me?" (2016)	YOLO	DIA	Eunice, Jenny, Yebin, Eunjin, Huihyeon, Ddoli Park, Peter Pan
2016	"You Are My Flower" (DIA only version)	YOLO	DIA	Eunice, Yebin, 79
2016	"Will You Go Out With Me?" (Ballad version)	YOLO	DIA	Eunice, Jenny, Yebin, Eunjin, Huihyeon, Ddoli Park, Peter Pan
2016	"너는 달 지구"	First Miracle DIAID I	BinChaenHyunSeu	Eunice, Huihyeon, Yebin

== Filmography ==
=== Film ===
Year	Title	Role	Ref.
2018	Live Again, Love Again	Yoon-hee	

=== Television series ===
Year	Title	Role	Notes	Ref.
2016	Drinking Solo	Herself	Cameo	
2017	Reunited Worlds	young Jung Jung-won		
2018	Marry Me Now	young Lee Mi-yeon		
2018	To. Jenny	Kwon Na-ra		
2019	My First First Love	Han Song-yi	Season 1–2	
2021	The King's Affection	Noh Ha-kyung		
2022	The Golden Spoon	Na Joo-hee		
2024	Family by Choice	Yoon Joo-won		
2025	Beyond the Bar	Kang Hyo-min / Kang Hyo-ju		

=== Web series ===
Year	Title	Role	Notes	Ref.
2015	Sweet Temptation	Ah-mi	Extra	
2016	Happy Ending	Herself	DIA music drama	
2017	109 Strange Things	Shin Ki-won		
2017	I AM	Annie		

=== Television shows ===
Year	Title	Role	Notes	Ref.
2016	Produce 101	Contestant	Survival show that determined I.O.I members Finished 7th	
2016	M Countdown	Special MC	with Minhyuk and Kihyun	
2016	Go Go Mr.Paik!	Cast member		
2018	Law of the Jungle in Patagonia	Cast member		
2019	The Barber of Seville	Cast member		

=== Hosting ===
Year	Title	Notes	Ref.
2018	Inkigayo	with Song Kang and Kim Mingyu	
2023	Suncheon Bay International Garden Expo	with Yoon Shi-yoon	

=== Music video appearances ===
Year	Song Title	Artist	Ref.
2015	"I'm Good"	Elsie	
2016	"Ulsanbawi"	Kim Heechul & Kim Jungmo	
2016	"Flower, Wind and You"	Ki Hui-hyeon, Jeon Somi, Choi Yoo-jung and Chungha	
2017	"Super Super Lonely"	DinDin	
2018	"Serenade"	Jeon Woo-sung	

== Videography ==
=== Music videos ===
Year	Music video	Album
2016	"Our Night is More Beautiful Than Your Day" (with Yoon Bo-mi, Kim Nam-joo, LE, Seo In-young, Lee Seok-hoon, Taewoon, Yang Da-il, Brother Su, Chancellor, and Kang Min-hee)	Merry Summer

== Awards and nominations ==
Name of the award ceremony, year presented, category, nominee of the award, and the result of the nomination
Award ceremony	Year	Category	Nominee / Work	Result	Ref.
Asia Artist Awards	2017	Best Rookie Award — Television	Reunited Worlds	Won	
Fashionista Award	2017	Rising Star Award	Jung Chae-yeon	Nominated	
Grimae Awards	2018	Best New Actress	To. Jenny	Won	
KBS Drama Awards	2021	Best New Actress	The King's Affection	Nominated	
KBS Entertainment Awards	2018	Hot Issue Entertainer	To. Jenny	Won	
Korea First Brand Awards	2017	Female Acting Idol	Jung Chae-yeon	Won	
Korea First Brand Awards	2021	Female Acting Idol	Jung Chae-yeon	Won	
MBC Drama Awards	2022	Excellence Award, Actress in a Miniseries	The Golden Spoon	Nominated	
MBC Drama Awards	2022	Best Couple Award	Jung Chae-yeon (with Yook Sung-jae); The Golden Spoon	Nominated	
SBS Drama Awards	2017	Best New Actress	Reunited Worlds	Nominated	
