= Flower 4 Seasons =

- Digital cover

EP by DIA
- Released: June 10, 2020
- Recorded: 2020
- Studios: Vibe Studio; MPlus Studio
- Genre: K-pop
- Length: 19:49
- Language: Korean
- Labels: PocketDol Studio; Kakao M
- Producers: Klozer; Noo; J.O; Seo Dong-hyun; Iggy; Youngbae; Joo-eun; So; Yubin; Lee Joo-hyun; This is Seonghoon

DIA chronology
Newtro (2019)	Flower 4 Seasons (2020)

Singles from Flower 4 Seasons
- 1. "Hug U" Released: June 10, 2020

Flower 4 Seasons is the sixth extended play by South Korean girl group DIA. It was digitally released on June 10, 2020, by PocketDol Studio. The EP features six tracks, including the title track "Hug U". The EP physically released a day later, available in two versions: flower version and season version. It marked their first released under MBK's label PocketDol Studio and managed by the label since then. Members Chaeyeon and Somyi didn't take part in this album for personal reasons.

== Background and release ==
On May 26, 2020, MBK Entertainment announced through a poster that the group will be returning with their sixth mini album titled Flower 4 Seasons on June 10. This will be their first release since their fifth mini album, Newtro, was released in March 2019. A day later, a time table was released, stating that from May 29 concept photos, special films and an album highlight will be released leading to the album release. It was also revealed that pre-orders for the EP will start on June 1.

On May 30, it was reported that members Chaeyeon and Somyi will not take part in this release with no further details. It was also noted that the album will be promoted as a unit of five members with Eunice, Huihyeon, Yebin, Eunchae and Jueun.

It was digitally released on June 10, 2020, through several music portals, including MelOn and Apple Music. A day later, the album was released physically in South Korea in two versions: flower version and season version.

== Commercial performance ==
Flower 4 Seasons debuted and peaked at number 17 on the Gaon Album Chart for the week ending June 13, 2020. In its second week the album fell to number 73 but rose to number 70 in its third week. It's the lowest charting album of the group.

The album placed at number 63 on the Gaon Album Chart for the month of June 2020 with 6,280 copies sold.

== Track listing ==
Digital download
No.	Title	Lyrics	Music	Arrangement	Length
1.	"Daily"	Klozer; Noo; J.O; Seo Dong-hyun	Klozer; Noo; J.O; Seo Dong-hyun	Klozer; Noo; J.O	3:16
2.	"Hug U" (감싸줄게요)	Iggy; Yongbae	Iggy; Yongbae	Iggy; Yongbae	3:23
3.	"To You" (네게로(路))	Jueun	Jueun; So	Jueun; So; Yoo Ji-eun	3:26
4.	"Nobody Knows" (아무도 몰래)	Yebin; Lee Joo-hyun; This is Seonghoon	Yebin; Lee Joo-hyun; This is Seonghoon	This is Seonghoon	3:05
5.	"Daily" (Inst.)		Klozer; Noo; J.O; Seo Dong-hyun	Klozer; Noo; J.O	3:16
6.	"Hug U" (Inst.)		Iggy; Yongbae	Iggy; Yongbae	3:23
Total length:					19:49

== Charts ==
Chart (2020)	Peak position
South Korea (Gaon)	17

== Release history ==
Region	Date	Format	Label
Various	June 10, 2020	Digital download	MBK Entertainment
South Korea	June 11, 2020	CD	MBK Entertainment, Kakao M
Japan	June 13, 2020	CD	MBK Entertainment, PocketDol Studio
