= Summer Ade =

- From left to right: Eunice, Eunchae, Yebin, Chaeyeon, Huihyeon, Jueun, Jenny and Somyi.

EP by DIA
- Released: August 9, 2018
- Recorded: 2018
- Genre: K-pop
- Length: 23:52
- Label: MBK; Interpark

DIA chronology
Present (2017)	Summer Ade (2018)	Newtro (2019)

Singles from Summer Ade
- 1. "WooWoo" Released: August 9, 2018

Music video
- "WooWoo" on YouTube

Summer Ade is the fourth extended play by South Korean girl group DIA. It was released digitally on August 9, 2018, by MBK Entertainment under Interpark's music distribution. The EP includes a total of eight tracks including the lead single "WooWoo".

It is the only release with an eight-member group without Eunjin who departed from the group in May 2018, and last release feature of member Jenny who cite their promotions due to the health and knee injury and subsequent departure from the group.

== Release ==
DIA released on their fourth album Summer Ade on August 9, 2018, with the title track "Woo Woo". The EP was released through several music portals, including MelOn in South Korea, and iTunes for the global market.

== Promotion ==
On August 14, the group received their first music show win on SBS MTV's The Show.

== Commercial performance ==
The album debuted and peaked at number 5 on the Gaon Album Chart for the week ending August 25, 2018. In its second week the album fell to number 52 and rose to number 25 in its third week. The album charted for five consecutive weeks within the Top 100.

The album placed at number 23 for the month of August 2018 with 9,889 copies sold. It has sold 12,076 copies as of September 2018.

== Track listing ==
Digital download
No.	Title	Lyrics	Music	Arrangement	Length
1.	"Like U Like U" (조아? 조아!)	Shin-kung; Dally; Choi In-seon	Shin-kung; Wonderkid; Dally	Shin-kung; Wonderkid	3:31
2.	"WooWoo" (우우)	Shinsadong Tiger; Beomi; Nangi	Shinsadong Tiger; Beomi; Nangi	Shinsadong Tiger	3:22
3.	"Grown Up" (어른)	Peter Pan	Peter Pan; Lee Jun-hwan; Rubatov	Lee Jun-hwan; Rubatov; Kim Hoe-geon	3:51
4.	"Pick up the Phone"	JQ; Lee Yeon	Daniel Durn; Katrine `Neya` Klith; Park Su-seok; Bong Won-seok; Kim Tae-seong	Park Su-seok; Bong Won-seok	3:23
5.	"Take Me" (데리러 와)	Jueun	Jueun; Jerry.L	Jueun; Jerry.L	3:11
6.	"Sweet Dream"	Ye-bin (DIA)	Ye-bin (DIA); HotSauce	Ye-bin (DIA); HotSauce	3:12
7.	"Blue Day"	Ki Hui-hyeon; Peter Pan	Ki Hui-hyeon; Peter Pan; Lee Jun-hwan; Wooki	Lee Jun-hwan	3:32
8.	"WooWoo" (Inst.)		Shinsadong Tiger; Beomi; Nangi	Shinsadong Tiger	3:22
Total length:					23:52

== Charts ==
Chart (2018)	Peak position
South Korea (Gaon)	5

== Release history ==
Region	Date	Format	Label
Various	August 9, 2018	Digital download, streaming	MBK Entertainment, Interpark

== Awards and nominations ==
=== Music program wins ===
Program	Date	Ref
The Show (SBS MTV)	August 14, 2018	
