= Eun-chae =

- Hangul: 은채
- RR: Eunchae
- MR: Ŭnch'ae
- IPA: [ɯntɕʰɛ]

Eun-chae, also spelled Eun-chay, or Eun-cheh, Un-chae, is a Korean given name.

== People ==
People with this name include:

- Jung Eun-chae (born 1986), South Korean actress
- Song Eun-chae (born 1986), South Korean actress
- Kwon Chae-won (born 1999), previously known as Eunchae, member of DIA
- Hong Eunchae (born 2006), South Korean singer, member of Le Sserafim

== Fictional characters ==
Fictional characters with this name include:

- Song Eun-chae, in 2004 South Korean television series I'm Sorry, I Love You
- Byeon Eun-chae, in 2008 South Korean television series Iljimae

== See also ==
- List of Korean given names
