= Yebin (singer) =

South Korean singer (born 1997)

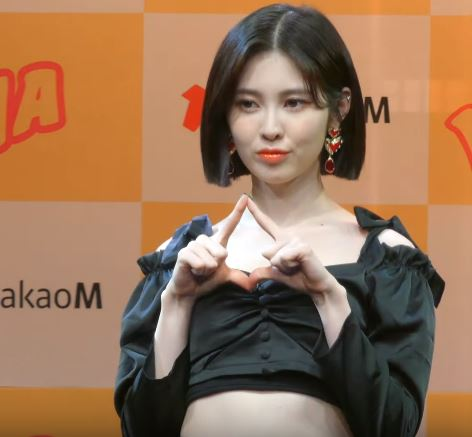
- Yebin in 2019
- Born: Baek Ye-bin; July 13, 1997 (age 29); Chuncheon, Gangwon Province, South Korea
- Occupation: Singer-songwriter
- Musical career
- Genre: K-pop
- Instrument: Vocals
- Years active: 2015–present
- Label: YamYam Entertainment
- Formerly of: Uni.T; DIA

Korean name
- Hangul: 백예빈
- Hanja: 白豫彬
- RR: Baek Yebin
- MR: Paek Yebin

Baek Ye-bin (Korean: 백예빈; born July 13, 1997), better known mononymously as Yebin, is a South Korean singer-songwriter and composer. She is best known for being a member of the South Korean girl group DIA, and for finishing second in the survival show The Unit, making her a member of Uni.T.

== Early life and education ==
Baek Ye-bin was born on July 13, 1997, in Chuncheon, Gangwon Province, South Korea. She grew up with her parents and her younger brother, Baek Jin-woo. Her father is a mathematics teacher, and her mother owns a salon in Chuncheon. The salon is named 'DIAHAIR'. Yebin previously studied at Chuncheon Girls High School, along with Binnie of Oh My Girl, but later moved to Seocho High School.

== Career ==
=== Pre-debut ===
Yebin was a trainee of Ensoul Entertainment, where she was slated to debut with girl group Project A, along with fellow members Jenny and Eunchae. Yebin enrolled in Calip Dance Academy, along with fellow member Huihyeon. Yebin was once a school uniform model along with B1A4 members.

=== 2015: Debut with DIA ===
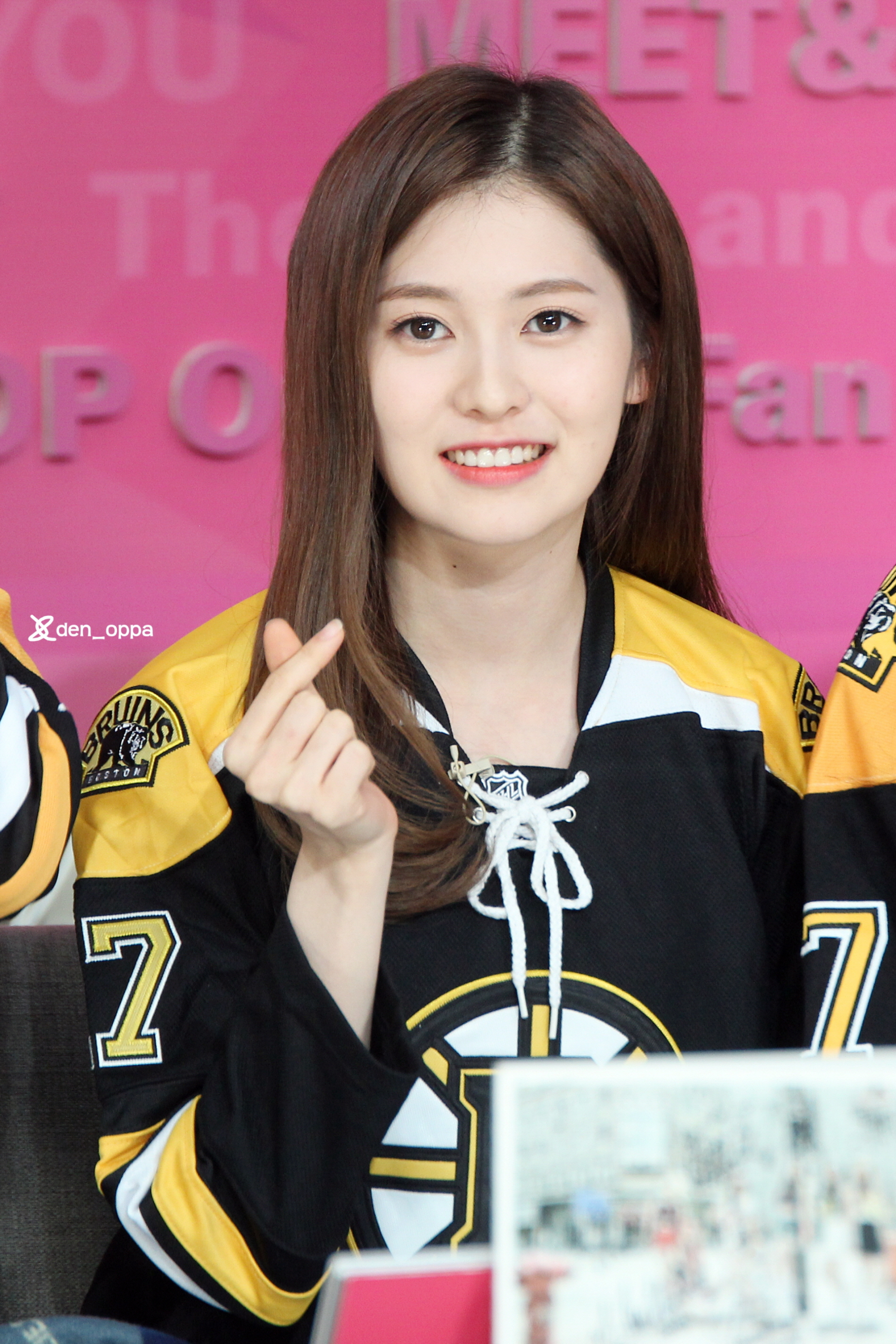
Yebin in 2015

In January 2015, MBK Entertainment announced its plans to debut a new girl group, originally with a strategy to have possible candidates compete on a reality survival program. Once the idea was scrapped, however, the company decided to select its members internally and the final line-up was revealed with seven members: Seung-hee, Cathy, Eunice, Jenny, Eun-jin, Chae-yeon and Ye-bin herself.

DIA released their debut album, Do It Amazing on September 14, 2015, with the lead single "Somehow" (왠지; Waenji). Their first official public appearance was on the same day where the group performed a showcase at the Ilchi Art Hall in Seoul. They made their official debut stage on Mnet's M! Countdown on September 17, 2015.

=== 2016: Lyric writing ===
Throughout her career, besides contributing her vocal to DIA's songs, Yebin has explored into lyrics writing. She penned the lyrics for the song "Waiting For You" (2016), while co-writing the songs: "Will You Go Out With Me?", "Boyfriend", "April", "Mannequin", "You Are My Flower", "Light", "Listen To This Song", "Not Only You But Spring" and "Independence Movement Day".

=== 2017: Seoraksan in October and The Unit ===
On September 4, 2017, Yebin and fellow member Somyi wrote a letter to their fans and posted it via Instagram, letting fans know of their decision to participate in KBS' idol rebooting project The Unit.

Before participating on KBS2's 'The Unit', Yebin and fellow member Somyi promised to release a duet single. They kept their promise by releasing a teaser image for the single on September 23, 2017. The duet is called "Seoraksan in October", a song illustrating the beauty of Seoraksan in the fall when the trees turn colors, and expressing one's wishes to take off on an adventure come the fall season.

On September 28, 2017, Yebin and fellow member Somyi released their last duet together before they join KBS's 'The Unit'. They performed their duet "Seoraksan in October" featuring Eunchae on the September 29, 2017, broadcast of Music Bank.

On October 3, 2017, MBK Entertainment has confirmed that DIA will be making a comeback but will promote as 7 members for their "Good Night" comeback without Yebin and Somyi as both will be busy with the upcoming idol rebooting show 'The Unit' even though they recorded songs for 'Gift'.

=== 2018: UNI.T ===
On February 10, 2018, during the final episode of The Unit, Yebin placed 2nd among female contestants with an overall of 83,910 votes and became a member of the final female line-up which was later revealed to be named UNI.T. Yebin promoted with UNI.T for seven months.

UNI.T officially debuted with their first extended play, Line, on May 18, 2018, with the lead single "No More", composed by Shinsadong Tiger. The lead single is characterized by its reggae elements. The group performed "No More" for the first time at the 2018 Dream Concert on May 12, six days before their debut. They officially made their debut stage on KBS' Music Bank on the same day as the album's release, where they performed "A Memory Clock" and "No More".

=== 2021–present: Solo debut ===
On June 23, 2021, it was announced that Yebin will make her solo debut with the single "Yes I Know" on July 7.

On June 14, 2023, Yebin released her first single under YamYam Entertainment, titled "Contrail".

== Discography ==
=== Singles ===
Title	Year	Peak chart position	Album
Title	Year	KOR	Album
"Waiting for You" (널 기다려)	2016	—	Happy Ending
"Seoraksan in October" (시월에 설악산) (with Somyi)	2017	—	Present
"Yes I Know"	2021	—	Non-album singles
"White Christmas" (크리스마스에는) (with Lee Bo-ram and Punch)	2022	194	Non-album singles
"Contrail" (비행구름)	2023	—	Non-album singles
"—" denotes releases that did not chart or were not released in that region.

== Videography ==
=== Music videos ===
Title	Year	Director(s)	Ref.
"Yes I Know"	2021	Unknown	
"Contrail"	2023	Unknown	

== Filmography ==
=== Web series ===
Year	Title	Role	Notes
2016	Happy Ending	Yebin	Lead role
2023	Happy Merry Ending	Hyunji	Supporting role

=== Television series ===
Year	Title	Role	Notes
2020	Zombie Detective	Yebin	Supporting role

=== Variety shows ===
Year	Title	Role
2017	The Unit: Idol Rebooting Project	Contestant
2017	The King of Masked Singer ep. 125	Contestant
