= V-1 (TV series) =

- Genre: Music; Reality
- Presented by: Kang Ho-dong
- Starring: See below
- Country of origin: South Korea
- Original language: Korean
- No. of seasons: 1
- No. of episodes: 3

Production
- Production location: South Korea
- Production company: tvN

Original release
- Network: tvN
- Release: 13 September – 15 September 2019

V-1 was a South Korean music television program that aired as a pilot program for Chuseok on tvN, on September 13–15, 2019 at 17:40 (KST). It was hosted by Kang Ho-dong.

== Program ==
The program name "V-1" is a combination of "V" in Vocal and "1" in No.1. The purpose of this program is to select the Vocal Queen among the girl group members. Registration for the program was open to all girl group members, regardless of their positions in their groups. The production team then selected 24 girl group members and revealed their audition clips. The public may vote for their top 5 favourite girl group members on V-1's official website. Only the top 12 girl group members in votes would progress and perform on the show.

In the 1st and 2nd episodes, there would be 6 match-ups in Round 1. The winner of each match-up would move on to Round 2, through the voting of the 101 members of the VIP voting squad, which includes JeA (Brown Eyed Girls), Hyun Woo, Car, the Garden and fashion creative director Yang Ji-hye.

In the 3rd episode, Round 2 and the final round would be held. In Round 2, the 6 winning contestants from Round 1 would be split into 2 groups of 3 through random drawing of lots. The winner from each group would advance to the final round. The final winner of this series wins ₩10,000,000.

== Contestants ==
=== Final contestants ===
| Pre-voting Final Ranking | No. of votes | Name | Group | Song Used For Audition | Ref. |
|---|---|---|---|---|---|
| 1 | 37,066 | Yeonjung | WJSN | U Sung-eun - Take Me Home (집으로 데려가줘) | |
| 2 | 31,389 | Siyeon | Dreamcatcher | Maktub, Jeong Young-eun- Inside Me (품) | |
| 3 | 30,854 | Choi Yoo-jung | Weki Meki | Blackpink - Whistle (휘파람) | |
| 4 | 24,828 | Ji Su-yeon | Weki Meki | Big Mama - Betrayal (배반) | |
| 5 | 24,615 | Haeyoon | Cherry Bullet | Hwayobi - Such A Thing (그런일은) | |
| 6 | 21,766 | Nayoung | Gugudan | Wine Loop - What Are You Talking About | |
| 7 | 21,668 | Lee Jin-sol | April | BTS - Euphoria | |
| 8 | 19,980 | High.D | Sonamoo | Hynn - The Lonely Bloom Stands Alone (시든 꽃에 물을 주듯) | |
| 9 | 19,683 | Jung Da-kyung | Venus | Ailee - Singing Got Better (노래가 늘었어) | |
| 10 | 19,427 | Jueun | DIA | Taeyeon (Girls' Generation) - U R | |
| 11 | 19,365 | Bora | Cherry Bullet | Ben - Love, ing (열애중) | |
| 12 | 18,432 | Seoryoung | GWSN | Ailee - I Will Go to You Like the First Snow (첫눈처럼 너에게 가겠다) | |

Non-selected contestants
| Name | Group | Song Used For Audition | Ref. |
|---|---|---|---|
| Minjae | Sonamoo | Kim Bo-kyung - Don't Think That You're Alone (혼자라고 생각말기) | |
| Yoon Chae-kyung | April | Bubble Sisters - I Do Love Like That, I Do Smile Like That (그렇게 사랑하고 그렇게 웃었습니다) | |
| Kim Chae-won | April | Kassy - The Day Was Beautiful (그때가 좋았어) | |
| Huihyeon | DIA | Eco - Blessed Me (행복한 나를) | |
| Eunchae | DIA | Younha - Comet (혜성) | |
| Yoohyeon | Dreamcatcher | BTS - Boy with Luv (작은 것들을 위한 시) | |
| Dajeong | HashTag | Heize - Don't Know You (널 너무 모르고) | |
| Seungmin | HashTag | Ailee - Ice Flower (얼음꽃) | |
| Lena | GWSN | Chen (Exo) - Beautiful Goodbye (사월이 지나면 우리 헤어져요) | |
| SeeA | Pink Fantasy | Mamamoo - Décalcomanie (데칼코마니) | |
| Taera | GeeGu | Lee Sun-hee - Fate (인연) | |
| Carlyn | Z-Girls | Taeyeon (Girls' Generation) - U R | |

== Episodes ==
Episode 1 (September 13, 2019)

Round 1
| Battle # | Name | Girl Group | Song | No. Of Votes | Winner | Ref. |
|---|---|---|---|---|---|---|
| 1 | Lee Jin-sol | April | Boy with Luv (작은 것들을 위한 시) (BTS) | 39 | Jung Da-kyung | |
| 1 | Jung Da-kyung | VENUS | Love Over A Thousand Years (천년의 사랑) (Park Wan-kyu) | 62 | Jung Da-kyung | |
| 2 | Ji Su-yeon | Weki Meki | First Impression (첫인상) (Kim Gun-mo) | 53 | Ji Su-yeon | |
| 2 | Choi Yoo-jung | Weki Meki | And July (Heize ft. Dean, DJ Friz) | 48 | Ji Su-yeon | |
| 3 | Bora | Cherry Bullet | Don't Go Today (오늘은 가지마) (Ben) | 44 | High.D | |
| 3 | High.D | Sonamoo | A Cup of Soju (소주 한 잔) (Im Chang-jung) | 55 | High.D | |

Episode 2 (September 14, 2019)

Round 1
| Battle # | Name | Girl Group | Song | No. Of Votes | Winner | Ref. |
|---|---|---|---|---|---|---|
| 4 | Nayoung | Gugudan | Me, In (Wonder Girls) | 47 | Haeyoon | |
| 4 | Haeyoon | Cherry Bullet | Tears Stole The Heart (눈물이 맘을 훔쳐서) (Ailee) | 50 | Haeyoon | |
| 5 | Siyeon | Dreamcatcher | Last Love (끝사랑) (Kim Bum-soo) | 51 | Siyeon | |
| 5 | Jueun | DIA | One's Way Back (귀로) (Park Seon-ju) | 48 | Siyeon | |
| 6 | Seoryoung | GWSN | Don't Forget (잊지 말아요) (Baek Ji-young) | 33 | Yeonjung | |
| 6 | Yeonjung | WJSN | Wind Flower (바람꽃) (Lee Sun-hee) | 65 | Yeonjung | |

Episode 3 (September 15, 2019)

Round 2
| Group # | Name | Girl Group | Song | No. Of Votes | Winner | Ref. |
|---|---|---|---|---|---|---|
| 1 | Haeyoon | Cherry Bullet | Place Where You Need To Be (니가 있어야 할 곳) (g.o.d) | 28 | Siyeon | |
| 1 | Ji Su-yeon | Weki Meki | Y Si Fuera Ella (혜야) (Jonghyun) | 33 | Siyeon | |
| 1 | Siyeon | Dreamcatcher | Overdose (중독) (EXO) | 38 | Siyeon | |
| 2 | Yeonjung | WJSN | Fine (Taeyeon) | 36 | Yeonjung | |
| 2 | Jung Da-kyung | VENUS | Dear Love (사랑아) (The One) | 27 | Yeonjung | |
| 2 | High.D | Sonamoo | Fate (인연) (Lee Sun-hee) | 33 | Yeonjung | |

Final Round
| Name | Girl Group | Song | No. Of Votes | Winner | Ref. |
|---|---|---|---|---|---|
| Siyeon | Dreamcatcher | The Moon of Seoul (서울의 달) (Kim Gun-mo) | 41 | Yeonjung | |
| Yeonjung | WJSN | In Dream (꿈에) (Lena Park) | 58 | Yeonjung | |

== Ratings ==
- In the ratings below, the highest rating for the show will be in red and the lowest rating for the show will be in blue each year.

| Ep. # | Original Airdate | AGB Nielsen |
|---|---|---|
| 1 | September 13, 2019 | 1.0% |
| 2 | September 14, 2019 | 0.8% |
| 3 | September 15, 2019 | 0.9% |
