= Love Generation =

Love Generation may refer to:

- "Love Generation" (song), a song by Bob Sinclar
- Love Generation (EP), a 2017 EP by DIA
- Love Generation (TV series), a Japanese television series
- Former name of Swedish pop group Stockholm Syndrome
- The Love Generation, an American Pop-Rock group from the 1960s

== See also ==
- Sexual revolution
- "Generation Love", a 2011 song by Jennette McCurdy
