= Newtro =

EP by DIA
- Released: March 19, 2019
- Recorded: 2019
- Genre: K-pop; retro
- Length: 17:32
- Label: MBK; Kakao M

DIA chronology
Summer Ade (2018)	Newtro (2019)	Flower 4 Seasons (2020)

Singles from Newtro
- 1. "Woowa" Released: March 19, 2019

Music video
- "Woowa" on YouTube

Newtro is the fifth extended play by South Korean girl group DIA. It was released digitally on March 19, 2019 and physically on March 29, 2019 by MBK Entertainment under Kakao M's music distribution. The EP includes a total of five tracks including the lead single "Woowa". Jenny did not participate in the album's recordings and promotions due to health concerns before her departure from the group on July 6, 2019.

== Release ==
The EP was released through several music portals, including MelOn in South Korea, and iTunes for the global market.

== Commercial performance ==
The album debuted and peaked at number 8 on the Gaon Album Chart for the week ending March 30, 2019. Newtro spent seven consecutive weeks within the Top 40 and a total of eight weeks within the Top 100 on the chart.

The album placed at number 52 on the Gaon Album Chart for the month of March 2019 with 4,272 copies sold. It also charted at number 42 for the month of April with 5,110 additional copies sold. It has sold 10,576 copies as of May 2019.

== Track listing ==
Digital download
No.	Title	Lyrics	Music	Arrangement	Length
1.	"Woowa" (우와)	Shinsadong Tiger; Beomi; Nangi	Shinsadong Tiger; Beomi; Nangi	Shinsadong Tiger	3:30
2.	"No" (안할래)	Shinsadong Tiger; room102; V!VE; Shin Min-jung	Shinsadong Tiger; room102; V!VE; Shin Min-jung	Shinsadong Tiger	3:22
3.	"5 More Minutes" (5분만)	Peter Pan; Ki Hui-hyeon	Peter Pan; Ki Hui-hyeon; Lee Jun-hwan; Rubatov	Lee Jun-hwan; Rubatov; Kim Hoe-geon	3:29
4.	"Crescendo" (손톱달)	Joo-eun; Ye-bin (DIA)	Joo-eun; Ye-bin (DIA); Flame	Flame	3:42
5.	"Woowa" (Inst.)		Shinsadong Tiger; Beomi; Nangi	Shinsadong Tiger	3:30
Total length:					17:32

== Charts ==
Chart (2019)	Peak position
South Korea (Gaon)	8

== Release history ==
Region	Date	Format	Label
Various	March 19, 2019	Digital download, streaming	MBK Entertainment, Interpark
