= Kwon Chae-won =

South Korean singer

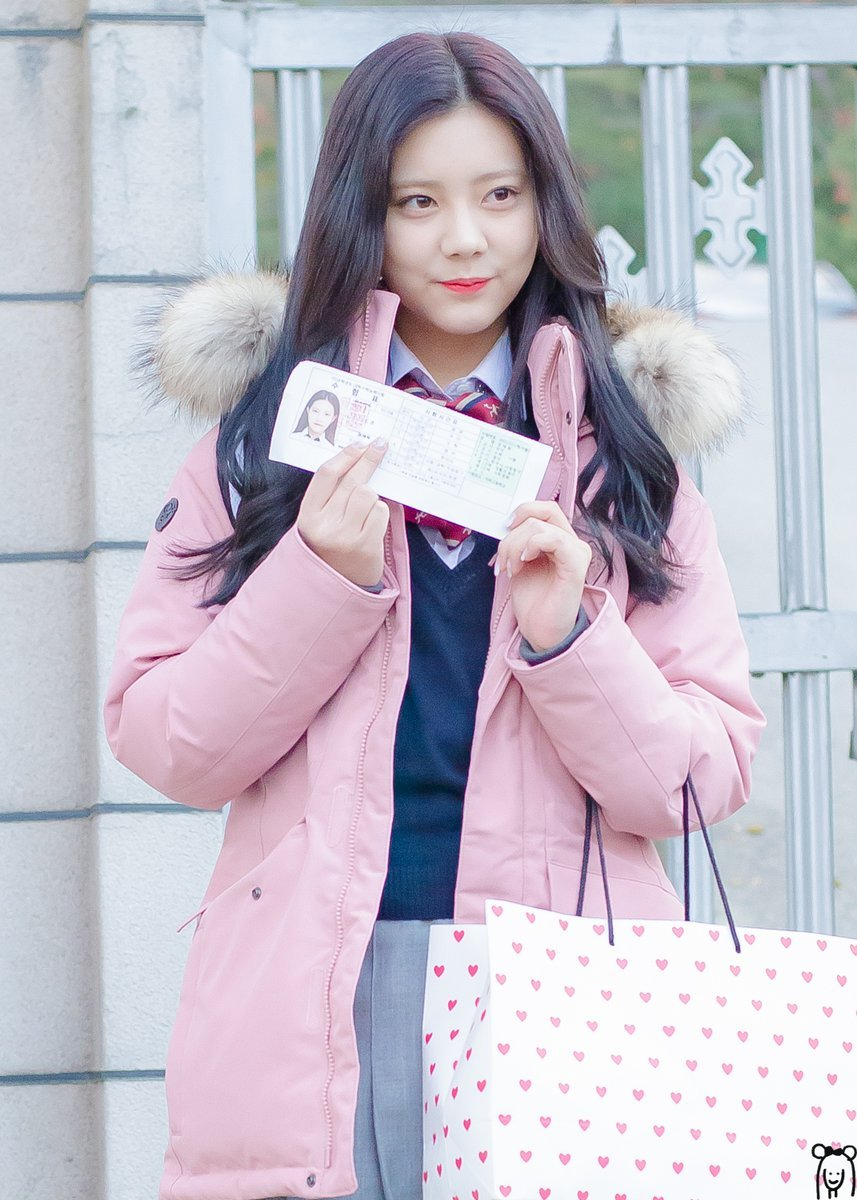
- Kwon in November 2017
- Born: Kwon Chae-won; May 26, 1999 (age 27); Seoul, South Korea
- Education: Hanlim Multi Art School
- Occupations: Singer; actress
- Years active: 2016–present
- Agent: Started Entertainment (2024–present)
- Musical career
- Genre: K-pop
- Instrument: Vocals
- Member of: DIA

Korean name
- Hangul: 권채원
- RR: Gwon Chaewon
- MR: Kwŏn Ch'aewŏn

Kwon Chae-won (born May 26, 1999), previously known as Eunchae, is a South Korean singer and actress. She is a member of girl group DIA.

Apart from her group's activities, Kwon has also starred in Tooniverse's first web drama The Shining Nara, which has gained popularity with over 10 million views in the first month on YouTube.

== Early life and education ==
Kwon was born on May 26, 1999 in Seoul, South Korea. She attended Hanlim Multi Art School. On February 9, 2018, she graduated with a major in Arts.

== Career ==
=== Pre-debut ===
Kwon was a trainee of Ensoul Entertainment, where she was slated to debut with girl group Project A along with fellow members Yebin and Jenny.

=== 2016–present: Debut with DIA and solo activities ===
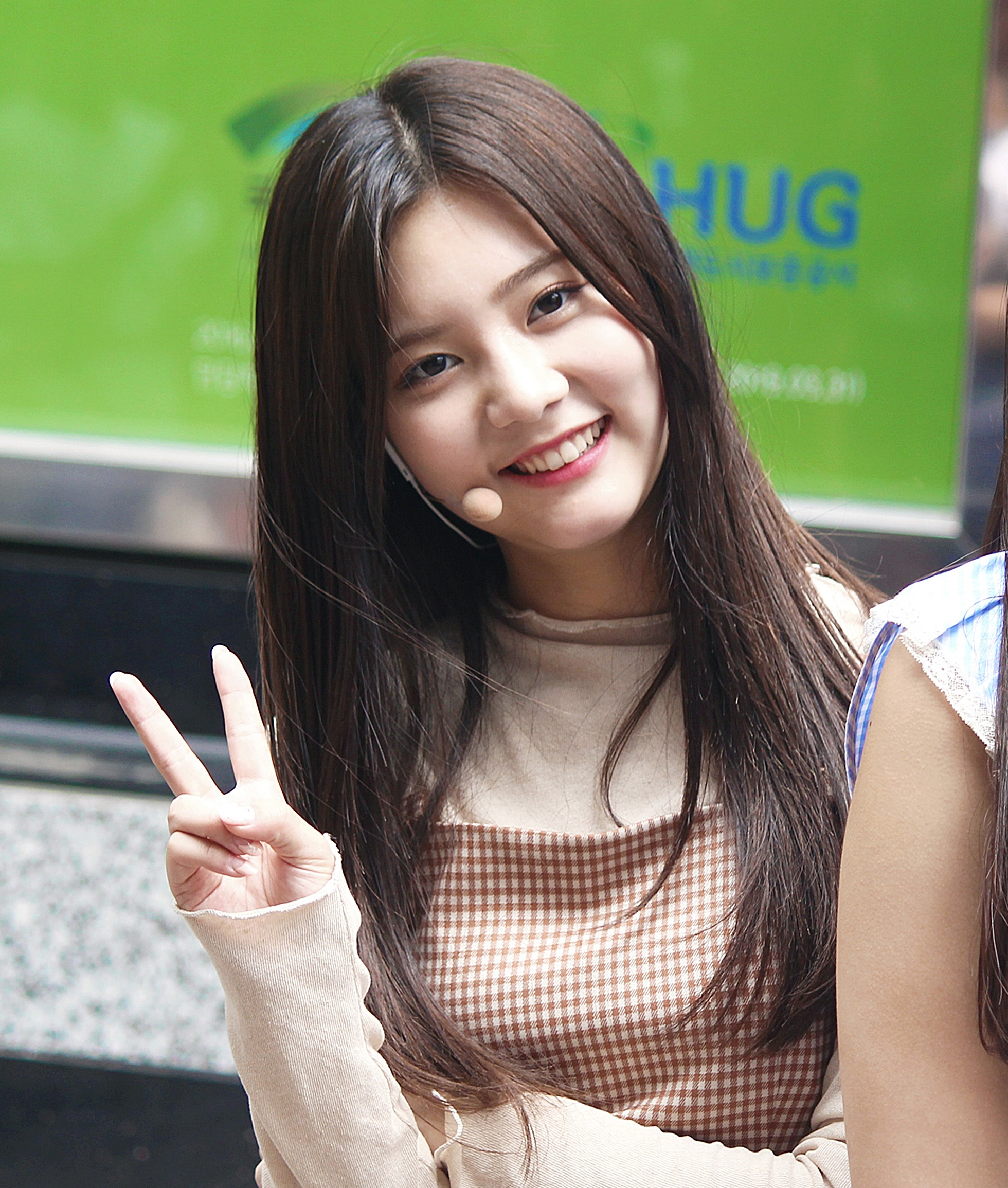
Kwon in 2016

On March 6, 2016, MBK Entertainment announced Kwon as a new member of DIA to resume the group's activities as six-piece due their two other member on hiatus. Kwon made her debut following the release of DIA's first EP Happy Ending on June 14, 2016. She also wrote her solo song "Remember", which was included as a track of the EP.

In 2017, Kwon debuted as an actress with a main role in the web drama The Shining Nara. In 2018, she also starred in the web drama Do Dream. and has appeared in the web series To. Jenny

In 2022, Kwon was cast in the web drama Cherry Blossoms After Winter. In September 2022, Kwon along with her bandmates decided not to renew their contract with PocketDol Studio and later announced that the group has not officially disbanded but is on indefinite hiatus.

In 2023, Kwon participated as a contestant in the SBS survival show Universe Ticket under her real name. She was eventually eliminated in episode 5.

In February 2024, Kwon announced that she would held her first fan meeting, 2024 Kwon Chae-won Fanmeeting: Blooming Day on March 9. The fanmeet also featured Unis member Hyeonju and Universe Ticket contestant Yona.

In January 2025, Kwon confirmed her musical starring debut in The Man Who Writes a Diary, which released in February.

== Discography ==
=== Singles ===
Title	Year	Peak chart position	Album
Title	Year	KOR	Album
"Remember" (기억할게요)	2016	—	Happy Ending
"—" denotes releases that did not chart or were not released in that region.

== Filmography ==
=== Television series ===
Year	Title	Role	Notes	Ref.
2018	To. Jenny	Member of Cocoa	Cameo	
2020	Homemade Love Story	Herself	Cameo (Ep. 1)	

=== Web series ===
Year	Title	Role	Notes	Ref.
2016	Happy Ending	Herself		
2017	The Shining Nara	Bit Na		
2018	Do Dream	Jung Shi-yeon		
2022	Cherry Blossoms After Winter	Kim Se-ri		

=== Variety shows ===
Year	Title	Role	Notes	Ref.
2019	V-1	Contestant		
2023	Universe Ticket	Contestant	Survival show	
