= Lee Ju-eun =

South Korean singer and actress (born 1995)

- 이주은
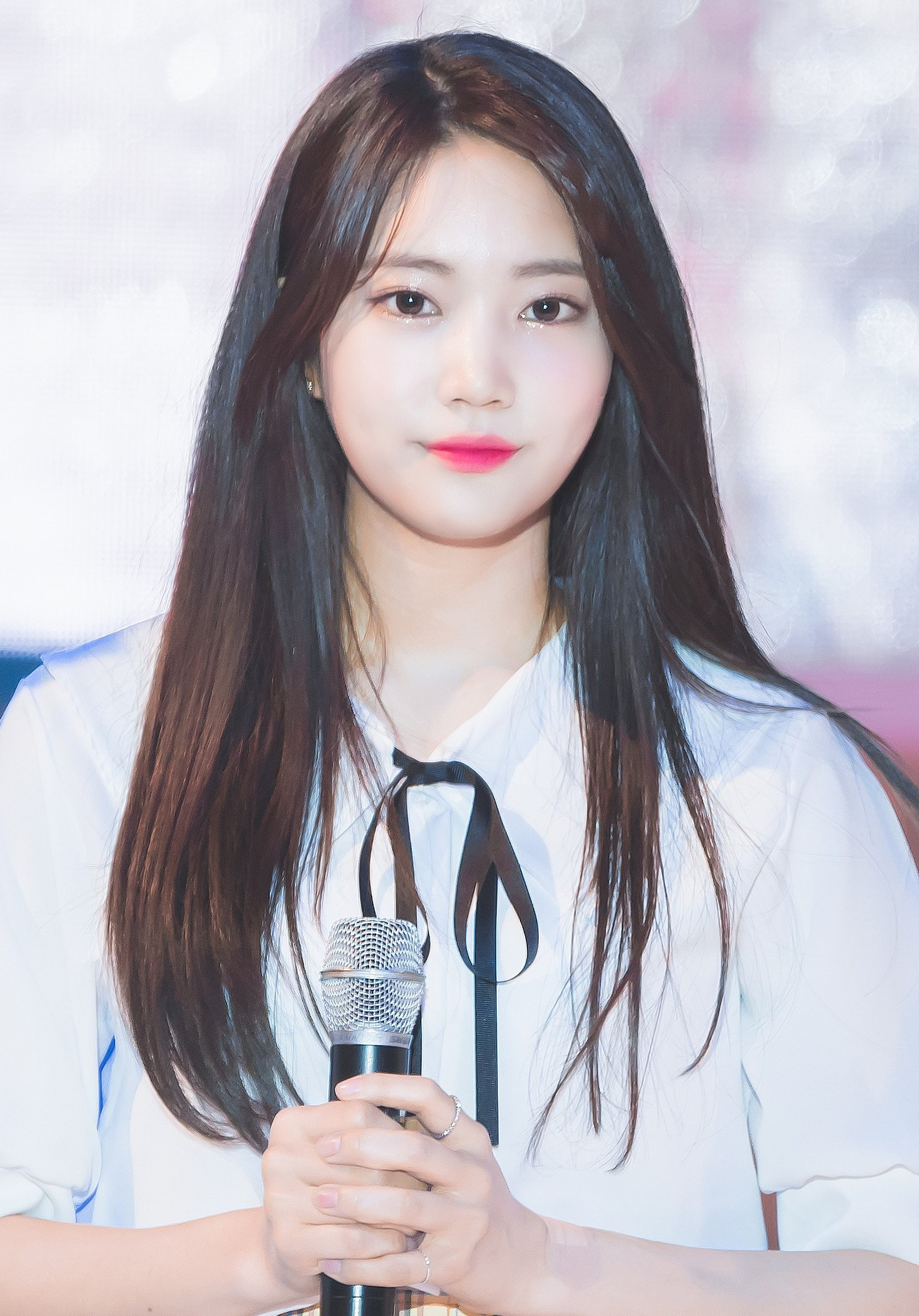
- Lee in July 2018
- Born: June 7, 1995 (age 31); Suwon, South Korea
- Education: Korea Nazarene University
- Occupations: Singer; actress
- Musical career
- Genre: K-pop
- Instrument: Vocals
- Years active: 2017–present
- Labels: MBK; PocketDol Studio; AER Music; Episode Music
- Member of: DIA

Korean name
- Hangul: 이주은
- Hanja: 李宙恩
- RR: I Jueun
- MR: I Chuŭn

Lee Ju-eun (Korean: 이주은; born June 7, 1995), known mononymously as Jueun, is a South Korean singer and actress known for her work as a member of South Korean girl group DIA. She made her solo debut with the debut single "Easy Breezy" featuring Seo In-guk on April 27, 2023.

== Early life and education ==
Lee Ju-eun was born on June 7, 1995, in Suwon, South Korea. She attended Korea Nazarene University where she majored in Practical Music.

== Career ==
=== Pre-debut: K-pop Star 2 ===
In 2012, Lee appeared in second season of SBS's reality competition show K-pop Star as a contestant. She was eliminated at Battle Audition, the fourth round of the show where the remaining contestants competing for a spot at the Top 10, on the eleventh episode. In 2014, she participated once again in the third season of the show but got eliminated earlier on the tenth episode at the Casting Audition, a round before Battle Audition.

She is a former Polaris Entertainment trainee for three years before joining MBK Entertainment.

=== 2017–2019: Debut with DIA and solo activities ===
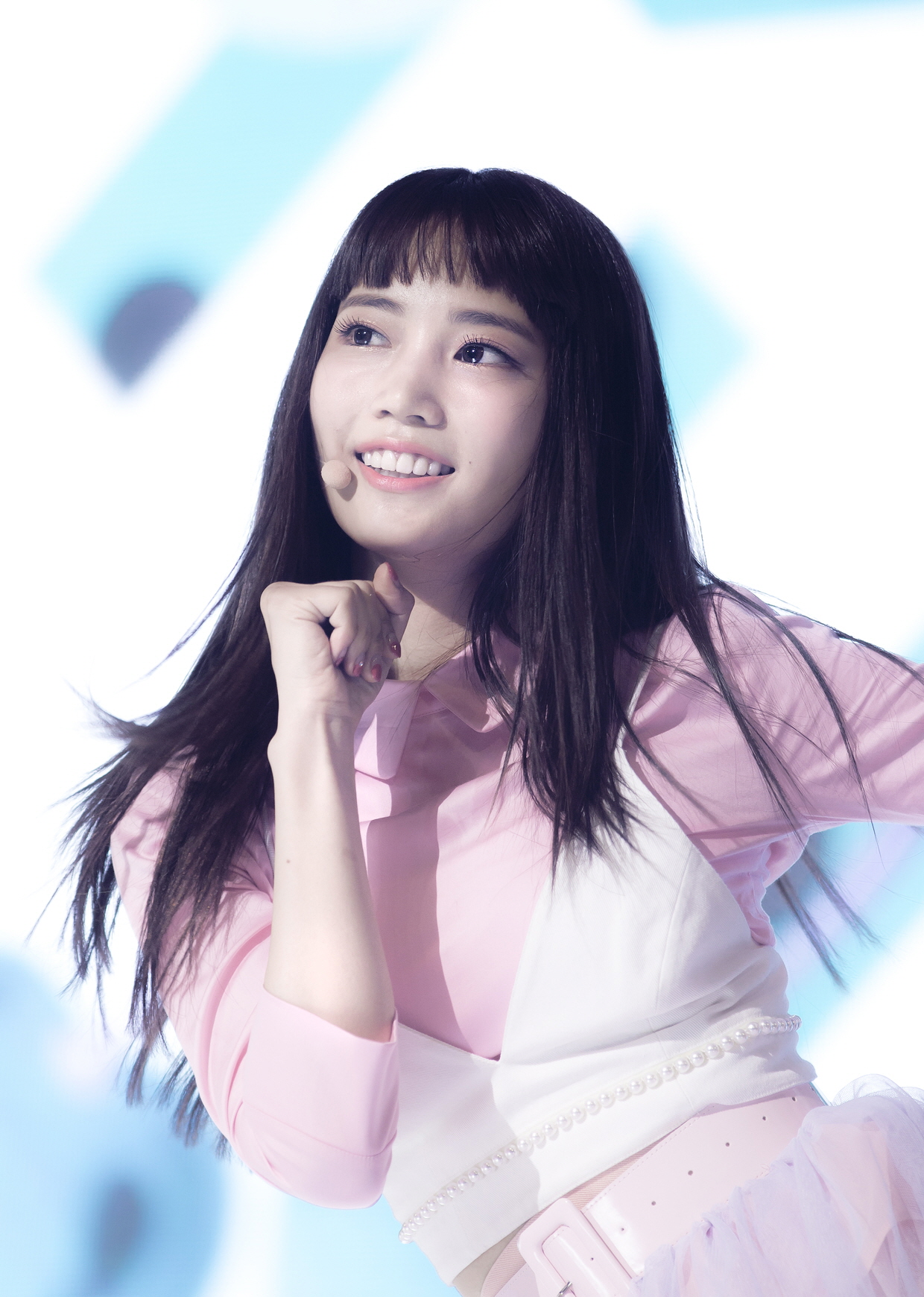
Lee performing in 2017

In April 2017, MBK Entertainment announced its plans to add two new members, Lee and Somyi, to join DIA. Both are described by MBK as members with excellent vocal skills. Lee made her official debut as a member of DIA with the release of the group's sophomore studio album, YOLO.

In 2018, Lee participated on UNB's Black Heart promotion cycle as a back-dancer for the single of the same name alongside Lee Han-gyul, former Beatwin member Jungha, and S.I.S's Anne. Lee made her acting debut in the Bridge TV's web series Do Dream, aired on mid-October, as Go Yu-na, an honor student with a charming voice. She also sang the soundtrack called "Lost Star" for the series. She later appeared on KBS2 Drama Special - The Expiration Date of You and Me as Park Se-hee, a cold girl who kept rejecting the male lead's confessions in the past.

On February 1, 2019, MBK Entertainment confirmed that Lee would take a lead role at a web series produced by urban-bnt called I Started Following Romance. She played as Yoo In-byeol, a college student in her senior year with some love interests, including the male lead. In September 2019, Lee participated in the survival program show, V-1, to select the Vocal Queen among the various girl group members, where only the top 12 girl group members in votes would progress and perform on the show. She placed tenth in the preliminary votes, thus qualifying her to perform of the show. She lost to Dreamcatcher's Siyeon at the first round with a score of 51:48.

=== 2023–present: Solo debut ===
Following her departure from Pocketdol Studio (a subsidiary of MBK Entertainment) on September 15, 2022, Lee signed an exclusive contract with Aer Music on December 19.

On March 3, 2023, Lee sang the soundtrack "The First Moment" for MBC TV's Kokdu: Season of Deity. On April 27, Lee made her solo debut with her first single "Easy Breezy", featuring Seo In-guk. On October 4, Lee released a new single "Paradise".

On June 28, 2024, Lee released her first digital single "Stay".

== Discography ==
=== Single albums ===
List of single albums, showing selected details, selected chart positions, and sales figures
Title	Details	Peak chart positions	Sales
Title	Details	KOR	Sales
Easy Breezy	Released: April 27, 2023; Label: Aer Music; Formats: CD, digital download, streaming; Track listing: 1. "Easy Breezy" (featuring Seo In-guk); 2. "Easy Breezy" (Inst.)	66	KOR: 1,333
Stay	Released: June 28, 2024; Label: Episode Music; Formats: Digital download, streaming; Track listing: 1. "Stay" (Original Ver.); 2. "Stay" (Synth Pop Ver.)	—	—N/a
"—" denotes releases that did not chart or were not released in that region.

=== Singles ===
List of singles, showing year released, and name of the album
Title	Year	Album
As lead artist
"Easy Breezy" (featuring Seo In-guk)	2023	Easy Breezy
"Paradise"	2023	Non-album single
"Stay" (Original Ver.)	2024	Stay
"1,2,3,4" (featuring Moon Su-jin)	2024	Non-album singles
"Santa, I have a Wish..."	2024	Non-album singles
As featured artist
"I Don't Know You Don't Know" (알듯 말듯) (Snowman featuring Jueun)	2017	Non-album single
Soundtrack appearances
"Lost Star"	2018	Do Dream OST
"The First Moment" (처음 순간)	2023	Kokdu: Season of Deity OST

== Videography ==
=== Music videos ===
Title	Year	Director	Length	Ref.
"Easy Breezy" (featuring Seo In-guk)	2023	Sehoon Jeon	3:08	
"Stay"	2024	Sui Film (A Years Production)	3:01	
"1,2,3,4" (featuring Moon Su-jin)	2024	ND Kim (Indeed)	3:49	

== Filmography ==
=== Television series ===
Year	Title	Role	Notes	Ref.
2018	KBS Drama Special: "The Expiration Date of You and Me"	Park Se-hee		
2018	To. Jenny	Trainee	Cameo (Ep. 1)	

=== Web series ===
Year	Title	Role	Ref.
2018	Do Dream	Go Yu-na	
2019	I Started Following Romance	Yoo In-byeol	
2019	My First First Love	Han Song-i's friend	

=== Television shows ===
Year	Title	Role	Notes	Ref.
2012	K-pop Star 2	Contestant	Eliminated at the Battle Audition round	
2014	K-pop Star 3	Contestant	Eliminated at the Casting Audition round	
2019	V-1	Contestant	Eliminated at the first round	
