= Love Generation (EP) =

- Digital edition

EP by DIA
- Released: August 22, 2017
- Recorded: 2017
- Genre: K-pop; bubblegum pop; R&B
- Length: 42:08
- Label: MBK; Interpark

DIA chronology
YOLO (2017)	Love Generation (2017)	Summer Ade (2018)

Singles from Love Generation
- 1. "Can't Stop" Released: August 22, 2017

Music video
- "Can't Stop" on YouTube

Present reissue cover

Singles from Present
- 1. "Good Night" Released: October 12, 2017

Music video
- "Good Night" on YouTube

Love Generation is the third extended play by South Korean girl group DIA. It was digitally released on August 22, 2017, by MBK Entertainment and distributed by Interpark. A day later, the EP was released physically in South Korea. The album consists of twelve tracks, including "Can't Stop" as the lead single.

A repackaged version titled Present was digitally released on October 12, 2017, and includes four new songs with "Good Night" released as the album's single It was physically released on October 20.

This marks the last release with member Eunjin before her departure from the group in May 2018.

== Release ==
=== Love Generation ===
The EP was digitally released on August 22, 2017, through several music portals, including MelOn in South Korea, and iTunes for the global market. In South Korea, it was physically released a day later in four versions: normal edition, limited edition, BCHCS unit version and LUB unit version.

=== Present ===
The reissue was digitally released on October 12, 2017, through several music portals. In South Korea, it was physically released on October 20 in three versions: Good Morning edition, Good Evening edition and Good Night edition.

== Singles ==
"LO OK" was released as a promotional single on August 17, 2017. It was released by DIA's unit BCHCS, composed of members Yebin, Chaeyeon, Huihyeon, Eunice and Somyi. A music video was also released on August 17.

"Darling My Sugar" was released as a promotional single on August 18, 2017. It was released by DIA's unit L.U.B., composed of members Jueun, Jenny, Eunjin and Eunchae. A music video was also released on August 18.

"Can't Stop" was released as the title track in conjunction with the EP on August 22, 2017. A music video was released on the same day.

"Good Night" was released as the title track of the repackaged version on October 12, 2017.

== Commercial performance ==
=== Love Generation ===
All four versions of the album debuted and peaked on the Gaon Album Chart for the week ending August 26, 2017. The normal edition at number 7, the BCHCS unit edition at number 11, the limited edition at number 12 and the LUB unit edition at number 13. In a second week, the normal edition placed at number 30. In a third week, the normal edition continued to chart with the units versions reappearing and all three versions stayed for two more weeks.

All four versions debuted on the Gaon Album Chart for the month of August 2017. The normal edition at number 20, the BCHCS unit version at number 34, the limited edition at number 34 and the LUB unit version at number 39, selling 22,492 copies combined. For the month of September three editions charted on the chart selling 4,990 additional copies.

Love Generation sold 27,482 combined copies as of September 2017, becoming the group's best-selling album to date.

=== Present ===
The repackage debuted and peaked at number 12 on the Gaon Album Chart for the week ending October 21, 2017. In its second week, the album fell to number 14.

It debuted at number 20 on the Gaon Album Chart for the month of October with 9,562 copies sold.

The album sold 37,044 combined copies as of October 2017, becoming the group's best-selling album to date.

== Track listing ==
Love Generation – Digital download
No.	Title	Lyrics	Music	Arrangement	Length
1.	"Can't Stop" (듣고싶어 (E905))	Jinli; Long Candy; Glory Face; Yokan	Glory Face; Yokan; Jinli	Glory Face; Yokan	3:40
2.	"You're Different" (넌 달라)	Duble Sidekick; Long Candy	Duble Sidekick; Long Candy	Eastwest	3:26
3.	"You & I" (여.사.친 (우리사이))	Child Playing; Melody Work	Child Playing; Melody Work	Child Playing; Melody Work	3:30
4.	"LO OK" (BinChaenHyunSeuS Ver.)	e.one; Choi Hyun-jun; Ki Hui-hyeon	e.one; Choi Hyun-jun	e.one; Choi Hyun-jun	3:39
5.	"Kiss Me" (키스해줘; BinChaenHyunSeuS Ver.)	Park Hyun-joong; Peter Pan	Park Hyun-joong; Peter Pan	Park Hyun-joong	3:07
6.	"You Always Try to Be Your Heart" (니맘대로야; BinChaenHyunSeuS Ver.)	Park Hyun-joong; Peter Pan; Sinto	Park Hyun-joong; Peter Pan; Sinto	Park Hyun-joong	4:05
7.	"Darling My Sugar" (L.U.B Ver.)	Marco	Marco	Marco	3:21
8.	"Only One Bite" (한입만; L.U.B Ver.)	Park Hyun-joong; Peter Pan	Park Hyun-joong; Peter Pan; KRAZYSOUND	KRAZYSOUND	3:20
9.	"I Need Healing" (L.U.B Ver.)	Park Hyun-joong; Peter Pan	Park Hyun-joong; Peter Pan; KRAZYSOUND	KRAZYSOUND	3:25
10.	"#GMGN" (Good Morning & Good Night)	STAINBOYS; Ki Hui-hyeon; Eunjin	STAINBOYS	STAINBOYS	3:12
11.	"Paradise" (파라다이스)	STAINBOYS; Ki Hui-hyeon; Eunjin	STAINBOYS	STAINBOYS	3:43
12.	"Can't Stop" (듣고싶어 (E905); Inst.)		Glory Face; Yokan; Jinli	Glory Face; Yokan	3:40

Love Generation – Normal Edition
No.	Title	Lyrics	Music	Arrangement	Length
1.	"Can't Stop" (듣고싶어 (E905))	Jinli; Long Candy; Glory Face; Yokan	Glory Face; Yokan; Jinli	Glory Face; Yokan	3:40
2.	"You're Different" (넌 달라)	Duble Sidekick; Long Candy	Duble Sidekick; Long Candy	Eastwest	3:26
3.	"You & I" (여.사.친 (우리사이))	Child Playing; Melody Work	Child Playing; Melody Work	Child Playing; Melody Work	3:30
4.	"Can't Stop" (듣고싶어 (E905); Inst.)		Glory Face; Yokan; Jinli	Glory Face; Yokan	3:40

Love Generation – Limited Edition
No.	Title	Lyrics	Music	Arrangement	Length
1.	"Can't Stop" (듣고싶어 (E905))	Jinli; Long Candy; Glory Face; Yokan	Glory Face; Yokan; Jinli	Glory Face; Yokan	3:40
2.	"You're Different" (넌 달라)	Duble Sidekick; Long Candy	Duble Sidekick; Long Candy	Eastwest	3:26
3.	"#GMGN" (Good Morning & Good Night)	STAINBOYS; Ki Hui-hyeon; Eunjin	STAINBOYS	STAINBOYS	3:12
4.	"Paradise" (파라다이스)	STAINBOYS; Ki Hui-hyeon; Eunjin	STAINBOYS	STAINBOYS	3:43
5.	"You & I" (여.사.친 (우리사이))	Child Playing; Melody Work	Child Playing; Melody Work	Child Playing; Melody Work	3:30
6.	"Can't Stop" (듣고싶어 (E905); Inst.)		Glory Face; Yokan; Jinli	Glory Face; Yokan	3:40

Love Generation – BinChaenHyunSeuS (BCHCS) Edition
No.	Title	Lyrics	Music	Arrangement	Length
1.	"LO OK"	e.one; Choi Hyun-jun; Ki Hui-hyeon	e.one; Choi Hyun-jun	e.one; Choi Hyun-jun	3:39
2.	"Kiss Me" (키스해줘; kiseuhaejwo)	Park Hyun-joong; Peter Pan	Park Hyun-joong; Peter Pan	Park Hyun-joong	3:07
3.	"You Always Try to Be Your Heart" (니맘대로야; nimamdaeloya)	Park Hyun-joong; Peter Pan; Sinto	Park Hyun-joong; Peter Pan; Sinto	Park Hyun-joong	4:05
4.	"Can't Stop" (듣고싶어 (E905))	Jinli; Long Candy; Glory Face; Yokan	Glory Face; Yokan; Jinli	Glory Face; Yokan	3:40

Love Generation – L.U.B Edition
No.	Title	Lyrics	Music	Arrangement	Length
1.	"Darling My Sugar"	Marco	Marco	Marco	3:21
2.	"Only One Bite" (한입만; han-ibman)	Park Hyun-joong; Peter Pan	Park Hyun-joong; Peter Pan; KRAZYSOUND	KRAZYSOUND	3:20
3.	"I Need Healing"	Park Hyun-joong; Peter Pan	Park Hyun-joong; Peter Pan; KRAZYSOUND	KRAZYSOUND	3:25
4.	"Can't Stop" (듣고싶어 (E905))	Jinli; Long Candy; Glory Face; Yokan	Glory Face; Yokan; Jinli	Glory Face; Yokan	3:40

Present – Repackaged Edition
No.	Title	Lyrics	Music	Arrangement	Length
1.	"Good Night" (굿밤)	Kim Seung-soo	Kim Seung-soo	Kim Seung-soo	3:08
2.	"Eye Contact"	Kim Seung-soo	Kim Seung-soo	Kim Seung-soo	3:18
3.	"Seoraksan in October" (시월에 설악산; Yebin & Somyi)	Marshmallow	Marshmallow	Marshmallow	4:08
4.	"Present" (선물)	Jinli; Long Candy; Glory Face; Yokan	Glory Face; Yokan; Jinli	Glory Face; Yokan	3:40
5.	"Good Night" (굿밤; inst.)		Kim Seung-soo	Kim Seung-soo	3:08

== Charts ==
Chart (2017)	Peak position
South Korea (Gaon)	7

== Release history ==
Edition	Date	Region	Format	Label
Love Generation	August 22, 2017	Worldwide	Digital download	MBK Entertainment; Interpark
Love Generation	August 22, 2017	South Korea	Digital download	MBK Entertainment; Interpark
Love Generation	August 23, 2017	South Korea	CD	MBK Entertainment; Interpark
Present	October 12, 2017	Worldwide	Digital download	MBK Entertainment; Interpark
Present	October 12, 2017	South Korea	Digital download	MBK Entertainment; Interpark
Present	October 20, 2017	South Korea	CD	MBK Entertainment; Interpark
