= Do It Amazing =

Studio album by DIA
- Released: September 14, 2015
- Recorded: 2015
- Genre: K-pop; dance-pop; ballad
- Length: 37:59
- Language: Korean; Chinese
- Label: MBK; Interpark
- Producer: Shinsadong Tiger; Monster Factory; Bigtone

DIA chronology
Do It Amazing (2015)	Happy Ending (2016)

Singles from Do It Amazing
- 1. "Somehow" Released: September 14, 2015; 2. "My Friend's Boyfriend" Released: October 20, 2015

Do It Amazing is the debut studio album by South Korean girl group DIA. It was released on September 14, 2015, by MBK Entertainment and distributed by Interpark. It consists of 11 tracks with "Somehow" serving as the album's title track.

This marked the only release with the original line-up that included member Seunghee, who left the group in April 2016.

The album peaked at number 11 on the Gaon Album Chart.

== Background and release ==
In late-July 2015, MBK Entertainment announced that they would be debuting a new girl group called DIA in August 2015. It was later pushed back to September 2015. They officially announced that the group would be debuting on September 14.

On September 10, it was announced that the group would be releasing their first full album titled Do It Amazing, consisting of ten tracks, including the title track "Somehow" and its Chinese, acoustic and instrumental version. Their album would be produced by Shinsadong Tiger, Monster Factory and Bigtone and composed by Microdot, Sanchez and actor, Hyun-woo, with members Seunghee and Cathy also taking part in the composition of some songs.

The album was released digitally and physically on September 14, 2015. A few days later, the group released three music videos: a drama version of "Somehow"; "I Wanna Listen To Music"; and "Lean On Me". The music videos were filmed in Hong Kong and Macau.

== Promotion ==
=== Single ===
"Somehow" was released as the group's debut single in conjunction with the album on September 14. A music video teaser was released on August 24.

"My Friend's Boyfriend" was released as a digital single on October 20.

=== Live performances ===
DIA held a debut showcase at the Ilchi Art Hall in Seoul on September 14 and performed the album track.

The group made their debut stage on September 17 on Mnet's M Countdown, followed by performances on KBS' Music Bank, MBC's Show! Music Core and SBS's Inkigayo.

The group return to promotion new track "My Friend's Boyfriend" on October 20 on SBS The Show, followed by performances on MBC's Show Champion, Mnet's M Countdown, KBS' Music Bank, MBC's Show! Music Core and SBS's Inkigayo.

== Commercial performance ==
Do It Amazing debuted and peaked at number 11 on the Gaon Album Chart, on the chart issue dated September 20–26, 2015. The album also debuted at number 36 for the month of September 2015, with 1,684 physical copies sold. The album sold a total of 2,375 physical copies in 2015.

== Track listing ==
No.	Title	Lyrics	Music	Arrangement	Length
1.	"Music Lover" (Intro; 음악 들을래)	Shinsadong Tiger	Shinsadong Tiger; Ki Hui-hyeon	Shinsadong Tiger	1:58
2.	"Lean On Me" (featuring. Microdot)	Shinsadong Tiger; Monster Factory; Microdot; Sanchez	Shinsadong Tiger; Monster Factory	Shinsadong Tiger; Monster Factory	3:45
3.	"Somehow" (왠지)	Shinsadong Tiger; Monster Factory	Shinsadong Tiger; Monster Factory	Shinsadong Tiger; Monster Factory	3:32
4.	"My Friend's Boyfriend" (내 친구의 남자친구)	Shinsadong Tiger; Monster Factory; LE	Shinsadong Tiger; Monster Factory	Shinsadong Tiger	4:00
5.	"My Polaris" (내 마음에 별 하나)	Monster Factory; Daum	Monster Factory	Monster Factory	3:58
6.	"Like Yesterday" (어제처럼)	Monster Factory	Monster Factory; Park Ga-Yeul	Monster Factory	3:26
7.	"Same Place" (제자리)	Monster Factory; Blueblack; Jion	Kim; Upper	Kim; Upper	3:28
8.	"Say Hello"	Monster Factory	Bigtone; 양승욱	Bigtone; 양승욱	3:32
9.	"Somehow" (Chinese Version)	Shinsadong Tiger; Monster Factory	Shinsadong Tiger; Monster Factory	Shinsadong Tiger; Monster Factory	3:32
10.	"Somehow" (Acoustic Version)	Shinsadong Tiger; Monster Factory	Shinsadong Tiger; Monster Factory	Shinsadong Tiger; Monster Factory	3:32
11.	"Somehow" (Instrumental)		Shinsadong Tiger; Monster Factory	Shinsadong Tiger; Monster Factory	3:32
Total length:					37:59

== Charts ==
Chart (2015)	Peak position
South Korea (Gaon Album Chart)	11

== Release history ==
Region	Date	Format	Label
Worldwide	September 14, 2015	Digital download	MBK Entertainment
South Korea	September 14, 2015	Digital download	MBK Entertainment
South Korea	September 14, 2015	CD	MBK Entertainment, Interpark
