= Spell (EP) =

EP by DIA
- Released: September 13, 2016
- Recorded: 2016
- Genres: K-pop; R&B; ballad
- Length: 24:04
- Language: Korean
- Labels: MBK; Interpark
- Producer: Shaun Kim

DIA chronology
Happy Ending (2016)	Spell (2016)	YOLO (2017)

Singles from Spell
- 1. "Mr.Potter" Released: September 13, 2016; 2. "The Love" Released: September 14, 2016

Spell is the second extended play by South Korean girl group DIA. It was released by MBK Entertainment on September 13, 2016, and distributed by Interpark. It consists of seven tracks, including "Mr. Potter", released as the title track.

The EP peaked at number 4 on the Gaon Album Chart. It has sold over 13,000 physical copies as of October 2016.

== Background and release ==
On August 11, MBK Entertainment released teaser images for Mr. Potter which will be the title track of their new comeback album to-be released on September 12. The theme of the comeback is "Harry Poster" which will be produced by Shaun Kim. On August 30, MBK Entertainment announced that the album release date will be postponed to a day later and the new album will be released on September 13 instead.

From September 2 to September 3, DIA released teaser images for both the group and individual members. On September 2, a teaser video of the title track "Mr.Potter" was released. On September 6, DIA released individual teaser videos for "Mr.Potter". In addition, one of the songs included in the album Flower, Wind and You which is member Hui-hyeon's solo song will also feature vocals by IOI's Jeon Somi, Choi Yoojung and Kim Chungha. On September 9, DIA announced that they will be re-recording the fan song "The Love" after an online leak and will be released on September 14 with a new version. The full music videos for "Mr.Potter" and "The Love" were released on September 13 and September 14 at 12AM KST respectively.

== Commercial performance ==
Spell debuted and peaked at number 4 on the Gaon Album Chart, on the chart issue dated September 25 - October 1, 2016, achieving a new peak for the group, as their first EP peaked at number 7. It also debuted at number 9 on the chart for the month of September 2016 with 10,266 physical copies. The EP sold 13,405 physical copies in 2016, being the first release by the group to surpass the 10,000 copies.

== Track listing ==
Digital Edition
No.	Title	Lyrics	Music	Arrangement	Length
1.	"7과 4분의3 (널+만나러+가는+길)"	Shaun Kim; STAINBOYS; Ki Hui-hyeon; Baek Ye-bin	Shaun Kim; STAINBOYS; Ki Hui-hyeon	Shaun Kim; STAINBOYS; Ki Hui-hyeon	2:37
2.	"Mr. Potter"	Shaun Kim; STAINBOYS	Shaun Kim; STAINBOYS	Shaun Kim; STAINBOYS	3:34
3.	"Flower, Wind and You" (꽃, 바람 그리고 너; DIA Ver.)	똘아이박; Peterpan; Ki Hui-hyeon	똘아이박; Peterpan	똘아이박	3:21
4.	"화가" (Hui-hyeon solo)	Ki Hui-hyeon	똘아이박; Peterpan; Ki Hui-hyeon	똘아이박	3:06
5.	"#더럽" (The Love...)	노는어린이; Yoon Young-min; DIA	노는어린이; Yoon Young-min; Kim Nam-young	노는어린이; Yoon Young-min; Kim Nam-young	3:56
6.	"Mr.Potter" (Instrumental Ver.)		Shaun Kim; STAINBOYS	Shaun Kim; STAINBOYS	3:34
7.	"#더럽 (The love...)" (Instrumental Ver.)		노는어린이; Yoon Young-min; Kim Nam-young	노는어린이; Yoon Young-min; Kim Nam-young	3:56
Total length:					24:04

Physical Edition
No.	Title	Lyrics	Music	Arrangement	Length
4.	"Flower, Wind and You" (꽃, 바람 그리고 너; Hui-hyeon featuring I.O.I's Somi, Chungha, Yoojung)	똘아이박; Peterpan; Ki Hui-hyeon	똘아이박; Peterpan	똘아이박	3:27

Notes

- "Flower, Wind and You" featuring I.O.I's Somi, Chungha and Yoojung, replace the Hui-yeon solo in the physical edition.

== Charts ==
Chart (2016)	Peak position
South Korean Albums (Gaon)	4

== Release history ==
Region	Date	Format	Label
Worldwide	September 13, 2016	Digital download	MBK Entertainment; Interpark
South Korea	September 13, 2016	Digital download	MBK Entertainment; Interpark
South Korea	September 21, 2016	CD	MBK Entertainment; Interpark
