= DIA (group) =

South Korean girl group

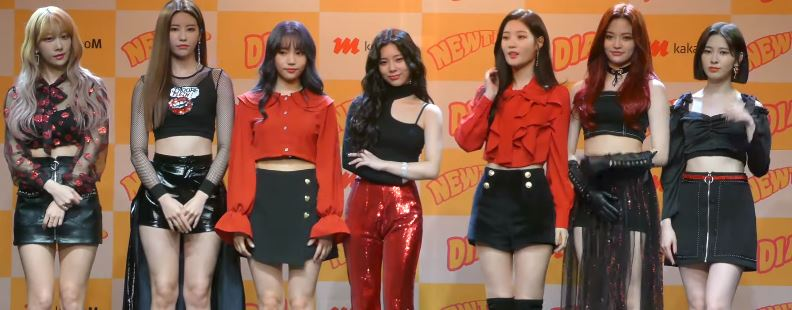
- DIA in March 2019; From left to right: Eunice, Huihyeon, Jueun, Eunchae, Chaeyeon, Somyi (former), Yebin

Background information
- Origin: Seoul, South Korea
- Genre: K-pop
- Years active: 2015–2022 (Note: Indefinite hiatus)
- Labels: MBK; PocketDol Studio
- Spinoffs: BinChaenHyunSeuS; L.U.B
- Members: Eunice; Jueun; Huihyeon; Yebin; Chaeyeon; Eunchae
- Past members: Seunghee; Jenny; Eunjin; Somyi
- Website: DIA

DIA (/ˈdaɪə/; Korean: 다이아; shortened from DIAMOND and backronym for Do It Amazing) is a South Korean girl group formed by MBK Entertainment. The group was composed of six members: Eunice, Jueun, Huihyeon, Yebin, Chaeyeon and Eunchae. DIA officially debuted on September 14, 2015, with their lead single "Somehow" from their debut album Do It Amazing.

Seunghee left the group in April 2016 after her contract expired and she would pursue her acting career. In May 2018, Eunjin decided to leave the group for health reasons. Jenny later left the group in July 2019, similarly for health reasons like Eunjin. In January 2022, Somyi departed the group after deciding to terminate her exclusive contract. In September 2022, all the remaining members departed from PocketDol following the expiration of their contracts and the group is currently on a hiatus due to the members focusing on their individual activities under different labels.

== History ==
=== 2015: Do It Amazing ===
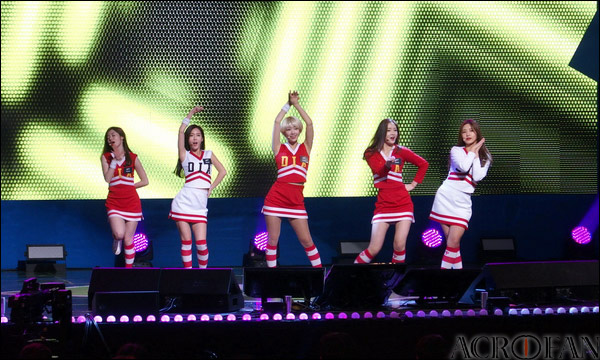
DIA performing as five on December 24, 2015.

In February 2015, MBK Entertainment announced its plans to debut a new girl group. Originally, the company had decided to have possible candidates for their new group compete on a reality survival program. On February 10, Kim Dani was confirmed to be joining the project and announced the program's name T-ara's Little Sister Girl Group. In June, MBK Entertainment announced that they had cancelled their plans for a survival program, and decided to select the members internally. The final three members, Yebin, Eunice, and Jenny were revealed and the group was set to debut in August under the name DIA. MBK announced a line-up with six members: Eunice, Huihyeon (originally under the stage name Cathy), Jenny, Yebin, Eunjin, and Chaeyeon. Seunghee was the final member to be added to the line-up before the group's debut. On September 14, 2015, DIA ultimately released their self-titled debut studio album, Do It Amazing.

=== 2016: Line-up changes, Happy Ending, Spell, and subgroups ===
Eunchae (introduced with her real name Chaewon) joined as a new member in March 2016, and in April, Seunghee was confirmed to have left the group. DIA's first mini-album Happy Ending was released on June 14, 2016, along with the music video for lead single "On the Road" on the same day.

In September 2016, the group released a Harry Potter-themed album titled Spell, with "Mr. Potter" as the lead single. DIA was subsequently separated into two "A" and "B" subgroups, named BinChaenHyunSeuS and L.U.B, releasing songs separately.

=== 2017: New members, YOLO and Love Generation ===
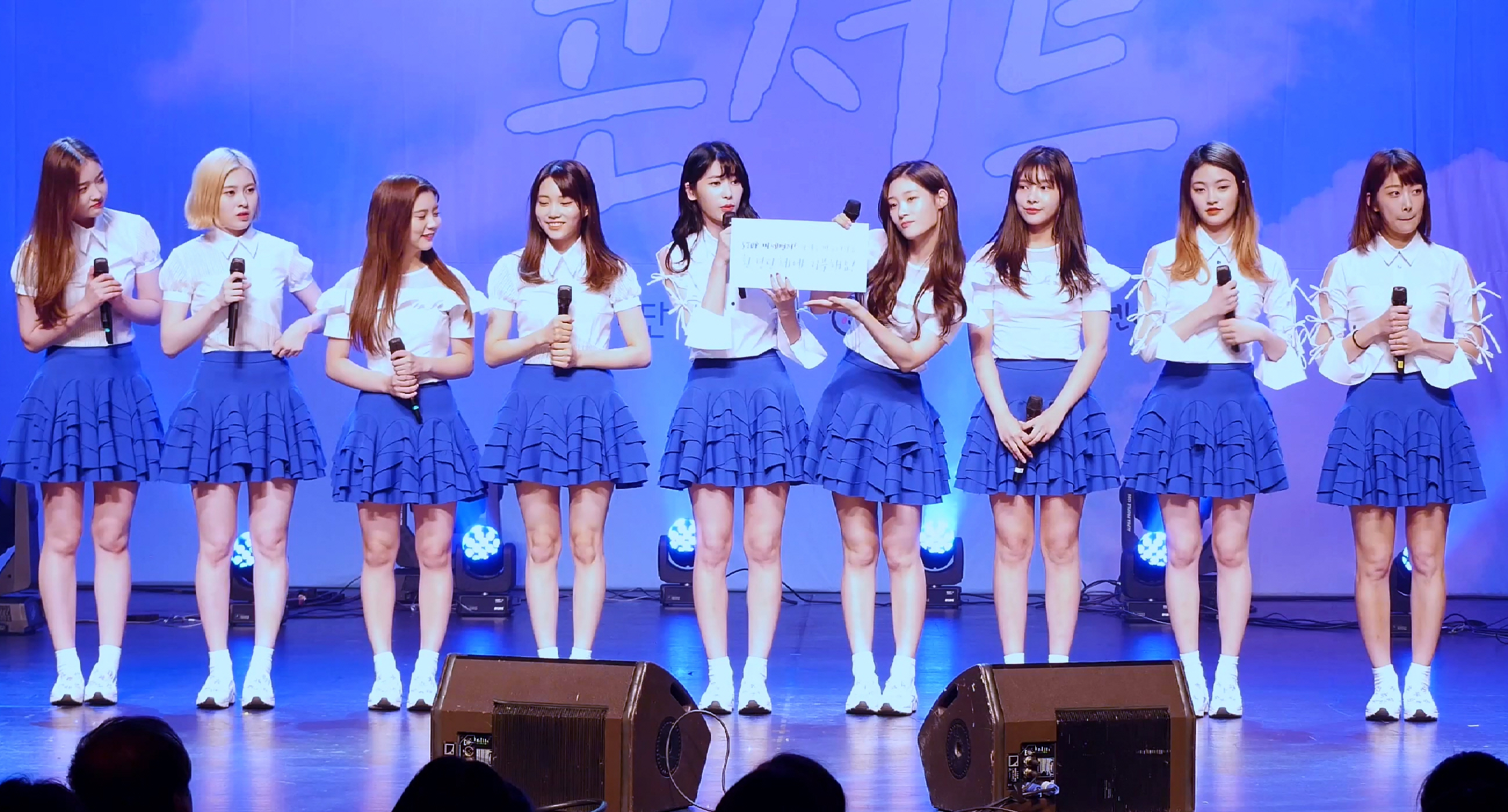
DIA on June 16, 2017.

On April 6, the group released a pre-release single titled "You Are My Flower", which featured trot singers Kim Yeon-ja and Hong Jin-young. DIA's reality show subsequently began airing on April 9 on the TV network Onstyle, days after two new members, Jueun and Somyi, were announced. On April 19, the group's second studio album YOLO was released. The album contained fourteen tracks, with the lead single titled "Will You Go Out with Me?". YOLO also included several tracks composed by the members themselves and featured various artists such as rapper DinDin and former I.O.I member Kim Chung-ha.

DIA's third mini-album titled Love Generation was later released on August 22, 2017. The album contains twelve tracks, with the lead single titled "Can't Stop". On October 12, a repackaged edition of Love Generation, titled Present, was released. It contained the songs from the former, along with four new songs with the title track "Good Night".

=== 2018: Eunjin's departure and Summer Ade ===
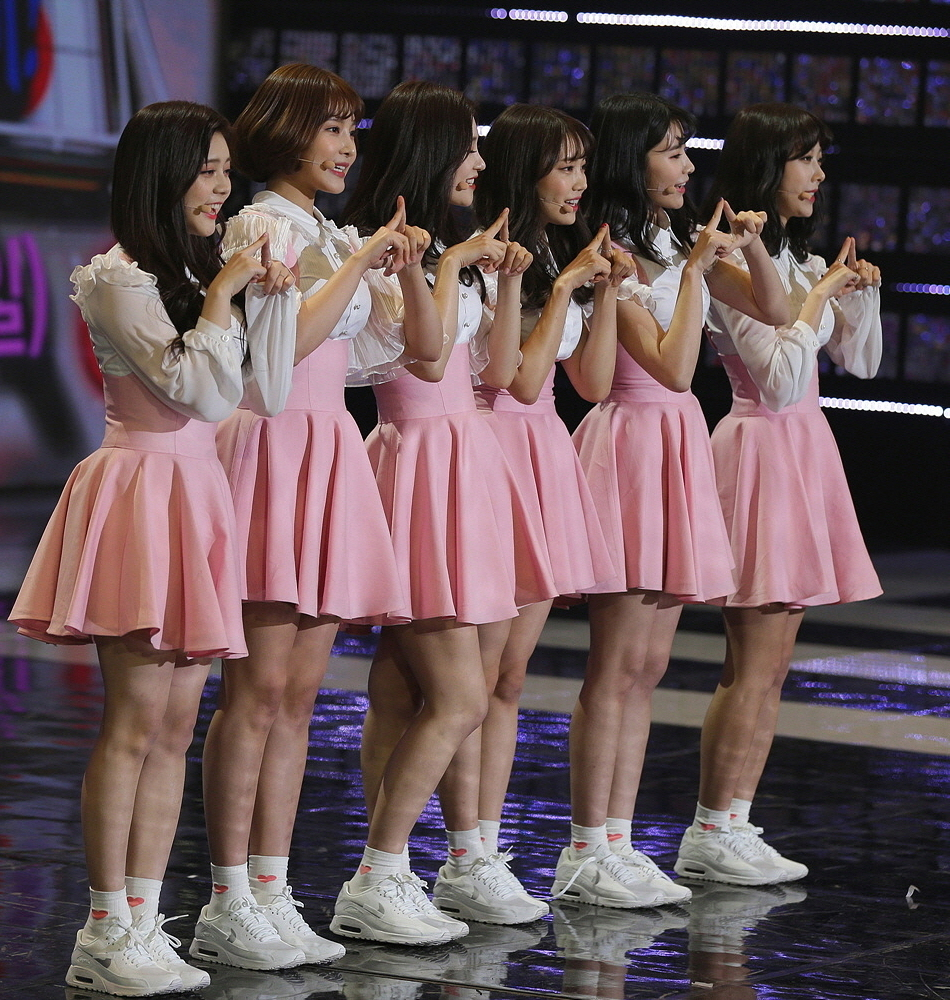
DIA as six on January 30, 2018.

On May 7, 2018, Eunjin announced her departure from the group, citing health problems. On June 9, 2018, it was reported that DIA would make a comeback on July 5, 2018. It had been previously announced that the group were to come back in April with a track produced by Shinsadong Tiger. On the day of the album's purported release, MBK Entertainment released an official statement announcing and apologizing for its postponement saying it was to be released on July 18, but that did not happen, with the company claiming the postponements were to ensure high-quality material. DIA ultimately released on their fourth EP Summer Ade on August 9, 2018, with the title track "Woo Woo". On August 14, the group received their first music show win on SBS MTV's The Show.

=== 2019–2020: Newtro, Jenny's departure and comeback as a unit with Flower 4 Seasons ===
Initially, it was reported that DIA would make a comeback on November 7, 2018, with a "Bo Peep Bo Peep 2.0" produced by Shinsadong Tiger. However, nothing materialized. On February 20, MBK Entertainment confirmed both DIA's comeback and the single would be produced by Shinsadong Tiger and marks their first release as seven members without Jenny due to a knee injury. On March 19, 2019, DIA released their fifth EP titled Newtro alongside its title track "Woowa", after previous reports of a release on March 28 and 21. On July 6, 2019, MBK Entertainment confirmed that Jenny left the group due to health problems with her knee.

On May 25, 2020, it was revealed that DIA would make a comeback with their sixth EP Flower 4 Seasons on June 10, marked their first release under PocketDol Studio. It was confirmed that the group will promote with five members as a unit without Chaeyeon & Somyi.

On November 12, 2020, it was announced that the group would be making a comeback in January 2021, though it never materialized.

=== 2022: Somyi's departure, Rooting for You and hiatus ===
On January 9, 2022, PocketDol confirmed that Somyi had terminated her contract and left DIA.

On May 11, 2022, it was announced that DIA will be releasing their final album in August, before the group's contract ends in September. It was later confirmed that the group is preparing for a comeback in August. It would be the last album before the end of the contract, and there were discussions regarding Chaeyeon's participation in the album.

On September 6, 2022, it was announced that DIA will be releasing their final single under PocketDol Studio Rooting for You on September 15. Later that day, the release of the single was moved forward to September 14 to coincide with the 7th anniversary of the group's debut. The group was initially scheduled to perform on music programs, but were canceled after member Chaeyeon got injured. Yebin highlighted that despite DIA's contracts expiring, the group would not be disbanding and they would still be a group to promote and release albums together in the near future, albeit the members being under different agencies.

== Members ==
Adapted from their Naver profile.

- Eunice (유니스) — vocalist
- Jueun (주은) — vocalist
- Huihyeon (희현) — leader, rapper
- Yebin (예빈) — vocalist
- Chaeyeon (채연) — vocalist
- Eunchae (은채) — vocalist

=== Former ===
- Seunghee (승희) — leader, vocalist
- Eunjin (은진) — rapper
- Jenny (제니) — vocalist
- Somyi (솜이) — vocalist

=== Sub-units ===
- BinChaenHyunSeuS (빈챈현스S) – Eunice, Huihyeon, Yebin, Chaeyeon
- L.U.B – Jueun, Eunchae

== Discography ==
=== Studio albums ===
List of studio albums, with selected details and chart positions
Title	Details	Peak chart positions	Sales
Title	Details	KOR	Sales
Do It Amazing	Released: September 14, 2015; Label: MBK Entertainment; Formats: CD, digital download	11	KOR: 2,412
YOLO	Released: April 19, 2017; Label: MBK Entertainment; Formats: CD, digital download	3	KOR: 18,463; JPN: 218+

=== Extended plays ===
List of extended plays, with selected chart positions and sales
Title	Details	Peak chart positions	Sales
Title	Details	KOR	Sales
Happy Ending	Released: June 14, 2016; Label: MBK Entertainment; Formats: CD, digital download	7	KOR: 9,474
Spell	Released: September 13, 2016; Label: MBK Entertainment; Formats: CD, digital download	4	KOR: 13,405
Love Generation	Released: August 22, 2017; Label: MBK Entertainment; Formats: CD, digital download	7	KOR: 37,044
Love Generation	Repackaged (Present): October 12, 2017; Label: MBK Entertainment; Formats: CD, digital download	12	KOR: 37,044
Summer Ade	Released: August 9, 2018; Label: MBK Entertainment; Formats: CD, digital download	5	KOR: 12,076
Newtro	Released: March 19, 2019; Label: MBK Entertainment; Formats: CD, digital download	8	KOR: 10,576
Flower 4 Seasons	Released: June 10, 2020; Label: MBK Entertainment, PocketDol Studio; Formats: CD, digital download	17	KOR: 6,280

=== Singles ===
List of singles, with selected chart positions, showing year released and album name
Title	Year	Peak chart positions	Sales (digital downloads)	Album
Title	Year	KOR	Sales (digital downloads)	Album
"Somehow" (왠지)	2015	152	KOR: 20,924+	Do It Amazing
"My Friend's Boyfriend" (내 친구의 남자친구)	2015	288	KOR: 4,025+	Do It Amazing
"On the Road" (그 길에서)	2016	48	KOR: 81,811+	Happy Ending
"Mr. Potter" (미스터포터)	2016	103	KOR: 22,828+	Spell
"Will You Go Out with Me?" (나랑사귈래?)	2017	78	KOR: 27,708+	YOLO
"Can't Stop" (듣고싶어)	2017	— (Note: "Can't Stop" did not enter the Gaon Digital Chart, but peaked at number 89 on Download component chart.)	KOR: 19,159+	Love Generation
"Good Night" (굿밤)	2017	—	—N/a	Present
"WooWoo" (우우)	2018	— (Note: "Woo Woo" did not enter the Gaon Digital Chart, but peaked at number 82 on Download component chart.)	—N/a	Summer Ade
"Woowa" (우와)	2019	— (Note: "Woowa" did not enter the Gaon Digital Chart, but peaked at number 90 on Download component chart.)	—N/a	Newtro
"Hug U" (감싸줄게요)	2020	— (Note: "Hug U" did not enter the Gaon Digital Chart, but peaked at number 106 on Download component chart.)	—N/a	Flower 4 Seasons
"The blinding past" (눈부셨던 날)	2022	— (Note: "The blinding past" did not enter the Circle Digital Chart, but peaked at number 83 on Download component chart.)	—N/a	Rooting for You
"—" denotes releases that did not chart or were not released in that region.

=== Collaborations ===
List of collaborations, with selected chart positions, showing year released and album name
Title	Year	Peak chart positions	Sales (digital downloads)	Album
Title	Year	KOR	Sales (digital downloads)	Album
"You Are My Flower" (꽃, 달, 술) (with Kim Yonja, Hong Jin-young)	2017	—	—N/a	Non-album single
"—" denotes releases that did not chart or were not released in that region.

=== Soundtrack appearances ===
List of soundtrack appearances, with selected chart positions, showing year released and album name
Title	Year	Peak chart positions	Sales (digital downloads)	Album
Title	Year	KOR	Sales (digital downloads)	Album
"Will You Go Out with Me" (Insert Song by Cocoa) (나랑 사귈래 (투제니 삽입곡 by 코코아))	2018	—	—N/a	TO.JENNY OST Part.2
"—" denotes releases that did not chart or were not released in that region.

=== Compilation appearances ===
Title	Year	Album	Track No.
"Highway Romance" (고속도로 로망스)	2016	Immortal Song 2: Singing the Legend (Kim Jang-hoon)	1
"Men are a Bother to Women" (남자는 여자를 귀찮게 해)	2017	Immortal Song 2: Singing the Legend (Kim Hee-Gap & Yang In-ja)	2
"Unconditional" (무조건)	2017	Immortal Song 2: Singing the Legend (Composer Park Hyun-jin)	1
"He Doesn't Miss Me" (보고 싶지도 않은가 봐)	2018	Immortal Song 2: Singing the Legend (Bunny Girls)	3

== Videography ==
=== Music videos ===
Title	Year	Director
"Somehow"	2015	—N/a
"Lean on Me" (feat. Microdot)	2015	—N/a
"My Friend's Boyfriend"	2015	—N/a
"On the Road"	2016	TIGERCAVE
"Mr. Potter"	2016	TIGERCAVE
"The Love"	2016	—N/a
"Will You Go Out with Me?"	2017	—N/a
"LO OK" (as BinChaenHyunSeuS)	2017	Youngeum Lee (OGG Visual)
"Darling My Sugar" (as L.U.B.)	2017	Youngeum Lee (OGG Visual)
"Can't Stop (E905)"	2017	SUSHIVISUAL
"Good Night"	2017	—N/a
"WooWoo"	2018	Hong Won-Ki (Zanybros)
"Woowa"	2019	—N/a
"Hug U"	2020	—N/a
"The Blinding Past"	2022	—N/a

== Awards and nominations ==
=== Gaon Chart Music Awards ===
Year	Nominee / work	Award	Result
2016	DIA	New Artist of the Year	Won

=== Seoul Music Awards ===
Year	Nominee / work	Award	Result
2016	DIA	Bonsang Award	Nominated
2016	DIA	New Artist Award	Nominated
2016	DIA	Popularity Award	Nominated
2016	DIA	Hallyu Special Award	Nominated
2018	DIA	Bonsang Award	Nominated
2018	DIA	Popularity Award	Nominated
2018	DIA	Hallyu Special Award	Nominated

=== Asia Artist Awards ===
Year	Nominee / work	Award	Result
2016	DIA	Most Popular Artist (Singer)	Nominated
2017	DIA	Rising Star Award	Won

=== AfreecaTV BJ Awards ===
Year	Nominee / work	Award	Result
2015	DIA	Special Idol Awards	Won

=== Korean Culture and Entertainment Awards ===
Year	Nominee / work	Award	Result
2016	DIA	Kpop Singer Award	Won

=== Soribada Best K-Music Awards ===
Year	Nominee / work	Award	Result
2017	DIA	Photogenic Award	Won
2017	DIA	Popularity Award	Nominated
2018	DIA	New Hallyu Performance Award	Won

=== Melon Music Awards ===
Year	Nominee / work	Award	Result
2017	"You Are My Flower" (Hong Jin Young, DIA and Kim Yeon-ja)	Best Trot	Nominated
