= Happy Ending (EP) =

EP by DIA
- Released: June 14, 2016
- Recorded: 2016
- Genre: K-pop; R&B; ballad
- Length: 22:44
- Language: Korean
- Label: MBK; Interpark

DIA chronology
Do It Amazing (2015)	Happy Ending (2016)	Spell (2016)

Singles from Happy Ending
- 1. "On The Road" Released: June 14, 2016

Happy Ending is the debut extended play by the South Korean girl group DIA. It was released by MBK Entertainment on June 14, 2016, and distributed by Interpark. It consists of seven tracks, including "On The Road", which was released as the EP's title track.

This release marked the return of members Heehyun and Chaeyeon, after their hiatus in order to participate on Mnet's survival show, Produce 101. It also marked the first release without member Seunghee and the first release with member Eunchae.

The EP peaked at number 7 on the Gaon Album Chart.

== Background ==
Members Heehyun and Chaeyeon joined the survival show Produce 101 in 2015 and due to this, they had to temporarily withdraw from the group. Meanwhile, MBK Entertainment added a new member to the group, Eunchae, on March 7, 2016. The company then announced that Heehyun and Chaeyeon will be joining the group for an upcoming comeback in June. The group filmed their new music video in Jeju Island and will be returning without Seunghee, who left to pursue an acting career after her contract expired on April 30. Since April, Chaeyeon has been promoting with I.O.I after ranking 7th on Produce 101 and debuting in the group. I.O.I's promotions for their debut album ended on June 4, allowing Chaeyeon to return to DIA while I.O.I promotes in sub-units before she returns to promote with the group until their 1-year contract with YMC Entertainment ends.

== Promotion ==
The group appeared with its new lineup for the first time on a Naver V-app broadcast held on June 7.

=== Single ===
"On The Road" was released as the title track in conjunction with the EP on June 14. The music video was filmed in Jeju Island.

=== Live performances ===
The group held a comeback showcase at Lotte Card Art Center on June 14. They started music show promotions on June 16 on M Countdown.

== Commercial performance ==
Happy Ending debuted and peaked at number 7 on the Gaon Album Chart, on the chart issue dated June 12–18, 2016, achieving a new peak for the group, as their debut album peaked at number 11. The EP also debuted at number 24 on the chart for the month of June 2016, with 4,820 physical copies sold. The EP sold 9,474 physical copies in 2016.

== Track listing ==
Digital download
No.	Title	Lyrics	Music	Arrangement	Length
1.	"Happy Ending"	Iggy; Seo Young-bae; Ki Hee-hyun	Iggy; Seo Young-bae	Iggy; Seo Young-bae	3:18
2.	"On The Road" (그 길에서)	Iggy; Seo Young-bae; Ki Hee-hyun	Iggy; Seo Young-bae	Iggy; Seo Young-bae	3:22
3.	"The Trainee" (연습생)	DIA	Ahn Young-min	Ahn Young-min	4:16
4.	"Waiting For You" (널 기다려) (Yebin solo)	Baek Ye-bin	Baek Ye-bin	Ahn Young-min	3:03
5.	"Remember" (기억할게요) (Eunchae solo)	Eunchae	Baek Ye-bin; Ki Hee-hyun	Ahn Young-min	2:41
6.	"Waiting For You" (널 기다려) (DIA Version)	Baek Ye-bin; Ki Hee-hyun	Baek Ye-bin	Ahn Young-min	3:22
7.	"On The Road" (그 길에서) (Inst.)		Iggy; Seo Young-bae	Iggy; Seo Young-bae	3:22
Total length:					23:23

== Charts ==
Chart (2016)	Peak position
South Korea (Gaon Album Chart)	7

== Release history ==
Region	Date	Format	Label
Worldwide	June 14, 2016	Digital download	MBK Entertainment
South Korea	June 14, 2016	Digital download	MBK Entertainment
South Korea	June 14, 2016	CD	MBK Entertainment, Interpark
