= YOLO (album) =

- (Top): Jenny, Heehyun, Jueun, Eunjin, Eunice and Somyi (Bottom): Chaeyeon, Eunchae and Yebin

Studio album by DIA
- Released: April 19, 2017
- Recorded: 2016–2017
- Genre: Bubblegum pop; trot; soft rock; R&B; ballad
- Length: 57:06
- Language: Korean
- Label: MBK; LOEN (digital); Interpark (physical)

DIA chronology
| Spell (2016) | YOLO (2017) | Love Generation (2017) |

Singles from YOLO
- 1. "You Are My Flower" Released: April 6, 2017; 2. "Will You Go Out With Me?" Released: April 19, 2017

YOLO is the second studio album by South Korean girl group DIA which was released on April 19, 2017 by MBK Entertainment.

This marks their first release with the additions of Jueun and Somyi and first release as their nine member-group.

== Background and release ==
On March 31 MBK Entertainment confirmed that the album would be released on April 19 on March 31 along with the reality show YOLO TRIP. Their first dance performance for the title track 'Will You Go Out With Me?' was on their first concert titled "First Miracle" at Yes24 Live Hall. The first band performance for the title track was on their mini concert titled "On The Record" on April 7 at Blue Square.

Two new members are introduced in this album, Jueun and Somyi. 'You Are My Flower' was released as a pre-release single for the album on April 6. Upon release, it charted at number one on Melon's Trot Songs Daily Chart.

== Track listing ==
| No. | Title | Lyrics | Music | Arrangement | Length |
|---|---|---|---|---|---|
| 1. | "Will You Go Out With Me?" (나랑 사귈래) | Eunice; Huihyeon; Jenny; Yebin; Eunjin; Chaeyeon; Ddoli Park; Peter Pan | Eunice; Huihyeon; Jenny; Yebin; Ddoli Park; Peter Pan | Two Champ | 3:11 |
| 2. | "Boyfriend" (남.사.친) | Eunice; Huihyeon; Jenny; Yebin; Eunjin; Yoon Young Min; Kim Won Hyun | Eunice; Huihyeon; Jenny; Yoon Young Min; Kim Won Hyun; Kim Dong Ha | Yoon Young Min; Kim Dong Ha; Kim Won Hyun | 2:47 |
| 3. | "April (사월)" (featuring DinDin) | Huihyeon; Eunjin; Yebin; Face Of Glory; Jin Ri; Din Din | Yebin; Face Of Glory; Jin Ri; Dawn; Long Candy | Face Of Glory; Dawn | 3:59 |
| 4. | "Mannequin" (마네킹) | Eunice; Huihyeon; Jenny; Eunjin; Yebin; Chaeyeon; Stainboys | Eunice; Huihyeon; Jenny; Yebin; Chaeyeon; Stainboys | Stainboys | 3:37 |
| 5. | "You Are My Flower (꽃, 달, 술)" (with Kim Yeon Ja, Hong Jin Young) | Eunice; Yebin; Chaeyeon; 79 | Eunice; Yebin; Chaeyeon; 79 | 79 | 4:21 |
| 6. | "Light" (빛) | Eunice; Huihyeon; Jenny; Eunjin; Yebin; Eunchae; Ddoli Park; Peter Pan | Eunice; Huihyeon; Jenny; Yebin; Ddoli Park; Peter Pan | Ddoli Park | 3:48 |
| 7. | "There Is No Time (시간이 없어)" (Huihyeon featuring Kim Chung-ha) | Huihyeon; Slapstick | Huihyeon; Slapstick | Slapstick | 3:34 |
| 8. | "Listen To This Song" (이 노래 들어볼래) | Huihyeon; Eunjin; Yebin; Face Of Glory; Jin Ri; Din Din | Yebin; Face Of Glory; Dawn; Long Candy | Face Of Glory; Dawn | 3:58 |
| 9. | "Not Only You But Spring" (너만 모르나 봄) | Huihyeon; Eunjin; Yebin; Eunchae; Kim Won Hyun | Yebin; Kim Won Hyun; Melody Workshop | Kim Won Hyun; Melody Workshop | 3:45 |
| 10. | "Independence Movement Day" (乾坤坎離) | Eunice; Huihyeon; Jenny; Eunjin; Yebin; Chaeyeon; Eunchae | Eunice; Huihyeon; Jenny; Yebin; Ddoli Park; Peter Pan | Ddoli Park; Krazysound | 5:02 |
| 11. | "Will You Go Out With Me?" (2016) | Eunice; Huihyeon; Jenny; Yebin; Eunjin; Chaeyeon; Ddoli Park; Peter Pan | Eunice; Huihyeon; Jenny; Yebin; Ddoli Park; Peter Pan | Ddoli Park; Peter Pan | 3:12 |
| 12. | "You Are My Flower" (DIA only version) | Eunice; Yebin; Chaeyeon; 79 | Eunice; Yebin; Chaeyeon; 79 | 79 | 4:21 |
| 13. | "Will You Go Out With Me?" (Ballad version) | Eunice; Huihyeon; Jenny; Eunjin; Yebin; Chaeyeon; Ddoli Park; Peter Pan | Eunice; Huihyeon; Jenny; Yebin; Ddoli Park; Peter Pan | Stainboys | 4:56 |
| 14. | "Will You Go Out With Me?" (Instrumental) | | Eunice; Huihyeon; Jenny; Yebin; Ddoli Park; Peter Pan | Two Champ | 3:11 |
| Total length: | | | | | 57:06 |

== Charts ==
| Chart (2017) | Peak position |
|---|---|
| Gaon Album Chart | 3 |
| Oricon Albums Chart | 295 |

== Release history ==
| Region | Date | Format | Label |
|---|---|---|---|
| South Korea | April 19, 2017 | CD, digital download | MBK Entertainment; LOEN Entertainment; Interpark |
| Worldwide | April 19, 2017 | Digital download | MBK Entertainment; LOEN Entertainment |
