= Ki Hui-hyeon =

South Korean singer (born 1995)

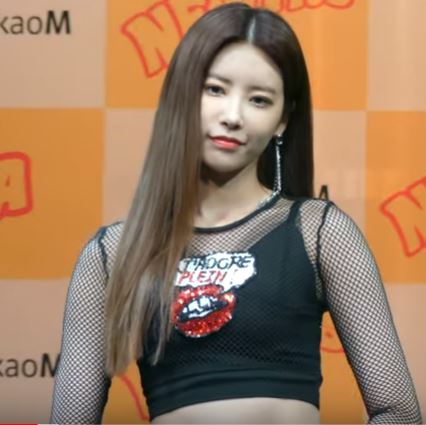
- Ki in March 2019
- Born: Ki Hui-hyeon; June 16, 1995 (age 31); Namwon, South Korea
- Other name: Cathy
- Occupations: Singer-songwriter; rapper; actress
- Agent: Hicon Entertainment
- Musical career
- Genres: K-pop; hip-hop
- Instrument: Vocals
- Years active: 2015–present
- Labels: MBK; PocketDol Studio
- Formerly of: DIA; BinChaenHyunSeuS

Korean name
- Hangul: 기희현
- Hanja: 奇熙賢
- RR: Gi Huihyeon
- MR: Ki Hŭihyŏn

Ki Hui-hyeon (Korean: 기희현; born June 16, 1995), known mononymously as Huihyeon and formerly known as Cathy, is a South Korean singer, songwriter, rapper and actress. She was best known as a member of the girl group DIA. In September 2022, Huihyeon transitioned into acting and joined Hicon Entertainment.

== Early life ==
Ki was born on June 16, 1995, in Namwon, South Korea.

== Career ==
=== Pre-debut ===
Ki is a former Woollim Entertainment trainee and trained with members of the girl group Lovelyz.

=== 2015–present: Debut and Produce 101 ===
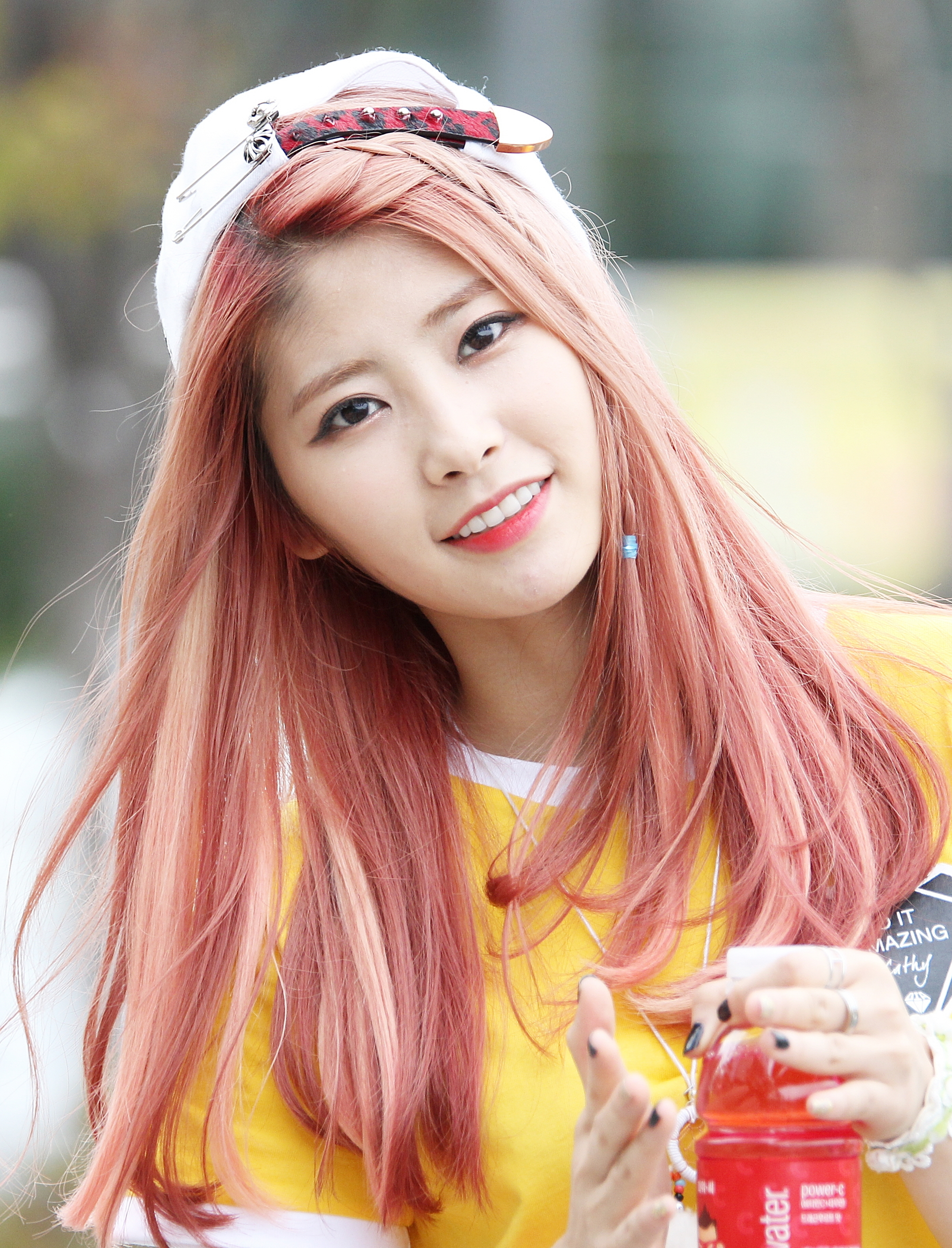
Ki in 2015

In February 2015, MBK Entertainment announced its plans to debut a new girl group under survival program through which the public could become familiar with the group members. In June 2015, MBK announced that they had canceled their plans for a survival program, and decided to select the members internally. MBK Entertainment revealed the final line-up and the group name.

Ki debuted under stage name Cathy as the rapper of DIA. The group made their official debut stage on the music program Mnet's M Countdown on September 17, 2015. Shortly after debut with the group in December 2015, MBK Entertainment announced she had temporarily withdrawn from the group, along with her bandmate Jung Chae-yeon, to represent MBK Entertainment on reality girl group survival show Produce 101 for the chance to debut in a Mnet girl group. She auditioned and signed contracts with the show before DIA's official debut. Ki finished in 19th place. On May 11, 2016, MBK Entertainment confirmed that she and Jung Chae-yeon had re-joined DIA. She has changed her stage name from Cathy to her real name (Huihyeon) since rejoining the group. On August 17, it was announced that Ki would be collaborating with I.O.I members Choi Yoo-jung and Jeon So-mi for the digital single, "Flower, Wind and You", which was produced by Boi B. She is the current leader of the group, starting from the promotions of the mini album Spell.

In 2016, she also appeared on Mnet's rap survival program Unpretty Rapstar 3 as a contestant.

In September 2019, Ki participated in the survival program show, V-1, to select the Vocal Queen among the various girl group members, where only the top 12 girl group members in votes would progress and perform on the show. However, she was not selected among the final members to perform on stage. She was also cast in a drama 패셔니스타, aired on Ssulrandi and YouTube.

In September 2022, Ki signed a contract with Hicon Entertainment as an actress.

== Discography ==
=== Singles ===
Title	Year	Peaks	Sales (DL)	Album
Title	Year	KOR	Sales (DL)	Album
"Flower, Wind and You" (꽃, 바람 그리고 너) (with Jeon Somi, Choi Yoo-jung and Chungha)	2016	42	KOR: 38,862+	Non-album single
"—" denotes releases that did not chart or were not released in that region.

=== Other songs ===
Title	Year	Album
"Artist" (화가)	2016	Spell
"There Is No Time" (featuring Chungha)	2017	YOLO

== Filmography ==
=== Television series ===
Year	Title	Role	Notes	Ref.
2016	Drinking Solo	Herself	Cameo	
2016	Happy Ending	Ki Hui-hyeon	DIA music drama	
2019	Fashionista		Lead role	
2020	Homemade Love Story	Herself	Cameo	
2021	Love in Black Hole	Anna	Lead role	

=== Television shows ===
Year	Title	Role	Notes	Ref.
2016	Produce 101	Contestant	Survival show that determined I.O.I members Finished 19th	
2017	Unpretty Rapstar 3	Contestant	Additional Match Contestant	
2019	Cabin Crew	Cast member	Episodes 4–11	
2019	V-1	Contestant		
