= Nol Universe =

South Korean entertainment company

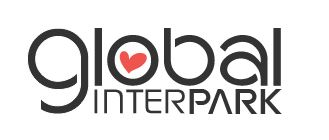
- Native name: 놀유니버스
- Type: Public
- Industry: eCommerce; Entertainment; Retail; Music Industry
- Founded: 1996
- Headquarters: Seoul, Korea
- Key people: Lee Ki Hyeong, Kang Dong Hwa
- Services: Online auction; Shopping mall; Electronic commerce; Licensing; Record distribution
- Revenue: ▲$61.9 million USD (2014)
- Parent: Yanoljia Co. Ltd.
- Website: Official website

Nol Universe, formerly known as Interpark is a South Korean company launched as an online auction website and shopping mall. In 2014, it entered the Korean music industry as a record distributor.

== History ==
1996 - Established the first online shopping mall, Interpark, by Lee Ki Hyung

1997 - Started online bookstore service

1999 - Listed on KOSDAQ. Started online tour booking service.

2000 - Selected as ticket sales agency of 2002 FIFA World Cup. Established Interpark Gmarket

2002 - Successfully completed its role as ticket sales agency of 2002 FIFA World Cup

2004 - Ranked as number one online bookstore. Started online open market service

2006 - Established Interpark Mobile. Listed Interpark Gmarket on NASDAQ.

2008 - Established Interpark International, Global M&S Co., LTD. Established Interpark INT (merge shopping, bookstore, ENT).

2009 - Changed CL. Sold Interpark Gmarket to eBay.

2011 - Took over IMK (I Market Korea), a MRO firm. Established Interpark Global (US) and logistic center in US.

2014 - Launched Global shopping site. Listed Interpark INT on KOSDAQ. Entered the music industry through the release of Hotel King OST.

2018- Established on March 16, 2018, Interpark Academy, then the company changed to its current name on July 6, 2021.

2021- On July 21, 2021, Interpark announced that it established a subsidiary label, Interpark Music Plus, for its idol group production business, that same year the girl group Laboum signed a contract with them. It is also shown that the label is preparing to launch a new male idol group during the year. The same year, Yanolja, Korea's leading hospitality platform, acquired 70% of Interpark's commerce business for $260 million.

2022- Interpark Music Plus announced its first male idol group called Trendz. Trendz made their debut on January 5, 2022, with their first mini album "Blue Set Chapter 1. Tracks". Interpark merged with Triple and rebranded as Interpark Triple.

2024- Interpark Triple launched TRIPLE Korea, a global travel platform created for foreign tourists visiting Korea.

== Items and services ==
Collectibles, appliances, computers, furniture, equipment, vehicles, food, tickets, clothes, jewellery and many other categories of items are listed, bought and sold via Interpark. Started as Korea's first online shopping mall, Interpark expanded into tickets, online bookstore and tour bookings.

Interpark provides international service, in English, Chinese and Japanese through its global website, Global Interpark.

Around 20 million members are registered and more than 47 million products are listed on Interpark platform.

Interpark covers all area of business including B2B, B2C and C2C.

== Global site ==
In October 2014, Interpark launched a global version of its site, "Global Interpark". Global Interpark operates in Korean, English, Chinese and Japanese. Global Interpark offers international shipping to over 230 countries. Global Interpark offers payment options including PayPal, Alipay and major credit card company.

Global Interpark is mainly a ticket platform that offers a wide range of K-pop concerts, musicals, classics, plays, and more. After the merger between Interpark and Triple, the travel app TRIPLE Korea was launched, and Global Interpark was integrated into TRIPLE Korea in 2024.

== Profit and transactions ==
Interpark generates its income by collecting service fees from sellers. Some items are directly sold by Interpark.

The total transaction amount in year 2014 was US$545 million. The online book store department's total transaction amount was US$204 million.

== See also ==
- Electronic commerce
- Online auction business model
- Shopping mall

== Labels ==
- Interpark Music Plus
