= P-Type (rapper) =

South Korean rapper

- Born: Kang Jin-pil
- Origin: South Korea
- Genre: Korean hip hop
- Occupation: Rapper
- Years active: 2004–present

Korean name
- Hangul: 강진필
- RR: Gang Jinpil
- MR: Kang Chinp'il

Kang Jin-pil (Korean: 강진필), better known by the stage name P-Type (피타입), is a South Korean rapper. He began his career as an underground rapper in the 1990s and released his debut studio album, Heavy Bass, in 2004. He gained mainstream attention after appearing on the reality TV shows Show Me the Money 4 and Show Me the Money 6, in 2015 and 2017, respectively.

== Discography ==
=== Studio albums ===
| Title | Album details | Peak chart positions | Sales |
| Title | Album details | KOR | Sales |
|---|---|---|---|
| Heavy Bass | Released: May 31, 2004; Label: Foundation Records; Format: CD | — | —N/a |
| The Vintage | Released: November 27, 2008; Label: Loen Entertainment; Format: CD | —N/a* | —N/a* |
| Rap | Released: July 29, 2013; Label: Brand New Music; Format: CD, digital download | 42 | —N/a |
| Street Poetry | Released: March 30, 2015; Label: Brand New Music; Format: CD, digital download | 18 | KOR: 766+ |
"—" denotes album did not chart. * Data for 2008 is incomplete.

=== Singles ===
| Title | Year | Peak chart positions | Sales | Album |
| Title | Year | KOR | Sales | Album |
As lead artist
| "Soulfire" | 2006 | —N/a* | —N/a* | Soulfire single album |
| "Die Hard" feat. Ali, MC Meta of Garion | 2013 | — | —N/a | Rap |
| "Twisted" (불편한 관계) feat. San E, Sojung of Ladies' Code | 2013 | 100 | KOR: 18,208+ | Non-album single |
| "Timberland 6" feat. Nuck of Soul Dive | 2014 | — | —N/a | Street Poetry |
| "Gwanghwamun" (광화문) feat. Taewan | 2015 | — | —N/a | Street Poetry |
| "Birdman" | 2015 | — | KOR: 21,949+ | Non-album singles |
| "Time Lag 2" (시차적응2) feat. Verbal Jint | 2015 | — | —N/a | Non-album singles |
| "Lazyyy" (게으르으게) feat. Gummy | 2016 | — | —N/a | Non-album singles |
| "Naked" feat. Chancellor | 2017 | — | —N/a | Non-album singles |
Collaborations
| "Brand New Anthem" with Swings, Rhymer, Heo In-chang, Bizniz, Kanto | 2012 | — | —N/a | Brand New Year |
| "Brand New Day" with Verbal Jint, San E, Phantom, As One, Kanto, Yang Da-il, Taewan, Kang Min-hee of Miss S, Champagne & Candle, DJ It | 2014 | 30 | KOR: 100,723+ | Brand New Year Vol. 3 |
| "Brand New Shit" with Verbal Jint, San E, Phantom, Eluphant, KittiB, Champagne, MC Gree, DJ Juice | 2015 | — | —N/a | Brand New Year 2015 |
| "Here We Stand" (우린 여기에) with Crying Nut | 2016 | — | —N/a | Snowball Project Vol. 3 |
Soundtrack appearances
| "Money" with Swings, feat. Kang Min-hee of Miss S | 2013 | — | KOR: 24,025+ | Incarnation of Money OST |
"—" denotes release did not chart. * The Gaon Digital Chart was launched in 2010.

== Filmography ==
=== Television ===
| Title | Year | Network | Role | Ref. |
|---|---|---|---|---|
| Show Me the Money 4 | 2015 | Mnet | Himself (contestant) | |
| Tribe of Hip Hop | 2016 | JTBC | Himself (producer) | |
| Tribe of Hip Hop 2 | 2016 | JTBC | Himself (producer) | |
| Show Me the Money 6 | 2017 | Mnet | Himself (contestant) | |
