= Chancellor (musician) =

American singer-songwriter and record producer

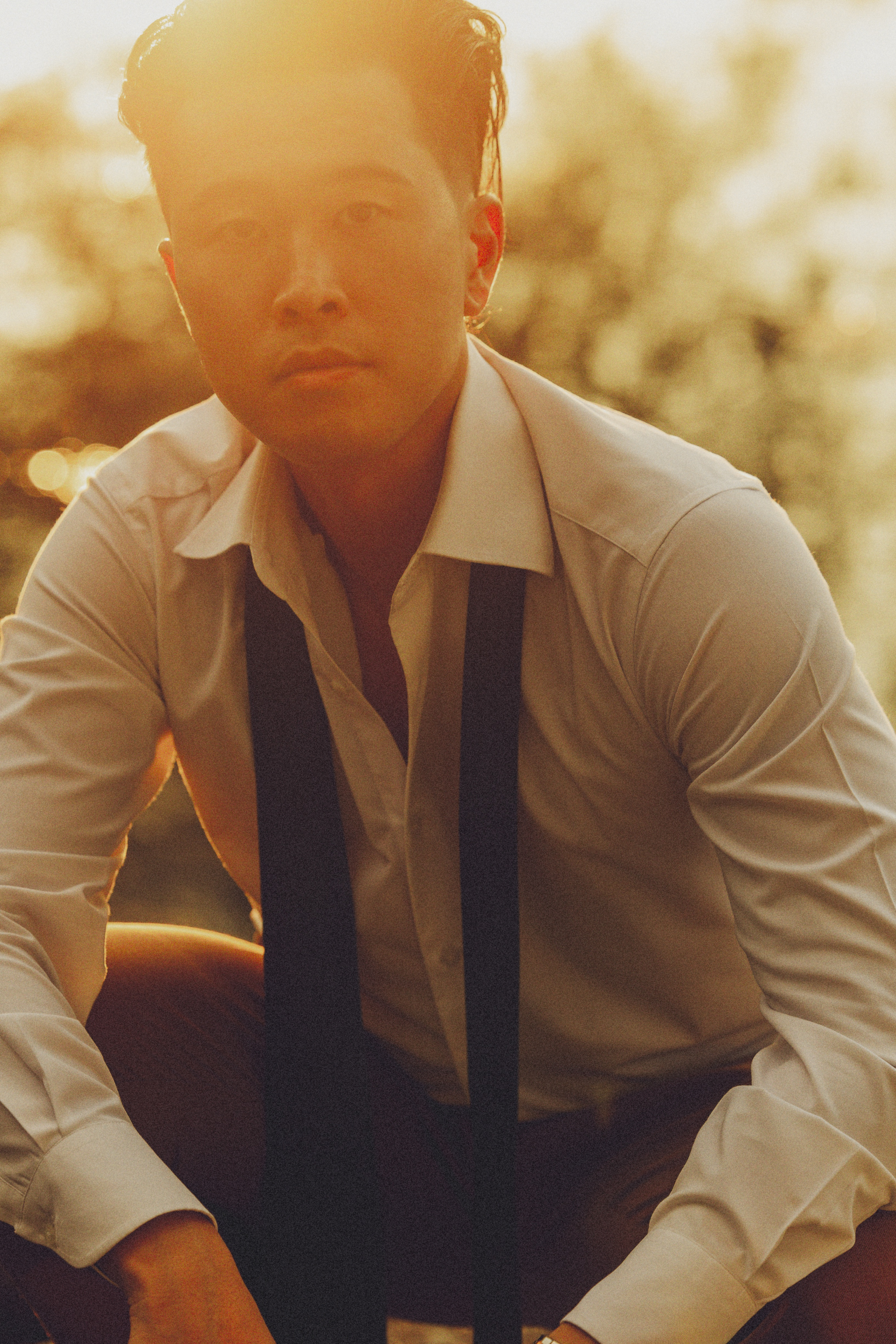
- Chancellor in 2022

Background information
- Also known as: Chance, Mikey
- Born: Kim Jung-seung; October 22, 1986 (age 39); Seoul, South Korea
- Genres: R&B; hip hop
- Occupations: Singer-songwriter; record producer
- Instruments: Vocals; guitar; piano
- Years active: 2010–present
- Labels: Yejeon Media; Duble Kick; Brand New Music; Konnect
- Formerly of: One Way, Duble Sidekick
- Spouse: Unknown (m. 2022)

Korean name
- Hangul: 김정승
- RR: Gim Jeongseung
- MR: Kim Chŏngsŭng

Kim Jung-seung (김정승; born October 22, 1986), better known by his stage name Chancellor (챈슬러), is an American singer-songwriter and record producer. Born in Seoul, his family immigrated to the United States in his youth where he lived until returning to South Korea in 2009. He debuted in the trio One Way the following year, which found little success. He partnered with Park Jang-geun to form the songwriting and production duo Duble Sidekick, which garnered success in 2012. Chancellor left the team two years later to pursue a solo career. He released his debut studio album My Full Name in 2016.

== Life and career ==
Chancellor was born Kim Jung-seung on October 22, 1986, in Seoul, South Korea. He is the son of former Songgolmae bassist Kim Sang-bok. His family immigrated to Los Angeles, California, when he was five or six years old, where his father managed a restaurant. Influenced by his father's musical background, Chancellor took interest in music and enjoyed rapping, singing, and playing the drums. He began teaching himself about mixing and using audio editing software in high school. He attended Berklee College of Music in Boston and majored in Contemporary Writing and Production, where he studied composition and arrangement. Chancellor met rapper Young Sky in the United States, who had met vocalist Peter while living in Australia. Chancellor returned to South Korea in 2009. All three were pursuing music careers in the country, where Chancellor met Peter. Upon discovering their similar tastes in music, they formed the R&B and hip-hop group One Way. With Chancellor bearing responsibility for their lyrics and music compositions as Chance, the trio released their debut mini-album One Way Street and its lead single "Magic" through Yejeon Media in March 2010. He also provided guitar and piano on three tracks.

Chancellor and Park Jang-geun met after being introduced to each other by DMTN's Daniel. Park suggested collaborating with Chancellor after listening to one of his tracks; the pair formed the songwriting and production team Duble Sidekick. Chancellor adopted the name Mikey, and worked on composing and arranging music. He also served as the vice president of Duble Kick Entertainment. In the first half of 2012, the duo were listed within the top ten "hit makers" among musicians registered with the Korea Music Copyright Association. Due to his commitments with Duble Sidekick, Chancellor stepped away from his role in One Way and the group continued with the remaining two members. In an interview with daily newspaper No Cut News, he cited the trio's poor commercial performance and "not seeing a future" as his reasons for leaving the group. He remained contractually bound to Yejeon Media, which inhibited him from releasing his own music.

Following the expiration of his contract with the agency in 2014, Chancellor parted ways with Duble Sidekick to pursue a solo singing career. In 2015, Chancellor competed in the eleventh season of the singing competition series King of Mask Singer, but was eliminated in a 40–59 vote. Under his current stage name, he released his debut single "Son E Ga" on September 8. He signed with Brand New Music the following year and released his debut studio album My Full Name and its lead single "Surrender" with Lyn on November 30, 2016. After signing with Konnect Entertainment two months prior, his self-titled second studio album and the singles "Midnight" and "Runaway with Me" were released on October 13, 2021. The former was included in Billboard magazine's "25 Best K-pop Songs of 2021: Critics' Picks", while Chancellor himself was included in Tidal's list of "K-pop: Artists To Watch in 2022".

== Personal life ==
Chancellor is an American citizen. He began dating singer NS Yoon-G in March 2015 while working on music together. They had met two years prior to the relationship. The couple became estranged due to their conflicting schedules and ended their relationship in August 2017.

On October 21, 2022, Chancellor announced he would marry his non-celebrity girlfriend on October 29.

== Discography ==
=== Albums ===
==== Studio albums ====
Title	Details	Peak chart positions
Title	Details	KOR
My Full Name	Released: November 30, 2016; Label: Brand New Music, Warner Music Korea; Format: CD, digital download	84
Chancellor	Released: October 13, 2021; Label: Konnect, Warner Music Korea; Format: CD, digital download	—

=== Singles ===
==== As lead artist ====
Title	Year	Peak chart positions		Album
Title	Year	KOR		Album
Title	Year	Gaon	Hot	Album
"Loving You (R&B Ver.)"	2013	—	—	Duble Sidekick Project Vol.3
"Son E Ga" (손이 가; Soni Ga) (with Bumkey)	2015	— (Note: "Son E Ga" did not enter the Gaon Digital Chart, but peaked at number 85 on the Gaon Download Chart.)	—	Non-album single
"Better"	2015	—	—	Non-album single
"Dish" (안주거리; Anjugeori) (with San E)	2016	68	—	Non-album single
"Rodeo" (featuring Paloalto)	2016	—	—	Non-album single
"Our Night Is More Beautiful Than Your Days" (우리의 밤은 당신의 낮보다 아름답다; Uri-eui Bameun Dangshin-eui Natboda Areumdapda) (with Yoon Bo-mi (Apink), Kim Nam-joo (Apink), Jung Chae-yeon, LE, Seo In-young, Lee Seok-hoon, Wuno, Yang Da-il, Brother Su, and Kang Min-hee)	2016	89	—	Merry Summer
"Palm Tree" (featuring B-Free)	2016	—	—	Non-album single
"Sunshine" (with Verbal Jint)	2016	—	—	Non-album single
"Murda" (with Dok2)	2016	—	—	Non-album single
"Surrender" (with Lyn)	2016	—	—	My Full Name
"Already Christmas" (어느새 크리스마스; Eoneusae Keuriseumaseu) (with Yang Da-il, Gree, As One, and Kang Min-hee)	2016	—	—	Brandnew Year 2016 'Better Tomorrow'
"Baby Can I" (너가 필요한 것 같아; Neoga Piryohan Geot Gata) (with Bumkey, Sanchez, Taewan, Yang Da-il, MXM)	2017	—	—	Brandnew Year 2017 'Brandnew Season'
"We Own the Night" (with Moti)	2018	—	—	Non-album single
"Angel" (featuring Taeyeon)	2019	— (Note: "Angel" did not enter the Gaon Digital Chart, but peaked at number 40 on the Gaon BGM Chart.)	—	Non-album single
"Walking in the Rain" (with Younha)	2020	— (Note: "Walking in the Rain" did not enter the Gaon Digital Chart, but peaked at number 66 on the Gaon BGM Chart.)	—	Non-album single
"Automatic" (with Babylon, twlv, Moon Su-jin, Bibi, and Jiselle)	2020	—	—	Non-album single
"Automatic Remix" (with Jay Park, Lee Hi, Bibi, Jamie, Moon, Bumkey, Samuel Seo, Suran, Babylon, Hoody, Sumin, MRSHLL, Ann One, Elo, twlv, oceanfromtheblue, Jiselle, Sole, Thama, K.vsh, Jinbo, Jerd, Soovi, B.E.D., Xydo, Owell Mood, and None)	2020	—	—	Non-album single
"Automatic (Hi-Mix)" (with Reddy, and Paloalto)	2020	—	—	Non-album single
"Behind You" (너의 뒤에서; Neoeui Dwieseo)	2021	—	—	Non-album single
"Midnight" (featuring Gaeko)	2021	—	—	Chancellor
"Runaway with Me"	2021	—	—	Chancellor
"Beautiful" (with Johan Kim)	2021	—	—	Non-album single
"Fly" (with Kang Daniel)	2021	— (Note: "Fly" did not enter the Gaon Digital Chart, but peaked at number 25 on the Gaon Download Chart.)	—	Cyworld BGM 2021
"Playlist" (with Lee Hyun-do and Knave)	2022	—	—	D.O.P.E
"Slowly" (천천히; Cheoncheonhi)	2022	—	—	Non-album single

==== As featured artist ====
Title	Year	Album
"Sugar Sugar" (Mighty Mouth featuring Chancellor)	2016	Non-album single
"Virgin Love" (과일; Gwail) (Ovan featuring Chancellor)	2017	Non-album single
"Naked" (P-Type featuring Chancellor)	2017	2 Years Part.1
"On&On" (Lyn featuring Chancellor)	2017	Joue Avec Moi
"Enjoy" (즐겨; Jeulgyeo) (Reddy featuring Chancellor)	2017	Non-album single
"Men'z Night" (P.O featuring Chancellor)	2017	Non-album single
"My Love by My Side" (내사랑 내곁에; Nae Sarang Naegyeote) (Jinbo featuring Chancellor)	2017	Non-album single
"Time to Shine" (Microdot featuring Chancellor)	2017	Prophet
"1llogic" (Dok2 featuring Chancellor)	2018	Non-album single
"Good" (Chin Chilla featuring Chancellor)	2018	#CH.
"Taeyang" (태양) (Gary featuring Chancellor)	2018	2020
"Missed Call" (받지마; Batjima) (Jiselle featuring Chancellor)	2019	Non-album single
"Fame" (인기; Ingi) (MC Mong featuring Song Ga-in and Chancellor)	2019	Channel 8
"Back to the Love" (WetBoy solo) (Wet Video (Always Wetboy & Videoman23) featuring Chancellor)	2021	Third Tape of Wet Video
"Close Up" (Kanto featuring Chancellor)	2021	Non-album single
"Secret Love Remix" (Horim featuring Chancellor, Damo, Brwn, Knave, and Jhnovr)	2021	Non-album single
"Kicks" (Wadi featuring Paloalto and Chancellor)	2023	Non-album single

=== Guest appearances ===
Title	Year	Other performer(s)	Release
"Already One Year" (벌써 일년; Beolsseo Ilnyeon)	2015	Solar (Mamamoo)	King of Mask Singer Episode 21
"Holding the End of This Night" (이 밤의 끝을 잡고; I Bameui Kkeuteul Japko)	2015	—N/a	King of Mask Singer Episode 21
"Symphony"	2015	Ailee	Vivid
"Natural Woman"	2016	Bumkey	U-Turn
"Please Come Back (Soul Ver.)" (기어갈게요; Gieogalgeyo)	2016	Kixs	Non-album single
"One Step Backward" (한 발짝 뒤로; Han Baljjak Dwiro)	2016	Yang Da-il	Say
"Moscato d'Asti"	2017	Reddy	Universe
"In My Car"	2017	Primeboi, TakeOne	Trailer
"History of Violence"	2017	Dumbfoundead	Foreigner
"I Got It" (상상해; Sangsanghae)	2017	Primary, pH-1	Shininryu
"Feel"	2017	Younha	Rescue
"Moonlight"	2018	Justhis & Paloalto	4 the Youth
"Cupid"	2018	Ja Mezz	GOØDevil
"Airplane Mode"	2018	G2, Reddy	Throwing Up Butterflies
"Career High"	2019	Dynamic Duo, Paloalto, Nafla	Off Duty
"Star"	2021	MC Mong, D.Ark	Flower 9
"Ride or Die"	2021	Nafla	Natural High
"Dot (00:59 am)"	2022	Moon Sujin, Jason Lee	Listen-Up EP.3
"Rendezvous"	2023	Soulbysel	Soulbysel Compilation 04

=== Soundtrack appearances ===
Title	Year	Release
"As If I'm Dead" (죽은 듯이 지낼게; Jugeun Deusi Jinaeke) (with Bill Stax)	2015	Mask OST
"At This Time" (이맘 때면; Imam Ttaemyeon) (with Kwon Jin-ah)	2016	Sing for You OST
"Me In" (너란 자연; Neoran Jiyeon) (a.mond featuring Chancellor)	2018	Top Management OST
"Way"	2021	At a Distance, Spring Is Green OST
"Because of You"	2022	Rookie Cops OST

== Filmography ==
Television series
Title	Year	Role	Ref.
King of Mask Singer	2015	Contestant	
