= Show Me the Money 4 =

- Season 4
- Hosted by: Kim Jin-pyo (김진표); DJ DaQ (Resident DJ)
- Judges: Team YG: Tablo; Jinusean; Team AOMG: Jay Park; Loco; Team Brand New Music: Verbal Jint; San E Team ZiPal: Zico; Paloalto
- Winner: Basick
- Runner-up: MINO

Release
- Original network: Mnet
- Original release: June 26 – August 28, 2015

Season chronology
- ← Previous; Show Me the Money 3 Next → Show Me the Money 5

The fourth season of Show Me the Money (SMTM) premiered on June 26, 2015, airing every Friday evening on Mnet, and ended with its last episode aired on August 28, 2015.

Mnet's fourth season of SMTM features YG judges Jinusean and Tablo, San E and Verbal Jint from Brand New Music, AOMG judges Jay Park and Loco, and judges Paloalto of Hi-Lite Records and Zico. Over 7,000 contestants auditioned this year with more idol rappers, veterans, and women participating in the competition. Snoop Dogg also appeared as a special guest judge during the guerrilla mission. The winner of the season was Basick, with Song Min-ho as runner up.

== Judges ==
=== Team YG ===
- Tablo: Rapper, producer, and songwriter of Epik High
- Jinusean: Hiphop duo composed of Jinu (Kim Jin-woo) and Sean (Noh Seung-hwan).

=== Team AOMG ===
- Jay Park: CEO of AOMG and H1gher Music, rapper and singer
- Loco: Rapper that won SMTM1

=== Team Brand New Music ===
- Verbal Jint: Returning judge from SMTM1, and an influential rapper and lyricist
- San E: Hip-hop rapper; judged SMTM3 and was a host of Unpretty Rapstar

=== Team ZiPal ===
- Zico: Leader of Block B who has achieved mainstream success while maintaining his reputation in the underground hip-hop scene
- Paloalto: Heads Hi-Lite Records and is part of the underground Korean hip-hop scene

== Teams ==
=== Team YG ===
- Newchamp : Rapper signed under PJR Entertainment. Tried out for SMTM3 but returned for this season
- Incredivle : Rapper that was featured on a track with Block B sub-unit, BASTARZ. Signed under YG Entertainment's Sub-Company HIGHGRND after the show ended.
- Superbee : Participated in all previous seasons of SMTM, but never made it past the first round until SMTM4
- Innovator : Veteran rapper, previously signed to defunct label Independent Records. Previously a member of Jiggy Fellaz with Basick as a part of Double Trouble

=== Team AOMG ===
- Geegooin : member of Rhythm Power, managed under Amoeba Culture
- Lil Boi : Geeks member, managed under Grandline Entertainment and Rainbow Bridge World. Member of Buckwilds crew. He is also the Winner of Show Me the Money 9.
- Sik-K : member of Yellows mob. Previously signed under Grandline Entertainment, now under H1GHR MUSIC.
- David Kim : producer/songwriter and formerly known as DayDay of boy band DMTN (Dalmatian)

=== Team ZiPal ===
- One : Leader and rapper of 1Punch, managed under Brave Entertainment, signed with YG as a solo artist after the show ended.
- MINO : Main rapper of Winner, managed under YG
- AndUp : Member of Buckwilds and Do'main crews
- Ja Mezz : Participated in SMTM3, SMTM4 and returned for SMTM6, managed under Grandline Entertainment

=== Team Brand New ===
- Black Nut : managed under JustMusic Entertainment
- Basick : Veteran rapper, previously a member of hip hop crew Jiggy Fellaz and duo Double Trouble with Innovator. Now signed with Rainbow Bridge World.
- Microdot : Veteran rapper, former member of hip-hop duo ALL BLACK with Dok2
- Hanhae : Phantom member, managed under Brand New Music and Rainbow Bridge World

== Rounds ==
- Round One: Open Auditions - A random judge listens to a cappella rap. The rapper passes to the next round if he/she receives a SMTM necklace from the judge.
- Round Two: One Minute Rap - Rappers have one minute to rap to a beat of their choice for an entire minute in front of all the judges. At least one judge must pass the rapper in order for the rapper to move on to the next round. However, if all four teams fail the rapper, the rapper is eliminated from the competition.
- Round Three: Rap Battle - Rappers are randomly selected one by one to choose an opponent for a 1v1 rap battle. The rappers are given time to choose a beat and prepare for the battle before they perform it in front of the judges. The judges will then choose one rapper to move on to the next round; the other rapper is eliminated.
  - Revival Round - Four rappers are chosen from the losers of the previous round and must compete in another 1v1 rap battle. Two rappers are chosen from the four to move on to the next round.
- Round Four: Guerrilla "Cypher" Mission - All of the rappers must participate in a cypher and four of them are eliminated. Snoop Dogg was the guest judge for this round. The rest are part of the Top 24.
- Round Five: Team Choosing - All of the judges put on a performance for the Top 24; the team with the most votes from the contestants gets to choose four rappers to be a part of their team. After that, the remaining twenty rappers choose which team they want to be a part of; if a team has less than four rappers in the room, the team is automatically eliminated. If there are more than four rappers in the team room, the judges of that team must eliminate the excess amount of rappers down to four rappers.
- Round Six: Official Song Mission - Each team puts on a performance for all of the judges and then one rapper from each team is eliminated.
- Round Seven: Team Diss Battle - Two teams are pitted against each other and the losing team has to eliminate one rapper. All three rappers from the winning team advance to the next round.
- Round Eight: Live Performances - The first place rapper within each team(chosen by each of the producer teams) gets to have a live solo performance. Based on the money earned during the performances, the contestant with less money earned would be sent home(if the contestant was the last of his producer's team, the team cannot participate in the battles any longer).
- Round Nine: Live Performances - The winners of the previous round were put together based on the producers' choices. Whoever earned the least amount of money would be sent home.
- Final Round: Live Performances - The finalists get to have a final performance to determine the winner(based on how much money is earned).

== Finals ==
=== Top 12 ===
- Team YG: Incredivle, Superbee, Innovator
- Team AOMG: Geegooin, Lill Boi, Sik-K
- Team ZiPal: MINO, AndUp, Ja Mezz
- Team Brand New: Basick, Microdot, Hanhae

=== Top 10 ===
- Team YG: Incredivle, Superbee, Innovator
- Team AOMG: Geegooin, Lil Boi
- Team ZiPal: MINO, AndUp
- Team Brand New: Basick, Microdot, Black Nut (Black Nut was brought back in Hanhae's place after the judges believed they made a mistake eliminating him in favor of Hanhae.)

=== Top 6 ===
- Team YG: Incredivle, Innovator
- Team AOMG: Lil Boi
- Team ZiPal: MINO
- Team Brand New: Basick, Black Nut

=== Semi-finalists ===
- Team Brand New: Basick
- Team YG: Innovator
- Team Brand New: Black Nut
- Team ZiPal: MINO

=== Finalists ===
- Team Brand New: Basick
- Team ZiPal: MINO

=== Winner ===
- Team Brand New: Basick

== Notable Contestants ==
- P-Type - The rap teacher of CL, signed under Brand New Music, and one of the most influential figures in Korean hip-hop. Shockingly eliminated during the second round.
- Crucial Star - South Korean rapper and producer, he did not go through the preliminary round after forgetting his lyrics. He asked for a second chance at the end of the round but he was denied by Tablo who told him it would not be fair to give him a second chance while everyone else only had one.
- Kim Min-jae - Rookie actor at the time he got to the show. Eliminated during the second round.
- Jooheon of Monsta X - Eliminated during the third round; got one special chance on Revival Round but eventually lost against One.
- Vernon of Seventeen - Caused controversy for barely passing the second round when other rappers that were more experienced than him were eliminated. Eliminated in the third round against AndUp.
- Taewoon - Zico's older brother and the former leader of SPEED; now a solo rapper under Doublekick Entertainment. He was part of the Top 24 but was not chosen to be part of Top 16.
- Ravi of VIXX - Eliminated in the second round
- Yano and Kidoh from Topp Dogg - Were both eliminated during the second round.
- Kasper - Former member of the hip-hop group Play the Siren and Kisum's friend (a rapper who appeared on Show Me the Money 3), she was eliminated during the second round.
- Yaebin of Hinapia (Previously of Pristin) - Eliminated in the second round
- Park Jiyeon, former member and leader of k-pop girl group Glam co-managed by Big Hit Entertainment and Source Music, auditioned for SMTM4 but failed to pass. She is now a soloist under KQ Entertainment with the stage name Lucy.
- Sik-K, member of Yellows Mob, currently signed to H1gher Music.
