= The Boy Who Cried Wolf (San E album) =

Studio album by San E
- Released: April 23, 2015
- Genre: Hip-hop
- Length: 41:33
- Language: Korean
- Label: Brand New Music

San E chronology
'Not' Based on the True Story (2013)	The Boy Who Cried Wolf (2015)	Season of Suffering (2017)

The Boy Who Cried Wolf (Korean: 양치기 소년; RR: Yangchigi sonyeon) is the first studio album of South Korean rapper San E. It was released on April 23, 2015, by Brand New Music.

== Background ==
Although San E had high expectations as a rapper, his previous albums Everybody Ready? and 'Not' Based on the True Story received negative reviews. In order to protect his reputation in the hip-hop scene, he announced that his studio album would prove that he is a great rapper in a track.

B-Free dissed San E in his track "My Team", which made San E diss him back in "On Top of Your Head".

== Music and lyrics ==
San E disses B-Free in "On Top of Your Head" on a Southern hip hop trap beat.

== Critical reception ==
Professional ratings
Review scores
Source	Rating
IZM	2/5 stars
Rhythmer	2/5 stars

Kim Doheon of IZM rated The Boy Who Cried Wolf 2 out of 5 stars.

Nam Seong-hun of Rhythmer also rated the album 2 out of 5 stars.

== Track listing ==
No.	Title	Length
1.	"#LuvUHater"	3:29
2.	"She's" (featuring Jung In)	3:37
3.	"On Top of Your Head" (모두가 내 발 아래; Moduga nae bal arae) (featuring MC Gree)	4:06
4.	"Using You" (featuring Joe Rhee)	4:18
5.	"I Deserve It" (featuring Jessi, illinit and i11even)	3:55
6.	"Feeling Good Now" (featuring YDG and Don Mills)	3:49
7.	"Me You" (featuring Baek Yerin)	3:29
8.	"$$o Dope" (featuring Bill Stax and C Jamm)	3:50
9.	"Road to Success" (성공하고 싶었어; Seonggonghago sipeosseo)	4:02
10.	"#LuvUHater" (instrumental)	3:29
11.	"Me You" (instrumental)	3:29
Total length:		41:33

== Charts ==
Chart (2015)	Peak position
South Korean Albums (Gaon)	17

== Sales ==
Region	Sales
South Korea	1,816
