= Innovator (rapper) =

South Korean rapper

Innovator 홍인호
- Born: Hong In-ho; October 10, 1988 (age 38); South Korea
- Genre: Hip hop
- Occupation: Rapper
- Instrument: Vocals
- Years active: 2007–present

- Innovator
- Hangul: 홍인호
- RR: Hong Inho
- MR: Hong Inho

Hong In-ho (Korean: 홍인호, born October 10, 1988), better known by his stage name Innovator (이노베이터), is a South Korean rapper. He was a contestant on Show Me the Money 4. He released his first album, Time Travel, on October 8, 2007.

== Discography ==
=== Studio albums ===
Title	Album details
Time Travel	Released: October 8, 2007; Label: Orifeel Sound; Formats: CD, digital download

=== Singles ===
Title	Year	Peak chart positions	Sales (DL)	Album
Title	Year	KOR	Sales (DL)	Album
As lead artist
"Top" (팽이) feat. C Jamm	2014	—	—N/a	Non-album singles
"Hip Hop" feat. Venus	2014	—	—N/a	Non-album singles
"More Than a TV Star" feat. Lee Hi	2015	47	KOR: 104,797	Show Me the Money 4
"I Remember" feat. Esna	2016	—	—N/a	Non-album singles
"Pink Funk" feat. Basick	2016	—	—N/a	Non-album singles
Collaborations
"Amper 4" with Sool J, Tarae, Ggan Mo, Deepflow, Illinit, DJ It	2012	—	—N/a	Non-album single
"OG (Be Original)" with Incredivle, Superbee	2015	91	KOR: 37,564	Show Me the Money 4
"IiF" with Scary'P feat. DJ Tiz	2015	—	—N/a	Non-album single
"—" denotes releases that did not chart.
