= Hanhae =

South Korean rapper (born 1990)

- 정한해
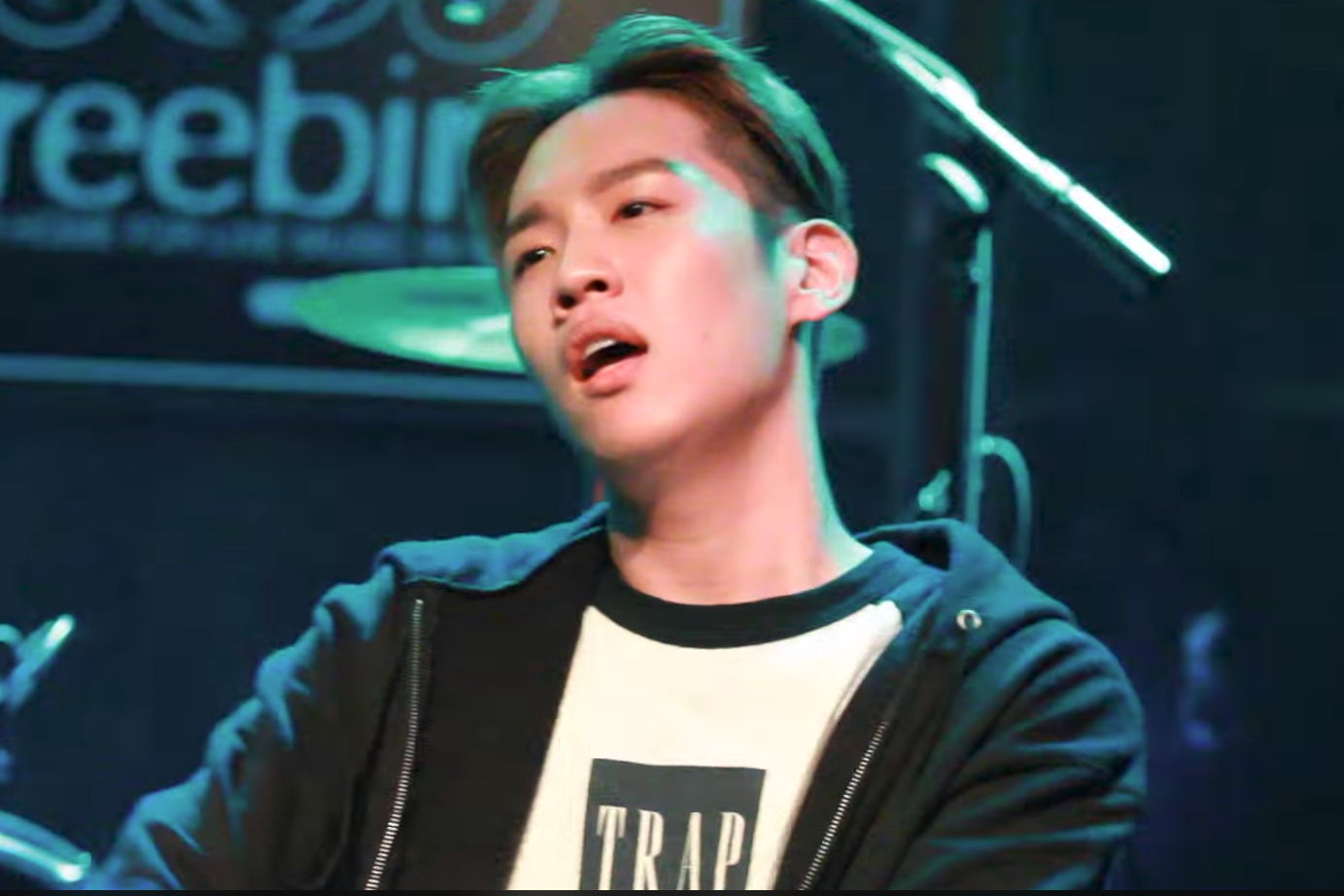
- Born: Jung Han-hae; April 7, 1990 (age 36); Busan, South Korea
- Occupations: Rapper; singer
- Musical career
- Genres: Hip hop
- Instrument: Vocals
- Years active: 2011–present
- Label: Brand New Music
- Formerly of: Phantom

Korean name
- Hangul: 정한해
- RR: Jeong Hanhae
- MR: Chŏng Hanhae

Jung Han-hae (Korean: 정한해; born April 7, 1990), better known by the mononym Hanhae, is a South Korean rapper and singer. He is a former member of the hip hop boy band Phantom.

== Discography ==
=== Studio albums ===
Title	Album details	Peak chart positions	Sales
Title	Album details	KOR	Sales
365	Released: January 30, 2015; Label: Brand New Music; Formats: CD, digital download	5	KOR: 1,761

=== Extended plays ===
Title	Album details
Organic Life	Released: March 22, 2018; Label: Brand New Music; Formats: digital download
About Time	Released: February 8, 2019; Label: Brand New Music; Formats: digital download

=== Singles ===
Title	Year	Peak chart positions	Sales	Album
Title	Year	KOR	Sales	Album
"Inconvenient Truth" (불편한 진실) (with Lee Ji-young of Big Mama)	2013	70	KOR: 64,144	Non-album singles
"Let's Quit" (끊어줄래) (feat. San E and Taewan)	2014	35	KOR: 95,310	Non-album singles
"Man Of The Year" (올해의 남자) (feat. D.meanor)	2015	—	KOR: 12,828	365
"Don't Put Me On A Cloud" (구름) (feat. Bumkey)	2015	65	KOR: 49,104	Non-album singles
"I Used To" (내가 이래)	2016	67	KOR: 37,407	Non-album singles
"I Know" (나도 알아) (with Candle)	2016	— (Note: "I Know" did not enter the Circle Digital Chart, but it peaked at number 80 on the component Download Chart.)	KOR: 20,526	Non-album singles
"No Meaning" 의미없다) (with Yoon Jong-shin and KittiB)	2016	—		Non-album singles
"Eyescream" (여름, 아이스크림) (feat. Jung Eun-ji)	2016	56	KOR: 36,927	Non-album singles
"Lipstick On My Body" (Lipstick On My 여기저기) (with Henney)	2017	—		Non-album singles
"Airplane" (에어플레인) (with Kanto)	2017	—		Non-album singles
"1/N" (N분의 1) (with Ryno, Nucksal and Jo Woo-chan, feat. Dynamic Duo)	2017	3	KOR: 756,771	Show Me the Money 6
"Gather At The Lobby" (로비로 모여) (feat. Dynamic Duo, Chungha and Muzie)	2017	25	KOR: 109,704	Show Me the Money 6
"One Sun" (feat. Shin Yong-jae and Gaeko)	2017	98	KOR: 42,628	Show Me the Money 6
"Eyes" (보는 눈) (feat. Hani)	2017	— (Note: "Eyes" did not enter the Circle Digital Chart, but it peaked at number 79 on the component Download Chart.)	KOR: 15,011	Organic Life
"More than I Can Bear" (몫)	2018	—		Organic Life
"In My Dream" (나오네 네가) (feat. Gaeko)	2018	—		Organic Life
"Clip Clop" (feat. Dope'Doug)	2018	—		About Time
"I Go" (아이구)	2019	—		About Time
"Mask Christmas" (with Yodayoung)	2020	—		Non-album singles
"Sick"	2020	—		Non-album singles
"Syncopation" (한해 형 특유의 앞 박자) (feat. Killagramz)	2021	—		Non-album singles
"Good Morning" (굿모닝) (with Verbal Jint, feat. Wonstein)	2021	— (Note: "Good Morning" did not enter the Circle Digital Chart, but it peaked at number 45 on the component Download Chart.)		Non-album singles
"Lay Back" (뒷 박자) (feat. Nucksal and Layone)	2021	—		Non-album singles
"Pop Song" (with NIve)	2021	—		Non-album singles
"Evergreen" (with Lee Hae-ri)	2024	— (Note: "Evergreen" did not enter the Circle Digital Chart, but it peaked at number 13 on the component Download Chart.)		Non-album singles
"Champagne" (샴페인)	2024	—		Non-album singles
"Teach Me" (가르쳐줘) (with Moon Se-yoon)	2025	— (Note: "Teach Me" did not enter the Circle Digital Chart, but it peaked at number 36 on the component Download Chart.)		Non-album singles
"Already a Year" (벌써 일년) (with Moon Se-yoon)	2025	— (Note: "Already a Year" did not enter the Circle Digital Chart, but it peaked at number 26 on the component Download Chart.)		Non-album singles
"Stay With Me" (그대로 있어주면 돼) (with Moon Se-yoon, feat. As One)	2025	— (Note: "Stay With Me" did not enter the Circle Digital Chart, but it peaked at number 35 on the component Download Chart.)		Non-album singles
"—" denotes releases that did not chart.

=== Other charted songs ===
Title	Year	Peak chart positions	Album
Title	Year	KOR	Album
"Let's Not Meet Again" (마주치지 말자) (Mose feat. Hanhae)	2014	63	Non-album single
"Playback" (다시보기) (Kiggen feat. Hanhae and Jinsil of Mad Soul Child)	2015	92	Song For The Night
"Listen Up" (함부로 해줘) (Yezi feat. Hanhae)	2015	27	Unpretty Rapstar 2 Compilation
"Even For 1 Minute" (1분만이라도) (As One feat. Hanhae)	2015	16	Non-album singles
"This Christmas" (Lee Moon-sae and Roy Kim, feat. Hanhae)	2015	79	Non-album singles

=== Soundtrack appearances ===
Title	Year	Album
"Stay Weird, Stay Different" (이상하자) (with Raina, feat. Verbal Jint)	2015	Stay Weird, Stay Different OST
"Why Do You" (너는 왜) (with Jessi, feat. DJ Juice)	2016	Two Yoo Project Sugar Man OST
"Far Away" (멀리서) (with Jang Jae-in)	2017	Queen of Mystery OST
"To Tell the Truth" (사실은) (with Yang Da-il)	2018	Luv Pub OST
"LOVE" (with Lyn)	2018	Are You Human? OST
"Shadow" (그림자) (with Kissxs)	2022	Again My Life OST
"Just Like Now" (지금 이대로) (with Eunjong)	2022	Single's Inferno 2 OST
"Seunggi" (승기) (feat. Jasmine Choi)	2023	Infinite Borders OST

== Filmography ==
=== Television shows ===
Year	Title	Role	Ref.
2015	Show Me the Money 4	Contestant	
2016	Tribe of Hip Hop	Producer	
2017	Show Me the Money 6	Contestant	
2022	Pet Me Pick Me	Host	
2024	Make Mate 1	Rap Trainer	
2024	Starlight Boys	Guider	

=== Web shows ===
Year	Title	Role	Notes	Ref.
2021	After School Excitement	Trainer		
2021–2023	Single's Inferno	Host	Season 1–2	
2022	The Door: To Wonderland	Cast Member	Season 1–2	

=== Radio shows ===
Year	Title	Role	Ref.
2025	Kiss the Radio	DJ	

== Awards and nominations ==
Name of the award ceremony, year presented, category, nominee of the award, and the result of the nomination
Award ceremony	Year	Category	Nominee / Work	Result	Ref.
Blue Dragon Series Awards	2022	Best New Male Entertainer	Single's Inferno	Nominated	
