= A Midsummer Night's Sweetness =

Single by San E & Raina
- Released: June 12, 2014
- Recorded: 2014
- Genre: K-pop, rap
- Length: 3:53
- Label: Pledis Entertainment, Brand New
- Songwriters: San E, Cosmic Sound

Music video
- "A Midsummer Night's Sweetness" on YouTube

"A Midsummer Night's Sweetness" (Korean: 한여름밤의 꿀; RR: Hanyeoreumbamui Kkul) is a song by rapper San E and After School's Raina. It was released on June 12, 2014.

== Promotions ==
San E and Raina had their first live stage on Mnet's M! Countdown on June 12, 2014, followed by MBC's Music Core on June 14, 2014.

== Chart performance ==
After its release on the June 12, "A Midsummer Night's Sweetness" achieved number 1 on all ten major music charts, including Olleh, Bugs, Daum, Naver, Soribada, Genie, Mnet, monkey3, Cyworld, and MelOn.

The song debuted at number 6 on the weekly Gaon Digital Chart, and the following week it rose three spots to number 3. For the week of June 22–28 the song charted at number 1. For the month of July the song charted at number 1 on the monthly Gaon Digital Chart.

== Track listing ==
No.	Title	Lyrics	Music	Length
1.	"A Midsummer Night's Sweetness"	San E	San E, Cosmic Sound	3:53
2.	"A Midsummer Night's Sweetness (Inst.)"	San E	San E, Cosmic Sound	3:53
Total length:				7:46

== Charts ==
Chart	Peak position
Gaon Digital Chart (weekly)	1
Gaon Digital Chart (monthly)	1
Gaon Mobile Chart	1
Gaon Karaoke Chart	4

== Credits and personnel ==
- Raina – vocals
- San E – rap
