= Lee Jae-woong =

Lee Jae-woong may refer to:

- Lee Jae-woong (singer), South Korean singer with Troy
- Lee Jae-woong (sledge hockey) (born 1996), South Korean sledge hockey player
