= Basick =

South Korean rapper (born 1986)

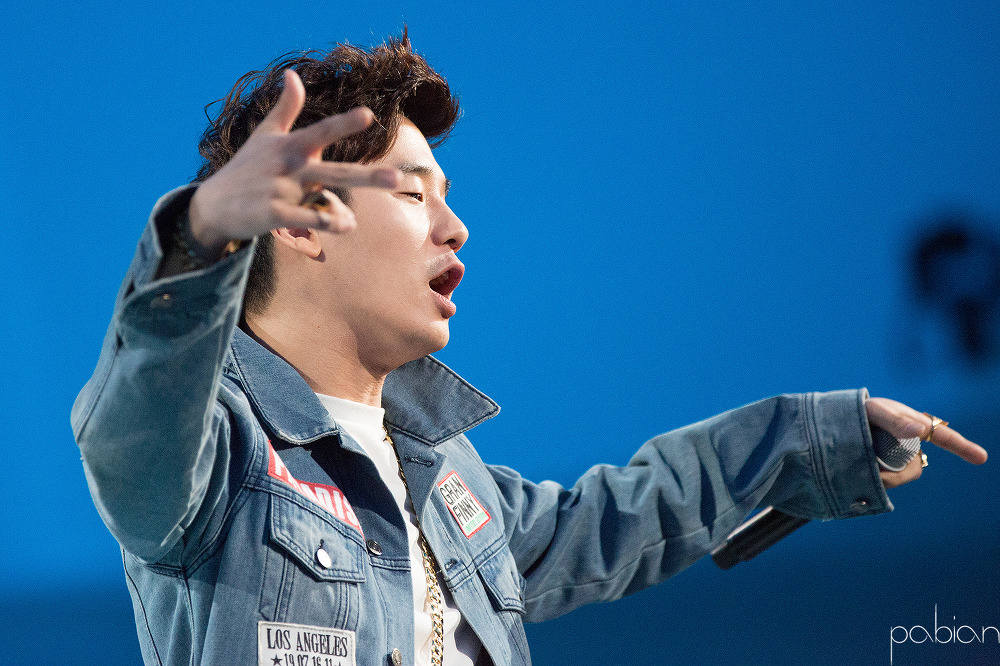
- Basick in 2016

Background information
- Born: Lee Cheol-joo (이철주); August 12, 1986 (age 39); Daegu, South Korea
- Genres: Korean hip hop
- Occupation: Rapper
- Instrument: Voice
- Years active: 2007–present
- Labels: RBW (2015–2018), OUTLIVE
- Website: rbbridge.com

Lee Cheol-joo (Korean: 이철주; born 12 August 1986), better known by his stage name Basick (베이식), is a South Korean rapper under OUTLIVE. He won the fourth season of Mnet's rap competition Show Me the Money.

== Biography ==
Basick was born on August 12, 1986, in Daegu, South Korea. He is fluent in English, having majored in marketing at Babson College in the United States. Basick is married to Yoo Seo-yeon and they welcomed their first child, Lee Chaeha, in 2015.

== Career ==
Basick first appeared in the Korean underground hip hop scene in 2007 and was recruited as a member of South Korea's largest hip hop crew Jiggy Fellaz in 2008. In 2009, Basick became one half of the duo Double Trouble with fellow Jiggy Fellaz crew member, Innovator. Mid-2013, he began a hiatus in the music scene after getting married and started a career inside a sports fashion brand.

In 2015, Basick participated in the fourth season of rap competition Show Me the Money, going on to win the series overall as part of team "Brand New" with Verbal Jint and San E of Brand New Music. Basick is now signed under Rainbow Bridge World and have featured in a number of collaborations. In 2016, he released his first mini album titled Nice.

== Discography ==
=== Studio albums ===
Title	Album details	Peak chart positions	Sales
Title	Album details	KOR	Sales
Classick	Released: September 27, 2011; Label: Classick; Formats: CD, digital download	—	
Foundation Vol. 3	Released: April 19, 2013; Label: Genuine Music; Formats: CD, digital download	—	
Foundation Vol. 4	Released: April 5, 2018; Label: Rainbow Bridge World; Formats: CD, digital download	97	

=== Extended plays ===
Title	Album details	Peak chart positions	Sales
Title	Album details	KOR	Sales
Therapy	Released: November 1, 2013; Label: Genuine Music; Formats: CD, digital download	—	
Nice	Released: August 2, 2016; Label: Rainbow Bridge World; Formats: CD, digital download	42	
whatiwant	Released: April 5, 2019; Label: Outlive; Formats: CD, digital download	—	
Soft	Released: November 29, 2019; Label: Outlive; Formats: CD, digital download	—	

=== Singles ===
Title	Year	Peak chart positions	Sales (DL)	Album
Title	Year	KOR	Sales (DL)	Album
As lead artist
"Better Than The Best"	2008	—		Non-album singles
"Champion Pt.ll" (feat. Rocky L and Jtong)	2010	—		Non-album singles
"Basement"	2011	—		Classick
"You Already Know"	2012	—		Foundation Vol. 3
"Pretty Girls" (feat. Kim Sae Han Gil)	2012	—		Foundation Vol. 3
"Don't Stop"	2012	—		Foundation Vol. 3
"Boss"	2012	—		Foundation Vol. 3
"Kimchi" (김치)	2013	—		Foundation Vol. 3
"Nice Life" (feat. Paloalto)	2013	—		Therapy
"Therapy" (feat. C Jamm and Innovator)	2013	—		Therapy
"Gxnzi" (feat. Vasco)	2015	39	KOR: 117,038	Show Me the Money 4
"Stand Up" (feat. Mamamoo)	2015	21	KOR: 255,492	Show Me the Money 4
"Better Days" (좋은 날) (feat. Gummy)	2015	26	KOR: 182,172	Show Me the Money 4
"In Front of the House" (그 집 앞) (feat. Kim Jin-ho)	2016	67	KOR: 30,440	Non-album single
"Nice" (feat. G2 and Hwasa)	2016	— (Note: "Nice" did not enter the Gaon Digital Chart, but it peaked at number 64 on the component Gaon Download Chart.)	KOR: 18,274	Nice
"Is That Why" (그래서 그런가) (feat. B.O.)	2016	—		Non-album singles
"My Wave" (feat. Sik-K)	2017	—		Non-album singles
"Pinocchio" (피노키오) (feat. Verbal Jint)	2017	—		Non-album singles
"₩on It All" (feat. Most Badass Asian)	2017	—		Non-album singles
"A Woman I Know" (아는 여자) (feat. San E)	2017	—		Non-album singles
"Real Life" (feat. The Quiett)	2017	—		Foundation Vol. 4
"Starter"	2017	—		Foundation Vol. 4
"SM58" (feat. Justhis)	2018	—		Foundation Vol. 4
"Microphone Checker (MC)" (feat. Koonta and Paloalto)	2018	—		Foundation Vol. 4
"The Kid"	2018	—		Foundation Vol. 4
"Home" (feat. Jang Jae-in and Hash Swan)	2018	—		Non-album single
"Manbogi" (만보기) (feat. Mckdaddy)	2019	—		whatiwant
"me" (feat. EK)	2019	—		whatiwant
"Calluses" (굳은살) (feat. Life of Hojj)	2019	—		Non-album singles
"Honestly" (솔직히) (feat. Sleepy)	2019	—		Non-album singles
"Choco" (초코) (feat. The Deep)	2019	—		Soft
"Fucked" (촛됐다 (가짜사나이))	2020	—		Non-album singles
"My Song" (내 노래)	2020	—		Non-album singles
"Naked"	2020	—		Non-album singles
"When It Snows mmm" (눈이 오면 mmm) (feat. Wheein)	2020	—		Non-album singles
"Meeting Is Easy, Parting Is Hard" (만남은 쉽고 이별은 어려워) (feat. Leellamarz)	2021	3		Show Me the Money 10
"08Basick" (08베이식) (feat. Yumdda and Punchnello)	2021	22		Show Me the Money 10
Collaborations
"Miss Pretty" (with Kim Sae Han Gil)	2011	—		Non-album single
"My Zone" (with Blacknut and Microdot feat. San E and Verbal Jint)	2015	12	KOR: 288,194	Show Me the Money 4
"I'm The Man" (with Verbal Jint and San E)	2015	97	KOR: 38,267	Show Me the Money 4
"Call Me" (연락해) (with Lil Boi, feat. Hwasa)	2015	26	KOR: 105,060	Non-album singles
"All Right" (with Big Tray, Marvel J, and B.O.)	2017	—		Non-album singles
"See You In Heaven" (별똥별) (with Kassy)	2017	—		Non-album singles
"Layoff" (정리해고) (with Gwangil Jo)	2019	—		Non-album singles
"More Than Ever" (with MAN1AC and Ann One)	2020	—		Non-album singles
"Memories of You and Me" (너와 나의 Memories) (with Yumdda, Song Min Young, Ji Sang, 365LIT, Koonta, and TOIL)	2021	9		Show Me the Money 10
"A Long Day" (고생이 많아) (with Anandelight, Mudd the Student, and Sokodomo)	2021	169		Show Me the Money 10
Soundtrack appearances
"In the Illusion" (환상 속의 그대)	2016	—		W OST
"Together" (with Jung Chae-yeon, Seunghee, and Janey)	2016	—		Eat Sleep Eat OST
"Destiny" (운명처럼) (with Park Bo-ram)	2017	—		Man to Man OST
"Let Me Hear It" (들려줘) (with Kang Ji-won)	2019	—		Confession OST
"—" denotes releases that did not chart.

== Filmography ==
=== Television ===
Year	Network	Title	Notes
2015	Mnet	Show Me the Money 4	Winner
2016	JTBC	Hip Hop Nation Season 2	Cast member
2021	Mnet	Show Me the Money 10	Contestant
