= Miss S =

South Korean hip-hop duo

Miss $
- Origin: Seoul, South Korea
- Genres: Rap; hip hop; R&B
- Years active: 2008–present
- Label: Brand New Music
- Members: Jace; Minhee
- Past members: Yumi; Hyeyoung
- Website: www.brandnewmusic.co.kr/artist/miss/

Miss S (Hangul: 미스에스; stylized as Miss $) is a South Korean Hip hop duo formed by Brand New Stardom (formerly a joint venture between Stardom Entertainment and Brand New Music). They debuted on November 18, 2008 with the single "Don't Cheat".

== Members ==
=== Current ===
- Jace (Hangul: 제이스)
- Kang Min-hee (강민희)

=== Former ===
- Oh Yu-mi (오유미)
- Tae Hye-young (태혜영)

== Discography ==
=== Studio albums ===
Title	Album details	Peak chart positions	Sales
Title	Album details	KOR	Sales
Miss $ S Class	Released: August 26, 2009; Label: Brand New Stardom, Music & NEW; Formats: CD, digital download; Track listing: 1. S Class intro 2. What Is Love (사랑이 뭐길래); 3. Well When It… (있을 때 잘 해); 4. At The Same Time We (같은 시간 다른 우리) feat. Rhymer; 5. Sudden Goodbye (어느새 안녕); 6. Don't Cheat (바람피지마) feat. Nam Gyu-ri; 7. You're Special (넌 특별해); 8. You Can't Hide (숨길 수 없어); 9. Got Something (뭔가 있어); 10. You Were Not The…(니가 아니 었기를) narr. Rhymer; 11. What Is Love (사랑이 뭐길래) vocal ver 12. S Class full ver feat. Amen & Bizniz	—	—N/a
Miss Terious	Released: November 22, 2011; Label: Brand New Music, LOEN Entertainment; Formats: CD, digital download; Track listing: 1. What Did You Think This Was (너 따위가 뭐라고) feat. Jeong Seul-gi; 2. Understandably (오죽하면 이럴까) feat. Jeong Seul-gi & Im Da-hye; 3. Scent Of A Woman (여인의 향기) feat. Taeil & Im Da-hye; 4. Come (왜 이래) feat. Jeong Seul-gi & Im Da-hye; 5. Who's Done (날 버린게 누군데) feat. Jeong Seul-gi; 6. Over feat. Song Ji-eun; 7. It's Not Over feat. Block B 8. Promise U feat. Jeong Seul-gi	49	—N/a

=== Extended plays ===
Title	Album details	Peak chart positions	Sales
Title	Album details	KOR	Sales
Miss uS?	Released: October 25, 2012; Label: Brand New Music, NHN Entertainment; Formats: CD, digital download; Track listing: 1. Body And Mind (몸인지 맘인지); 2. Good Night (안자고 뭐해); 3. You're Not The Man (니 남자가 아니야); 4. Give Me My Phone Back (내 전화 좀 뺏어줘) feat. Heo In-chang & Kanto; 5. Reduce Some Cigarettes (담배 좀 줄여)	—	—N/a
Lo$t & Found	Released: July 19, 2013; Label: Brand New Music, NHN Entertainment; Formats: CD, digital download; Track listing: 1. You Were Not The… (니가 아니 었기를) narr. Verbal Jint; 2. Scent Of A Woman (여인의 향기); 3. Ladies' Night feat. Kanto	—	—N/a

=== Single albums ===
Title	Album details	Peak chart positions	Sales
Title	Album details	KOR	Sales
Miss $ Diary	Released: November 18, 2008; Label: Brand New Stardom, De Passion; Formats: CD, digital download; Track listing: 1. Don't Cheat (바람피지마) feat. Nam Gyu-ri; 2. Got Something (뭔가 있어); 3. You're Not (니가 아니였기를…) narr. Rhymer	—	—N/a
Miss Independent	Released: September 10, 2010; Label: Brand New Stardom, LOEN Entertainment; Formats: digital download; Track listing: 1. What Did You Eat at This Age? (이 나이 목고 뭐했길래) feat. Jeong Seul-gi; 2. Love Shot feat. Skull; 3. Over feat. Song Ji-eun	—	—N/a
Pro. Miss. U	Released: October 22, 2010; Label: Brand New Stardom, LOEN Entertainment; Formats: digital download; Track listing: 1. Promise U feat. Jeong Seul-gi; 2. What Did You Eat at This Age? (이 나이 목고 뭐했길래) feat. Jeong Seul-gi; 3. Love Shot feat. Skull; 4. Over feat. Song Ji-eun; 5. It's Not Over feat. Block B	43	—N/a

=== Singles ===
Title	Year	Peak chart positions	Sales	Album
Title	Year	KOR	Sales	Album
As lead artist
"Don't Cheat" (바람피지마) feat. Nam Gyu-ri	2008	—	—N/a	Miss $ S Class
What Is Love (사랑이 뭐길래)	2009	—	—N/a	Miss $ S Class
"Older and None The Wiser" (이 나이 목고 뭐했길래) feat. Jeong Seul-gi	2010	5	—N/a	Pro. Miss. U
"Promise U" feat. Jeong Seul-gi	2010	23	—N/a	Miss Terious
"Understandably" (오죽하면 이럴까) feat. Jeong Seul-gi & Im Da-hye	2011	12	KOR: 686,212	Miss Terious
"Reduce Some Cigarettes" (담배 좀 줄여)	2012	21	KOR: 468,457+	Miss uS?
"Good Night" (안자고 뭐해)	2012	38	KOR: 335,960+	Miss uS?
"You Were Not The…" (니가 아니 었기를) narr. Verbal Jint	2013	14	KOR: 246,151+	Lo$t & Found
"Just Let Me Live" (나도 좀 살자) feat. Skull	2013	26	KOR: 88,466+	Non-album singles
"Don’t Speak Without Soul" (영혼없이 말하지마)	2016	66	KOR: 32,189+	Non-album singles
"Featuring" (피처링)	2016	—	—N/a	Non-album singles
Collaborations
"It's Gonna Be Alright" (솧을거야) with As One	2013	19	KOR: 178,871+	Non-album single
As featured artist
"I Know My Heart" (내 맘을 아냐고) MJ feat. Kim Hyun-joong, Miss $ & Uju	2009	20	—N/a	Non-album singles
"Do You Remember?" (잘있니) BNR feat. Wax, Miss $ & Si-jin	2014	—	—N/a	Non-album singles
Soundtrack appearances
"Descend from the Sky" (하늘에서 내려와) feat. Oh Won-bin	2009	—	—N/a	You're Beautiful OST
"—" denotes releases that did not chart.
