= Verbal Jint =

South Korean musician (born 1980)

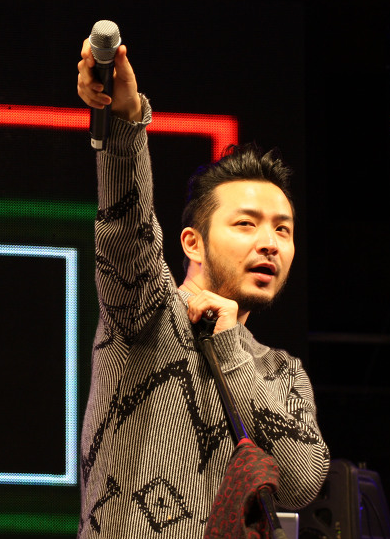
- Verbal Jint in October 2014

Background information
- Born: Kim Jin-tae; December 19, 1980 (age 45); Seoul, South Korea
- Genres: Hip hop
- Occupations: Musician; rapper; record producer
- Instruments: Vocals; keyboards
- Years active: 1999–present
- Labels: Brand New Music; Otherside
- Website: Official website

Korean name
- Hangul: 김진태
- Hanja: 金辰泰
- RR: Gim Jintae
- MR: Kim Chint'ae

Kim Jin-tae (Korean: 김진태; born December 19, 1980), better known by his stage name Verbal Jint (버벌진트), is a South Korean musician, rapper and record producer who is known for his innovations in Korean hip hop rhyme schemes. He established himself as one of South Korea's most popular underground rappers of the 2000s before achieving mainstream success. He is signed to the hip hop record label Brand New Music, under which he runs his own independent label, Otherside.

== Impact ==
Before Verbal Jint's official debut in 2001, Korean hip hop lacked a fundamental component of rap, the rhyming. Verbal Jint later said in an interview with The Korea Times, "People who came before us didn't have much interest in rhyming; artists before us were satisfied with talking fast and thinking that it was rapping – and that sold then." Verbal Jint's debut mini-album, Modern Rhymes, introduced new innovations in achieving the grammatical accuracy needed to arrange Korean successfully into rhymes. He was the first to create actual rhyme schemes in Korean and his method is now the standard for Korean rapping within the hip hop scene. The rhyme work and flow of his music have been considered revolutionary within the Korean music industry as they have rapidly changed the construction of Korean hip hop music and thus its style and lyrical qualities.

== Early life and education ==
Verbal Jint was born in Seoul, South Korea. He attended Hanyoung Foreign Language High School, earned an economics degree from Seoul National University, and is currently taking time off from pursuing a law degree at the Hanyang University School of Law.

Verbal Jint completed his mandatory military service for South Korea in the KATUSA program, where Korean soldiers who demonstrate a high level of English fluency and aptitude serve alongside United States Army forces in South Korea.

== Career ==
=== 1999–2008: Underground beginnings and hip hop innovation ===
Verbal Jint began his rap career as a member of the Korean hip hop crew "Show N Prove" (SNP) and released his first solo songs in 1999, including, "Big Brag," "How High School," and "Foul." He released his first mini-album, Modern Rhymes, in 2001. The album is credited with introducing rhyme schemes into Korean rapping.

It was several years until Verbal Jint's next releases, 2007's Favorite and 무명. The following year, he formed the hip hop crew Overclass with rappers Warmman and Lobotomy, among others. Notable rappers and singers including San E, Swings, and Urban Zakapa would later join the crew.

=== 2009–2011: Brand New Music and breaking into the mainstream ===
Verbal Jint experienced his first mainstream success in 2009, when his 2008 album, Framed, won Best Hip Hop Album at the Korean Music Awards. In 2010, he began releasing music under Brand New Stardom, a record label owned by rappers Cho PD and Rhymer. When the company split in two in 2011, Verbal Jint followed Rhymer to his new label Brand New Music.

In 2011, Verbal Jint collaborated with Swings, San-E, L.E.O., Baby Bu, Dawn, and designer Brownbreath on the song, "Stand Up, Japan!," with all proceeds from the digital single donated to help relief efforts after the Japanese Tohoku tsunami.

Later that year, he released the album Go Easy, and its single, "You Look Good," ultimately reached No. 5 on the Gaon Digital Chart. He promoted the single in October on music program You Hee Yeol's Sketchbook, where he also discussed his side-career as a voice actor in commercials. He also performed the song in Japan as a guest at actor and singer Jang Keun-suk's Tokyo Dome concert on November 26.

Verbal Jint held his first solo concert, "You Look Happier," in December 2011. The same month, he made his first appearance on the music show M! Countdown.

=== 2012–2014: Collaborations and first world tour ===
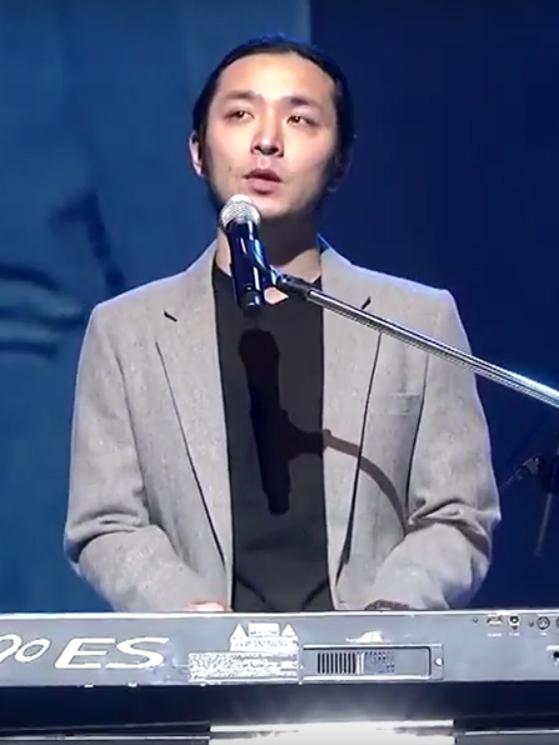
Verbal Jint in February 2013

In June 2012, Verbal Jint appeared in the first season of Mnet's hip hop reality program "Show Me the Money." His team, composed of himself and rookie rapper Go Young Bin, was eliminated in the second round after a performing a hip hop version of miss A's "Breathe."

That same month, he released the album, 10 Years of Misinterpretation. The album singles, "Good Morning," and "Pretty Enough" were hits, reaching No. 5 and No. 6, respectively, on the Gaon Digital Chart. He performed "Good Morning" in a special collaboration with the band 10cm in July at the two-day Green Groove Festival in Boryeong, alongside After School, Son Dambi, Wonder Girls and Akon.

Verbal Jint participated in several successful collaborations in 2013, including the hit singles "If It Ain't Love" featuring Ailee, "Hello" by legendary singer Cho Yong-pil, "Take Care of Christmas" with Shin Seung Hun, and a cover of Deux's "Only For You" with Bumkey. He also collaborated live with girl group Girl's Day at the Mnet 20's Choice Awards in July, and with Bumkey and San E at the SBS Gayo Daejun awards in December. That year, he fulfilled his long-time wish to collaborate with Hyolyn of SISTAR when she surprised him with an unscheduled appearance on You Hee Yeol's Sketchbook and subsequently featured in his performance of "You Look Good."

In May 2014, Verbal Jint went on a world tour with Bumkey, Beenzino, Kanto, and Hwayoung, holding concerts in New York City, Seattle, Los Angeles, and Sydney. He had planned to release a new album, entitled GO HARD Pt. 1: The OTHER SIDE prior to the tour, but he postponed the album's release indefinitely due to the Sewol Ferry Disaster. Later that year, a music video he featured in was delayed due to another disaster. He was featured along with Beenzino, Bobby, BI and Mino in Epik High's single "Born Hater" off their eighth studio album Shoebox. The music video was scheduled for pre-release on October 17, but was delayed one day to pay respect to the victims of the Pangyo Techno Valley vent collapse. The song received a 19+ rating for profanity and deemed inappropriate for broadcasting by KBS on their media channels. However, the song was a success and reached No. 3 on the Gaon Digital Chart.

Later that year, Verbal Jint featured on "Rainstorm by Rainstone," a collaborative track with producer Rainstone, American R&B singer Brian McKnight, and San E.

=== 2015–present: Show Me The Money and starting a new label ===
In 2015, Verbal Jint made his first appearance on the TV variety show Running Man in a "hip hop star special" with Jay Park, Jessi, and other rappers. He continued his variety show appearances that summer as a judge on the 4th season of Mnet's hip hop reality program Show Me the Money, where he represented record label Brand New Music alongside San E. He featured on charted singles from show contestants Black Nut and Basick, the latter of whom won the season as part of "Team Brand New Music." After the show's finale, Verbal Jint performed with the judges and contestants from the season in a world tour in South Korea and the United States. Later that year, he appeared on seasons one and two of Show Me the Money spin-off Unpretty Rapstar, during which he produced several singles for contestants.

Verbal Jint released two albums in 2015. On August 31, he released the mini-album Yeoja with Sanchez of the hip-hop trio Phantom. And, after three years of preparation, he released the album GO HARD Pt. 1: The OTHER SIDE on December 19. He also featured on several singles, including Girls' Generation's Taeyeon's solo debut's title track "I," which ranked number one across eight different real time music charts shortly after its release on October 7.

In November 2015, Brand New Music representatives announced that Verbal Jint plans to start an independent label while continuing to promote under Brand New Music.

== Voice actor work ==
In addition to his career as a rapper, Verbal Jint has provided voiceovers and narration for many TV shows and advertisements. His voice has appeared in South Korean TV commercials for brands including Vitamin Water, LG, and Hyundai.

== Discography ==
=== Studio albums ===
Title	Album details	Peak chart positions	Sales
Title	Album details	KOR	Sales
Mumeong (무명)	Released: November 27, 2007; Label: KT Music; Formats: CD, digital download	—	
Framed (누명)	Released: July 17, 2008; Label: KT Music; Formats: CD, digital download	—	
The Good Die Young	Released: October 26, 2009; Label: Sony Music; Formats: CD, digital download	—	
Go Easy	Released: August 31, 2011; Label: Brand New Music; Formats: CD, digital download	8	KOR: 7,417
10 Years of Misinterpretation 1 (10년 동안의 오독 I)	Released: June 21, 2012; Label: Brand New Music; Formats: CD, digital download	11	KOR: 5,851
Go Hard Part 1: Yanggachi (Go Hard Part 1: 양가치)	Released: December 19, 2015; Label: Brand New Music, Otherside; Formats: CD, digital download	15	KOR: 1,891
Inflection Point (변곡점)	Released: April 6, 2021; Label: Otherside; Formats: CD, digital download	41	
Modern Rhymes XX	Released: August 18, 2021; Label: Otherside; Formats: CD, digital download	41	
"—" denotes release did not chart.

=== Special albums ===
- Framed Afterplay (누명 Afterplay) (2008)
- Yanggachi Instrumentals (양가치 Instrumentals) (2015)
- 17 Acapellas (2017)
- Is It Music or Is It a Report? Instrumentals (이것은 음악인가 업무보고서인가 Instrumentals) (2019)
- Year End Report Instrumentals (연말결산보고서 Instrumentals) (2019)
- 20 Acapellas (2020)
- Inflection Point Instrumentals (변곡점 Instrumentals) (2021)
- Inflection Point Acapellas (변곡점 Acapellas) (2021)

=== Extended plays ===
Title	Album details	Peak chart positions	Sales
Title	Album details	KOR	Sales
Modern Rhymes	Released: July 13, 2001; Label: KT Music; Formats: CD, digital download	—	
Favorite	Released: May 11, 2007; Label: De Passion; Formats: CD, digital download	—	
2 The Hard Way (with Cho PD)	Released: April 15, 2010; Label: Brand New Stardom; Formats: CD, digital download	10	
Go Easy 0.5	Released: December 6, 2010; Label: Brand New Stardom; Formats: CD, digital download	15	
Yeoja (여자) (with Sanchez)	Released: August 31, 2015; Label: Brand New Music; Formats: CD, digital download	14	KOR: 766
No Excuses (변명없이)	Released: October 27, 2017; Label: Otherside; Formats: CD, digital download	—	
Is It Music or Is It a Report? (이것은 음악인가 업무보고서인가)	Released: May 13, 2019; Label: Otherside; Formats: Digital download	—	
Year End Report (연말결산보고서)	Released: December 17, 2019; Label: Otherside; Formats: Digital download	—	
"—" denotes release did not chart.

=== Singles ===
Title	Year	Peak chart positions	Sales	Album
Title	Year	KOR	Sales	Album
As lead artist
"Do You Put Oil On It?" (기름 같은걸 끼얹나) feat. deb, Beenzino	2010	91		Go Easy 0.5
"I Promise I Promise" (약속해 약속해) feat. G.NA	2010	42		Go Easy 0.5
"Available" (어베일러블) feat. Lady Jane	2011	44		Go Easy
"You Insulted Me" (넌 내게 모욕감을 줬어) feat. Koonta	2011	—		Go Easy
"You Look Good" (좋아보여) feat. The Black Skirts	2011	5	KOR: 2,500,000	Go Easy
"Gloomy Letters" (우울한 편지)	2011	39	KOR: 308,482	Non-album singles
"Thank You Thank You" (감사감사) feat. Yeonjin	2011	56	KOR: 181,565	Non-album singles
"Classic"	2012	64	KOR: 177,392	Non-album singles
"Good Morning" (굿모닝) feat. 10cm	2012	5	KOR: 1,798,590	10 Years of Misinterpretation 1
"You Deserve Better" (충분히 예뻐) feat. Sanchez	2012	6	KOR: 1,913,775	10 Years of Misinterpretation 1
"I Get Weak" (약한 사람) feat. Heo In-chang	2012	18	KOR: 278,487	Golden Time OST
"Closer Closer" (가까이 가까이)	2012	36	KOR: 177,749	The Thousandth Man OST
"Good Start" (시작이 좋아) feat. Kang Min-hee	2013	5	KOR: 860,829	Non-album singles
"If It Ain't Love" (이게 사랑이 아니면) feat. Ailee	2013	7	KOR: 923,610	Non-album singles
"Walking in The Rain" (비범벅) feat. Bumkey	2013	6	KOR: 673,840	Non-album singles
"Take Care of Christmas" (크리스마스를 부탁해) feat. Shin Seung-hun	2013	55	KOR: 100,825	Non-album singles
"Just Another Rapper" (반도의흔한랩퍼) feat. San E, Swings	2014	23	KOR: 212,845	Non-album singles
"Rare Breed" (희귀종) feat. YDG	2014	83	KOR: 52,077	Non-album singles
"I Smell Autumn" (가을냄새) feat. Eddy Kim	2014	17	KOR: 128,816	Non-album singles
"My Type 2" feat. Kang Min-kyung, Sanchez	2015	17	KOR: 105,243	Non-album singles
"If The World Is Perfect" (세상이 완벽했다면) feat. Taeyeon	2015	25	KOR: 57,152	Go Hard Part 1: Yanggachi
"True or False" (진실게임)	2016	—		Non-album singles
"I Wanna Know" (그것이알고싶다) feat. Car, the Garden	2017	—		Non-album singles
"Self-Suggestion" (자기암시) feat. Superbee	2017	—		No Excuses
"Break" feat. Babylon	2017	—		No Excuses
"Let It Snow" (눈도 오고 그래서) feat. Bumkey	2017	—		Non-album singles
"Trainee Girl" (연습생girl) feat. MXM	2018	—		Non-album singles
"Girlfriend" (여자친구) feat. Sik-K	2018	—		Non-album singles
"Gab Boon Sa" (갑분사) feat. Han Yo-han, Chang Suk-hoon	2019	—		Non-album singles
"Hey VJ"	2019	—		Non-album singles
"Stressin Me" (5월의 빡침포인트)	2019	—		Is It Music or Is It a Report?
"The Chase Revisited"	2019	—		Non-album single
"December" (주로 감사하는 12월) feat. Dbo	2019	—		Year End Report
"2020 Vision" feat. Young B	2020	—		Non-album single
"Cold World" (비정한 세상 피토하는 음악) feat. Mommy Son	2020	—		Inflection Point
"Dark Side" (흑화의 뜻) feat. Lil Boi	2020	—		Inflection Point
"Public Figure" (공인) feat. Swings, Han Yo-han	2021	—		Inflection Point
Collaborations
"Man Up" with Cho PD feat. Park Mi-kyung	2010	68		2 The Hard Way
"Happy Brand New Year" with Phantom, As One, Miss S, Swings, N-Son, Bumkey	2012	24		Non-album singles
"Only For You" (너에게만) with Bumkey	2013	4	KOR: 481,146	Non-album singles
"You Make Me Feel Brand New" with San E, Bumkey, Swings, Phantom, Kanto	2014	13		Non-album singles
"Brand New Day" with San E, Phantom, As One, P-Type, Taewan, Kang Min-hee, Kanto, Champagne & Candle, Yang Da-il, DJ IT	2014	30		Non-album singles
"Doin' It" (싫대) with Sanchez feat. Bumkey	2015	17	KOR: 229,797	Yeoja
"Favorite" with Sanchez	2015	98	KOR: 22,643	Yeoja
"Body 2 Body" (귀아래) with Sanchez feat. LE	2015	71	KOR: 31,276	Yeoja
"M.I.L.E. (Make It Look Easy)" with Blacknut, San E	2015	22	KOR: 246,260	Show Me the Money 4 OST
"I'm The Man" with Basick, San E	2015	97	KOR: 38,267	Show Me the Money 4 OST
"Heat It Up" (몸 좀 녹이자) with San E, Bumkey, Hanhae, Kanto, Kang Min-hee, Yang Da-il, Candle	2015	40		Non-album singles
"Read My Mind" (오늘 쓱) with Yang Da-il	2016	71	KOR: 51,243	Non-album singles
"Sunshine" with Chancellor	2016	—		Non-album singles
"Good Morning" (굿모닝) with Hanhae, feat. Wonstein	2021	— (Note: "Good Morning" did not enter the Gaon Digital Chart, but peaked at #45 on the component Download Chart.)		Non-album singles
"Say It Over" (구구절절) with Bumkey, Boombastic	2021	—		Non-album singles
"Young Posse Up"- Young Posse (ft. Verbal Jint, NSW Yoon, Token)	2024	—		Non-album singles
"—" denotes release did not chart.

=== Other charted songs ===
Title	Year	Peak chart positions	Album
Title	Year	KOR	Album
As lead artist
"I Promise I Promise 2012" (약속해 약속해 2012) feat. Jo Hyun-ah of Urban Zakapa	2012	91	Go Easy
"From Boys to Men 2013" (소년을 위로해줘 2013)	2012	92	10 Years of Misinterpretation 1
"Happy Birthday" (축하해 생일) feat. As One	2012	80	10 Years of Misinterpretation 1
"Perfect Day" (완벽한 날) feat. Ivy	2012	55	10 Years of Misinterpretation 1
As featured artist
"How Does Love Change" (사랑이 어떻게 변하니) Kim Kyung-rok (of V.O.S) feat. Verbal Jint	2011	97	Non-album single
"Learning to Love" (사랑을 글로 배워서) BNR feat. Lyn, Verbal Jint	2011	50	Purple Sunset
"What Do You Know" (니가 뭘 알아) NS Yoon-G feat. Verbal Jint	2011	34	Neo Spirit
"Day By Day 2012" As One feat. Verbal Jint	2012	25	Non-album single
"I Can't Live Because of You" (너 땜에 못살아) Seo In-guk feat. Verbal Jint	2013	4	Y.BIRD from Jellyfish Island With Seo In Guk
"Come As You Are" (몸만와) Phantom feat. Verbal Jint	2013	18	Phantom Power
"Be Warmed" (녹는중) Davichi feat. Verbal Jint	2013	1	Mystic Ballad
"Hello" Cho Yong-pil feat. Verbal Jint	2013	4	Hello
"It's Ok" C-Luv feat. Verbal Jint, Kahi	2013	84	Luv Is Back
"You Were Not The…" (니가 아니 었기를) Miss S, narration by Verbal Jint	2013	14	Lo$t & Found
"Where Did You Sleep" (어디서 잤어) San E, feat. Verbal Jint, Swings	2013	8	Not Based on the True Story
"Her Number" (전화번호) Swings feat. Verbal Jint, 40	2014	9	Mood Swings II, Pt. 2: Obsessive Compulsive Disorder
"Naughty Hands" (나쁜손) Sistar feat. Verbal Jint	2014	7	Touch N Move
"Sweet" (달아요) Lena Park feat. Verbal Jint	2014	44	Syncrofusion Lena Park + Brand New Music
"Born Hater" Epik High feat. Beenzino, Verbal Jint, B.I, Mino, Bobby	2014	3	Shoebox
"My Zone" Basick, Microdot, Black Nut, feat. Verbal Jint, San E	2015	12	Show Me the Money 4 OST
"I" Tayeon feat. Verbal Jint	2015	1	I
"Title Song" (타이틀곡) Dynamic Duo feat. Verbal Jint	2015	41	Grand Carnival
"Medicine" (약도 없대요) Baek Ji-young feat. Verbal Jint	2016	11	Non-album singles
"Like A Flower" (꽃같아) Yoo Jae-hwan feat. Verbal Jint	2016	20	Non-album singles
"Refrigerator" (냉장고) Gill feat. Lee Hi, Verbal Jint	2016	19	Non-album singles

== Filmography ==
=== Variety shows ===
Year	Title	Role
2012	Show Me The Money	Contestant
2015	Show Me the Money 4	Producer
2019	Show Me the Money 8	Producer

== Awards and nominations ==
Year	Recipient	Award	Category	Result
2004	Verbal Jint	HiphopPlaya Awards	Featuring Artist of the Year	Won
2009	Framed	Korean Music Awards	Best Hip-hop Album	Won
2011	"Go Easy"	Olleh Indie Awards	Album of the Month	Won
2011	"Pretty Enough"	HiphopPlaya Awards	Single of the Year	Won
2011	"Pretty Enough"	HiphopPlaya Awards	Music Video of the Year	Won
2012	Verbal Jint	Korean Music Awards	Male Musician of the Year Netizen Vote	Won
2012	"Good Morning"	Cyworld Digital Music Awards	June 2012 Song of the Month	Won
2012	"You Deserve Better"	Mnet Asian Music Awards	Best Rap Performance	Nominated
2013	"If It Ain't Love"	MelOn Music Awards	Best Rap Performance	Nominated
2013	"If It Ain't Love"	Mnet Asian Music Awards	Best Rap Performance	Nominated
2013	"If It Ain't Love"	Mnet 20's Choice Awards	20's Hot Rapper	Won
2014	"Born Hater"	HiphopPlaya Awards	Video of the Year	Won
2014	"Born Hater"	HiphopPlaya Awards	Collaboration of the Year	Won
