= Pretty Brown (duo) =

South Korean music duo

- Origin: Seoul, South Korea
- Genres: R&B
- Years active: 2015–present
- Labels: Rooftop Company; Brand New Music
- Members: Ku In-hoe; Kim Hyun-joong
- Website: www.rooftopcompany.co.kr

Pretty Brown (Hangul: 프리티브라운) is a South Korean duo under Rooftop Company. They debuted on March 20, 2015 with the single "Break Up With Break Up". They released their first album, Episode 1, on March 19, 2017.

== Discography ==
=== Studio albums ===
Title	Album details	Peak chart positions	Sales
Title	Album details	KOR	Sales
Episode 1	Released: March 19, 2017; Label: Rooftop Company, Brand New Music, LOEN Entertainment; Formats: CD, digital download	62	—

=== Charted singles ===
Title	Year	Peak chart positions	Sales (DL)	Album
Title	Year	KOR	Sales (DL)	Album
"Break Up With Break Up" (이별과 이별하다) feat. Kanto	2015	—	KOR: 15,511	Episode 1

=== Soundtrack appearances ===
Year	Title	Album
2017	"Vacancy" (빈자리)	I'm Sorry, But I Love You OST
