= As One (musical duo) =

South Korean R&B girl group

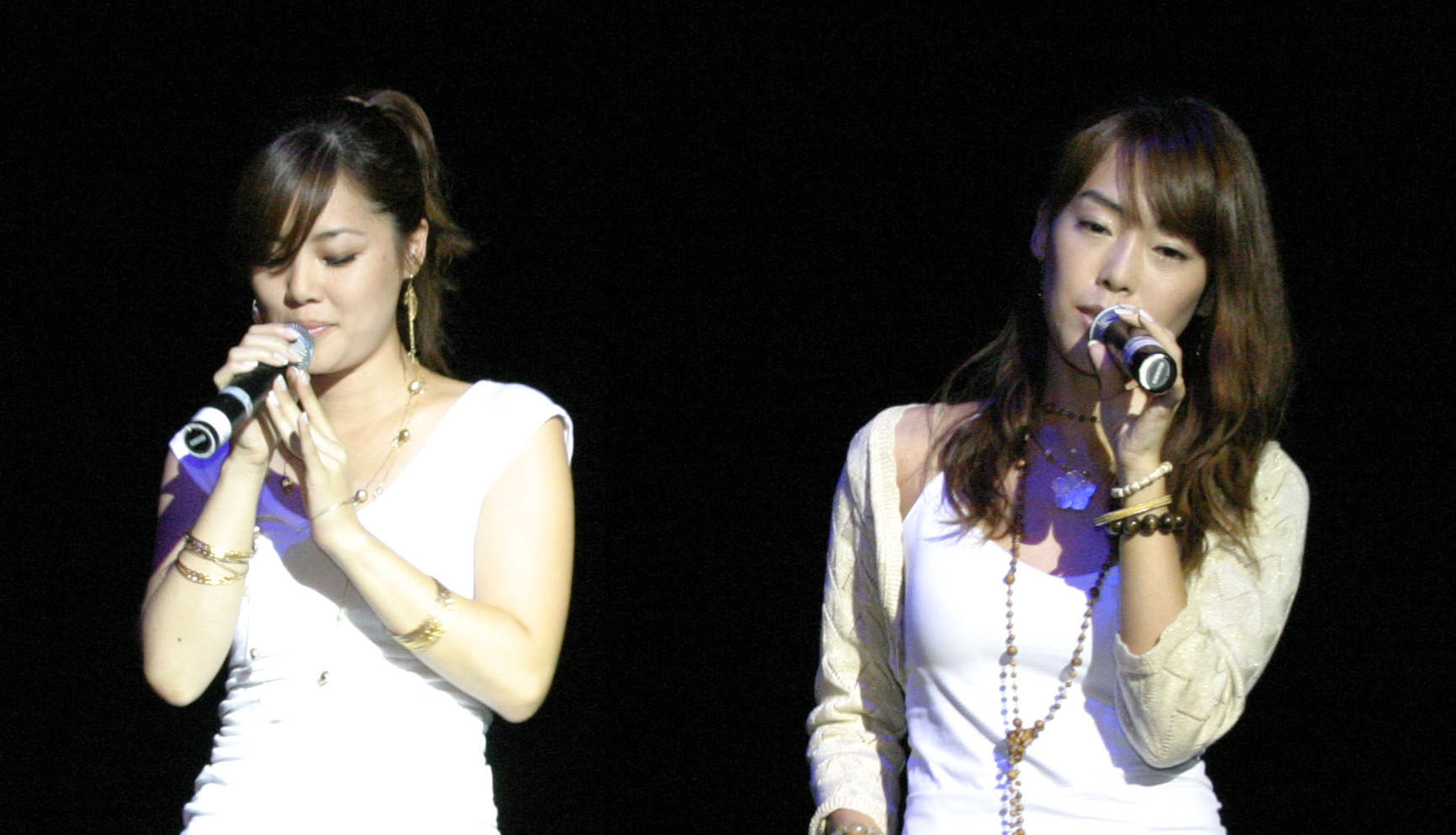
- As One in 2005; Left to right: Crystal and Lee Min

Background information
- Origin: South Korea
- Genres: K-pop; R&B
- Occupation: Singers
- Instrument: Vocals
- Years active: 1999–2017; 2019–2025
- Labels: Rock Records; Brand New Music
- Past members: Lee Min; Crystal
- Website: Official website

As One (Korean: 애즈원) was a South Korean R&B duo consisting of Korean-American singers Lee Min and Crystal. The group debuted in 1999 with the album Day by Day, and released five more albums before announcing their hiatus from the music industry in 2017 with the single, "Goodbye for Now". The group officially reunited in 2019, and continued to release music until member Lee Min's death in 2025.

== Career ==
Their first hit was the song "너만은 모르길" (Only You Wouldn't Know), released in 1999 by Rock Records. Between their fourth and fifth albums, their contract with Rock Records expired and they signed with EMI Music Publishing Korea; a label which also manages other K-pop stars like DJ DOC and Baby V.O.X.

In late 2006, As One released their fifth album 12 Tears of Farewell, and started their promotional activities with the lead track "십이야" (12 Nights).

In 2012, the duo signed to Brand New Music.

In contrast to their usual style, As One released a 19+ rated music video ahead of their October 29, 2014 release date for the single "오늘같은 날" (For the Night). The music video featured labelmate Jae Woong from 4-member hip hop group Troy and fitness model Kim Hae Na.

On June 20, 2016, As One made a comeback with a new single titled "The Pain I Caused". The song is from their sixth album Outlast, which was released on June 21, 2016. The album features ten tracks along with the lead single, "Don't Say Anything", which was released June 21, 2016. The pair appeared on JTBC's Sugarman 3 on December 13, 2019.

On August 5, 2025, the duo's management agency Brand New Music confirmed that Lee Min died at age 46 in Seoul, South Korea, thereby ending the group activities.

== Discography ==
=== Studio albums ===
Title	Album details	Peak chart positions	Sales
Title	Album details	KOR	Sales
Day By Day	Released: November 23, 1999; Label: Rock Records; Formats: CD, cassette	27	KOR: 92,843
You're Welcome (천만에요)	Released: August 16, 2001; Label: Rock Records; Formats: CD, cassette	7	KOR: 131,461
Carolling (Christmas album)	Released: November 28, 2002; Label: Rock Records; Formats: CD, cassette	31	KOR: 14,645
Never Too Far	Released: March 14, 2003; Label: Rock Records; Formats: CD, cassette	4	KOR: 51,095
Restoration	Released: November 16, 2004; Label: DR Music; Formats: CD, cassette	18	KOR: 11,385
12 Tears Of Farewell (이별이 남기는 12가지 눈물)	Released: November 17, 2006; Label: Lutherson Entertainment; Formats: CD, cassette	—	—N/a
Outlast	Released: June 20, 2016; Label: Brand New Music; Formats: CD, digital download	40	—N/a

=== Compilation and live albums ===
Title	Album details	Peak chart positions	Sales
Title	Album details	KOR	Sales
One + One	Released: June 28, 2000; Label: Rock Records; Formats: CD, cassette	36	KOR: 31,167
As One Live	Released: May 23, 2002; Label: Rock Records; Formats: CD, cassette	—	—N/a
Forever As One	Released: November 19, 2003; Label: Rock Records; Formats: CD, cassette	—	—N/a

=== Extended plays ===
Title	Album details	Peak chart positions	Sales
Title	Album details	KOR	Sales
So Romantic (우리가 알고있는 사랑 이야기 다섯)	Released: March 13, 2007; Label: Lutherson Entertainment; Formats: CD, digital download	—	—N/a
Sponge Remake 2008 As One	Released: April 3, 2008; Label: Sponge Entertainment; Formats: CD	—	—N/a
You Only Love (사랑은 너 하나뿐) with 2NB	Released: September 24, 2008; Label: NHN Bugs; Formats: CD	—	—N/a
Simply As One	Released: October 15, 2013; Label: Brand New Music; Formats: CD, digital download	40	—N/a

=== Singles ===
Title	Year	Peak chart positions	Sales	Album
Title	Year	KOR	Sales	Album
"For You Not to Know" (너만은 모르길)	1999	—N/a	—N/a	Day By Day
"Love+" (사랑+)	2000	—N/a	—N/a	Day By Day
"Day By Day"	2000	—N/a	—N/a	Day By Day
"Ring My Bell"	2000	—N/a	—N/a	Non-album single
"You're Welcome" (천만에요)	2001	—N/a	—N/a	You're Welcome
"Want and Resent" (원하고 원망하죠)	2001	—N/a	—N/a	You're Welcome
"Rockin' Around the Christmas Tree"	2002	—N/a	—N/a	Carolling
"Mr. A-Jo"	2003	—N/a	—N/a	Never Too Far
"I Hope Not" (아니길 바래요)	2003	—N/a	—N/a	Never Too Far
"Great Legacy" (위대한 유산)	2004	—N/a	—N/a	Restoration
"Twelve Nights" (十二夜) (십이야)	2006	—N/a	—N/a	12 Tears Of Farewell
"Jingle Bell Rock"	2006	—N/a	—N/a	Non-album single
"Zza Zza La"	2008	—N/a	—N/a	Sponge Remake 2008
"Kiss Me"	2008	—N/a	—N/a	Non-album single
"You Only Love" (사랑은 너 하나뿐) feat. Zio and Shogun	2008	—N/a	—N/a	You Only Love
"Sonnet"	2010	37	—N/a	Non-album singles
"History" (연애)	2010	—	—N/a	Non-album singles
"You Are My Baby"	2011	67	—N/a	Non-album singles
"Nepa Song" (네파송)	2011	—	—N/a	Non-album singles
"Monologue" (혼잣말)	2011	53	KOR: 384,806	Simply As One
"The Lie" (거짓말)	2011	28	KOR: 312,683	Non-album singles
"Only U" feat. Lee Donghae	2012	20	KOR: 318,434	Non-album singles
"Day By Day 2012" feat. Verbal Jint	2012	25	KOR: 181,418	Non-album singles
"Awkward Love" (사랑이 어색해)	2013	37	KOR: 164,783	Simply As One
"What Are We?" (우리 무슨 사이야?) feat. Bumkey	2013	15	KOR: 155,797	Simply As One
"Want and Resent 2013" (2013 원하고 원망하죠)	2013	20	KOR: 195,730	Non-album singles
"All Day All Night" feat. Kanto	2014	—	—N/a	Non-album singles
"For The Night" (오늘같은 날)	2014	97	KOR: 21,050	Outlast
"Even For 1 Minute" (1분만이라도) feat. Hanhae	2015	16	KOR: 105,469	Outlast
"After Rain" (비 개인 후 비) feat. KittiB	2016	—	KOR: 18,729	Outlast
"Don't Say Anything" (아무 말 안해도 돼)	2016	—	KOR: 21,411	Outlast
"The Pain I Caused" (아픈건 좀 어때)	2016	67	KOR: 33,045	Outlast
"Something Like Farewell" (이별 같은 거)	2016	—	KOR: 15,925	Non-album singles
"Goodbye for Now" (잠시만 안녕)	2017	—	—N/a	Non-album singles
"It's OK Not to Be OK" (잠시만 안녕) feat. Lee Dae-hwi of AB6IX	2019	194	—N/a	Non-album singles
"February 29th"	2020	—	—N/a	Non-album singles
"Something Like a Miracle"	2023	—	—N/a	Non-album singles
"Winter Wonderland"	2023	—	—N/a	Non-album singles
"Better"	2024	—	—N/a	Non-album singles
"Still My Baby"	2025	—	—N/a	Non-album singles
"Happy Birthday to You"	2025	—	—N/a	Non-album singles
"Until Always"	2025	—	—N/a	Non-album singles
"—" denotes release did not chart.

=== Collaborative singles ===
Title	Year	Peak chart positions	Sales	Album
Title	Year	KOR	Sales	Album
"Come To Me Again" (다시 내 곁으로) with Son Ho-young	2007	—N/a	—N/a	So Romantic
"It's Today" (오늘이야) with Leessang	2007	—N/a	—N/a	So Romantic
"Holiday" with 2NB	2007	—N/a	—N/a	Non-album singles
"My Girl" (두근두근쿵쿵) with Shingun	2008	—N/a	—N/a	Non-album singles
"Lovin' Ice Cream" with EZ-Life	2011	97	KOR: 88,147	Kwak Tae-hun Project 4
"Love Is Coffee" with Kang Kyun-sung	2012	55	KOR: 202,827	Kwak Tae-hun Project 4
"Together" with FREAKX	2012	—	—N/a	Non-album single
"Happy Brand New Year" with Brand New Music artists	2012	24	KOR: 292,674	Brand New Year
"It's Gonna Be Alright" (솧을거야) with Miss S	2013	19	KOR: 178,871	Non-album singles
"Just Tears" (그저 눈물만) with Sijin	2014	97	KOR: 19,252	Non-album singles
"Brand New Day" with Brand New Music artists	2014	30	KOR: 100,723	Brand New Year Vol. 3
"A Lonely Christmas" (혼자 메리 크리스마스) with Yang Da-il	2015	97	KOR: 25,151	Non-album singles
"Forever Summer" (여름아 가지마) with Kang Min-hee, Mellie	2016	—	—N/a	Non-album singles
"I Wanna Date" (연애하고 싶어) with Romantic City	2016	—	—N/a	Non-album singles
"—" denotes release did not chart.

=== Soundtrack appearances ===
Title	Year	Peak chart positions	Sales	Album
Title	Year	KOR	Sales	Album
"Torn"	2003	—N/a	—N/a	Lavender (熏衣草) OST
"Do I Have to Be Sorry" (미안해야 하는 거니)	2005	—N/a	—N/a	Sassy Girl Chun-hyang OST
"Come On B.B"	2008	—N/a	—N/a	Powerful Opponents OST
"Lalala...Love Song"	2008	—N/a	—N/a	Worlds Within OST
"Behind You" (그대 뒤에서)	2010	83	—N/a	The Reputable Family OST
"Still In Love" (아직도 사랑입니까)	2012	—	—N/a	Can Love Become Money? OST
"Sadness and Longing" (아쉬움 또는 그리움)	2012	—	—N/a	Immortal Classic OST
"Closer Closer" (가까이 가까이) with Verbal Jint	2012	—	—N/a	The Thousandth Man OST
"Promise"	2012	—	—N/a	Kyurem vs. the Sword of Justice OST
"Here I Am"	2014	—	—N/a	Tears of Heaven OST
"What Should I Do" (어떡하죠) with Eluphant	2015	87	KOR: 23,073	The Man in the Mask OST
"Happy" (행복해) with Kiggen	2016	—	—N/a	Five Enough OST
"—" denotes release did not chart.

== Awards and nominations ==
Year	Awards	Category	Recipient	Result
2000	Mnet Km Music Festival	Best R&B Performance	"For You Not to Know" (너만은 모르길)	Nominated
2001	Mnet Km Music Festival	Best Female Group	"I'm Fine" (천만에요)	Nominated
2003	Mnet Km Music Festival	Best Female Group	"Mr.A-Jo"	Nominated
