= Troy (band) =

South Korean boy band

- Origin: Seoul, South Korea
- Genres: K-pop; hip hop; R&B
- Years active: 2014–present
- Labels: Brand New Music
- Members: Bumkey; Jaewoong; Changwoo; Kanto
- Website: www.brandnewmusic.co.kr/artist/troy

Troy (Korean: 트로이) is a South Korean hip hop boy band formed by Brand New Music in 2014. The group consists of 4 members: Bumkey, Jaewoong, Changwoo, and Kanto. Troy debuted on March 14, 2014, with "Green Light".

== Discography ==
=== Singles ===
Title	Year	Peak chart positions	Sales (DL)	Album
Title	Year	KOR	Sales (DL)	Album
"Green Light" (그린라이트)	2014	32	KOR: 88,828	Non-album singles
"Why are We?" (변해가)	2014	72	KOR: 31,786	Non-album singles
