= Kang Min-hee =

South Korean singer (born 1991)

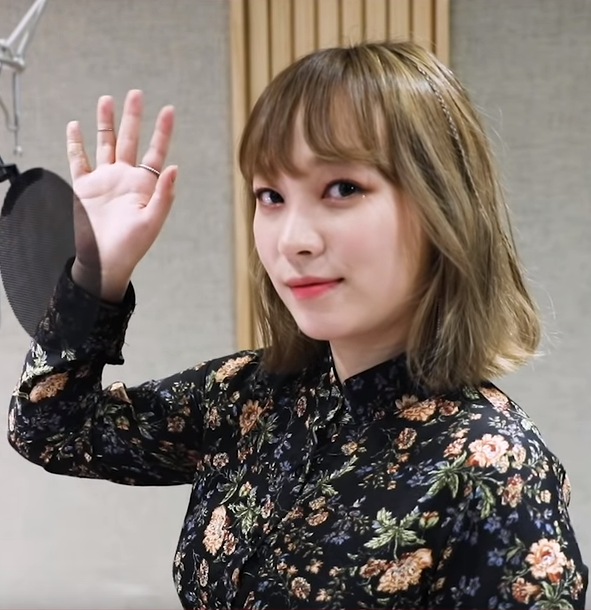
- Kang in March 2019

Background information
- Born: December 29, 1991 (age 33); South Korea
- Genres: K-pop; R&B
- Occupation: Singer
- Years active: 2007–present
- Labels: Brand New Music
- Member of: Miss S
- Website: Official website

Korean name
- Hangul: 강민희
- RR: Gang Minhui
- MR: Kang Minhŭi

Kang Min-hee (Korean: 강민희; born December 29, 1991) is a South Korean singer and member of the hip hop duo Miss S. She is best known for her collaborations with her Brand New Music label mates, including Verbal Jint and San E. In 2017, she was a contestant on the survival reality show The Unit.

== Discography ==
=== Singles ===
Title	Year	Peak chart positions		Sales (DL)	Album
Title	Year	KOR Gaon	KOR Hot 100	Sales (DL)	Album
As lead artist
"It's You"	2013	—	—	KOR: 25,112+	Non-album singles
"Does He Talk About Me?" (내 얘긴 안해?) feat. San E	2014	50	—	KOR: 68,565+	Non-album singles
"Yahae" (야해) feat. Jimin of AOA	2015	80	—	KOR: 27,633+	Non-album singles
"Her" (한때 그 여자)	2017	—	—	—	Non-album singles
"Never Sent" (널 보낸 적 없어) feat. Han Dong-geun	2017	—	—	—	Non-album singles
"Toddle" (걸음마)	2018	—	—	—	Non-album singles
Collaborations
"Call Me Noona" (누나라고 불러) with Kanto	2014	42	50	KOR: 60,184+	Non-album single
"Brand New Day" with Brand New Music artists	2014	30	—	KOR: 91,013+	Brand New Year Vol. 3
"Play Me" (놀이) with Yang Da-il, feat. San E	2015	100	—	KOR: 21,922+	Non-album single
"Heat It Up" (몸 좀 녹이자) with Brand New Music artists	2015	40	—	KOR: 81,612+	Brand New Year 2015
"Our Night is More Beautiful Than Your Day" with Bomi, Namjoo, LE, Seo In-young, Lee Seok-hoon, ₩uNo, Yang Da-il, Brother Su, Chancellor	2016	89	—	KOR: 28,346+	Merry Summer
"Forever Summer" (여름아 가지마) with As One, Mellie	2016	—	—	—	Non-album single
"Already Christmas" (어느새 크리스마스) with Yang Da-il, Chancellor, MC Gree, As One	2016	—	—	KOR: 13,992+	Brand New Year 2016
As featured artist
"Good Start" (시작이 좋아) Verbal Jint feat. Kang Min-hee	2013	5	4	KOR: 860,829+	Non-album single
"Stay With Me" 2LSON feat. Kang Min-hee, Evo	2015	99	—	KOR: 28,490+	Non-album single
"#Uncomfortable" (#불편해) Rex.D feat. Kang Min-hee	2015	79	—	KOR: 23,907+	Non-album single
Soundtrack appearances
"What's Wrong With Me?" (나 왜이래) San E feat. Kang Min-hee	2014	4	8	KOR: 952,054+	You're All Surrounded OST
"—" denotes song did not chart. The Kpop Hot 100 chart was inactive between May 2014 and May 2017.
