= Yang Da-il =

South Korean singer

- 양다일
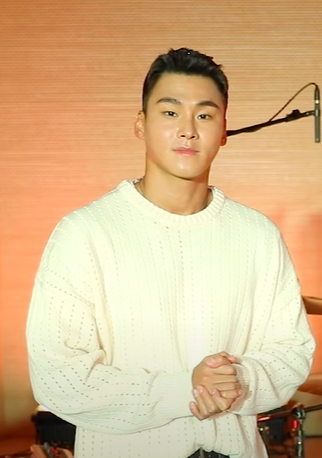
- Yang in 2021
- Born: February 21, 1992 (age 33); South Korea
- Occupation: Singer
- Musical career
- Genres: Ballad
- Instrument: Vocals
- Years active: 2010–present
- Labels: Brand New Music

Korean name
- Hangul: 양다일
- RR: Yang Dail
- MR: Yang Tail

Yang Da-il (Korean: 양다일; born February 21, 1992), is a South Korean singer. He released his first EP, Say, on April 27, 2016.

== Discography ==
=== Studio albums ===
Title	Album details	Peak chart positions	Sales
Title	Album details	KOR	Sales
Inside	Released: December 29, 2017; Label: Brand New Music; Formats: CD, digital download	63	—N/a

=== Extended plays ===
Title	Album details	Peak chart positions	Sales
Title	Album details	KOR	Sales
Say	Released: April 27, 2016; Label: Brand New Music; Formats: CD, digital download	69	—N/a
Us	Released: November 3, 2016; Label: Brand New Music; Formats: CD, digital download	90	—N/a
Skepticism	Released: April 26, 2019; Label: Brand New Music; Formats: CD, digital download	72	—N/a

=== Singles ===
Title	Year	Peak chart positions	Sales (DL)	Album
Title	Year	KOR	Sales (DL)	Album
As lead artist
"Think" (널)	2015	—	—N/a	Non-album single
"Love Again" feat. Solar	2016	—	KOR: 23,029+	Say
"She Didn't Love Me" (사랑했던걸까)	2016	95	KOR: 26,594	Say
"Don't Leave" (떠나지마)	2016	76	KOR: 48,634	Us
"You" (네게)	2017	47	KOR: 38,345	Inside
"Lie" (미안해)	2017	24	—N/a	Inside
"Sorry" (고백)	2018	2	—N/a	Non-album single
"Tonight" (이 밤)	2019	38	—N/a	Skepticism
"My Love"	2019	86	—N/a	Non-album singles
"A Glass of Soju" (소주 한 잔)	2022	96	—N/a	Non-album singles
"Love Is" (사랑이란) prod. by Rocoberry	2022	143	—N/a	Non-album singles
"Wish I Could Tell You" (괴로워)	2022	134	—N/a	Non-album singles
"May I Love You" (사랑해도 될까요)	2023	48	—N/a	Non-album singles
"Flower" (꽃)	2023	164	—N/a	Non-album singles
"Things I Can't Say" (내가 할 수 없는 말)	2023	190	—N/a	Non-album singles
Collaborations
"Brand New Day" with Brand New Music artists	2014	30	KOR: 100,723	Brand New Year Vol. 3
"We're Different" (우린 알아) with Jung Key	2015	44	KOR: 82,854	Non-album singles
"Play Me" (놀이) with Kang Min-hee, feat. San E	2015	100	KOR: 21,922	Non-album singles
"Heat It Up" (몸 좀 녹이자) with Brand New Music artists	2015	40	KOR: 100,780	Brand New Year 2015
"A Lonely Christmas" (혼자 메리 크리스마스) with As One	2015	97	KOR: 25,151	Non-album singles
"Read My Mind" (오늘 쓱) with Verbal Jint	2016	71	KOR: 51,243	Non-album singles
"Our Night Is More Beautiful Than Your Day" (우리의 밤은 당신의 낮보다 아름답다) with Bomi, Namjoo, LE, Seo In-young, Lee Seok-hoon, ₩uNo, Kang Min-hee, Brother Su, Chancellor	2016	89	KOR: 28,346+	Merry Summer
"And Then" (그리워) with Hyolyn	2016	19	KOR: 88,463	Non-album single
"Already Christmas" (어느새 크리스마스) with Brand New Music artists	2016	—	KOR: 13,992	Brand New Year 2016
"How About You" (너는 어때) with Candle	2017	—	—N/a	Non-album singles
"A Piece of You" (한 편의 너) with Dokyeom	2017	88	KOR: 23,576	Non-album singles
"Baby Can I" (너가 필요한 것 같아) with Brand New Music artists	2017	—	—N/a	Brand New Year 2017
"Night Reminiscin`" (그런 밤) with Luna	2018	—	—N/a	Non-album singles
"One Summer" (그해 여름) with Wendy	2018	40	—N/a	Non-album singles
"Sweater" (스웨터) with Brand New Music artists	2018	—	—N/a	Brand New Year 2018
"Goodbye List" (헤어진 우리가 지켜야 할 것들) with Kim Na-young	2019	4	—N/a	Non-album single
"—" denotes releases that did not chart.

=== Soundtrack appearances ===
Title	Year	Peak chart positions	Album
Title	Year	KOR	Album
"The Reason Why" (이렇게 좋은 이유)	2017	—	The Bride of Habaek OST
"Touch of Love"	2017	—	Hospital Ship OST
"It Was You" with San E	2018	—	Live Again, Love Again OST
"The Truth Is..." (사실은...) with Hanhae	2018	—	Luv Pub OST
"With You" (곁)	2018	—	Tempted OST
"When Will I See You" (언제쯤 보일까)	2018	—	My Secret Terrius OST
"I'm Here"	2019	53	Memories of the Alhambra OST
"Only You" (너만 너만 너만)	2019	33	Hotel del Luna OST
"Love" (사랑 이토록 어려운 말)	2020	111	Dr. Romantic 2 OST
"Diary of Dawn" (너만 너만 너만)	2020	—	Tale of the Nine Tailed OST
"Where the Stars Rose" (별이 뜬 곳에)	2021	133	Bunny and Her Boys (Webtoon) OST
"Peacock" (낙화 (落花))	2021	—	You Are My Spring OST
"You & I" (그대와 나)	2021	— (Note: "You & I" did not enter the Gaon Digital Chart but peaked at number 64 on the component Download Chart.)	Lovers of the Red Sky OST
"—" denotes releases that did not chart.

== Awards and nominations ==
The name of the award ceremony, year presented, nominee(s) of the award, award category, and the result of the nomination
Year	Award ceremony	Category	Nominee(s)	Result	Ref.
2020	Gaon Chart Music Awards	MuBeat Global Choice Award (Male)	Yang Da-il	Nominated	
