= Phantom (band) =

South Korean hip-hop group

Phantom 팬텀
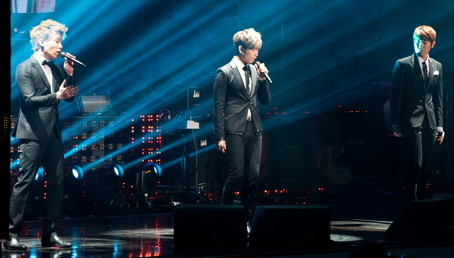
- Phantom in April 2013

Background information
- Origin: South Korea
- Genre: Hip hop
- Years active: 2011–2015
- Labels: Brand New Music; Rainbow Bridge World
- Past members: Kiggen; Sanchez; Hanhae

Phantom (Korean: 팬텀) was a South Korean hip hop boy band consisting of three members: Kiggen, Sanchez and Hanhae. They were managed by Brand New Music and Rainbow Bridge World. The group released numerous single albums and two mini-albums: Phantom City and Phantom Theory. In 2014, the group released its first full-length album, Phantom Power. After two years of inactivity, Phantom disbanded in 2017.

== Career ==
=== Beginnings and YouTube covers ===
Kiggen began his career as an underground producer and composer. He released his first solo album, a hip-hop and jazz hybrid called Pianissimo, in 2007. That same year, he started an electronic music project called HybRefine. The group's only album, 2010, was released in 2010 and featured Sanchez on the single, "Cosmo Dance." Hanhae was a trainee under Stardom Entertainment and an original member of k-pop group Block B. He left the group before its debut and released his own mixtape, Eargasm, in 2011.

After joining Brand New Music, all three artists appeared in the music video for label mate Verbal Jint's single, "You Look Good," in 2011. As Phantom, they released several videos that year on YouTube, including "19 Song," a medley of songs that had been banned by the South Korean Ministry of Gender Equality and Family, and "Freddie 'Phantom' Mercury Singing The Boys", which featured Sanchez emulating Queen's lead singer Freddie Mercury while singing the song "The Boys" by girl group Girls' Generation.

=== Hole In Your Face and Rookie of the Month award ===
On 25 November 2011, Phantom released their first single album, Hole In Your Face (얼굴 뚫어지겠다). The music video teaser was released the same day on their official YouTube channel. The video, which depicted a girl being shot in the head by a gun, was immediately controversial due to its graphic nature, and the group released a censored version soon after.

Phantom was awarded "Rookie of the Month" at the Cyworld Digital Music Awards for December 2011, despite the fact that the group hadn't yet made its official debut. However, they made many performances over the next few months, appearing alongside popular artists including Verbal Jint, Bizniz, Swings, and Mighty Mouth. The group also appeared in music videos by Verbal Jint, Absalute Music, and Skull.

=== Phantom City and Phantom Theory ===
In August 2012, Phantom released the ballad, "Seaweed Soup". They followed up with their first mini-album, Phantom City, a few days later, reaching #10 on the Gaon Album Chart. Phantom made their music show debut with the album track, "Burning", which they performed on M! Countdown, Music Bank, Music Core, and Inkigayo. The group won Best New Artist at the Korean Culture Entertainment Awards that year.

In January 2013, Phantom released their second mini-album, Phantom Theory, which debuted at #12 on the Gaon Album Chart. They also released a music video for the single "Like Cho Young Pil".

=== Phantom Power ===
Phantom released their first full-length album, Phantom Power, in May 2014. The album featured guest artists San E, Verbal Jint, Navi, and Ga In, the last of whom featured on title track, "Seoul Lonely". The album debuted at #16 on the Gaon Album Chart.

== Discography ==
=== Studio albums ===
Title	Album details	Peak chart positions	Sales
Title	Album details	KOR	Sales
Phantom Power	Released: May 19, 2014; Label: Rainbow Bridge World, Brand New Music; Formats: CD, digital download	16	KOR: 1,369

=== Extended plays ===
Title	Album details	Peak chart positions	Sales
Title	Album details	KOR	Sales
Phantom City	Released: August 16, 2012; Label: WA Entertainment, Brand New Music; Formats: CD, digital download	10	KOR: 3,000
Phantom Theory	Released: January 17, 2013; Label: WA Entertainment, Brand New Music; Formats: CD, digital download	13	KOR: 2,825

=== Singles ===
==== As lead artist ====
Title	Year	Peak chart positions	Sales	Album
Title	Year	KOR	Sales	Album
"Hole in Your Face" (얼굴 뚫어지겠다)	2011	90	—N/a	Phantom City
"Ice" (하이트광고음악)	2012	—	—N/a	Phantom City
"Seaweed Soup" (미역국)	2012	56	KOR: 51,053	Phantom City
"Burning"	2012	33	KOR: 275,294	Phantom City
"Like Cho Yong-pil" (조용필처럼)	2013	45	KOR: 157,846	Phantom Theory
"Come As You Are" (몸만와) feat. Verbal Jint	2013	18	KOR: 242,102	Phantom Power
"I Already Know" (다알아)	2013	17	KOR: 132,005	Phantom Power
"New Era" (신세계) feat. Navi	2013	34	KOR: 95,148	Phantom Power
"Seoul Lonely" (오늘따라) feat. Gain	2014	23	KOR: 231,353	Phantom Power
"Fly" (날아올라)	2014	—	KOR: 25,137	Non-album singles
"A Story About My Ex" (이제 보니까)	2014	79	KOR: 25,323	Non-album singles
"Could You Be Mine" (확신을 줘)	2015	—	—N/a	Non-album singles
"—" denotes releases that did not chart.

==== Collaborations ====
Title	Year	Peak chart positions	Sales	Album
Title	Year	KOR	Sales	Album
"Mistletoe" (미슬토우) with Geeks, Esna	2013	24	KOR: 98,228	Non-album single

== Awards ==
Year	Nominated work	Award	Category	Result
2011	"얼굴 뚫어지겠다 (Hole in Your Face)"	Cyworld Digital Music Awards	December 2011 Rookie of the Month	Won
2012	Phantom	Korean Culture Entertainment Awards	Best New Artist	Won
