= Sanchez (rapper) =

South Korean rapper (born 1986)

- 산체스
- Born: Shin Jae-min; October 17, 1986 (age 39); Jecheon, South Korea
- Occupations: Rapper; singer
- Relatives: Microdot (brother)
- Musical career
- Genres: Hip hop
- Instrument: Vocals
- Years active: 2010–present
- Label: Brand New Music
- Formerly of: Phantom

Korean name
- Hangul: 신재민
- RR: Sin Jaemin
- MR: Sin Chaemin

Shin Jae-min (Korean: 신재민; born October 17, 1986), better known by his stage name Sanchez (산체스), is a South Korean–New Zealand rapper and singer. He is a former member of the hip hop boy band Phantom.

== Early life ==
Sanchez was born on October 17, 1986, in South Korea and is the older brother of the rapper Microdot. He and his family emigrated to Auckland, New Zealand, when he was a child.

== Discography ==
=== Studio albums ===
Title	Album details	Peak chart positions	Sales
Title	Album details	KOR	Sales
Sanchez Manual	Released: July 16, 2021; Label: Now-or-Never Records; Formats: CD, digital download; Track listing: 1. "Passing Stars"; 2. "Love Shimmer"; 3. "Love Hurts"; 4. "Million & Billion"; 5. "Heartbreak" (featuring Microdot); 6. "That's What She Said"; 7. "One More Drink"; 8. "In Our Time"; 9. "Ode to Nujabes"; 10. "Iron Lady"; 11. "90s Best"; 12. "More and More rev2" (featuring Microdot); 13. "Cold." (featuring Microdot)	—	—N/a
"—" denotes release did not chart.

=== Extended plays ===
Title	Album details	Peak chart positions	Sales
Title	Album details	KOR	Sales
Girl (여자) (with Verbal Jint)	Released: August 31, 2015; Label: Rainbow Bridge World, Brand New Music, LOEN Entertainment; Formats: CD, digital download; Track listing: 1. "Good Times"; 2. "Favorite!"; 3. "Spot the Different" (featuring Stella Jang); 4. "My Type 2.5" (featuring Kang Min-kyung); 5. "Doin' It" (featuring Bumkey); 6. "Body 2 Body" (featuring LE); 7. "Good Night"	14	KOR: 766
감성 (Colour)	Released: August 26, 2017; Label: Rainbow Bridge World, Brand New Music, LOEN Entertainment; Formats: CD, digital download; Track listing: 1. "Blush"; 2. "Mesmerised" (featuring Yong Jun-hyung); 3. "5 More Minutes" (featuring Beenzino); 4. "Dear Summer" (featuring Microdot); 5. "Between Calm and Passion"; 6. "Nothing's Changed"; 7. "Mesmerised - Inst."; 8. "5 More Minutes - Inst."; 9. "Dear Summer - Inst."	—	—N/a
"—" denotes release did not chart.

=== Singles ===
Title	Year	Peak chart positions	Sales	Album
Title	Year	KOR	Sales	Album
As lead artist
"Claustrophobia" (대기실) feat. Killagramz	2016	—	—N/a	Non-album singles
"Come Closer" (가까이 와요) feat. Kassy	2016	—	—N/a	Non-album singles
"5 More Minutes" (5분만 더) feat. Beenzino	2017	48	KOR: 64,826	감성 (Colour)
"Mesmerised" (최하고 있어) feat. Yong Jun-hyung	2017	—	—N/a	감성 (Colour)
Collaborations
"Beautiful Day" with G.NA	2012	37	KOR: 209,199	Dokkun Project
"Doin' It" (싫대) with Verbal Jint feat. Bumkey	2015	17	KOR: 199,640	Girl
"Favorite" with Verbal Jint	2015	98	KOR: 22,643	Girl
"Body 2 Body" (귀아래) with Verbal Jint feat. LE	2015	71	KOR: 31,276	Girl
"Love Letter" with Microdot	2015	—	KOR: 20,795	Non-album single
"—" denotes releases that did not chart.

== Filmography ==
Year	Title	Network	Role
2016	Show Me The Money 5	Mnet	Contestant
2017	King of Mask Singer	MBC	Contestant
