= Bumkey =

South Korean singer

- 권기범
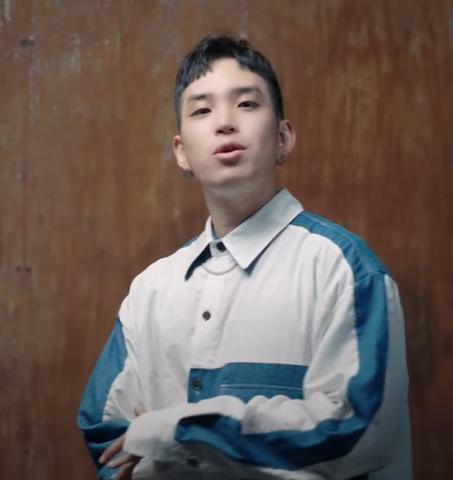
- Bumkey in 2021
- Born: Kwon Ki-bum; September 22, 1984 (age 42); Seongbuk-dong, Seoul, South Korea
- Occupation: Singer
- Years active: 2010–present
- Spouse: Kang Da-hye (m. 2014)
- Children: 1
- Musical career
- Genres: R&B, Korean hip hop
- Label: Brand New Music
- Website: brandnewmusic.co.kr

Kwon Ki-bum (Korean: 권기범, born September 22, 1984), known as Bumkey (범키), is a South Korean R&B singer under Brand New Music. He made his musical debut in 2010 as part of the hip hop duo 2winS and is currently a member of the Korean hip hop and R&B quartet Troy.

== Life and career ==
Kwon Ki-bum was born September 22, 1984, in Seoul. His family moved to Los Angeles in 1999, where he lived for five years before returning to Korea alone in 2004 to pursue a music career.

Early in his career, he featured on songs by both underground and mainstream hip hop artists including Dynamic Duo, Brown Eyes, and Epik High, being credited as either Kwon Ki-bum or Bumkey. However, after undergoing vocal chord surgery to treat a chronic sore throat, he was left unable to speak. It was two years before he regained his singing ability.

In 2010, Bumkey debuted as part of the duo 2winS (투윈스) with TopBob, formerly of the hip hop group TBNY. The duo promoted actively on Korean music shows with Supreme Team and on various radio programs throughout 2010. Bumkey also featured in songs by Paloalto, Dok2, SouLime, and Dynamic Duo.

After signing with Brand New Music, Bumkey made his solo debut with the single "Bad Girl," in April 2013. The song was produced by Primary and featured E-Sens of Supreme Team. Bumkey released his second single, "Attraction," in August with a music video starring Crayon Pop's Ellin. The song was a success, ranking fifth on the Instiz iChart, a collation of all real-time Korean music charts, for the third week of August and topping the Gaon Digital Singles Chart. Bumkey performed in Crayon Pop's PopCon concert in Seoul on October 30.

In 2014, Brand New Music introduced its new hip hop group Troy, with Bumkey as group leader. Bumkey was part of a world tour in May (as part of the Asian Music Festival) with Verbal Jint, Beenzino, Sanchez, and Troy bandmate Kanto, performing in New York City, Seattle, Los Angeles, and Sydney, Australia. He married former Planet Shiver member Kang Da-hye in June.

In October 2014, Bumkey was arrested and charged with selling and taking illegal substances, specifically ecstasy and Philopon, a type of methamphetamine. Bumkey denied the allegations. In April 2015, the court found him to be not guilty.

== Personal life ==
On June 13, 2014, Bumkey married DJ Kang Da-hye in Samseong-dong, Seoul. His wife gave birth to a son on July 27, 2016.

== Discography ==
=== Studio albums ===
Title	Album details	Peak chart positions	Sales
Title	Album details	KOR	Sales
U-Turn	Released: January 27, 2016; Label: Brand New Music, LOEN Entertainment; Formats: CD, digital download; Track listing: 1. "reborn" 2. "Better Man" (featuring Tablo); 3. "Natural Woman" (featuring Chancellor); 4. "Surprise (featuring Beenzino); 5. "Don't be afraid" 6. "backindadayz" (featuring Dok2, Microdot, Sanchez & dh-style); 7. "Never Too Late"; 8. "My Everything; 9. "Amazing Grace"; 10. "Better Man - Instrumental"; 11. "Natural Woman - Instrumental"; 12. "Surprise - Instrumental"	37	KOR: 548
The Obedient	Released: March 21, 2024; Label: Brand New Music, Kakao Entertainment; Formats: CD, digital download; Track listing: 1. "The breath of God"; 2. "If he says so" (with Han Jee-hee); 3. "Way Maker" (with Gianni); 4. "Zeal of God (To. Angels of Fightingale)"; 5. "God, He Shares Our Pain"; 6. "Just as I am" 7. "The Lord watches over you" 8. "Stay in me" 9. "In Christ Alone"; 10. "Amazing Grace (Remastered)"	—	
"—" denotes release did not chart.

=== Singles ===
Title	Year	Peak chart positions	Sales (DL)	Album
Title	Year	KOR	Sales (DL)	Album
"Bad Girl" (미친연애) (feat. E Sens)	2013	2	KOR: 1,184,703	Non-album singles
"Attraction" (갖고놀래) (feat. Dynamic Duo)	2013	1	KOR: 944,002	Non-album singles
"Home" (집이 돼줄게)	2014	5	KOR: 356,442	Non-album singles
"My Everything" (느껴)	2015	6	KOR: 292,282	U-Turn
"Better Man" (feat. Tablo)	2016	30	KOR: 128,865	U-Turn
"Surprise" (서프라이즈) (feat. Beenzino)	2016	35	KOR: 61,338	U-Turn
"First Moment" (널 마주한 순간)	2017	91	KOR: 27,053	Non-album single
"Breathing All Day" (숨쉬는 모든 날)	2017	—	KOR: 17,997	Suspicious Partner OST
"Hmm" (흠) (feat. Hanhae)	2017	—	KOR: 17,243	Non-album single
"Carpet" (with Yesung)	2019	—	—N/a	[SM STATION 3]
"The Lady" (feat. Moonbyul)	2021	135	—N/a	Non-album single
"—" denotes release did not chart.

=== Collaborations ===
Title	Year	Peak chart positions	Sales (DL)	Album
Title	Year	KOR	Sales (DL)	Album
"Love Song" with Rhythmking	2012	—	—N/a	Non-album singles
"Only For You" (너에게만) with Verbal Jint	2013	4	KOR: 481,146	Non-album singles
"Don't Be Happy" (행복하지마) with Mamamoo	2014	20	KOR: 157,980	Non-album singles
"How Much Is Your Love" (얼마짜리 사랑) with Wheesung feat. Jessi	2014	15	KOR: 89,078	Non-album singles
"Son E Ga" (손이 가) with Chancellor	2015	—	KOR: 18,344	Non-album singles
"Love Line" with Hyolyn, Jooyoung	2015	27	KOR: 160,676	Non-album singles
"Come Back to Me" with D Gerrard	2019	—	—N/a	Non-album singles
"Automatic Remix" (with Chancellor, Jay Park, Lee Hi, Bibi, Jamie, Moon, Samuel Seo, Suran, Babylon, Hoody, Sumin, MRSHLL, Ann One, Elo, twlv, oceanfromtheblue, Jiselle, Sole, Thama, K.vsh, Jinbo, Jerd, Soovi, B.E.D., Xydo, Owell Mood, and None)	2020	—	—N/a	Non-album singles
"Forever Love" with Mew Suppasit	2022	—	—N/a	Non-album singles
"—" denotes releases that did not chart.

== Awards and nominations ==
Year	Recipient	Category	Award	Result
2013	Bumkey	R&B Artist of the Year	HIPHOPPLAYA Awards	Won
2013	Bumkey	Best New Male Artist	15th Mnet Asian Music Awards	Nominated
