= Bizniz =

South Korean singer (born 1982)

- Born: Harold Ha; March 16, 1982 (age 44)
- Origin: South Korea
- Genres: Hip hop
- Occupations: Rapper; singer
- Years active: 1999–present
- Labels: H&L Entertainment (2008–2009); Brand New Stardom (2009–2011); Brand New Music (2011–present)
- Website: Official website

Harold Ha (Korean: 하원택; born March 16, 1982), better known as Bizniz (비즈니즈), is a Korean American rapper and singer signed to Brand New Music. He debuted as a member of Korean hip hop group Infinite Flow in 1999, and he released his first solo EP, This Is Bizniz, in 2008.

== Discography ==
=== Albums ===
- Ego (2010)
- Angstblute (2012)

=== EPs ===
- This Is Bizniz (2008)
- Strictly Bizniz (2012)
- #evolution (2013)
