= San E =

South Korean rapper (born 1985)

San E 정산
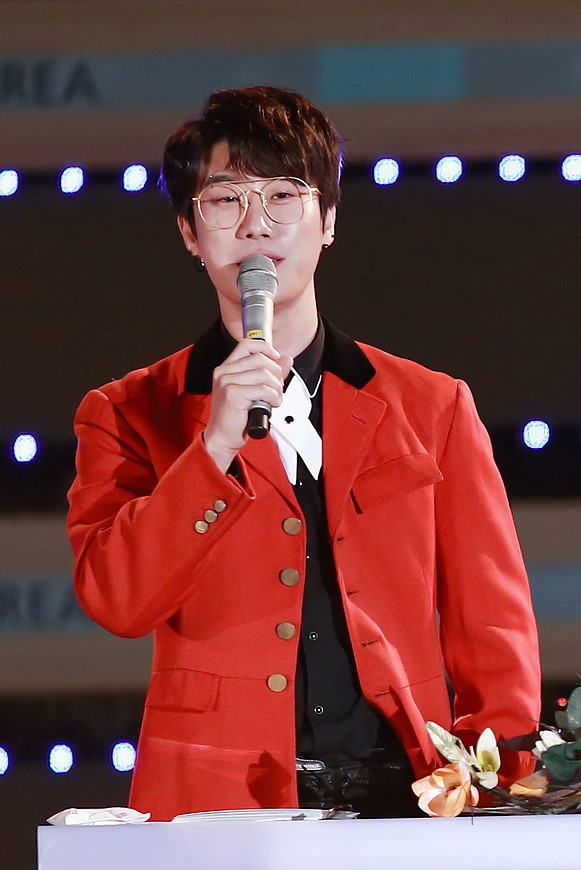
- San E at the Friendship Super Show on October 14, 2017

Background information
- Born: Jung San; January 23, 1985 (age 41); Bupyeong District, Incheon, South Korea
- Genre: Hip hop
- Occupations: Rapper; songwriter
- Instrument: Vocals
- Years active: 2008–present
- Labels: JYP; Brand New; FameUs Entertainment
- Spouse: Unknown (m. 2022)

Jung San (Korean: 정산; born January 23, 1985), more commonly known by his stage name San E (산이), is a South Korean rapper. He debuted in 2010 under JYP Entertainment, where he was the label's first solo rapper. He left the company in 2013 to sign with hip hop label Brand New Music. He left the company in 2018 and established hip hop label FameUs Entertainment in 2019.

San E has released one full-length album: The Boy Who Cried Wolf (2015), and three extended plays: Everybody Ready? (2010), 'Not' Based on the True Story (2013), and Season of Suffering (2017). San E has received several major awards, including Best Hip Hop Song at the 2010 Korean Music Awards, Best Rap Performance at the 2015 Mnet Asian Music Awards, and the Hip Hop Award at the 2016 Golden Disc Awards and at the 2016 Seoul Music Awards.

== Early life ==
San E was born on January 23, 1985, in South Korea. He moved with his family to Atlanta, Georgia, US, when he was a middle school student because his parents had been struggling financially as a result of the 1997 Asian financial crisis. He attended the University of Georgia, where he majored in graphic design.

== Career ==
=== 2008–2009: Mixtapes and underground fame ===
San E released his first mixtapes Ready To Be Signed and Ready To Be Famous in 2008 and 2009, respectively. As a way to draw attention to his self-released music, San E jokingly dissed established underground rapper Verbal Jint in one of his songs. The diss brought him attention from the Korean hip hop community and from Verbal Jint himself, who invited San E to join his hip hop crew, Overclass.

=== 2010–2012: JYP Entertainment and Everybody Ready? ===
Still unsigned, San E won Best Hip Hop Song at the 2010 Korean Music Awards for the track "Rap Genius." Soon after, he became the first solo rapper to sign with JYP Entertainment, one of the "big three" records labels in the k-pop industry. That September, he released his first mini-album, Everybody Ready?, which featured fellow JYP Entertainment artists Min (of Miss A), Jun. K (of 2PM), Joo and Yeeun (of Wonder Girls). He debuted several days later on the television music show, M Countdown, with his single "Tasty San," featuring Min. In November, San E started another round of promotions for the single, "LoveSick," the music video for which starred label mate Sohee of Wonder Girls.

In 2011, San E released several singles, including "Please Don't Go," a collaboration with rapper Outsider and singer Lee Changmin (of 2AM). The song reached #14 on the Gaon Digital Chart, making it his highest charted song while contracted under JYP Entertainment. He also collaborated that year with Verbal Jint, Beenzino, Swings, and other artists on the single "Stand Up, Japan!" which benefited Japan's relief efforts after the Tohoku tsunami.

=== 2013–2018: Brand New Music and top ten success ===
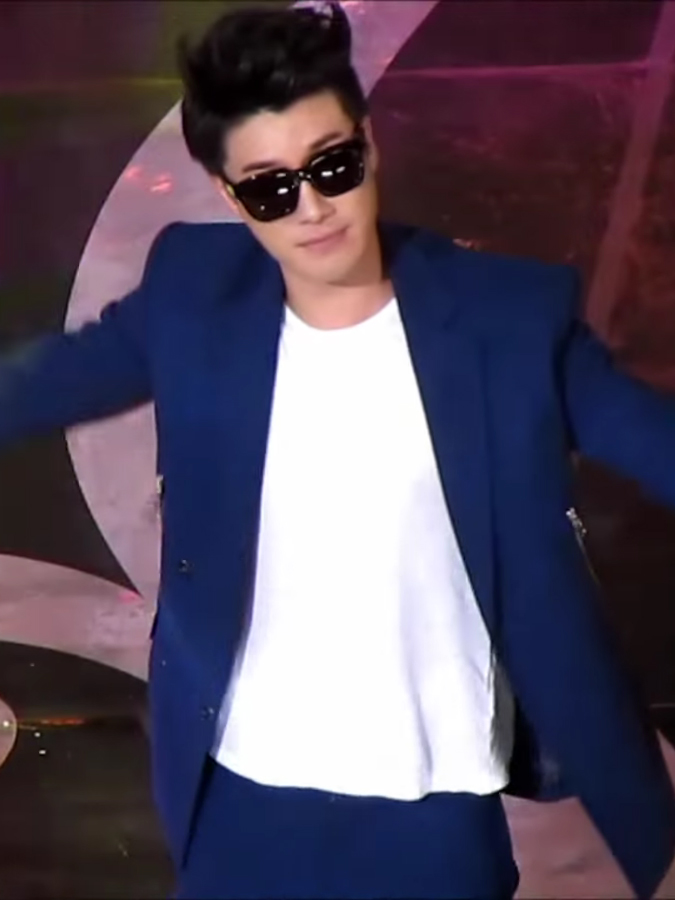
San E at the 2014 Seoul International Drama Awards

In April 2013, San E ended his contract with JYP Entertainment, saying that he was leaving on good terms. That June, he joined hip hop label, Brand New Music, home to his Overclass crew mate, Verbal Jint. San E achieved his first #1 hit on the Gaon Digital Chart with the song, "Story of Someone I Know," from the album 'Not' Based on the True Story. His next three singles, "Where Did You Sleep?" (feat. Verbal Jint and Swings), "Break-Up Dinner" (feat. Sanchez of Phantom), and "What's Wrong With Me" (feat. Kang Min Hee), all reached the top ten of the Gaon Digital Chart. San E's success continued with the single "A Midsummer Night's Sweetness," a collaboration with Raina (of After School). The song was an instant hit and achieved #1 on ten music charts shortly after its debut. The song went on to win awards that year at the Gaon Chart K-Pop Awards, the MelOn Music Awards, and the Seoul Music Awards. His next single, "Body Language" (featuring Bumkey), was also a #1 hit, topping both the Gaon Digital Chart and seven Korean real-time music charts shortly after its release, despite its 19+ rating. In June 2017, San E was featured in Hyoyeon's single "Wannabe". San E was also the rap mentor for KBS2's survival show, The Unit.

In late 2018, Brand New Music terminated San E's contract after the rapper made a series of controversial remarks about feminism.

=== 2019–present: CEO of FameUs Entertainment ===
In 2019, San E established hip hop label FameUs Entertainment and recruited rappers Errday, Malkey, and Be'O. They released their first compilation album God FameUs on April 9, 2020.

== Personal life ==
=== Relationship and marriage ===
San-E married his girlfriend in a private ceremony on September 24, 2022, in Cheongdam-dong, Gangnam-gu, Seoul.

On September 13th, 2025, San E announced he and his wife were expecting their first child.

== Discography ==
=== Studio albums ===
Title	Album details	Peak position	Sales
Title	Album details	KOR	Sales
The Boy Who Cried Wolf (양치기 소년; Yangchigi Sonyeon)	Released: April 23, 2015; Label: Brand New Music, LOEN; Formats: CD, digital download	17	1,816+

=== Extended plays ===
Title	Album details	Peak position	Sales
Title	Album details	KOR	Sales
Everybody Ready?	Released: September 13, 2010; Label: JYP Entertainment; Formats: CD, digital download	20	[No data available]
'Not' Based on the True Story	Released: November 21, 2013; Label: Brand New Music, LOEN; Formats: CD, digital download	27	1,558+
Season of Suffering	Released: January 23, 2017; Label: Brand New Music, LOEN; Formats: CD, digital download	22	845+
Ballad Rap Song	Released: December 12, 2019; Label: FameUs Entertainment; Formats: Digital download	—	—N/a

=== Charted songs ===
Title	Year	Peak position	Sales	Album
Title	Year	KOR	Sales	Album
"Tasty San" (feat. Min)	2010	45	[No data available]	Everybody Ready?
"LoveSick"	2010	19	[No data available]	Everybody Ready?
"Someone's Dream" (feat. So Hyang)	2011	48	[No data available]	Dream High OST Pt. 3
"Please Don't Go" (feat. Outsider & Changmin)	2011	14	407,462+	Non-album single
"Wish U To Be Unhappy" (feat. Bee of Rphabet)	2011	54	242,259+	Non-album single
"Big Boy" (feat. Bee of Rphabet)	2011	39	108,996+	Non-album single
"Story Of Someone I Know"	2013	1	1,139,790+	'Not' Based on the True Story
"Where Did You Sleep?" (feat. Verbal Jint & Swings)	2013	8	570,537+	'Not' Based on the True Story
"Break-Up Dinner" (feat. Sanchez of Phantom)	2013	3	608,340+	'Not' Based on the True Story
"What's Wrong With Me" (feat. Kang Min-hee)	2014	4	952,054+	You're All Surrounded OST Pt.1
"A Midsummer Night's Sweetness" (with Raina)	2014	1	2,176,748+	Non-album single
"Body Language" (feat. Bumkey)	2014	1	727,872+	Non-album single
"Brand New Day" (with Brand New Music artists)	2014	30	100,723+	Brand New Year Vol.3
"Coach Me" (with Hyolyn) (Feat. Jooheon)	2015	16	150,317+	No Mercy Part.1
"On Top Of Your Head" (모두가 내 발 아래; Moduga Nae Bal Arae) (feat. MC Gree)	2015	17	122,579+	The Boy Who Cried Wolf
"Me You" (feat. Baek Yerin)	2015	2	1,127,476+	The Boy Who Cried Wolf
"Like Father, Like Son" (그 아버지에 그 아들; Geu Abeojie Geu Aduel)	2015	23	143,833+	Non-album single
"Sour Grapes" (못 먹는 감; Mot Meongneun Gam) (with Mad Clown)	2015	2	774,942+	Non-album single
"Like An Airplane" (마치 비행기; Machi Bihaenggi) (feat. Gary)	2016	12	250,502+	Non-album single
"Sugar and Me" (달고나; Dalgona) (with Raina)	2016	5	418,248+	Non-album single
"I Am Me" (feat. Hwasa of Mamamoo)	2017	61	28,700+	Season of Suffering
"Mohae" (feat. Bolbbalgan4)	2017	5	158,185+	Non-album single
"A Midsummer Night's Sweetness: Summer Again" (한여름밤의 꿀: 다시 여름; Hannyeoreumbamui Kkul: Dasi Yeoreum) (with Raina)	2021	62		Non-album single

== Filmography ==
=== Television variety programs ===
Year	Title	Notes
2014	Show Me The Money 3	Appeared throughout season as producer on "Team Brand New Music."
2015	Show Me The Money 4	Appeared throughout season as producer on "Team Brand New Music."
2015	Unpretty Rapstar	Host of season 1
2015	Unpretty Rapstar 2	Host of season 2
2015	Off to School	Cast member for episodes 44-46
2016	Hip Hop Nation	Co-host with Shin Dong Yup
2016–2017	Battle Trip	Co-host (until April 2017)
2017	The Unit	Mentor/Host of season 1
2018	High School Rapper 2	Mentor
2021	Show Me the Money 10	Contestant

== Awards and nominations ==
=== Gaon Chart K-Pop Awards ===
Year	Nominee / work	Award	Result
2013	"Story of Someone I Know"	Song/Artist of the Year (August)	Won
2014	"A Midsummer Night's Sweetness" (with Raina)	Song/Artist of the Year (July)	Won

=== Golden Disk Awards ===
Year	Nominee / work	Award	Result
2015	"A Midsummer Night's Sweetness" (with Raina)	Digital Bonsang	Nominated
2016	The Boy Who Cried Wolf	Best Rap/Hip Hop Award	Won

=== Korean Music Awards ===
Year	Nominee / work	Award	Result
2010	"Rap Genius"	Best Hip Hop Song	Won

=== MelOn Music Awards ===
Year	Nominee / work	Award	Result
2014	"A Midsummer Night's Sweetness" (with Raina)	Best Song	Nominated
2014	"A Midsummer Night's Sweetness" (with Raina)	Hot Trend	Nominated
2014	"A Midsummer Night's Sweetness" (with Raina)	Rap/Hip Hop	Won
2014	"What's Wrong With Me?"	OST	Nominated

=== Mnet Asian Music Awards ===
Year	Nominee / work	Award	Result
2014	"A Midsummer Night's Sweetness" (with Raina)	Song of the Year	Nominated
2014	"Body Language"	Song of the Year	Nominated
2014	"Body Language"	Best Rap Performance	Nominated
2014	"A Midsummer Night's Sweetness" (with Raina)	Best Collaboration	Nominated
2015	"Me You"	Song of the Year	Nominated
2015	"Me You"	Best Rap Performance	Won

=== Seoul Music Awards ===
Year	Nominee / work	Award	Result
2014	San E & Raina	Hip Hop/Rap Award	Won
2015	San E	Hip Hop/Rap Award	Won
