= BrandNew Music =

South Korean record label

BrandNew Music Co., Ltd.
- Native name: 브랜뉴 뮤직
- Type: Private
- Industry: Music; entertainment
- Genre: Hip hop; K-pop; R&B; electronic
- Predecessor: IC Entertainment; BrandNew Production; BrandNew Stardom
- Founded: May 17, 2012; 14 years ago
- Founder: Rhymer
- Headquarters: Seoul, South Korea
- Number of locations: Bangbae, Seocho District
- Key people: Rhymer (founder and CEO)
- Services: Music production; Licensing; Publishing
- Subsidiaries: Korean Roulette
- Website: www.brandnewmusic.co.kr

BrandNew Music Co., Ltd. (Korean: 브랜뉴 뮤직, initialized as BNM) is a South Korean hip hop company founded in 2011 by rapper Rhymer.

== History ==
=== 2003–2012: Founding and first-generation artists ===
Kim Se-hwan (Korean: 김세환), known as Rhymer, founded the record label IC Entertainment in 2003 after having failed to establish a career as a rapper since his debut in 1995. The label later changed its name to BrandNew Production. In 2009, BrandNew Production merged with Future Flow, a record label owned by rapper and producer Cho PD. The combined company was named BrandNew Stardom.

BrandNew Stardom split into two companies in 2011, with Cho PD founding Stardom Entertainment and Rhymer founding BrandNew Music. Artists Verbal Jint, Tae Hye Young, BNR, Keeproots, A-Man, and Miss S followed Rhymer to the new label.

Following the split of BrandNew Stardom in 2011, the newly founded Stardom Entertainment sued BrandNew Music, saying that Oh Yoo-mi, a member of Miss S, was still contracted with Stardom. According to BrandNew Music, the two companies had previously agreed that "neither company would restrict Miss $'s movement."

BrandNew Music released its first label collaboration, "Happy BrandNew Year," at the end of 2012. Artists Verbal Jint, Phantom, As One, Miss S, Swings, Shijin, and Bumkey all contributed to the single. It reached #24 on Korea's Gaon Digital Chart.

=== 2013–2016: second-generation artists ===
In January 2013, BrandNew Music launched its own Internet show, BrandNew Live. That summer, rapper San E left major music label JYP Entertainment and joined BrandNew Music. He has since become one of the most awarded artists in the label and one of the most successful rappers in Korean mainstream media.

In early 2014, the label released its second collaboration, "You Make Me Feel Brand New", featuring Verbal Jint, San. E, Bumkey, Kanto, Swings and Phantom. The song samples the 1974 American soul hit song of the same name by The Stylistics. The single reached #13 on the Gaon Digital Chart. Later that year, R&B singer C-Luv (now known as Taewan) joined the label, having debuted ten years prior under Rhymer's BrandNew Production label. A few months later, rapper Swings left the label to focus on his own record label, Just Music Entertainment. In December, the label released "BrandNew Day," its third collaboration, which featured Verbal Jint, San E, Phantom, As One, P-Type, Taewan, Kang Min-hee (of Miss $), Kanto, Champagne & Candle, Yang Da-il and DJ IT. The song reached #30 on the Gaon Digital Chart. The year ended with Bumkey of the group Troy being indicted for dealing illegal drugs. Bumkey denied the allegations and was found not guilty in a trial the following year.

Several artists joined BrandNew Music in 2015, including Eluphant, Gree, Pretty Brown, and Unpretty Rapstar 2 contestant KittiB. BrandNew Music released its fourth label collaboration, "Heat It Up" in December. The song featured San E, Verbal Jint, Bumkey, Hanhae, Kanto, Kang Min-hee, Yang Da-il and Candle.

2016 saw new additions to the label including the Esbee, Chancellor, and actor Yang Dong-geun who raps under the name YDG.

=== 2017–present: Sub-label and new generation artists ===
In 2017, BrandNew Music launched its indie sub-label "Korean Roulette", led by Kiggen as president. The first act to sign under it was the duo SBGB. In July 2017, BrandNew formed a duo MXM.

On May 22, 2019, BrandNew debuted their first idol group AB6IX, with Lee Dae-hwi, Park Woo-jin, Kim Dong-hyun and Jeon Woong among the members. On October 29, BrandNew debuted BDC. On December 26, Han Dong-geun signed an exclusive contract with the company.

On August 31, 2020, artist Lee Eun-sang, formerly of X1, made his solo debut.

On April 20, 2022, BrandNew debuted their third boy group Younite.

== Artists ==
Soloists

- Bumkey (since 2013)
- DJ It
- DJ Juice
- Gree (since 2014)
- Hanhae (since 2011)
- Lee Eun-sang (since 2019)
- Muzie (since 2023)
- Rhymer (since 2011)
- Taewan (since 2014)
- Verbal Jint (since 2011)
- Vincent Blue (since 2019)

Groups

- AB6IX
- As One
- Eluphant
- Younite

Producers

- 9999
- Dong Ne-hyeong
- LISHBEATS
- MasterKey
- NOMAD
- On The Road
- Won Young-heon
- XEPY
- Yellow Willow

Entertainers

- Lee Dae-woo

== Former artists ==
Soloists

- Bizniz
- Esna (2019)
- Chancellor (2016–2018)
- Esbee
- Han Dong-geun (2019–2024)
- Henney
- J'Kyun (2011–2014)
- Kang Min-hee
- Kang So-yeon
- Kanto (2014–2023)
- Kiggen (2011–2018)
- KittiB (2015–2020)
- Lee Kang
- P-Type (2011–2017)
- Rudals (2015–2022)
- San E (2013–2018)
- Sanchez (2011–2018)
- Swings (2013–2014)
- Yang Da-il (2014–2025)
- Yang Dong-geun
- Yenjamin (2018–2022)
- Yo Da-young

Groups

- BDC (2019–2023)
- Miss S
- MXM (2017–2018)
- Phantom (2011–2017) (co-produced with RBW)
- Pretty Brown (2015–2017) (co-produced with ROOFTOP Company)
- Troy (2014–2017)

Members of current groups

- Hyeunseung (Younite, 2022–2024)
- Lee Min (As One, 2012–2025)
- Lim Young-min (MXM and AB6IX, 2017–2020)

== Discography ==
Title	Year	Artists	Peak chart positions	Sales (DL)
Title	Year	Artists	KOR	Sales (DL)
"Happy BrandNew Year"	2012	Verbal Jint; Phantom; As One; Miss S; Swings; N-Son; Bumkey	24	KOR: 292,674
"BrandNew Anthem"	2012	Swings; Rhymer; P-Type; Heo In-chang; Bizniz; Kanto	—	—N/a
"You Make Me Feel Brand New"	2014	Verbal Jint; San E; Bumkey; Swings; Phantom; Kanto	13	KOR: 192,831
"BrandNew Day"	2014	Verbal Jint; San E; Phantom; As One; P-Type; Taewan; Kang Min-hee; Kanto; Champagne & Candle; Yang Da-il; DJ It	30	KOR: 100,723
"High" (잘 되길 바래)	2014	Champagne & Candle; Hanhae; Kanto	—	—N/a
"Heat It Up" (몸 좀 녹이자)	2015	San E; Verbal Jint; Bumkey; Hanhae; Kanto; Kang Min-hee; Yang Da-il; Candle	40	KOR: 100,780
"BrandNew Shit"	2015	Verbal Jint; San E; Phantom; P-Type; Eluphant; Champagne; Gree; DJ Juice	—	—N/a
"Respect the Name"	2016	San E; Hanhae; P-Type; Gree; Minos; Kebee; KittiB; Kanto; DJ Juice	—	—N/a
"Already Christmas" (어느새 크리스마스)	2016	Yang Da-il; Chancellor; Gree; As One; Kang Min-hee	—	KOR: 13,992
"Better Tomorrow"	2016	San E; Minos; Hanhae; Kanto; Champagne; Sanchez; Taewan	—	—N/a
"Baby Can I" (너가 필요한 것 같아)	2017	Bumkey; Chancellor; Taewan; Sanchez; Yang Da-il; MXM	—	—N/a
"Fresh Air"	2017	Verbal Jint; Eluphant; DJ Juice; Hanhae; Rudals	—	—N/a
"Do Your Thing" (다 해도 돼)	2018	Verbal Jint; Bumkey; Eluphant; Hanhae; Kanto; Gree; Yenjamin	—	—N/a
"Sweater" (스웨터)	2018	Bumkey; Yang Da-il; Taewan; Kang Min-hee; MXM; Vincent Blue	—	—N/a
"Melting"	2019	Kanto; AB6IX; Kang Min-hee; Yo Da-young; BDC	—	—N/a
"Look Good"	2019	Bumkey; Yang Da-il; Kebee; Kanto; KittiB; Gree; Yenjamin; Vincent Blue	—	—N/a
"Chandelier" (샹들리에)	2020	AB6IX; BDC; Lee Eun-sang	—	—N/a
"Better Days" (바래)	2020	Bumkey; Yang Da-il; Han Dong-geun; Kang Min-hee; Yo Da-young	—	—N/a
"1 Year"	2020	Eluphant; Hanhae; Kanto; Yenjamin; Rudals; Gree	—	—N/a

== Concerts ==
- BrandNew Year 2015 (December 12, 2015)
- BrandNew World Seoul (September 22, 2017)
- BrandNew Year 2017 BrandNew Season (December 22, 2017)

== See also ==
- Korean hip hop
- Stardom Entertainment
