= Unpretty Rapstar discography =

Korean competition television show

- Compilation albums: 3

Unpretty Rapstar (Korean: 언프리티 랩스타) is a South Korean rap competition TV show that airs on Mnet. The show has thus far released three compilation albums.

== Compilation albums ==
Title	Album details	Peak chart positions	Sales
Title	Album details	KOR	Sales
Unpretty Rapstar Compilation	Released: April 24, 2015; Label: CJ E&M; Format: CD, digital download	12	KOR: 1,699
Unpretty Rapstar 2 Compilation	Released: December 2, 2015; Label: CJ E&M; Format: CD, digital download	23	KOR: 1,439
Unpretty Rapstar 3 Compilation	Released: October 24, 2016; Label: CJ E&M; Format: CD, digital download	22	KOR: 563

== Unpretty Rapstar ==
Title	Year	Contestant(s)	Peak chart positions	Sales (DL)
Title	Year	Contestant(s)	KOR	Sales (DL)
"Stayed Up All Night" (밤샜지)	2015	Yuk Ji-dam	19	KOR: 194,469
"My Type" feat. Kangnam	2015	Jessi, Cheetah	2	KOR: 778,193
"Good Start 2015" (시작이 좋아 2015) feat. Seulong	2015	Jimin	2	KOR: 746,517
"Superstar" (슈퍼스타) feat. San E, Taewan	2015	Kisum	12	KOR: 433,640
"T4SA" feat. MC Meta, Nuck	2015	Jimin	50	KOR: 76,540
"Coma 07'"	2015	Cheetah	4	KOR: 426,120
"Puss" feat. Iron	2015	Jimin	1	KOR: 992,890
"It's All Good" (괜찮아)	2015	Jolly V	72	KOR: 43,340
"Unpretty Dreams"	2015	Jessi	11	KOR: 262,601
"Like Nobody Knows" (아무도 모르게) feat. Ailee	2015	Cheetah	4	KOR: 691,246
"On & On" feat. Baek Ye-rin	2015	Yuk Ji-dam	20	KOR: 155,875
"To.Mom" feat. Insooni	2015	Kisum	23	KOR: 179,594

== Unpretty Rapstar 2 ==
Title	Year	Contestant(s)	Peak chart positions	Sales (DL)
Title	Year	Contestant(s)	KOR	Sales (DL)
"Don't Stop" (언프리티 랩스타)	2015	Unpretty Rapstar 2 Contestants: Heize; Kasper; Ash-B; Hyolyn; Gilme; Ahn Soo-min; Yezi; KittiB; Sua; Yubin	17	KOR: 145,585
"If It Wasn't For Music" (음악이 아니었다면) feat. Cheetah, Verbal Jint	2015	Truedy	18	KOR: 124,648
"Me, Myself & I" feat. Jessi, Wheesung	2015	Heize	19	KOR: 155,254
"Solo (Remix)" feat. Jay Park, Loco	2015	Yezi	16	KOR: 201,459
"Money" (사랑 할 때 아니야) feat. Jay Park, Geegooin	2015	Hyolyn	36	KOR: 83,634
"Bandz Up" feat. Dok2	2015	Truedy	34	KOR: 84,589
"Entirely" (싹 다) feat. The Quiett	2015	Yubin	67	KOR: 46,930
"Close Call" (아슬아슬해) feat. Microdot, YDG	2015	KittiB	63	KOR: 46,276
"My Love" feat. Basick	2015	Hyolyn	28	KOR: 93,639
"Don't Make Money" (돈 벌지마) feat. Chanyeol	2015	Heize	43	KOR: 74,843
"This Aint Me" (바꾸지 마) feat. Ilhoon	2015	Jeon Ji-yoon	—	—
"RRF (Ronda Rousey Flow)"	2015	KittiB	—	—
"Pride" (자존심) feat. Gummy	2015	Truedy	77	KOR: 20,598
"Treat Me Roughly" (함부로 해줘) feat. Hanhae	2015	Yezi	27	KOR: 98,389
"Who Am I" (후횐 마) feat. Jo Hyun-ah	2015	Yubin	—	—
"Who Am I" feat. Suhyun	2015	Sua	—	KOR: 16,831
"Ruedy Boogie" (루디부기) feat. Tiffany	2015	Truedy	—	—

== Unpretty Rapstar 3 ==
Title	Year	Contestant(s)	Peak chart positions	Sales (DL)
Title	Year	Contestant(s)	KOR	Sales (DL)
"She's Coming"	2016	Unpretty Rapstar 3 Contestants: Grace; Nada; Miryo; Euna Kim; Yuk Ji-dam; Giant Pink; Jeon So-yeon; Janey; Kassy; Ha Ju-yeon	92	KOR: 16,756
"Bbam Bbam Hae" (빰빰해) feat. Gill, Mad Clown	2016	Yuk Ji-dam	36	KOR: 80,480
"Scary" (무서워)	2016	Nada, Jeon So-yeon	29	KOR: 65,910
"Sticky" feat. San E	2016	Nada	40	KOR: 84,575
"Ain't Got Nobody" feat. Dean	2016	Miryo	71	KOR: 41,488
"No Thx" feat. Suran, Dean	2016	Yuk Ji-dam	83	KOR: 22,899
"Nothing" feat. Swings	2016	Nada	70	KOR: 22,130
"I.M." feat. Jo Hyun-ah	2016	Miryo	—	—
"Children's Day" (어린이의 하루) feat. Superbee	2016	Jeon So-yeon	—	—
"Nasty" feat. Park Mi-kyung	2016	Nada	—	—
"Her" (그녀) feat. Son Seung-yeon	2016	Ash-B	—	—
"Heart" (심장) feat. Kim Na-young	2016	Yuk Ji-dam	—	—
"Bub" feat. Myundo	2016	Giant Pink	—	—
"Smile" (웃어) feat. Davii	2016	Jeon So-yeon	—	—
"King Pin" feat. Koonta, Don Mills	2016	Nada	—	—
"Knock" feat. Microdot	2016	Ash-B	—	—
"Beauty" (미인) feat. Kim Se-hwang, Dok2	2016	Giant Pink	—	—
"E.G.O." feat. Boi B, Sanchez	2016	Giant Pink	—	—

== See also ==
- Show Me the Money discography
