= G-code (disambiguation) =

G-code is a programming language for numerical control.

G-code or G code may also refer to:

== Music ==
- Tha G-Code, a 1999 album by rapper Juvenile
- G Code, a 2008 album by Korean rapper Eun Ji Won; see Eun Ji Won discography
- "G-Code", a song by Geto Boys in their 2005 album The Foundation
- "G Code", a song by hip hop artist Kendrick Lamar present in his mixtape C4

== Other uses ==
- Video recorder scheduling code, a video recorder programming system

== See also ==
- G programming language (disambiguation)
