= List of King of Mask Singer episodes (2017) =

- No. of episodes: 43

Release
- Original network: MBC
- Original release: January 1 – December 31, 2017

Season chronology
- ← Previous; 2016 Next → 2018

This is a list of episodes of the South Korean variety-music show King of Mask Singer in 2017. The show airs on MBC as part of their Sunday Night lineup. The names listed below are in performance order.

– Contestant is instantly eliminated by the live audience and judging panel
– After being eliminated, contestant performs a prepared song for the next round and takes off their mask during the instrumental break
– After being eliminated and revealing their identity, contestant has another special performance
– Contestant advances to the next round
– Contestant becomes the challenger
– Mask King

== Episodes ==
=== 46th Generation Mask King (cont.) ===
- Contestants : Heo Kyung-hwan, Yoo Yeon-jung (I.O.I/WJSN), Jung Seung-hwan, Byun Woo-min, Kim Hyun-jung (Space A), Kim Se-heon (Eve), Kim Myung-hoon (Ulala Session), Ji So-yun
Episode 92

Episode 92 was broadcast on January 1, 2017.

Order	Stage Name	Real Name	Song	Original artist	Vote
Round 2
Pair 1	Snow Cornice, Our Town	Yoo Yeon-jung of I.O.I/Cosmic Girls	Star (별)	Youme	34
Pair 1	Regional Defense Corps Desertman	Jung Seung-hwan	A Farewell Taxi (이별택시)	Kim Yeon-woo	65
Pair 2	Kettle Madam	Kim Hyun-jung of Space A	Bruise (멍)	Kim Hyun-jung	27
Pair 2	Mysticism Baby Angel	Kim Myung-hoon of Ulala Session	Don't Leave Me (날 떠나지마)	Park Jin-young	72
Round 3
Finalists	Regional Defense Corps Desertman	Jung Seung-hwan	Cannot Have You (가질 수 없는 너)	Bank	31
Finalists	Mysticism Baby Angel	Kim Myung-hoon of Ulala Session	Please Find Her (그녀를 찾아주세요)	The Name	68
Final
Battle	Mysticism Baby Angel	Kim Myung-hoon of Ulala Session	Previous three songs used as voting standard		57
Battle	Warm Heart Robot	Shin Yong-jae of 4Men	One Candle (촛불 하나)	g.o.d	42

=== 47th Generation Mask King ===
- Contestants : Lee Yong-sik, Seol Woon-do, Suran, Park Hye-soo, Youngjae (Got7), Thunder, Jang Do-yeon, Hwanhee (Fly to the Sky)
Episodes 93 – 94

Episode 93

Episode 93 was broadcast on January 8, 2017. This marks the beginning of the Forty-seventh Generation.

Order	Stage Name	Real Name	Song	Original artist	Vote
Round 1
Pair 1	Black-bean-sauce Noodles Jajangmyeon	Lee Yong-sik	Please Stay with Me Forever (영원히 내게)	Ahn Sang-soo	40
Pair 1	Spicy Seafood Noodle Soup Jjamppong	Seol Woon-do	Please Stay with Me Forever (영원히 내게)	Ahn Sang-soo	59
2nd Song	Black-bean-sauce Noodles Jajangmyeon	Lee Yong-sik	Cafe of the Winter (그 겨울의 찻집)	Cho Yong-pil	–
Pair 2	Skip to the End, Hello	Suran	Twinkle	Girls' Generation-TTS	58
Pair 2	Never-ending Merry-go-round	Park Hye-soo	Twinkle	Girls' Generation-TTS	41
2nd Song	Never-ending Merry-go-round	Park Hye-soo	Breathe (한숨)	Lee Hi	–
Pair 3	The King of Game Machine	Youngjae of Got7	Turn Back to Me (나를 돌아봐)	DEUX	54
Pair 3	Robot Mania	Thunder	Turn Back to Me (나를 돌아봐)	DEUX	45
2nd Song	Robot Mania	Thunder	Yesterday, Today, And (어제, 오늘, 그리고)	Cho Yong-pil	–
Pair 4	Pippi Longstocking	Jang Do-yeon	One Late Night in 1994 (1994년 어느 늦은 밤)	Jang Hye-jin	18
Pair 4	Hoppang Prince	Hwanhee of Fly to the Sky	One Late Night in 1994 (1994년 어느 늦은 밤)	Jang Hye-jin	81
2nd Song	Pippi Longstocking	Jang Do-yeon	Wind Please Stop Blowing (바람아 멈추어다오)	Lee Ji-yeon	–

Episode 94

Episode 94 was broadcast on January 15, 2017.

Order	Stage Name	Real Name	Song	Original artist	Vote
Round 2
Pair 1	Spicy Seafood Noodle Soup Jjamppong	Seol Woon-do	Nameless Girl (이름 모를 소녀)	Kim Jeong-ho	47
Pair 1	Skip to the End, Hello	Suran	I Have a Girlfriend (난 여자가 있는데)	Park Jin-young	52
Special	Spicy Seafood Noodle Soup Jjamppong	Seol Woon-do	My Love by My Side (내 사랑 내 곁에)	Kim Hyun-sik	–
Pair 2	The King of Game Machine	Youngjae of Got7	Passing (지나간다)	Kim Bum-soo	16
Pair 2	Hoppang Prince	Hwanhee of Fly to the Sky	Only Look at Me (나만 바라봐)	Taeyang	83
Round 3
Finalists	Skip to the End, Hello	Suran	Sad Fate (슬픈 인연)	Na-mi	29
Finalists	Hoppang Prince	Hwanhee of Fly to the Sky	Distant Memories of You (기억 속의 먼 그대에게)	Park Mi-kyung	70
Final
Battle	Hoppang Prince	Hwanhee of Fly to the Sky	Previous three songs used as voting standard		67
Battle	Mysticism Baby Angel	Kim Myung-hoon of Ulala Session	To You Again (너에게로 또 다시)	Byun Jin-sub	32

=== 48th Generation Mask King ===
- Contestants : U Sung-eun, Kim Se-jeong (I.O.I/Gugudan), Jo Jung-chi, Choi Min-soo, Lee Hyuk (Norazo), DinDin, Jiyai Shin, Seohyun (Girls' Generation)
Episodes 95 – 96

Episode 95

Episode 95 was broadcast on January 22, 2017. This marks the beginning of the Forty-eighth Generation.

Order	Stage Name	Real Name	Song	Original artist	Vote
Round 1
Pair 1	Party Queen Grasshopper	U Sung-eun	If I Leave (나 가거든)	Sumi Jo	54
Pair 1	Worker Holic Antgirl	Kim Se-jeong of I.O.I/Gugudan	If I Leave (나 가거든)	Sumi Jo	45
2nd Song	Worker Holic Antgirl	Kim Se-jeong of I.O.I/Gugudan	A Gust of Laughter (한바탕 웃음으로)	Lee Sun-hee	–
Pair 2	Tough Guy Cowboy	Jo Jung-chi	Toy Soldiers (장난감 병정)	Park Kang-sung	34
Pair 2	Charm Little Indian	Choi Min-soo	Toy Soldiers (장난감 병정)	Park Kang-sung	65
2nd Song	Tough Guy Cowboy	Jo Jung-chi	Yealulala (예럴랄라)	Kang San-ae	–
Pair 3	2017! Only The Flower Road	Lee Hyuk of Norazo	Expressing Affections (애정표현)	Flower	56
Pair 3	Bitter Shine and Your Story	DinDin	Expressing Affections (애정표현)	Flower	43
2nd Song	Bitter Shine and Your Story	DinDin	That I Was Once by Your Side (내가 너의 곁에 잠시 살았다는 걸)	Toy	–
Pair 4	Happy New Year's Card	Jiyai Shin	Goodbye (안녕)	Park Hye-kyung	29
Pair 4	New Year New Bride Cackle	Seohyun of Girls' Generation	Goodbye (안녕)	Park Hye-kyung	70
2nd Song	Happy New Year's Card	Jiyai Shin	When Love Passes (사랑이 지나가면)	Lee Moon-se	–

Episode 96

Episode 96 was broadcast on January 29, 2017.

Order	Stage Name	Real Name	Song	Original artist	Vote
Round 2
Pair 1	Party Queen Grasshopper	U Sung-eun	Adult Ceremony (성인식)	Park Ji-yoon	59
Pair 1	Charm Little Indian	Choi Min-soo	That's Only My World (그것만이 내 세상)	Deulgukhwa	40
Pair 2	2017! Only The Flower Road	Lee Hyuk of Norazo	Half of My Life (내 삶의 반)	Han Kyung-il	57
Pair 2	New Year New Bride Cackle	Seohyun of Girls' Generation	You're the Best (넌 is 뭔들)	Mamamoo	42
3rd Song	New Year New Bride Cackle	Seohyun of Girls' Generation	My Strongest Suit (Korean version)	Musical Aida OST	–
Round 3
Finalists	Party Queen Grasshopper	U Sung-eun	About Romance (낭만에 대하여)	Choi Baek-ho	41
Finalists	2017! Only The Flower Road	Lee Hyuk of Norazo	Rain and Loneliness (비와 외로움)	Wind Flower (바람꽃)	58
Final
Battle	2017! Only The Flower Road	Lee Hyuk of Norazo	Previous three songs used as voting standard		37
Battle	Hoppang Prince	Hwanhee of Fly to the Sky	Don't Forget (잊지말아요)	Baek Ji-young	62

=== 49th Generation Mask King ===
- Contestants : Lee Yi-kyung, Shin Yoo, Son Jun-ho, Mithra Jin (Epik High), Kim Mi-ryeo, Hyojung (Oh My Girl), Heo Cham, DK (December)
Episodes 97 – 98

Episode 97

Episode 97 was broadcast on February 5, 2017. This marks the beginning of the Forty-ninth Generation.

Order	Stage Name	Real Name	Song	Original artist	Vote
Round 1
Pair 1	A Gentleman in Rome, Gregory Peck	Lee Yi-kyung	This Song (이 노래)	2AM	33
Pair 1	Hollywood Rebel, James Dean	Shin Yoo	This Song (이 노래)	2AM	66
2nd Song	A Gentleman in Rome, Gregory Peck	Lee Yi-kyung	A Certain Longing (어떤 그리움)	Lee Eun-mi	–
Pair 2	A God of Thunderstorm, Thor	Son Jun-ho	Moon of Seoul (서울의 달)	Kim Gun-mo	52
Pair 2	A God of the Sea, Poseidon	Mithra Jin of Epik High	Moon of Seoul (서울의 달)	Kim Gun-mo	47
2nd Song	A God of the Sea, Poseidon	Mithra Jin of Epik High	After Send You (너를 보내고)	YB	–
Pair 3	That's Ridiculous! Gold Stars	Kim Mi-ryeo	Décalcomanie (데칼코마니)	Mamamoo	45
Pair 3	Played in the Itaewon, Moon	Hyojung of Oh My Girl	Décalcomanie (데칼코마니)	Mamamoo	54
2nd Song	That's Ridiculous! Gold Stars	Kim Mi-ryeo	I Will Show You (보여줄게)	Ailee	–
Pair 4	Fart Boss, Skunk	Heo Cham	The Night Like Today (오늘 같은 밤)	Lee Kwang-jo	29
Pair 4	More Beautiful Than Flowers, Deer	DK of December	The Night Like Today (오늘 같은 밤)	Lee Kwang-jo	70
2nd Song	Fart Boss, Skunk	Heo Cham	Letter (편지)	Onions (어니언스)	–

Episode 98

Episode 98 was broadcast on February 12, 2017.

Order	Stage Name	Real Name	Song	Original artist	Vote
Round 2
Pair 1	Hollywood Rebel, James Dean	Shin Yoo	Confession (고백)	4Men	38
Pair 1	A God of Thunderstorm, Thor	Son Jun-ho	A Flying Butterfly (나는 나비)	YB	61
Pair 2	Played in the Itaewon, Moon	Hyojung of Oh My Girl	Hui Jae (희재)	Sung Si-kyung	30
Pair 2	More Beautiful Than Flowers, Deer	DK of December	You Are Tearful (그대는 눈물겹다)	M.C the Max	69
Round 3
Finalists	A God of Thunderstorm, Thor	Son Jun-ho	The Impossible Dream (Korean version) (이룰 수 없는 꿈)	Musical Man of La Mancha OST	43
Finalists	More Beautiful Than Flowers, Deer	DK of December	From the Sun to the Boy (해에게서 소년에게)	N.EX.T	56
Final
Battle	More Beautiful Than Flowers, Deer	DK of December	Previous three songs used as voting standard		29
Battle	Hoppang Prince	Hwanhee of Fly to the Sky	Love Song (널 붙잡을 노래)	Rain	70

=== 50th Generation Mask King ===
- Contestants : Shindong (Super Junior), Bonggu (Gilgu Bonggu), Park Sang-min, Kim Seung-hyun, Lee Su-hyun (AKMU), Lee Chan-hyuk (AKMU), Im Ye-jin, Jang Hee-young
Episodes 99 – 100

Episode 99

Episode 99 was broadcast on February 19, 2017. This marks the beginning of the Fiftieth Generation.

Order	Stage Name	Real Name	Song	Original artist	Vote
Round 1
Pair 1	Apgujeong Orange Tribe	Shindong of Super Junior	Beautiful Night (아름다운 밤)	Ulala Session	41
Pair 1	Gangnam Swallow	Bonggu of Gilgu Bonggu	Beautiful Night (아름다운 밤)	Ulala Session	58
2nd Song	Apgujeong Orange Tribe	Shindong of Super Junior	Foolish Love (미련한 사랑)	JK Kim Dong-wook	–
Pair 2	Are You Mask King, Jenga?	Park Sang-min	White Winter (하얀 겨울)	Mr. 2	74
Pair 2	Revolve Around the Earth Land Owner	Kim Seung-hyun	White Winter (하얀 겨울)	Mr. 2	25
2nd Song	Revolve Around the Earth Land Owner	Kim Seung-hyun	Even Loved the Pain (그 아픔까지 사랑한거야)	Jo Jeong-hyun	–
Pair 3	Elephant Young Girl Is Nose-handed	Lee Soo-hyun of AKMU	Round and Round (빙글빙글)	Na-mi	64
Pair 3	Short Neck Sad Giraffe	Lee Chan-hyuk of AKMU	Round and Round (빙글빙글)	Na-mi	35
2nd Song	Short Neck Sad Giraffe	Lee Chan-hyuk of AKMU	A Little Girl (소녀)	Lee Moon-se	–
Pair 4	The Goal Is Marriage Report Juliet	Im Ye-jin	I Don't Know Yet (난 아직 모르잖아요)	Lee Moon-se	19
Pair 4	Girl with a Pearl Earring	Jang Hee-young	I Don't Know Yet (난 아직 모르잖아요)	Lee Moon-se	80
2nd Song	The Goal Is Marriage Report Juliet	Im Ye-jin	Long Lost Memories Loom Beyond the Window (창문너머 어렴풋이 옛 생각이 나겠지요)	Sanulrim	–

Episode 100

Episode 100 was broadcast on February 26, 2017.

Order	Stage Name	Real Name	Song	Original artist	Vote
Round 2
Pair 1	Gangnam Swallow	Bonggu of Gilgu Bonggu	Place Where You Need to Be (니가 있어야 할 곳)	g.o.d	64
Pair 1	Are You Mask King, Jenga?	Park Sang-min	Love Is Over	Jo Jang-hyuk	35
3rd Song	Are You Mask King, Jenga?	Park Sang-min	If You	Big Bang	–
Pair 2	Elephant Young Girl Is Nose-handed	Lee Soo-hyun of AKMU	First Impression (첫 인상)	Kim Gun-mo	42
Pair 2	Girl with a Pearl Earring	Jang Hee-young	Go Away	2NE1	57
Round 3
Finalists	Gangnam Swallow	Bonggu of Gilgu Bonggu	I Hate You (미워요)	Choi Jung-in	56
Finalists	Girl with a Pearl Earring	Jang Hee-young	Stained (물들어)	BMK	43
Final
Battle	Gangnam Swallow	Bonggu of Gilgu Bonggu	Previous three songs used as voting standard		66
Battle	Hoppang Prince	Hwanhee of Fly to the Sky	Heartbreaker	G-Dragon	33

=== 51st Generation Mask King ===
- Contestants : Lee Jong-hyun (CNBLUE), N (VIXX), Lina (The Grace), Kim Jae-kyung (Rainbow), Park Sung-kwang, Kim Beop-rae, Lee Hae-ri (Davichi), Lee Bon
Episodes 101 – 102

Episode 101

Episode 101 was broadcast on March 5, 2017. This marks the beginning of the Fifty-first Generation.

Order	Stage Name	Real Name	Song	Original artist	Vote
Round 1
Pair 1	All Together Cube One Wheel	Lee Jong-hyun of CNBLUE	I Want to Fall in Love (사랑에 빠지고 싶다)	Kim Jo-han	51
Pair 1	Got My Favorite Dartman	N of VIXX	I Want to Fall in Love (사랑에 빠지고 싶다)	Kim Jo-han	48
2nd Song	Got My Favorite Dartman	N of VIXX	Tearful (암연)	Go Han-woo	–
Pair 2	Ballerina Created by Ballet	Lina of The Grace	Happy Birthday to You	Kwon Jin-won	62
Pair 2	A Monstrous Net	Kim Jae-kyung of Rainbow	Happy Birthday to You	Kwon Jin-won	37
2nd Song	A Monstrous Net	Kim Jae-kyung of Rainbow	Late Regret (늦은 후회)	Bobo	–
Pair 3	Phil Full of Flute Boy	Park Sung-kwang	Love...That Person (사랑.. 그 놈)	Bobby Kim	9
Pair 3	Akodieonmaen, Don't Make Face	Kim Beop-rae	Love...That Person (사랑.. 그 놈)	Bobby Kim	90
2nd Song	Phil Full of Flute Boy	Park Sung-kwang	A Farewell to Arms (무기여 잘 있거라)	Park Sang-min	–
Pair 4	Puss in Boots is Sing	Lee Hae-ri of Davichi	Unpredictable Life (알 수 없는 세상)	Lee Moon-se	71
Pair 4	Hot Pink Panda From Head to Toe	Lee Bon	Unpredictable Life (알 수 없는 세상)	Lee Moon-se	28
2nd Song	Hot Pink Panda From Head to Toe	Lee Bon	Fix My Makeup (화장을 고치고)	Wax	–

Episode 102

Episode 102 was broadcast on March 12, 2017. The second half of this episode wasn't aired since 17:45 (KST) due to live broadcast about the former president Park Geun-hye's departure from the Blue House after her impeachment on March 10, 2017. The rest of this episode was broadcast on March 19, 2017 at 16:50 (KST), before the new episode 103.

Order	Stage Name	Real Name	Song	Original artist	Vote
Round 2
Pair 1	All Together Cube One Wheel	Lee Jong-hyun of CNBLUE	I Love You	The Position (Im Jae-wook)	30
Pair 1	Ballerina Created by Ballet	Lina of The Grace	Maria	Kim Ah-joong	69
Pair 2	Akodieonmaen, Don't Make Face	Kim Beop-rae	This Is the Moment (Korean version) (지금 이 순간)	Musical Jekyll and Hyde OST	34
Pair 2	Puss in Boots is Sing	Lee Hae-ri of Davichi	You in the Same Time (같은 시간 속의 너)	Naul	65
Round 3
Finalists	Ballerina Created by Ballet	Lina of The Grace	Last Love (마지막 사랑)	Park Ki-young	24
Finalists	Puss in Boots is Sing	Lee Hae-ri of Davichi	Making a New Ending for This Story (이 소설의 끝을 다시 써 보려 해)	Han Dong-geun	75
Final
Battle	Puss in Boots is Sing	Lee Hae-ri of Davichi	Previous three songs used as voting standard		53
Battle	Gangnam Swallow	Bonggu of Gilgu Bonggu	Beautiful	Crush	46

=== 52nd Generation Mask King ===
- Contestants : Hwangbo (Chakra), On Joo-wan, Lisa, J-Min, Rosé (Blackpink), Im Byung-soo, Go Ah-sung, Goo Ja-myung
Episodes 103 – 104

Episode 103

Episode 103 was broadcast on March 19, 2017 at 18:10 (KST), into the time frame of Secretly Greatly. This marks the beginning of the Fifty-second Generation.

Order	Stage Name	Real Name	Song	Original artist	Vote
Round 1
Pair 1	Doctor Fish, a Complete Cure Fairy	Hwangbo of Chakra	Like Rain, Like Music (비처럼 음악처럼)	Kim Hyun-sik	41
Pair 1	Young Master, Shows a Bitter Taste	On Joo-wan	Like Rain, Like Music (비처럼 음악처럼)	Kim Hyun-sik	58
2nd Song	Doctor Fish, a Complete Cure Fairy	Hwangbo of Chakra	Violet Fragrance (보랏빛 향기)	Kang Susie	–
Pair 2	Miss Korea 2017 Azalea	Lisa	Beautiful Country (아름다운 강산)	Lee Sun-hee	57
Pair 2	I Am Forsythia	J-Min	Beautiful Country (아름다운 강산)	Lee Sun-hee	42
2nd Song	I Am Forsythia	J-Min	Spring Past (봄날은 간다)	Kim Yoon-ah	–
Pair 3	Circus Girl to Juggle With Vocal Cords	Rosé of Blackpink	Livin' la Vida Loca	Ricky Martin	58
Pair 3	I Am Buying When I Become a King of Mask Singer	Im Byung-soo	Livin' la Vida Loca	Ricky Martin	41
2nd Song	I Am Buying When I Become a King of Mask Singer	Im Byung-soo	The Woman Outside the Window (창밖의 여자)	Cho Yong-pil	–
Pair 4	The Girl Who Like Baseball	Go Ah-sung	I'm Loneliness You're Longing (나는 외로움 그대는 그리움)	Park Young-mi	35
Pair 4	Kim Tak-gu, a Song Linguist	Goo Ja-myung	I'm Loneliness You're Longing (나는 외로움 그대는 그리움)	Park Young-mi	64
2nd Song	The Girl Who Like Baseball	Go Ah-sung	After Leaving Friendship (님 떠난 후)	Jang Deok	–

Episode 104

Episode 104 was broadcast on March 26, 2017.

Order	Stage Name	Real Name	Song	Original artist	Vote
Round 2
Pair 1	Young Master, Shows a Bitter Taste	On Joo-wan	You Don't Know Man (남자를 몰라)	Buzz	32
Pair 1	Miss Korea 2017 Azalea	Lisa	With Me	Wheesung	67
Pair 2	Circus Girl to Juggle With Vocal Cords	Rosé of Blackpink	If It Is You (Another Miss Oh OST) (너였다면)	Jung Seung-hwan	29
Pair 2	Kim Tak-gu, a Song Linguist	Goo Ja-myung	Peppermint Candy (박하사탕)	YB	70
Round 3
Finalists	Miss Korea 2017 Azalea	Lisa	Father (아버지)	Insooni	35
Finalists	Kim Tak-gu, a Song Linguist	Goo Ja-myung	Love over Thousand Years (천년의 사랑)	Park Wan-kyu	64
Final
Battle	Kim Tak-gu, a Song Linguist	Goo Ja-myung	Previous three songs used as voting standard		49
Battle	Puss in Boots is Sing	Lee Hae-ri of Davichi	Snow Flower (눈의 꽃)	Park Hyo-shin	50

=== 53rd Generation Mask King ===
- Contestants : Moon Se-yoon, Lee Hong-gi (F.T. Island), Shim Eun-jin (Baby Vox), Bae In-hyuk (Romantic Punch), Lee Sang-woo, Seo Kyung-seok, Sohyang, Minzy (2NE1)
Episodes 105 – 106

Episode 105

Episode 105 was broadcast on April 2, 2017. This marks the beginning of the Fifty-third Generation.

Order	Stage Name	Real Name	Song	Original artist	Vote
Opening	Freddie Mercury	Kim Yeon-woo (CBR Cleopatra)	Bohemian Rhapsody (Guitarist: Kim Do-kyun)	Queen	–
Round 1
Pair 1	Hong Gil Dong	Moon Se-yoon	Should I Say I Love You Again? (다시 사랑한다 말할까)	Kim Dong-ryul	34
Pair 1	Lupin the Phantom Thief	Lee Hong-gi of F.T. Island	Should I Say I Love You Again? (다시 사랑한다 말할까)	Kim Dong-ryul	65
2nd Song	Hong Gil Dong	Moon Se-yoon	Like the First Feeling (처음 느낌 그대로)	Lee So-ra	–
Pair 2	Sheep, Live Confidently	Shim Eun-jin of Baby Vox	HaHaHa Song (하하하쏭)	Jaurim	38
Pair 2	Mok-dong, Yangcheon-gu, the Shepherd Boy	Bae In-hyuk of Romantic Punch	HaHaHa Song (하하하쏭)	Jaurim	61
2nd Song	Sheep, Live Confidently	Shim Eun-jin of Baby Vox	Rain in Glass Window (유리창엔 비)	The Sunlight Village (햇빛촌)	–
Pair 3	Party King	Lee Sang-woo	Let's Go Travel (여행을 떠나요)	Cho Yong-pil	66
Pair 3	Prepayment Later Start Garland Man	Seo Kyung-seok	Let's Go Travel (여행을 떠나요)	Cho Yong-pil	33
2nd Song	Prepayment Later Start Garland Man	Seo Kyung-seok	Reminiscence (회상)	Sanulrim	–
Pair 4	9 Songs, Mood Maker	Sohyang	I Miss You (보고 싶다)	Kim Bum-soo	58
Pair 4	A Richly-toned Perilla Leaf Girl	Minzy of 2NE1	I Miss You (보고 싶다)	Kim Bum-soo	41
2nd Song	A Richly-toned Perilla Leaf Girl	Minzy of 2NE1	Sick and Sick Name (아프고 아픈 이름...)	Ann	–

Episode 106

Episode 106 was broadcast on April 9, 2017.

Order	Stage Name	Real Name	Song	Original artist	Vote
Round 2
Pair 1	Lupin the Phantom Thief	Lee Hong-gi of F.T. Island	The Sky in the West (서쪽 하늘)	Lee Seung-chul	45
Pair 1	Mok-dong, Yangcheon-gu, the Shepherd Boy	Bae In-hyuk of Romantic Punch	Turn on the Radio Loudly (크게 라디오를 켜고)	Sinawe	54
Pair 2	Party King	Lee Sang-woo	My Own Grief (나만의 슬픔)	Kim Don-kyoo	39
Pair 2	9 Songs, Mood Maker	Sohyang	Atlantis Princess (아틀란티스 소녀)	BoA	60
Round 3
Finalists	Mok-dong, Yangcheon-gu, the Shepherd Boy	Bae In-hyuk of Romantic Punch	Lady at the Cigarette Shop (담배 가게 아가씨)	Song Chang-sik	25
Finalists	9 Songs, Mood Maker	Sohyang	Dear Love (사랑아)	The One	74
Final
Battle	9 Songs, Mood Maker	Sohyang	Previous three songs used as voting standard		58
Battle	Puss in Boots is Sing	Lee Hae-ri of Davichi	A Shot of Soju (소주 한 잔)	Im Chang-jung	41

=== 54th Generation Mask King ===
- Contestants : Yoo Jae-hwan, Kei (Lovelyz), Zhang Yu'an, Min Young-gi, Yoon Seok-hwa, Min Do-hee, Park Seon-joo, Kang Leo
Episodes 107 – 108

Episode 107

Episode 107 was broadcast on April 16, 2017. This marks the beginning of the Fifty-fourth Generation.

Order	Stage Name	Real Name	Song	Original artist	Vote
Round 1
Pair 1	Naughty Cat Tom	Yoo Jae-hwan	You're to Me And I'm to You (The Classic OST) (너에게 난 나에게 넌)	Jatanpung	29
Pair 1	Agiley Mouse Jerry	Kei of Lovelyz	You're to Me And I'm to You (The Classic OST) (너에게 난 나에게 넌)	Jatanpung	70
2nd Song	Naughty Cat Tom	Yoo Jae-hwan	Love, At First (처음엔 사랑이란게)	Busker Busker	–
Pair 2	New Recruits	Zhang Yu'an	Blissful Confession (황홀한 고백)	Yoon Soo-il	32
Pair 2	Uncle Is Boss Chute Man	Min Young-gi	Blissful Confession (황홀한 고백)	Yoon Soo-il	67
2nd Song	New Recruits	Zhang Yu'an	After the Love Has Gone (사랑한 후에)	Leon Lai	–
Pair 3	Holiday in Rome Audrey Hepburn	Yoon Seok-hwa	No More Love Like This (그런 사람 또 없습니다)	Lee Seung-chul	52
Pair 3	I'm Not a Girl Anymore. Matilda	Min Do-hee	No More Love Like This (그런 사람 또 없습니다)	Lee Seung-chul	47
2nd Song	I'm Not a Girl Anymore. Matilda	Min Do-hee	The Pierrot Laughs at Us (삐에로는 우릴 보고 웃지)	Kim Wan-sun	–
Pair 4	If You Listen to My Song, Banana	Park Seon-joo	Because I Love You (사랑하기 때문에)	Yoo Jae-ha	78
Pair 4	Jeju Island Delinquent Stone Grandpa	Kang Leo	Because I Love You (사랑하기 때문에)	Yoo Jae-ha	21
2nd Song	Jeju Island Delinquent Stone Grandpa	Kang Leo	Prelude (서시)	Shin Sung-woo	–

Episode 108

Episode 108 was broadcast on April 23, 2017.

Order	Stage Name	Real Name	Song	Original artist	Vote
Round 2
Pair 1	Agiley Mouse Jerry	Kei of Lovelyz	You and I (너랑 나)	IU	37
Pair 1	Uncle Is Boss Chute Man	Min Young-gi	The Flower That Could Not Blossom (못다핀 꽃 한송이)	Kim Soo-chul	62
Pair 2	Holiday in Rome Audrey Hepburn	Yoon Seok-hwa	If (만약에)	Taeyeon	24
Pair 2	If You Listen to My Song, Banana	Park Seon-joo	Bad Girl Good Girl	Miss A	75
Special	Holiday in Rome Audrey Hepburn	Yoon Seok-hwa	Passionate Love (열애)	Yoon Shi-nae	–
Round 3
Finalists	Uncle Is Boss Chute Man	Min Young-gi	If I Leave (나 가거든)	Sumi Jo	47
Finalists	If You Listen to My Song, Banana	Park Seon-joo	I Hope It Would Be That Way Now (이젠 그랬으면 좋겠네)	Cho Yong-pil	52
Final
Battle	If You Listen to My Song, Banana	Park Seon-joo	Previous three songs used as voting standard		33
Battle	9 Songs, Mood Maker	Sohyang	Do You Know (아시나요)	Jo Sung-mo	66

=== 55th Generation Mask King ===
- Contestants : Junggigo, Kang Seung-yoon (Winner), Shin Bo-ra, Ahn Shin-ae (The Barberettes), Lee Se-joon (Yurisangja), Choi Sung-jo, Lee Se-young, Jamie (15&)
Episodes 109 – 110

Episode 109

Episode 109 was broadcast on April 30, 2017. This marks the beginning of the Fifty-fifth Generation.

Order	Stage Name	Real Name	Song	Original artist	Vote
Round 1
Pair 1	The Song of Destiny Teller	Junggigo	Wi Ing Wi Ing (위잉위잉)	Hyukoh	53
Pair 1	Excuse Me, Fan Ascetic	Kang Seung-yoon of Winner	Wi Ing Wi Ing (위잉위잉)	Hyukoh	46
2nd Song	Excuse Me, Fan Ascetic	Kang Seung-yoon of Winner	Baby Baby	4Men	–
Pair 2	Jebudo Island Sea Goddess	Shin Bo-ra	You in My Faded Memories (흐린 기억 속의 그대)	Hyun Jin-young	41
Pair 2	My Name Is Kimppangsun	Ahn Shin-ae of The Barberettes	You in My Faded Memories (흐린 기억 속의 그대)	Hyun Jin-young	58
2nd Song	Jebudo Island Sea Goddess	Shin Bo-ra	As You Live (살다 보면)	Cha Ji-yeon	–
Pair 3	Devoted Singer Carnation Man	Lee Se-joon of Yurisangja	Feeling Only You (너만을 느끼며)	The Blue	70
Pair 3	Children's Day on May 5 a Toy Boy	Choi Sung-jo	Feeling Only You (너만을 느끼며)	The Blue	29
2nd Song	Children's Day on May 5 a Toy Boy	Choi Sung-jo	Instinctively (본능적으로)	Yoon Jong-shin	–
Pair 4	Kisses It's Nice to Meet Kissing Gourami	Lee Se-young	Waiting (기다리다)	Younha	37
Pair 4	Listen to My Song and Applaud It Baby Seal	Park Ji-min of 15&	Waiting (기다리다)	Younha	62
2nd Song	Kisses It's Nice to Meet Kissing Gourami	Lee Se-young	Sweet Heart (오빠야)	Seenroot	–

Episode 110

Episode 110 was broadcast on May 7, 2017.

Order	Stage Name	Real Name	Song	Original artist	Vote
Round 2
Pair 1	The Song of Destiny Teller	Junggigo	Malri Flower (말리꽃)	Lee Seung-chul	31
Pair 1	My Name Is Kimppangsun	Ahn Shin-ae of The Barberettes	The Man of the Past (그때 그 사람)	Sim Soo-bong	68
Pair 2	Devoted Singer Carnation Man	Lee Se-joon of Yurisangja	Forbidden Love (금지된 사랑)	Kim Kyung-ho	62
Pair 2	Listen to My Song and Applaud It Baby Seal	Park Ji-min of 15&	Memory of the Wind (바람기억)	Naul	37
Round 3
Finalists	My Name Is Kimppangsun	Ahn Shin-ae of The Barberettes	For You (너를 위해)	Yim Jae-beom	36
Finalists	Devoted Singer Carnation Man	Lee Se-joon of Yurisangja	A Thousand Days (천 일 동안)	Lee Seung-hwan	63
Final
Battle	Devoted Singer Carnation Man	Lee Se-joon of Yurisangja	Previous three songs used as voting standard		22
Battle	9 Songs, Mood Maker	Sohyang	Hug Me (안아줘)	Jung Joon-il	77

=== 56th Generation Mask King ===
- Contestants : Lee Ye-joon, Kim Hyo-jin, Hwasa (Mamamoo), Yezi (Fiestar), Shin Dong-wook, Go Jae-geun (Y2K), Jung Hye-sung, Hwang Chi-yeul
Episodes 111 – 112

Episode 111

Episode 111 was broadcast on May 14, 2017. This marks the beginning of the Fifty-sixth Generation.

Order	Stage Name	Real Name	Song	Original artist	Vote
Round 1
Pair 1	Don't Be Dazzled by Patterns! Ladybug	Lee Ye-joon	Passion (열정)	Hyeeunyee	71
Pair 1	A Voice Singing a Song!Tulip Girl	Kim Hyo-jin	Passion (열정)	Hyeeunyee	28
2nd Song	A Voice Singing a Song!Tulip Girl	Kim Hyo-jin	D.D.D (디.디.디.)	Kim Hye-rim	–
Pair 2	Follow Me Aerobics Girl	Hwasa of Mamamoo	Bang Bang Bang (뱅뱅뱅)	BigBang	52
Pair 2	Tango Girl	Yezi of Fiestar	Bang Bang Bang (뱅뱅뱅)	BigBang	47
2nd Song	Tango Girl	Yezi of Fiestar	I Love You Even Though I Hate You (미워도 사랑하니까)	Davichi	–
Pair 3	Vacuum Cleaner	Shin Dong-wook	Will You Marry Me? (결혼해 줄래)	Lee Seung-gi	34
Pair 3	Janus Vocal! God of the Bath	Go Jae-geun of Y2K	Will You Marry Me? (결혼해 줄래)	Lee Seung-gi	65
2nd Song	Vacuum Cleaner	Shin Dong-wook	When You Are... (너 그럴때면...)	Eve	–
Pair 4	Eagle Brother Adjutant Bird	Jung Hye-sung	Miracle (기적)	Kim Dong-ryul & Lee So-eun	29
Pair 4	Kang Baekho	Hwang Chi-yeul	Miracle (기적)	Kim Dong-ryul & Lee So-eun	70
2nd Song	Eagle Brother Adjutant Bird	Jung Hye-sung	Farewell Taxi (이별택시)	Kim Yeon-woo	–

Episode 112

Episode 112 was broadcast on May 21, 2017.

Order	Stage Name	Real Name	Song	Original artist	Vote
Round 2
Pair 1	Don't Be Dazzled by Patterns! Ladybug	Lee Ye-joon	Lean On (빌려줄게)	Shin Yong-jae	58
Pair 1	Follow Me Aerobics Girl	Hwasa of Mamamoo	Is Anyone There? (누구 없소)	Han Young-ae	41
Pair 2	Janus Vocal! God of the Bath	Go Jae-geun of Y2K	I Have Chosen the Way (내가 선택한 길)	Son Sung-hoon	23
Pair 2	Kang Baekho	Hwang Chi-yeul	Kiss Me	Park Jin-young	76
Round 3
Finalists	Don't Be Dazzled by Patterns! Ladybug	Lee Ye-joon	All You Need is Love (사미인곡)	Seomoon Tak	31
Finalists	Kang Baekho	Hwang Chi-yeul	Amazing You (그대라는 사치)	Han Dong-geun	68
Final
Battle	Kang Baekho	Hwang Chi-yeul	Previous three songs used as voting standard		32
Battle	9 Songs, Mood Maker	Sohyang	Mona Lisa (모나리자)	Cho Yong-pil	67

=== 57th Generation Mask King ===
- Contestants : Jung Soo-young, Whale, Choi Jung-won (UN), Gilme (Clover), Eddy Kim, Lim Eun-kyung, Park Hye-na, Baek In-tae (Duetto)
Episodes 113 – 114

Episode 113

Episode 113 was broadcast on May 28, 2017. This marks the beginning of the Fifty-seventh Generation.

Order	Stage Name	Real Name	Song	Original artist	Vote
Round 1
Pair 1	Rapunzel	Jung Soo-young	Sorry, I Hate You (미안해 널 미워해)	Jaurim	37
Pair 1	Clench One's Fist 'Pocahontas'	Whale	Sorry, I Hate You (미안해 널 미워해)	Jaurim	62
2nd Song	Rapunzel	Jung Soo-young	Flying Duck (오리 날다)	Cherry Filter	–
Pair 2	Picked My Car 'Camping Car'	Choi Jung-won of UN	One More Step (한 걸음 더)	Yoon Sang	35
Pair 2	Internet Shopping Mania, Surfing Girl	GilMe of Clover	One More Step (한 걸음 더)	Yoon Sang	64
2nd Song	Picked My Car 'Camping Car'	Choi Jung-won of UN	Lie Lie Lie (거짓말 거짓말 거짓말)	Lee Juck	–
Pair 3	The Prince Trumpets the Crown of the Crown	Eddy Kim	Fox (여우야)	The Classic	71
Pair 3	Let's Take a Break 'Half Time'	Lim Eun-kyung	Fox (여우야)	The Classic	28
2nd Song	Let's Take a Break 'Half Time'	Lim Eun-kyung	Introduce Me a Good Person (좋은 사람 있으면 소개시켜 줘)	Basis	–
Pair 4	The Master of Transformation 'Raccoon'	Park Hye-na	The Prayer	Andrea Bocelli & Celine Dion	50
Pair 4	Brindled Cow	Baek In-tae of Duetto	The Prayer	Andrea Bocelli & Celine Dion	49
2nd Song	Brindled Cow	Baek In-tae of Duetto	Running in the Sky (하늘을 달리다)	Lee Juck	–

Episode 114

Episode 114 was broadcast on June 4, 2017.

Order	Stage Name	Real Name	Song	Original artist	Vote
Round 2
Pair 1	Clench One's Fist 'Pocahontas'	Whale	1.2.3.4 (원,투,쓰리,포)	Lee Hi	42
Pair 1	Internet Shopping Mania, Surfing Girl	GilMe of Clover	You're the Best (넌 is 뭔들)	Mamamoo	57
Pair 2	The Prince Trumpets the Crown of the Crown	Eddy Kim	Only the Sound of Her Laughter (그녀의 웃음소리뿐)	Lee Moon-sae	38
Pair 2	The Master of Transformation 'Raccoon'	Park Hye-na	Twinkle	Girls' Generation-TTS	61
Round 3
Finalists	Internet Shopping Mania, Surfing Girl	GilMe of Clover	Love, Never Fade (사랑, 결코 시들지 않는)	Seomoon Tak	25
Finalists	The Master of Transformation 'Raccoon'	Park Hye-na	Then Something (그런 일은)	Hwayobi	74
Final
Battle	The Master of Transformation 'Raccoon'	Park Hye-na	Previous three songs used as voting standard		23
Battle	9 Songs, Mood Maker	Sohyang	Breathe (한숨)	Lee Hi	76

=== 58th Generation Mask King ===
- Contestants : Shannon, Kim Ji-sook (Rainbow), Henry (Super Junior-M), Sanchez (Phantom), Wi Yang-ho, Jung Chan-woo (Cultwo), Ryu Tae-joon, John Park
Episodes 115 – 116

Episode 115

Episode 115 was broadcast on June 11, 2017. This marks the beginning of the Fifty-eighth Generation.

Order	Stage Name	Real Name	Song	Original artist	Vote
Round 1
Pair 1	Best Actress Award for the Day Fennec Fox	Shannon	I Have a Lover (애인 있어요)	Lee Eun-mi	57
Pair 1	An Oasis in My Heart	Kim Ji-sook of Rainbow	I Have a Lover (애인 있어요)	Lee Eun-mi	42
2nd Song	An Oasis in My Heart	Kim Ji-sook of Rainbow	Cast a Spell (주문을 걸어)	Park Hye-kyung	–
Pair 2	Moonwalk White Jackson	Henry of Super Junior-M	Billie Jean	Michael Jackson	48
Pair 2	Heal the World Black Jackson	Sanchez of Phantom	Billie Jean	Michael Jackson	51
2nd Song	Moonwalk White Jackson	Henry of Super Junior-M	Because You're My Woman (내 여자라니까)	Lee Seung-gi	–
Pair 3	Song VIP Shopping King Sister	Wi Yang-ho	Spring, Summer, Autumn, Winter (봄 여름 가을 겨울)	Kim Hyun-sik	59
Pair 3	Please Don't Lie Down King Euija	Jung Chan-woo of Cultwo	Spring, Summer, Autumn, Winter (봄 여름 가을 겨울)	Kim Hyun-sik	40
2nd Song	Please Don't Lie Down King Euija	Jung Chan-woo of Cultwo	Dear My Lady (숙녀에게)	Byun Jin-sub	–
Pair 4	The Dream of The Seagull	Ryu Tae-joon	Very Old Couples (아주 오래된 연인들)	015B	36
Pair 4	Voice Blue Ocean Marine Boy	John Park	Very Old Couples (아주 오래된 연인들)	015B	63
2nd Song	The Dream of The Seagull	Ryu Tae-joon	Emergency (Wonderful Days OST) (비상)	Lee Seung-yeol	–

Episode 116

Episode 116 was broadcast on June 18, 2017.

Order	Stage Name	Real Name	Song	Original artist	Vote
Round 2
Pair 1	Best Actress Award for the Day Fennec Fox	Shannon	Stop the Time (시간아 멈춰라)	Davichi	35
Pair 1	Heal the World Black Jackson	Sanchez of Phantom	Nothing Better	Jungyup	64
Pair 2	Song VIP Shopping King Sister	Wi Yang-ho	You Can Do It (넌 할 수 있어)	Kang San-eh	19
Pair 2	Voice Blue Ocean Marine Boy	John Park	Just (그냥)	Zion.T & Crush	80
Round 3
Finalists	Heal the World Black Jackson	Sanchez of Phantom	Doll (인형)	Lee Ji-hoon & Shin Hye-sung	37
Finalists	Voice Blue Ocean Marine Boy	John Park	Replay	Kim Dong-ryul	62
Final
Battle	Voice Blue Ocean Marine Boy	John Park	Previous three songs used as voting standard		25
Battle	9 Songs, Mood Maker	Sohyang	Home	Park Hyo-shin	74

=== 59th Generation Mask King ===
- Contestants : Jang Jae-in, Soohyun (U-KISS), Kim Hwa-soo (T.△.S), Bobby (iKon), Kim Hye-yeon, Hong Rok-gi, Seo Min-jung, Johan Kim
Episodes 117 – 118

Episode 117

Episode 117 was broadcast on June 25, 2017. This marks the beginning of the Fifty-ninth Generation.

Order	Stage Name	Real Name	Song	Original artist	Vote
Round 1
Pair 1	Smurfette	Jang Jae-in	Please Summer! (여름아 부탁해)	Indigo (인디고)	42
Pair 1	Much Younger 'A Young, Smurfs'	Soohyun of U-KISS	Please Summer! (여름아 부탁해)	Indigo (인디고)	57
2nd Song	Smurfette	Jang Jae-in	The Woman in the Rain (빗속의 여인)	Shin Joong-hyun	–
Pair 2	Stingray	Kim Hwa-soo of T.△.S	It Must Have Been Love (사랑했나봐)	YB	58
Pair 2	Baby Octopus Prince	Bobby of iKON	It Must Have Been Love (사랑했나봐)	YB	41
2nd Song	Baby Octopus Prince	Bobby of iKON	Like Those Powerful Salmons That Come Against the River (거꾸로 강을 거슬러 오르는저 힘찬 연어들처럼)	Kang San-eh	–
Pair 3	Ulju-gun Onyang-eup Balinese Girl from Bali	Kim Hye-yeon	Love Is Leaving (사랑이 떠나가네)	Kim Gun-mo	64
Pair 3	Bukcheong Lion	Hong Rok-gi	Love Is Leaving (사랑이 떠나가네)	Kim Gun-mo	35
2nd Song	Bukcheong Lion	Hong Rok-gi	Kung Ddari Sha Bah Rah (꿍따리 샤바라)	CLON	–
Pair 4	Fried Potato	Seo Min-jung	Short Hair (단발머리)	Cho Yong-pil	16
Pair 4	0 Calories If You Taste MC Hamburger	Johan Kim	Short Hair (단발머리)	Cho Yong-pil	83
2nd Song	Fried Potato	Seo Min-jung	Red Bean Sherbet (팥빙수)	Yoon Jong-shin	–

Episode 118

Episode 118 was broadcast on July 2, 2017.

Order	Stage Name	Real Name	Song	Original artist	Vote
Round 2
Pair 1	Much Younger 'A Young, Smurfs'	Soohyun of U-KISS	Love Again (또 다시 사랑)	Im Chang-jung	41
Pair 1	Stingray	Kim Hwa-soo of T.△.S	Travel to Me (나에게로 떠나는 여행)	BUZZ	58
Pair 2	Ulju-gun Onyang-eup Balinese Girl from Bali	Kim Hye-yeon	Even If I Love You (너를 사랑하고도)	Jeon Yoo-na	32
Pair 2	0 Calories If You Taste MC Hamburger	Johan Kim	Missing You	Fly to the Sky	67
Round 3
Finalists	Stingray	Kim Hwa-soo of T.△.S	Requiem (진혼)	Yada	18
Finalists	0 Calories If You Taste MC Hamburger	Johan Kim	Don't Leave Me (날 떠나지마)	Park Jin-young	81
Final
Battle	0 Calories If You Taste MC Hamburger	Johan Kim	Previous three songs used as voting standard		56
Battle	9 Songs, Mood Maker	Sohyang	Day Day	BewhY ft. Jay Park	43

=== 60th Generation Mask King ===
- Contestants : Oh Ha-young (Apink), Ryan (Paran), Im Se-mi, Lee Hi, Junho (2PM), Park Ji-sun, K.Will, Park Jang-hyun (Vromance)
Episodes 119 – 120

Episode 119

Episode 119 was broadcast on July 9, 2017. This marks the beginning of the Sixtieth Generation.

Order	Stage Name	Real Name	Song	Original artist	Vote
Round 1
Pair 1	Help Me Popeye Olive Girl	Oh Ha-young of Apink	Breath (숨소리)	SM the Ballad (Taeyeon & Jonghyun)	37
Pair 1	Power Up Popeye Eating Spinach	Ryan of Paran	Breath (숨소리)	SM the Ballad (Taeyeon & Jonghyun)	62
2nd Song	Help Me Popeye Olive Girl	Oh Ha-young of Apink	I Don't Know Anything But Love (사랑밖엔 난 몰라)	Sim Soo-bong	–
Pair 2	Hawaii is a US Territory, Dokdo is Our Territory, Hula Girl	Im Se-mi	No One Can Stop Me (저 바다가 날 막겠어)	Sang A Im-Propp	29
Pair 2	Samba Samba Samba Samba Samba Girl	Lee Hi	No One Can Stop Me (저 바다가 날 막겠어)	Sang A Im-Propp	70
2nd Song	Hawaii is a US Territory, Dokdo is Our Territory, Hula Girl	Im Se-mi	Like a Bird (새들처럼)	Byun Jin-sub	–
Pair 3	Watermelon Friend Melon	Junho of 2PM	Cocktail Love (칵테일 사랑)	Marronnier	63
Pair 3	Peach, Can Not Peach, No Peach	Park Ji-sun	Cocktail Love (칵테일 사랑)	Marronnier	36
2nd Song	Peach Can Not Peach No Peach	Park Ji-sun	Ah-Choo	Lovelyz	–
Pair 4	The Sea Otter Baby Seahorse	K.Will	Sea of Love	Fly to the Sky	52
Pair 4	A Boy Drowning in My Song	Janghyun of VROMANCE	Sea of Love	Fly to the Sky	47
2nd Song	A Boy Drowning in My Song	Janghyun of VROMANCE	Oasis	Kim Kyung-ho	–

Episode 120

Episode 120 was broadcast on July 16, 2017.

Order	Stage Name	Real Name	Song	Original artist	Vote
Round 2
Pair 1	Power Up Popeye Eating Spinach	Ryan of Paran	After We Broke (사랑한후에)	Shin Sung-woo	52
Pair 1	Samba Samba Samba Samba Samba Girl	Lee Hi	My Name	BoA	47
Pair 2	Watermelon Friend Melon	Junho of 2PM	Rain and You (비와 당신)	Park Joong-hoon	31
Pair 2	The Sea Otter Baby Seahorse	K.Will	Baby Baby	4Men	68
Round 3
Finalists	Power Up Popeye Eating Spinach	Ryan of Paran	Ultramania (울트라맨이야)	Seo Taiji	23
Finalists	The Sea Otter Baby Seahorse	K.Will	When Flowering Spring Comes (꽃피는 봄이 오면)	BMK	76
Final
Battle	The Sea Otter Baby Seahorse	K.Will	Previous three songs used as voting standard		60
Battle	0 Calories If You Taste MC Hamburger	Johan Kim	Can't We (안 되나요)	Wheesung	39

=== 61st Generation Mask King ===
- Contestants : Lee So-eun, Moon Cheon-sik, Yang Taek-jo, Kim Hyung-seop, Joy (Red Velvet), Lee Hwan-hee (Up10tion), Ock Joo-hyun, Kim Seung-soo
Episodes 121 – 122

Episode 121

Episode 121 was broadcast on July 23, 2017. This marks the beginning of the Sixty-first Generation.

Order	Stage Name	Real Name	Song	Original artist	Vote
Round 1
Pair 1	Fruit Ice Flakes with Syrup	Lee So-eun	Good Person (좋은 사람)	Toy	64
Pair 1	Beach Umbrella	Moon Cheon-sik	Good Person (좋은 사람)	Toy	35
2nd Song	Beach Umbrella	Moon Cheon-sik	Endure (차마)	Sung Si-kyung	–
Pair 2	The Cute Pig	Yang Taek-jo	With Love (사랑으로)	Sunflower	30
Pair 2	Donkey	Kim Hyung-seop	With Love (사랑으로)	Sunflower	69
2nd Song	The Cute Pig	Yang Taek-jo	A Mung-bean Pancake Gentleman (빈대떡 신사)	Han Bok-nam	–
Pair 3	Bandabi	Joy of Red Velvet	Photograph (사진)	Kim Nam-joo & Yook Sung-jae	52
Pair 3	Soohorang	Hwanhee of UP10TION	Photograph (사진)	Kim Nam-joo & Yook Sung-jae	47
2nd Song	Soohorang	Hwanhee of UP10TION	You Wouldn't Answer My Calls (전활 받지 않는 너에게)	2AM	–
Pair 4	Yeonghui	Ock Joo-hyun	Everything Was You (전부 너였다)	Noel	61
Pair 4	Cheolsu	Kim Seung-soo	Everything Was You (전부 너였다)	Noel	38
2nd Song	Cheolsu	Kim Seung-soo	Love, That Common Word (사랑한다는 흔한 말)	Kim Yeon-woo	–

Episode 122

Episode 122 was broadcast on July 30, 2017.

Order	Stage Name	Real Name	Song	Original artist	Vote
Round 2
Pair 1	Fruit Ice Flakes with Syrup	Lee So-eun	Proposal (청혼)	Noel	54
Pair 1	Donkey	Kim Hyung-seop	Wind that Blows (그대가 분다)	M.C the Max	45
Pair 2	Bandabi	Joy of Red Velvet	Just in Love (꿈을 모아서)	S.E.S.	26
Pair 2	Yeonghui	Ock Joo-hyun	Valenti	BoA	73
Round 3
Finalists	Fruit Ice Flakes with Syrup	Lee So-eun	Like the First Feeling (처음 느낌 그대로)	Lee So-ra	27
Finalists	Yeonghui	Ock Joo-hyun	Breath (숨)	Park Hyo-shin	72
Final
Battle	Yeonghui	Ock Joo-hyun	Previous three songs used as voting standard		52
Battle	The Sea Otter Baby Seahorse	K.Will	How Love is It (어떻게 사랑이 그래요)	Lee Seung-hwan	47

=== 62nd Generation Mask King ===
- Contestants : Han Sun-hwa, Kim Yeon-ja, Choi Hyun-woo, Park Yong-in (Urban Zakapa), Kan Mi-youn (Baby Vox), Oh Min-suk, Jeon In-hyuk (Yada), Im Hyun-sik (BtoB)
Episodes 123 – 124

Episode 123

Episode 123 was broadcast on August 6, 2017. This marks the beginning of the Sixty-second Generation.

Order	Stage Name	Real Name	Song	Original artist	Vote
Round 1
Pair 1	Lady Gaga	Han Sun-hwa	Love Is a Cold Temptation (사랑은 차가운 유혹)	Yang Soo-kyung	40
Pair 1	Madonna	Kim Yeon-ja	Love Is a Cold Temptation (사랑은 차가운 유혹)	Yang Soo-kyung	59
2nd Song	Lady Gaga	Han Sun-hwa	Only I Didn't Know (나만 몰랐던 이야기)	IU	–
Pair 2	Karaoke Coin	Choi Hyun-woo	One Day Long Ago (오래전 그날)	Yoon Jong-shin	21
Pair 2	Roller Boy	Park Yong-in of Urban Zakapa	One Day Long Ago (오래전 그날)	Yoon Jong-shin	78
Special (Note: This part is the panelists' special performance for Karaoke Coin's showcase special talents after his main duet stage.)	Kim Min-jong		Beautiful Pain (아름다운 아픔)	Kim Min-jong	–
Special	Kim Hyun-chul		Romance (연애)	Kim Hyun-chul	–
2nd Song	Karaoke Coin	Choi Hyun-woo	Jealousy (질투)	Yoo Seung-beom	–
Pair 3	Mrs. Curie	Kan Mi-youn of Baby Vox	Like a Child (아이처럼)	Kim Dong-ryul	68
Pair 3	Einstein	Oh Min-suk	Like a Child (아이처럼)	Kim Dong-ryul	31
2nd Song	Einstein	Oh Min-suk	Jazz Cafe (재즈카페)	Shin Hae-chul	–
Pair 4	Flamingo	Jeon In-hyuk of Yada	Always	Bon Jovi	54
Pair 4	Parrot	Im Hyun-sik of BtoB	Always	Bon Jovi	45
2nd Song	Parrot	Im Hyun-sik of BtoB	You Are Tearful (그대는 눈물겹다)	M.C the Max	–

Episode 124

Episode 124 was broadcast on August 13, 2017.

Order	Stage Name	Real Name	Song	Original artist	Vote
Round 2
Pair 1	Madonna	Kim Yeon-ja	Azalea (진달래꽃)	Maya	57
Pair 1	Roller Boy	Park Yong-in of Urban Zakapa	Emergency Room (응급실)	izi	42
Pair 2	Mrs. Curie	Kan Mi-youn of Baby Vox	Broke Up Today (오늘 헤어졌어요)	Younha	39
Pair 2	Flamingo	Jeon In-hyuk of Yada	Heeya (희야)	Boohwal	60
Round 3
Finalists	Madonna	Kim Yeon-ja	Flower Garden (꽃밭에서)	Jung Hoon-hee	58
Finalists	Flamingo	Jeon In-hyuk of Yada	Here, I Stand For You	NEXT	41
Final
Battle	Madonna	Kim Yeon-ja	Previous three songs used as voting standard		43
Battle	Yeonghui	Ock Joo-hyun	Gather My Tears (내 눈물 모아)	Seo Ji-won	56

=== 63rd Generation Mask King ===
- Contestants : Jeok Woo, Kim Dae-hee, Narsha (Brown Eyed Girls), Yebin (DIA), Yang Dong-geun, Song Ho-beom (One Two), Sang A Im-Propp, Kwon Jung-yeol (10cm)
Episodes 125 – 126

Episode 125

Episode 125 was broadcast on August 20, 2017. This marks the beginning of the Sixty-third Generation.

Order	Stage Name	Real Name	Song	Original artist	Vote
Round 1
Pair 1	Goddess Athena	Jeok Woo	Movie Dating (조조할인)	Lee Moon-se	71
Pair 1	Lighthouse Man	Kim Dae-hee	Movie Dating (조조할인)	Lee Moon-se	28
2nd Song	Lighthouse Man	Kim Dae-hee	It's Only Love (사랑일뿐야)	Kim Min-woo	–
Pair 2	Carrot Girl	Narsha of Brown Eyed Girls	Miniskirt (짧은 치마)	AOA	61
Pair 2	Corn Girl	Yebin of DIA	Miniskirt (짧은 치마)	AOA	38
2nd Song	Corn Girl	Yebin of DIA	No No No No No (노노노노노)	Ha Soo-bin	–
Pair 3	Columbus	Yang Dong-geun	Sleepless Rainy Night (잠 못 드는 밤 비는 내리고)	Kim Gun-mo	39
Pair 3	Chingiz Khan	Song Ho-beom of One Two	Sleepless Rainy Night (잠 못 드는 밤 비는 내리고)	Kim Gun-mo	60
2nd Song	Columbus	Yang Dong-geun	Elevator (엘리베이터)	Park Jin-young	–
Pair 4	Golden Mask	Sang A Im-Propp	Exhausted (지친 하루)	Yoon Jong-shin	34
Pair 4	Prince of Tree Frog	Kwon Jung-yeol of 10 cm	Exhausted (지친 하루)	Yoon Jong-shin	65
2nd Song	Golden Mask	Sang A Im-Propp	You to Me Again (그대 내게 다시)	Byun Jin-sub	–

Episode 126

Episode 126 was broadcast on August 27, 2017.

Order	Stage Name	Real Name	Song	Original artist	Vote
Round 2
Pair 1	Goddess Athena	Jeok Woo	Tuning (조율)	Han Young-ae	54
Pair 1	Carrot Girl	Narsha of Brown Eyed Girls	Now (나우)	Fin.K.L	45
Pair 2	Chingiz Khan	Song Ho-beom of One Two	Please (제발)	Deulgukhwa	32
Pair 2	Prince of Tree Frog	Kwon Jung-yeol of 10 cm	Holding the End of this Night (이 밤의 끝을 잡고)	Solid	67
Round 3
Finalists	Goddess Athena	Jeok Woo	Heart Beats (가슴이 뛴다)	Lee Eun-mi	33
Finalists	Prince of Tree Frog	Kwon Jung-yeol of 10 cm	Stay	Nell	66
Final
Battle	Prince of Tree Frog	Kwon Jung-yeol of 10 cm	Previous three songs used as voting standard		57
Battle	Yeonghui	Ock Joo-hyun	Truth or Dare (진실 혹은 대담)	Gain	42

=== 64th Generation Mask King ===
- Contestants : Kim Na-young, G.Soul, Joo Hee (8Eight), Chung Ha, Go Young-bae (Soran), Shim Hyun-seop, Lee Elijah, Lee Bo-ram (SeeYa)
Episodes 127 – 128

Episode 127

Episode 127 was broadcast on September 3, 2017. This marks the beginning of the Sixty-fourth Generation.

Order	Stage Name	Real Name	Song	Original artist	Vote
Round 1
Pair 1	Vivian Lee	Kim Na-young	Pupil (눈동자)	Uhm Jung-hwa	31
Pair 1	Charlie Chaplin	G.Soul	Pupil (눈동자)	Uhm Jung-hwa	68
2nd Song	Vivian Lee	Kim Na-young	I Fell in Love (난 사랑에 빠졌죠)	Park Ji-yoon	–
Pair 2	A Blowfish Lady	Joo Hee of 8Eight	Back in Time (시간을 거슬러)	Lyn	55
Pair 2	Flower Shrimp	Kim Chung-ha	Back in Time (시간을 거슬러)	Lyn	44
2nd Song	Blue Shrimp	Kim Chung-ha	10 Minutes	Lee Hyori	–
Pair 3	Domestic Clock	Go Young-bae of Soran	What's the Matter (왜 그래)	Kim Hyun-chul	80
Pair 3	Sangam-dong Keyboard	Shim Hyun-seop	What's the Matter (왜 그래)	Kim Hyun-chul	19
2nd Song	Sangam-dong Keyboard	Shim Hyun-seop	I Believe	Shin Seung-hun	–
Pair 4	Secret Garden	Lee Elijah	Break Away	Big Mama	51
Pair 4	Fountain Girl	Lee Bo-ram of SeeYa	Break Away	Big Mama	48
2nd Song	Fountain Girl	Lee Bo-ram of SeeYa	People Who Make Me Sad (나를 슬프게 하는 사람들)	Kim Kyung-ho	–

Episode 128

On September 4, 2017, a major strike broke out with unions representing employees of the Korean Broadcasting System and Munhwa Broadcasting Company, complaining over unfair labour practices and government interference in news coverage by favouring Park Geun-hye, who at the time had been impeached for corruption. Both stations are effectively controlled by the government, with Korean Broadcasting the state broadcaster, and Munhwa 70% owned by the government. Both stations' heads are appointed by the government. The strike ended on November 15, 2017, after Munhwa president Kim Jang-kyom was fired, which was a demand of the union in this labour stoppage.

Upon the conclusion of the labour stoppage, Episode 128, which had been postponed nine weeks, was broadcast on November 19, 2017.

Order	Stage Name	Real Name	Song	Original artist	Vote
Round 2
Pair 1	Charlie Chaplin	G.Soul	Clockwork (시계태엽)	Lim Jeong-hee	46
Pair 1	A Blowfish Lady	Joo Hee of 8Eight	Bounce	Cho Yong-pil	53
Pair 2	Domestic Clock	Go Young-bae of Soran	Love Rain (사랑비)	Kim Tae-woo	52
Pair 2	Secret Garden	Lee Elijah	Dream of Summer Night (여름밤의 꿈)	Kim Hyun-sik	47
Round 3
Finalists	A Blowfish Lady	Joo Hee of 8Eight	Sofa	Crush	37
Finalists	Domestic Clock	Go Young-bae of Soran	P.S. I Love You	Lena Park	62
Final
Battle	Domestic Clock	Go Young-bae of Soran	Previous three songs used as voting standard		20
Battle	Prince of Tree Frog	Kwon Jung-yeol of 10 cm	Eyes, Nose, Lips (눈, 코, 입)	Taeyang	79

=== 65th Generation Mask King ===
- Contestants : Sunwoo Jung-a, Jo Woo-jong, Park Hee-jin, Umji (GFriend), Im Ha-ryong, Lee Han-cheol, Lee Ji-young (Big Mama), Youngjae (B.A.P)
Episodes 129 – 130

Episode 129

Episode 129 was broadcast on November 26, 2017. This marks the beginning of the Sixty-fifth Generation.

Order	Stage Name	Real Name	Song	Original artist	Vote
Round 1
Pair 1	Red Mouth	Sunwoo Jung-a	Myself Reflected in My Heart (내 마음에 비친 내 모습)	Yoo Jae-ha	78
Pair 1	An Optical Mouse	Jo Woo-jong	Myself Reflected in My Heart (내 마음에 비친 내 모습)	Yoo Jae-ha	21
2nd Song	An Optical Mouse	Jo Woo-jong	Seoul, Here (서울 이곳은)	Jang Cheol-woong	–
Pair 2	Acorn	Park Hee-jin	Where the Wind Comes From (바람이 불어오는 곳)	Kim Kwang-seok	47
Pair 2	Pheasant	Umji of GFriend	Where the Wind Comes From (바람이 불어오는 곳)	Kim Kwang-seok	52
2nd Song	Acorn	Park Hee-jin	Just Like a Dream (꿈처럼) (Another Miss Oh OST)	Ben	–
Pair 3	First-birthday Party	Im Ha-ryong	Beautiful Lady (미인)	Shin Joong-hyun	35
Pair 3	Home Shopping Man	Lee Han-cheol	Beautiful Lady (미인)	Shin Joong-hyun	64
2nd Song	First-birthday Party	Im Ha-ryong	Honey	Park Jin-young	–
Pair 4	Green Mother	Lee Ji-young of Big Mama	Rain	Lee Juck	61
Pair 4	Morning Soccer Club	Youngjae of B.A.P	Rain	Lee Juck	38
2nd Song	Morning Soccer Club	Youngjae of B.A.P	I Need a Girl	Taeyang ft. G-Dragon	–

Episode 130

Episode 130 was broadcast on December 3, 2017.

Order	Stage Name	Real Name	Song	Original artist	Vote
Round 2
Pair 1	Red Mouth	Sunwoo Jung-a	Um Oh Ah Yeh (음오아예)	Mamamoo	73
Pair 1	Pheasant	Umji of GFriend	Freedom Age (자유시대)	Mosaic (모자이크)	26
Pair 2	Home Shopping Man	Lee Han-cheol	Red Flavor (빨간 맛)	Red Velvet	30
Pair 2	Green Mother	Lee Ji-young of Big Mama	Into the New World (다시 만난 세계)	Girls' Generation	69
Round 3
Finalists	Red Mouth	Sunwoo Jung-a	Whistle (휘파람)	Blackpink	65
Finalists	Green Mother	Lee Ji-young of Big Mama	To Me (내게로)	Jang Hye-jin	34
Final
Battle	Red Mouth	Sunwoo Jung-a	Previous three songs used as voting standard		56
Battle	Prince of Tree Frog	Kwon Jung-yeol of 10 cm	Who Are You (Guardian: The Lonely and Great God OST)	Sam Kim	43

=== 66th Generation Mask King ===
- Contestants : Jeon Ji-yoon, Kim Won-joo (4Men), Park Kwang-seon (Ulala Session), Kim Ho-young, Choi Il-hwa, Jeong Se-woon, Ben, Choi Yoo-jung (Weki Meki)
Episodes 131 – 132

Episode 131

Episode 131 was broadcast on December 10, 2017. This marks the beginning of the Sixty-sixth Generation.

Order	Stage Name	Real Name	Song	Original artist	Vote
Round 1
Pair 1	Claw Machine	Jeon Ji-yoon	Beautiful Goodbye (아름다운 이별)	Kim Gun-mo	30
Pair 1	Song Machine	Kim Won-joo of 4Men	Beautiful Goodbye (아름다운 이별)	Kim Gun-mo	69
2nd Song	Claw Machine	Jeon Ji-yoon	Friday (금요일에 만나요)	IU (ft. Jang Yi-jeong)	–
Pair 2	Green Crocodile	Park Kwang-seon of Ulala Session	A Whole New World	Aladdin OST	66
Pair 2	Pink Hippo	Kim Ho-young	A Whole New World	Aladdin OST	33
2nd Song	Pink Hippo	Kim Ho-young	In the Bus (버스 안에서)	Zaza	–
Pair 3	Crayon	Choi Il-hwa	Youth (청춘)	Sanulrim	39
Pair 3	College of Fine Arts	Jeong Se-woon	Youth (청춘)	Sanulrim	60
2nd Song	Crayon	Choi Il-hwa	Wind Wind Wind (바람 바람 바람)	Kim Beom-ryong	–
Pair 4	Dreamcatcher	Ben	Ugly	2NE1	57
Pair 4	Fourleaf Clover	Choi Yoo-jung of Weki Meki	Ugly	2NE1	42
2nd Song	Fourleaf Clover	Choi Yoo-jung of Weki Meki	Who You? (니가 뭔데)	G-Dragon	–

Episode 132

Episode 132 was broadcast on December 17, 2017.

Order	Stage Name	Real Name	Song	Original artist	Vote
Round 2
Pair 1	Song Machine	Kim Won-joo of 4Men	My Heart Isn't Like That (내 맘이 안 그래)	Lee Seung-hwan	32
Pair 1	Green Crocodile	Park Kwang-seon of Ulala Session	H.E.R	Block B	67
Pair 2	College of Fine Arts	Jeong Se-woon	Try (노력)	Park Won	25
Pair 2	Dreamcatcher	Ben	I Tried Everything (별 짓 다해봤는데)	Ali	74
Round 3
Finalists	Green Crocodile	Park Kwang-seon of Ulala Session	Incurable Disease (난치병)	Harim	47
Finalists	Dreamcatcher	Ben	Heaven	Ailee	52
Final
Battle	Dreamcatcher	Ben	Previous three songs used as voting standard		37
Battle	Red Mouth	Sunwoo Jung-a	Dear (The Man from Nowhere OST)	Mad Soul Child	62

=== 67th Generation Mask King ===
- Contestants : Han Bo-reum, Kwak Dong-hyun, Kwon Hyuk-soo, Kim Byung-se, Elly (EXID), Son Seung-won, Shin Yeon-ah (Big Mama), Park Jung-min (SS501)
Episodes 133 – 134

Episode 133

Episode 133 was broadcast on December 24, 2017. This marks the beginning of the Sixty-seventh Generation.

Order	Stage Name	Real Name	Song	Original artist	Vote
Round 1
Pair 1	Yoo Can Not Cry	Han Bo-reum	December (회상)	Turbo	27
Pair 1	Runaway Sleigh	Kwak Dong-hyun	December (회상)	Turbo	72
2nd Song	Yoo Can Not Cry	Han Bo-reum	Miss Korea (미스코리아)	Lee Hyori	–
Pair 2	Solo Troops	Kwon Hyuk-soo	Night After Night (밤이면 밤마다)	Insooni	68
Pair 2	Alone at Home	Kim Byung-se	Night After Night (밤이면 밤마다)	Insooni	31
2nd Song	Alone at Home	Kim Byung-se	My Love in Distant Memory (멀어져 간 사람아)	Park Sang-min	–
Pair 3	Santa Grandmother	LE of EXID	Couple (커플)	Sechs Kies	37
Pair 3	Nutcracker	Son Seung-won	Couple (커플)	Sechs Kies	62
2nd Song	Santa Grandmother	LE of EXID	I Ain't Going Home Tonight (집에 안갈래)	Navi ft. Geeks	–
Pair 4	Ghost Bride	Shin Yeon-ah of Big Mama	Christmas Eve (크리스마스 이브)	Kim Hyun-chul ft. Sang A Im-Propp	64
Pair 4	Scrooge	Park Jung-min of SS501	Christmas Eve (크리스마스 이브)	Kim Hyun-chul ft. Sang A Im-Propp	35
2nd Song	Scrooge	Park Jung-min of SS501	Live a Long Long Time (그대가 그대를)	Lee Seung-hwan	–

Episode 134

Episode 134 was broadcast on December 31, 2017.

Order	Stage Name	Real Name	Song	Original artist	Vote
Round 2
Pair 1	Runaway Sleigh	Kwak Dong-hyun	Named Desire (욕망이라는 이름)	Park Wan-kyu	52
Pair 1	Solo Troops	Kwon Hyuk-soo	Step by Step (발밤발밤) (Queen Seondeok OST)	Hong Kwang-ho	47
Pair 2	Nutcracker	Son Seung-won	Thanks (감사)	Kim Dong-ryul	41
Pair 2	Ghost Bride	Shin Yeon-ah of Big Mama	Asking to Sowol (소월에게 묻기를)	Jung Hoon-hee	58
Round 3
Finalists	Runaway Sleigh	Kwak Dong-hyun	My Own Your Shape (나만의 그대 모습)	B612	66
Finalists	Ghost Bride	Shin Yeon-ah of Big Mama	You Don't Love Me	Spica	33
Final
Battle	Runaway Sleigh	Kwak Dong-hyun	Previous three songs used as voting standard		28
Battle	Red Mouth	Sunwoo Jung-a	Winter Rain (겨울비)	Sinawe	71
