= Microdot (rapper) =

- 마이크로닷
- Born: Shin Jae-ho; November 21, 1993 (age 32); Jecheon, South Korea
- Relatives: Sanchez (brother)
- Musical career
- Genre: Hip hop
- Occupations: Rapper; singer
- Instrument: Vocals
- Years active: 2006–present

Korean name
- Hangul: 신재호
- RR: Sin Jaeho
- MR: Sin Chaeho

Shin Jae-ho (Korean: 신재호; born November 21, 1993), better known by his stage name Microdot (마이크로닷), is a South Korean–New Zealand rapper and singer. He debuted as a member of duo All Black, with Dok2, in 2006. He has also appeared on Show Me the Money, Unpretty Rapstar, and Tribe of Hip Hop.

== Early life ==
Microdot was born on November 21, 1993, South Korea, and is the younger brother of the rapper Sanchez. He emigrated to Auckland, New Zealand, at the age of five.

== Filmography ==
=== Television shows ===
Year	Title	Network	Notes/Ref.
2015	Show Me the Money 4	Mnet	
2015	Unpretty Rapstar 2	Mnet	
2016 – 2017	Tribe of Hip Hop S2	JTBC	Producer for Swish House
2017	Law of The Jungle in Wild New Zealand	SBS	Appeared from Ep. 268–273
2017–2018	The Fishermen and the City	Channel A	Cast member
2017–2018	modulove	tvN	

== Discography ==
=== Studio albums ===
Title	Album details	Peak chart positions
Title	Album details	KOR
Prophet	Released: December 14, 2017; Label: Shin Brothers Entertainment, Genie Music; Formats: digital download; Track listing: 1. "Prophet"; 2. "Hallelujah" (feat. YDG); 3. "Tropical Night" (feat. Beenzino); 4. "Dining Table"; 5. "Time to Shine" (feat. Chancellor); 6. "New Day" (오마주; feat. Sanchez); 7. "Back in Time" (돌아가고파); 8. "Chapter of Us" (우리 연애의 한편; feat. Han All); 9. "Mannequin" (마네킹); 10. "All Black" (feat. Dok2); 11. "Goal" (feat. Times x Two); 12. "No Stoppin"; 13. "Way Up" (feat. Boi B); 14. "Get Don" (feat. Don Mills); 15. "Blah Blah" (feat. Ravi of VIXX); 16. "DTMN" (feat. Donell Lewis); 17. "Pinnerdown" (feat. Donell Lewis); 18. "6482" (feat. Superbee); 19. "Ya Ya" (야 야; feat. SUL); 20. "Up"; 21. "You Need Love" (feat. Donell Lewis); 22. "All Stars" (별들 사이에; feat. Verbal Jint, Paloalto, djfriz); 23. "Freedom"; 24. "If I Don't Have You" (너 밖엔 없어); 25. "Fallen Star" (처음처럼; feat. Davii); 26. "Artist"; 27. "Time to Shine" (inst.); 28. "Tropical Night" (inst.); 29. "Mannequin" (마네킹; inst.)	79
My Story	Released: June 17, 2021; Label: No-Label, Universal Music Group; Formats: digital download; Track listing: 1. "Two Angels" (feat. Sein); 2. "Forgive Me"; 3. "Have I Become?" (된건지); 4. "3pm Thoughts" (오후 3시; Interlude); 5. "Regret" (후회); 6. "Now What" (어떻게); 7. "Life Goes On" (feat. Kim Seung-ju); 8. "Get Away"; 9. "Time Goes By"; 10. "Now What" (어떻게; inst.)	—
"—" denotes releases that did not chart.

=== Collaborative albums ===
Title	Album details
Chapter 1 with Dok2 as All Black	Released: May 9, 2006; Label: Gap Entertainment, CJ E&M; Formats: digital download; Track listing: 1. "Music" (feat. Sanchez); 2. "Dream" (꿈; feat. TBNY); 3. "High"; 4. "Holiday" (feat. Dynamic Duo); 5. "Bonus" (부재; feat. Bumkey)

=== Extended plays ===
Title	EP details
Microtape	Released: July 2, 2015; Label: Luminant Entertainment; Formats: digital download; Track listing: 1. "Homage" (오마주); 2. "You and I" (너와 나; feat. Sanchez); 3. "For the Road to Riches"; 4. "Applaud You"; 5. "Downbad"; 6. "Hold You Down" (feat. Bumkey); 7. "Celebration" (feat. Kiggen); 8. "Growing Up"
+64	Released: July 28, 2016; Label: LOEN Entertainment; Formats: digital download; Track listing: 1. "Auckland City"; 2. "Wave" (파도; feat. Ravi and Lil Boi); 3. "Forest Gump" (달려; feat. Dok2); 4. "Talkin Bout" (feat. Jessi); 5. "I'm Yours" (feat. Times X Two); 6. "Live Fast" (feat. Wise); 7. "Hella Trill"; 8. "Still the Same" (여전해)
Light	Released: April 6, 2018; Label: Shin Brothers Entertainment; Formats: digital download; Track listing: 1. "I Remember" (기억이 나네); 2. "With You" (너와); 3. "Star" (별; feat. Kaya); 4. "End of the Rainbow" (무지개 끝); 5. "With You" (너와; inst.)
Thinking About You	Released: July 31, 2018; Label: Shin Brothers Entertainment; Formats: digital download; Track listing: 1. "Till Then" (까지); 2. "Thinking About You" (빠지고 싶어; feat. Chancellor & Jiselle); 3. "These Days" (요즘엔; feat. Djfriz); 4. "Thinking About You" (빠지고 싶어; inst.)
Cloud	Released: December 9, 2023; Label: The Big Brother Movement Inc.; Formats: digital download; Track listing: 1. "So Long"; 2. "Forever"; 3. "My Love"; 4. "Coupe"; 5. "Falling in Love"

=== Single albums ===
Title	Album details
Prayer	Released: October 25, 2020; Label: Microdot, Kaios Co., Ltd.; Formats: digital download; Track listing: 1. "Responsibilities" (책임감); 2. "Young I" (어린 I); 3. "Alone" (나 혼자)
Sensation (Explicit Ver.)	Released: July 28, 2016; Label: The Big Brother Movement; Formats: digital download; Track listing: 1. "Sensation" (Explicit Ver.); 2. "Mask On" (Explicit Ver.)

=== Singles ===
Title	Year	Peak chart positions	Sales (DL)	Album
Title	Year	KOR	Sales (DL)	Album
As lead artist
"Homeage" (오마주)	2014	—	—N/a	Microtape
"Celebrate" feat. The Quiett, Babylon & Sanchez	2016	—	—N/a	Non-album single
"Wave" (파도) feat. Ravi & Lil Boi	2016	—	—N/a	+64
"My Lemonade"	2016	—	—N/a	Non-album single
"Only Victory" feat. Park Min-ji	2016	—	—N/a	Only Victory
"Shake It" (흔들어대) feat. Loco	2016	—	—N/a	Non-album singles
"Welcome to the Jungle" feat. Kangnam & Byungman	2017	—	—N/a	Non-album singles
"Tropical Night" feat. Beenzino	2017	—	—N/a	Prophet
"Time to Shine" feat. Chancellor	2017	—	—N/a	Prophet
"Goal" feat. Times x Two	2017	—	—N/a	Prophet
"You Need Love" feat. Donell Lewis	2017	—	—N/a	Prophet
"With You" (너와)	2018	—	—N/a	Light
"Thinking About You" (빠지고 싶어) feat. Chancellor & Jiselle	2018	—	—N/a	Thinking About You
"Only Victory" feat. Park Min-ji	2018	—	—N/a	God of Soccer OST
"You" (너) feat. Jung Joon-young	2018	—	—N/a	Non-album single
"Responsibilities" (책임감)	2020	—	—N/a	Prayer
"Forgive"	2021	—	—N/a	My Story
"Now What" (어떻게)	2021	—	—N/a	My Story
"Life Goes On" feat. kimseungju	2021	—	—N/a	My Story
"Sensation (Explicit Ver.)"	2023	—	—N/a	Sensation (Explicit Ver.)
"My Love"	2023	—	—N/a	Cloud
"Let's Drive"	2024	—	—N/a	Let's Drive
Collaborations
"My Zone" with Basick & Black Nut	2015	12	KOR: 242,219+	Show Me the Money 4
"Goal Keeper" (골키퍼) with Dok2	2015	60	KOR: 55,990+	Non-album singles
"Love Letter" with Sanchez	2015	—	KOR: 20,795+	Non-album singles
"Duel" (대결) with Chung Chae-woong	2016	—	—N/a	Duel: Final Round OST
"K.B.B" (가위바위보) with Jessi, Dumbfoundead & Lyricks	2016	—	—N/a	Non-album singles
"Fresh Up" with San E, Penomeco & Kibi	2017	—	—N/a	Non-album singles
"Thorn" (가시) with Jessi & Illson	2018	—	—N/a	A-jae Sensibility
"Hit!" with Choiza	2018	—	—N/a	Hit!!!
"Light the Fire" with Jinsil of Mad Soul Side	2018	—	—N/a	Volt: Chaos Gem OST
As featured artist
"We Young!" (요즘젊은것들) DickPunks feat. Microdot	2015	—	—N/a	Non-album singles
"New Days" (새로워져) ZZAPA feat. Microdot	2015	—	—N/a	Non-album singles
"Chaos" (아슬아슬해) KittiB feat. Microdot & YDG	2015	63	KOR: 46,276+	Unpretty Rapstar 2
"Lean On Me" DIA feat. Microdot	2015	—	Do It Amazing	
"Backindadayz" Bumkey feat. Dok2, Microdot, Sanchez & DH-Style	2016	—	—N/a	Non-album singles
"Fire" Han Yo-han feat. Microdot & Isle	2016	—	—N/a	Non-album singles
"Sun Block" (썬 블락) Superbee feat. Microdot	2016	42	KOR: 106,212+	Show Me the Money 5
"Arirang" (아리랑) K-Tigers feat. Eun Ga-eun & Microdot	2016	—	—N/a	Non-album singles
"This Means Good Bye" (안녕) A-Train feat. Microdot	2016	—	—N/a	Non-album singles
"Use to Lose" Princy feat. Microdot	2016	—	—N/a	Non-album singles
"Knock" Ash-B feat. Microdot	2016	—	—N/a	Unpretty Rapstar 3
"I Like" Koh Na-young feat. Microdot	2016	—	—N/a	Non-album singles
"Dead Great Names Society" Bizniz feat. Basick & Microdot	2016	—	—N/a	Non-album singles
"I See U" Dash feat. Microdot	2017	—	—N/a	Non-album singles
"Nuna" (들이대) Owol feat. Microdot	2017	—	—N/a	Non-album singles
"Young Luvin'" traila Song feat. DION CHOI & Microdot	2017	—	—N/a	Non-album singles
"No Brake" sebibadboy feat. Microdot, KillaGramz & RAUDI	2017	—	—N/a	Non-album singles
"Oao" (내 어깨 위에 네 고개) Yella D feat. Microdot	2017	—	—N/a	Non-album singles
"Drive Together" SUL feat. Microdot	2017	—	—N/a	Non-album singles
"So Special" Na Haeun feat. Mircodot	2018	—	—N/a	Non-album singles
"fiancée" (피앙세) Jung Joon Young feat. Mircodot	2018	—	—N/a	Non-album singles
"Sugar Cake" CoCo of CocoSori feat. Microdot	2018	—	—N/a	Non-album singles
"Fish" (물고기) Rheehab feat. Microdot	2018	—	—N/a	Non-album singles
"My Way Through the Night" psv:gun feat. Sein & Microdot	2021	—	—N/a	Non-album singles
"A/S" NONE feat. Mircodot	2023	—	—N/a	Non-album singles
"Bloody" KIMBOA feat. Microdot	2023	—	—N/a	Non-album singles
"Chocolate Cream.II" Laysha feat. Mircodot	2024	—	—N/a	Non-album singles
"—" denotes releases that did not chart.
