= Eun Jiwon discography =

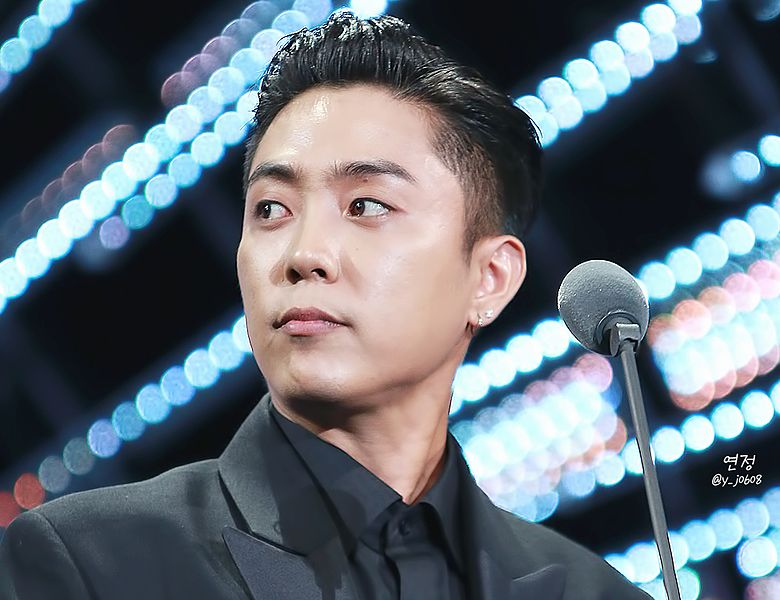
- Studio albums: 6
- Extended plays: 3
- Compilation albums: 1
- Singles: 9
- Music videos: 15

The discography of South Korean rapper and singer Eun Jiwon consists of six studio albums, one compilation album, one single album, and three extended plays.

== Albums ==
=== Studio albums ===
Title	Album details	Peak chart positions		Sales
Title	Album details	KOR RIAK	KOR Gaon	Sales
G Pop	Released: March 29, 2001; Label: Dream Music; Format: CD, cassette; Track list: 1. Murmur; 2. Delay; 3. 매듭 (Knot); 4. Maybe (Remember Me); 5. Harpy; 6. Battle Field; 7. U & Me; 8. Blooming...; 9. 아름다운 시절 (Beautiful Days); 10. Cheese; 11. One, Two, Three; 12. 이제 (Recently)	12	—N/a	KOR: 72,541
Eun Ji Won 2	Released: February 26, 2002; Label: G Production; Format: CD, cassette; Track list: 1. Money (Part II); 2. Silver Wing; 3. Monologue; 4. Retrace; 5. Get Down; 6. Dt. G. Zine; 7. Eun Jiwon Go! Go!; 8. Now (Now That We Found Love); 9. Sad Dream; 10. Oh! Girl; 11. The Dark	5	—N/a	KOR: 51,285
Drunk in Hip Hop (만취 in Hip Hop)	Released: September 5, 2003; Repackaged: December 11, 2003 as G1-03; Label: Waltz Music Entertainment; Format: CD, cassette; Track list: 1. Intro + 두 얼굴의 사나이 (Intro + A Two-Faced Man); 2. 만취 In Melody (Drunken in Melody); 3. A Skit; 4. High High; 5. I-go; 6. 개꿈 (Stupid Dream); 7. 문득 (Suddenly); 8. B Skit; 9. 어기야 디야; 10. Baby Baby; 11. C Skit; 12. 미카사로 (Mi Casa Ro); 13. 조금만 천천히 (A Little Bit Slower); 14. 3판 2승 (Two Out of Three); 15. D Skit; 16. 수수께끼 (Riddle); 17. He Say She Say	7	—N/a	KOR: 52,937
The 2nd Round	Released: February 23, 2005; Label: EMI; Format: CD, cassette; Track list: 1. Intro; 2. 8t. Truck; 3. 물음표 (Question Mark); 4. 보물찾기 (Treasure Hunt) (ft. Bobby Kim); 5. So Gone (ft. T); 6. Dirty Seoul; 7. 올빼미 (All Famy); 8. Love론 (Love Theory) (ft. Lee Hyori); 9. Skit; 10. Sluse (ft. Tyfoon); 11. 나의 세개 (My Three Things); 12. Reload (ft. Tyfoon, Gan-D & Juvie Train); 13. G Love; 14. Gotta Go (ft. Gary & Double K); 15. One (ft. Dynamic Duo)	11	—N/a	KOR: 18,155
Platonic	Released: December 10, 2009; Label: GYM, Starship Entertainment; Format: CD, digital download; Track list: 1. Intro; 2. Platonic; 3. Out Of Control (ft. 놀부 Of Fresh Boyz); 4. 설레임; 5. 싸이렌 (Siren); 6. Everything (ft. Gilme); 7. 처음처럼만; 8. Favorite; 9. 160 (ft. Lee Soo-geun); 10. Dangerous (Winter Ver.); 11. Adios (Latin-Jazz Ver.) (ft. Mr. Tyfoon)	—N/a	25	
G1	Released: June 27, 2019; Label: YG Entertainment; Formats: CD, digital download	—N/a	2	KOR: 69,937

=== Compilation albums ===
Title	Album details	Peak chart positions	Sales
Title	Album details	KOR RIAK	Sales
Eun Ji Won Best	Released: July 4, 2003; Label: Enterone Music; Formats: CD, cassette; Track list: 1. Now (That We Found The Gateway); 2. Now; 3. Monologue; 4. Money (Part II); 5. Blooming; 6. One, Two, Three (Grunge Hip Hop Version); 7. A-Ha (Extended Groove Version I); 8. Get Down (Step By Step Hip Hop Version); 9. Murmur; 10. Oh! Girl (Extended Groove Version II); 11. Silver Wing; 12. Cheese; 13. Sad Dream; 14. Never Ever; 15. You And Me (Mami Street-Non Stop Mixed); 16. Happy; 17. 악 (Evil); 18. Eun Jiwon Go! Go!; 19. Maybe; 20. 아름다운 시절 (Beautiful Days)	—	

=== Single albums ===
Title	Album details	Peak chart positions	Sales
Title	Album details	KOR RIAK	Sales
Love, Death, Introspection (사랑死랑思랑)	Released: October 30, 2007; Label: MIC Holdings; Formats: CD; Track list: 1. Deep Blue ft. 샛별 (ft. Sat Byul); 2. Adios ft. 미스터 타이푼 (ft. Mr. Tyfoon); 3. 피노키오 (Pinocchio); 4. It's True ft. Baek Ji-young; 5. Adios ft. 미스터 타이푼 (Instrumental Version) (ft. Mr. Tyfoon)	37	KOR: 3,500

== Extended plays ==
Title	Album details	Peak chart positions		Sales
Title	Album details	KOR RIAK	KOR Gaon	Sales
G	Released: October 27, 2000; Label: Dream Music; Formats: CD; Track list: 1. Never, Ever...; 2. A.D. 2050; 3. A-Ha; 4. Memory; 5. 악 6. A-Ha (Club Version); 7. Never, Ever... (Instrumental Version)	26	—N/a	KOR: 15,000
G Code	Released: November 6, 2008; Label: CH Entertainment; Formats: CD; Track list: 1. Go Show; 2. Dangerous; 3. 너하나 (Only You); 4. Kill Me (Dangerous Part 2)	—N/a	—N/a	
Trauma	Released: June 8, 2015; Label: GYM Entertainment; Formats: CD, digital download; Track list: 1. What U Are (ft. Gilme); 2. Excuse (ft. Jeremi); 3. Trauma (ft. Jeremi); 4. Soulmate (ft. Gilme)	—N/a	—	

== Singles ==
=== As a lead artist ===
Title	Year	Peak chart positions		Album
Title	Year	KOR	KOR Hot	Album
"Never, Ever..."	2000	*	*	G
"Murmur"	2001	*	*	G Pop
"Now"	2002	*	*	Eun Ji Won 2
"Drunk in Melody" (만취 In Melody)	2003	*	*	Drunk in Hip Hop
"All Family" (올빼미)	2005	*	*	The 2nd Round
"Love Theory" (Love 론) (feat. Lee Hyori)	2005	*	*	The 2nd Round
"Adios" (feat. Mr. Tyfoon)	2007	*	*	Love, Death, Introspection
"Dangerous"	2008	*	*	G-Code
"Siren" (싸이렌) (feat. Mr. Tyfoon)	2009	11	*	Platonic
"While Buzzed..." (술김에...)	2010	15	*	Non-album singles
"You’re My V.I.P" (feat. Jang Su-won)	2010	37	*	Non-album singles
"I Munna" (아무나) (feat. Gilme)	2012	19	23	Non-album singles
"Trauma" (트라우마) (feat. Jeremi)	2015	—	—	Trauma
"I'm On Fire" (불나방) (feat. Blue.D)	2019	14	9	G1

=== As a featured artist ===
Title	Year	Peaks	Album
Title	Year	KOR	Album
"Funky Mix" (돌아) (Mina featuring Eun Jiwon)	2004	*	RE:TURN 2 MINA
"Opening M.I.C (Epik High ft. Eun Jiwon, TBNY, Tweak & Dynamic Duo)	2004	*	Volume 2 - High Society
"Intro" (Bobby Kim featuring Eun Jiwon)	2004	*	Beats Within My Soul
"Dok" (Kim Woo-joo featuring Eun Jiwon)	2005	*	Before You Sleep
"크게 더 크게" (Ash featuring Eun Jiwon)	2005	*	I'm Ur Woman
"Mi Casa Es Su Casa" (Mr. Tyfoon featuring Eun Jiwon)	2007	*	Mi vida Payaso
"Crazy For The Mic Since 1978" (ft. Danny (g.o.d), Eun Jiwon & T-ache (Side-B))	2007	*	Mi vida Payaso
"Alcohol & Naiveté" (술과 순정) (J featuring Eun Jiwon and Miryo)	2007	*	Inlove Again
"The Person Who I Will Meet" (내가 만날 사람) (Lisa featuring Eun Jiwon)	2008	*	Again
"Fox" (여우가) (Moon Ji Eun featuring Eun Jiwon)	2008	*	Vivid
"The Person Who I Will Meet (내가 만날 사람) (Lisa featuring Eun Jiwon & Harin)	2008	*	The Person Who I Will Meet
"My Love" (J-Walk featuring Eun Jiwon)	2008	*	My Love
"Blazing Sun" (불타는 태양) (Mr. Tyfoon featuring Eun Jiwon)	2008	*	Bultaneun Taeyang
"갈때까지 가보자" (Lee Su Geun featuring Eun Jiwon)	2009	*	Non-album Single
"러브 컷츠" (Gilme featuring Eun Jiwon)	2009	*	The 1st Purple Dream Sound
"Let It Go" (Smokie J featuring Eun Jiwon & Fresh Boyz)	2009	*	The Konextion 2
"Beautiful Lady" (ICON featuring Eun Jiwon)	2009	*	ICONtact
"No.5" (J.ae (formerly J) featuring Eun Jiwon)	2010	*	Sentimental
"Present" (K.Will featuring Eun Jiwon)	2010	*	Non-album Single
"Huk" (헉) (Lee Su Geun featuring Eun Jiwon)	2010	*	Non-album Single
"Like a Fool" (Gilme featuring Eun Jiwon)	2012	*	Non-album Single
"Don't Know Love" (R.ef featuring Eun Jiwon)	2012	*	Non-album Single
"A Day Like Today" (Tony An featuring Eun Jiwon)	2013	*	I'm a Tony An

== Production credits ==
Year	Artist	Song	Album	Lyrics	Music
2017	Sechskies	"백하그" (Back Hug)	Another Light	Yes	No
2019	Eun Ji-won	"How We Do"	G1	Yes	Yes
2019	Eun Ji-won	"불나방" (I'm On Fire)	G1	Yes	No
2019	Eun Ji-won	"Sexy"	G1	Yes	No
2019	Eun Ji-won	"Worthless"	G1	Yes	No
2019	Eun Ji-won	"Hooligan"	G1	Yes	No

== Other appearances ==
- 2008: "Movement 4" — Bizzy & Movement (무브먼트)
