= Yezi =

South Korean rapper (born 1994)

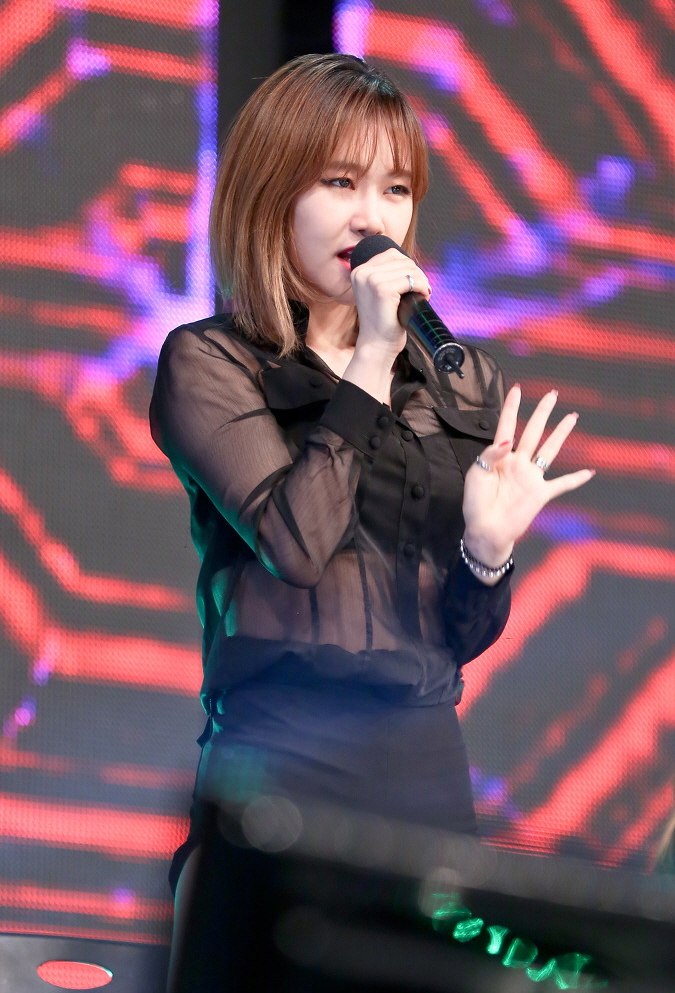
- Yezi in 2015

Background information
- Born: Lee Ye-ji; August 26, 1994 (age 32); Gangneung, South Korea
- Genres: K-pop; hip hop
- Occupations: Rapper; singer
- Instruments: Vocals; rapping
- Years active: 2012–present
- Labels: Fave; JG Star; Bomnal
- Member of: Fiestar

- Yezi
- Hangul: 이예지
- RR: I Yeji
- MR: I Yeji

Lee Ye-ji (Korean: 이예지; born August 26, 1994), better known by her stage name Yezi, is a South Korean rapper and singer. She debuted as a member of South Korean girl group Fiestar in 2012. Yezi was a semi-finalist on Unpretty Rapstar 2 in 2015, during which she released several singles. Her debut solo maxi single, Foresight Dream, was released on January 28, 2016.

== Early life and career ==
Yezi was born in Gangneung, Gangwon Province and grew up there. She learned to dance at a studio run by Clon member Kang Won-rae. She traveled four hours to Seoul every weekend to perform as a backup dancer for singers such as Park Mi-kyung and Hong Kyung-min. Her parents were originally against her working in the entertainment industry, but changed their minds when they saw how much Yezi was advancing, and she moved to Seoul in her second year of middle school.

Yezi auditioned at LOEN Entertainment after one of their trainees saw her videos posted on Cyworld. The videos were the two most popular on the social network at the time, and showed Yezi singing and dancing. Yezi became interested in rap while listening to rapper Yoon Mi-rae. After training at LOEN for three years, she debuted in the new girl group Fiestar in August 2012.

== Solo career ==
=== 2015–2017: Unpretty Rapstar 2 and solo debut ===
In September 2015, it was announced that Yezi was part of the lineup of Mnet's Unpretty Rapstar 2. The show is the second season of the television series, Unpretty Rapstar, a competition for female rappers. She was initially disliked by viewers because she kept asking others to repeat themselves; it was later revealed she told Mnet staff her hearing is "not that good". She then criticized the show's producers in her freestyle rap, which was edited out and not broadcast. Yezi became popular with viewers after her bold performance of "Crazy Dog" in the third episode. She was eliminated in episode eight, but returned for the semi-final after winning a revival round.

Two of Yezi's performances were released as singles during the show: "Solo (Remix)" (featuring Jay Park and Loco) and "Listen Up" (featuring Hanhae). Both songs charted on the Gaon Digital Chart, at numbers 16 and 27, respectively. Yezi was not well known as a member of Fiestar, and had significantly more public recognition after Unpretty Rapstar. She stated: "Before the show, people were like 'I think I saw her somewhere', but now people recognize me immediately, even if I'm not wearing my performance clothes." Her fans appreciated her "fierce" rapping style and "bad girl" image.

Yezi pre-released a new version of "Crazy Dog" on December 11, 2015. It was produced by Rhymer of Brand New Music and features San E, one of the judges on Unpretty Rapstar. Her debut maxi single, Foresight Dream, was released on January 28, 2016. It was produced by Rhymer and has four songs, including "Cider", which was promoted on various music shows. Another song, "Sse Sse Sse", features fellow contestants Gilme, KittiB and Ahn Soo-min.

On 23 December 2015, Yezi released a promotional single titled "Z-Noid" for the game Counter-Strike Online and also filmed a music video.

On 7 July 2016, Yezi also featured on the soundtrack for Wanted in a song titled "Shadow" alongside Jung Chae-yeon. On 8 September, she released a single which called "Chase" with singer Babylon. The Jazz version was released at 12 noon on the same day.

On 24 May 2017, Yezi released her second digital single "Anck Su Namum". This album marked her first producer credit since debut for an album of her own, accompanied by her usual composition and writing credit. Shinsadong Tiger is the co-producer of this album.

=== 2018–present: Solo career with JG Star ===
On May 25, 2018, Yezi's girl group, Fiestar, disbanded after five years of activity as the members did not sign contracts with Fave Entertainment again. All members decided to go their separate ways upon leaving the company. Yezi would feature on singles by Jung In, YONGZOO, and her former labelmate, NANO (History's Jaeho), before signing with a new management agency.

On July 2, 2019, JG Star Entertainment announced that Yezi had signed with their agency. Her first single under the agency, "My Gravity," was released on January 30, 2020.

On October 18, 2020, Yezi appeared on a popular Korean show, The King of Mask Singer, singing songs such as BTS' "Dynamite" and Lee Hi's "Rose" to announce her return and wanting to be seen as a multi-talented musician rather than a rapper with just a "strong image." She hopes to collaborate with artist Yoon Sang someday, inspired by his collaboration with former labelmate IU.

Yezi would go on to subsequently release various singles such as "Home," "Mimew (미묘(迷猫))","Raining All Night," "Secreto," and "No Name," showcasing her versatile talent in rapping, vocals, and dance.

Her most recent single, "Acacia," released on June 12, 2022. Yezi participated in writing and composing songs, "Mimew (미묘(迷猫))," "Raining All Night," and, "Acacia."

== Discography ==
=== Single albums ===
Title	Album details	Peak chart positions	Sales
Title	Album details	KOR	Sales
Foresight Dream	Released: January 28, 2016; Label: LOEN Tree; Format: CD, digital download; Track listing: 1. "Cider" (사이다); 2. "Moon Nation" (달나라); 3. "Sse Sse Sse" (쎄쎄쎄) (feat. Gilme, KittiB, Ahn Soo-min); 4. "Crazy Dog" (미친개) (feat. San E); 5. "Cider" (사이다) (Inst.)	19	KOR: 1,003
"—" denotes releases that did not chart or were not released in that region.

=== Singles ===
Title	Year	Peak chart positions	Album
Title	Year	KOR	Album
"Such a Woman" (Zia featuring Yezi)	2014	—	After 11 Days
"Don't Stop" (Unpretty Rapstar 2 contestants)	2015	17	Unpretty Rapstar 2 Compilation
"Solo (Remix)" (featuring Jay Park and Loco)	2015	16	Unpretty Rapstar 2 Compilation
"Listen Up" 함부로 해줘) (featuring Hanhae)	2015	27	Unpretty Rapstar 2 Compilation
"Crazy Dog" (미친개) (featuring San E)	2015	45	Foresight Dream
"Cider" (사이다)	2016	51	Foresight Dream
"Chase" (끌려다녀) (featuring Babylon)	2016	108	Non-album singles
"Anck Su Namum" (아낙수나문)	2017	—	Non-album singles
"I Love You Even Though I Hate You" (미워도 사랑하니까) (as Tango Girl)	2017	—	King of Mask Singer Episode 111
"Runaway" (도망가) (with Sool J and ultimadrap)	2017	—	Non-album singles
"Love Me" (날 사랑해요) (with Jung In)	2018	—	Non-album singles
"In Your Eyes" (눈을 맞추면) (with YONGZOO)	2018	—	Non-album singles
"My Gravity"	2020	—	Non-album singles
"Home"	2020	—	Non-album singles
"Home (Fenner Remix)"	2020	—	Non-album singles
"Mimew" (미묘(迷猫))	2020	—	Non-album singles
"Raining All Night"	2020	—	Non-album singles
"Secreto"	2021	— (Note: "Secreto" did not enter Gaon Digital Chart, but peaked at number 160 on the component Gaon Download Chart.)	Non-album singles
"No Name"	2022	—	Non-album singles
"Acacia" (아카시아)	2022	— (Note: "Acacia" did not enter Gaon Digital Chart, but peaked at number 152 on the component Gaon Download Chart.)	Non-album singles
"—" denotes releases that did not chart or were not released in that region.

=== Album participations ===
Title	Year	Album
"Sobok Sobok" (소복소복) (Sohee feat. Yezi)	2017	The Fillette
"It's my mind" (내 맴) (with LE and NC.A)	2017	Hip Hop Tribe 2: FINAL ll
"Love Me (Remastered)" (날 사랑해요) (with Jung In)	2018	A-jae Sensibility
"Maladjustment" (부적응) (NANO feat. Yezi, Prod. J.pearl)	2018	&

=== Soundtrack appearances ===
Title	Year	Peak chart positions	Album
Title	Year	KOR	Album
"Shadow" (그림자) (with Jung Chae-yeon)	2016	—	Wanted OST Part 3
"In Your Eyes (Drama Ver.)" (눈을 맞추면) (with YONGZOO)	2018	—	Are You Human? OST Part 7
"—" denotes releases that did not chart or were not released in that region.
