= Laysha =

Musical group from South Korea

- Origin: Seoul, South Korea
- Genres: K-pop; Hip hop; EDM
- Years active: 2014–present
- Labels: JS Entertainment; A1 Entertainment
- Members: Goeun; Chaejin; Jian; Semi; Hyeri; Gavin; Summer
- Past members: Sia; Rahye; Boreum; Yoobin; Seulgi; Som; Hadam; Bitna; Yujeong

Laysha (Hangul: 레이샤) is a South Korean girl group formed by JS Entertainment but is now currently under S Media Entertainment. The group currently consists of seven members: Goeun, Chaejin, Gavin, Hyeri, Jian, Semi and Summer. They debuted on May 12, 2015, with the single "Turn Up The Music". Laysha are known for their risqué concepts when performing, which they went viral for in 2015.

== History ==
=== Pre-Formation ===
Before LAYSHA, Goeun and Chaejin debuted as members of the short-lived girl group LXIA in 2012 with the single "Sexy Brown".

=== Debut, line-up changes and Chocolate Cream ===
LAYSHA was formed in September 2014 by JS Entertainment, consisting of five members: Goeun, Becky (now known by her real name, Chaejin), Som, Yoobin and Seulgi. Initially, the group was a dance cover team, known for their risque, provocative performance styles, which would lead them to go viral in 2015, with fancams of Goeun attracting millions of views.

LAYSHA made their debut on May 12, 2015 with the single "Turn Up The Music". Shortly after the group's debut, however, Seulgi would silently leave the group and Choim would join. In August 2015, Laysha would premiere two new original songs live, "Hello" and "Good Bye My Boy", as well as announce "Hello" as their upcoming second single alongside a concert announcement. A choreography video with the full studio version of "Hello" would be posted however, neither song was ever released. Later in 2015, Choim would silently leave, followed by Yoobin in early 2016. Shortly after, Hyeri was revealed as a new member.

On July 20, 2016, Laysha made their first comeback as four members with the single "Chocolate Cream", gaining more recognition in the K-Pop community as well as gaining millions of views on their official MV, which has been called one of the sexiest K-Pop music videos. Laysha would follow with their success with their third single, "Party Tonight", later that year.

=== Pink Label and controversy ===
On December 18, 2017, Laysha made their next comeback with their single "Pink Label". On August 29, 2018, Laysha were involved in a controversy with their label, JS Entertainment, when Som and Goeun revealed cameras were placed in their rooms and bathrooms to spy on them, accusing their company of placing them there. The public in social media suspected that Laysha had lied about the hidden cameras. Goeun denied the accusations that Laysha was using the controversy over the hidden cameras for marketing purposes and LAYSHA parted ways with JS.

Following the controversy, Laysha left JS Entertainment and formed their own company, A1 Entertainment, with Hyeri leaving LAYSHA in early 2019 and Som, affected by the spying event, as well as other personal reasons, deciding to leave the group later that year after a lengthy hiatus. In 2019, new members Sia, Hayeon and Hayoung were introduced as new members, however, Hayoung and Hayeon left after barely a month to rejoin their original group, May Queen, also managed by A1, which had recently reformed. Boreum was then introduced, with Laysha releasing a new single, "Freedom", in late 2019. Laysha announced an EP would be releasing in the spring of 2020, however, this release did not happen.

=== Comeback and new members ===
On January 27, 2023, Laysha announced in news articles and on social media that "LAYSHA is back!", revealing plans for new music. On March 29, however, Boreum left Laysha due to health issues.

On April 3 and 4th, profiles for new members Rahye and Bitna were released to social media. On April 11, Laysha officially revealed full-scale comeback plans, with their first solo concert in Seoul on June 9, where Laysha will premiere their new song. Furthermore, Laysha will hold their first fan meeting and mention plans for their first "U.S. album".

On February 1, 2024 guest member DJ Ina left the group.

On August 26, 2026, a promotional video was uploaded via the group's official Instagram account, confirming and showcasing the full seven-member lineup consisting of Goeun, Chaejin, Hyeri, Jian, Semi, Gavin and Summer.

== Members ==
=== Current ===
- Goeun (고은) – 2014–present
- Chaejin (채진) – 2014–present
- Hyeri (혜리) – 2015-2019; 2026–present
- Semi (세미) – 2021 (temporary member); 2025-present
- Jian (지안) – 2024–2025; 2025–present
- Gavin (개빈) – 2025 (temporary member); 2025-present
- Summer (여름) - 2026–present

== Former Members ==
=== Former ===
- Yoobin (유빈) – 2014–2015
- Seulgi (슬기) – 2014–2015
- Som (솜) – 2015-2019
- Boreum (보름) – 2019-2023
- Rahye (라혜) – 2023
- Sia (시아) – 2019–2024
- Yujeong (유정) - 2026–present
- Hadam (하담) – 2019 (temporary member); 2025-2026
- Bitna (빛나) – 2023–2026

=== Temporary Members ===
- Choim (초임) – 2015
- Hayoung (하영) – 2019
- Hayeon (하연) – 2019
- DJ Ina (디제이이나) – 2023–2024

== Discography ==
Singles

- 2015: "Turn up the Music"
- 2016: "Party Tonight"
- 2016: "Chocolate Cream"
- 2017: "Pink Label"
- 2019: "Freedom" (프리덤)
- 2023: "붉은 꽃"(Red Flower)
- 2023: "Summer Night"
- 2023: "YES or NOT"
- 2024: "CHOCOLATE CREAM.II"
- 2024: "LAYSHA Party Tonight"
- 2024: "Domino"

Unreleased

- 2015: Hello
- 2015: Good Bye My Boy

== Videography ==
2015	"Turn Up the Music"	Non-album singles
2016	"Chocolate Cream (feat. NASSUN)"	Non-album singles
2017	"Party Tonight (Remake Version)"	Non-album singles
2017	"PINK LABEL"	Non-album singles
2019	"FREEDOM (프리덤)"	Non-album singles
2023	"붉은 꽃 (Red Flower)"	Non-album singles
2023	"Summer Night"	Non-album singles
2023	"Yes or Not"	Non-album singles
2024	"Chocolate Cream.II (feat. Microdot)"	Non-album singles
2024	"LAYSHA Party Tonight"	Non-album singles
2024	"Domino"	Non-album singles
