= G programming language =

G programming language may refer to:

- G-code, a programming language, used mainly in automation
- G, the graphical programming language used in LabVIEW
- G, a programming language for rapid development of OpenGL applications
