= Yuk Ji-dam =

South Korean rapper (born 1997)

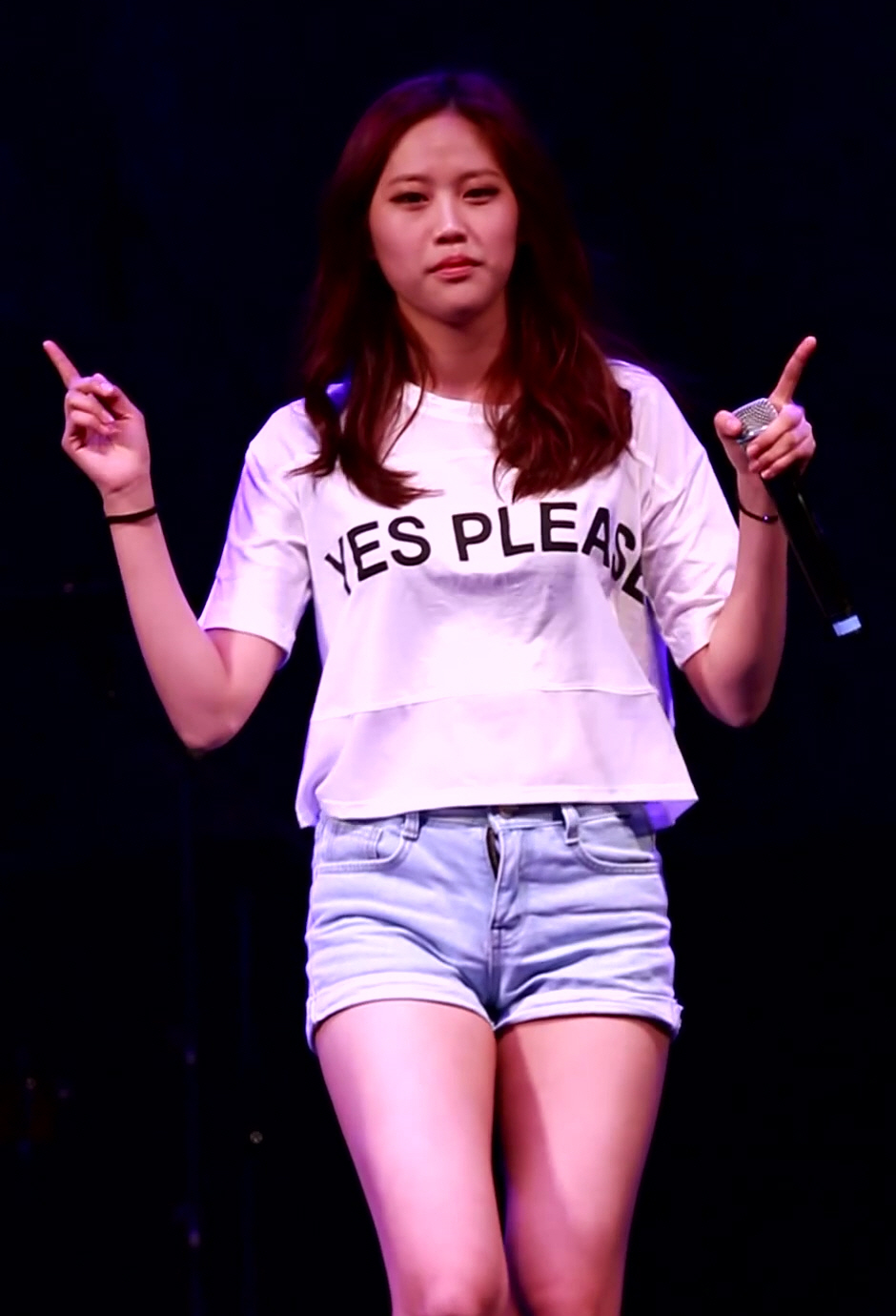
- Yuk in 2015

Background information
- Also known as: Yookji, Jidam
- Born: Yook Ji-dam; March 10, 1997 (age 29); Daegu, South Korea
- Genre: Korean hip hop
- Occupation: Rapper
- Years active: 2014–2018

Korean name
- Hangul: 육지담
- RR: Yuk Jidam
- MR: Yuk Chidam

Yuk Ji-dam (Korean: 육지담; sometimes known as Jidam (지담) or Yukji (육지); born March 10, 1997) is a South Korean rapper from Daegu. She gained popularity with her participation on the hip hop TV competitions Show Me the Money and Unpretty Rapstar. She returned to Unpretty Rapstar 3 as a contestant.

== Early life ==
Yuk Ji-dam was born in Daegu on March 10, 1997. In the years she attended school, she was reportedly bullied and made fun of because of her dark skin. Eventually, she grew inspired by Yoon Mi-rae's song "Black Happiness", which is about growing half-black in an Asian conservative country. This led to her interest in hip hop music.

== Discography ==
=== Singles ===
Title	Year	Peak chart positions	Sales (DL)	Album
Title	Year	KOR	Sales (DL)	Album
As lead artist
"Ulleri" (얼레리)	2014	63	KOR: 52,645	Show Me the Money 3
"Stayed Up All Night" (밤샜지)	2015	19	KOR: 194,469	Unpretty Rapstar 1
"On & On" feat. Baek Ye-rin	2015	20	KOR: 155,875	Unpretty Rapstar 1
"Bbam Bbam Hae" (빰빰해) feat. Gill, Mad Clown	2016	36	KOR: 80,480	Unpretty Rapstar 3
"No Thx" feat. Suran, Dean	2016	83	KOR: 22,899	Unpretty Rapstar 3
"Heart" (심장) feat. Kim Na-young	2016	—	—N/a	Unpretty Rapstar 3
Collaborations
"My Sympathy" (감성팔이) with Jubi	2015	—	KOR: 30,461	Non-album singles
"Love X Go Away" (사랑 X 꺼져) with Shannon	2015	—	—N/a	Non-album singles
"—" denotes releases that did not chart.

Also she collaborated with Hyuna on the song "Ice Ice" from A+.

== Filmography ==
=== Variety shows ===
Year	Title	Network	Notes
2014	Show Me the Money 3	Mnet	Contestant
2015	Unpretty Rapstar	Mnet	Contestant
2016	Unpretty Rapstar 3	Mnet	Contestant
