= Unpretty Rapstar =

TV show

- Hangul: 언프리티 랩스타
- RR: Eonpeuriti raepseuta
- MR: Ŏnp'ŭrit'i raepsŭt'a
- Presented by: San E (seasons 1–2); YDG (season 3)
- Country of origin: South Korea
- Original language: Korean
- No. of seasons: 3
- No. of episodes: 28

Production
- Running time: 2 hours

Original release
- Network: Mnet
- Release: January 29, 2015 – September 30, 2016

Related
- Show Me the Money

Unpretty Rapstar (Korean: 언프리티 랩스타) is a South Korean rap competition TV show that airs on Mnet. It is known as the female counterpart of Show Me The Money. The contestants compete with each other to get a chance to participate in the new song that the producers made.

== Season 1 ==
Unpretty Rapstar
- No. of episodes: 8

Release
- Original network: Mnet
- Original release: January 29 – March 26, 2015

The show premiered in January 2015 on Mnet and was hosted by Korean rapper San E. In August 2015, it was confirmed that the show would begin airing its second season on September 11, 2015. The winner in Season 1 was Cheetah.

=== Contestants ===
Winner: Cheetah (SMTM contestant)
First runner-up: Jessi (former Lucky J member)
Second runner-up: Yuk Ji-dam (SMTM3 contestant, Unpretty Rapstar 3 contestant)
Semi-finalists:

- Kisum (SMTM3 contestant)
- Jimin (former AOA member)
- Jolly V (SMTM3 contestant)

Eliminated contestants:

- Tymee (SMTM3 contestant) (Eliminated in episode 6)
- Jace of Miss $ (Joined in episode 4, eliminated in episode 6)
- Lil Cham (Eliminated in episode 4)

=== Self-introduction through a cypher ===
An ice-breaker where all contestants and the host do a rap for their self-introduction, using the same beat. The rappers are allowed to initiate or respond to pre-game diss battles.

=== One-take video mission ===
The first mission in all seasons of Unpretty Rapstar was contestants collaborating with judges, producers, and fellow contestants to create a music video for an original rap song. The video is mostly filmed in one unedited take, and the rappers must also write and arrange the song. After the filming of the music video for the song is complete, the rappers vote for who did the best and worst, in a fully disclosed process. The winner of the mission receives an advantage for the next challenge or the next part of the track missions. Whoever is voted last by their fellow rappers receives a penalty of being excluded from the next mission, or from the song that was produced through the one-take mission.

=== Diss Battles ===
A series of one-on-one rap battles where the contestants put one another down through diss rap. Unlike rap battles in Show Me the Money, these are closed events with no MCs.

== Season 2 ==
Unpretty Rapstar
- Promotional poster
- Genre: Reality television
- Presented by: San E
- Theme music composer: D.O
- Opening theme: "Don't Stop" by Heize, Kasper, Ash-B, Hyolyn, Gilme, Ahn Soo Min, Yezi, KittiB, Sua, Yubin & Truedy
- Country of origin: South Korea
- Original language: Korean
- No. of seasons: 3
- No. of episodes: 10

Production
- Running time: 90 minutes

Original release
- Network: Mnet
- Release: September 11 – November 13, 2015

=== Contestants ===
Winner: Truedy (signed with Mnet before show; SMTM6 contestant)
First runner-up: KittiB (rapper signed with Brand New Music after the show ended)
Second runner-up: Hyolyn (former Sistar member)
Third runner-up: Moon Sua (former YG Entertainment trainee; now member of Billlie under Mystic Story)
Semi-finalists:

- Heize (Now with P Nation)
- Yubin (former Wonder Girls member)
- Jeon Jiyoon (former 4Minute member) (Joined in episode 4)
- Yezi (Fiestar member)

Eliminated contestants:

- Kasper (former Play the Siren member, SMTM4 and SMTM6 contestant) (Eliminated in episode 8)
- Exy of Cosmic Girls (Joined in episode 6, eliminated in episode 8)
- Kim of Rubber Soul, (The Unit contestant) (Joined in episode 6, eliminated in episode 7)
- Gilme of Clover (Eliminated in episode 5)
- Ahn Soo Min (SMTM4 contestant) (Eliminated in episode 3)
- Ash-B (Unpretty Rapstar 3 contestant, SMTM5 contestant) (Eliminated in episode 3)

== Season 3 ==
Unpretty Rapstar
- Promotional poster
- Genre: Reality television
- Presented by: YDG
- Country of origin: South Korea
- Original language: Korean
- No. of seasons: 3

Production
- Production locations: Seoul, South Korea

Original release
- Network: Mnet
- Release: July 29, 2016

The show premiered in July 2016 on Mnet as a spin-off of Show Me the Money. The show was hosted by rapper and producer YDG, and the winner of it was Giant Pink.

=== Contestants ===
Winner: Giant Pink (SMTM5 contestant)
First runner-up: Nada (former Wa$$up member, SMTM3 contestant)

Semifinalists:

- Jeon So-yeon of Cube Entertainment (Produce 101 trainee during that time and now (G)I-dle leader)
- Ash-B (Unpretty Rapstar 2 contestant, SMTM5 contestant)

Quarter Finalists:

- Miryo of Brown Eyed Girls, (SMTM producer) (Eliminated in episode 9)
- Yuk Ji-dam (Unpretty Rapstar 1 contestant, SMTM3 contestant) (Eliminated in episode 9)

Eliminated Contestants:

- Euna Kim (former The Ark member, Superstar K3 contestant, The Unit contestant, KHAN member) (Eliminated in episode 8)
- Grazy Grace (YouTube vlogger and soloist) (Eliminated in episode 8)
- Ha Jooyeon (former Jewelry member, SMTM5 contestant) (Eliminated in episode 6)
- Janey (former GP Basic member, SMTM5 contestant, The Unit contestant) (Eliminated in episode 6)
- Kool Kid (K-pop Star 4 contestant) (Joined in episode 3, eliminated in episode 5)
- Kassy (Eliminated in episode 3)

Additional Match Contestants:

- Ki Hui-hyeon of DIA (Produce 101 contestant)
- Tilda (SMTM5 contestant)
- Ra$on (SMTM6 contestant)
- Lola Roze

== Hip Pop Princess ==
The fourth instalment of the series was a Korean-Japanese survival show produced by CJ EMN, and premiered from October to December 2025 on Mnet, TVING and U-NEXT. The show was hosted by former contestant and producer Soyeon, joined by producers Gaeko, Takanori Iwata and RIEHATA. The top 7 finalists of 40 contestants would debut as the girl-group Hiipe Princess in 2026.

=== Contestants ===
Final Seven:

1. Yuju (I-Land 2 contestant)
2. Coco (Who Is Princess? contestant)
3. Niko
4. YSY (soloist, former pre-debut VVS member)
5. Doi
6. Rino
7. Sujin (Universe Ticket contestant)
