= Giant Pink =

South Korean rapper (born 1991)

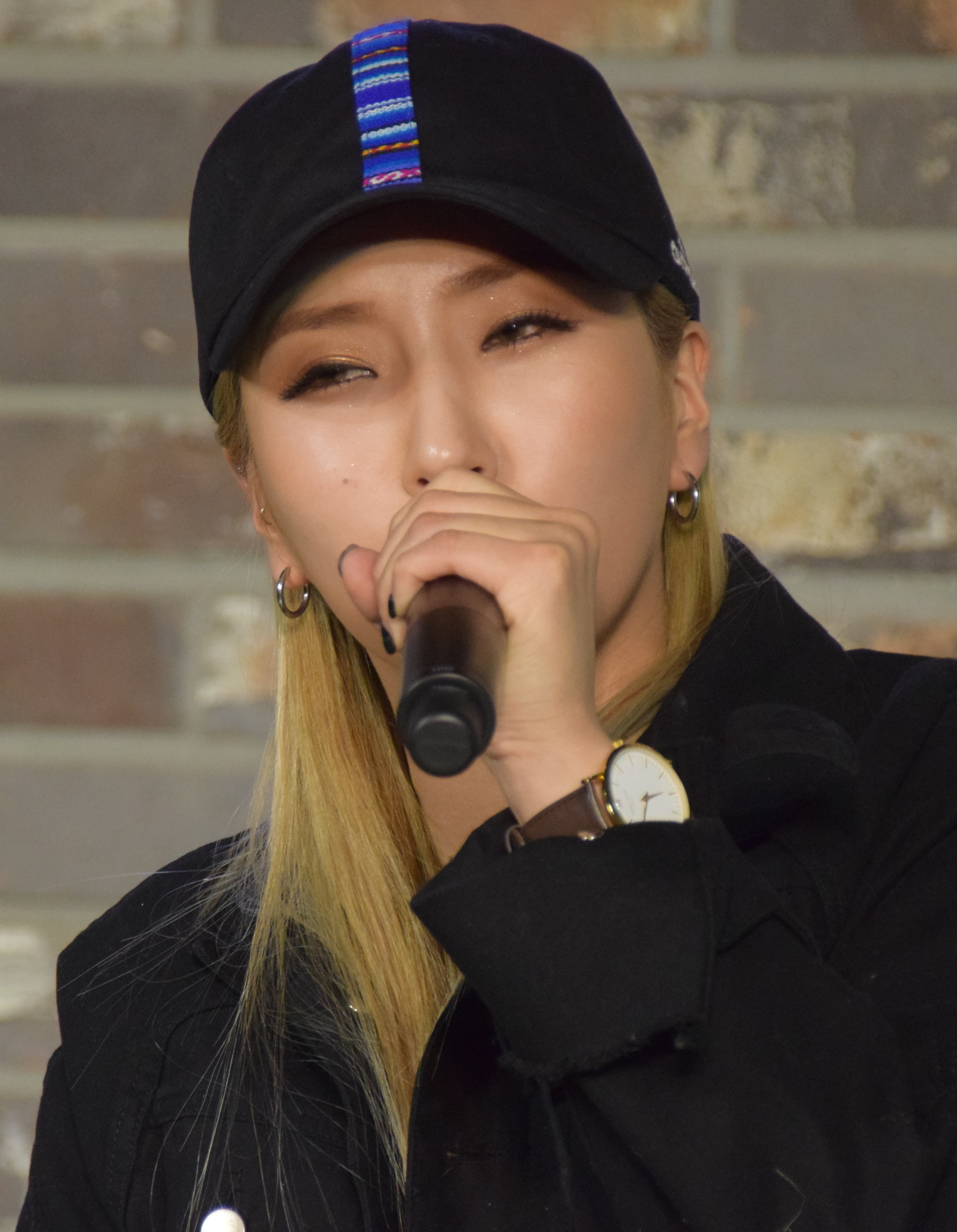
- Giant Pink in 2019
- Born: Park Yun-ha; April 23, 1991 (age 35); Busan, South Korea
- Occupation: Rapper
- Years active: 2016–present
- Spouse: Han Dong-hoon (m. 2020)
- Children: 1
- Musical career
- Genre: Hip hop
- Label: All I Know Music (AIKM) (SM)

Korean name
- Hangul: 박윤하
- RR: Bak Yunha
- MR: Pak Yunha

Park Yun-ha (Korean: 박윤하; born April 23, 1991), better known by her stage name Giant Pink (자이언트핑크), is a South Korean rapper. She was the winner of hip-hop competition show Unpretty Rapstar 3, and she is currently a member of the hip-hop label All I Know Music (AIKM), a sub-label under SM Entertainment.

== Personal life ==
Giant Pink married a younger businessman in November 2020. On December 6, 2021, she announced that she is pregnant after a year of marriage. On March 16, 2022, Giant Pink gave birth to her first son.

== Controversy ==
In early 2022, Giant Pink's inclusion of verses from the Bhagavad Gita into her song "Pink" caused controversy among Indian fans.

== Filmography ==
=== Television show ===
Year	Title	Ref.
2016	Show Me the Money 5	
2016	Unpretty Rapstar 3	
2017	Strong Girls	
2022	Queen of Wrestling	
2022	Party Resolution	
2022	Running Full Course	

== Discography ==
=== Releases ===
- "가위 바위 보" (Rock Scissors Paper), with Miryo (2016)
- "돈벌이" (Make Money), with Duckbae (2016)
- "미인" (Beauty), with Dok2 (Unpretty Rapstar 3, final track) (2016)
- "BUB", with MyunDo (Unpretty Rapstar 3 CD) (2016)
- "E.G.O", with Boi B and Sanchez (Unpretty Rapstar 3 CD) (2016)
- "All I Know Music Cypher" with Miryo, Duckbae, and Bray (2016)
- "Mirror Mirror" (2019)
- "Burn Out" (2020)
- "어때" (Come Closer) (2021)
- "Pink" (2021)

=== Collaborations ===
Year	Song title	Artist
2017	"Love Affair"	Niel ft. Giant Pink
2019	"Tuesday is Better than Monday"	ft. Yeri (Red Velvet)
2021	"Sweet"	Soyul and Bernard Park ft. Giant Pink
