= Clover (group) =

South Korean hip-hop group

- Origin: Seoul, South Korea
- Genres: Hip hop
- Years active: 2011–2014
- Labels: GYM Entertainment
- Members: Eun Ji-won; Mr. Tyfoon; Gilme

Clover (Korean: 클로버) was a South Korean hip hop trio under GYM Entertainment in Seoul, South Korea. The group debuted on March 31, 2011, with Classic Over. The group ceased activities after 2014.

== Discography ==
=== Extended plays ===
| Title | Album details | Peak chart positions | Sales |
| Title | Album details | KOR | Sales |
|---|---|---|---|
| Classic Over | Released: March 31, 2011; Label: GYM Entertainment, LOEN Entertainment; Formats: CD, digital download | 15 | KOR: 1,046 |

=== Singles ===
| Title | Year | Peak chart positions | Sales (DL) | Album |
| Title | Year | KOR | Sales (DL) | Album |
|---|---|---|---|---|
| "La Vida Loca" | 2011 | 15 | KOR: 830,582 | Classic Over |
| "A Guy Who I Know" (아는 오빠) | 2011 | 13 | KOR: 813,466 | Non-album singles |
| "Pork Soup" (돼지 국밥) | 2012 | 29 | KOR: 166,312 | Non-album singles |
| "Trickling" (주르륵) | 2013 | 32 | KOR: 54,493 | Non-album singles |
"—" denotes releases that did not chart.

== Awards ==
| Award ceremony | Year | Category | Result | Ref. |
|---|---|---|---|---|
| Seoul Music Awards | 2012 | Hip-Hop Award | Won | |
