= KittiB =

South Korean rapper (born 1990)

KittiB 김보미
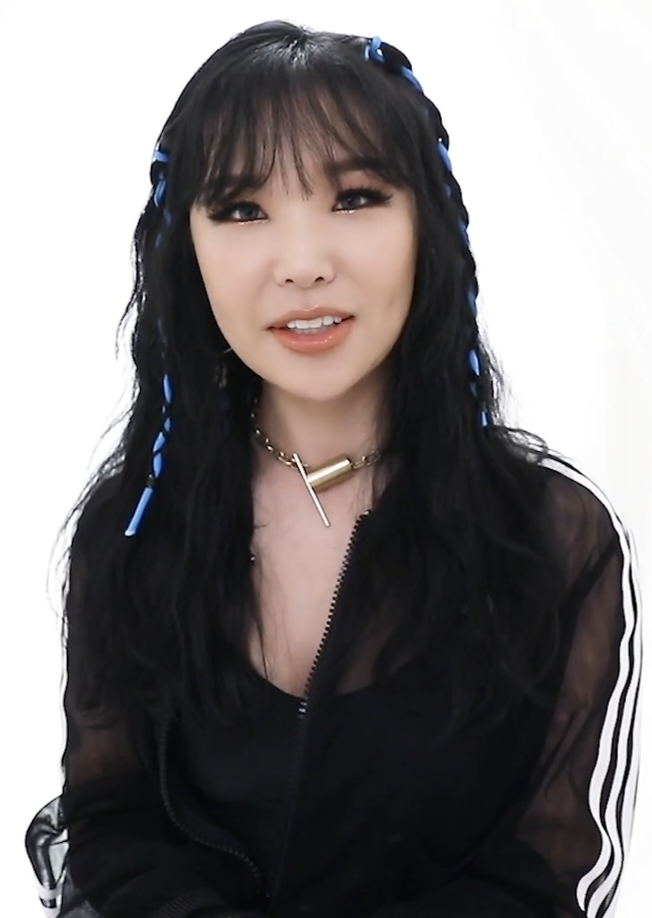
- KittiB in June 2019

Background information
- Born: Kim Bo-mi; July 27, 1990 (age 36); Siheung, Gyeonggi, South Korea
- Genre: Korean hip hop
- Occupations: Rapper; songwriter
- Years active: 2012–present
- Label: Brand New Music (2015–2020)

Korean name
- Hangul: 김보미
- RR: Gim Bomi
- MR: Kim Pomi

Kim Bo-mi (Korean: 김보미; born July 27, 1990), better known by her stage name, KittiB (키디비), is a South Korean rapper and songwriter. She was the first runner-up in TV music competition Unpretty Rapstar 2.

== Career ==
KittiB debuted in 2012 with the single, "I'm Her," which featured R&B singer Zion.T. In 2015, she appeared on TV rap competition Unpretty Rapstar 2, where she ultimately placed second overall. Following the show's finale, she signed a contract with hip hop label Brand New Music. In April 2016, she appeared as a producer on JTBC's rap competition show, Tribe of Hip Hop, which pairs rappers with non-rapper celebrities to teach them hip-hop.

== Discography ==
=== Singles ===
==== As lead artist ====
Title	Year	Peak chart positions	Sales	Album
Title	Year	KOR	Sales	Album
"I'm Her" (featuring Zion.T)	2013	—		Non-album single
"Wake Me Up"	2013	—		Non-album single
"Leopard Gun"	2013	—		Non-album single
"Must Be Nice"	2014	—		Non-album single
"Back to Basic"	2015	—		Non-album single
"Don't Stop"	2015	17	KOR: 155,244+	Unpretty Rapstar 2
"Chaos"	2015	63	KOR: 46,276+	Unpretty Rapstar 2
"Ronda Rousey Flow"	2015	—		Unpretty Rapstar 2
"Doin' Good" (featuring Verbal Jint)	2016	—		Non-album single
"Nobody's Perfect"	2016	—		Non-album single
"5cm Per Second" (초속 5 cm)	2017	—		
"Anymore"	2019			1718 [SALEM]
"—" denotes releases that did not chart or were not released in that region.

==== As featured artist ====
Title	Year	Artist(s)
"Belief"	2012	Nieah
"Scream At Me"	2012	Donut Man
"Kiss My Ass"	2013	Viann
"Hooted"	2014	Royal Class
"Oh Nice"	2014	Roydo
"Fetish"	2015	Minje
"Good Night"	2015	mNine
"Must Be Nice" (Remix)	2015	Chacoal, Domo (rapper), SIMS, & Ill Chang
"너 뿐이고"	2015	Hyun Woo
"비 개인 후 비" (After Rain)	2016	As One
"Sse Sse Sse"	2016	Yezi

== Filmography ==
=== Variety show ===
Year	Title	Network	Notes/Ref.
2015	Unpretty Rapstar 2	Mnet	Contestant (runner-up)
2016	Tribe of Hip Hop (Season 1)	JTBC	Producer
2020	King of Mask Singer	MBC	Contestant as "Do You Want Apricot?" (episodes 263–264)
