= Gilme =

South Korean singer

- Born: Gil Mi-hyun; April 10, 1983 (age 43); Daegu, South Korea
- Genre: Hip hop
- Occupation: Singer
- Instrument: Vocals
- Years active: 2009–present
- Label: GYM Entertainment
- Member of: Clover

Korean name
- Hangul: 길미현
- RR: Gil Mihyeon
- MR: Kil Mihyŏn

Gil Mi-hyun (Korean: 길미현, born April 10, 1983), known by the stage name Gilme (길미), is a South Korean singer and member of Clover. She was a contestant on Unpretty Rapstar 2. She released her debut album, Love Actually, on July 29, 2010.

== Discography ==
=== Studio albums ===
Title	Album details	Peak chart positions
Title	Album details	KOR
Love Actually	Released: July 29, 2010; Label: LOEN Entertainment; Formats: CD, digital download	22
2 Face	Released: September 4, 2014; Label: GYM Entertainment, LOEN Entertainment; Formats: CD, digital download	48

=== Singles ===
Title	Year	Peak chart positions	Sales	Album
Title	Year	KOR	Sales	Album
As lead artist
"Love Cuts" (feat. Eun Ji-won)	2009	—		Love Actually
"Why Baby Why" (넌 나를 왜) (feat. Jungyup)	2009	4		Love Actually
"Love Is War" (사랑은 전쟁이다) (feat. Outsider)	2010	28		Love Actually
"I'm Sorry I Loved You" (미안해 사랑해서...) (feat. K.Will)	2010	14		Love Actually
"Why Like An Idiot" (바보처럼 왜이래) (feat. Na Yoon-kwon)	2010	35		2 Face
"Like A Fool" (내가 먼저) (feat. Eun Ji-won)	2012	19	KOR: 592,613	2 Face
"My Sweetie"	2012	74	KOR: 91,328	2 Face
"Go Away With Smile" (웃고 떠나) (feat. Jui, Mr. Tyfoon)	2013	26	KOR: 128,310	2 Face
"Nobody Knows"	2014	48	KOR: 46,532	2 Face
"My Turn"	2014	—	KOR: 16,579	2 Face
"Tell Me This Is Real"	2015	—	KOR: 18,324	Non-album singles
"Can't Stop" (멈출 수 없어)	2015	—		Non-album singles
"Bad Guy" (나쁜 놈)	2019	—		Non-album singles
"Love, Red" (빨간 날) (with Miss S, Bombastic)	2022	—		Non-album singles
"Ulda Tto Unneunda" (울다 또 웃는다)	2023	—		Non-album singles
As featured artist
"Still" (아직도 널) (All That feat. Gilme)	2010	—		Love Me
"Latte" (라떼 한잔) (Gavy NJ feat. Gilme)	2011	13		Latte
"Love Is Pain" (Jang Hee-young feat. Gilme)	2012	54		Starting Is Over
"I Munna" (아무나) (Eun Ji-won feat. Gilme)	2012	19		Non-album singles
"Hello" (Ko Yoo-jin feat. Gilme)	2017	—		Non-album singles
"Madly 2021" (미치도록 2021) (Marco feat. Gilme)	2021	—		Non-album singles
"—" denotes releases that did not chart or were not released in that region.

=== Soundtrack appearances ===
Title	Year	Peak chart positions	Sales	Album
Title	Year	KOR	Sales	Album
"May Our Love Story" (우리 사랑 이대로)	2010	55	—N/a	Flames of Desire OST
"—" denotes releases that did not chart.
