= Sinivuori Strict Nature Reserve =

Protected area in Finland

- IUCN category Ia (strict nature reserve)
- Location within Finland
- Location: Pirkanmaa, Finland
- Coordinates: 61°34′28″N 24°43′44″E
- Area: 97 ha (240 acres)
- Established: 1956
- Governing body: Metsähallitus

Sinivuori Strict Nature Reserve (Sinivuoren luonnonpuisto) is a strict nature reserve located in the Pirkanmaa region of Finland. It is one of three small strict nature reserves in Finland, alongside Karkali and Vesijako, that are designated specifically as scientific reserves "consisting of small areas of valuable habitat types". The reserve is located on the Sinivuori hill near the village of Mulkoila in the municipality of Orivesi. There are no paths in this reserve of deciduous forest, though walking on the crossing roads is allowed. Most of the forests of this type in Finland have been logged down, when fields were created.

The reserve was established in 1956. It covers an area of 97 hectares (240 acres) and is part of the Natura 2000 network. Its southern part is mainly old spruce forest, while the northern part is dominated by birches, as slash-and-burn agriculture was historically practiced in the area. Lindens and maples are also found in the forest. The reserve also includes a small wych elm grove, which has been protected since 1955.
