= Evia =

Evia may refer to:

== People ==
- E.via, South Korean rapper
- Edgar de Evia (1910–2003), Mexican-born American photographer

== Places ==
- Euboea, or Evia, an island of Greece
- Iŭje, Belarus

== Other uses ==
- Evia (moth), a genus of moth
- Evia Lifestyle Center, a shopping mall in the Philippines
- Evia Oyj, a Finnish marketing communication agency
