= Sompio Strict Nature Reserve =

Protected area in Finland

- IUCN category Ia (strict nature reserve)
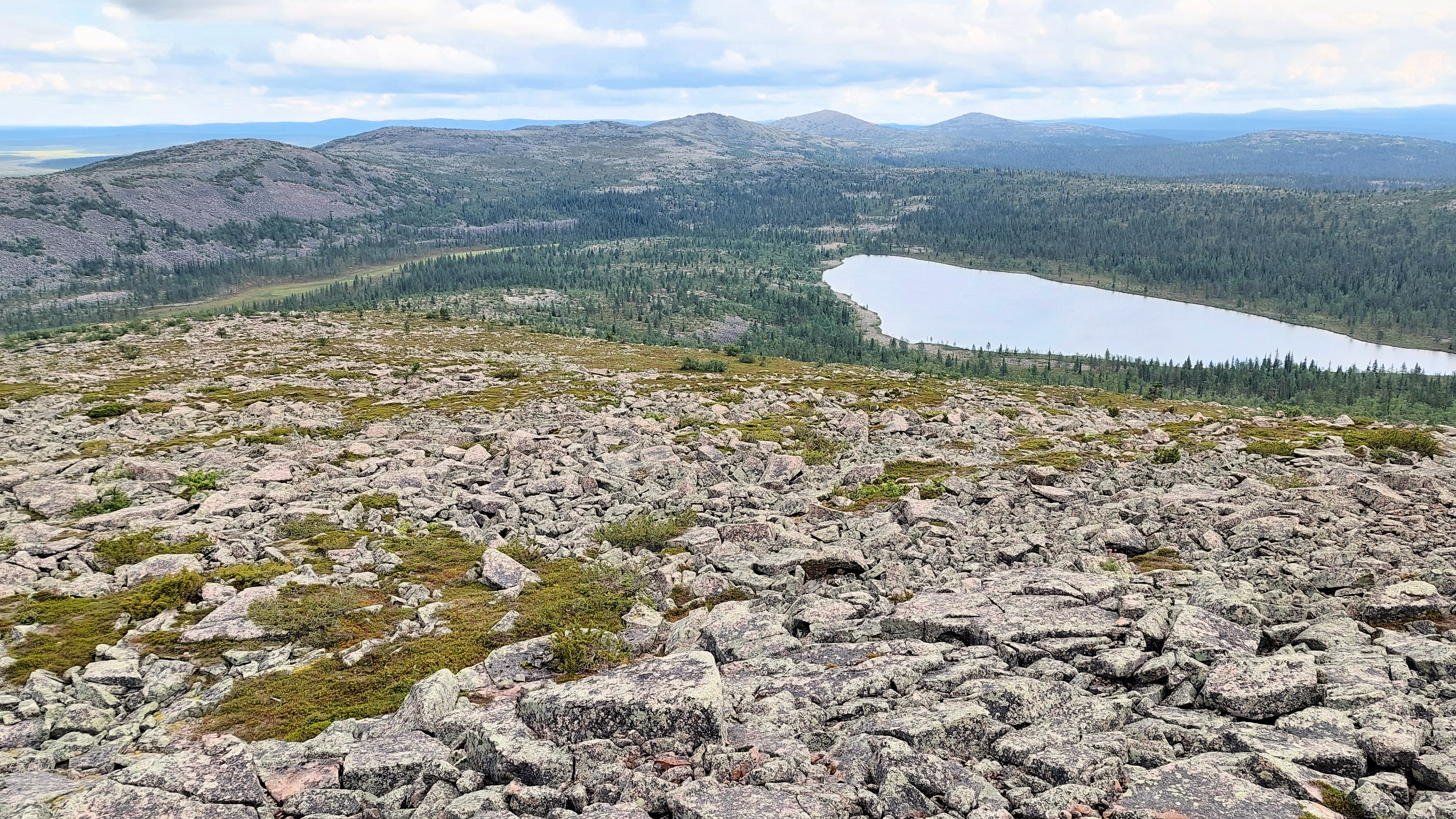
- View from Pyhä-Nattanen fjeld in Sompio Strict Nature Reserve

- Location within Finland
- Location: Lapland, Finland
- Coordinates: 68°9′34″N 27°23′37″E
- Area: 179 km^{2} (69 sq mi)
- Established: 1956
- Governing body: Metsähallitus

Sompio Strict Nature Reserve (Finnish: Sompion luonnonpuisto) is a strict nature reserve located in Lapland, Finland. The primary objective is to preserve forest, fjeld and mire nature. The core of the strict nature reserve is formed by the Nattastunturit Fjelds. Roaming in the reserve is allowed only along marked trails.
