= Strict nature reserves of Finland =

Strict nature reserves (luonnonpuisto) are specific areas on state-owned lands in Finland which have been established by law for scientific reasons. Their primary purpose is the conservation of nature and research and "are to be permanently preserved undisturbed in as close to their natural state as possible." The regulations for the nature reserves are much stricter than those for the national parks of Finland. It is usually not permitted to travel inside the areas, although some areas have trails open for the public. The strict nature reserves cover a total area of 1,530 km^{2}.

There are a total of 19 strict nature reserves in Finland. As of 2025, all of them are managed by the Metsähallitus.

== List of nature reserves ==
- Häädetkeidas
- Karkali
- Kevo
- Koivusuo
- Malla
- Maltio
- Olvassuo
- Paljakka
- Pelso
- Pisavaara
- Runkaus
- Salamanperä
- Sompio
- Sukerijärvi
- Sinivuori
- Ulvinsalo
- Vaskijärvi
- Vesijako
- Värriö

== See also ==
- Protected areas of Finland
