= Sukerijärvi Strict Nature Reserve =

Protected area in Finland

- IUCN category Ia (strict nature reserve)
- Location within Finland
- Location: Northern Ostrobothnia, Finland
- Coordinates: 66°22′2″N 28°54′26″E
- Area: 22 km^{2} (8.5 sq mi)
- Established: 1982
- Governing body: Metsähallitus

Sukerijärvi Strict Nature Reserve (Sukerijärven luonnonpuisto) is a strict nature reserve located in Northern Ostrobothnia, Finland. This reserve resembles parts of Oulanka National Park, which has popular backpacking trails. There is no public access.
