= Koivusuo Strict Nature Reserve =

Nature reserve in Finland

- IUCN category Ia (strict nature reserve)
- Location within Finland
- Location: North Karelia, Finland
- Coordinates: 62°58′32″N 31°24′12″E
- Area: 20 km^{2} (7.7 sq mi)
- Established: 1982
- Governing body: Metsähallitus

Koivusuo Strict Nature Reserve (Koivusuon luonnonpuisto) is a strict nature reserve located in the North Karelia region of Finland.

This reserve has been a regular place for visits by wolverines, Eurasian brown bears, Northern lynxes and Eurasian wolves for most of the history.

Some of the Koitajoki trails (Tapion taival) go by the area.

== See also ==
- Scandinavian and Russian taiga
