= Outsider (rapper) =

South Korean rapper (born 1983)

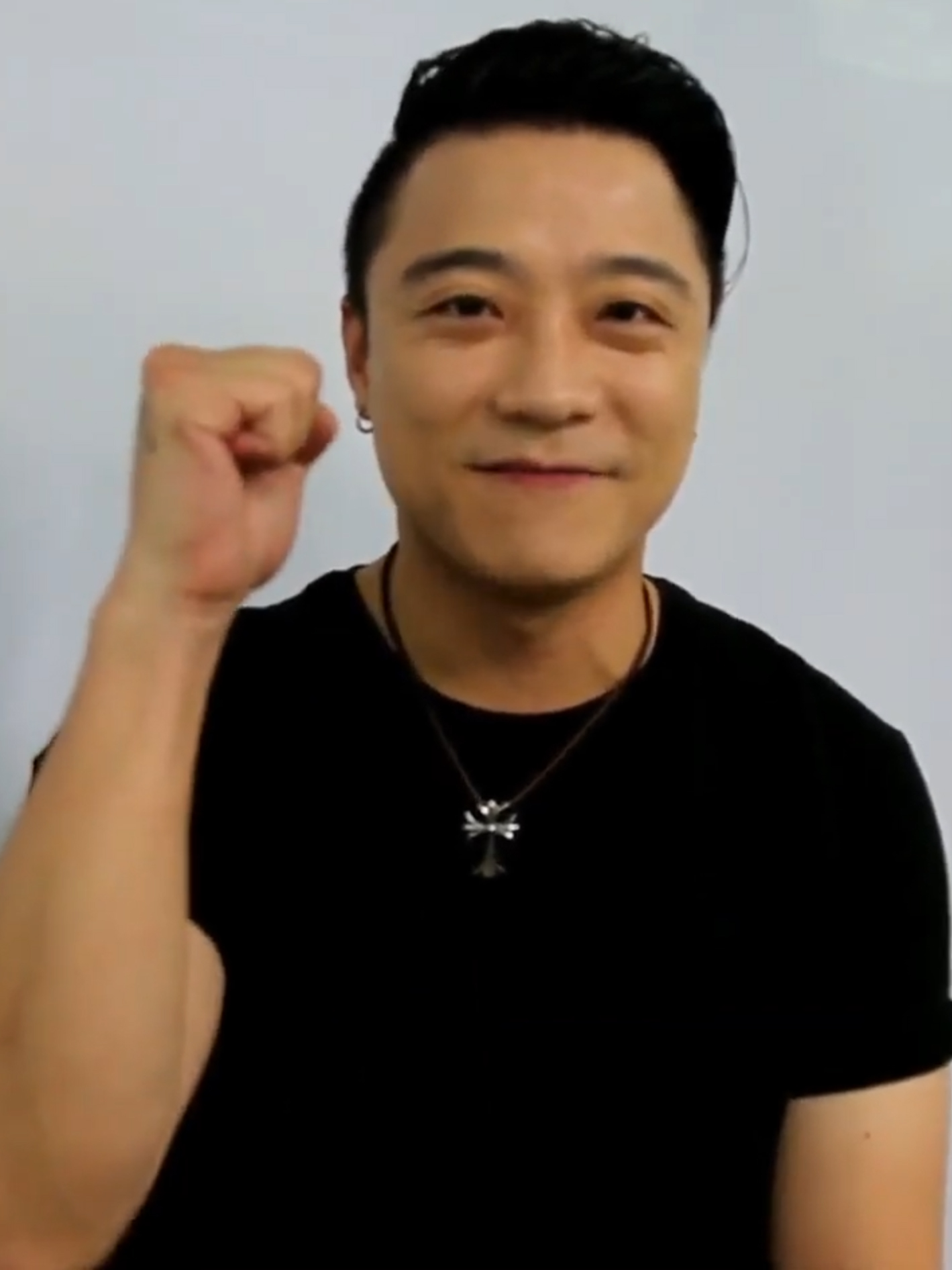
- Outsider in 2019

Background information
- Born: Shin Ok-cheol; March 21, 1983 (age 42); Seoul, South Korea
- Genres: Hip hop
- Occupation: Rapper
- Years active: 2004–present
- Labels: Sniper Sound; ASSA Communication

Korean name
- Hangul: 신옥철
- RR: Sin Okcheol
- MR: Sin Okch'ŏl

Shin Ok-cheol (Korean: 신옥철; born March 21, 1983), known by his stage name Outsider (아웃사이더), is a South Korean rapper. He is known for his speed-rapping and is able to rap at over 16 syllables per second. After a conflict between Outsider and MC Sniper's label, Sniper Sound, in July 2013, he was also the founder of Blockbuster Records and its successor, ASSA Communication.

== Career ==
=== 2004–2008: Discovery and Soliloquist ===
In 2004, Outsider began his career as an underground rapper and achieved some success with his debut EP "Come Outside". He released his first single "Speed Star" in 2006 and promoted the title track, "Motivation", on the SBS variety show The Truth Game. His fast rapping skills impressed Korean hip-hop legend, MC Sniper, who signed Outsider to his label, "Sniper Sound". On October 25, 2007, Outsider released his first full-length studio album, Soliloquist.

=== 2008–2009: Maestro and mainstream success ===
After a year hiatus, Outsider's second album, released June 1, 2009, Maestro, had more mainstream success. The title track "Loner" held the #1 spot on both the Mnet and Melon music charts for more than five weeks, making Outsider one of the fastest rappers to reach #1 on Korean music charts. Outsider has performed on MBC, SBS, KBS, Mnet, and had appeared on SBS's Star King as a special guest. After the promotion for "Loner" ended, he started to promote another track from the same album titled "My Youth Confession"; the track was successful. Outsider has worked with underground and overground rappers such as MC Sniper, L.E.O, Illnit, DJ R2, Bae Chi Gi, Dok2, and more. He also did a special performance alongside singer K.Will.

=== 2010–2012: The Outsider, Hero and military service ===
After a short hiatus, he returned on March 2, 2010, to release an EP titled "Vol. 2.5 The Outsider" along with a music video for the album's single, "Acquaintance" (주변인), in which Outsider revisits the sound of "Loner", which mixes hip-hop with a classical edge. During this period, he garnered publicity for his remake of Big Bang's "Lies". He was also featured on a charity single entitled "Faddy Robot Foundation" with Vasco, Verbal Jint, Sangchu, Yong Junhyung, Joosuc, Hyuna, and Zico.

On October 21, 2010, he released his 3rd album titled "Hero" along with two singles; "주인공 (Hero)" featuring fellow label-mate, LMNOP, and "Attitude Needed When Breaking Up" (이별할 때 필요한 자세) featuring fellow hip-hop artist, Kuan of All That. The album garnered success, despite being released without a music video or many live performances to promote the album. The song "Hero" rose to #7 on the Mnet Single Charts, #5 on Melon, and #4 on the prestigious Gaon Chart. On December 21, 2010, Outsider enlisted for mandatory military service for five weeks of basic training followed by 21 months of active duty in Wonju. He was discharged on September 24, 2012.

=== 2013–present: Rebirth Outsider and Sniper Sound conflict ===
In June 2013, after a three-year hiatus, Outsider announced plans to release his 4th studio album in July. On June 25, 2013, Outsider pre-released the single "Crying Bird" featuring Lee Soo Young.

On July 4, 2013, Outsider filed a lawsuit against Sniper Sound over financial issues. In a press release, Outsider claimed he never received proper pay or credit for his various activities and copyrights. Sniper Sound in turn filed an opposing lawsuit against Outsider calling him to halt his recent activities. The conflict broke when fans were unable to buy Outsider's previous songs from 2007 to 2010 released under MC Sniper's Sniper Sound because they were no longer available.

On July 22, 2013, despite the conflict with his former label, Outsider made his first official comeback after being discharged from the military with the mini album "Rebirth Outsider" under his own label "ASSA Communication". The album's title track Bye U features G.O. of MBLAQ as Outsider's first idol collaboration. The album also features San E, Tymee (formerly E.via) and more.

== Personal life ==
Outsider was married on March 31, 2012, at Seoul's Gangnam Imperial Palace Hotel. His wife, Lee Yongbin (이영빈) is director of a dance troupe as well as the CEO of a cultural contents enterprise.

He has a daughter who was born on March 9, 2016. They appeared on KBS reality show 'The Return of Superman' in 2017 (Ep191-192) as special guests.

It was revealed in 2024 that Outsider and his wife divorced in 2020.

== Discography ==
=== Studio albums ===
Title	Album details	Peak chart positions	Sales
Title	Album details	KOR	Sales
Soliloquist	Released: October 25, 2007; Label: Sniper Sound; Format: CD; Track listing: 1. "Show (Skit)"; 2. "Innovation"; 3. "One Way" (feat. MC Sniper); 4. "Mr. Liar"; 5. "남자답게 (Like a Man)"; 6. "나락에 핀 꽃 (Fallen Flowers)"; 7. "쩐 (Money)" (feat. Moowoong of Baechigi); 8. "우리 형 (My Brother)"; 9. "사랑할 수 있을까 (Can I love you)" 10. "Hyper Soar" (Feat. Simon Dominic); 11. "Someone Like You" (Instrumental); 12. "연인과의 거리 (Distance Between Lovers)" (Feat. 샛별); 13. "Perfect Love" (Feat. Mr. Room 9 & MC BK); 14. "Remember the Name" (Feat. One Stone); 15. "난 행복해 (I'm Happy)" (Feat. K-Proud)	25	KOR: 5,702+
Maestro	Released: June 1, 2009; Label: Sniper Sound; Format: CD; Track listing: 1. "Vj 특공대" (Skit); 2. "Zero to Hero"; 3. "City Hunter" (Feat. Basick & Carry.D); 4. "청춘 고백 (Youth's Confession)" (Feat. Joy); 5. "외톨이 (Loner)"; 6. "피에로의 눈물 (Pierro's Tears)" (Feat. Moowoong of Baechigi); 7. "Therapist" (Feat. Illinit); 8. "Bleeding Luv" (Feat. Kuan); 9. "Skit"; 10. "불만증 (Dissatisfaction)" (Feat. Eunhyul); 11. "Luv Business" (Feat. J'Kyun & Bizniz); 12. "Face Off" (Feat. MC Sniper); 13. "Value of the Man" (Feat. Deffinite); 14. "음악밖에 없어 (Nothing but Music)"; 15. "Speed Racer" (feat. KEIKEI, Kirbytrap, CSP, Masio, Huckleberry P, JJK, LEO, Illinit, Diz'one, Deffinite, Jebag, LMNOP, FANA, MARCO, Taktak36 of Baechigi and Kyfish)	No data*	KOR: 23,200+
Hero (주인공)	Released: October 21, 2010; Label: Sniper Sound; Formats: CD, digital download; Track listing: 1. "Hit Me" (Feat. Illinit); 2. "주인공 (Hero)" (Feat. LMNOP); 3. "가면무도회 (Masquerade Ball)" (Feat. Park Mi-Kyung); 4. "Go Go Sing" (Feat, Whale); 5. "이별할 때 필요한 자세 (What to do when Breaking Up)" (Feat. Kuan); 6. "피에로의 눈물 3 (Pierro's Tears 3)" (Feat. RIMI); 7. "소년이여 (Boy)" (Feat. 샛별); 8. "Skit"; 9. "진짜 (That's right)" (Feat. Sunday 2PM); 10. "S.O.B." (Feat. Jebag & San E); 11. "롤러코스터 (Rollercoaster)" (Feat. Yohan); 12. "선물 (Gift)" (Feat. KEIKEI); 13. "Everlasting" (Feat. Curious, KEIKEI, Kuan, Sunday 2PM & LMNOP); 14. "세상 밖으로의 항해 (Voyage out of the World)" (Feat. LEO & KEIKEI); 15. "꿈의 대화 (Your Dream)" (Feat. 주변인)	7	—
Pride & Prejudice	Released: March 12, 2015; Label: ASSA Communication; Formats: CD, digital download; Track listing: 1. "Along with the Wind" (Feat. Lee Eun-Mee); 2. "Duel of Century" (Feat. 2Tak); 3. "Star Warz" (Feat. Twista); 4. "Freedom" (Feat. Sapo); 5. "Octagon" (Feat. 2Tak, Tymee, Bewhy & Kuan); 6. "Tattoo of Memento"; 7. "20 (Pride & Prejudice)"; 8. "Red Carpet - Original Version"; 9. "Son"; 10. "Touch the Love" (Feat. Hwayobi); 11. "Tattoo" (Feat. Navi); 12. "Crying Bird" (Feat. Lee Soo-Young); 13. "Fire of Delight" (Feat. Jo Hyun A & Curious); 14. "Red Carpet - J Star Version" (Feat. Jung Kyung-Ho); 15. "Along with the Wind" (Instrumental)	41	—
HISTORIA	Released: February 21, 2025; Label: OGAM Entertainment; Formats: Digital download; Track listing: 1. "HISTORY" (Feat. MC Sniper); 2. "DMF (Just the way you are)" 3. "N.A" (Feat. Kan Jong Wook); 4. "from Zero" (Feat. NO.I); 5. "무대포 (Break The Stage)" (Feat. VOK (Jang Moon-Bok) & Jung Sang Soo); 6. "늙은 개 2025 Remix (Old Dog)"; 7. "늑대 개 (The Wolf Dog, Shall we Dance?)"; 8. "GIRL" (Feat. Kim Jae Joong); 9. "멀어져 (Further Away)" (Feat. GilGu); 10. "Think of U" (Feat. Jung Yi Han); 11. "Don't far away" (Feat. Kim Myung Hoon; 12. "Diving (가위바위보)" (Feat. VOK [Jang Moon Bok]); 13. "연인과의 거리 3 (Distance Between Lovers 3)" (feat. Cheon Dan Bi & Wooju); 14. "살다가 살아가 (Life Goes On)" (feat. Kan Jong Wook); 15. "HISTORY" (Solo Version)	No data*	—
*Data not available for 2009 and 2025.

=== Reissued albums ===
Title	Album details	Peak chart positions	Sales
Title	Album details	KOR	Sales
Become Stronger Pride and Prejudice reissue	Released: April 18, 2016; Label: ASSA Communication; Formats: CD, digital download	65	—

=== Extended plays ===
Title	Album details	Peak chart positions	Sales
Title	Album details	KOR	Sales
Come Outside	Released: January 6, 2004; Label: OGAM Entertainment; Formats: CD, cassette; Track listing: 1. "Come Outside" (Feat. MC.Ha); 2. "편지 (Letter)"; 3. "운수좋은날 (Lucky Day)" (Feat. Azz Chef); 4. "In The Night" (Feat. 37908); 5. "다시 나를 사랑하기를 (Love me Again)" (Feat. Cross); 6. "Since 1983"; 7. "Only the Microphone"; 8. "너에게 (To You)" (Feat. HEESU & Lonie Jay); 9. "# Skit"; 10. "Life Goes On" (Feat. I.D Technic)	—	—
Speed Star	Released: February 16, 2006; Label: OGAM Entertainment; Formats: CD, cassette; Track listing: 1. "Motivation"; 2. "Music Makes Me High" (Feat. Soulman & Baechigi); 3. "연인과의 거리 (Distance Between Lovers)" (Feat. 샛별 & Brown Sugar); 4. "Unsigned Hype" (Feat. Deepflow & DJ KubiX); 5. "Motivation" (Instrumental); 6. "연인과의 거리 (Distance Between Lovers)" (Instrumental); 7. "Unsigned Hype" (Instrumental); 8. "연인과의 거리 (Distance Between Lovers)" (Acappella)	—	—
주변인: The Outsider	Released: March 2, 2010; Label: Sniper Sound; Formats: CD, digital download; Track listing: 1. "달빛의 노래 (Moonlight Song)" (Intro); 2. "주변인 (Acquaintance)"; 3. "피에로의 눈물2 (Pierro's Tears 2)" (Feat. Gilme); 4. "바람이 불면 너가 떠올라 (Think of you when the Wind Blows)" (Feat. Ilac); 5. "일장춘몽 (A Time Limited Life)"; 6. "주변인 (Acquaintance)" (Instrumental); 7. "외톨이 (Loner)" (Instrumental)	6	—
Rebirth Outsider	Released: July 23, 2013; Label: ASSA Communication; Formats: CD, digital download; Track listing: 1. "Prologue"; 2. "Bye U" (Feat. G.O. of MBLAQ); 3. "그리움을 만지다 (Touch the Love)" (Feat. Hwayobi); 4. "Memoride" (Feat. Tymee & San E); 5. "엘도라도 (Eldorado)" (Feat. KEIKEI & Hee-Young Jang); 6. "Epilogue"	6	KOR: 4,577+
"—" denotes release did not chart.

=== Singles ===
Title	Year	Peak chart positions	Sales	Album	
Title	Year	KOR	Sales	Album	
As lead artist
"Lucky Day" (운수 좋은 날) feat. Azz Chef	2004	—	—	Come Outside	
"Music Makes Me High" feat. Baechigi, Soulman	2006	—	—	Speed Star single album	
"Like a Man" (남자답게)	2007	—	—	Soliloquist	
"Loner" (외톨이)	2009	—	—	Maestro	
"Acquaintance" (주변인)	2010	4	—	주변인: The Outsider	
"Think of you when the Wind Blows" (바람이 불면 너가 떠올라) feat. Ilac	2010	53	—	주변인: The Outsider	
"Hero" (주인공) feat. LMNOP	2010	20	—	Hero	
"Crying Bird" (슬피 우는 새) feat. Lee Soo-young	2013	7	KOR: 620,366	Pride and Prejudice	
"Bye U" feat. G.O of MBLAQ	2013	16	KOR: 103,363	Rebirth Outsider	
"Hand" (손)	2014	25	KOR: 117,384	Pride and Prejudice	
"Tattoo" (문신) feat. Navi	2015	70	KOR: 44,428	Pride and Prejudice	
"Cloud" (구름) feat. Mellow	2015	—	KOR: 14,934	Non-album single	
"A Flower of the Days" (피고 지는 날들) feat. La Muse	2016	—	—	Become Stronger	
"Become Stronger" feat. Kuan	2016	—	—	Become Stronger	
"Spitting" (카악 퉤) feat. Yoon Hyun-min	2016	—	—	Non-album singles	
"Street Love" feat. Kangnam	2017	—	—	Non-album singles	
"3.14" feat. Kim Myung-hoon of Ulala Session	2018	—	—	Non-album singles	
"The Wolf Dog (Shall we Dance?)" (늑대개)	2022	—	—	늙은 개, 늑대 개 - Single	—
"Old Dog (2021 Remix)" (늙은 개)	2022	—	—	늙은 개, 늑대 개 - Single	
"Loner 2022" (외톨이 2022 온 누리에 누리호)	2022	—	—	Non-album single	
Collaborations
"Heart Disease" (심장병) with MC Sniper, Horan	2009	—	—	Hwantastic Project	
"My Old Story" (나의 옛날이야기) with MC Sniper	2010	49	—	The Artist	
"Please Don't Go" (가면 안돼) with San E, Lee Chang-min	2011	14	—	Non-album singles	
"The Weather is Good" (날씨가 좋아) with RapStar	2014	—	—	Non-album singles	
"Star Warz" (별들의 전쟁) with Twista	2015	—	—	Pride and Prejudice	
"By the Wind" (바람곁에) with Lee Eun-mi	2015	—	KOR: 13,045	Pride and Prejudice	
"Away" (멀어져) with AA	2019	—	—	Non-album single	
"D.M.F" (Just the way you are) with ARKAY	2020	—	—	Non-album single	
"Just Good" (그냥 좋아) with KCM	2021	—	—	Non-album single	
"Break The Stage" (무대포) with VOK (Jang Moon-Bok) & Jung Sang Soo	2024	—	—	Non-album single	
"Diving" (가위바위보) with VOK (Jang Moon-Bok)	2024	—	—	Non-album single	

== Filmography ==
=== Variety show ===
Year	Title	Network	Role	Note
2020	King of Mask Singer	MBC	Contestant	as "The Last Leaf" (episode 287)

== Awards and nominations ==
=== Mnet Asian Music Awards ===
Year	Category	Work	Result
2009	Best Hip Hop Performance	"Loner"	Nominated
2010	Best Rap Performance	"Outsider"	Nominated
