= Pisavaara Strict Nature Reserve =

Nature reserve in Finland

- IUCN category Ia (strict nature reserve)
- Location within Finland
- Location: Rovaniemi and Tervola, Lapland, Finland
- Coordinates: 66°16′54″N 25°5′43″E
- Area: 49 km^{2} (19 sq mi)
- Established: 1956
- Governing body: Metsähallitus

Pisavaara Strict Nature Reserve (Pisavaaran luonnonpuisto) is a strict nature reserve located in Rovaniemi and Tervola municipalities in Lapland, Finland. This varied reserve includes the southernmost arctic biotope in Finland, as well as totally unmanaged forests of both southern and northern Finnish types. There is no public access.
