= Salamanperä Strict Nature Reserve =

Protected area in Finland

- IUCN category Ia (strict nature reserve)
- Location within Finland
- Location: Central Finland, Finland
- Coordinates: 63°12′28″N 24°47′51″E
- Area: 13 km^{2} (5.0 sq mi)
- Established: 1956
- Governing body: Metsähallitus

Salamanperä Strict Nature Reserve (Salamanperän luonnonpuisto) is home to Wolverine and Finnish Forest Reindeer (R. tarandus fennicus), and it is said that wolves can be heard while in the nature reserve. It has a trail, but the distance of the trail is unknown as of now. This nature reserve is connected to Salamajärvi National Park and is a strict nature reserve. It is located in the Central Finland region of Finland.
