= Maltio Strict Nature Reserve =

Protected area in Finland

- IUCN category Ia (strict nature reserve)
- Location within Finland
- Location: Lapland, Finland
- Coordinates: 67°23′42″N 28°43′23″E
- Area: 148 km^{2} (57 sq mi)
- Established: 1956
- Governing body: Metsähallitus

Maltio Strict Nature Reserve (Maltion luonnonpuisto) is a strict nature reserve located in Lapland, Finland. It has been used to study the relation of reindeers and predators. At Maltio is lot of bird species.
