= Runkaus Strict Nature Reserve =

Nature reserve in Lapland, Finland

- IUCN category Ia (strict nature reserve)
- Location within Finland
- Location: Lapland, Finland
- Coordinates: 66°2′49″N 25°31′34″E
- Area: 70 km^{2} (27 sq mi)
- Established: 1956
- Governing body: Metsähallitus

Runkaus Strict Nature Reserve (Runkauksen luonnonpuisto) is an internationally recognized nature reserve in Lapland, Finland. It is also a Natura 2000 site, and a Key Biodiversity Area.

The site was established in 1956 and was recognized by the International Union for Conservation of Nature in 1973. It became a Natura 2000 site in 1998. It is located south of the Kemijoki, and has an area of 7050 hectare, consisting of 75% wetland and 25% forest. It plays a key role in protecting the biodiversity of the region, as it contains ten protected habitats- including string bogs, fens, springs, rivers, dystrophic lakes, and taiga- as well as six protected species, including the Eurasian otter. Many bird species of the region also rely upon the preserve, especially when breeding. However, the area is expected to be severely impacted by climate change.
