= Matti Makkonen =

Finnish engineer

Matti Makkonen (16 April 1952 – 26 June 2015) was a Finnish engineer in the field of mobile communications. He was employed (among others) by Nokia Networks and the then Telecom Finland (branded as Tele), as well as Finnet Oy. Makkonen played a leading role in creating the mobile communication unit of what is today TeliaSonera. In 2008, Makkonen was awarded The Economist Innovation Award in the computing and telecommunications category for his work on text messaging (SMS).

== Career ==
Sources: Makkonen was born in Suomussalmi. He graduated as an electrical engineer from Oulu University in 1976. Subsequently, he worked at the Telecoms and Postal agency (PTL, TeliaSonera) as a systems engineer, developing wireless communications services for the NMT mobile networks (1976–1983). He was also the vice president of PTL 1984–1988 and at the same time actively involved in the development of the GSM-technology until 1988. He became the president of the mobile communication unit in 1989, which had been renamed Telecom Finland. He also served as the vice president of the Mobile Communications Group during 1995–2000. In 2000, he was briefly the president and board member of the Mobile Internet operator unit of the company, which at that point had been renamed Sonera.

As of November 2000, Makkonen joined Nokia Networks Professional Services as the units director. He later became the CEO of Finnet Oy on 1 February 2003, a position which he held until 31 October 2005.

At the beginning of 2006, Makkonen served as a board member and consultant for Tieto-X and the PR agency Evia.

Makkonen was the president and CEO of ICT company Anvia from August 2010 to the spring of 2013 when he left because of serious illness, and later retired.
