= Ulvinsalo Strict Nature Reserve =

Protected area in Finland

- IUCN category Ia (strict nature reserve)
- Location within Finland
- Location: Kainuu, Finland
- Coordinates: 63°58′21″N 30°22′28″E
- Area: 25 km^{2} (9.7 sq mi)
- Established: 1956
- Governing body: Metsähallitus

Ulvinsalo Strict Nature Reserve (Finnish: Ulvinsalon luonnonpuisto) is located in the Kainuu region of Finland. Wild forest reindeer (Rangifer tarandus fennicus) has been living here for ages. There is a trail in the park, but using it requires a permit.
