= Olvassuo Strict Nature Reserve =

Protected area in Finland

- IUCN category Ia (strict nature reserve)
- Location within Finland
- Location: Finland
- Coordinates: 65°6′45″N 27°16′4″E
- Area: 71 km^{2} (27 sq mi)
- Established: 1981
- Governing body: Metsähallitus

Olvassuo Strict Nature Reserve (Olvassuon luonnonpuisto) encompasses 71 square kilometres (27 mi^{2}) in the Northern Ostrobothnia and Kainuu regions of Finland. It is situated inside a larger, 270 km^{2} (100 mi^{2}) protected area. It was designated in 1981.

The reserve is part of Natura 2000 and Ramsar programmes.
