= Pelso =

Pelso may refer to:

- Lake Pelso (Latin: Lacus Pelso), the modern Lake Balaton
- Pelso Strict Nature Reserve in Finland
- Pelso Plate in the Carpathian Basin
