= 1956 in Finland =

- Decades: 1930s; 1940s; 1950s; 1960s; 1970s
- See also: Other events of 1956; Timeline of Finnish history

Events in the year 1956 in Finland.

== Incumbents ==
- President: Juho Kusti Paasikivi (until 1 March); Urho Kekkonen (starting 1 March)
- Prime Minister: Urho Kekkonen (until 3 March); Karl-August Fagerholm (starting 3 March)

== Events ==
- Finland participated in the 1956 Summer Olympics, from 22 November to 8 December 1956, in Melbourne, Australia. The team of 72 Finns included 64 competitors. They won a total of 15 medals.

== Establishments ==
- Eino Leino Prize.
- Fagerholm II Cabinet.
- Häädetkeidas Strict Nature Reserve.
- Käpylän Pallo.
- Museum of Finnish Architecture.
- Palloiluseura Apollo.
- Salon Palloilijat.

== Births ==
- 19 April - Juhani Himanka
- 24 September - Tapio Levo
- 20 October - Leo Palin
