= Vaskijärvi Strict Nature Reserve =

Protected area in Finland

- IUCN category Ia (strict nature reserve)
- Location within Finland
- Location: Southwest Finland, Finland
- Coordinates: 60°50′38″N 22°15′4″E
- Area: 15 km^{2} (5.8 sq mi)
- Established: 1956
- Governing body: Metsähallitus

Cygnus cygnus swimming in Kajavajärvi lake, in Vaskijärvi National Reserve, Yläne, Finland

Vaskijärvi Strict Nature Reserve (Finnish: Vaskijärven luonnonpuisto) is located in southwestern Finland.

The nature reserve covers an area of approximately 10 square kilometers (4 square miles) and is known for its rugged landscape and high biodiversity. It was established in 1956 to protect the area's valuable forests, wetlands, and other natural features, and it is currently managed by the Finnish government's Metsähallitus agency. The reserve is a popular destination for hikers, birdwatchers, and nature enthusiasts, who come to enjoy its pristine wilderness and observe its many rare and endangered species.

The reserve offers several hiking trails of varying lengths and difficulty levels, ranging from easy walks to more challenging hikes.

The longest trail in the reserve is the 14 km Vaskijärvi Nature Trail, which is a circular trail that starts and ends at the reserve's parking lot. The Vaskijärvi Nature Trail passes through a variety of different landscapes, including spruce forests, pine heaths, and open mires.
