= Paljakka Strict Nature Reserve =

Protected area in Finland

- IUCN category Ia (strict nature reserve)
- Location within Finland
- Location: Kainuu, Finland
- Coordinates: 64°42′40″N 28°2′40″E
- Area: 30 km^{2} (12 sq mi)
- Established: 1956
- Governing body: Metsähallitus

Paljakka Strict Nature Reserve (Finnish: Paljakan luonnonpuisto) is a strict nature reserve located in the Kainuu region of Finland. It consists of old, high spruce forest, where the highest trees can reach 40 metres (130 ft). Finland's only orchid species, Cypripedium calceolus, grows in the Paljakka reserve.
