= 1955 in Finland =

- Decades: 1930s; 1940s; 1950s; 1960s; 1970s
- See also: Other events of 1955; Timeline of Finnish history

Events in the year 1955 in Finland.

== Incumbents ==
- President: Juho Kusti Paasikivi
- Prime Minister: Urho Kekkonen

== Establishments ==
- Evia Oyj.
- Finnish Cup.

== Events ==
- 23 December – The first film adaptation of Väinö Linna's novel The Unknown Soldier, directed by Edvin Laine, was premiered.

== Births ==
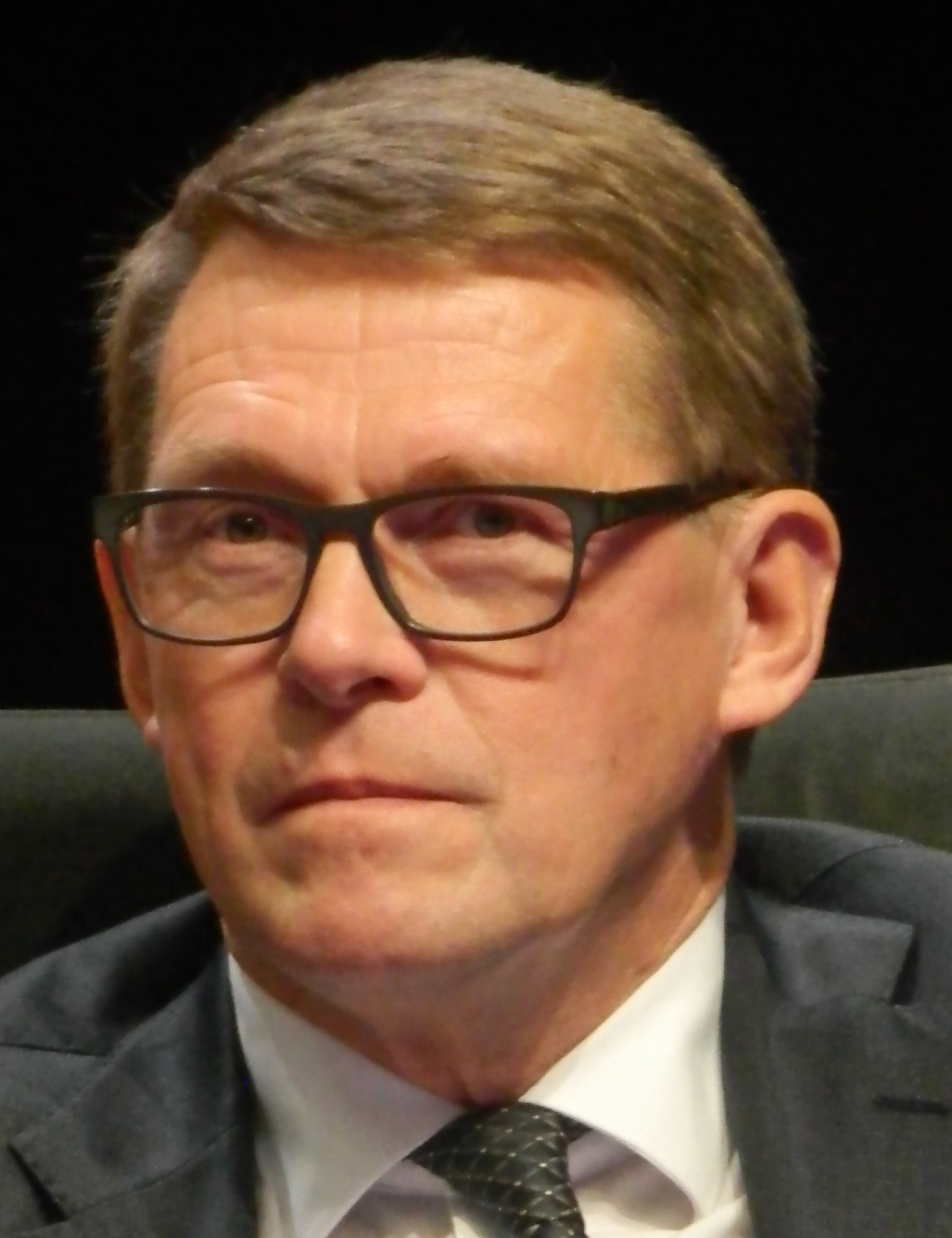
Matti Vanhanen

- 15 August - Anne Marie Pohtamo.
- 4 November - Matti Vanhanen.
- 19 November - Reima Salonen.
- 15 December - Pentti Kokkonen.

== Deaths ==
- 28 February – Isak Penttala, politician (b. 1883)
