= Värriö Strict Nature Reserve =

Protected area of Finland

- IUCN category Ia (strict nature reserve)
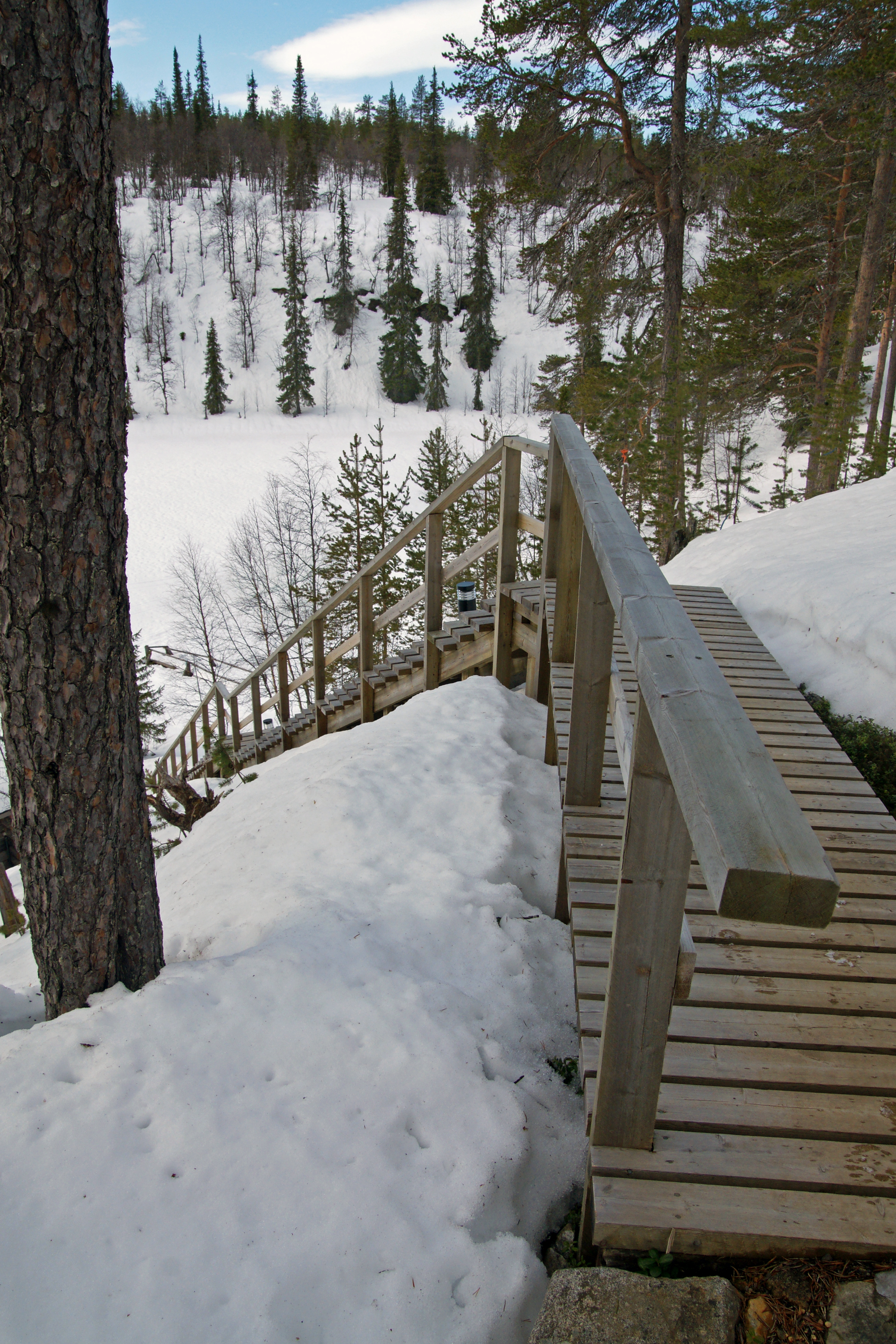
- View from Värriö Research Station

- Location within Finland
- Location: Lapland, Finland
- Coordinates: 67°44′16″N 29°38′58″E
- Area: 125 km^{2} (48 sq mi)
- Established: 1982
- Governing body: Metsähallitus

Värriö Strict Nature Reserve (Värriön luonnonpuisto) of Lapland, Finland, was established in 1981. Moving within the natural park happens under license. In the area there is a research station and the only way to go there is by trail. Field studies are carried out to investigate reindeer herding and predators, such as wolves and wolverines. This Strict Nature Reserve is 12,500 hectares in size.

== See also ==
- Värriö-pages, finnish
