= Pelso Strict Nature Reserve =

Nature reserve in Finland

- IUCN category Ia (strict nature reserve)
- Location within Finland
- Location: Northern Ostrobothnia, Finland
- Coordinates: 64°26′4″N 26°14′22″E
- Area: 19 km^{2} (7.3 sq mi)
- Established: 1982
- Governing body: Metsähallitus

Pelso Strict Nature Reserve (Finnish: Pelson luonnonpuisto) is a strict nature reserve located in Northern Ostrobothnia, Finland. The swampy reserve is noted for its bird fauna.
