= MAMA Award for Best Rap & Hip Hop Performance =

MAMA Award for Best Rap & Hip Hop Performance (베스트 랩 퍼포먼스)
- Awarded for: quality rap or hip hop performances
- Country: South Korea
- Presented by: CJ E&M Pictures (Mnet)
- First award: 1999
- Currently held by: Big Naughty – "MUSIC" (featuring Lee Chan-hyuk) (2025)
- Website: Mnet Asian Music Awards

The MAMA Award for Best Rap & Hip Hop Performance (베스트 랩 퍼포먼스) is an award presented annually by CJ E&M Pictures (Mnet). It was first awarded at the 1st Mnet Asian Music Awards ceremony held in 1999; the band Honey Family won the award for their song "Man's Story – My Way", and it is given in honor for the band with the most artistic achievement in rap or hip hop performances in the music industry.

The category was formerly named Best Hip Hop Performance from 1999 to 2009, Best Rap Performance from 2010 to 2016, and Best Hip Hop & Urban Music from 2017 to 2022.

== Winners and nominees ==
Year^{[I]}	Winner(s)	Song	Nominee(s)
Best Hip Hop Performance
1999 (1st)	Honey Family	"Man's Story – My Way"	Drunken Tiger - "Do You Know Hip-Hop"; BROS - "Win Win"; Cho PD - "Fever"; g.o.d - "Dear Mother"
2000 (2nd)	DJ DOC	"D.O.C Blues"	2000 Korea (2000 대한민국) - "Emergency" (비상); 1TYM - "One Love"; Lee Hyun-do (이현도) - "Pierrot" (삐에로); Cho PD - "날 잊어 2"
2001 (3rd)	Drunken Tiger	"Good Life"	CB Mass - "Real"; Yun Hui-jung (윤희중) - "My Life"; Joosuc - "Last Man Standing"; Jinusean - "A-yo"
2002 (4th)	Leessang	"Rush" (featuring Jung-in)	1TYM - "Nasty"; MC Sniper - "BK Love"; Cho PD - "My Style"; Joosuc - "Infinity" (무한대)
2003 (5th)	Kim Jin-pyo	"With a Dogged Spirit"	Drunken Tiger - "Because I'm A Man" (남자기 때문에); Leessang - "Leessang Blues" (리쌍부르스); Eun Ji-won - "Drunken In Melody"; Cho PD - "Secret Diary" (비밀일기)
2004 (6th)	Cho PD (Note: Titled "Best Hip Hop Video" award.)	"Friend" (featuring Insooni)	Dynamic Duo - "Ring My Bell"; Drunken Tiger - "Liquor Shots"; Epik High - "Peace Day" (평화의 날); MP Allstarz - "Change The Game"
2005 (7th)	Epik High	"Fly" (featuring Amin. J)	Drunken Tiger - "Isolated Ones! Left Foot Forward!"; Leessang - "I'm Not Laughing" (내가 웃는게 아니야); Joosuc - "Hip Hop Music" (힙합뮤직); Jinusean - "Phone Number" (전화번호)
2006 (8th)	MC Mong	"Ice Cream"	Dynamic Duo - "Go Back"; Baechigi - "Turn A Deaf Ear"; Yang Dong-geun (YDG) - "Go To Hong Kong"; Uptown - "My Style"
2007 (9th)	Epik High	"Fan"	Leessang - "Ballerino" (featuring Ali); Big Bang - "Lies"; Drunken Tiger - "8:45 Heaven"; Dynamic Duo - "Attendance Check"
2008 (10th)	Epik High	"One" (featuring Ji Sun)	Dynamic duo - "Solo" (featuring Alex); Mighty Mouth - "Energy"; Eun Ji-won - "Adios"; MC Mong - "Circus"
2009 (11th)	Leessang	"Can't Breakup Girl, Can't Breakaway Boy" (featuring Jung-in)	Dynamic Duo - "Guilty"; Tiger JK of Drunken Tiger - "Monster"; Outsider - "Loner"; Epik High - "Wannabe" featuring Mellow
Best Rap Performance
2010 (12th)	DJ DOC	"I'm This Kind of Person"	Epik High - "Run"; Outsider - "Outsider"; Supreme Team - "Dang Dang Dang"; UV - "Sorry I'm Not Cool"
2011 (13th)	Leessang	"Turned Off the TV" (featuring Yoon Mi-rae and Kwon Jung Yeol)	Clover - "La Vida Loca"; Mighty Mouth - "Tok Tok"; Simon D - "Cheerz"; Tablo - "Bad"
2012 (14th)	Epik High	"UP" (featuring Park Bom)	Dynamic Duo - "Without You"; Leessang - "Someday"; Mighty Mouth - "Bad Boy"; Verbal Jint - "You Deserve Better"
2013 (15th)	Dynamic Duo	"BAAAM" (featuring Muzie of UV)	Baechigi - "Shower of Tears"; Geeks - "Wash Away"; MFBTY - "Sweet Dream"; Verbal Jint - "If It Ain't Love"
2014 (16th)	Epik High	"Happen Ending"	Gary - "Shower Later"; Gaeko - "No Make Up"; Mad Clown - "Without You"; San E - "Body Language"
2015 (17th)	San E	"Me You"	Gary - "Get Some Air"; Dok2 - "Me"; Mad Clown - "Fire"; Jay Park - "Mommae"
2016 (18th)	C Jamm & BewhY	"Puzzle"	Gary – "Lonely Night"; DOK2 – "1llusion"; San E & Mad Clown – "Sour Grapes"; Zico – "I Am You, You Are Me"
Best Hip Hop & Urban Music
2017 (19th)	Heize	"Don't Know You"	Zico – "Artist"; Dean – "Come Over"; Mad Clown – "Lost Without You"; Woo Won-jae – "We Are"
2018 (20th)	Zico	"Soulmate" (featuring IU)	Dean – "Instagram"; Jay Park – "Soju"; Crush – "Bittersweet"; Heize – "Jenga"
2019 (21st)	Heize	"She's Fine"	Mino – "Fiancé"; Epik High featuring Crush and IU – "Love Drunk"; Woo Won-jae featuring Giriboy – "Taste"; Crush – "Nappa"
2020 (22nd)	Zico	"Any Song"	Giriboy - "Eul" (featuring BIG Naughty); Yumdda - "Amanda" (featuring Simon Dominic) (Prod. by UNTITLEDS); Lee Hi - "Holo"; Changmo - "Meteor"
2021 (23rd)	Ash Island	"Melody"	Changmo – "GJD"; Jessi – "What Type of X"; Mino – "Run Away"; Yumdda – "9ucci"
2022 (24th)	Jay Park	"Ganadara" (featuring IU)	Be'O - "Counting Stars" (featuring Beenzino); Big Naughty - "Beyond Love" (featuring 10cm); J-Hope - "More"; Zico - "Freak"
Best Rap & Hip Hop Performance
2023 (25th)	Agust D	"People Pt. 2" (featuring IU)	Ash Island - "Goodbye" (featuring Paul Blanco); J-Hope - "On the Street" (with J. Cole); Jay Park - "Candy" (featuring Zion.T); Zior Park - "Christian"
2024 (26th)	Zico	"Spot!" (featuring Jennie)	Dean – "Die 4 You"; Lee Young-ji – "Small Girl" (featuring D.O.); Leellamarz – "Boys Like Girls" (featuring Gist & Jayci Yucca); RM – "Lost!"
2025 (27th)	Big Naughty	"MUSIC" (featuring Lee Chan-hyuk)	Dynamic Duo and Gummy – "Take Care"; Haon – "Skrr" (feat. Giselle); PH-1 – "Life Is A Movie" (feat. Jung Ji-so); Tablo and RM – "Stop the Rain"

^{^[I]} Each year is linked to the article about the Mnet Asian Music Awards held that year.

== Gallery of winners ==
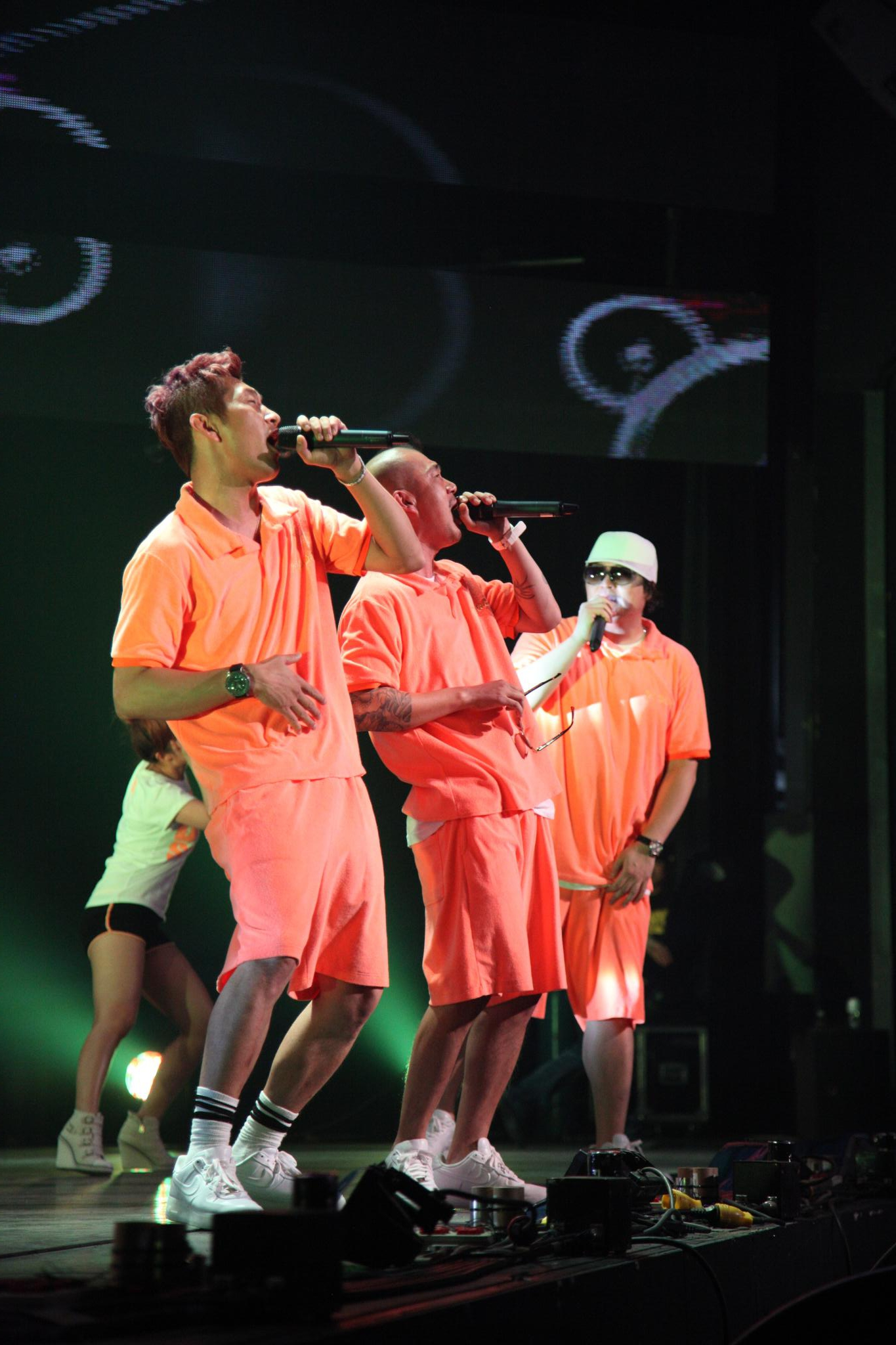
DJ DOC (2000, 2010)

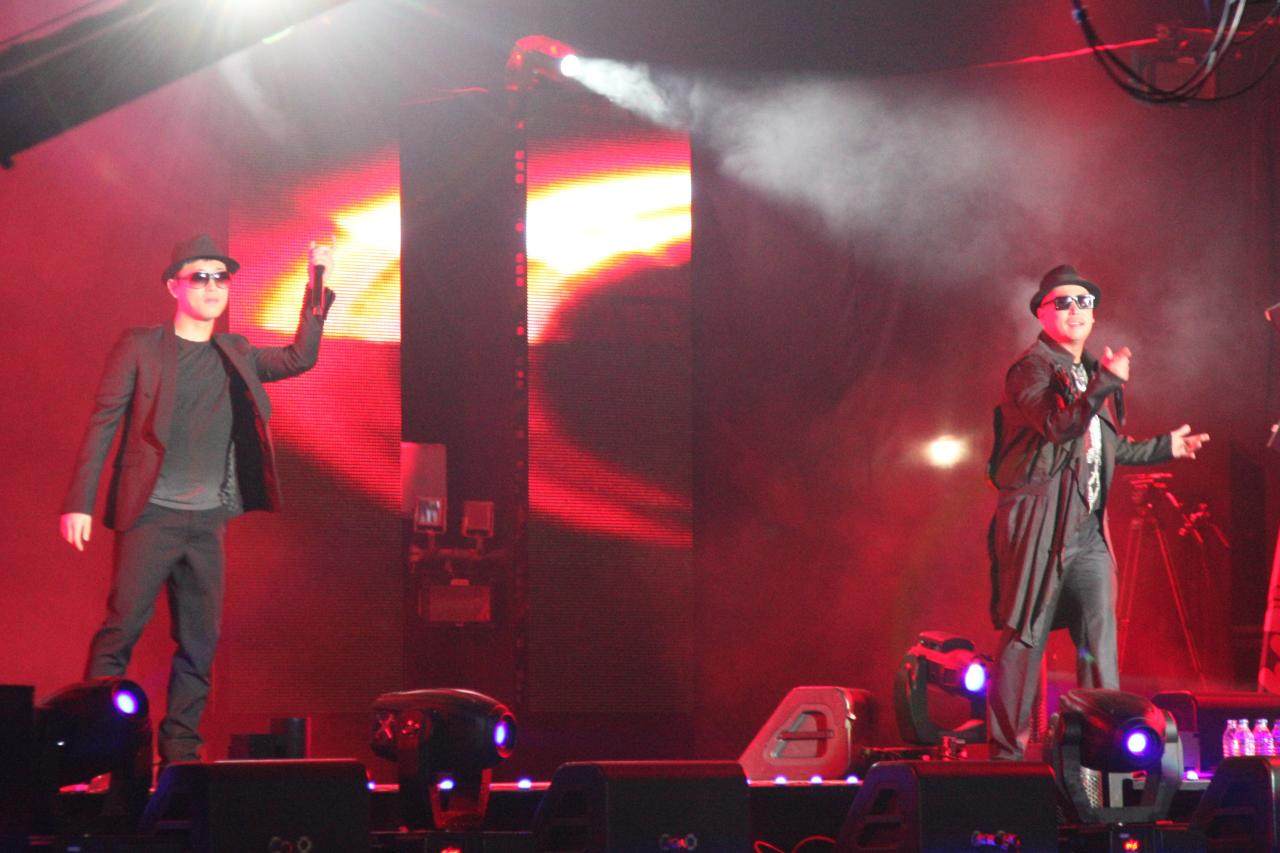
Leessang (2002, 2009, 2011)

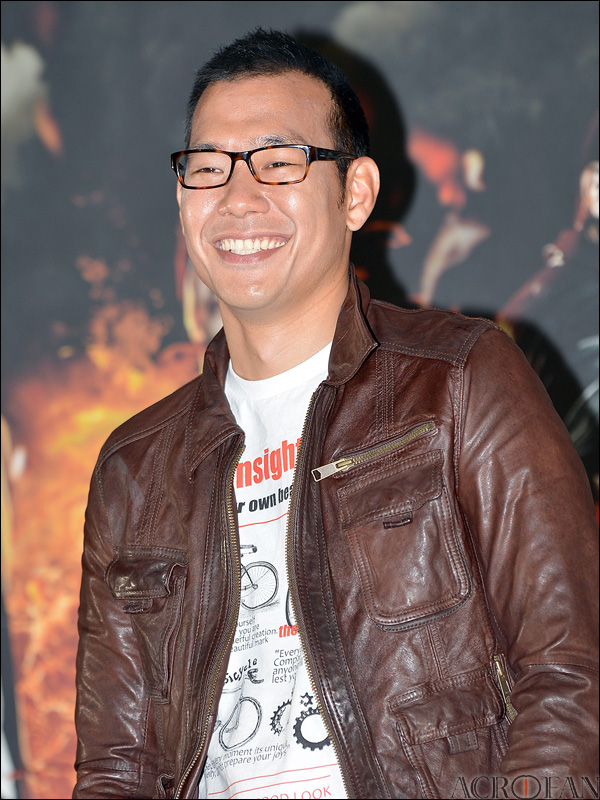
Kim Jin-pyo (2003)

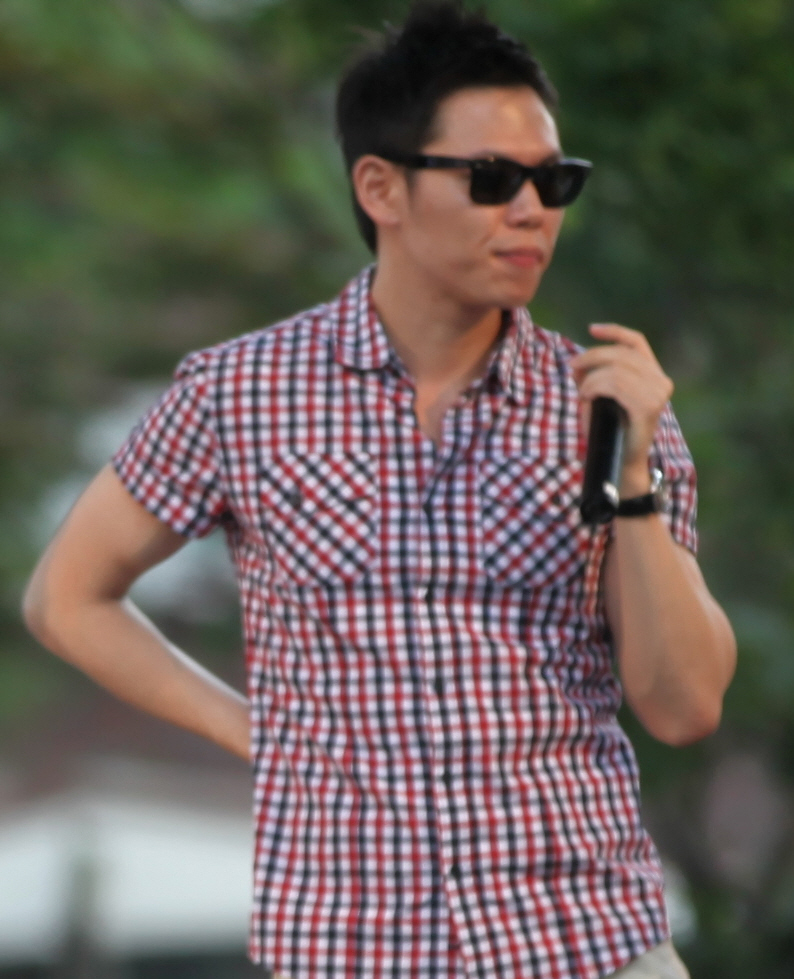
Cho PD (2004)

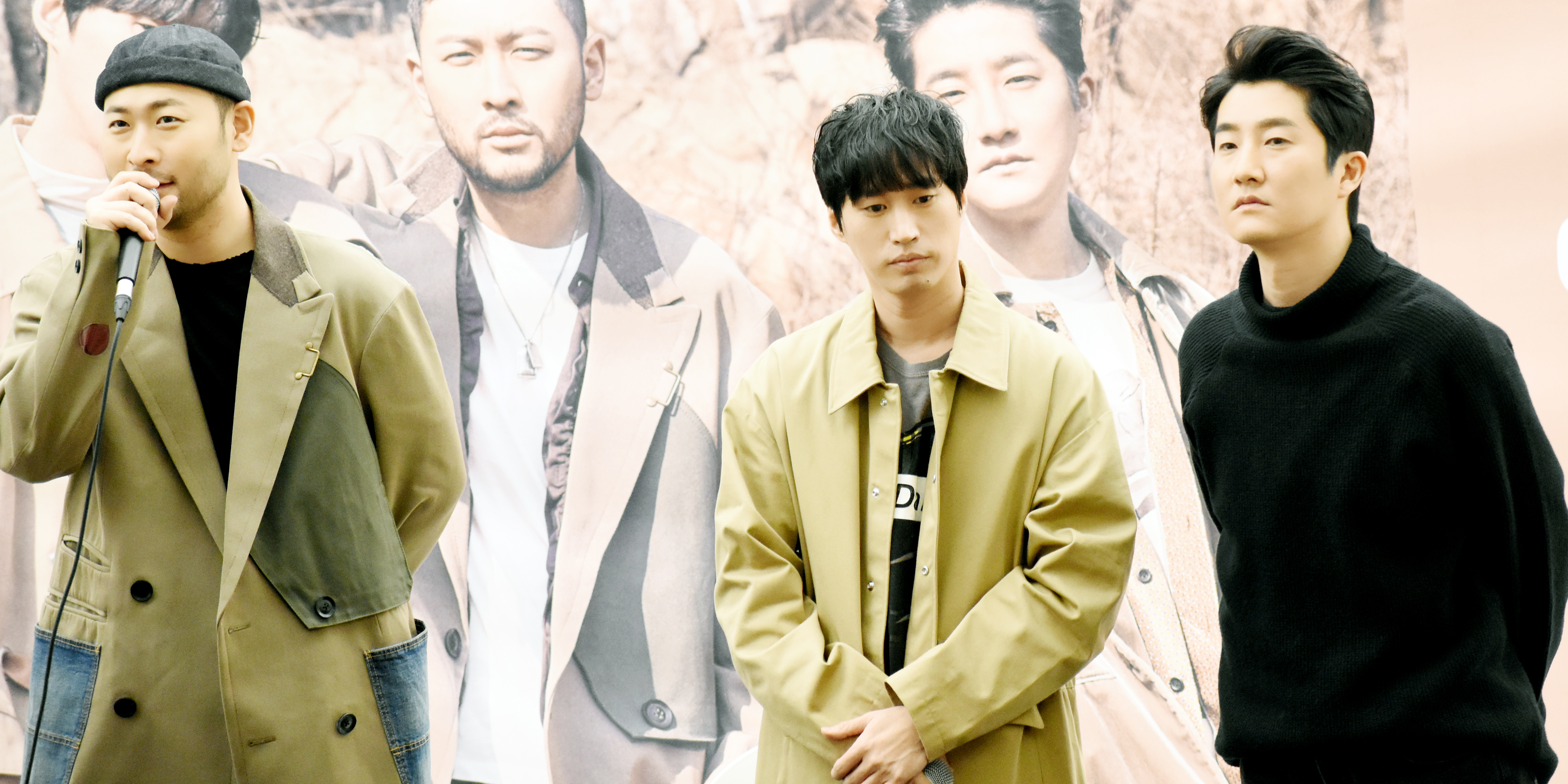
Epik High (2005, 2007–08, 2012, 2014)

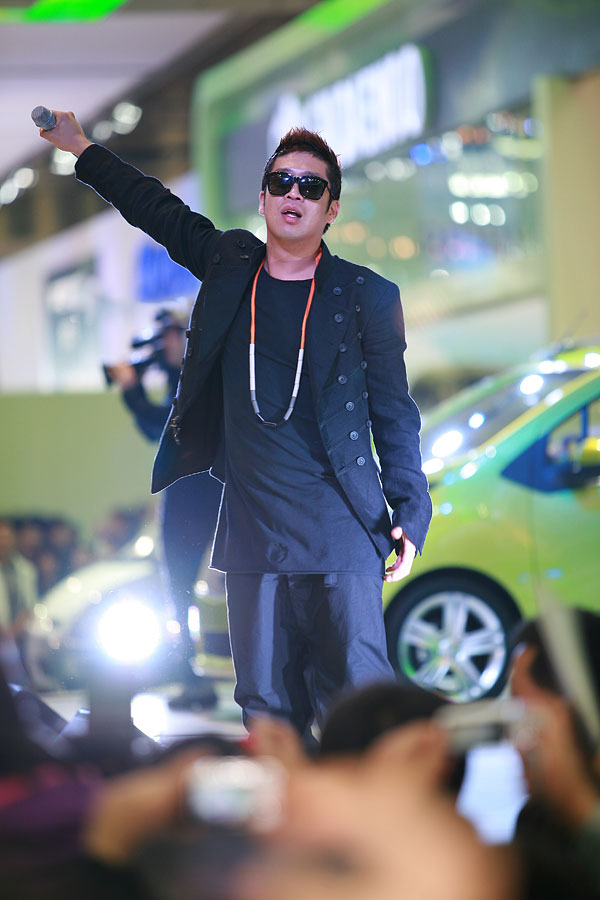
MC Mong (2006)

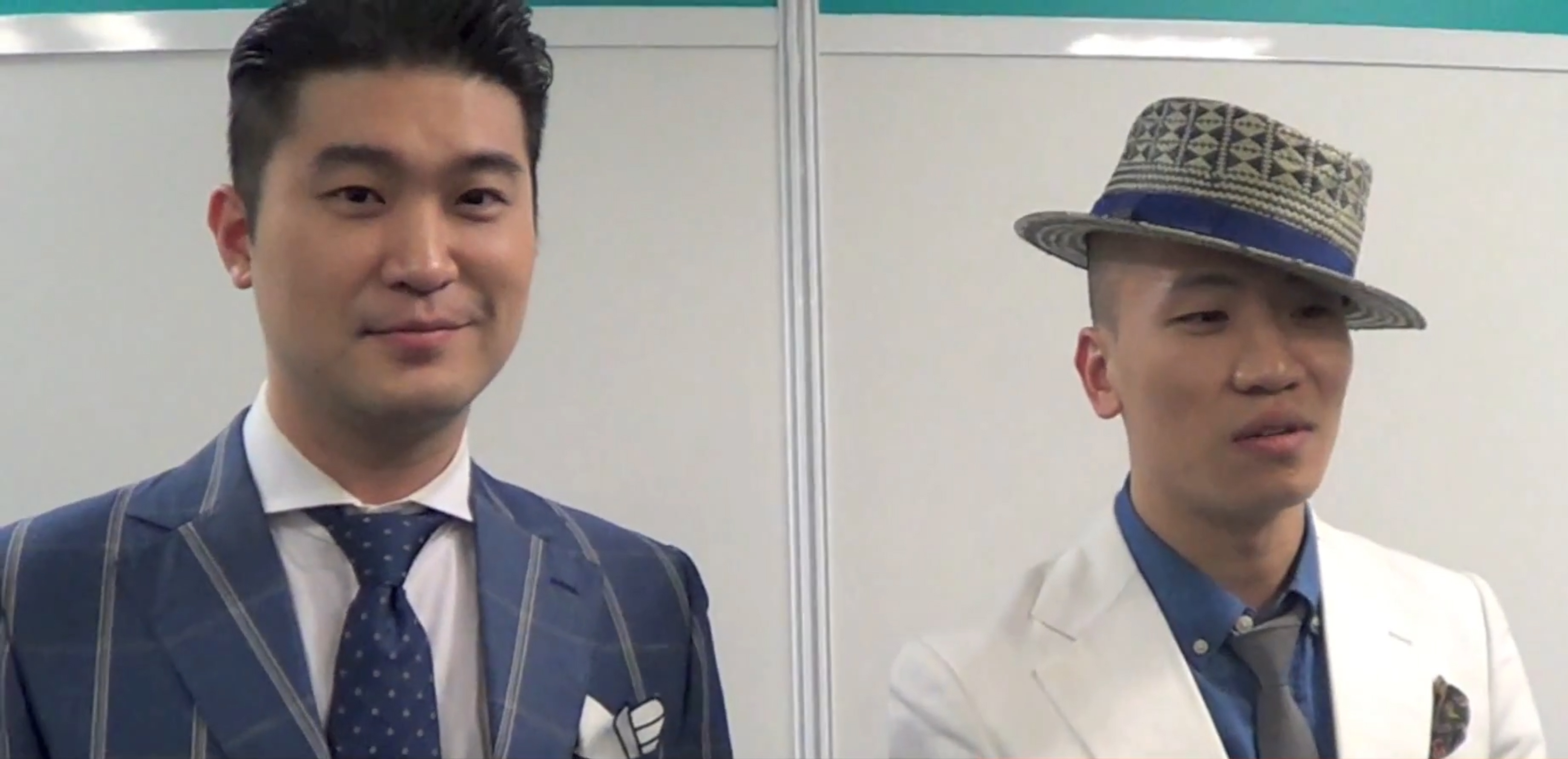
Dynamic Duo (2013)

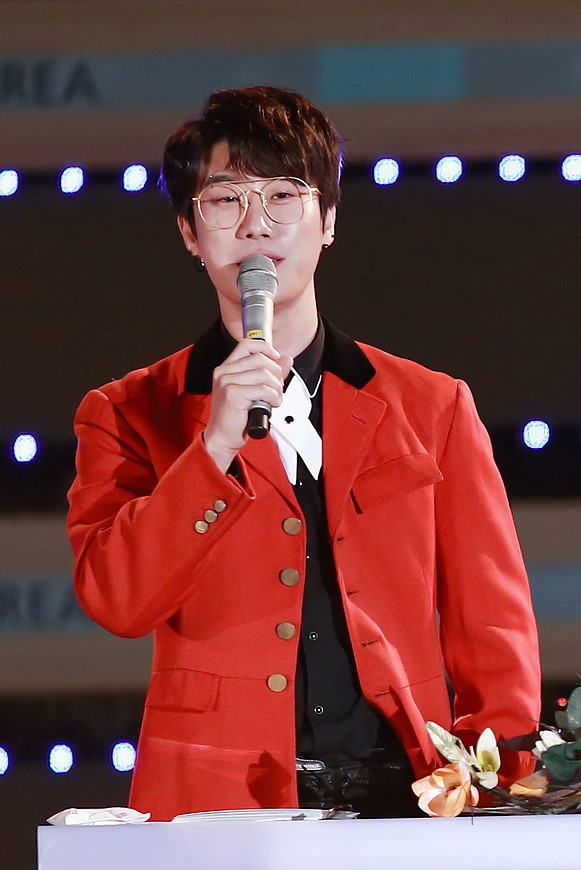
San E (2015)

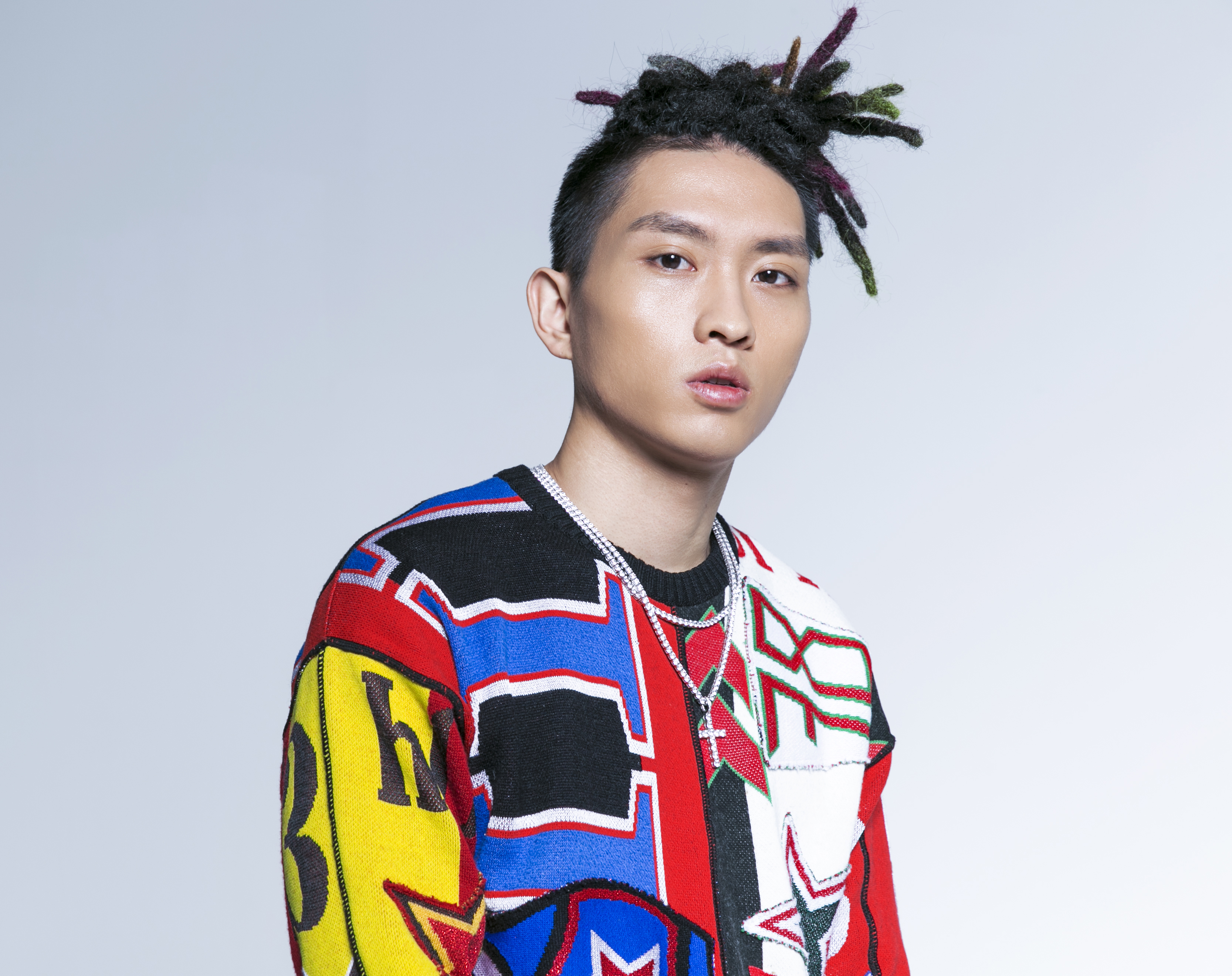
C Jamm (2016)

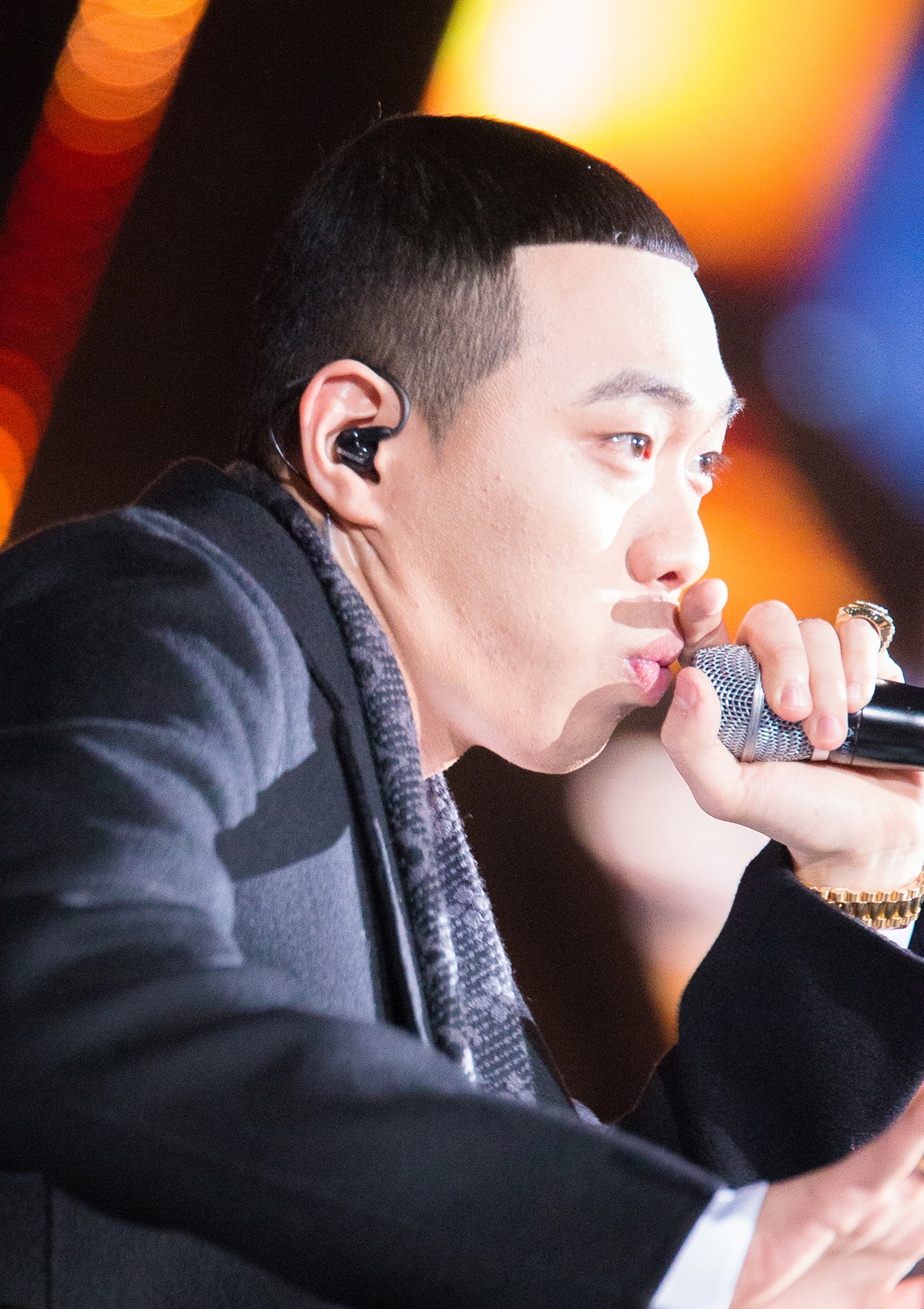
Bewhy (2016)

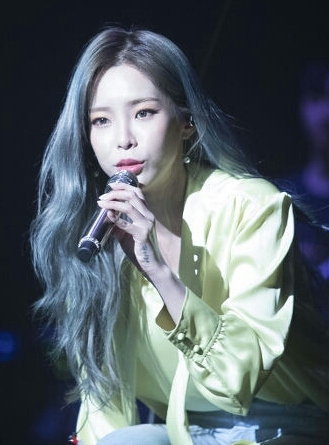
Heize (2017, 2019)

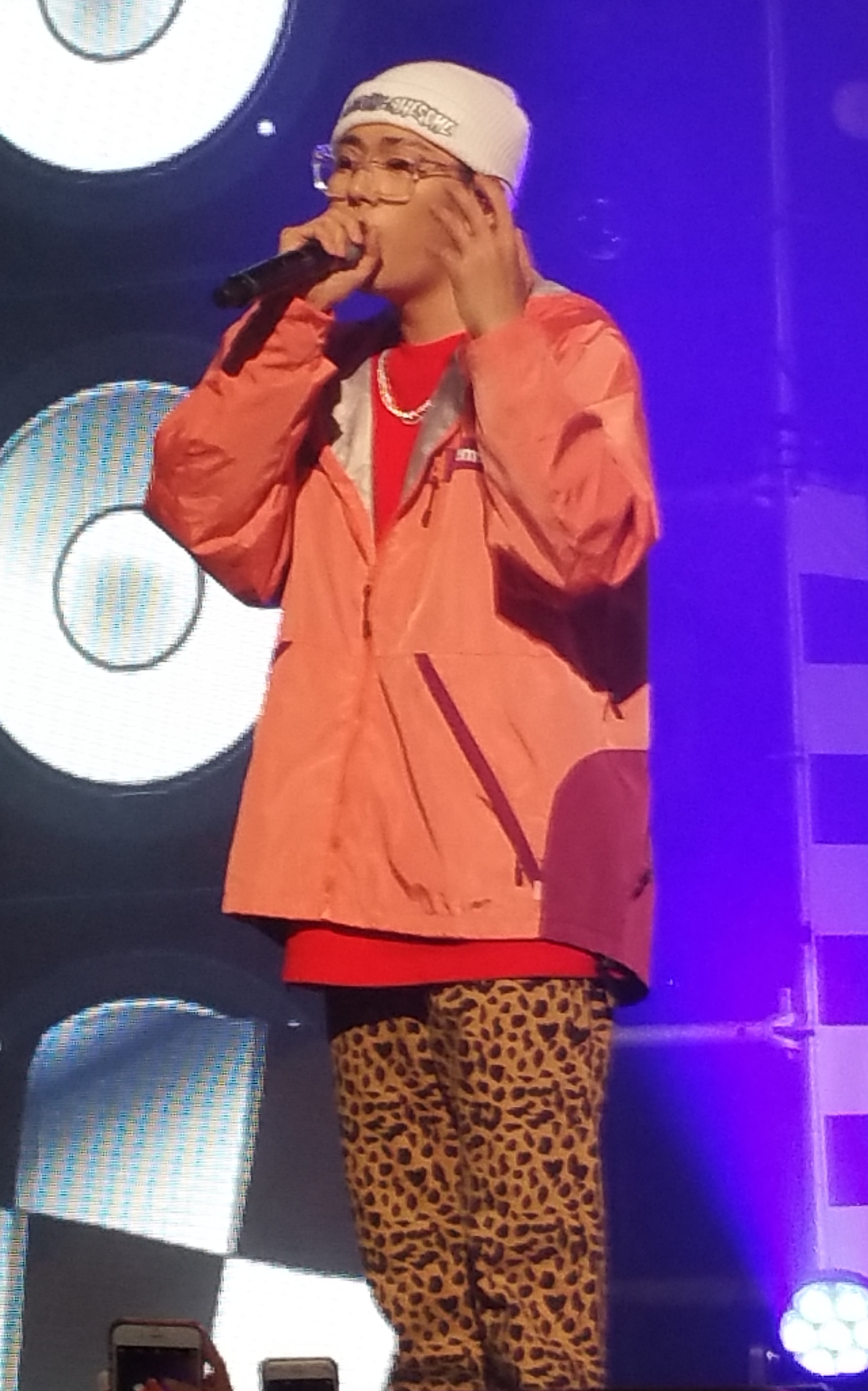
Zico (2018, 2020, 2024)

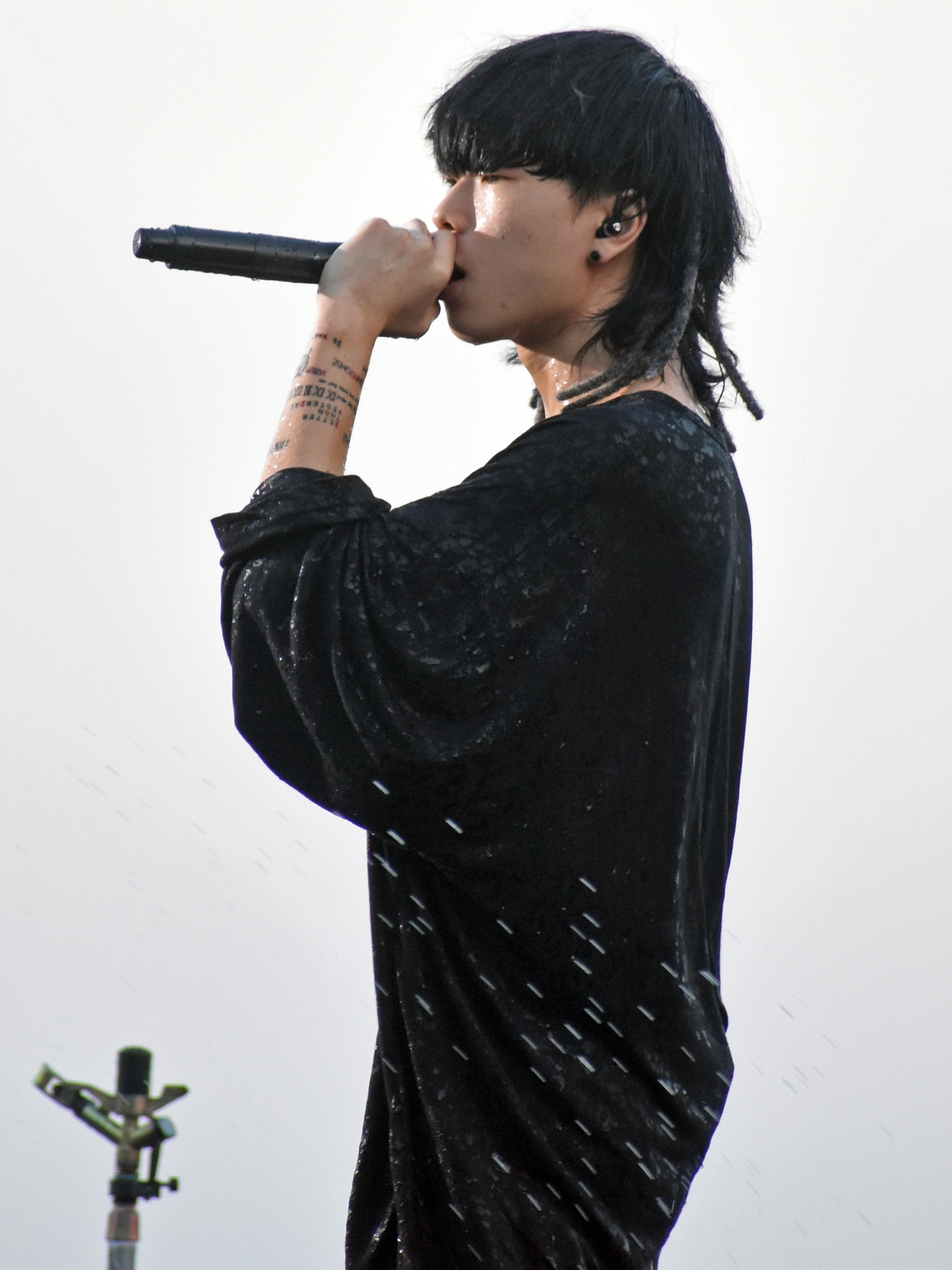
Ash Island (2021)

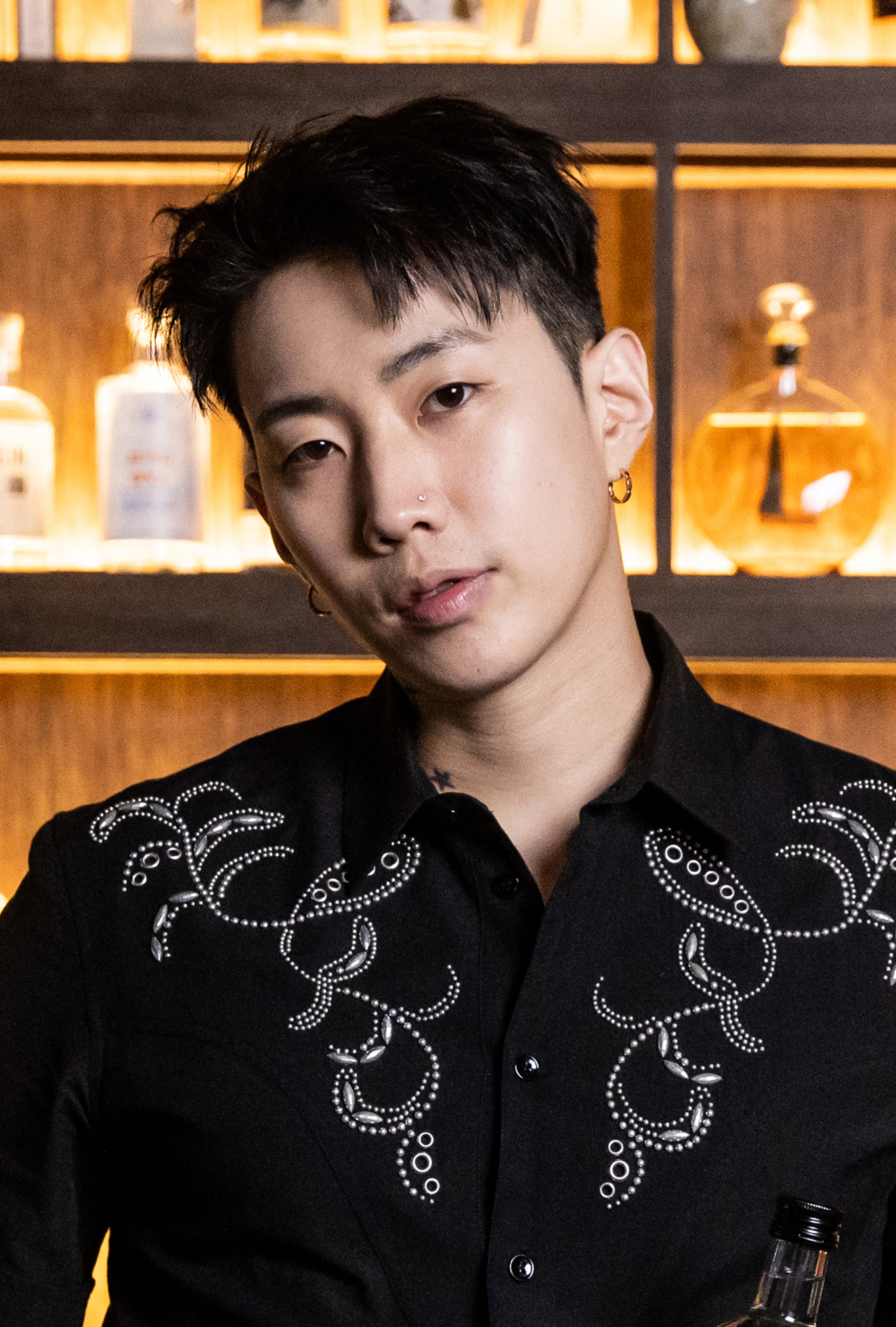
Jay Park (2022)

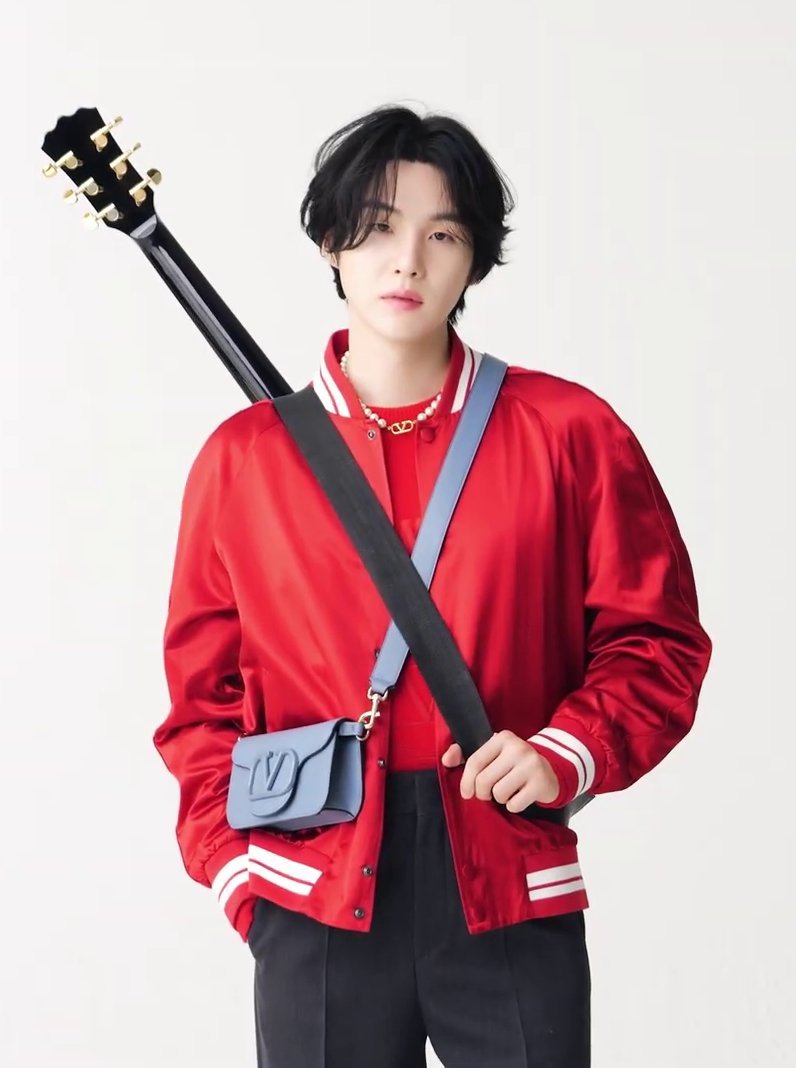
Agust D (2023)

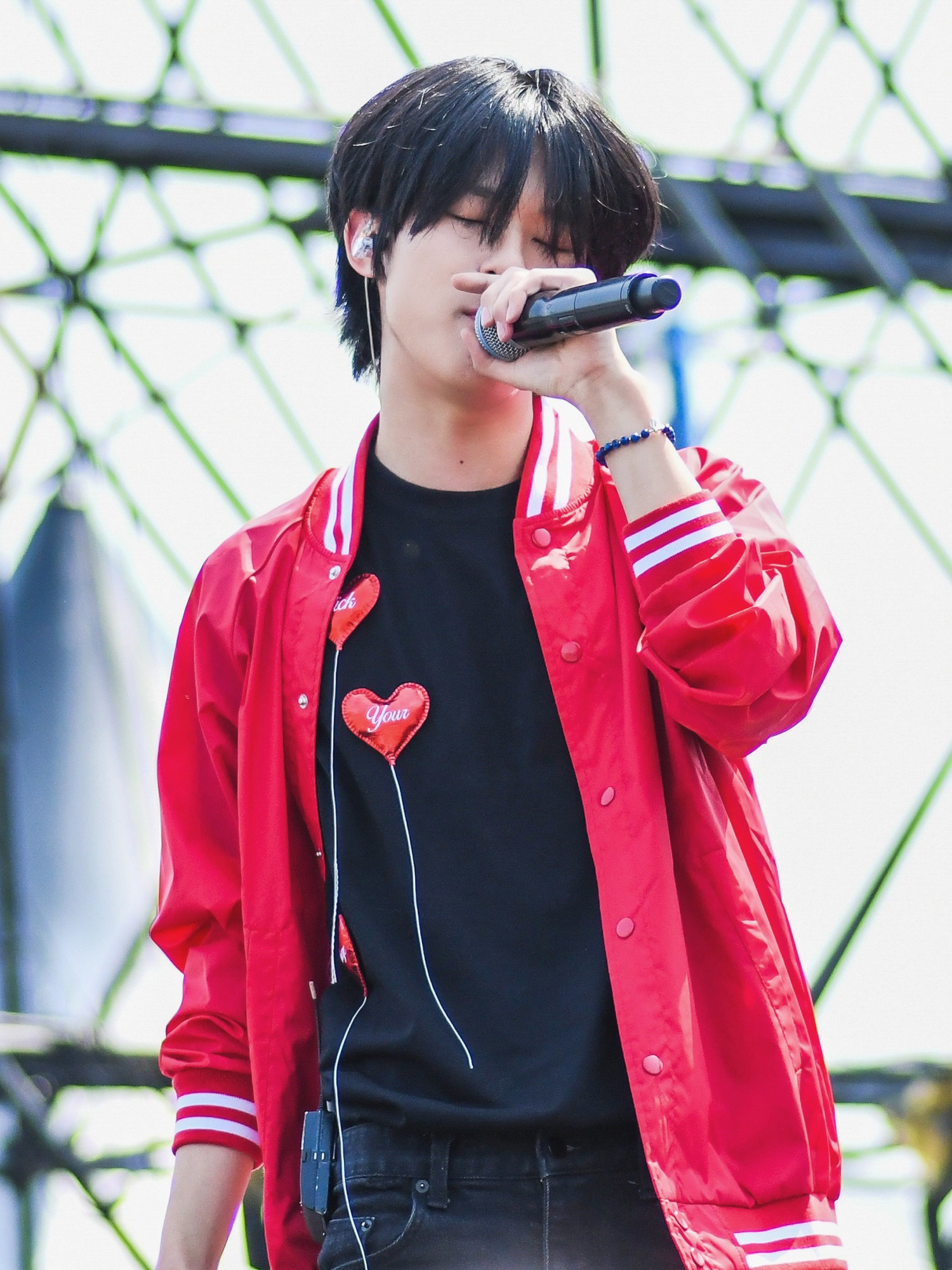
Big Naughty (2025)

== Multiple awards ==
As of 2020, five (5) artists received the title two or more times.

Artist	Number of wins	First year awarded	Most recent year awarded
Epik High	5	2005	2014
Leessang	3	2002	2011
Zico	3	2018	2024
DJ DOC	2	2012	2013
Heize	2	2017	2019
