= 1953 in Finland =

- Decades: 1930s; 1940s; 1950s; 1960s; 1970s
- See also: Other events of 1953; Timeline of Finnish history

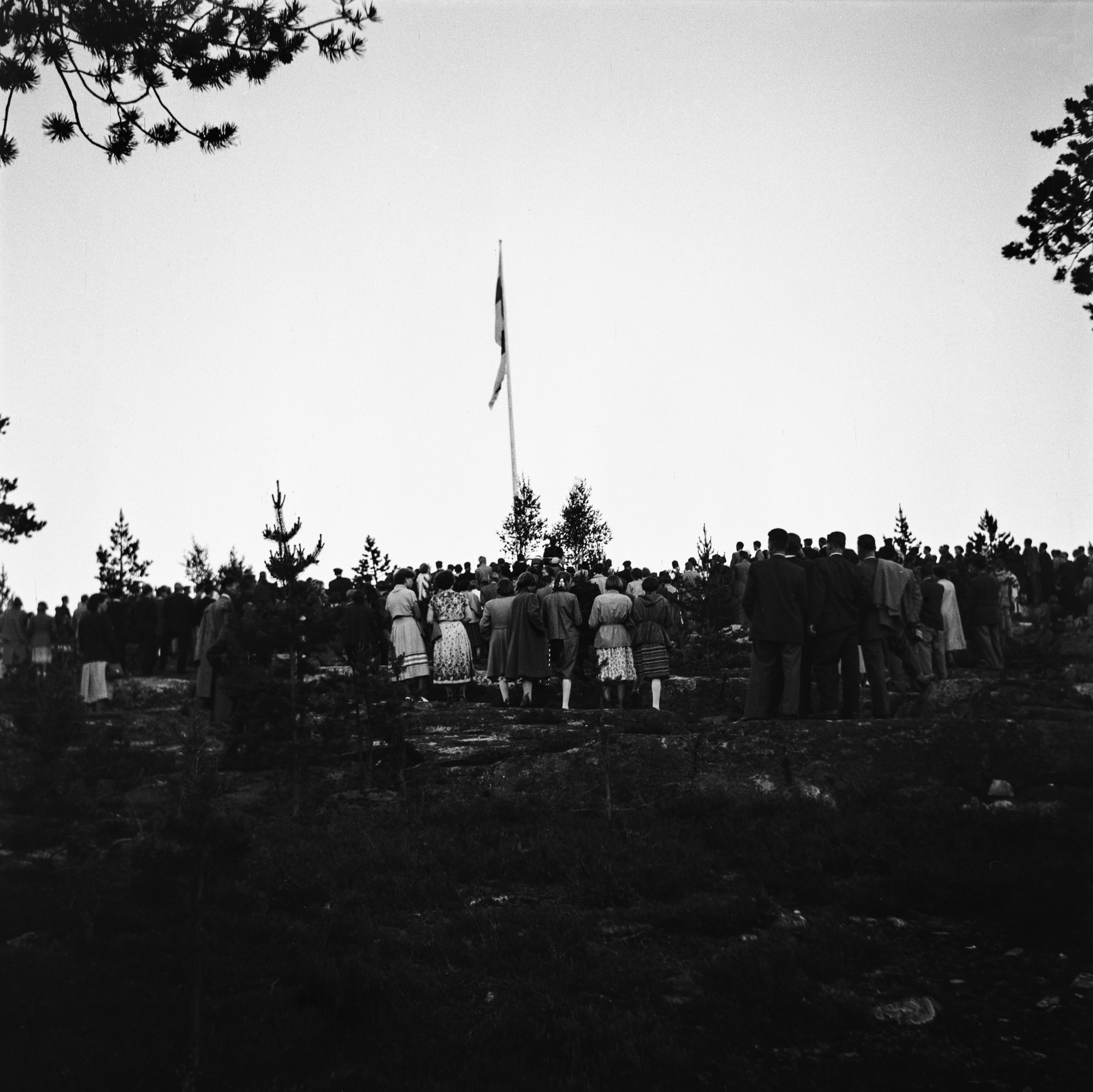
Rovaniemi, 1953

Events in the year 1953 in Finland.

== Incumbents ==
- President: Juho Kusti Paasikivi
- Prime Minister: Urho Kekkonen

== Establishments ==
- Finnish Footballer of the Year award (Football Association of Finland)

== Events ==
- 10 May – The 1953 Eläintarhanajot motor race is held at Eläintarha and is won by Rodney Nuckey (UK).

== Births ==
- 28 February – Osmo Vänskä, orchestral conductor and musician
- 22 April – Juhani Komulainen, composer

== Deaths ==
- 29 March – Väinö Kivisalo, politician (b. 1882)
