= Karkali Strict Nature Reserve =

Nature reserve in Lohja

- IUCN category III (natural monument or feature)
- Location within Finland
- Location: Uusimaa, Finland
- Coordinates: 60°14′26″N 23°48′2″E
- Area: 1 km^{2} (0.39 sq mi)
- Established: 1964
- Governing body: Metsähallitus

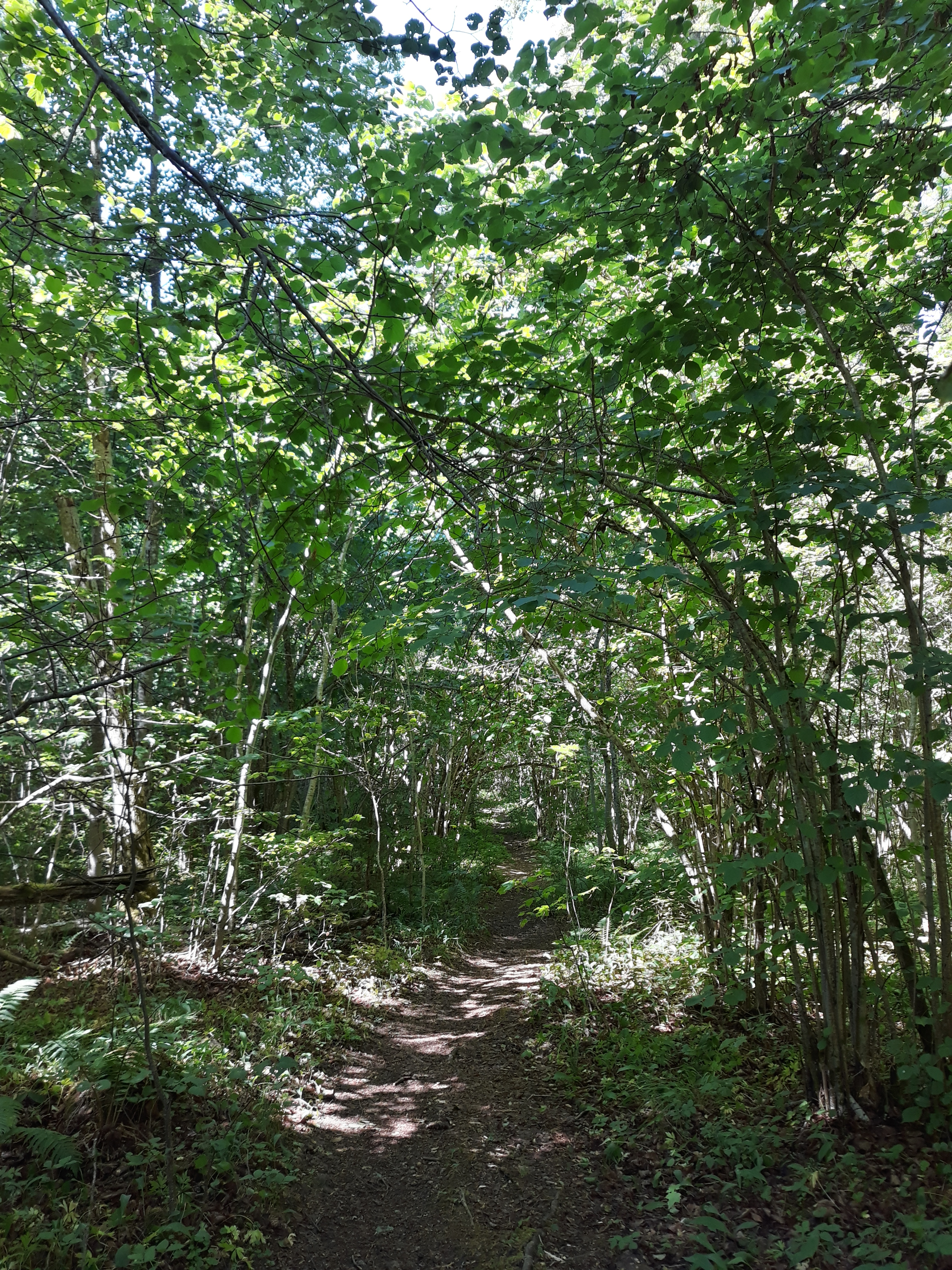

Karkali Strict Nature Reserve (Karkalin luonnonpuisto) is a strict nature reserve located in the Uusimaa region of Finland. This small reserve protects a lush deciduous forest more commonly found in central Europe.
