= Vesijako Strict Nature Reserve =

Strict nature reserve in Padasjoki, Finland

- IUCN category Ia (strict nature reserve)
- Location within Finland
- Location: Päijät-Häme, Finland
- Coordinates: 61°21′2″N 25°6′25″E
- Area: 1 km^{2} (0.39 sq mi)
- Established: 1956
- Governing body: Metsähallitus

Vesijako Strict Nature Reserve (Finnish: Vesijaon luonnonpuisto) is located in the Päijät-Häme region of Finland. This small reserve, near Lake Vesijako with two outlets in different watersheds, is noted for its geological features.
