= MC Sniper =

MC Sniper 김정유
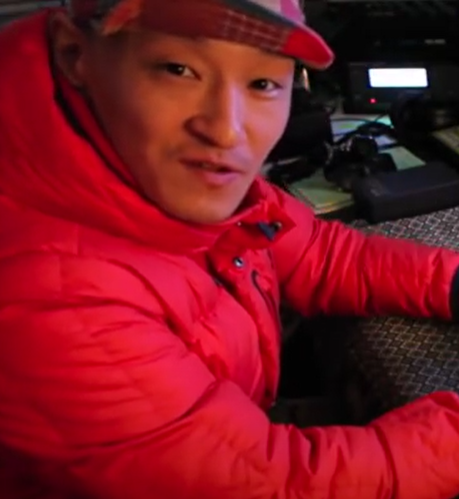
- MC Sniper in 2015

Background information
- Born: Kim Jung-yoo; February 8, 1979 (age 47)
- Origin: South Korea
- Genres: Hip hop Korean hip hop
- Occupation: Rapper
- Instrument: Vocals
- Years active: 2002–present
- Labels: B-Kite; Sniper Sound; Fluxus Music; Pony Canyon

Korean name
- Hangul: 김정유
- RR: Gim Jeongyu
- MR: Kim Chŏngyu

Kim Jung-yoo (Korean: 김정유, born February 8, 1979), better known as MC Sniper (Korean: MC 스나이퍼), is a South Korean rapper. He is known for writing controversial lyrics that challenge social injustice and mainstream society. He was a contestant on Show Me the Money and a producer on both seasons of Tribe of Hip Hop. He released his first album, So Sniper..., on May 17, 2002.

== Discography ==
=== Studio albums ===
Title	Album details	Peak chart positions	Sales
Title	Album details	KOR	Sales
So Sniper...	Released: May 16, 2002; Label: Pony Canyon; Formats: CD, cassette	10	KOR: 77,178
Intro (초행)	Released: May 15, 2003; Label: Pony Canyon; Formats: CD, cassette	13	KOR: 32,010
Be in Deep Grief	Released: March 18, 2004; Label: Sniper Sound, Pony Canyon; Formats: CD, cassette	15	KOR: 44,001
How Bad Do U Want It?	Released: March 5, 2007; Label: Sniper Sound, Pony Canyon; Formats: CD	4	KOR: 23,287
Museum	Released: November 17, 2009; Label: Sniper Sound, Pony Canyon; Formats: CD	No data	No data
Full Time	Released: April 13, 2012; Label: Sniper Sound; Formats: CD, digital download	16	KOR: 3,618
Album −1 (Subtitle: 40) (마이너스1집 (부제: 40))	Released: April 5, 2019; Label: Sniper Sound; Formats: CD, digital download	68	—N/a

=== Special albums ===
Title	Album details
MC Sniper Limited Edition	Released: December 27, 2002; Label Pony Canyon Korea; Formats: CD, digital download

=== Extended plays ===
Title	Album details	Peak chart positions	Sales
Title	Album details	KOR	Sales
B-Kite 1	Released: September 5, 2014; Label: B-Kite; Formats: CD, digital download	32	KOR: 698
B-Kite 2	Released: November 5, 2015; Label: B-Kite; Formats: CD, digital download	37	KOR: 552
Rebuild (힙합의 민족)	Released: May 30, 2016; Label: Sniper Sound; Formats: CD, digital download	—	—N/a
"—" denotes releases that did not chart or were not released in that region.

=== Charted singles ===
Title	Year	Peak chart positions	Sales (DL)	Album
Title	Year	KOR	Sales (DL)	Album
As lead artist
"Magic Castle" (마법의 성)	2009	24	—N/a	Museum
"Hakuna Matata" (하쿠나마타타)	2010	49	—N/a	Non-album singles
"Break Away" feat. Room9	2011	31	—N/a	Non-album singles
"Push It" feat. Illinit	2011	49	KOR: 111,611	Full Time
"I Can Do It" (할 수 있어) feat. Iruma	2012	26	KOR: 308,278	Full Time
"I Loved You" (사랑했잖아) Live ver. feat. Loco, Son Seung-yeon	2012	60	KOR: 44,711	Show Me the Money
"Sunset Glow" (붉은 노을) feat. Kim Ji-soo, Egobomb	2012	65	KOR: 52,542	Show Me the Money
"Danger"	2012	61	KOR: 131,220	Vampire Prosecutor OST
"Geto Christmas" feat. Mini	2012	—	KOR: 32,906	Non-album singles
"Why" (왜) feat. ZoneQ	2013	71	KOR: 24,318	Non-album singles
"Shakespeare In Love" (사랑비극 Part.1) feat. Kim Sin-ui	2015	41	KOR: 55,279	Non-album singles
"U.F.L (Unfinished Love)" feat. Bido Seungwoo	2015	81	KOR: 24,506	Non-album singles
Collaborations
"Mirror" (만우절) with Illinit	2010	56	—N/a	Non-album singles
"Like The First Day" (처음 그 날처럼) with Na Yoon-kwon, The Cheers	2012	50	KOR: 163,929	Non-album singles
"—" denotes releases that did not chart.

== Awards and nominations ==
=== Mnet Asian Music Awards ===
Year	Nominee / work	Award	Result
2002	"BK Love"	Best Hip Hop Performance	Nominated
