= Häädetkeidas Strict Nature Reserve =

Nature reserve in Finland

- IUCN category Ia (strict nature reserve)
- Location within Finland
- Location: Finland
- Coordinates: 62°2′59″N 22°45′6″E
- Area: 5.6 km^{2} (2.2 sq mi)
- Established: 1956
- Governing body: Metsähallitus

Häädetkeidas Strict Nature Reserve (Häädetkeitaan luonnonpuisto) is located in the Pirkanmaa and Satakunta regions of Finland. This thick, ancient forest and swamp reserve is inaccessible to the public. Bears and beavers make up some of the animal populations here and nearby regions.
