= Tymee =

South Korean rapper (born 1985)

Tymee; (타이미)
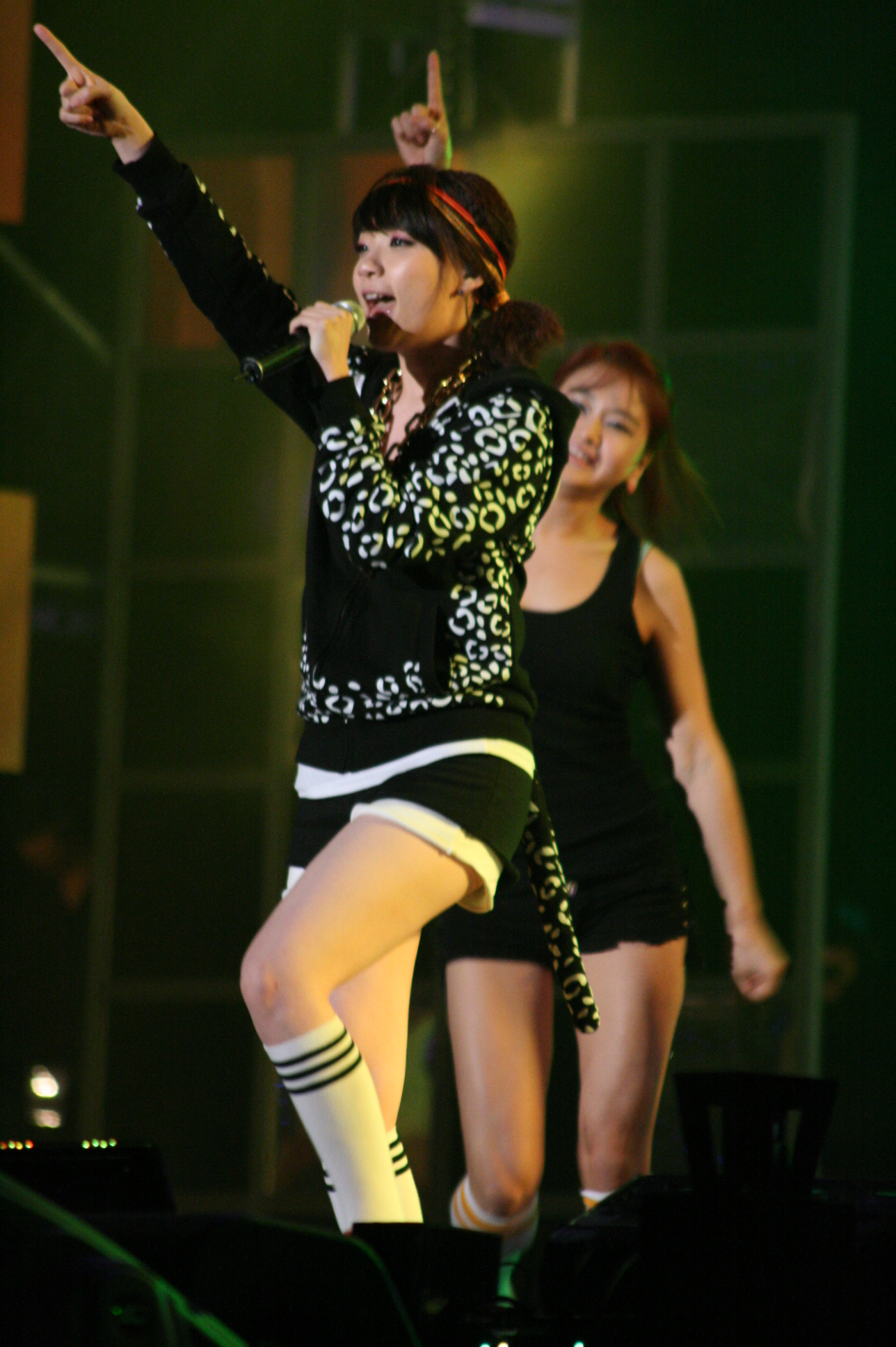
- Tymee performing at 2010 Asia Song Festival

Background information
- Also known as: E.via_{(2009–2013)}; Napper
- Born: Lee Ok-joo; December 6, 1985 (age 40)
- Origin: Seoul, South Korea
- Genre: Hip hop
- Occupations: Rapper; songwriter; pianist
- Years active: 2009–present
- Labels: Dline Art_{(2009–2013)}; ASSA_{(2013–present)}

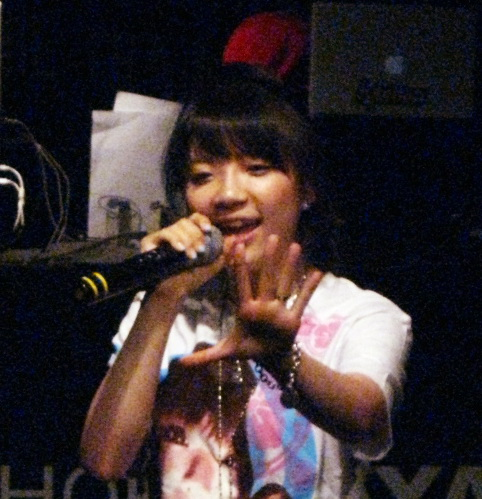
Tymee at a performance on July 11, 2009

Lee Ok-joo (Korean: 이옥주; born December 6, 1985), better known by her stage name Tymee (formerly known as E.via and Napper), is a South Korean rapper, songwriter, and pianist. She is currently represented by Outsider's label ASSA Communication and is known for being Korea's fastest female rapper.

== Career ==
=== 2009–2013: Debut, controversy, Must Have Mini Album ===
Her first EP E.via a.k.a. Happy Evil was released on the 18th May 2009. This included a collaboration with singer Sori (소리) which earned her significant media attention and popularity. Controversy erupted when "Oppa! na Haedodwae?" ("Oppa! Can I do it?"), the lead single from Tymee's debut album, was banned from being performed on Music Bank due to the lyrics of the song containing lascivious content and various slang words. E.Via was later banned from performing any of her songs from her debut album on other music programs due to the lyrics being deemed suggestive and provocative. Despite the ban, Tymee's album and "Oppa! na Haedodwae?" received overwhelming responses on online music sites.

The next song she performed was "Shake" from her Must Have Mini Album. The music video was released on April 29, 2010.

=== 2013–present: Label controversy, name change ===
On January 5, 2013, Tymee announced she had left Dline Art Media (her record company) and changed her stage name from E.via to Tymee. In a statement posted online, she said that she was in a similar situation as boy group Block B (who were suing their former label, Stardom Entertainment, at the time for inadequate compensation). She continued, "Due to financial as well as other realistic difficulties, I've decided to take back the music that's been changed due to my company's opinions and promote on my own. [Because of the unspeakable difficulties and unbearable exhaustion I've gone through], I came to this conclusion to save myself from falling apart." Tymee's agency claimed they only owed her 2.7 million won, to which she replied, "Though it was difficult to accept that the work I've done for the past 2 years only amounted to that much, I restrained myself thinking of the music I'll be able to do freely in the future."

== Discography ==
- E.via a.k.a. Happy Evil (2009)
- Motiphie Meets E.via! (2009)
- Must Have Mini Album (2010)
- Viapolar (2010)
- E.Viagradation Part.1 (Black & Red) (2012)

== Filmography ==
=== Television ===
Year	Title	Role	Notes
2015	Unpretty Rapstar	Contestant	7th; eliminated in the sixth episode.
