= Evia Oyj =

Finnish marketing communication agency

- Type: Public – Oyj (Nasdaq Helsinki: EVI1V)
- Industry: Media
- Founded: 1955 in Finland as Markkinointi Viherjuuri, since 2001 Evia Oyj
- Founders: Matti Viherjuuri and Kaija Viherjuuri
- Defunct: 2009 (bankruptcy)
- Headquarters: Helsinki, Finland
- Key people: Jari Torvelainen, CEO
- Services: Marketing communication
- Revenue: ▼€10.7 million (2006)
- Number of employees: 40
- Divisions: Axel Digital Group, Viherjuuri Helsinki Oy, Indigo

Evia Oyj was one of the largest Finnish marketing communication agencies. The company was founded in 1955, and it was known as Markkinointi Viherjuuri before the 2001 name change to Evia Oyj.

On 18 June 2009, Evia filed for bankruptcy.

== History ==
Evia was founded in 1955 and was named Markkinointi Viherjuuri by its founder Matti Viherjuuri. From 1955 to 1989, Markkinointi Viherjuuri was private company (Oy), and after 1989 public company (Oyj) and was listed in OMX (formerly Helsingin Pörssi) OTC-list.

In 2001, Markkinointi Viherjuuri announced new name for company, Evia Oyj to reflect the parent companies role better. Evia was formed from two separate parts: E meaning of digital communications and Latin word via meaning of road.

On 18 November 2002, Evia concluded personnel negotiations where three people was dismissed, two people was laid off for the time being and four persons as of 1 April 2003. After this Evia had another personnel negotiations on 26 August 2003, when concluded that 36 employees will set to fixed-term layoff for three months.

On 31 August 2004, Evia gave profit warning, and positive profit warning on 20 January 2006.

On 28 June 2005, CEO Mika Sario resigned and a new CEO, Jari Torvelainen, started on 1 August 2005.

== Services ==
Evia offered advertisement, marketing and communication services: direct marketing and digital communication services, brand management and design management. Evia had average of 90 employees at its best days.

== International cooperatives ==
Evia was cooperative of global Edelman, which had 46 own agencies and over 50 cooperative agencies all over the world. With cooperative contacts Evia did global projects like medical company communications and Shell oil company brand communication.

== Awards ==
- Outdoor campaign made for Sony BRAVIA was selected January 2006 in London as JCDecaux Group December 2005 best Innovate-Campaign in whole world.
- Toyota, which is Evia's marketing customer, won total of six awards in Loyalty Awards 2006.
- Evia Stenfors-campaign won Best Viral Campaign title in Finnish media Grand One 2007 gala.

== Bankruptcy ==
On 18 June 2009, the company sought bankruptcy due to heavy debts and recession in the marketing business. Marketing agency Viherjuuri Helsinki Oy, which was part of Evia, was split into an independent business and continued to operate. Viherjuuri applied for a court approval to undergo a reorganization. On 30 November 2009, it too filed for bankruptcy.
