= IUCN protected area categories =

International classification for protected areas

IUCN protected area categories, or IUCN protected area management categories, are categories used to classify protected areas in a system developed by the International Union for Conservation of Nature (IUCN).

The enlisting of such areas is part of a strategy being used toward the conservation of the world's natural environment and biodiversity. The IUCN has developed the protected area management categories system to define, record and classify the wide variety of specific aims and concerns when categorising protected areas and their objectives. Further supplementary guidelines have been developed specific to marine protected areas (MPAs).

This categorisation method is recognised on a global scale by national governments and international bodies such as the United Nations and the Convention on Biological Diversity.

== Categories ==
=== Category I ===
==== Category IA – strict nature reserve ====
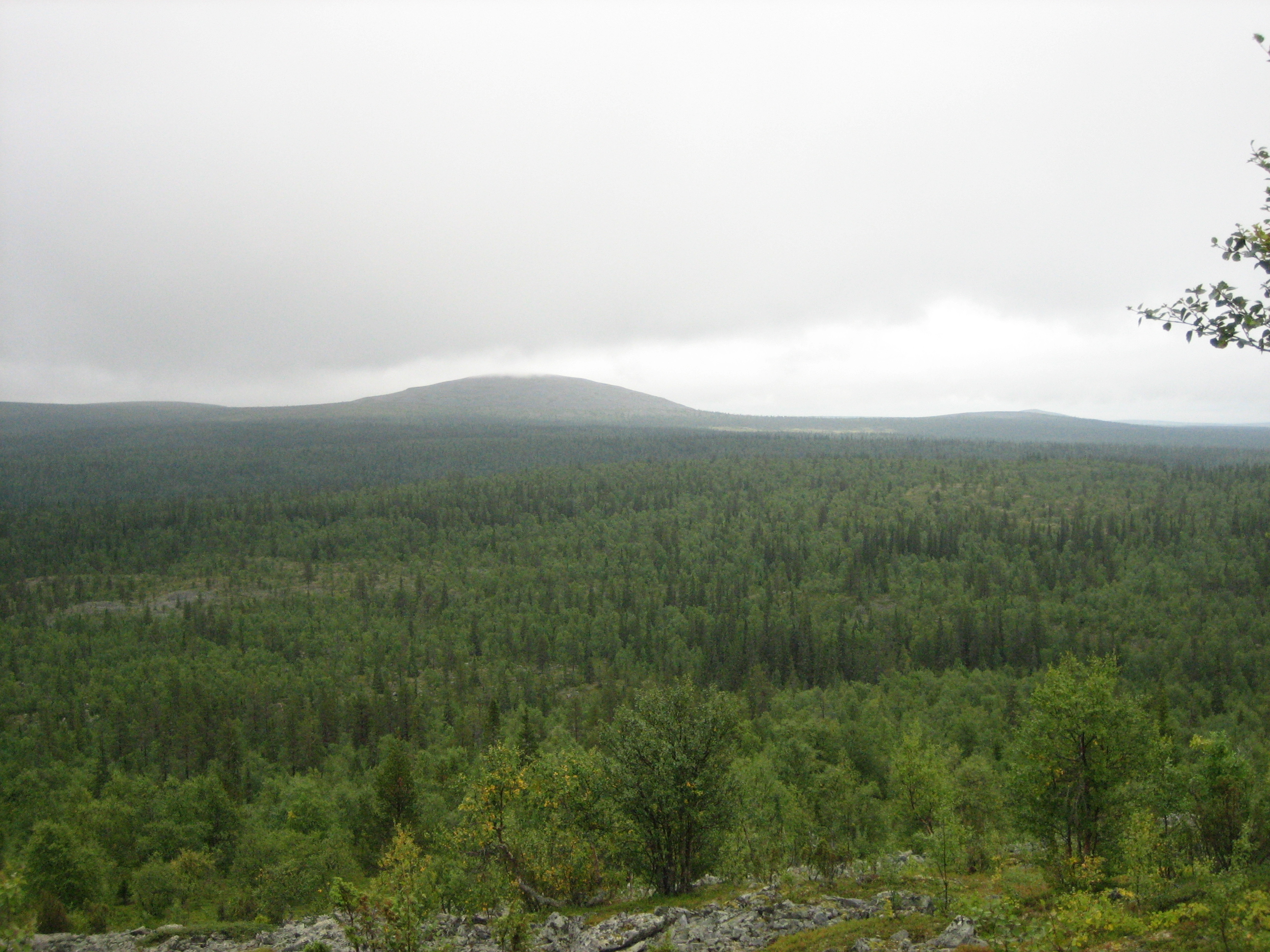
Värriö Strict Nature Reserve in Finland.

A strict nature reserve (IUCN Category Ia) is an area which is protected from all but light human use in order to protect its biodiversity and also possibly its geological/geomorphological features. These areas are often home to dense native ecosystems where all human disturbance except scientific study, environmental monitoring and education is prohibited. Because these areas are so strictly protected, they provide ideal pristine environments that enable measurement of external human influence by means of comparison with other areas.

In some cases, strict nature reserves are of spiritual significance for surrounding communities and are also protected for this reason. The people engaged in the practice of their faith within the region have the right to continue to do so, providing it aligns with the area's conservation and management objectives.

Human impacts on strict nature reserves are increasingly difficult to prevent because climate and air pollution and newly emerging diseases do not stop at the boundaries of protected areas. If perpetual intervention is required to maintain these strict guidelines, the area will often fall into category IV or V.

==== Category Ib – wilderness area ====
A wilderness area (IUCN Category Ib) is similar to a strict nature reserve, but generally larger and protected in a slightly less stringent manner.

These areas are a protected domain in which biodiversity and ecosystem processes (including evolution) are allowed to flourish or experience restoration if previously disturbed by human activity. These are areas which may buffer against the effects of climate change and protect threatened species and ecological communities.

Human visitation is limited to a minimum, often allowing only those who are willing to travel of their own devices (by foot, by ski, or by boat), but this offers a unique opportunity to experience wilderness that has not been interfered with. Wilderness areas can be classified as such only if they are devoid of modern infrastructure, though they allow human activity to the level of sustaining indigenous groups and their cultural and spiritual values within their wilderness-based lifestyles.

=== Category II – national park ===
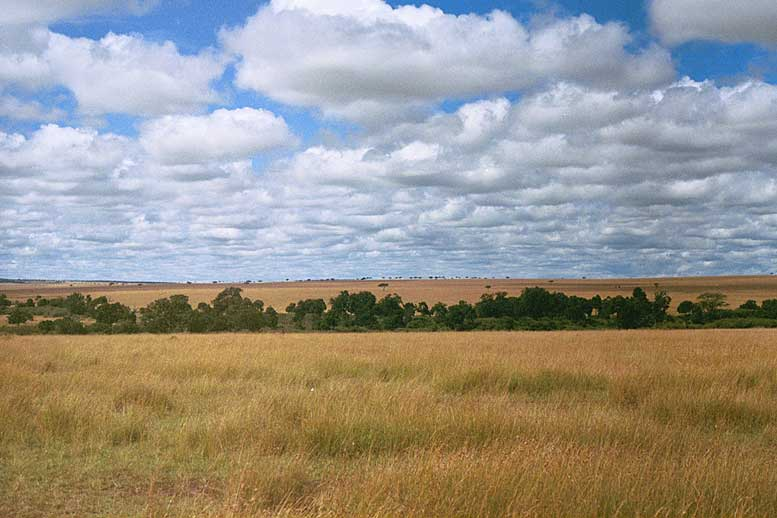
The Serengeti National Park, Tanzania is a designated Category II area

A IUCN Category II area is similar to a wilderness area in its size and its main objective of protecting functioning ecosystems. However, category II areas tend to be more lenient with human visitation and its supporting infrastructure. Category II areas are managed in a way that may contribute to local economies through promoting educational and recreational tourism on a scale that will not reduce the effectiveness of conservation efforts.

Despite "national park" being the common name of category II, not all protected areas titled "national park" fit the criteria for category II, and not all category II areas are called national parks.

The surrounding areas of a category II site may be for consumptive or non-consumptive use but should nevertheless act as a barrier for the defence of the protected area's native species and communities to enable them to sustain themselves in the long term.

=== Category III – natural monument or feature ===
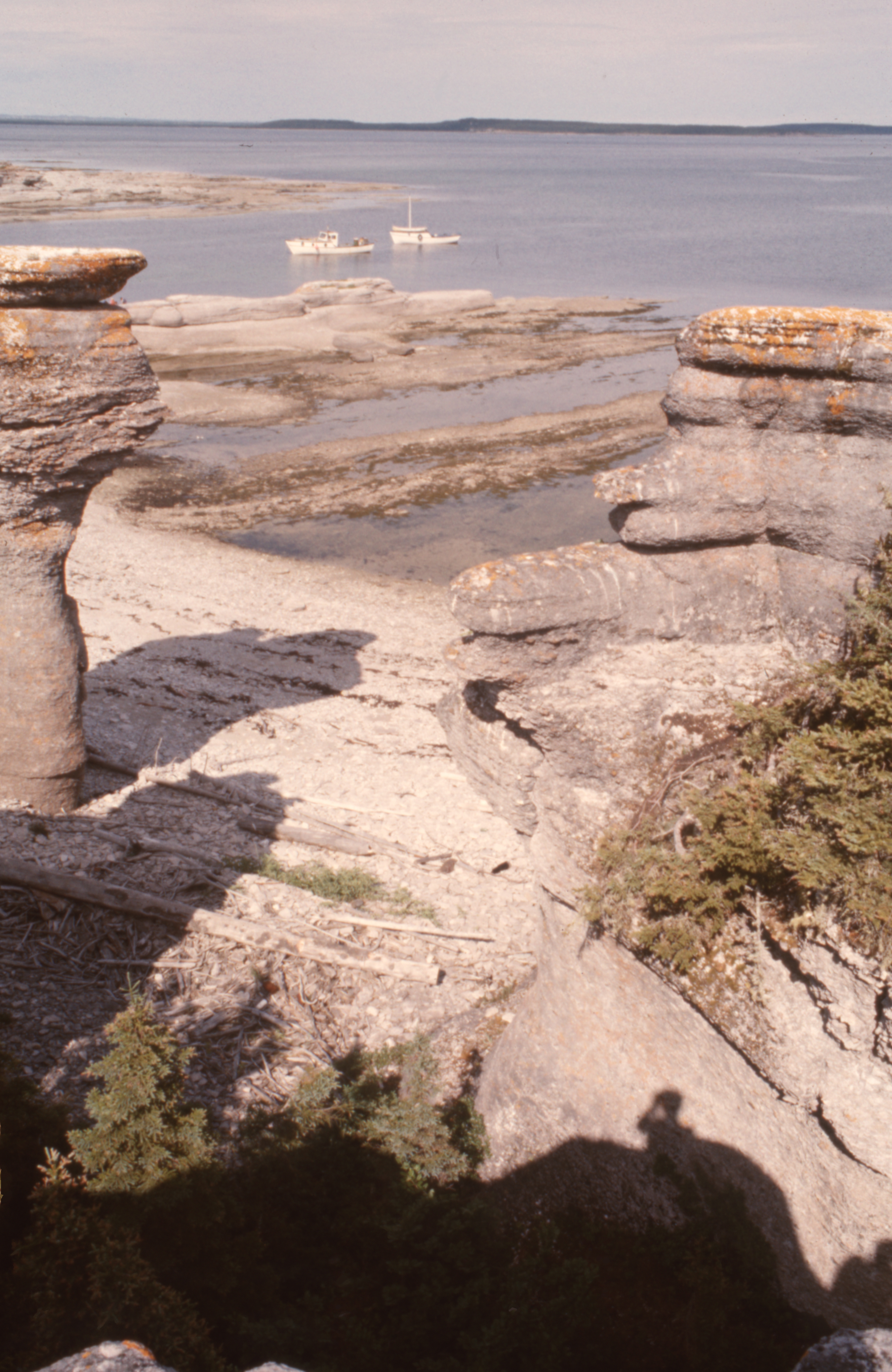
Mingan Archipelago National Park Reserve, gulf of St. Lawrence, Quebec, Canada

A natural monument or feature (IUCN Category III) is a comparatively smaller area that is specifically allocated to protect a natural monument and its surrounding habitats. These monuments can be natural in the fullest sense or include elements that have been influenced or introduced by humans. The latter should hold biodiversity associations or could otherwise be classified as a historical or spiritual site, though this distinction can be quite difficult to ascertain.

To be categorised as a natural monument or feature by IUCN's guidelines, the protected area could include natural geological or geomorphological features, culturally-influenced natural features, natural cultural sites, or cultural sites with associated ecology. The classification then falls into two subcategories: those in which the biodiversity is uniquely related to the conditions of the natural feature and those in which the current levels of biodiversity are dependent on the presence of the sacred sites that have created an essentially modified ecosystem.

Natural monuments or features often play a smaller but key ecological role in the operations of broader conservation objectives. They have a high cultural or spiritual value that can be utilised to gain support of conservation challenges by allowing higher visitation or recreational rights, therefore offering an incentive for the preservation of the site.

=== Category IV – habitat or species management area ===
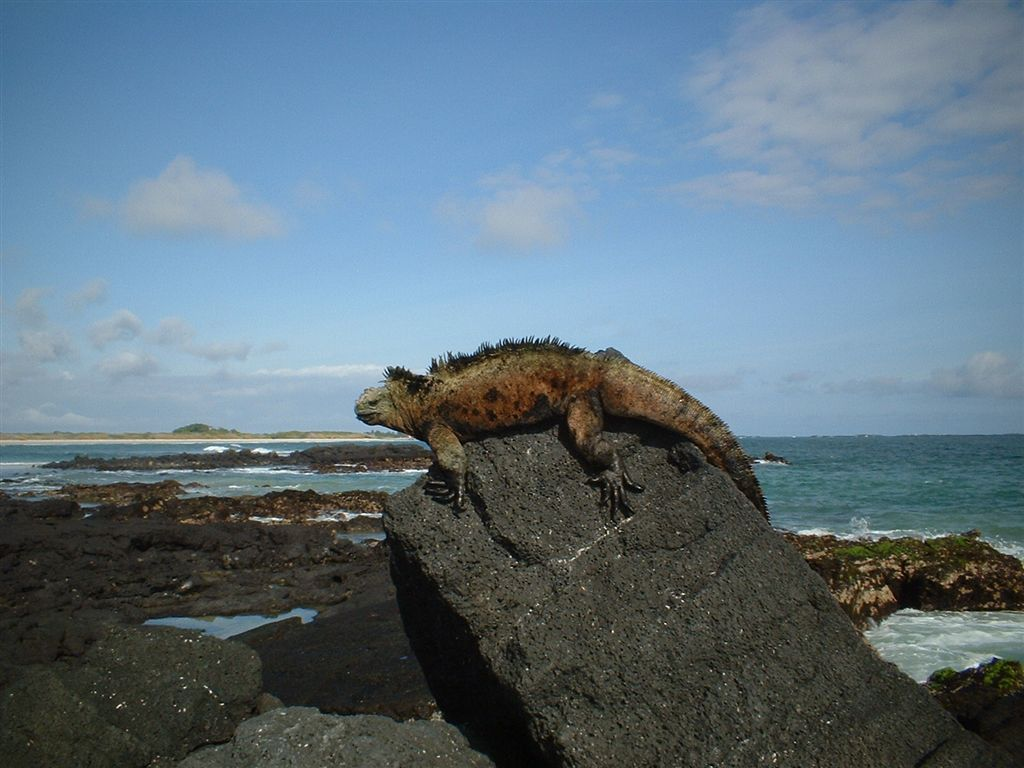
The Galápagos, Ecuador, is managed under category IV to preserve the islands' native flora and fauna

A habitat or species management area (IUCN Category IV) is similar to a natural monument or feature, but focuses on more specific areas of conservation (though size is not necessarily a distinguishing feature), like an identifiable species or habitat that requires continuous protection rather than that of a natural feature. These protected areas will be sufficiently controlled to ensure the maintenance, conservation, and restoration of particular species and habitats—possibly through traditional means—and public education of such areas is widely encouraged as part of the management objectives.

Habitat or species management areas may exist as a fraction of a wider ecosystem or protected area and may require varying levels of active protection. Management measures may include (but are not limited to) the prevention of poaching, creation of artificial habitats, halting natural succession, and supplementary feeding practices.

=== Category V – protected landscape or seascape ===
A protected landscape or protected seascape (IUCN Category V) covers a body of land or ocean with an explicit natural conservation plan, but usually also accommodates a range of for-profit activities.

The main objective is to safeguard regions that have built up a distinct and valuable ecological, biological, cultural, or scenic character. In contrast with previous categories, Category V permits surrounding communities to interact more with the area, contributing to the area's sustainable management and engaging with its natural and cultural heritage.

Landscapes and seascapes that fall into this category should represent an integral balance between people and nature and can sustain activities such as traditional agricultural and forestry systems on conditions that ensure the continued protection or ecological restoration of the area.

Category V is one of the more flexible classifications of protected areas. As a result, protected landscapes and seascapes may be able to accommodate contemporary developments, such as ecotourism, at the same time as maintaining the historical management practices that may procure the sustainability of agrobiodiversity and aquatic biodiversity.

=== Category VI – protected area with sustainable use of natural resources ===
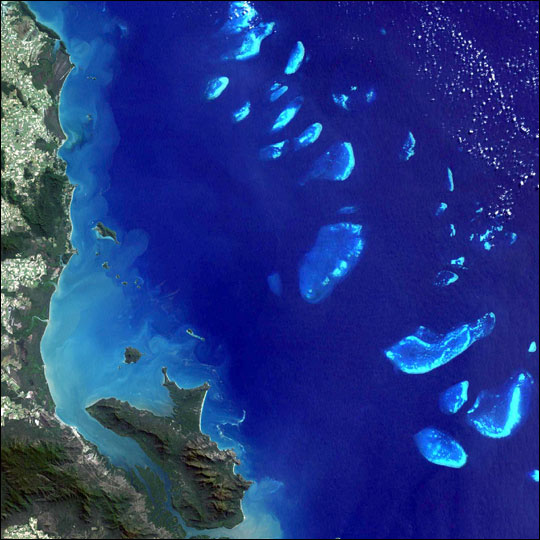
Satellite image of the Great Barrier Reef Marine Park, Australia

Though human involvement is a large factor in the management of these protected areas, developments are not intended to allow for wide scale industrial production. The IUCN recommends that a proportion of the land mass remain in its natural condition—a decision to be made on a national level, usually with specificity to each protected area. Governance has to be developed to adapt the diverse—and possibly growing—range of interests that arise from the production of sustainable natural resources.

Category VI may be particularly suitable to vast areas that already have a low level of human occupation or in which local communities and their traditional practices have had little permanent impact on the environmental health of the region. This differs from category V in that it is not the result of long-term human interaction that has had a transformative effect on surrounding ecosystems.

== See also ==
- UNEP-WCMC — United Nations Environment Programme - World Conservation Monitoring Centre.
- World Commission on Protected Areas
- World Database on Protected Areas
