= List of High School Rapper (season 3) contestants =

Contestants and results from South Korean hip hop survival show

High School Rapper 3 is a South Korean Hip hop survival television show.

== Contestants ==
Color key

- Contestant in Final
- Elimination in Semi Final
- Elimination in Collaboration
- Elimination in Team Battle
- Save from Finalization round (choose by another Mentors)
- Elimination in Finalization

| Mentors | Name | From | Grade | School | Rounds | | | | | | | | | |
| Mentors | Name | From | Grade | School | Finalization | Team Battle | Collaboration | | | Semi-final | Final | | | # |
| Mentors | Name | From | Grade | School | Finalization | Team Battle | Judges | Audience | Total | Semi-final | 1st | 2nd | Total | # |
|---|---|---|---|---|---|---|---|---|---|---|---|---|---|---|
| Giriboy and Kid Milli | Kwon Young-hoon (TANGTHEAWESOME) | Hanam, Gyeonggi | 3 grade | Sinjang High School | 252 | 197 | 175 | 282 | 457 | 364 ^{2} | 379 | 36 | 415 | 5 |
| Giriboy and Kid Milli | Yoo Chan-wook (BE'O) | Seoul | 3 grade | Seoul of Performing Arts High School | 158 | (eliminated) | | | | | | | | |
| Giriboy and Kid Milli | Choi Jin-ho (BlueWhale) | Seoul | 3 grade | GED | 229 | 197 | 178 | 253 | 431 | 376 | 398 | 29 | 427 | 3 |
| Giriboy and Kid Milli | Kim Ho-jin^{3} (Hotchkiss) | Gunpo, Gyeonggi | 2 grade | Gunpo High School | 142 | 125 | (eliminated) | | | | | | | 15 |
| Giriboy and Kid Milli | Go Joon-seo (xoi) | Jeju | 2 grade | Namnyeong High School | N/A | (eliminated) | | | | | | | | |
| Giriboy and Kid Milli | Jin Soo-min (iminnowhere) | Seoul | 2 grade | Geumok Woman High School | 180 | (eliminated) | | | | | | | | |
| Giriboy and Kid Milli | Kang Hyun-joon^{4} (Lil Tachi) | Incheon | 1 grade | GED | 238 | 125 | 178 | 253 | 431 | 359 | (eliminated) | | | 8 |
| Giriboy and Kid Milli | Jung Ji-woong (JAYONE) | Paju, Gyeonggi | Pre 1 grade | Dongpae High School | 193 | (eliminated) | | | | | | | | |
| Hangzoo and Boi B | Kang Min-soo^{1} ^{5} (AQUINAS) | Bucheon, Gyeonggi | 3 grade | Jungwon High School | 204 | 163 | 187 | 287 | 474 | 442 | 421 | 122 | 543 | 2 |
| Hangzoo and Boi B | Kim Dae-won | Incheon | 3 grade | Samsan High School | 180 | (eliminated) | | | | | | | | |
| Hangzoo and Boi B | Lee Jin-woo ($IGA A) | Anseong, Gyeonggi | 3 grade | Anseong High School | 241 | 163 | 181 | 254 | 435 | 449 | 395 | 22 | 417 | 4 |
| Hangzoo and Boi B | Seo Min-kyu (ITOWNKID) | Goyang, Gyeonggi | 3 grade | Sungsa High School | 189 | 103 | 187 | 287 | 474 | 362 | (eliminated) | | | 7 |
| Hangzoo and Boi B | Yoon Seung-ho (YBOY) | Bucheon, Gyeonggi | 3 grade | Zion High School | N/A | (eliminated) | | | | | | | | |
| Hangzoo and Boi B | Yoon Jong-ho (Born villain) | Seoul | 3 grade | GED | N/A | (eliminated) | | | | | | | | |
| Hangzoo and Boi B | Choi Jin-sung^{3} (Goi) | Gangneung, Gangwon | 3 grade | Moonseong High School | 130 | 103 | (eliminated) | | | | | | | 16 |
| Hangzoo and Boi B | Kim Hyo-dong^{6} (Wavy) | Busan | 2 grade | Kyungil High School | 169 | (eliminated) | | | | | | | | |
| Hangzoo and Boi B | Jo Jin-yong (Ken) | Goyang, Gyeonggi | 2 grade | Hwajeong High School | 144 | (eliminated) | | | | | | | | |
| The Quiett and Code Kunst | Jo Nam-hyuk (noicaten) | Seoul | 3 grade | Ogeum High School | 182 | (eliminated) | | | | | | | | |
| The Quiett and Code Kunst | Kim Byeong-kyu (X.I) | Daegu | 2 grade | Gyeongbuk Technical High School | 123 | (eliminated) | | | | | | | | |
| The Quiett and Code Kunst | Kim Min-kyu^{1} (Young Kay) | Icheon, Gyeonggi | 2 grade | GED | 213 | 175 | 189 | 276 | 465 | 356 | (eliminated) | | | 9 |
| The Quiett and Code Kunst | Yoon Hyun-sun (Gi$T) | Incheon | 2 grade | Incheon High School | 231 | 175 | 150 | 241 | 381 | (eliminated) | | | | 10 |
| The Quiett and Code Kunst | Lee Young-ji^{1} ^{7} | Seoul | 1 grade | Sinseo High School | 205 | 166 | 189 | 276 | 465 | 438 | 456 | 211 | 667 | 1 |
| The Quiett and Code Kunst | Song Min-jae^{4} (PLUMA) | Naju, South Jeolla | 1 grade | GED | 221 | 166 | 150 | 241 | 381 | (eliminated) | | | | 10 |
| The Quiett and Code Kunst | Choi Min-hong (CLIQUE) | Gangneung, Gangwon | Pre 1 grade | Moonseong High School | 157 | (eliminated) | | | | | | | | |
| GroovyRoom | Kim Hyun-sung^{3} (nerdboi) | Seoul | 3 grade | Hongik University High School | 210 | 134 | (eliminated) | | | | | | | 14 |
| GroovyRoom | Gil Jung-wook (KIRU) | Seoul | 3 grade | Hanlim Multi Arts High School | N/A | (eliminated) | | | | | | | | |
| GroovyRoom | Yang Seung-ho^{1} ^{4} (sokodomo) | Seoul | 3 grade | Seonrin Internet High School | 260 | 137 | 172 | 242 | 414 | 401 | 313 | 32 | 345 | 6 |
| GroovyRoom | Oh Dong-hwan (Untell) | Siheung, Gyeonggi | 3 grade | Jeongwang High School | 220 | 137 | (eliminated) | | | | | | | 13 |
| GroovyRoom | Choi Shin-hyun (ODD) | Namyangju, Gyeonggi | 3 grade | Jingeon High School | 152 | (eliminated) | | | | | | | | |
| GroovyRoom | Ok Ga-hyang (desperado) | Seoul | 1 grade | GED | 182 | (eliminated) | | | | | | | | |
| GroovyRoom | Ha Seon-ho^{6} ^{7} ^{8} (Sandy) | Seoul | 1 grade | Seoul Foreign Language High School | 229 | 134 | 141 | 233 | 374 | (eliminated) | | | | 12 |
| GroovyRoom | Yoon Seok-joon | Seoul | Pre 1 grade | Dankook University Software High School | N/A | (eliminated) | | | | | | | | |

== Team Finalization - Your Personal Story (Episodes 2 - 3) ==
Kang Min-su Team
| Rank | Name | Score |
|---|---|---|
| 1 | Lee Jin-woo | 241 |
| 2 | Kang Min-su | 204 |
| 3 | Seo Min-gyu | 189 |
| Eliminated | Kim Dae-won | 180 |
| Eliminated | Kim Hyo-dong | 169 |
| Eliminated | Yoon Jong-ho | — |
| Eliminated | Yoon Seung-ho | — |
| Eliminated | Jo Jin-yong | 144 |

Yang Seung-ho Team
| Rank | Name | Score |
|---|---|---|
| 1 | Yang Seung-ho | 260 |
| 2 | Ha Seon-ho | 229 |
| 3 | Oh Dong-hwan | 220 |
| Eliminated | Kim Hyeon-seong | 210 |
| Eliminated | Ok Ga-hyang | 182 |
| Eliminated | Choi Shin-hyun | 152 |
| Eliminated | Gil Jeong-wook | — |
| Eliminated | Yoon Seok-jun | — |

Lee Young-ji Team
| Rank | Name | Score |
|---|---|---|
| 1 | Yoon Hyeon-seon | 231 |
| 2 | Song Min-jae | 221 |
| 3 | Lee Young-ji | 205 |
| Eliminated | Jo Nam-hyuk | 182 |
| Eliminated | Choi Min-hong | 157 |
| Eliminated | Kim Ho-jin | 142 |
| Eliminated | Choi Jin-sung | 130 |
| Eliminated | Kim Byeong-gyu | 123 |

Kim Min-gyu Team
| Rank | Name | Score |
|---|---|---|
| 1 | Kwon Young-hoon | 252 |
| 2 | Kang Hyeon-jun | 238 |
| 3 | Choi Jin-ho | 229 |
| Eliminated | Kim Min-gyu | 213 |
| Eliminated | Jung Ji-woong | 193 |
| Eliminated | Jin Soo-min | 180 |
| Eliminated | Yoo Chan-wook | 154 |
| Eliminated | Go Jun-seo | — |

Final the teams
| Mentor | Big 3 in the team (with the most votes) | Save Finalization |
|---|---|---|
| Giriboy & Kid Milli | Kwon Young-hoon, Kang Hyeon-jun, Choi Jin-ho | Kim Ho-jin |
| GroovyRoom | Yang Seung-ho, Ha Seon-ho, Oh Dong-hwan | Choi Jin-sung |
| The Quiett & Code Kunst | Lee Young-ji, Song Min-jae, Yoon Hyeon-seon | Kim Min-gyu |
| Hangzoo & Boi B | Lee Jin-woo, Kang Min-su, Seo Min-gyu | Kim Hyun-sung |

Note : Indicates student performance not shown.

== Team Battle - Textbook Literature (Episodes 4-5) ==
| Categories | | Mentors | Contestants | | Song | Point (max. votes 200) |
|---|---|---|---|---|---|---|
| Poem | VS | Hangzoo & Boi B | Lee Jin-woo | Kang Min-soo | "For High School Rapper" For A Whale - Jung Ho-seung | 163 Passed |
| Poem | VS | GroovyRoom | Yang Seung-ho | Oh Dong-hwan* | "Mirror" Mirror - Ee-sang | 137 Eliminated |
| Poem | VS | The Quiett & Code Kunst | Yoon Hyun-sun | Kim Min-gyu | "Starry Night" Starry Night - Yoon Dong-joo | 175 Passed |
| Poem | VS | Giriboy & Kid Milli | Kang Hyun-joon | Kim Ho-jin* | "Snow" Snow - Kim Soo-young | 125 Eliminated |
| Novel | VS | Giriboy & Kid Milli | Kwon Young-hoon | Choi Jin-ho | "Seagull's Dream" Seagull's Dream - Richard Bach | 197 Passed |
| Novel | VS | Hangzoo & Boi B | Seo Min-gyu | Choi Jin-sung* | "Pheasant" Pheasant - Lee Oh-deok | 103 Eliminated |
| Novel | VS | The Quiett & Code Kunst | Song Min-jae | Lee Young-ji | "Orange Tree" My Lime Orange Tree - JM de V | 166 Passed |
| Novel | VS | GroovyRoom | Ha Seon-ho | Kim Hyun-sung* | "Metamorphosis" Metamorphosis - Franz Kafka | 134 Eliminated |

Note : * Contestant was eliminated.

== Team Battle - Collaboration with Mentors (Episodes 5 - 6) ==
| # | Contestant(s) | Collaboration mentor | Song | Guest judge score (max. 200 pts) | Audience score (max. 300 pts) | Total (max. 500 pts) |
|---|---|---|---|---|---|---|
| 1 | Kang Min-su (AQuiNa$) Seo Min-gyu (ITOWNKID) | Hangzoo | "Cheat Sheet" | 187 | 287 | 474 |
| 2 | Kwon Young-hoon (TANGTHEAWESOME) | Giriboy | "Live As It Happens" | 175 | 282 | 457 |
| 3 | Ha Seon-ho (Sandy) | pH-1 | "I'm Fine" | 141 | 233 | 374 |
| 4 | Lee Jin-woo ($IGA A) | Boi B | "Cowboy" | 181 | 254 | 435 |
| 5 | Yoon Hyeon-seon (GI$T) Song Min-jae (Pluma) | The Quiett | "How Are You These Days" | 150 | 241 | 381 |
| 6 | Kang Hyeon-jun (Lil Tachi) Choi Jin-ho (BlueWhale) | Kid Milli | "Camouflage" | 178 | 253 | 431 |
| 7 | Yang Seung-ho (sokodomo) | Uneducated Kid | "U.F.O" | 172 | 242 | 414 |
| 8 | Kim Min-gyu (YK) Lee Young-ji | Kim Hyo-eun | "G.O (Get Out)" | 189 | 276 | 465 |

== Semi-Final (Episode 7) ==
| # | Contestant | Song | Score |
|---|---|---|---|
| 1 | Seo Min-gyu with Chillin Homie | "End (Go Finish Dem)" | 362 |
| 2 | Kang Min-soo | "Prophecy" | 442 |
| 3 | Lee Young-ji with Coogie & The Quiett | "Go With Me" | 438 |
| 4 | Kim Min-gyu with VINXEN | "HERE" | 356 |
| 5 | Choi Jin-ho | "Drama" | 376 |
| 6 | Kang Hyun-joon with NO:EL | "Dogsick" | 359 ^{2} |
| 7 | Lee Jin-woo with WEBSTER B & Hangzoo | "Face Mask" | 449 |
| 8 | Kwon Young-hoon with Han Yo-han | "Dandy" | 364 |
| 9 | Yang Seung-ho with HAON | "Freedumb" | 401 |

== Final (Episode 8) ==
| # | Contestant | Song | 1st Round | 2nd Second | Total |
|---|---|---|---|---|---|
| 1 | Kwon Young-hoon with Agee Expression & MoonMean | "8" | 379 | 36 | 415 |
| 2 | Choi Jin-ho with Giriboy & Punchnello | "My Way" | 398 | 29 | 427 |
| 3 | Yang Seung-ho with KIRIN | "Earth Destruction" | 313 | 32 | 345 |
| 4 | Lee Young-ji with Changmo & Woo Won-jae | "GO HIGH" | 456 | 211 | 667 |
| 5 | Kang Min-soo with Penomeco & Youra | "Popcorn" | 421 | 122 | 543 |
| 6 | Lee Jin-woo with Boi B & Owen Ovadoz | "Manor Salary" | 395 | 22 | 417 |

== Notes ==
- ^{1}Contestant was revived in wildcard challenge.
- ^{2}During the semi-final there was a scoring error, where the last 20 seconds of Kwon Young-hoon's performance weren't fully counted. Before the last score during 20 seconds is 345 points + 31.13 points (average of other participants last 20 seconds tally) became 376.13 points, but the original score is 364 points. Since he was overtaken for the last available seat in the finals, the mentors agreed that he should be allowed to advance with the other 5 contestants.
- ^{3}Once the teams chose their mentors, the mentors were allowed to save one eliminated contestant to join the team. Choi Jin-sung from Lee Young Ji's team to Hangzoo & Boi B team, Kim Ho-jin from Lee Young Ji's team to Giriboy & Kid Milli team, and Kim Min-gyu from his team to The Quiett & Code Kunst team.
- ^{4}Kang Hyun-joon, Song Min-jae and Yang Seung-ho was participants on rap competition Show Me the Money 777.
- ^{5}Kang Min-soo was a participant on rap competition Show Me the Money 5 and a previous participant on High School Rapper.
- ^{6}Kim Hyo-dong and Ha Seon-ho was a previous contestant on High School Rapper 2.
- ^{7}Lee Young-ji and Ha Seon-ho are former members hip hop crew Hiphop GirlZ.
- ^{8}Ha Seon-ho was a participant on rap competition Show Me the Money 6. Aftermath, she left the Mystic Entertainment and debut as rapper with stage name Sandy on 2019 under Upvote Entertainment.
