= High School Rapper season 3 =

High School Rapper
- Season 3
- Native name
- Hangul: 고등래퍼 3
- RR: Godeungnaepeo 3
- MR: Kodŭngnaep'ŏ 3
- No. of episodes: 8

Release
- Original network: Mnet
- Original release: February 22 – April 12, 2019

Season chronology
- ← Previous; Season 2 Next → Season 4

High School Rapper 3 (Korean: 고등래퍼3) is the third season of a popular South Korean survival hip-hop TV show, High School Rapper. The new season was announced on December 5, 2018. It aired on Mnet starting from February 22, 2019. The show featured young rappers born between 2000 and 2003.

== Season overview ==
=== Mentors groups ===
- Giriboy & Kid Milli
- Hangzoo & Boi B
- The Quiett & Code Kunst
- GroovyRoom.

== Contestants ==
The contestants were sorted by the grade they attend in school.

Reserve Class 1 (Freshman)	Grade 1 (Sophomore)	Grade 2 (Junior)	Grade 3 (Senior)	Grade 3 (Senior)
Jung Ji-woong "JAYONE"	Song Min-jae "Pluma"	Kim Ho-jin "Hotchkiss"	Oh Dong-hwan "Untell"	Choi Jin-sung "Goi"
Choi Min-hong "Clique"	Ha Seon-ho "Sandy"	Kim Min-gyu "YK"	Yang Seung-ho "Sokodomo"	Kang Min-su "AQuiNa$"
Yoon Seok-jun	Kang Hyeon-jun "Lil Tachi"	Yoon Hyeon-seon "GI$T"	Kwon Young-hoon "TANGTHEAWESOME"	Seo Min-gyu "ITOWNKID"
	Ok Ga-hyang "De'sperado"	Kim Hyo-dong "Wavy"	Lee Jin-woo "$IGA A"	Choi Jin-ho "BlueWhale"
	Lee Young-ji	Kim Byeong-gyu "X.I"	Kim Hyeon-seong "Nerdboi"	Yoo Chan-wook "Be'O"
		Jo Jin-yong "Ken"	Gil Jeong-wook "7<iru"	Yoon Seung-ho "YBOY"/"SOKODOMO"
		Jin Soo-min	Choi Shin-hyun "ODD"	Jo Nam-hyuk
		Go Jun-seo	Kim Dae-won	Yoon Jong-ho

== Episodes ==
=== Episode 1 ===
On the first episode of the show, 32 high school students handpicked by the show's producers among 8,000 applicants met each other the first time.

Students in the same grade had to compete each other with freestyle rap, and the other grades got to vote on the best rapper among that grade. Then, the students voted first place in their respective grades were given the opportunity to take turns and choose their own teammates.

Unlike last year, there were three preliminary high school students and many high school seniors, so they were divided into groups (high school 1+ preliminary high school 1), high school 2A, and high school 3B.

- Preliminary Class 1 and Grade 1 were combined to make a group of 8 contestants.

Pre Class 1 + Grade 1: Cyphers
Class	Contestant	Beat
Pre Class 1	Jung Ji-woong	Body Language - Kid Ink
Pre Class 1	Choi Min-hong	—
Pre Class 1	Min Seok-jun	—
Grade 1	Lee Young-ji	Battle - Gang Starr
Grade 1	Song Min-jae	Body Language - Kid Ink
Grade 1	Kang Hyeon-jun	Battle - Gang Starr
Grade 1	Ha Seon-ho	Bodak Yellow - Cardi B
Grade 1	Ok Ga-hyang	—

Grade 2: Cyphers
Contestant	Beat
Kim Min-gyu	99 Problems - Jay-Z
Kim Hyo-dong	WDYW - Carnage
Jo Jin-yong	WDYW - Carnage
Kim Ho-jin	Riot - XXXTENTACION
Yoon Hyeon-seon	Riot - XXXTENTACION
Jin Soo-min	—
Kim Byeong-gyu	—
Go Jun-seo	—

Grade 3: Cyphers Grade 3 was split into 2 groups of 8 contestants for these cyphers.
Contestant	Beat	Contestant	Beat
Yang Seung-ho	DNA - Kendrick Lamar	Kang Min-su	Esskeetit - Lil Pump
Oh Dong-hwan	DNA - Kendrick Lamar	Kwon Young-hoon	Guess Who's Back - Rakim
Yoo Chan-wook	DNA - Kendrick Lamar	Seo Min-gyu	Esskeetit - Lil Pump
Choi Jin-sung	SICKO MODE - Travis Scott	Lee Jin-woo	Esskeetit - Lil Pump
Kim Hyeon-seong	kick, push - Lupe Fiasco	Choi Jin-ho	London Bridge - Fergie
Gil Jeong-wook	—	Yoon Seung-ho	—
Jo Nam-hyuk	—	Yoon Jong-ho	—
Kim Dae-won	—	Choi Shin-hyun	—

Each winning contestant became the leader of a team, each picking 7 contestants to join them.

Indicates student performance not shown.

Teams
Kang Min-su	Yang Seung-ho	Kim Min-gyu	Lee Young-ji
Seo Min-gyu	Ha Seon-ho	Kwon Young-hoon	Song Min-jae
Lee Jin-woo	Oh Dong-hwan	Choi Jin-ho	Kim Ho-jin
Kim Hyo-dong	Kim Hyeon-seong	Kang Hyeon-jun	Choi Jin-sung
Jo Jin-yong	Yoon Seok-jun	Jung Ji-woong	Yoon Hyeon-seon
Kim Dae-won	Choi Shin-hyun	Go Jun-seo	Kim Byeong-gyu
Yoon Seung-ho	Ok Ga-hyang	Jin Soo-min	Jo Nam-hyuk
Yoon Jong-ho	Gil Jeong-wook	Yoo Chan-wook	Choi Min-hong

=== Episode 2 – 3 ===
Each team of contestants rapped and were scored by the mentors: Giriboy & Kid Milli, Hangzoo & Boi B, The Quiett & Code Kunst, and GroovyRoom.

Only 3 contestants could move on to the next round.

Indicates student performance not shown.

Kang Min-su Team
Rank	Name	Score
1	Lee Jin-woo	241
2	Kang Min-su	204
3	Seo Min-gyu	189
Eliminated	Kim Dae-won	180
Eliminated	Kim Hyo-dong	169
Eliminated	Yoon Jong-ho	—
Eliminated	Yoon Seung-ho	—
Eliminated	Jo Jin-yong	144

Yang Seung-ho Team
Rank	Name	Score
1	Yang Seung-ho	260
2	Ha Seon-ho	229
3	Oh Dong-hwan	220
Eliminated	Kim Hyeon-seong	210
Eliminated	Ok Ga-hyang	182
Eliminated	Choi Shin-hyun	152
Eliminated	Gil Jeong-wook	—
Eliminated	Yoon Seok-jun	—

● Yoon Seok-jun had a headache and was not able to perform.

Lee Young-ji Team
Rank	Name	Score
1	Yoon Hyeon-seon	231
2	Song Min-jae	221
3	Lee Young-ji	205
Eliminated	Jo Nam-hyuk	182
Eliminated	Choi Min-hong	157
Eliminated	Kim Ho-jin	142
Eliminated	Choi Jin-sung	130
Eliminated	Kim Byeong-gyu	123

Kim Min-gyu Team
Rank	Name	Score
1	Kwon Young-hoon	252
2	Kang Hyeon-jun	238
3	Choi Jin-ho	229
Eliminated	Kim Min-gyu	213
Eliminated	Jung Ji-woong	193
Eliminated	Jin Soo-min	180
Eliminated	Yoo Chan-wook	154
Eliminated	Go Jun-seo	—

The teams (now with 3 members) choose their mentor duo.

- Giriboy & Kid Milli Team: Kwon Young-hoon, Kang Hyeon-jun, Choi Jin-ho
- GroovyRoom Team: Yang Seung-ho, Ha Seon-ho, Oh Dong-hwan
- The Quiett & Code Kunst Team: Lee Young-ji, Song Min-jae, Yoon Hyeon-seon
- Hangzoo & Boi B Team: Lee Jin-woo, Kang Min-su, Seo Min-gyu

Once the teams chose their mentors, the mentors were allowed to save one eliminated contestant to join the team.

- Hangzoo & Boi B Team: Choi Jin-sung
- GroovyRoom Team: Kim Hyeon-seong
- Giriboy & Kid Milli Team: Kim Ho-jin
- The Quiett & Code Kunst Team: Kim Min-gyu

Top 16
Rank	Student	Score
1	Yang Seung-ho	260
2	Kwon Young-hoon	252
3	Lee Jin-woo	241
4	Kang Hyeon-jun	238
5	Yoon Hyeon-seon	231
6	Choi Jin-ho	229
6	Ha Seon-ho	229
8	Song Min-jae	221
9	Oh Dong-hwan	220
10	Kim Min-gyu	213
11	Kim Hyeon-seong	210
12	Lee Young-ji	205
13	Kang Min-su	204
14	Seo Min-gyu	189
15	Kim Ho-jin	142
16	Choi Jin-sung	130

=== Episode 4 – 5 ===
The teams split into pairs and create a rap based on a poem or novel. The pairs face off, eliminating half of the contestants based on scores from the audience.

1st Team Competition: Textbook Rap
Hangzoo & Boi B Team	Song Poem	Score Result	VS	GroovyRoom Team	Song Poem	Score Result
Lee Jin-woo ($IGA A) Kang Min-su (AQuiNa$)	"For High School Rapper" For A Whale - Jung Ho-seung	163 Passed		Yang Seung-ho (sokodomo) Oh Dong-hwan (Untell)	"Mirror" Mirror - Ee-sang	137 Eliminated
The Quiett & Code Kunst Team	Song Poem	Score Result	VS	Giriboy & Kid Milli Team	Song Poem	Score Result
Yoon Hyeon-seon (GI$T) Kim Min-gyu (YK)	"Starry Night" Starry Night - Yoon Dong-joo	175 Passed		Kang Hyeon-jun (Lil Tachi) Kim Ho-jin (Hotchkiss)	"Snow" Snow - Kim Soo-young	125 Eliminated

Giriboy & Kid Milli Team	Song Book	Score Result	VS	Hangzoo & Boi B Team	Song Book	Score Result
Kwon Young-hoon (TANG) Choi Jin-ho (BlueWhale)	"Seagull's Dream" Seagull's Dream - Richard Bach	197 Passed		Seo Min-gyu (ITOWNKID) Choi Jin-sung (Goi)	"Pheasant" Pheasant - Lee Oh-deok	103 Eliminated
The Quiett & Code Kunst Team	Song Book	Score Result	VS	GroovyRoom Team	Song Book	Score Result
Song Min-jae (Pluma) Lee Young-ji	"Orange Tree" My Lime Orange Tree - JM de V	166 Passed		Ha Seon-ho (Sandy) Kim Hyeon-seong (Nerdboi)	"Metamorphosis" Metamorphosis - Franz Kafka	134 Eliminated

The mentors are allowed to save one contestant from each of their eliminated pairs.

- Hangzoo & Boi B Team: Seo Min-gyu
- GroovyRoom Team: Yang Seung-ho & Ha Seon-ho
- Giriboy & Kid Milli Team: Kang Hyeon-jun

=== Episode 5 – 6 ===
The teams split up to rap with one of their mentors for a collaboration rap. The scoring for each stage is out of 200 points from a group of 8 guest judges: H2ADIN & WEBSTER B, Coogie & Zizo, Ja Mezz & KillaGramz, and Nada & Giant Pink.

2nd Team Competition: Mentor Collaboration
Rank	Contestant(s)	Collaboration Mentor	Song	Guest Judge Score	Audience Score	Total
1	Kang Min-su (AQuiNa$) Seo Min-gyu (ITOWNKID)	Hangzoo	"Cheat Sheet"	187	287	474
2	Kim Min-gyu (YK) Lee Young-ji	Kim Hyo-eun	"G.O (Get Out)"	189	276	465
3	Kwon Young-hoon (TANGTHEAWESOME)	Giriboy	"Live As It Happens"	175	282	457
4	Lee Jin-woo ($IGA A)	Boi B	"Cowboy"	181	254	435
5	Kang Hyeon-jun (Lil Tachi) Choi Jin-ho (BlueWhale)	Kid Milli	"Camouflage"	178	253	431
6	Yang Seung-ho (sokodomo)	Uneducated Kid	"U.F.O"	172	242	414
7	Yoon Hyeon-seon (GI$T) Song Min-jae (Pluma)	The Quiett	"How Are You These Days"	150	241	381
8	Ha Seon-ho (Sandy)	pH-1	"I'm Fine"	141	233	374

The total scores from the guest judge's 200 points and the audience's 300 points were totalled, and the 2 lowest scoring contestants/pairs were eliminated.

=== Episode 7 ===
This is the semi-final round, where each of the 9 remaining contestants has a solo stage (with or without a featuring artist). Only 5 seats remain open to proceed to the finals.

Semi-Final Performances
Rank	Contestant	Song	Score
1	Lee Jin-woo ($IGA A) with WEBSTER B & Hangzoo	"Face Mask"	449
2	Kang Min-su (AQuiNa$)	"Prophecy"	442
3	Lee Young-ji with Coogie & The Quiett	"Go With Me"	438
4	Yang Seung-ho (sokodomo) with HAON	"Freedumb"	401
5	Choi Jin-ho (BlueWhale)	"Drama"	376
6	Kwon Young-hoon (TANGTHEAWESOME) with Han Yo-han	"Dandy"	364
7	Seo Min-gyu (ITOWNKID) with Chillin Homie	"End (Go Finish Dem)"	362
8	Kang Hyeon-jun (Lil Tachi) with NO:EL	"Dogsick"	359
9	Kim Min-gyu (YK) with VINXEN	"HERE"	356

During the last 20 seconds of each performance, the audience voting was hidden, and the full score was revealed at the end of the semi-final.

==== *Scoring Error* ====
During the semi-final, there was a scoring error, where the last 20 seconds of Kwon Young-hoon's performance weren't fully counted. Since he was overtaken for the last available seat in the finals, the mentors agreed that he should be allowed to advance with the other 5 contestants. His original score of 362 became 376.

=== Episode 8 ===
This is the final round, where each of the 6 remaining contestants has a solo stage (with or without a featuring artist).

Final Performances & Rankings
Rank	Contestant	Song	1st Round	2nd Round	Total
1	Lee Young-ji with Changmo & Woo Won-jae	"GO HIGH"	456	211	667
2	Kang Min-su (AQuiNa$) with Penomeco & Youra	"Popcorn"	421	122	543
3	Choi Jin-ho (BlueWhale) with Giriboy & Punchnello	"My Way"	398	29	427
4	Lee Jin-woo ($IGA A) with Boi B & Owen Ovadoz	"Manor Salary"	395	22	417
5	Kwon Young-hoon (TANGTHEAWESOME) with Agee Expression & MoonMean	"8"	379	36	415
6	Yang Seung-ho (sokodomo) with KIRIN	"Earth Destruction"	313	32	345

The results were followed by a special stage performance from some of the contestants that had been eliminated.

- "Winner" - Kim Ho-jin (Hotchkiss), Oh Dong-hwan (Untell), Yoon Hyeon-seon (GI$T), and Choi Jin-sung (Goi)

Later, a winner single was released.

- "READY" - Lee Young-ji (feat. The Quiett)

== Ratings ==
Average TV viewership ratings
Ep.	Original broadcast date	Average audience share
Ep.	Original broadcast date	Nielsen Korea (Nationwide)
1	February 22, 2019	1.511% (7th)
2	March 1, 2019	1.501% (10th)
3	March 8, 2019	1.297% (8th)
4	March 15, 2019	0.947% (27th)
5	March 22, 2019	0.901% (22nd)
6	March 29, 2019	1.125% (16th)
7	April 5, 2019	1.074% (21st)
8	April 12, 2019	1.08% (20th)
In the table above, the blue numbers represent the lowest ratings and the red numbers represent the highest ratings.
