= Gree (entertainer) =

South Korean musician (born 1998)

- 김동현
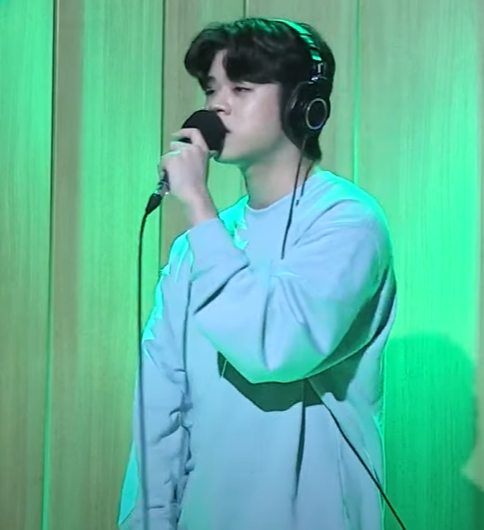
- Gree in 2021
- Born: Kim Dong-hyeon; November 10, 1998 (age 27); Incheon, South Korea
- Occupations: Rapper; singer; actor; television personality
- Father: Kim Gu-ra
- Musical career
- Genres: Hip-hop
- Instrument: Vocals
- Years active: 2006–present
- Label: Brand New Music

Korean name
- Hangul: 김동현
- Hanja: 金東炫
- RR: Gim Donghyeon
- MR: Kim Tonghyŏn

Kim Dong-hyeon (Korean: 김동현; born November 10, 1998), better known by his stage name Gree (그리), is a South Korean rapper, singer, actor and television personality signed to Brand New Music.

== Discography ==
=== Singles ===
Title	Year	Peak chart positions	Sales	Album
Title	Year	KOR	Sales	Album
As lead artist
"Nineteen" (열아홉)	2016	11	KOR: 119,401+	Nineteen
"Dangerous" (이불 밖은 위험해)	2016	84	KOR: 35,365	GREEality Pt. 1
As featured artist
"On Top Of Your Head" (모두가 내 발아래) (San E feat. MC Gree)	2015	—	KOR: 1,816 (physical) (Note: Sales was based on the number of physical albums sold.)	The Boy Who Cried Wolf
Collaborations
"Already Christmas" (어느새 크리스마스) {with Yang Da-il, Chancellor, As One, and Min hee)	2016	—	KOR: 13,992	Brand New Year 2016 - Better Tomorrow
"I'm Good" (with Jessi)	2017	—	KOR: 26,582	Highschool Rapper Regional Competition, Pt. 2
"Playlist" (with Kim Dong-hyun & Lee Dae-hwi of AB6IX, Hong Seong-jun & Yun Jung-hwan of BDC, Lee Eun-sang, and Kanto)	2021	—	—N/a	Non-album single
"—" denotes releases that did not chart or were not released in that region.

== Filmography ==
=== Film ===
Year	Title	Role	Notes	Ref.
2009	White Tuft, the Little Beaver	Little Beaver	voice	

=== Television series ===
Year	Title	Role	Notes	Ref.
2008	Cooking Up Romance	Jang Soo-gon		
2010	Golden House		cameo	
2010	Honey Jar		cameo	
2010	King of Kimchi		cameo	
2011	Birdie Buddy		cameo	
2012	May Queen	young Chun Sang-tae		
2013	Glass Bandage	Lee Joon-ho	One act-drama	
2013	Golden Rainbow	young Chun Soo-pyo		
2017	Hit the Top		cameo (Ep. 7)	

=== Television shows ===
Year	Title	Role	Ref.
2017	High School Rapper	Contestant	
2021	Money Tech: I Can Rich	MC	
2022	Godfather	Studio MC	
2022	Is the parting will be a recall?	Judge	

=== Web shows ===
Year	Title	Role	Ref.
2022	Between Marriage and Divorce	Host	

== Theater ==
Year	English title	Korean title	Role	Ref.
2023	Dream High	드림하이	Jason	

== Awards and nominations ==
Name of the award ceremony, year presented, category, nominee of the award, and the result of the nomination
Award ceremony	Year	Category	Nominee / Work	Result	Ref.
KBS Drama Awards	2008	Best Young Actor	Returned Earthen Bowl	Nominated	
