= Bang Jae-min =

South Korean singer and actor (born 1999)

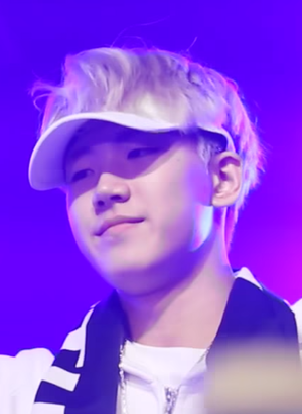
- Bang in June 2017
- Born: March 26, 1999 (age 26); Ansan, South Korea
- Other names: a.mond
- Occupations: Actor; rapper
- Years active: 2017–present
- Agent: PLVL Entertainment

Korean name
- Hangul: 방재민
- RR: Bang Jaemin
- MR: Pang Chaemin

Bang Jae-min (Korean: 방재민; born March 26, 1999), is a South Korean actor and rapper. He debuted as an actor on Top Management (2018). He also participated in the first two seasons of Mnet's rap competition show, High School Rapper.

== Career ==
=== 2017–2019: High School Rapper and acting debut ===
Bang participated in the first season of Mnet's rap competition show, High School Rapper, in February 2017. He was eliminated at the regional competition round, but was brought back by the judges after barely surviving the revival match. He finished at the semi-final round, losing at 1:1 match.

In 2018, Bang participated once again on High School Rapper franchise in its second season. Eventually, he finished for the second time at the semi-final round.

On April 23, 2018, Amoeba Culture revealed that Bang had signed an exclusive contract with them since last year, having previously turned down offers from major agencies such as SM Entertainment and YG Entertainment. Two days later, Bang was confirmed to have his acting debut on Youtube Red's original series, Top Management. He also contributed to the series' OST by releasing "Me In (Feat. Chancellor)", which was a rearranged version of the song included in the EP of S.O.U.L, the series' fictional band.

On April 30, 2019, Bang terminated his exclusive contract with Amoeba Culture because of health reasons.

=== 2021-present: Acting endeavors ===
On February 21, 2021, after two years of hiatus, Bang released his debut EP Fairy Tale: Lingering with "Snow Man" as the lead single. The EP was started to be prepared by him from February 2020.

Bang signed an exclusive contract with PLVL Entertainment on December 17, 2021. He released the EP Shape: Alteration as his first work under the agency with "Dot" as the lead single on January 8, 2022.

Exactly a month later, on February 8, 2022, PLVL confirmed that Bang would appear on TVING's Dear X Who Doesn't Love Me as Kim Do-bin, one of the main role's love interests. On October 19, PLVL announced that he would play as a high school student named Heo Jae-hoon on Genie TV's Summer Strike. He also participated in the drama's OST as a feature to tearliner's song "We Swim in Dreams", which released on December 6.

== Discography ==
=== Extended plays ===
List of extended plays, showing selected details
Title	Details
Fairy Tale: Lingering	Released: February 21, 2021; Label: GOL Inc; Formats: Digital download, streaming; Track listing: 1. "Snow Man" (눈사람); 2. "Knot" (매듭); 3. "Ecivda"; 4. "Forest" (숲)
Shape: Alteration	Released: January 8, 2022; Label: PLVL Entertainment; Formats: Digital download, streaming; Track listing: 1. "Trace" (발자국); 2. "E/V"; 3. "From"; 4. "Dot"

== Filmography ==
=== Television series ===
Year	Title	Role	Notes	Ref.
2022	Summer Strike	Heo Jae-hoon	Support role	

=== Web series ===
Year	Title	Role	Notes	Ref.
2018	Top Management	Jang I-rip	Main role	
2022	Dear X Who Doesn't Love Me	Kim Do-bin	Support role	

=== Television shows ===
Year	Title	Role	Notes	Ref.
2017	High School Rapper	Contestant	Eliminated at semi-final round	
2018	High School Rapper 2	Contestant	Eliminated at semi-final round	

=== Music video appearances ===
Year	Song title	Artist	Ref.
2021	"Your Song"	Piano Man	
2023	"Honestly"	LimeLight	
