= List of awards and nominations received by Momoland =

Momoland awards and nominations
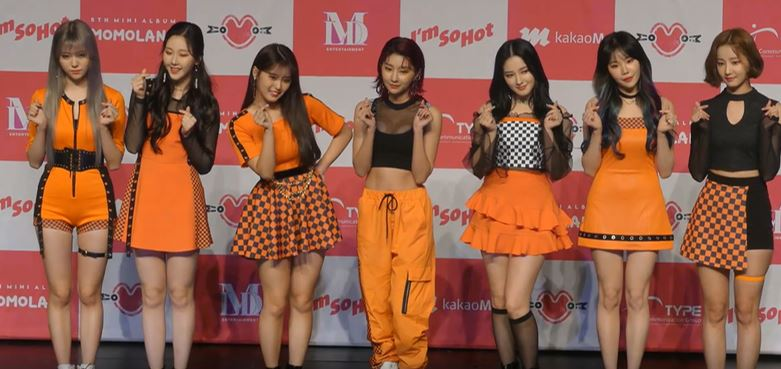
- Momoland in 2019
Awards and nominations
Award	Wins	Nominations
APAN Music Awards	0	2
Asia Artist Awards	4	8
Asia Model Awards	1	1
The Fact Music Awards	1	1
Gaon Chart Music Awards	1	1
Genie Music Awards	1	6
Golden Disc Awards	1	4
Japan Gold Disc Award	1	1
Juventud Awards	0	1
Korea Brand Awards	1	1
Korea Cable TV Awards	1	1
Korea-China Management Awards	1	1
Korea Popular Music Awards	1	5
Korean Arts and Culture Awards	1	1
Korean Culture Entertainment Awards	1	1
Korean Entertainment Arts Awards	1	1
Melon Music Awards	1	4
Mnet Asian Music Awards	1	5
MTN Broadcast Advertising Festival	1	1
MTV Millennial Awards	0	1
Seoul Music Awards	1	8
Soribada Best K-Music Awards	2	9

Totals (Note: Certain award groups do not simply award one winner. They acknowledge several different recipients, have runners-up, and have third place. Since this is a specific recognition and is different from losing an award, runner-up mentions are considered wins in this award tally. For simplification and to avoid errors, each award in this list has been presumed to have had a prior nomination.)
- Wins: 23
- Nominations: 64

This is a list of awards and nominations received by Momoland, a South Korean girl group formed in 2016 by MLD Entertainment. Momoland has received a total of 23 awards out of 64 nominations.

== Awards and nominations ==
Name of the award ceremony, year presented, category, nominee of the award, and the result of the nomination
Award ceremony	Year	Category	Nominee / work	Result	Ref.
APAN Music Awards	2020	Idol Champ Fan's Pick – Group	Momoland	Nominated	
APAN Music Awards	2020	Idol Champ Global Pick – Group	Momoland	Nominated	
Asia Artist Awards	2017	Rising Star Award	Momoland	Won	
Asia Artist Awards	2018	Best Icon Award – Music	Momoland	Won	
Asia Artist Awards	2018	Popularity Award – Singer	Momoland	Nominated	
Asia Artist Awards	2019	Choice Award	Momoland	Won	
Asia Artist Awards	2019	Popularity Award – Singer	Momoland	Nominated	
Asia Artist Awards	2019	StarNews Popularity Award – Female Group	Momoland	Nominated	
Asia Artist Awards	2020	AAA x Choeaedol Popularity Award – Female	Momoland	Nominated	
Asia Artist Awards	2021	Best Choice Award	Momoland	Won	
Asia Model Awards	2017	New Star Singer	Momoland	Won	
The Fact Music Awards	2019	Artist of the Year (Bonsang)	Momoland	Won	
Gaon Chart Music Awards	2018	World K-Pop Rookie	Momoland	Won	
Genie Music Awards	2018	The Top Artist	Momoland	Nominated	
Genie Music Awards	2018	The Female Group	Momoland	Nominated	
Genie Music Awards	2018	Discovery of the Year	Momoland	Nominated	
Genie Music Awards	2018	Genie Music Popularity Award	Momoland	Nominated	
Genie Music Awards	2018	The Top Music	"Bboom Bboom"	Nominated	
Genie Music Awards	2018	The Performing Artist – Female	"Bboom Bboom"	Won	
Golden Disc Awards	2019	Digital Daesang	"Bboom Bboom"	Nominated	
Golden Disc Awards	2019	Digital Bonsang	"Bboom Bboom"	Won	
Golden Disc Awards	2019	Popularity Award	Momoland	Nominated	
Golden Disc Awards	2019	NetEase Most Popular K-pop Star	Momoland	Nominated	
Japan Gold Disc Award	2019	Best 3 New Artist (Asia)	Momoland	Won	
Juventud Awards	2022	Best Girl Power Collab	"Yummy Yummy Love"	Nominated	
Korea Brand Awards	2018	Idol of the Year	Momoland	Won	
Korea Cable TV Awards	2018	Artist of the Year	Momoland	Won	
Korea-China Management Awards	2017	Asia Rising Star	Momoland	Won	
Korea Popular Music Awards	2018	Best Artist	Momoland	Nominated	
Korea Popular Music Awards	2018	Bonsang Award	Momoland	Won	
Korea Popular Music Awards	2018	Popularity Award	Momoland	Nominated	
Korea Popular Music Awards	2018	Best Digital Song	"Bboom Bboom"	Nominated	
Korea Popular Music Awards	2018	Group Dance Award	"Bboom Bboom"	Nominated	
Korean Arts and Culture Awards	2020	Korean Wave Idol Award	Momoland	Won	
Korean Culture Entertainment Awards	2017	K-Pop Artist Award	Momoland	Won	
Korean Entertainment Arts Awards	2020	Group Singer Award	Momoland	Won	
Melon Music Awards	2018	Best Song Award	"Bboom Bboom"	Nominated	
Melon Music Awards	2018	Best Dance – Female	"Bboom Bboom"	Nominated	
Melon Music Awards	2018	Top 10 Artists	Momoland	Nominated	
Melon Music Awards	2018	1theK Performance Award	Momoland	Won	
Mnet Asian Music Awards	2017	Artist of the Year	Momoland	Nominated	
Mnet Asian Music Awards	2017	Best New Female Artist	Momoland	Nominated	
Mnet Asian Music Awards	2018	Artist of the Year	Momoland	Nominated	
Mnet Asian Music Awards	2018	Best Female Group	Momoland	Nominated	
Mnet Asian Music Awards	2018	Discovery of the Year	Momoland	Won	
MTN Broadcast Advertising Festival	2018	Rookie Star Award	Momoland	Won	
MTV Millennial Awards	2022	Dominio K-Pop	Momoland	Nominated	
Seoul Music Awards	2017	Bonsang Award	Momoland	Nominated	
Seoul Music Awards	2018	Bonsang Award	Momoland	Nominated	
Seoul Music Awards	2018	Popularity Award	Momoland	Nominated	
Seoul Music Awards	2018	Hallyu Special Award	Momoland	Nominated	
Seoul Music Awards	2019	Bonsang Award	Momoland	Won	
Seoul Music Awards	2019	Daesang Award	Momoland	Nominated	
Seoul Music Awards	2019	Popularity Award	Momoland	Nominated	
Seoul Music Awards	2019	Hallyu Special Award	Momoland	Nominated	
Soribada Best K-Music Awards	2018	Daesang Award	Momoland	Nominated	
Soribada Best K-Music Awards	2018	Bonsang Award	Momoland	Won	
Soribada Best K-Music Awards	2018	Female Popularity Award	Momoland	Nominated	
Soribada Best K-Music Awards	2018	Global Fandom Award	Momoland	Nominated	
Soribada Best K-Music Awards	2019	Bonsang Award	Momoland	Won	
Soribada Best K-Music Awards	2019	Daesang Award	Momoland	Nominated	
Soribada Best K-Music Awards	2019	Female Popularity Award	Momoland	Nominated	
Soribada Best K-Music Awards	2020	Bonsang Award	Momoland	Nominated	
Soribada Best K-Music Awards	2020	Female Popularity Award	Momoland	Nominated	
