= High School Rapper season 1 =

2017 South Korean survival TV show

High School Rapper
- Season 1
- No. of episodes: 8

Release
- Original network: Mnet
- Original release: February 10 – March 31, 2017

Season chronology
- Next → Season 2

High School Rapper (Korean: 고등래퍼) is a 2017 South Korean survival hip hop TV show. It aired on Mnet starting February 10, 2017 and was hosted by Jeong Jun-ha and Haha. In March, 2017, it was confirmed by Mnet that the show will have a second season.

- Korean Name
- Hangul: 고등래퍼
- Revised Romanization: godeung raepeo
- McCune–Reischauer: kodŭng raep'ŏ

== Season overview ==
=== Mentors ===
- YDG, Swings, Deepflow, Mad Clown, Jessi, Seo Chul-gu & Giriboy

=== Preliminary round – events ===
From episode 1 to episode 3 preliminary round was on air. High school students from six areas participated in the preliminary round. Only ten students survived in each area.

- Controversy over participant's personality: There was controversy over personality from the first episode. Jang Yong-jun was at the center of the controversy. Jang Yong-jun got compliment from mentors for showing extraordinary rap skills, especially Swings at episode 1. However the next day, his improper behavior as a student (prostitution and drinking) was widely broadcast over the media. Also, being known that he is a son of politician Jang Jae-won, he resigned from the program.
- Middle school rapper Shin Yo-chan: Although Shin Yo-chan appeared at episode 3 for a short time, he is known to have made a strong impression. He suddenly appeared in the stage and said "I came here to see which rappers are running wild in this area." He age was only 15. He showed the audience funny rap and made many people laugh out loud. At last, he announced that he would participate in another rap competition program "Show me the Money 6" and many people are looking forward to advance of his rap skill.
- Participation of Kim Dong-hyun, Mark Lee: Participation of Kim Dong-hyun, Mark Lee drew much interest even before "High school Rapper" aired. Known as popular entertainers/idols rather than a rapper, people found it interesting to evaluate their rap skills under the same conditions of other rappers. Some people expected their ability to be overestimated because of their popularity. However, both of them survived from preliminary round.

== Contestants ==
Color key

- The contestant reached the regional competition
- The contestant reached the final round

#	Seoul – Gangdong	Seoul – Gangseo	East Gyeongin	West Gyeongin	Gwangju – Jeolla	Busan – Gyeongsang
1	Kim Sun-jae	Yang Hong-won	Choi Ha-min	Kim Kyu-heon	Choi Seo-hyun	Jo Won-woo
2	Jo Min-wook	Kim Yoon-ho	Kim Kang-woo	Shin Sang-ik	Hwang In-woong	Park Ka-ram
3	Bang Jae-min	Park Hee-chan	Yoon Byung-ho	Oh Dam-ryul	Park Sung-gon	Lee Dong-min
4	Jang Yong-jun	Shin Sang-ho	Hwang Hyun-woo	Park Go-hoon	Kim Woo-hyun	Woo Sang-woo
5	Lee Ji-eun	Han Ji-suk	Lee Soo-rin	Kim Tae-yeob	Lee Sin-haeng	Hwang Hye-jung
6	Johny Kwony	Mark Lee	Choi Suk-hyun	Kim Dong-hyun	Park Min	Sung Yong-hyun
7	Kim Sang Min	Kim Jong-bum	Kim Ha-on	Kim Hye-jung	Choi Yi-seung-woo	Kim Jae-yeon
7	Kim Sang Min	Kim Jong-bum	Kim Ha-on	Kim Hye-jung	Choi Yi-seung-woo	Lee Hyun-woo
8	Kim Sun-woo	Lee Seung-pyo	Choi Shin-hyun	Oh Dong-hwan	Lee Ki-hoon*	Jung In-seol*
9	Park Uh-jin	Kang Seung-wan	Kim Mi-jung	Kim Chan-soo	Kim Joon	Park Sang-bum

=== Cypher battle ===
Right after preliminary round, cypher battle mission was given to some contestants. Contestants from each area competed with each student who received the same grade from other areas. Contestants who won first, third, sixth place should compete in cypher battles. Contestants should create lyrics on the spot and show his/her rap with the beat that mentors offer.

- 1st cypher:

- contestant: Kim Sun-jae, Yang Hong-won, Choi Ha-min, Kim Kyu-heon, Choi Seo-hyun, Jo Won-woo
- beat: Kid ink-Be real(), desiigner – panda()
- winner: Choi Ha-min

- 3rd cypher:

- contestant:Bang Jae-min, Park Hee-chan, Yoon Byung-ho, Oh Dam-ryul, Park Sung-gon, Lee Dong-min
- beat: Fetty wap-679()
- winner: Oh Dam-ryul (Chin Chilla)

- 6th cypher:

- contestant: Johny, Mark Lee, Choi Suk-hyun, Kim Dong-hyun, Park Min, Sung Yong-hyun
- beat: DJ Bob&Fabobeatz ft B-Will- Twerk 4 IT(), The Notorious B.I.G – Hypnotize()
- winner: Choi Suk-hyun

=== 1 vs 1 battle ===
At high school rapper episode 7, 1 vs 1 battle was on air. 100 audience voted to the rapper and loser dropped out.

A	Result	B
Kim Kyu-heon	81:19	Jung In-seol
Mark Lee	57:43	Bang Jae-min
Kim Sun-jae	53:47	Kim Yoon-ho
Kim Tae-yeob	11:89	Jo Won-woo
Kim Dong-hyun	31:69	Lee Dong-min
Yang Hong-won	56:44	Choi Ha-min

=== Final ===
- Winner: Yang Hong-won (Young B)
- Runners-up:
1. Choi Ha-min (Osshun Gum)
2. Jo Won-woo (H2ADIN)
3. Kim Sun-jae (SNZAE)
4. Lee Dong-min (RAPTO/ICE PUFF)
5. Kim Kyu-heon (HUNNYHUNNA)
6. Mark Lee

== Track listing ==
=== Regional competition ===
Highschool Rapper Regional Competition, Pt. 1
No.	Title	Artists	Length
1.	"Seoul Caliber" (서울구경)	Deepflow, Jo Won-woo (H2ADIN), Jung In-seol (JISSCLASS) & Lee Dong-min (RAPTO)	3:00
2.	"Jinttobaegi" (진또배기)	YDG, Choi Seo-hyun (CHOI), Hwang In-woong (YoungW), Lee Ki-hoon (EVIL)	03:20
Total length:			06:20

Highschool Rapper Regional Competition, Pt. 2
No.	Title	Artist(s)	Length
1.	"I'm Good"	Jessi & Kim Dong-hyun (MC Gree)	03:00
2.	"Bully"	Mad Clown & Kim Sun-jae	03:34
3.	"Bunzi"	Giriboy, Xitsuh & Yang Hong-won (Young B)	03:50
4.	"Naw Mean"	Swings & Choi Ha-min (Osshun Gum)	03:40
Total length:			14:04

=== Final ===
Highschool Rapper FINAL
No.	Title	Artists	Length
1.	"The Boy with Glory"	Lee Dong-min (RAPTO) feat. Don Mills & G2	03:44
2.	"Bell"	Kim Sun-jae feat. Hyolyn	03:28
3.	"Star"	Kim Kyu-heon feat. Jessi & Babylon	04:19
4.	"Drop"	Mark feat. Seulgi	02:57
5.	"Come for you"	Choi Ha-min (Osshun Gum) feat. Homeboy & FNRL	03:51
6.	"Home"	Jo Won-woo (H2ADIN) feat. Samuel Seo & Nucksal	03:02
7.	"Better Man"	Yang Hong-won (Young B) feat. Crucial Star	04:06
8.	"Rhyme Travel"	Yang Hong-won (Young B) feat. Tiger JK	03:43
Total length:			29:10

=== Chart performance ===
Title	Peak chart position	Sales	Album
Title	KOR	Sales	Album
"Bunzi" (Giriboy, Seo Chul-gu, Young B)	28	KOR: 135,486+	Highschool Rapper Regional Competition, Pt. 2
"Come For You" (Osshun Gum feat. HOMEBOY & FNRL.)	10	KOR: 205,837+	Highschool Rapper FINAL
"Bell" (종) (Kim Sun-jae feat. Hyolyn)	28	KOR: 93,832	Highschool Rapper FINAL
"Drop" (두고가) (Mark feat. Seulgi)	93	KOR: 46,443	Highschool Rapper FINAL
"Better Man" (Young B feat. Crucial Star)	52	KOR: 54,701	Highschool Rapper FINAL
"Home" (집) (H2ADIN feat. Samuel Seo & Nucksal)	—	KOR: 16,905	Highschool Rapper FINAL
"Rhyme Travel" (Young B feat. Tiger JK)	—	KOR: 19,114	Highschool Rapper FINAL
"—" denotes releases that did not chart or were not released in that territory.

== Ratings ==
Average TV viewership ratings
Ep.	Original broadcast date	Average audience share
Ep.	Original broadcast date	Nielsen Korea (Nationwide)
1	February 10, 2017	0.875% (38th)
2	February 17, 2017	1.169% (17th)
3	February 24, 2017	1.161% (16th)
4	March 3, 2017	1.154% (10th)
5	March 10, 2017	1.215% (19th)
6	March 17, 2017	1.044% (11th)
7	March 24, 2017	1.082% (32nd)
8	March 31, 2017	1.25% (28th)
In the table above, the blue numbers represent the lowest ratings and the red numbers represent the highest ratings.
