= Sik-K =

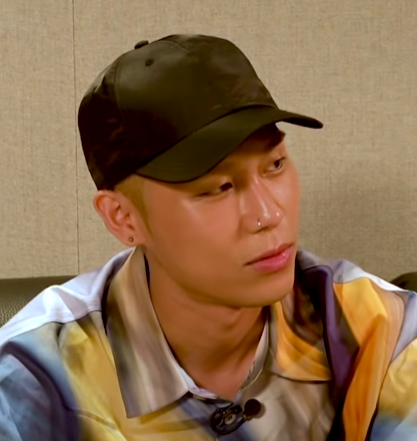
- Sik-K in 2020

Background information
- Born: Kwon Min-sik; February 26, 1994 (age 32); Seoul, South Korea
- Genres: K-hip hop; R&B
- Occupations: Rapper; singer
- Instrument: Vocals
- Years active: 2015–present
- Label: KC

Korean name
- Hangul: 권민식
- RR: Gwon Minsik
- MR: Kwŏn Minsik

Kwon Min-sik (Korean: 권민식; born February 26, 1994), known professionally as Sik-K (식케이), is a South Korean rapper. His stage name is derived from the English ordering of his birth name, Min-sik Kwon, with "Sik-K" taken from "-sik Kwon". He appeared on Show Me the Money 4 in 2015, and released his first EP Flip in 2016. Sik-K was signed to H1GHR Music from 2017 to 2022, before founding his own label in 2023. He has received awards from the Korean Hip-hop Awards and the Korean Music Awards.

== Early life and education ==
Kwon Min-sik was born on February 26, 1994, and has an older sister. He attended Balsan Middle School, and subsequently moved to Vancouver, Canada with his family, where he attended Dr. Charles Best Secondary School. After his graduation, Kwon returned to South Korea. He majored in Business Administration at Sejong University, and later dropped out.

== Career ==
In 2015, Sik-K first garnered attention on Show Me the Money 4. Shortly after, Sik-K appeared on Jay Park's 2015 album WORLDWIDE on the track "F*ckboy" as a featured artist alongside other South Korean rappers BewhY and Ugly Duck. He released his first EP, Flip, on July 20, 2016. Kwon was also active as a member of Yelows Mob, a Korean hip-hop collective that toured Europe that year. Sik-K became associated with a melodic style that blends rapping and singing, and he has said that he prefers not to define his releases only within traditional hiphop categories. Sik-K joined Jay Park's label H1GHR Music upon its founding in 2017 and in 2022, left the label when his contract expired. In 2023, Kwon created his own label under the name KC or Kwonminsik Company.

== Personal life ==
Kwon enlisted in the army for his mandatory military enlistment on June 29, 2020. His label H1GHR Music announced his discharge in December 2021.

== Legal issues ==
In May 2025, Sik-K was sentenced by the Seoul Western District Court to ten months in prison, with a two year suspension, for charges related to drug use. The court also ordered probation and 40 hours of drug relapse prevention education. According to prosecutors, the charges included the use of ketamine and ecstasy in October 2023, and the smoking and possession of marijuana in January 2024.

In April 2026, prosecutors appealed the first-trial sentence and again requested a prison sentence of three years and six months. His legal representatives asked the court to dismiss the appeal, citing his voluntary confession and stating that he had remained off drugs for two years.

Following the first-trial sentence, Sik-K's scheduled appearance at Waterbomb Seoul 2025 drew media attention because prosecutors had appealed the ruling and the case was remained ongoing. Waterbomb later stated that it planned to proceed with the appearance, while also saying that the decision could be reviewed depending on the appeal result and changes in public response. In April 2026, Sik-K appeared by video during HAON's final-stage performance on Show Me the Money 12, which aired on the same day as his first appeal hearing.

== Awards and nominations ==
Year	Award	Category	Work / Recipient	Result
2017	Korean Hip-hop Awards	Collaboration of the Year	"Eung Freestyle" — LIVE, Sik-K, Punchnello, Owen Ovadoz, and Flowsik	Won
2025	Korean Hip-hop Awards	Artist of the Year	Sik-K	Won
2025	Korean Hip-hop Awards	Collaboration of the Year	"FASHO"	Won
2025	Korean Hip-hop Awards	Music Video of the Year	"KC (BUST IT DOWN)" — Sik-K and HAON featuring Leellamarz	Won
2026	Korean Hip-hop Awards	Artist of the Year	Sik-K	Won
2026	Korean Hip-hop Awards	Hip-hop Album of the Year	K-FLIP+ — Sik-K and Lil Moshpit	Won
2026	Korean Hip-hop Awards	Hip-hop Track of the Year	"LOV3" — Sik-K and Lil Moshpit featuring Bryan Chase and Okasian	Won
2026	Korean Hip-hop Awards	Collaboration of the Year	"LOV3" — Sik-K and Lil Moshpit featuring Bryan Chase and Okasian	Won
2026	Korean Hip-hop Awards	Best Rap & Hip-hop Album	K-FLIP+ — Sik-K and Lil Moshpit	Won
2026	Korean Hip-hop Awards	Best Rap & Hip-hop Song	"LOV3" — Sik-K and Lil Moshpit	Won

== Discography ==
=== Studio albums ===
Title	Album details	Peak chart positions	Sales
Title	Album details	KOR	Sales
FL1P	Released: February 26, 2019; Label: H1ghr Music; Formats: CD, digital download; Track listing: 1. "Flip : FL1P"; 2. "Noizy"; 3. "19 Cayenne Freestyle"; 4. "Vanessa" (with Crush); 5. "Love Aches"; 6. "Fxck.That.Flower"; 7. "Outta My Head"; 8. "Mi Casa Es Tu Casa" (with Jessi & The Quiett); 9. "Xibal"; 10. "Addict"; 11. "Fire"; 12. "Runnin'"; 13. "R.I.P (Rest in Party)"; 14. "Sorry (1000)" (with Crush)	28	KOR: 2,541
Headliner	Released: June 11, 2020; Label: H1ghr Music; Formats: CD, digital download; Track listing: 1. "Headliner Str8bars (Big Celebration)"; 2. "RSVP"; 3. "Uno Gotta Run"; 4. "Need Her"; 5. "Hater" (with Haon); 6. "Joe"; 7. "Darling" (with Crush); 8. "New Love"; 9. "She's Gone"; 10. "Addy" (with Moon); 11. "Too Picky"; 12. "12:45"; 13. "Nirvana"; 14. "Bae"; 15. "IBTFY" (with pH-1); 16. "Tell Ya!"	32	KOR: 2,720
Pop A Lot	Released: August 9, 2023; Label: KC, Dreamus; Formats: CD, digital download; Track listing: 1. "Stupid I Guess"; 2. "See You in Every Party"; 3. "5882 (Oppa ASAP)"; 4. "Exotic & Toxic"; 5. "The Sik"; 6. "I Wonder" (featuring Big Naughty); 7. "Got Lost"; 8. "On the Phone" (featuring Uhm Jung-hwa); 9. "Sorry, I Hate You" (featuring B.I); 10. "Can You Not?" (featuring Leellamarz); 11. "Dirty" (featuring Be'O); 12. "Give Me Lit" (featuring M Huncho); 13. "Stay"; 14. "PLUTO PLUTo PLUto PLuto Pluto"; 15. "Alright" (featuring pH-1, Haon & Jay Park); 16. "Plz"; 17. "28"	54	KOR: 1,486

=== Extended plays ===
Title	EP details	Peak chart positions	Sales
Title	EP details	KOR	Sales
Flip	Released: July 20, 2016; Label: OTC; Formats: Digital download; Track listing: 1. "Zero Fucks Is Given"; 2. "Cha Cha"; 3. "Rendezvous"; 4. "No Where" (featuring Loco); 5. "Act Different" (featuring Mac Kidd); 6. "God Damn"; 7. "Habibi"; 8. "Don't Play" (featuring Punchnello); 9. "I Call It Love"; 10. "Alcohol" (with Jay Park); 11. "#yelowsmobbin"	—	
H.A.L.F (Have.A.Little.Fun)	Released: June 5, 2017; Label: H1ghr Music; Formats: CD, digital download; Track listing: 1. "Ring Ring" (with Gaeko); 2. "Party (Shut Down)" (with Crush); 3. "Henny"; 4. "Chit Chat Ting" (with Herr Nayne); 5. "Too Many" (with Jay Park); 6. "Interlude: 24 7 365"; 7. "XYZ"; 8. "A Lil Bit" (with Simon Dominic and The Quiett); 9. "Somebody Else"; 10. "Have a Little Fun" (with DPR Live)	39	KOR: 750
Boycold	Released: September 21, 2017; Label: H1ghr Music; Formats: CD, digital download; Track listing: 1. "Your Night"; 2. "Earphone"; 3. "Get That Money"; 4. "Ex" (with Cha Cha Malone); 5. "H1gher Gang" (with Jay Park and pH-1)	43	
Trapart	Released: January 19, 2018; Label: H1ghr Music; Formats: Digital download; Track listing: 1. "Young Boy"; 2. "YeLowS Gang" (with Herr Nayne and Woodie Gochild); 3. "Fuck It Up"; 4. "Link Up"; 5. "Another 0" (with The Quiett); 6. "Never Know" (with Loco); 7. "Lil Baby"; 8. "Not My Type"; 9. "Boom" (with Loopy); 10. "Choppy" (with Herr Nayne); 11. "Never Know" (with Ye Ali)	—	
Officially OG	Released: March 24, 2020; Label: H1ghr Music; Formats: Digital download; Track listing: 1. "VJ Is Classic"; 2. "No Hook" (with Paloalto and The Quiett); 3. "Hear Me"; 4. "30min" (with Simon Dominic); 5. "Soap Seoul"; 6. "Season Off"; 7. "Do Main 2020" (with Lil Boi, Takewon, Ugly Duck & Zico); 8. "Water" (with Haon, Jay Park, Woodie Gochild & pH-1)	—	
"—" denotes releases that did not chart.

=== Collaborative albums and mixtapes ===
Title	Album details
S.O.S (Sink Or Swim) (with Coogie)	Released: September 24, 2019; Label: H1ghr Music; Formats: Digital download; Track listing: 1. "Drowning"; 2. "Two Everything" (with Giriboy); 3. "Wet the Bed"; 4. "Goin' Up"; 5. "Summer Snack" (with The Quiett); 6. "h1gherATM Freestyle"
Album on the Way! (with Haon)	Released: May 18, 2023; Label: KC; Formats: Digital download; Track listing: 1. "Shawty Wanna Wait"; 2. "Crash Mercedes"; 3. "Bitch Boy" (featuring Leellamarz); 4. "Maybe I'm Kcrazy"; 5. "Balaclava Babies" (featuring Blase); 6. "POV: God" (featuring Ourealgoat, ShyboyTobii); 7. "I Can't See You"; 8. "Abu Dhabi D-day Freestyle" (featuring Theo); 9. "Locked-In"
3=1 (with Haon and Leellamarz)	Released: February 21, 2024; Label: Ambition Musik; Formats: Digital download
KCTape, Vol. 1 (with Haon and Vangdale)	Released: May 22, 2024; Label: KC; Formats: Digital download; Track listing: 1. "X"; 2. "GIOTL"; 3. "Hella Dope" (featuring Icecream Drum, Leellamarz and White Punk); 4. "Go DJ" (featuring Jibin); 5. "Cybertruck Beastmode"; 6. "Beat the Case"; 7. "I Like It" (featuring Leellamarz); 8. "Sohohouse Paris"; 9. "What the Deal" (featuring Coogie)
KCTape, Vol. 2 (with Haon and Vangdale)	Released: July 30, 2024; Label: KC; Formats: Digital download
K-Flip (with Lil Moshpit)	Released: January 8, 2025; Label: KC, AT AREA; Formats: Digital download
KC2.5 (with Haon, Jmin, Nowimyoung and vangdale)	Released: August 8, 2025; Label: KC; Formats: Digital download

=== Singles ===
==== As lead artist ====
Title	Year	Peak chart positions	Sales	Album
Title	Year	KOR	Sales	Album
"Better Life"	2015	—		Non-album singles
"Untitled" (제목미정) (featuring Crucial Star and Taylor)	2015	—		Non-album singles
"I Call It Love"	2016	—		Flip
"No Where" (featuring Loco)	2016	—		Flip
"Rendezvous" (랑데뷰)	2016	—		Flip
"Ring Ring" (featuring Gaeko)	2016	—		H.A.L.F (Have.A.Little.Fun)
"Fly"	2017	—		H.A.L.F (Have.A.Little.Fun)
"Party (Shut Down)" (featuring Crush)	2017	97	KOR: 21,820	H.A.L.F (Have.A.Little.Fun)
"Your Night" (너의 밤)	2017	—		Boycold
"Choppy" (마음이) (featuring Herr Nayne)	2018	—		Trapart
"Yellows Gang" (featuring Herr Nayne and Woodie Gochild)	2018	—		Trapart
"Plus It"	2018	—		Non-album singles
"Skip and Kiss" (그래 그냥 내게 바로)	2018	—		Non-album singles
"Xibal" (X발)	2018	—		FL1P
"Fire"	2018	—		FL1P
"Addict"	2019	—		FL1P
"Noizy"	2019	—		FL1P
"Why You?"	2019	—		Non-album singles
"Is It Love?" (featuring Moon Su-jin)	2019	—		Non-album singles
"Water" (featuring Woodie Gochild, pH-1, Haon and Jay Park)	2019	—		Officially OG
"Hear Me" (몰라)	2020	—		Officially OG
"Tell Ya!"	2020	—		Headliner
"Darling" (달링) (featuring Crush)	2020	—		Headliner
"5882 (Oppa ASAP)"	2023	—		Pop a Lot
"See You in Every Party"	2023	—		Pop a Lot
"Trap" (featuring Jimmy Paige)	2024	—		Non-album single
"Lov3" (featuring Bryan Chase and Okasian)	2025	103		K-Flip+
"Karma Collector" (with Haon and Nowimyoung)	2026	137		KC3
"—" denotes releases that did not chart.

==== Collaborations ====
Title	Year	Peak chart positions	Sales	Album
Title	Year	KOR	Sales	Album
"Respect" (with Lil Boi and Geegooin, featuring Loco, Gray and DJ Pumkin)	2015	6	KOR: 411,916	Show Me the Money 4
"Stylin'" (with Supreme Boi and Elles)	2016	—		Non-album single
"Decalcomanie" (데칼코마니) (with Imlay)	2017	—		SM Station Season 2
"Just U" (with Jeong Se-woon)	2017	24	KOR: 130,091	Ever
"Iffy" (with pH-1 and Jay Park)	2017	99	KOR: 20,106	Non-album singles
"Garasadae" (가라사대) (with pH-1 and Woodie Gochild)	2018	—		Non-album singles
"On The Road" (with Ted Park, pH-1 and Woodie Gochild)	2018	—		Non-album singles
"Kitkat" (with Woodie Gochild, Haon and pH-1)	2018	—		Non-album singles
"All Night" (까만밤) (with Soyou)	2018	59		Re:Fresh
"119 Remix" (with various artists)	2018	— (Note: "119 Remix" did not enter the Gaon Digital Chart, but it peaked at number 47 on the component Download Chart.)		Non-album singles
"The Fearless Ones" (with The Quiett, Beenzino and Changmo)	2019	—		Non-album singles
"Giddy Up" (with Haon, pH-1, Woodie Gochild and Jay Park)	2019	120		Non-album singles
"Gang Official Remix" (with pH-1, Jay Park and Haon)	2020	4		Non-album singles
"TTM" (with B.I and Reddy)	2023	—		Non-album singles
"Day Off" (with Haon)	2023	—		Non-album singles
"KC (Bust It Down)" (with Haon, featuring Leellamarz)	2024	—		Non-album singles
"Tell Me Tell Me" (as M-Flo Loves Sik-K)	2026	—		M-Flo's Superliminal
"—" denotes releases that did not chart.

=== Other charted songs ===
Title	Year	Peak chart positions	Album
Title	Year	KOR	Album
"Don't Be Shy" (Crush featuring Sik-K)	2017	88	Outside
"Yacht (K)" (Jay Park featuring Sik-K)	2017	34	Non-album single
"VVIP" (Jo Woo-chan featuring Sik-K and Gaeko)	2017	43	Show Me the Money 6
"Boong-Boong" (붕붕) (Haon featuring Sik-K)	2018	3	High School Rapper 2
"Easy" (Wheein featuring Sik-K)	2018	36	Soar
"Watch Me Ballin'" (빌어먹을 인연) (Coogie featuring Sik-K)	2018	72	Show Me the Money 777

== Music videos ==
=== Official music videos ===
Year	Title	Album
2015	"Better Life"	My Man
2016	"알콜은 싫지만 주면 마실 수 밖에" ("Alcohol") (feat. Jay Park)	FLIP
2016	"랑데뷰" ("Rendezvous")	FLIP
2017	"FLY" (prod. Groovy Room)	H.A.L.F (Have.A.Little.Fun)
2017	"party (SHUT DOWN)" (feat.Crush)	H.A.L.F (Have.A.Little.Fun)
2017	"내일 모레" ("Get that Money") (Prod. BOYCOLD)	BOYCOLD
2017	"너의 밤" ("Your Night") (Prod. BOYCOLD)	BOYCOLD
2017	"이어폰" ("Earphone") (Prod. BOYCOLD)	BOYCOLD
2018	"YeLowS Gang" (feat. Herr Nayne, Woodie Gochild) (prod. GroovyRoom)	TRAPART
2018	"그래 그냥 내게 바로" ("Skip And Kiss") (Prod. GroovyRoom)	youth.wit.purpose
2018	"FIRE" (Prod. GroovyRoom)	FL1P
2019	"ADDICT" (Prod. Girlnexxtdoor)	FL1P
2019	"NOIZY" (Prod. GroovyRoom)	FL1P
2019	"LOVE ACHES + VANESSA" (Prod. BOYCOLD)	FL1P
2019	"WATER" (Feat. Woodie Gochild, pH-1, 김하온(HAON), Jay Park) (Prod. GooseBumps)	Non-album single
2019	"침대 노래(Wet The Bed)" (Prod. GXXD)	S.O.S (Sink or Swim)
2020	TELL YA!, DARLING (Feat. Crush) Short Film	Headliner

=== Other music video appearances ===
Year	Title	Artist	Album
2017	"데칼코마니" ("Decalcomanie")	IMLAY and Sik-K	SHURAI
2017	"YACHT (K)" (Dance visual)	Jay Park feat. Sik.K	Yacht (K)
2017	"YACHT (K)" (Choreography video)	Jay Park feat. Sik.K	Yacht (K)
2017	"XINDOSHI"	GroovyRoom feat. Sik.K, Loopy, Masta Wu, 김효은 (Kim Hyo-Eun)	EVERYWHERE
2017	"ADY" ("아침에 다시 얘기해")	Boi B feat. Sik-K	Night Vibe
2017	"JUST U" (prod. GroovyRoom)	Jeong Se-woon feat. Sik-K	The 1st Mini Album, Pt.1 Ever
2017	"Iffy" (prod. GroovyRoom)	Sik-K, Jay Park, pH-1	Iffy
2017	"Hope You're Ruined"	KISSES feat. Sik-K	K1sses
2017	"I'm Good" ("아무렇지 않아")	Bumzu feat. Sik-K	BUMZU 3rd Mini Album '27'
2018	"Easy"	Wheein feat. Sik-K	Magnolia
2019	"The Fearless Ones"	The Quiett, Sik-K, Beenzino, CHANGMO	Non-album single
2019	"GIDDY UP (Prod. GroovyRoom)"	Sik-K, 김하온(HAON), pH-1, Woodie Gochild, 박재범 (Jay Park)	Dingo x H1ghr Music
2020	장성규 – 워크맨 (feat. 식케이, 박재범) (prod. GroovyRoom)	Sik-K, 장성규 (Jang Sung Kyu), 박재범 (Jay Park)	Workman x H1ghr Music
2023	"TTM"	B.I, Sik-K, Reddy	Non-album single
