= Top Management (TV series) =

2018 South Korean web series

- Official poster
- Hangul: 탑 매니지먼트
- RR: Tap maenijimeonteu
- MR: T'ap maenijimŏnt'ŭ
- Genre: Romance; Drama; Fantasy
- Based on: Top Management by Jang Woo-san
- Written by: Jang Eun-mi; Kim Jung-hee; Lim Jung-min; Park Seul-gi; Yoo Su-ji; Yoon Yang-woon
- Directed by: Yoon Sung-ho
- Starring: Seo Eun-soo; Ahn Hyo-seop; Cha Eun-woo; Jung Yoo-ahn; Bang Jae-min
- Country of origin: South Korea
- Original language: Korean
- No. of seasons: 1
- No. of episodes: 16

Production
- Executive producer: Yoon Shin-ae
- Producers: Greg Lee; Sohn Jong-han; Yoo Hye-min
- Running time: 20–43 minutes
- Production company: Studio 329

Original release
- Network: YouTube Premium
- Release: October 31 – November 16, 2018

Top Management (Korean: 탑 매니지먼트) is a 2018 South Korean series that premiered on October 31, 2018, on YouTube Premium. (Note: The first three episodes are currently available for free on the YouTube channel of 1theK.) It is based on an original novel by Jang Woo-san about idols who dream about going on stage, which was published in 2015 by Munpia. The series stars Seo Eun-soo, Ahn Hyo-seop and Cha Eun-woo.

== Synopsis ==
The story centers on Eun-sung, a former girl idol trainee with the power to foresee the future, who becomes the manager of the aspiring, but struggling, boy idol group "S.O.U.L."

== Cast ==
=== Main ===
- Seo Eun-soo as Yoo Eun-sung
- Ahn Hyo-seop as Hyun Soo-yong
- Cha Eun-woo as Woo Yeon-woo
- Jung Yoo-ahn as Kim Tae-oh
- Bang Jae-min as Jang I-rip.

=== Supporting ===
- Lee Joo-seung as LJ / Joo Seung-ri
- Park Hee-von as Kang Jae-young
- Cha Rae-hyung as Kevin
- Park Jong-hwan as Kim Hyun-jo
- Kwon Eun-bin as Eun-bin
- Ji Hye-ran as Song Hae-na
- Kim Ji-min as Park Seul-gi
- Yoo Hye-in as Hailey

=== Cameo ===
- Han Joon-woo as Manager
- Kim Su-hyeon as Pola, member of Apple Mint (ep. 8 and 16)
- Chungha as Chungha (ep. 14)
- Jang Dong-yoon as Dong-yoon (ep. 16)

== Soundtrack ==
- "Gravity Acapella" - S.O.U.L (feat. Mook)
- "Sunshine" - Jung Yoo-ahn & Shin A-rin
- "Together" - Cha Eun-woo
- "Spring" - Ahn Hyo-seop & Z.Hera
- "Me In" - Bang Jae-min (feat. Chancellor)
- "Hold Me" - Park Jin-young
- "Spring" - Lee Won-seok
- "It's Love" - Lee Donghae
- "Camouflage" - Kevin Woo
- "Get Myself With You" - MCKay
- "Sugar Cane" - S.O.U.L (feat. Casper)
- "Get Myself With You" - S.O.U.L
- "Drop The Pen Beat" - S.O.U.L

== Episodes ==
Each episode is named after a k-pop song.

No.	Title	Directed by	Written by	Original release date
1	"Into The New World" (다시 만난 세계)	Yoon Sung-ho	Jang Hu-san	October 31, 2018
2	"Blood Sweat & Tears" (피 땀 눈물)	Yoon Sung-ho	Jang Hu-san	October 31, 2018
3	"Knock Knock"	Yoon Sung-ho	Jang Hu-san	October 31, 2018
4	"Russian Roulette" (러시안 룰렛)	Yoon Sung-ho	Jang Hu-san	October 31, 2018
5	"As for Me (Yes I Am)" (나로 말할 것 같으면)	Yoon Sung-ho	Jang Hu-san	October 31, 2018
6	"Don't Touch Me" (손 대지 마)	Yoon Sung-ho	Jang Hu-san	October 31, 2018
7	"I Don't Care"	Yoon Sung-ho	Jang Hu-san	October 31, 2018
8	"Love Me Right"	Yoon Sung-ho	Jang Hu-san	October 31, 2018
9	"Fake Love"	Yoon Sung-ho	Jang Hu-san	November 16, 2018
10	"Mr. Simple"	Yoon Sung-ho	Jang Hu-san	November 16, 2018
11	"Not Spring, Love, or Cherry Blossoms" (봄 사랑 벚꽃 말고)	Yoon Sung-ho	Jang Hu-san	November 16, 2018
12	"Replay" (누난 너무 예뻐)	Yoon Sung-ho	Jang Hu-san	November 16, 2018
13	"Love Scenario" (사랑을 했다)	Yoon Sung-ho	Jang Hu-san	November 16, 2018
14	"24 Hours" (24시간이 모자라)	Yoon Sung-ho	Jang Hu-san	November 16, 2018
15	"As If It's Your Last" (마지막처럼)	Yoon Sung-ho	Jang Hu-san	November 16, 2018
16	"Me Gustas Tu" (오늘부터 우리는)	Yoon Sung-ho	Jang Hu-san	November 16, 2018
