= Dear X Who Doesn't Love Me =

2022 South Korean web series

- Promotional poster
- Hangul: 나를 사랑하지 않는 X에게
- Lit.: To X Who Doesn't Love Me
- RR: Nareul saranghaji anneun Xege
- MR: Narŭl saranghaji annŭn Xege
- Genre: Drama; Romance
- Developed by: TVING
- Written by: Go Jae-hong; Wang Hye-ji
- Directed by: Go Jae-hong
- Country of origin: South Korea
- Original language: Korean
- No. of episodes: 10

Production
- Producer: Park Sang-hyuk
- Running time: 20 minutes
- Production company: CJ ENM

Original release
- Network: TVING
- Release: July 14 – July 28, 2022

Dear X Who Doesn't Love Me (Korean: 나를 사랑하지 않는 X에게) is a South Korean web series starring Han Ji-hyo, Doyoung, Kwon Ah-reum, and Bang Jae-min. It aired on TVING from July 14 to July 28, 2022.

== Synopsis ==
Seo Hee-soo, a shy college student who aspires to be a lyricist, lacks self-esteem and is inexperienced with love. She intertwined with several men after discovering a mysterious notebook with lyrics that make anyone fall in love with her for one month.

== Cast ==
- Han Ji-hyo as Seo Hee-soo, a college student who wants to become a lyricist. She has been forever alone despite having tried out everything to have a relationship. While struggling with low self-esteem, Hee-soo finds a notebook containing lyrics that can help her succeed in dating.
- Doyoung as Jung Si-ho, a boy who has been loving Hee-soo secretly for a long time. Rather than breaking up a friendship after confessing his feelings, he thinks it is better to hide. However, when Hee-soo starts to hang out with different guys using a lyrics note, Si-ho starts to get afraid that he will lose Hee-soo forever.
- Kwon Ah-reum as Park Se-jin
- Bang Jae-min as Kim Do-bin
- Son Hyun-woo as Kim Gang-wook
- Kim Ji-hoon as Park Joon-young

== Release ==
On 30 June 2022, TVING announced that the first three episodes would be released on 14 July 2022, episodes 4 to 6 would be released on 21 July 2022, and the last four episodes would be released on 28 July 2022.

== Production ==
The series was developed by TVING. It was written by Go Jae-hong and Wang Hye-ji with Go Jae-hong serving as director.
