= Kwon Ah-reum =

South Korean actress (born 1996)

- Born: July 10, 1996 (age 30); Seoul, South Korea
- Occupation: Actress
- Years active: 2020–present
- Agent: Look Media Entertainment

Korean name
- Hangul: 권아름
- RR: Gwon Areum
- MR: Kwŏn Arŭm

Kwon Ah-reum (Korean: 권아름; born July 10, 1996) is a South Korean actress.

== Early life ==
Kwon was born on July 10, 1996, in Seoul, South Korea.

== Career ==
=== 2020–2021: Debut with web series ===
Kwon made her debut in June 2020 with Naver TV's web series Thumbs Up Feeds Me, portraying the lead role of Han Ye-won.

In January 2021, Kwon starred in PickGo's web series Back to the 2008, portraying the lead role of Oh Laura. She won the Best Supporting Actress award for her performance in the series.

=== 2022–present: Film and television debut ===
On February 22, 2022, Kwon signed an exclusive contract with SW Management and Pictures (SWMP). In July 2022, she made her film debut in the omnibus film Body Parts, portraying the lead role of Da-hee in the episode titled "Stink". In the same month, she starred in TVING's web series Dear X Who Doesn't Love Me, playing the lead role of Park Se-jin. In August 2022, she made her television debut in JTBC's Fly High Butterfly, portraying the cameo role of Yoo Eun-jae. In November 2022, she starred in V Live's web series The Witch Store Reopens, playing the supporting role of Yoo Eun-ha. In December 2022, she appeared in the second season of the television series Missing: The Other Side, playing the supporting role of Yang Eun-hee.

In April 2023, Kwon had a cameo role as Young-sil in MBC's television series Joseon Attorney. In the same month, she starred in D Live's web series Last Taxi, portraying the lead role of Yang Soo-hee. In August 2023, she starred in SBS's television series The Killing Vote, playing the supporting role of Joo Min, for which she won the Best New Actress award at the 2023 SBS Drama Awards. In November 2023, she starred in MBC's television series The Story of Park's Marriage Contract, portraying the supporting role of Yoo Ha-na. In December 2023, she appeared in Amazon Prime Video's web series My Man Is Cupid, playing the supporting role of Lee So-hee.

On March 14, 2024, Kwon signed an exclusive contract with Look Media Entertainment.

== Endorsements ==
In May 2022, Kwon was selected as the model for HiteJinro's plum wine brand, Maehwasu.

== Filmography ==
=== Film ===
Film appearances
Year	Title	Role	Notes	Ref.
2022	Body Parts	Da-hee	Episode: "Stink"	

=== Television series ===
Television series appearances
Year	Title	Role	Notes	Ref.
2022	Fly High Butterfly	Yoo Eun-jae	Cameo	
2022	Missing: The Other Side	Yang Eun-hee	Season 2	
2023	Joseon Attorney	Young-sil	Cameo (Episode 5–6)	
2023	The Killing Vote	Joo Min		
2023–2024	The Story of Park's Marriage Contract	Yoo Ha-na		

=== Web series ===
Web series appearances
Year	Title	Role	Ref.
2020	Thumbs Up Feeds Me	Han Ye-won	
2021	Back to the 2008	Oh Laura	
2022	Dear X Who Doesn't Love Me	Park Se-jin	
2022	The Witch Store Reopens	Yoo Eun-ha	
2023	Last Taxi	Yang Soo-hee	
2023–2024	My Man Is Cupid	Lee So-hee	

== Awards and nominations ==
Name of the award ceremony, year presented, category, nominee of the award, and the result of the nomination
Award ceremony	Year	Category	Nominee / Work	Result	Ref.
SBS Drama Awards	2023	Best New Actress	The Killing Vote	Won	
Seoul Webfest	2021	Best Supporting Actress	Back to the 2008	Won	
