= Vinxen =

South Korean rapper (born 2000)

- 이병재
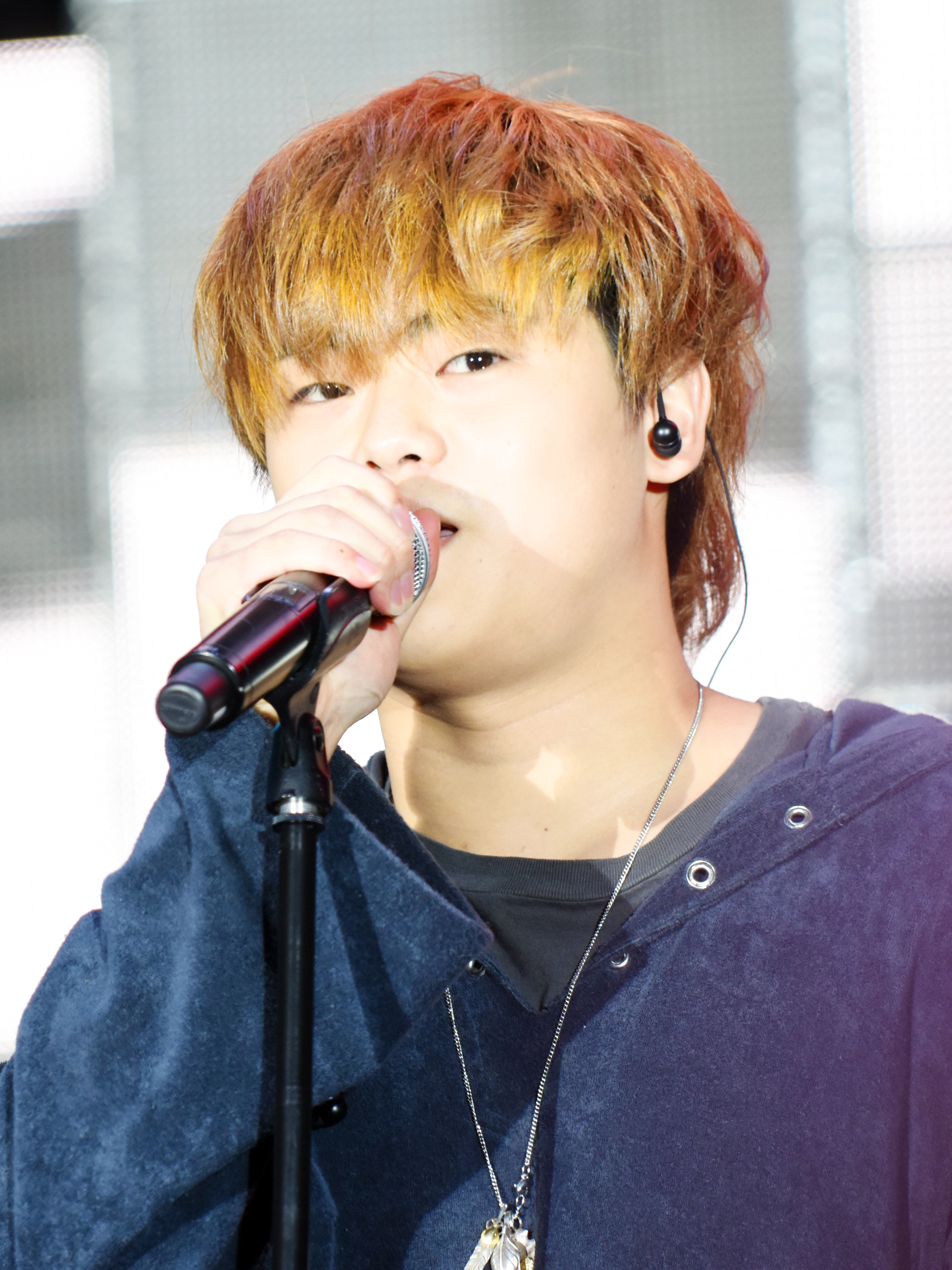
- Vinxen performing at the C-Festival, May 2019
- Born: Lee Byeong-jae; April 20, 2000 (age 26); Incheon, South Korea
- Occupation: Rapper
- Musical career
- Genres: Hip hop
- Instrument: Vocals
- Years active: 2018–present
- Label: Romantic Factory

Korean name
- Hangul: 이병재
- RR: I Byeongjae
- MR: I Pyŏngjae

Lee Byeong-jae (Korean: 이병재; born April 20, 2000), better known by his stage name, Vinxen (빈첸), is a South Korean rapper. He released his debut extended play, Smelting, in 2018, followed by the extended play, Boycold 2, later that year. He released his first full-length album, Boy to Man, in 2020.

== Career ==
=== 2018: Debut ===
In 2018, Lee participated in the South Korean reality show, High School Rapper 2 produced by Mnet. Lee finished in 3rd place. Lee released his first EP on May 9, 2018, titled "재련해도" and had a concert with label mate Ovan in March.

Lee collaborated with another High School Rapper 2 contestant, Haon, whilst on the show. The pair released the song "Bar Code" which swept the charts.

== Artistry ==
=== Influences ===
Lee said that his influence is his label mate Ovan.

== Discography ==
=== Studio albums ===
Title	Album details	Peak chart positions	Sales
Title	Album details	KOR	Sales
Boy to Man (유사인간)	Released: July 9, 2020; Label: Romantic Factory; Formats: CD, digital download	20	KOR: 3,543

=== Extended plays ===
Title	EP details	Peak chart positions	Sales
Title	EP details	KOR	Sales
Smelting (제련해도)	Released: May 9, 2018; Label: Romantic Factory; Formats: CD, digital download	8	KOR: 8,046
Boycold 2	Released: December 27, 2018; Label: Romantic Factory; Formats: CD, digital download	—	
Manta Bipolar Pt.2	Released: April 20, 2021; Label: Romantic Factory; Formats: CD, digital download	—	
"—" denotes releases that did not chart.

=== Singles ===
Title	Year	Peak chart positions	Album
Title	Year	KOR	Album
As lead artist
"Not at All" (feat. Woo Won-jae)	2018	10	High School Rapper 2 Final
"Sinking Down with You"	2018	—	How Do You Feel
"How Do You Feel" (feat. Woo Won-jae)	2018	—	How Do You Feel
"Stingray" (feat. Sik-K)	2018	—	Boycold 2
"Skin" (허물) (feat. Seori)	2019	80	Non-album singles
"Empty" (텅) (feat. Haon)	2019	84	Non-album singles
"Flying High with U"	2021	62	Non-album singles
As featured artist
"Graduation" (Haon feat. Vinxen, Webster B)	2018	—	Non-album single
"Forest Gump" (ZENE the ZILLA feat. Vinxen)	2018	—	zillamode 3 with Eddy Pauer
"My Paradise" (Groovy Room feat. Chung-ha, Vinxen)	2018	36	Non-album single
"One More Night" (Babylon feat. Vinxen)	2018	—	CAELO
"I Will Fight" (Key feat. Vinxen)	2018	—	FACE
"Clique" (Pullik feat. Vinxen)		—	0.5
"Chain" (Im Soo feat. Kuzi, Vinxen)		—	Half Asleep
"GTG" (Os Noma feat. Vinxen)	2019	—	OO
"TT" (Chanakorea feat. Vinxen)	2019	—	Non-album single
"Pray Emoji" (Panda Gomm feat. Hash Swan, Vinxen)	2019	—	Sleeptalking
"Spark" (Sandy feat. Vinxen)	2019	—	Non-album single
"Talk" Dress feat. Sogumm, Vinxen, Sukhoon Chang)	2019	—	Non-album single
"Goaway" (Os Noma feat. GCB, Jambino, Vinxen)	2020	—	Openness Sphere
"Lit" (Leellamarz, Panda Gomm feat. Vinxen)	2020	—	BAMBOOCLUB[B]
Collaborations
"Bar Code" (with Haon)	2018	1	Non-album single
"Jung" (Vinxen, Ovan, Im Soo)	2020	—	Non-album single
"—" denotes releases that did not chart, were not released in that region or have not been checked for charting.

== Filmography ==
=== Television shows ===
Year	Title	Network	Notes
2018	High School Rapper 2	Mnet	Contestant; Finished 3rd
2019	King of Mask Singer	MBC TV	Contestant (Goat)

== Awards and nominations ==
Year	Award	Category	Nominated work	Result	Ref.
2018	MBC Plus X Genie Music Awards	Artist of the Year	—N/a	Nominated	
2018	MBC Plus X Genie Music Awards	Genie Music Popularity Award	—N/a	Nominated	
2018	Melon Music Awards	Top 10 Artists	—N/a	Nominated	
2018	Mnet Asian Music Awards	Best New Male Artist	—N/a	Nominated	
