= White Tuft, the Little Beaver =

- Directed by: Philippe Calderon
- Distributed by: Alliance Atlantis
- Release date: February 22, 2008
- Country: Canada

White Tuft - the Little Beaver (French title: Mèche Blanche, les aventures du petit castor) is a family adventure film released February 22, 2008 in Canada and distributed by Alliance Atlantis. The film is directed by Philippe Calderon. The film follows the adventures of a small beaver called White Tuft.

== Reception ==
The Vancouver Sun gave White Tuft - the Little Beaver three and a half stars. Katherine Monk said that it was "crafted in the same tradition as The Bear, Born Free and March of the Penguins". Abus de Ciné praised the filming. Film Pour Enfants found the Quebecois dubbing overly complicated. Ecran Large was more negative and found the message of the film dubious.
