= GroovyRoom =

South Korean record producer duo

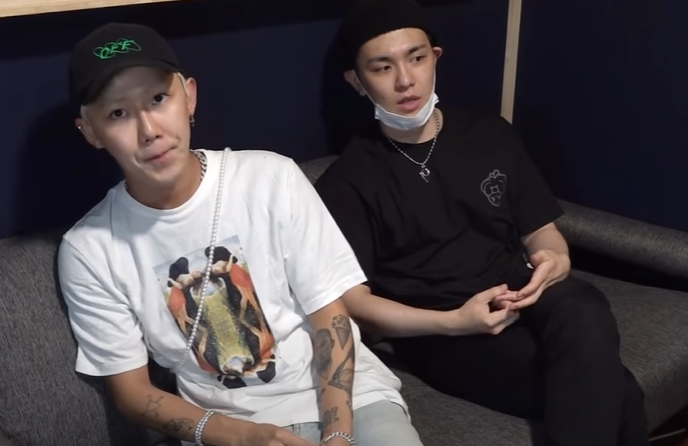
- GroovyRoom in 2020

Background information
- Origin: Seoul, South Korea
- Genres: Hip hop; R&B; dance
- Occupations: Music producers; DJ; Composers
- Years active: 2016–present
- Labels: H1ghr Music; At Area
- Members: Park Gyu-jeong; Lee Hwi-min

GroovyRoom (Korean: 그루비룸) is a South Korean DJ, music producing and composing duo consisting of Park Gyu-jeong and Lee Hwi-min. They mainly produce hip-hop songs such as boom bap and trap. The songs they produce have a producer tag called "Groovy Everywhere".

GroovyRoom released their debut single "Loyalty" in 2016 and their first EP Everywhere in 2017. In 2019, they released their first collaboration project album with Ambition Musik's Leellamarz titled Room Service. They have received several music awards including Producer of the Year at the Korean Hip-hop Awards and Best Hip-hop Maker Award at the Soribada Best K-Music Awards.

In March 2021, the duo announced they had launched AREA, a new label in partnership with their current label H1ghr Music. They have signed singer Gemini and rapper Mirani.

== Member ==
name	details
Lee Hwi-min	Born : August 5, 1994, Incheon, South Korea; Position : producer, DJ; Years active : 2015–present
Park Gyu-jeong	Born : December 12, 1994, Pohang, South Korea; Position : producer, DJ; Years active : 2015–present

== Discography ==
=== Extended plays ===
Title	Album details	Peak chart positions	Sales
Title	Album details	KOR	Sales
Everywhere	Released: July 24, 2017; Label: H1ghr Music, LOEN Entertainment; Formats: CD, digital download	28	KOR 780
Room Service (with LeellaMarz)	Released: September 9, 2019; Label: H1ghr Music, Kakao M; Formats: CD, digital download, streaming	52	

=== Singles ===
Title	Year	Peak chart positions	Sales (DL)	Album
Title	Year	KOR	Sales (DL)	Album
As lead artist
"Loyalty" feat. Ailee, Dok2	2016	—	—N/a	Everywhere
"Sunday" feat. Heize, Jay Park	2017	19	KOR: 85,767	Everywhere
"Somewhere" (어디쯤에) feat. Suran, PH-1	2017	78	KOR: 32,120	Everywhere
"My Paradise" feat. Chungha, Vinxen	2018	36	—N/a	Non-album single
"This Night" (행성) feat. Blue.D & Jhnvor	2019	74	—N/a	This Night
"Face Down" (자유시간) feat. Paul Blanco & Uneducated Kid	2019	—	—N/a	Face Down
"Palette" feat. pH-1	2020	—	—N/a	Find Your Light: Palette #1
"Burn" Feat. Coogie	2020	—	—N/a	Find Your Light: Burn #2
"Daylight" Feat. HAON	2020	—	—N/a	Find Your Light: Daylight #3
"FYL" Feat. Golden	2020	—	—N/a	Find Your Light: FYL #4
"follow the light" Feat. Hoody	2021	—	—N/a	Find Your Light: Follow the Light #5
"By Your Color" (색대로 살아) Feat. Nucksal & Don Mills	2021	—	—N/a	Find Your Light: By Your Color #6
"Whistle" (색대로 살아) Feat. Sik-K and Mirani	2022	143	—N/a	Street Man Fighter
"Yes or No" Feat. Huh Yunjin and Crush	2024	32	—N/a	Non-album single
Collaborations
"Today" (오늘은) with Nell	2017	—	KOR: 21,054	Non-album single
"City Life" (도시생활) with Leellamarz	2019	132	—N/a	Room Service
"In My Room" with Leellamarz	2019	—	—N/a	Room Service
"Carabiner" (잡아줄게) feat. ASH ISLAND	2021	82	—N/a	Non-album singles
"Can't Slow Me Down" with Mirani, Lil Boi	2022	—	—N/a	Non-album singles
"—" denotes releases that did not chart.

=== Other charted songs ===
Title	Year	Peak chart positions	Sales (DL)	Album
Title	Year	KOR	Sales (DL)	Album
"Tell Me" feat. Sik-K, Giriboy	2017	—	KOR: 23,407	Everywhere
"Achoo Remix" GroovyRoom & Justhis feat. Mirani, pH-1, Munchman, Skinny Brown, Louie, Leellamarz, Ourealgoat, Dbo, Sik-K, Owen, Kid Milli, Swings, Nudeboi Seo, TRADE L, Coogie, Blase, sokodomo, Khundi Panda, Lil Moshpit & Khakii)	2021	109	—N/a	Salted Oyster (G+Jus)
"—" denotes releases that did not chart.

== Production discography ==
Artist	Album	Song(s)	Year
Olltii	Graduation	"96 Problems"; "Fallin'"; "Uneasy"; "Heat Wave"	2015
Bastarz	Conduct Zero	"Charlie Chaplin"; "Sue Me"	2015
Park Kyung	Notebook	"Ordinary Love"	2015
Cheetah	My Number	"My Number"	2015
Gary	2002	"Rap"; "Get Some Air"; "Halyang Dream"; "Shipapa"	2015
Jay Park	Worldwide	"Life"	2015
Dynamic Duo	Grand Carnival	"How You Doin'?"; "Title Song"	2015
Owen Ovadoz	P.O.E.M.	"Entertainer"; "M.O.N.E.Y. (Money Over Nature Eating Youth)"; "11 In Morning"	2016
Jay Park	The Truth Is	"The Truth Is"	2016
Babylon	Between Us	"Rainy Street"	2016
Dayday	Angel	"Angel"	2016
Jay Park	Scene Stealers	"Put Em' Up"	2016
DPR Live, Punchnello, Owen Ovadoz, Sik-K, Flowsik	Eung Freestyle	"Eung Freestyle"	2016
Sik-K	Flip	"Rendezvous"; "God Damn"; "Don't Play"; "Yellows Mobbin"	2016
Reddy	Ocean View	"Ocean View"	2016
Swings	Levitate 3	"Bowl's Difference 3"; "Black"	2016
Sik-K, Mac Kidd	Yelows Mob Presents	"Gang"	2016
Jay Park	Everything You Wanted	"I Got This"	2016
Bastarz	Welcome 2 Bastarz	"Selfish & Beautiful Girl"; "That's Right"	2016
Huckleberry P	Park Sang-hyuk	"Park Sang-hyuk"	2016
Andup	Sing Sung	"Hold Up"	2017
Double K	That Boi	"That Boi"	2017
Bill Stax	Buffet	"Baby"	2017
Mad Clown	Love is a Dog From Hell	"Love is a Dog From Hell"	2017
Dok2	Reborn	"Reborn"; "Ambition and Vision"; "Rollercoaster"; "Hiphop Lover"; "Plus 82"; "WTF (who the fuck)"; "Wattup"; "In My Whip"; "On & On"	2017
Gaeko	Gajah	"Gajah"	2017
Hyolyn & Changmo	Blue Moon	"Blue Moon"	2017
Minzy	Minzy Work 01: "Uno"	"Flashlight"	2017
Double K	Green Wave	"Surf"	2017
Double K	Business Man	"Business Man"	2017
Sik-K	Fly	"Fly"	2017
Sik-K	H.A.L.F (Have.A.Little.Fun)	"Party (Shut Down)"	2017
Heize	/// (You, Clouds, Rain)	"Don't Know You"; "Dark Clouds"	2017
Hyolyn & Kisum	Fruity	"Fruity"	2017
Jay Park & Dok2	Most Hated	"Most Hated"	2017
One	One Day	"Heyahe"	2017
Ja Mezz, Ness, Junoflo, Woodie Gochild	Show Me the Money 6	"Life Is A Gamble"	2017
Jeong Se-woon, Sik-K	Ever	"Just U"	2017
Owen Ovadoz	Problematic	"Open"	2017
Sik-K, PH-1, Jay Park	Dingo X H1GHR Music	"Iffy"	2017
Nafla	Angels	"Smile"	2017
Suran & Crush	Love Story	"Love Story"	2017
Rhythm Power	Dongseong-ro	"Dongseong-ro"	2017
Giriboy	Graduation	"Hikikomori"	2017
Younha	Rescue	"Hello"; "Parade"; "Like Nothing Happened"; "The Day I Did Not Find the Answer"	2017
SKY-HI x SALU	Say Hello To The Minions 2	"Goodbye To The System"	2019
Sik-K, pH-1, Woodie Gochild, Jay Park	Dingo X H1GHR MUSIC	"GIDDY UP"	2019
Eunha X Ravi	The Love of Spring	"Blossom (Prod. GroovyRoom)"	2019
OnlyOneOf	produced by [], pt.2	"a sOng Of ice&fire"	2020
Justhis	Show Me the Money 9	"G+Jus Freestyle"	2020
Mirani, MUNCHMAN, Khundi Panda & MUSHVENOM	Show Me the Money 9	"VVS (Feat. JUSTHIS)"	2020
Mirani	Show Me the Money 9	"Achoo (Feat. pH-1, HAON)"	2020
Khundi Panda	Show Me the Money 9	"The Roots (Feat. Justhis)"	2020
MUSHVENOM	Show Me the Money 9	"Tricker"	2020
Khundi Panda	Show Me the Money 9	"Hero (Feat. Justhis, Golden)"	2020
Mirani	Show Me the Money 9	"Part Time (Feat. Queen WA$ABII) (Prod. GroovyRoom, BOYCOLD)"	2020
MUSHVENOM	Show Me the Money 9	"Godok (Feat. SUPERBEE)"	2020
MUNCHMAN, Mckdaddy, Khakii & Ahn Byung-woong	Show Me the Money 9	"New New (Prod. GroovyRoom, MISU)"	2020
MUSHVENOM	Show Me the Money 9	"The Beauty of Void (Feat. Jessi, Justhis)"	2020
(G)I-dle	Digital single	"Last Dance"	2021
Justhis, Mushvenom	Salted Oyster (G+Jus)	"Take It"	2021
Justhis, pH-1, Big Naughty, TRADE L, Woodie Gochild, Jay Park & Kidd King	Salted Oyster (G+Jus)	"VVS (H1GHR Remix)" (Feat. Justhis)"	2021
Jay Park & pH-1	Digital single	"ALL IN"	2021

== Filmography ==
=== Television ===
Year	Program	Notes
2018	High School Rapper (season 2)	Judge/Producer
2019	High School Rapper (season 3)	Judge/Producer
2020	Show Me the Money 9	Judge/Producer
2022	Show Me the Money 11	Producer

== Awards and nominations ==
Awards Ceremony	Year	Category	Nominee/Work	Result	Ref.
Asian Pop Music Awards	2021	Best Arranger (Overseas)	"Last Dance"	Nominated	
Korean Hip-hop Awards	2017	Producer of the Year	Themselves	Won	
Korean Hip-hop Awards	2018	Artist of the Year	Themselves	Nominated	
Korean Hip-hop Awards	2018	Producer of the Year	Themselves	Won	
Korean Hip-hop Awards	2018	Collaboration of the Year	"Xindoshi"	Nominated	
Korean Hip-hop Awards	2021	Producer of the Year	Themselves	Nominated	
Soribada Best K-Music Awards	2019	Best Hip Hop Maker Award	Themselves	Won	
