= 2018 MBC Plus X Genie Music Awards =

South Korean music awards ceremony

- Date: November 6, 2018
- Location: Namdong Gymnasium, Incheon, South Korea
- Hosted by: Jun Hyun-moo
- Most awards: BTS (5)
- Website: event.genie.co.kr/promotion/mga

Television/radio coverage
- Network: MBC Plus; MBC Music; MBC Every1; V Live
- Runtime: 210 minutes

The 2018 MBC Plus X Genie Music Awards ceremony, organized by MBC Plus and Genie Music, took place on November 6, 2018, at Namdong Gymnasium in Incheon, South Korea. This is the first MGA ceremony.

BTS, Wanna One, and Twice took home the grand prizes, also known as the "Daesang Awards".

== Attendees, performers and presenters ==
Jun Hyun-moo hosted the show. Day6, Momoland, Chungha, Stray Kids, Heize, (G)I-DLE, Jung Seung-hwan are among the attendees of the show and won.

=== Performers ===
- Celeb Five and Akane Kikaku – "I Wanna Be a Celeb"
- Charlie Puth – "See You Again"
- BTS and Charlie Puth – "We Don't Talk Anymore" and "Fake Love"
- Generations from Exile Tribe – " F.L.Y BOYS F.L.Y GIRLS" and "AGEHA"
- Vibe, Ben, and 4Men's Kim Won-joo – "I Can't". "Love, ing" and "Please Come Back Again"
- Twice – "Heart Shaker", "What Is Love", "Dance the Night Away", and "Yes or Yes"
- Wanna One – "To Be One", "Nothing Without You", "I'll Remember", "Light" and "Beautiful"
- BTS – "Save Me", "I'm Fine" and "Idol"

=== Presenters ===
- Pyo Ye-jin
- Lee Ji-hoon
- Seol In-ah
- Yeo Hoe-hyun
- Moon Gabi
- BJ Banzz
- Fukushi Sota
- Kim Ho-young
- Kang Han-na
- Kim Kwon
- Jo Woo-ri
- Shin Ah-young
- Jo Hyun-jae
- Lee Hyun-yi

== Judging criteria ==
Division	Online Voting	Digital Sales	Judge Score	Social Media
Artist of the Year	30%	30%	20%	20%
Song of the Year	20%	40%	20%	20%
Best Selling Artist of the Year	10%	50%	20%	20%
Digital Album of the Year	10%	50%	20%	20%
Artist Category Awards*	30%	30%	20%	20%
Song Genre Awards**	20%	40%	20%	20%
Special Awards***	100%	–	–	–
*Male Artist Award, Female Artist Award, Male Group Award, Female Group Award, Male Rookie Award, Female Rookie Award, Discovery of the Year; **Dance Track (Male), Dance Track (Female), Vocal Track (Male), Vocal Track (Female), Rap/Hip Hop Music Award, Band Music Award, OST Award; ***Genie Music Popularity Award, Idolchamp Global Popularity Award

== Winners and nominees ==
Winners are listed first and highlighted in boldface. Voting took place on the Genie Music website from October 1, 2018, through October 31, 2018.

Artist of the Year (Daesang)	Song of the Year (Daesang)
**BTS**; Blackpink; BtoB; Celeb Five; Chungha; Dean; Fromis 9; (G)I-dle; HAON; Heize; iKon; Jang Deok Cheol; Jung Seung Hwan; KHAN; Kim Dong Han; Loona; Mamamoo; Momoland; Pentagon; Paul Kim; Red Velvet; Roy Kim; Seventeen; Seungri; Stray Kids; Sunmi; Suzy; Twice; Taeyeon; The Boyz; VINXEN; Wanna One; Yong Jun-hyung	**Wanna One – "Beautiful"**; BEN – "Can’t Go"; BEN – "Love, ing"; Blackpink – "Ddu-Du Ddu-Du"; BtoB – "Missing You"; BTS – "Fake Love"; BTS – "Idol"; Bolbbalgan4 – "Travel"; Day6 – "Shoot Me"; Davichi – "Days Without You"; Epik High – "Love Story" (Feat. IU); F.T. Island – "Summer Night’s Dream"; Hyukoh – "Love Ya!"; Heize – "Jenga" (Feat. Gaeko); iKon – "Love Scenario"; ISU (M.C THE MAX) – "My Way"; Jang Deok Cheol – "Good Old Days"; Jaurim – "For Ever and Ever"; Mamamoo – "Rainy Season"; Mamamoo – "Starry Night"; Momoland – "Bboom Bboom"; MeloMance – "Deepen"; MeloMance – "Tale"; NELL, GroovyRoom – "Today"; Pentagon – "Shine"; Paul Kim – "Every Day, Every Moment"; Red Velvet – "Power Up"; Roy Kim – "Only Then"; Seventeen – "Oh My!"; Shinee – "Good Evening"; Sondia – "Adult"; Twice – "What is Love?"; Winner – "Everyday"; Wanna One – "Boomerang"; Yong Jun-hyung – "Sudden Shower" (Feat. 10 cm)
Best Selling Artist of the Year (Daesang)	Digital Album of the Year (Daesang)
**Twice**; Bolbbalgan4; BTS; MeloMance; Red Velvet	**BTS – Love Yourself: Answer**; Bolbbalgan4 – Red Diary Page.2; Epik High – We've Done Something Wonderful; iKon – Return; Wanna One – 1-1=0 (Nothing Without You)
Best Male Group	Best Female Group
**BTS**; BtoB; iKon; Seventeen; Wanna One	**Twice**; Red Velvet; Mamamoo; Momoland; Blackpink
Male Rookie Group	Female Rookie Group
**Stray Kids**; HAON; Kim Dong Han; The Boyz; VINXEN	**(G)I-dle**; Celeb Five; Fromis 9; Loona; KHAN
Best Male Solo Artist	Best Female Solo Artist
**Jung Seung-hwan**; Dean; Roy Kim; Seungri; Yong Jun-hyung	**Chungha**; Heize; Sunmi; Suzy; Taeyeon
Discovery of the Year	Rap/HipHop Music Award
**Celeb Five**; Jang Deok Cheol; Momoland; Paul Kim; Pentagon	**iKon – "Love Scenario"**; BTS – "Fake Love"; Epik High – "Love Story" (Feat. IU); Winner – "Everyday"; Yong Jun-hyung – "Sudden Shower" (Feat. 10 cm)
Best Band Performance Award	Best OST Award
**Day6 – "Shoot Me"**; F.T. Island – "Summer Night’s Dream"; Hyukoh – "Love Ya!"; Jaurim – "For Ever and Ever"; NELL, GroovyRoom – "Today"	**Paul Kim – "Every Day, Every Moment"**; BEN – "Can't Go"; ISU (M.C THE MAX) – "My Way"; MeloMance – "Deepen"; Sondia – "Adult"
Best Male Dance Performance	Best Female Dance Performance
**BTS – "Idol"**; Pentagon – "Shine"; Seventeen – "Oh My!"; Shinee – "Good Evening"; Wanna One – "Boomerang"	**Momoland– "Bboom Bboom"**; Blackpink – "Ddu-Du Ddu-Du"; Mamamoo – "Starry Night"; Red Velvet – "Power Up"; Twice – "What is Love?
Best Male Vocal Performance	Best Female Vocal Performance
**Wanna One – "Beautiful"**; BtoB – "Missing You"; Jang Deok Cheol – "Good Old Days"; MeloMance – "Tale"; Roy Kim – "Only Then"	**Heize – "Jenga" (Feat. Gaeko)**; Ben – "Love, ing"; Bolbbalgan4 – "Travel"; Davichi – "Days Without You"; Mamamoo – "Rainy Season"
Best Rap/Hip Hop Award	Genie Music Popularity Award
**iKon – "Love Scenario"**; BTS – "Fake Love"; Epik High – "Love Story" (feat. IU); Winner – "Everyday"; Yong Jun-hyung – "Sudden Shower" (Feat. 10 cm)	**BTS**; List of nominated artists: Ben; Blackpink; Bolbbalgan4; BtoB; Celeb Five; Chungha; Day6; Davichi; Dean; Epik High; Fromis 9; F.T. Island; (G)I-dle; HAON; Heize; Hyukoh; iKon; ISU (M.C THE MAX); Jang Deok Cheol; Jaurim; Jung Seung Hwan; KHAN; Kim Dong Han; Loona; Mamamoo; MeloMance; Momoland; NELL and GroovyRoom; Pentagon; Paul Kim; Red Velvet; Roy Kim; Seventeen; Seungri; Shinee; Sondia; Stray Kids; Sunmi; Suzy; Twice; Taeyeon; The Boyz; VINXEN; Wanna One; Winner; Yong Junhyung

Other awards

- MBC Plus Star Award – Wanna One
- Best Global Performance – Twice
- Best Producer – Bang Si-hyuk
- Best Pop Artist – Charlie Puth
- MGA Best Choreographer – Son Sung-deuk (BTS' Idol)
