= High School Rapper =

South Korean music competition television series

- Also known as: School Rapper
- Hangul: 고등래퍼
- RR: Godeungnaepeo
- MR: Kodŭngnaep'ŏ
- Presented by: Jeong Jun-ha, Haha (season 1); Nucksal (season 2-4)
- Country of origin: South Korea
- Original language: Korean
- No. of seasons: 4

Production
- Running time: 70–100 minutes

Original release
- Network: Mnet
- Release: 2017 – present

Related
- Show Me the Money; Unpretty Rapstar

High School Rapper (Korean: 고등래퍼) is a South Korean survival hip-hop TV show, known as a students of high school counterpart of Show Me The Money and Unpretty Rapstar.

== About ==
A hip-hop league tailored for students is available at free of admission. It's showcased on the Korean television music channel, "MNET," which stands for Music Network. The program debuted on MNET at 11 PM starting from February 10 to March 31, 2017. Each season comprises 8 episodes. The most recent Season 4 attracted 12,000 applicants nationwide, featuring a notable lineup of producers serving as mentors to evaluate and guide the contestants.

== Structure ==
An audition program focusing on hip-hop. The program announces its application date through social media channels, and applicants are required to submit their auditions via YouTube videos, showcasing their rap skills online.

=== Stage 1: Preliminary Round ===
High school students from each of the six regional areas participate in solo performances. Mentors score each performance, determining whether the student advances or is eliminated. Students are expected to memorize their lyrics, perform without mistakes, and deliver their best performance.

=== Stage 2: Cypher Battle ===
Students who receive similar scores engage in cypher battles, competing against students from other regional schools of the same grade level (e.g., freshmen versus freshmen). Participants perform under randomly selected beats, improvising lyrics for their rap.

=== Stage 3: 1 vs 1 ===
Students engage in one-on-one rap battles. Mentors determine the winner, and the loser is eliminated from the competition.

=== Final ===
Remaining students collaborate on a performance using a beat provided by the mentor. Students also have the option to feature another performer of their choice, provided both parties agree.

== Seasons ==
=== Season 1 (2017) ===
Mentors

Name	Note(s)
Mad Clown	For contestants from Gangdong District, Seoul Record Label: Soul Company, Starship Entertainment, Sameside Company
Giriboy	For contestants from Gangseo District, Seoul Record Label: I4P (CEO), Standard Friends, Wedaplugg Records, BuckWild, Do'main, Truck so big, WYBH
Xitsuh	For contestants from the east sides of Gyeonggi Province and Incheon Record Label: K-Tigers E&C, DR Music, ISIT
Swings	For contestants from the west sides of Gyeonggi Province and Incheon Record Label: JUST MUSIC (CEO), Indigo (CEO), WEDAPLUGG RECORDS (CEO), Mine Field (CEO), P NATION (CEO), OVERCLASS
Jessi	For contestants from Gwangju, North Jeolla Province and South Jeolla Province Record Label: YMC Entertainment, P NATION, MORE VISION
YDG aka. (YDG) 梁東根	For contestants from Gwangju, North Jeolla Province and South Jeolla Province Record Label: JOE Entertainment
Deepflow aka. (639) POLA SNOW	For contestants from Busan, North Gyeongsang Province and South Gyeongsang Province Record Label: Big Deal Records, Big Deal Squads, Vismajor Company, JiggyFellaz, Vismajor Crew, The Bold Crew (서리), 119
Tiger JK aka. DRUKKEN TIGER	Special judge for the Finals Record Label: FEELGHOOD Music CREW: DRUNKEN TIGER, MFBTY

Finalists

Rank	Name	Rapper Name
1st	Yang Hong-won	Young B
2nd	Choi Ha-min	Osshun Gum
3rd	Jo Won-woo	H2ADIN
4th	Kim Sun-jae	snzae
5th	Lee Dong-min	Ice Puff
6th	Kim Kyu-heon	hunnyhunna
7th	Mark (NCT)	—N/a

WINNER: YOUNG B

Young B (양홍원), born on January 12, 1999, attended Munjeong High School and secured the first title in season 1 of High School Rapper. He is affiliated with Indigo Music, owned by Swings (also known as Moon Swings) and D.O.G Entertainment label. Young B gained recognition after debuting in 2015 on SHOW ME THE MONEY 4. He is a member of the hip-hop crew DiCKIDS, composed of high school students, which enjoys widespread popularity among Korean schools. One of his notable singles is "In the Morning," contributing to his ongoing prominence in the Korean hip-hop scene.

=== Season 2 (2018) ===
Mentors

Name(s)
GroovyRoom
Rhythm Power (Hangzoo, Boi B)
San E, Cheetah
Deepflow

Finalists

Rank	Name	Rapper Name
1st	Kim Ha-on	Haon
2nd	Lee Byeong-jae	Vinxen
3rd	Lee Yeon-seo/Lee Ro-han	Webster B/Rohann
4th	Yoon Jin-young	Clloud/Ash Island
5th	Jo Won-woo	H2ADIN

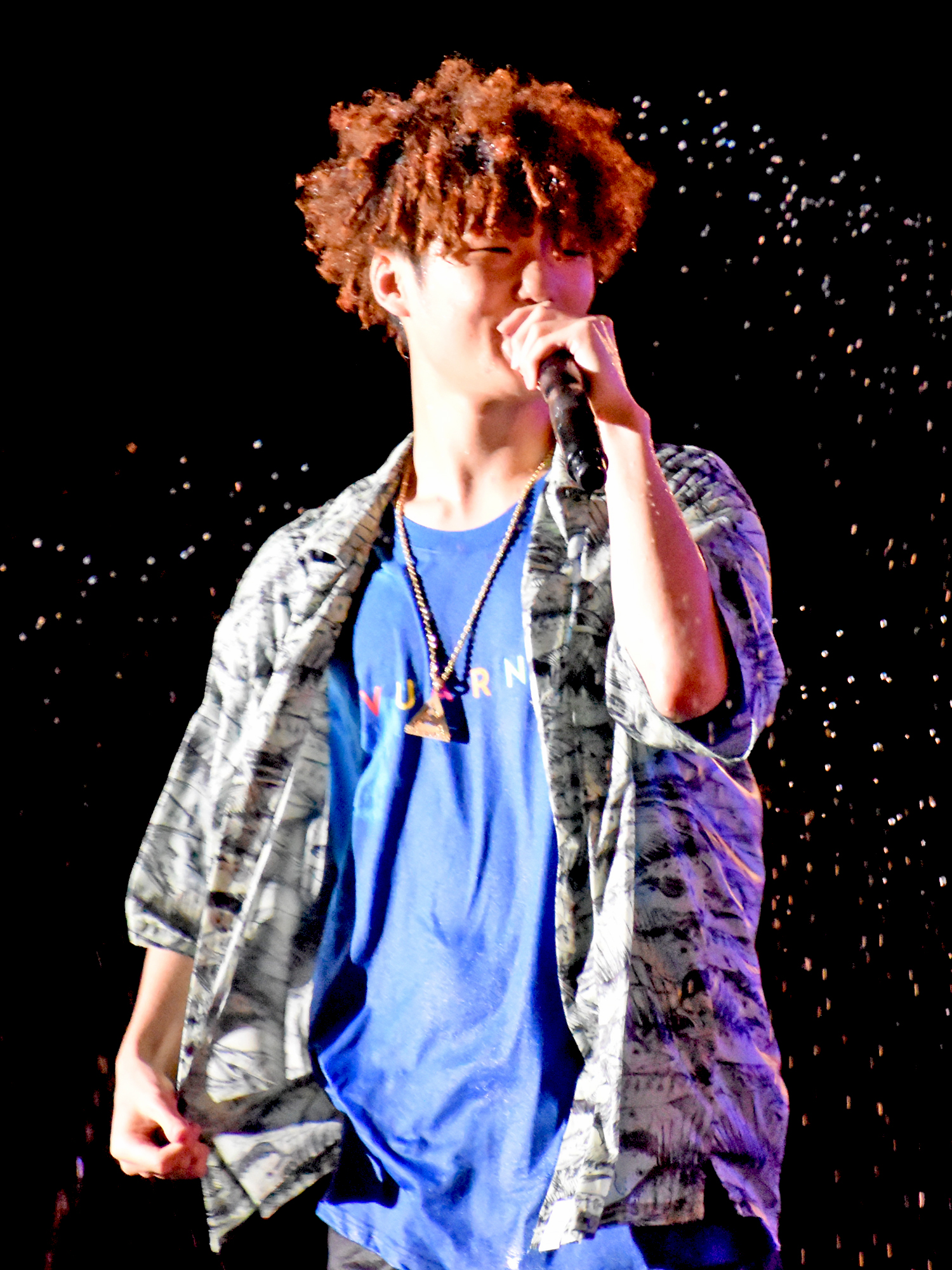
HAON (김하온)

WINNER: HAON

HAON (김하온), born on July 7, 2000, attended Pangok High School. He is associated with the KC entertainment label, owned by Sik-K (권민식). HAON made his debut in 2018 with the single 'LOVE! DANCE!'. He is well-regarded for his distinctive pronunciation, voice, and flow, which have garnered widespread public appeal. His notable strengths lie in his lyric writing and rapping abilities, and he is known to have an interest in meditation.

=== Season 3 (2019) ===
Mentors

Name(s)
Giriboy, Kid Milli
Rhythm Power (Hangzoo, Boi B)
The Quiett, Code Kunst
GroovyRoom

Finalists

Rank	Name	Rapper Name
1st	Lee Young-ji	—N/a
2nd	Kang Min-soo	AQUINAS
3rd	Choi Jin-ho	BlueWhale
4th	Lee Jin-woo	$IGA A
5th	Kwon Young-hoon	TANGTHEAWESOME
6th	Yang Seung-ho	Sokodomo

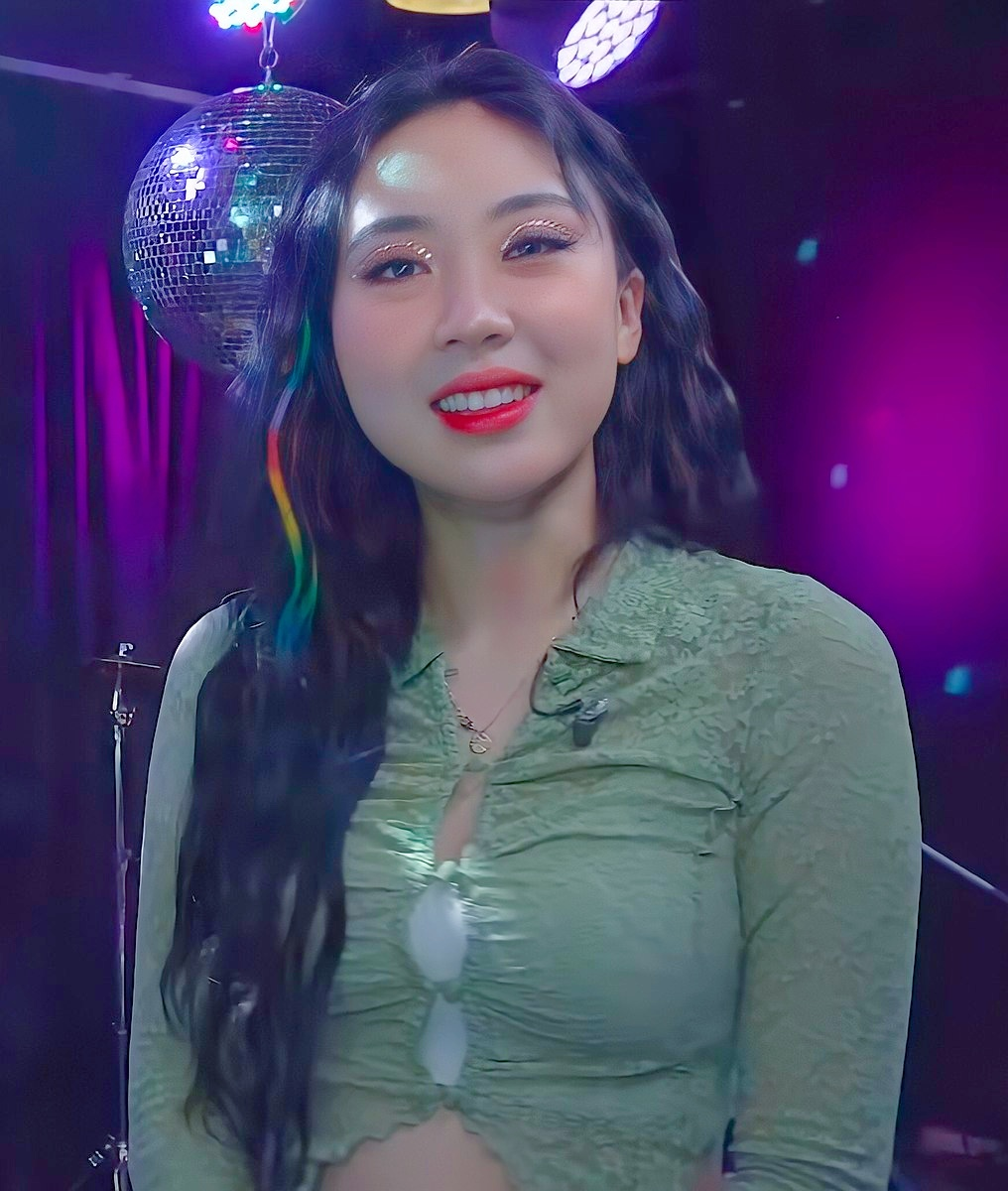
YOUNG JI (이영지)

WINNER: LEE YOUNG JI

LEE YOUNG JI (이영지), born on September 10, 2002, attended Sinseo High School. She is affiliated with the MAINSTREAM label. Young Ji made her debut in 2019 with the single "Dark Room" (암실). She achieved victory in both High School Rapper season 3 and SHOW ME THE MONEY season 11. Known by the nickname "K-CULTURE PRESIDENT," Young Ji is recognized for her humor and has appeared in numerous entertainment programs, including Running Man and "차린건 쥐뿔도 없지만" on YouTube. She is renowned for her unique, low-toned voice, which is distinct within the Korean hip-hop culture.

=== Season 4 (2021) ===
Mentors

Team	Mentors
Daytona Entertainment	The Quiett, Yumdda
H1ghr Music	Jay Park, pH-1, Woogie
AOMG	Simon Dominic, Loco
Ambition Musik	Changmo, Way Ched

Finalists

Rank	Name	Rapper Name
1st	Lee Seung-hoon	Trade L
2nd	Noh Yoon-ha	JAM1E
3rd	Kim Woo-rim	D.Ark
4th	Park Hyeon-jin	—N/a
5th	Lee Sang-jae	Lil Nekh/Touch the Sky

WINNER: TRADE L

LEE SEUNG HOON (이승훈), born on July 21, 2004, attended Kwonsun High School. He is associated with H1GHR MUSIC, owned by J PARK. Trade L debuted in 2019 and is recognized for his strong rapping skills. While his rapping style is still evolving, Trade L is known for his focus on R&B-based and melodic music.
