= High School Rapper season 2 =

2018 South Korean survival TV show

High School Rapper
- Season 2
- Native name
- Hangul: 고등래퍼 2
- RR: Godeungnaepeo 2
- MR: Kodŭngnaep'ŏ 2
- No. of episodes: 8

Release
- Original network: Mnet
- Original release: February 23 – April 13, 2018

Season chronology
- ← Previous; Season 1 Next → Season 3

The second season of High School Rapper (Korean: 고등래퍼 2) is a 2018 South Korean survival hip hop TV show. It aired on Mnet starting February 23 to April 13, 2018. Kim Ha-on won, Bae Yeon-seo came in second and Lee Byung-jae placed third in the final ranking.

== Season overview ==
=== Mentors ===
- GroovyRoom
- Hangzoo x Boi B
- San E x Cheetah
- Deepflow

== Contestants ==
Pre 1 grade	1 grade	2 grade	3 grade
Lee Ye-chan	Park Jin-oh	Kim Ha-on	Yoon Jin-young
Ha Seon-ho	Seok Min	Bang Yeon-seo	Kim Yoon-ho
Kim Min-seok	Lee Min-woo	Lee Byung-jae	Bang Jae-min
Park Ji-won	Kim Hyo-dong	Jo Won-woo	Park Joon-ho
	Ji Min-hyuk	Yoon Byung-ho	Oh Dam-ryul
	Kim Joon-seo	Kim Geun-soo	Hwiyoung
	Kim Eun-ji	Lee Seung-hwa	Park Young-seo
	Alice	Lee Ji-eun	Kim Sae-ryung
		Song Jae-hoon	Bin Ha-neul
		Kim Sung-ho	
		Jo Eun-san	

== Episodes ==
=== Ep. 1-2: Cypher ===
On the first episode of the show, 32 high school students handpicked by the show's producers among 8,000 applicants met each other the first time. Students in the same grade had to compete each other with freestyle rap, and the other grades got to vote on the best rapper among that grade. Then, the students voted first place in their respective grades were given the opportunity to take turns and choose their own teammates.

Lee Ye-chan team	Seok Min team	Kim Ha-on team	Kim Yoon-ho team
Lee Ye-chan	Seok Min	Kim Ha-on	Kim Yoon-ho
Yoon Byung-ho	Bae Yeon-seo	Lee Byung-jae	Jo Won-woo
Kim Se-ryung	Oh Dam-ryul	Ha Seon-ho	Bang Jae-min
Ji Min-hyuk	Yoon Jin-young	Go Jun-seo	Kim Hyo-dong
Lee Ji-eun	Song Jae-hoon	Jo Eun-san	Kim Geun-soo
Alice	Lee Seung-hwa	Park Joon-ho	Bin Ha-neul
Kim Eun-ji	Kim Seong-ho	Hwi-young	Park Ji-won
Park Jin-oh	Park Young-seo	Kim Min-seok	Lee Min-woo

=== Ep. 2-3: Team Finalization - Your Personal Story ===
Among eight teammates in each team determined from last competition, only top four, decided by the producers after watching their performance with lyrics about their personal stories, were allowed to advance to the next round. Four teams of producers each were allowed to give maximum 50 points to each student, allowing for maximum 200 points per student.

Lee Ye-chan team
Place	Student	Score	%
1	Yoon Byung-ho	171	85.5
2	Lee Ye-chan	157	78.5
3	Park Jin-oh	141	70.5
4	Lee Ji-eun	121	60.5
5	Kim Se-ryung	116	58.0
6	Ji Min-hyuk	115	57.5
-	Kim Eun-ji	-	-
-	Alice	-	-

Results for students Kim Eun-ji and Alice weren't disclosed. Afterwards, Deepflow became the team's mentor.

Seok Min team
Place	Students	Score	%
1	Bae Yeon-seo	184	92.0
2	Oh Dam-ryul	176	88.0
3	Yoon Jin-young	173	86.5
4	Lee Seung-hwa	154	77.0
5	Song Jae-hoon	151	75.5
6	Kim Seong-ho	142	71.0
7	Park Young-seo	141	70.5
8	Seok Min	131	65.5

Afterwards, the team chose Hangzoo and Boi B as their mentors.

Kim Ha-on team
Place	Students	Score	%
1	Kim Haon	191	95.5
2	Lee Byung-jae	180	90.0
3	Ha Seon-ho	162	81.0
4	Park Joon-ho	159	79.5
5	Hwi-young	154	77.0
6	Kim Min-seok	153	76.5
7	Jo Eun-san	128	64.0
8	Go Jun-seo	63	31.5

Afterwards, Groovy Room was chosen as the team's mentors.

Kim Yoon-ho team
Place	Students	Score	%
1	Jo Won-woo	178	89.0
2	Kim Geun-soo	176	88.0
3	Kim Yoon-ho	160	80.0
4	Bang Jae-min	152	76.0
5	Lee Min-woo	151	75.5
6	Kim Hyo-dong	148	74.0
7	Park Ji-won	133	66.5
-	Bin Ha-neul	-	-

Bin Ha-neul's results weren't disclosed. Afterwards, the team chose San E and Cheetah for their mentors.

=== Ep. 4-5: Team Battle - Textbook Literature ===
Students had to choose either a poetry or novel piece of their choice and write a song about it. Each team, consisting of 4 members, were divided into two groups of two, and competed with other groups. For groups that lost, only one of them were allowed to pass and the other one disqualified.

100 maximum
Categories		Mentor	Group		Song	Point
Poem	VS	San E, Cheetah	Jo Won-woo	Kim Geun-soo	Cast Away the Useless	59
Poem	VS	Hangzoo, Boi B	Yoon Jin-young	Lee Seung-hwa	Wavering Flower	41
Poem	VS	Hangzoo, Boi B	Bae Yeon-seo	Oh Dam-ryul	Buk	85
Poem	VS	Groovy Room	Lee Byung-jae	Ha Seon-ho	By Burning Thirst	15
Novel	VS	Groovy Room	Kim Ha-on	Park Joon-ho	The Little Prince	79
Novel	VS	Deepflow	Yoon Byung-ho	Park Jin-oh	Wan-deuk	21
Novel	VS	San E, Cheetah	Kim Yoon-ho	Bang Jae-min	Oseong and Haneum	81
Novel	VS	Deepflow	Lee Ye-chan	Lee Ji-eun	Camellia Blossoms	19

Disqualified: Lee Seung-hwa, Ha Seon-ho, Park Jin-oh, and Lee Ji-eun.

All else passed.

=== Ep. 5-6: Team Battle - Collaboration with Mentors ===
Students competed in two groups, one group where mentors and students performed together, and the other where students performed with the beat produced by their mentors. Students that failed to get in top three were disallowed from advancing to the next round.

Group 1: Perform With Mentors 200 maximum from guest judges; 300 maximum from audience; 500 maximum total
Mentor	Student(s)	Guest Judges	%	Audience	%	Total	%
Deepflow	Yoon byung-ho	176	88.0	262	87.3	438	87.6
Groovy Room	Park Joon-ho	161	80.5	242	80.7	403	80.6
San E, Cheetah	Bang Jae-min, Kim Geun-soo	124	62.0	272	90.7	396	79.2
Hangzoo, Boi B	Oh Dam-ryul	121	60.5	234	78.0	355	71.0

Oh Dam-ryul failed to get in the top three.

Group 2: Perform On Mentor's Beat 200 maximum from guest judges; 300 maximum from audience; 500 maximum total
Mentor	Student(s)	Guest Judges	%	Audience	%	Total	%
Groovy Room	Kim Ha-on, Lee Byung-jae	190	95.0	281	93.7	471	94.2
Hangzoo, Boi B	Bae Yeon-seo, Yoon Jin-young	170	85.0	294	98.0	464	92.8
San E, Cheetah	Jo Won-woo, Kim Yoon-ho	156	78.0	266	88.7	422	84.4
Deepflow	Lee Ye-chan	154	77.0	218	72.7	372	74.4

Lee Ye-chan failed to pass to the next round.

=== Ep. 7: Semi-Final ===
Of 10 students left in the race, only 5 were allowed to advance to the finals, determined by the audience vote after watching everyone's performance.

500 maximum
Place	Mentor	Student	Points	%
1	Groovy Room	Kim Ha-on	474	94.6
2	Groovy Room	Lee Byung-jae	468	93.6
3	San E, Cheetah	Jo Won-woo	436	87.2
4	Hangzoo, Boi B	Bae Yeon-seo	424	84.8
5	Hangzoo, Boi B	Yoon Jin-young	402	80.4
6	Deepflow	Yoon Byung-ho	396	79.2
7	San E, Cheetah	Kim Yoon-ho	340	68.0
8	San E, Cheetah	Bang Jae-min	332	66.4
9	Groovy Room	Park Joon-ho	298	59.6
10	San E, Cheetah	Kim Geun-soo	264	52.8

=== Ep. 8: Final ===
The audience of 500 voted on the students once during each performance, and once after every performance was over. On the first round of voting, cast during the performance, one voter could cast his or her vote to however many students, so every student could earn 500 maximum points. On the second round, cast after the performances, one voter could only vote on one member.

Kim Ha-on became the champion.

		1st Round	%	2nd Round	%	Total
1	Kim Ha-on	445	89.0	134	26.8	579
2	Bae Yeon-seo	447	89.4	125	25.0	572
3	Lee Byung-jae	443	88.6	91	18.2	534
4	Yoon Jin-young	379	75.8	105	21.0	484
5	Jo Won-woo	377	75.4	45	9.0	422

== Ratings ==
Average TV viewership ratings
Ep.	Original broadcast date	Average audience share
Ep.	Original broadcast date	Nielsen Korea (Nationwide)
1	February 23, 2018	1.025% (18th)
2	March 2, 2018	1.117% (12th)
3	March 9, 2018	1.423% (24th)
4	March 16, 2018	1.019% (30th)
5	March 23, 2018	1.041% (29th)
6	March 30, 2018	1.18% (12th)
7	April 7, 2018	1.276% (13th)
8	April 13, 2018	1.536% (5th)
In the table above, the blue numbers represent the lowest ratings and the red numbers represent the highest ratings.
