= Haon (rapper) =

South Korean rapper

- 김하온
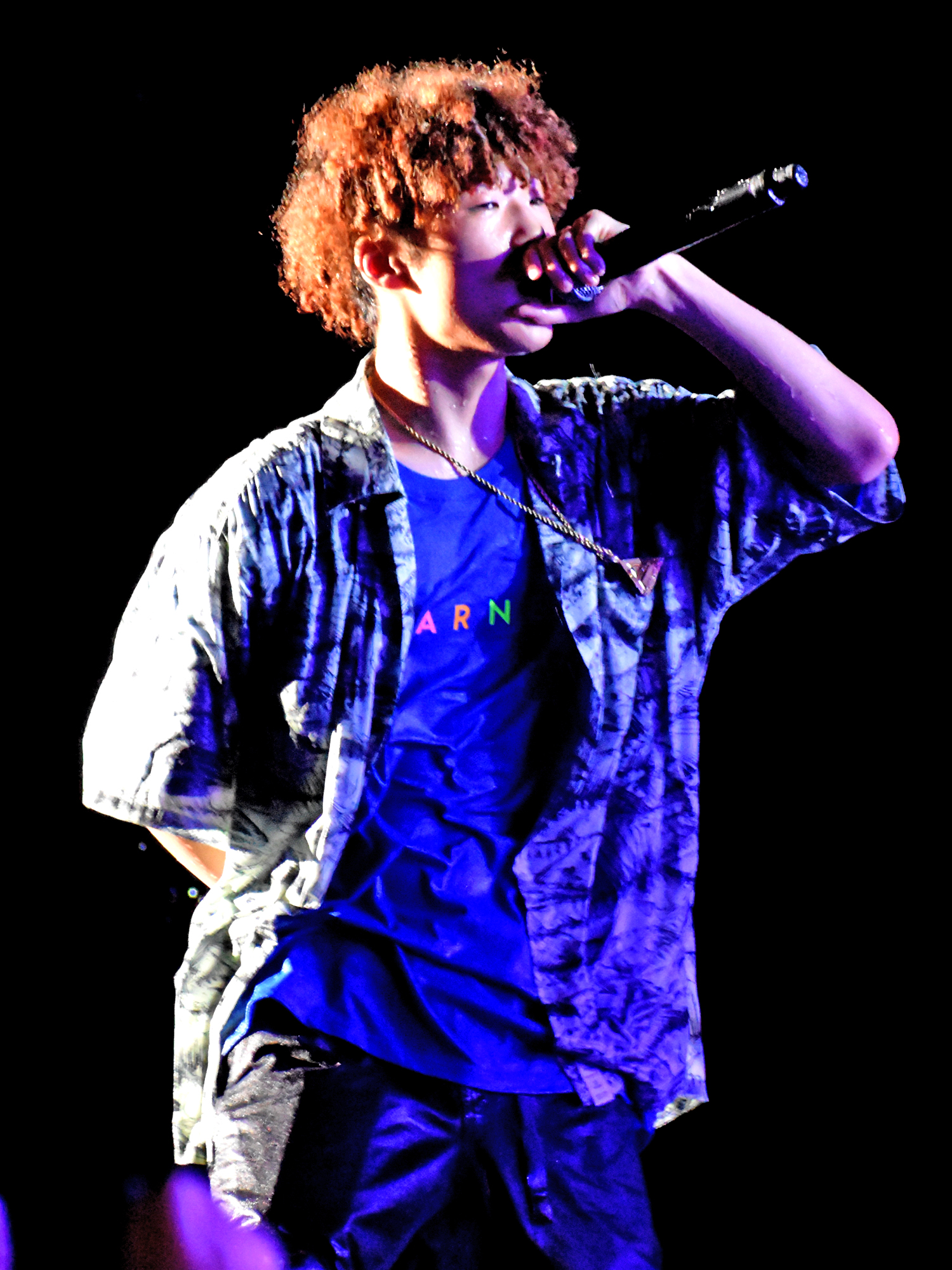
- Haon performing at the Busan Sea Festival, August 2018
- Born: Kim Ha-on; July 7, 2000 (age 26); Seoul, South Korea
- Occupation: Rapper
- Musical career
- Genre: Hip hop
- Instrument: Vocals
- Years active: 2018–present
- Labels: H1ghr Music; KC

Korean name
- Hangul: 김하온
- RR: Gim Haon
- MR: Kim Haon

Kim Ha-on (Korean: 김하온; born July 7, 2000), better known mononymously as Haon, is a South Korean rapper. He is the winner of High School Rapper 2 and Show me the money 12. He appeared as a contestant on both High School Rapper 1 and High School Rapper 2. He released his first EP, Travel: Noah, on September 5, 2018.

== Career ==
=== Debut ===
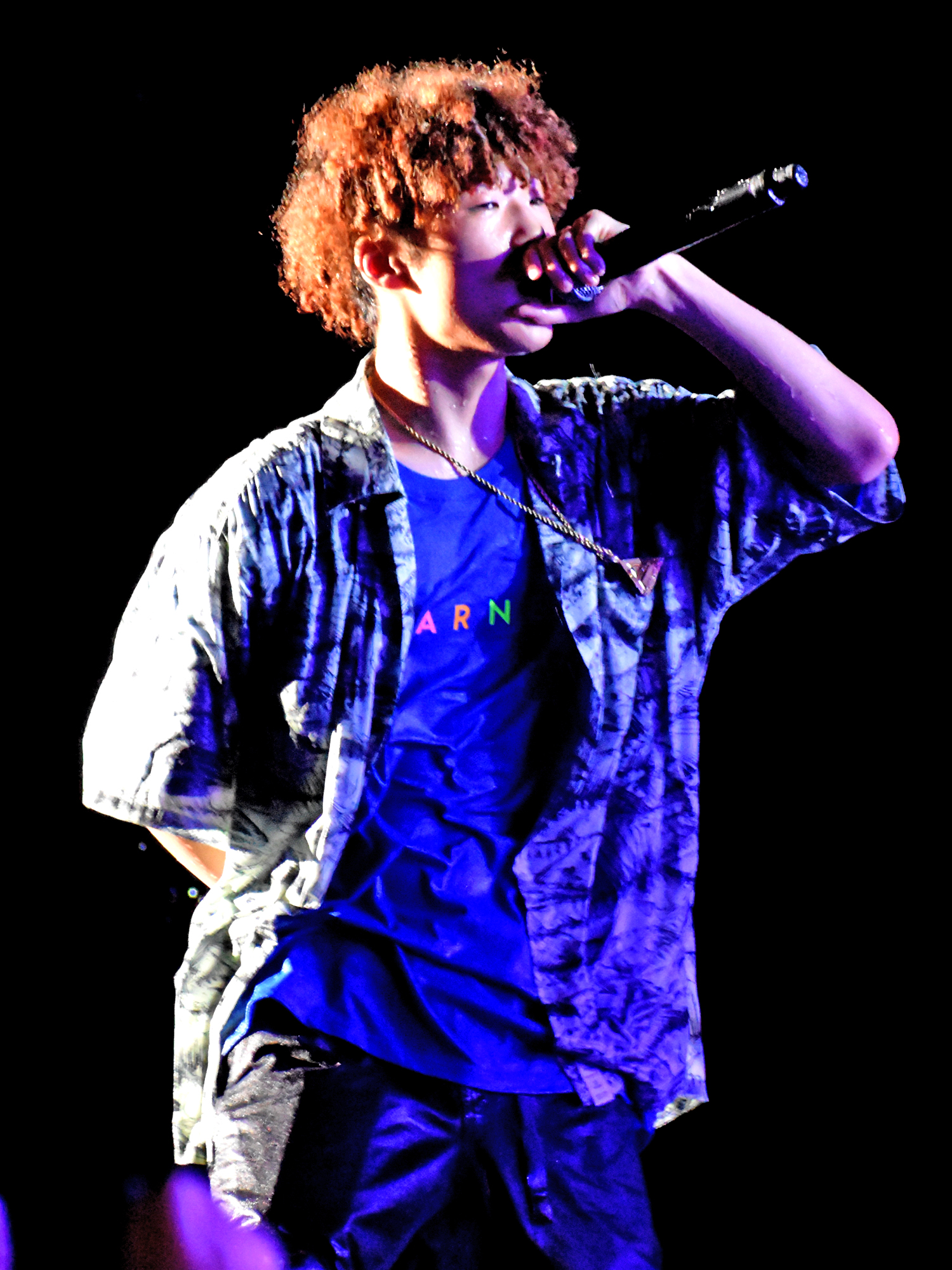
Haon at the 23rd Busan Sea Festival in Haeundae on August 1, 2018

In 2018, Haon participated in Mnet's reality show, High School Rapper 2 and finished in 1st placed overall. He released his first EP on September 5, 2018, titled Travel: Noah.

== Discography ==
=== Studio albums ===
Title	Album details	Peak chart positions	Sales
Title	Album details	KOR	Sales
Haonoah	Released: March 29, 2024; Label: KC, Warner Music; Formats: CD, digital download	83	KOR: 864

=== Extended plays ===
Title	EP details	Peak chart positions	Sales
Title	EP details	KOR	Sales
Travel: Noah	Released: September 5, 2018; Label: H1ghr Music, Genie Music; Formats: CD, digital download	21	KOR: 2,167

=== Singles ===
Title	Year	Peak chart positions	Album
Title	Year	KOR	Album
As lead artist
"Adios"	2018	26	High School Rapper 2
"Boong-Boong" (붕붕) feat. Sik-K	2018	3	High School Rapper 2
"Graduation" feat. Vinxen and Webster B	2018	87	High School Rapper 2
"Love! Dance!"	2018	—	Non-album single
"Noah" feat. Jay Park and Hoody	2018	19	Travel: Noah
"Flower" (꽃)	2019	108	Non-album singles
"BwB"	2019	170	Non-album singles
"Skrr" (featuring Giselle)	2024	88	Non-album singles
Collaborations
"The Little Prince" (어린 왕자) with Pullik	2018	8	High School Rapper 2
"Bar Code" (바코드) with Vinxen	2018	1	High School Rapper 2
"Kitkat" with Woodie Gochild, Sik-K, and pH-1	2018	—	Non-album singles
"Gang Official Remix" with Sik-K, pH-1, and Jay Park	2020	4	Non-album singles
"Tick Tock" with Nosun, Raf Sandou, Marv, and Jung Jun-hyuk	2026	6	Show Me the Money 12 Episode 1
As featured artist
"Youth!" with Coogie and Bewhy	2019	—	Post Youth
"Empty" (텅) (Vinxen feat. Haon)	2019	—	Non-album single
"—" denotes releases that did not chart.

== Filmography ==
=== Television shows ===
Year	Title	Network	Notes
2017	High School Rapper 1	Mnet	Contestant
2017	Show Me the Money 6	Mnet	Feature
2018	High School Rapper 2	Mnet	Contestant; Finished 1st
2018	The Kkondae Live	Mnet	Cast member
2018–2019	Kids These Days	JTBC	Cast member
2019–2020	Rewind	Channel A	Team member
2024	Rap:Public	Mnet	Contestant
2026	Show Me the Money 12	Mnet	Finished 1st

== Awards and nominations ==
Year	Award	Category	Nominated work	Result	Ref.
2018	MBC Plus X Genie Music Awards	Artist of the Year	—N/a	Nominated	
2018	MBC Plus X Genie Music Awards	Genie Music Popularity Award	—N/a	Nominated	
2018	Melon Music Awards	Top 10 Artist	—N/a	Nominated	
2018	Mnet Asian Music Awards	Best New Male Artist	—N/a	Nominated	
2019	Korean Hip-hop Awards	Best New Artist	—N/a	Won	
