= Heize discography =

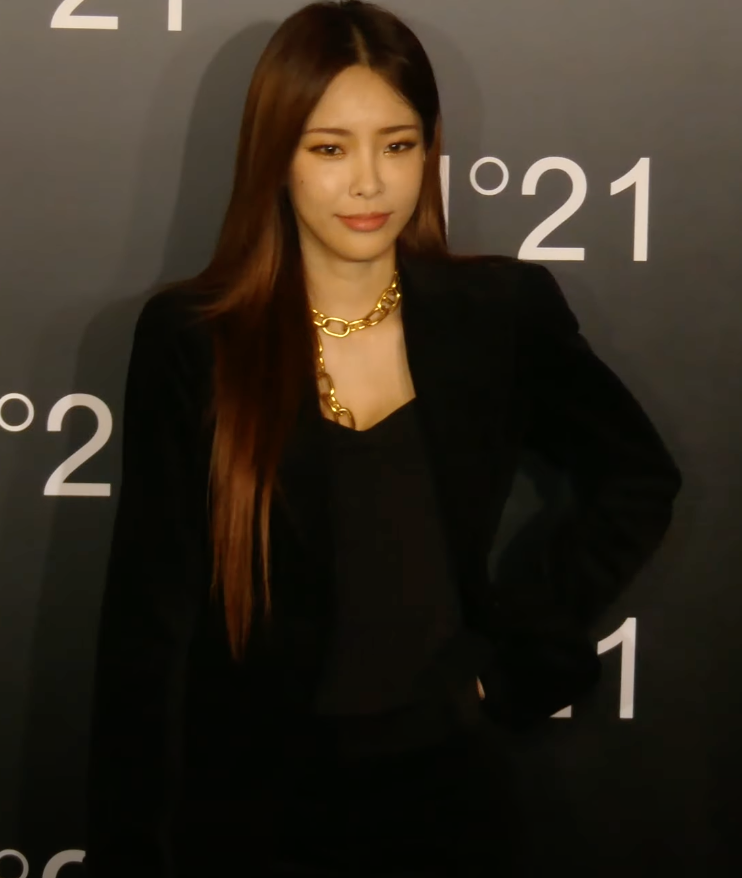
- Heize in 2019
- Studio albums: 2
- EPs: 7
- Singles: 30
- Music videos: 19

South Korean singer and rapper Heize has released two studio albums, seven extended plays (EP), 30 singles—including eight soundtrack appearances—and 19 music videos. Heize's earliest known musical appearance was a rap feature on the November 2013 single "Chilin'" by fellow South Korean rapper Crucial Star from his mixtape Drawing #2: A Better Man (2013). She released her eponymous debut hip-hop EP Heize through NHN Entertainment in March 2014. The album was promoted by the singles "After I've Wandered A Bit" featuring Crucial Star, and "Even the Little Club".

== Studio albums ==
List of studio albums, with selected details, chart positions, and sales
Title	Album details	Peak chart position	Sales
Title	Album details	KOR	Sales
She's Fine	Released: March 19, 2019; Label: Stone Music Entertainment, Studio Blu; Formats: CD, digital download; Track list: 1. "Her Fine Weather"; 2. "So, It Ends?" (그러니까) (featuring Colde); 3. "No Reason" (이유); 4. "Dispatch" (featuring Simon Dominic); 5. "Hitch Hiding" (숨고 싶어요) (with Sunwoo Jung-a); 6. "But, I Am Your Buddy" (featuring Davii); 7. "Umbrella Calls for Rain" (문득 그런 생각이 들어) (featuring Nafla); 8. "Tree Only Look at You" (너의 나무) (featuring Jooyoung); 9. "Doobling (Knock Sir)"; 10. "E.T"; 11. "E.T's Letter" (숨겨둔 편지) (Empty ver.)	18	KOR: 3,090
Undo	Released: June 30, 2022; Label: P Nation; Formats: CD, digital download; Track list: 1. "Undo" (없었던 일로); 2. "Sad Ending" (어쩌면 우리) (Feat. George); 3. "I Don't Lie" (Feat. Giriboy); 4. "Thief" (도둑놈) (Feat. Minnie of (G)I-dle); 5. "Distance" (거리마다) (Feat. I.M of Monsta X); 6. "Love is Alone" (Love is 홀로); 7. "Real Love" (널 만나고); 8. "Supercar" (슈퍼카); 9. "Traveler" (여행자); 10. "About Time"	31	KOR: 1,100

== Extended plays ==
List of extended plays, with selected details, chart positions, and sales
Title	EP details	Peak chart positions		Sales
Title	EP details	KOR	US World	Sales
Heize	Released: March 21, 2014; Label: NHN Entertainment; Formats: CD, digital download; Track list: 1. "Maktoob"; 2. "Even the Little Club" (클럽이라도 좀 가); 3. "I Know" (알고 있어); 4. "After I've Wandered a Bit" (조금만 더 방황 하고) (featuring Crucial Star); 5. "Even the Little Club" (클럽 이라도 좀 가) (Inst.); 6. "I Know" (알고 있어) (Inst.)	—	—	—N/a
And July	Released: July 18, 2016; Label: CJ E&M Music; Formats: CD, digital download; Track list: 1. "And July" (featuring Dean and DJ Friz); 2. "Underwater"; 3. "No Way"; 4. "Shut Up & Groove" (featuring Dean); 5. "Skit: Rainy Day"; 6. "Don't Come Back" (돌아 오지마) (acoustic ver.)	34	—	KOR: 1,891
/// (You, Clouds, Rain)	Released: June 26, 2017; Label: CJ E&M Music; Formats: CD, digital download; Track list: 1. "Don't Know You" (널 너무 모르고); 2. "Dark Clouds" (featuring Nafla); 3. "Raining with You"; 4. "You, Clouds, Rain" (featuring Shin Yong-jae); 5. "Star" (저 별) (Rain Ver.)	17	12	KOR: 5,194
Wind	Released: March 8, 2018; Label: CJ E&M Music; Formats: CD, digital download; Track list: 1. "Jenga" (featuring Gaeko); 2. "But, Are You?" (괜찮냐고); 3. "Didn't Know Me" (내가 더 나빠); 4. "Wish You Well" (with Davii); 5. "Wind" (바람); 6. "Mianhae"	12	9	KOR: 4,683
Late Autumn	Released: October 13, 2019; Label: Stone Music Entertainment; Formats: CD, digital download; Track list: 1. "Falling Leaves Are Beautiful" (떨어지는 낙엽까지도); 2. "Late Autumn" (만추) (featuring Crush); 3. "Diary" (일기); 4. "Daum" (featuring Colde); 5. "Being Freezed" (얼고 있어); 6. "Missed Call"	18	—	KOR: 2,615
Lyricist	Released: June 10, 2020; Label: Stone Music Entertainment; Formats: CD, digital download; Track list: 1. "Lyricist" (작사가); 2. "Things Are Going Well" (일이 너무 잘 돼); 3. "Your Name" (너의 이름은) (featuring Ash Island); 4. "1/1440" (featuring Ji Chanel); 5. "Not to See You Again."	48	—	KOR: 1,500
Happen	Released: May 20, 2021; Label: P Nation; Formats: CD, digital download; Track list: 1. "Happen" (헤픈 우연); 2. "Like the First Time" (처음처럼) (featuring Gary); 3. "Flu" (감기) (featuring Changmo); 4. "Why"; 5. "The Walking Dead" (미안해 널 사랑해) (featuring Kim Feel); 6. "From the Rain" (빗물에게 들으니) (featuring Ahn Ye-eun); 7. "Hi, Hello" (어쨌든 반가워); 8. "Destiny, It's Just a Tiny Dot."	23	—	—N/a
Last Winter	Released: December 7, 2023; Label: P Nation; Formats: CD, digital download; Track list: 1. "Perhaps, Happy Ending" (어쩌면 해피엔딩); 2. "Stranger" (입술) (featuring 10cm); 3. "Last Winter" (가을부터 겨울까지); 4. "Forget Me Not" (잊혀지는 사랑인가요) (featuring Big Naughty); 5. "Picnic of Night" (나와 춤을) (featuring Chan); 6. "Midnight"; 7. "FM 89.1" (접속); 8. "Love Goes Around Comes Around."	29	—	
Fallin'	Released: November 6, 2024; Label: P Nation; Formats: CD, digital download; Track list: 1. "Fallin'"; 2. "It Was All You" (모든 걸 가르쳐준 사람이니까); 3. "Broken Diary" (미래일기); 4. "Behind the Heart" (겉마음); 5. "Dot" (점); 6. "Without You" (내가 없이); 7. "November Song" (접속)	50	—	KOR: 1,838
Love Virus Pt.1	Released: November 27, 2025; Label: P Nation; Formats: CD, LP, digital download; Track list: 1. "Love Virus" (featuring I.M); 2. "Last Taxi" (featuring Lee Chang-sub); 3. "All Because of You"; 4. "You Made Me"; 5. "The Last Hello"; 6. "Forget Me Not Until You Die"	89	—	KOR: 469

== Singles ==
=== As lead artist ===
List of singles as lead artist, showing year released, select chart positions, sales, certifications, and album name
Title	Year	Peak chart positions				Sales	Certifications	Album
Title	Year	KOR Circle	KOR Hot	PHL	US World	Sales	Certifications	Album
"After I've Wandered a Bit" (조금만 더 방황하고) (feat. Crucial Star)	2014	—	—	—	—		—N/a	Heize
"Even the Little Club" (클럽이라도 좀 가)	2014	—	—	—	—		—N/a	Heize
"My Boyfriend Says Thank You" (내 남자친구가 고맙대)	2015	—	—	—	—		—N/a	Non-album singles
"Pume Sweet Pume" (품 스윗 품) (feat. Monokim)	2015	—	—	—	—		—N/a	Non-album singles
"Don't Come Back" (돌아 오지마) (feat. Junhyung)	2016	11	—	—	—	KOR: 2,500,000	—N/a	Non-album singles
"Shut Up & Groove" (feat. Dean)	2016	27	—	—	24	KOR: 264,326	—N/a	And July
"And July" (feat. Dean and DJ Fritz)	2016	8	—	—	—	KOR: 2,500,000	—N/a	And July
"Hello! UFO" (feat. Go Young-bae)	2016	—	—	—	—	—N/a	—N/a	Don't Dare to Dream OST
"Hello! UFO" (acoustic version)	2016	—	—	—	—	—N/a	—N/a	Don't Dare to Dream OST
"Star" (저 별)	2016	1	—	—	—	KOR: 1,408,113	—N/a	Non-album single
"Round and Round" (feat. Han Soo-ji)	2017	4	—	82	4	KOR: 482,693	—N/a	Guardian: The Lonely and Great God OST
"Don't Know You" (널 너무 모르고)	2017	1	—	*	—	KOR: 2,500,000	—N/a	/// (You, Clouds, Rain)
"You, Clouds, Rain" (비도 오고 그래서) (feat. Shin Yong-jae)	2017	1	—	*	—	KOR: 5,000,000	—N/a	/// (You, Clouds, Rain)
"In the Time Spent with You" (너와 함께한 시간 속에서)	2017	37	—	*	—	KOR: 82,056	—N/a	Non-album single
"Would Be Better" (좋았을걸)	2017	22	—	*	—	KOR: 96,133	—N/a	Prison Playbook OST
"Jenga" (feat. Gaeko)	2018	3	—	*	—	—N/a	—N/a	Wind
"Didn't Know Me" (내가 더 나빠)	2018	6	—	*	—	—N/a	—N/a	Wind
"First Sight" (첫눈에)	2018	3	—	*	—	—N/a	—N/a	Non-album singles
"Run to You" (오롯이)	2019	53	—	*	—	—N/a	—N/a	Non-album singles
"She's Fine"	2019	9	12	*	—	—N/a	—N/a	She's Fine
"We Don't Talk Together" (feat. Giriboy; produced by Suga)	2019	2	6	*	4	—N/a	RIAJ: Gold (st.)	Non-album single
"Can You See My Heart" (내 맘을 볼 수 있나요)	2019	2	9	*	—	—N/a	—N/a	Hotel Del Luna OST
"Falling Leaves Are Beautiful" (떨어지는 낙엽까지도)	2019	2	—	*	—	—N/a	—N/a	Late Autumn
"Destiny Tells Me" (운명이 내게 말해요)	2019	51	—	*	—	—N/a	—N/a	When the Camellia Blooms OST
"Late Autumn" (만추) (feat. Crush)	2019	19	—	*	—	—N/a	—N/a	Late Autumn
"That's All" (다 구렇지 뭐)	2020	105	—	*	—	—N/a	—N/a	Dr. Romantic 2 OST
"Lyricist" (작사가)	2020	46	—	*	—	—N/a	—N/a	Lyricist
"Things Are Going Well" (일이 너무 잘 돼)	2020	70	—	*	—	—N/a	—N/a	Lyricist
"You're Cold" (더 많이 사랑한 사람이 아프대)	2020	62	57	*	—	—N/a	—N/a	It's Okay to Not Be Okay OST
"Happen" (헤픈 우연)	2021	2	6	*	—	—N/a	KMCA: Platinum (Note: Certification for streaming)	Happen
"Mother" (엄마가 필요해)	2022	127	—	*	—	—N/a	—N/a	Non-album single
"The Last" (마지막 너의 인사)	2022	90	—	*	—	—N/a	—N/a	Our Blues OST
"Undo" (없었던 일로)	2022	31	*	*	—	—N/a	—N/a	Undo
"그날의 그대여"	2022	78	*	*	—	—N/a	—N/a	Themselves OST
"VingleVingle" (빙글빙글) (Prod. R.Tee)	2023	68	*	*	—	—N/a	—N/a	Non-album single
"Stranger" (입술) (feat. 10cm)	2023	45	*	*	—	—N/a	—N/a	Last Winter
"Hold Me Back" (멈춰줘)	2024	46	*	*	—	—N/a	—N/a	Queen of Tears OST
"Where Are You" (넌 어디에)	2024	169	*	*	—	—N/a	—N/a	Non-album singles
"Swallowing Tears" (여전히 입술을 깨물죠)	2024	164	*	*	—	—N/a	—N/a	Non-album singles
"Fallin'"	2024	178	*	*	—	—N/a	—N/a	Fallin'
"Love Virus" (feat. I.M)	2025	—	*	*	—	—N/a	—N/a	Love Virus Pt.1
"—" denotes releases that did not chart or were not released in that region. "*" denotes a chart did not exist at that time.

=== As featured artist ===
List of singles as featured artist, showing year released, chart positions, sales, and album name
Title	Year	Peak chart positions		Sales	Album
Title	Year	KOR Circle	KOR Hot	Sales	Album
"Chilin'" (Crucial Star feat. Fana and Heize)	2013	—	—	—N/a	Drawing #2: A Better Man
"Hug Me" (Hyobin feat. Heize)	2014	—	—	—N/a	Non-album singles
"Blind Date" (Vanilla Acoustic feat. Heize)	2016	—	—	—N/a	Non-album singles
"Navigation" (Davii feat. Heize)	2017	—	—	—N/a	Non-album singles
"Wonder If" (Junhyung feat. Heize)	2017	18	—	KOR: 128,096	Non-album singles
"It's Okay" (Kisum feat. Heize)	2018	73	—	—N/a	Non-album singles
"Only Me" (Davii feat. Heize)	2018	—	—	—N/a	Non-album singles
"Blur" (Lee Moon-sae feat. Heize)	2018	86	—	—N/a	Between Us
"Glue" (Far East Movement feat. Heize and Shawn Wasabi)	2019	—	—	—N/a	Non-album singles
"Cold" (Gaeko feat. Heize)	2020	40	40	—N/a	Non-album singles
"Love Distance" (요를 붙이는 사이) (Jooyoung feat. Heize)	2020	—	—	—N/a	Non-album singles
"Can't Sleep" (잠이 들어야) (Loco feat. Heize)	2020	36	16	—N/a	Some Time
"2easy" (NIve feat. Heize)	2020	—	—	—N/a	Non-album single
"RAL 9002" (하양) (Youra feat. Heize)	2020	—	—	—N/a	Gaussian
"Based on a True Story" (내 얘기 같아) (Epik High feat. Heize)	2021	12	—	—N/a	Epik High Is Here 上 (Part 1)
"When It Snows" (눈이 오잖아) (Lee Mu-jin feat. Heize)	2021	6	7	—N/a	Non-album singles
"Don't Wanna Go Back" (Jihyo Duet. Heize)	2023	—	—	—N/a	Non-album singles
"Slowly" (I.M feat. Heize)	2024	174	—	—N/a	Non-album singles
"Unspoken" (말하지 않아도) (Pateko feat. Heize, Dynamic Duo)	2024	—	—	—N/a	Non-album singles
"Ferris Wheel" (관람차) (B.I feat. Heize)	2025	—	—	—N/a	Wonderland
"—" denotes releases that did not chart or were not released in that region.

=== Collaborations ===
Title	Year	Peak chart positions		Sales	Album
Title	Year	KOR	US World	Sales	Album
"Don't Stop" (with various artists)	2015	3	—	KOR: 155,244	Non-album single
"Lil' Something" (with Vibe and Chen)	2016	13	17	KOR: 402,402	SM Station Season 1
"It'll Pass" (with Jung Seung-hwan)	2023	75	—	—N/a	Non-album singles
"Never Meant to Be" (안 될 사람) (with Giriboy)	2026	140	—	—N/a	Non-album singles
"—" denotes releases that did not chart or were not released in that region.

== Other charted songs ==
List of other charted songs, showing year released, selected chart positions, sales, and album name
Title	Year	Peak chart positions	Sales	Album
Title	Year	KOR	Sales	Album
"Me, Myself and I" (featuring Jessi and Wheesung)	2015	19	KOR: 134,960	Unpretty Rapstar 2
"Don't Make Money" (featuring Chanyeol)	2015	43	KOR: 60,192	Unpretty Rapstar 2
"Dark Clouds" (먹구름) (featuring Nafla)	2017	12	KOR: 195,556	/// (You, Clouds, Rain)
"Rainin' With U"	2017	64	KOR: 37,966	/// (You, Clouds, Rain)
"Star" (저 별) (Rain ver.)	2017	80	KOR: 32,643	/// (You, Clouds, Rain)
"But, Are You?" (괜찮냐고)	2018	13	—N/a	Wind
"Wish You Well" (잘 살길 바래) (with Davii)	2018	40	—N/a	Wind
"Mianhae"	2018	59	—N/a	Wind
"Wind" (바람)	2018	93	—N/a	Wind
"So, It Ends?" (그러니까) (featuring Colde)	2019	32	—N/a	She's Fine
"Dispatch" (featuring Simon Dominic)	2019	115	—N/a	She's Fine
"No Reason" (이유)	2019	130	—N/a	She's Fine
"Umbrella Calls for Rain" (문득 그런 생각이 들어) (featuring Nafla)	2019	138	—N/a	She's Fine
"Tree Only Look at You" (너의 나무) (featuring Jooyoung)	2019	158	—N/a	She's Fine
"Hitch Hiding" (숨고 싶어요) (featuring Sunwoo Jung-a)	2019	161	—N/a	She's Fine
"But, I Am Your Buddy (Buddy)" (featuring Davii)	2019	162	—N/a	She's Fine
"Diary" (일기)	2019	69	—N/a	Late Autumn
"Daum" (featuring Colde)	2019	93	—N/a	Late Autumn
"Being Freezed" (얼고 있어)	2019	120	—N/a	Late Autumn
"Like the First Time" (처음처럼) (featuring Gary)	2021	38	—N/a	Happen
"Flu" (감기) (featuring Changmo)	2021	61	—N/a	Happen
"The Walking Dead" (미안해 널 사랑해) (featuring Kim Feel)	2021	104	—N/a	Happen
"From the Rain" (빗물에게 들으니) (featuring Ahn Ye-eun)	2021	130	—N/a	Happen
"Why"	2021	143	—N/a	Happen
"Hi, Hello" (어쨌든 반가워)	2021	176	—N/a	Happen
"Sad Ending" (featuring George)	2022	186	—N/a	Undo
"I Don't Lie" (featuring Giriboy)	2022	176	—N/a	Undo
"Thief" (도둑놈) (featuring Minnie)	2022	199	—N/a	Undo

== Music videos ==
Name of music video, year released, director, and additional notes
Title	Year	Director(s)	Ref.
"Lil Somethin'"	2016	Jum Shim (HIT GUN ArtFilm)	
"Shut Up & Groove"	2016	Seong Wonmo (Digipedi)	
"And July"	2016	Seong Wonmo (Digipedi)	
"Star"	2016	Seong Wonmo (Digipedi)	
"Don't Know You"	2017	Seong Wonmo (Digipedi)	
"You, Clouds, Rain"	2017	Purple Straw Film	
"In the Time Spent with You"	2017	Unknown	
"Didn't Know Me"	2018	Mustache Film	
"Jenga"	2018	Seong Wonmo (Digipedi)	
"Mianhae"	2018	Seong Wonmo (Digipedi)	
"First Sign"	2018	Shin Hee-won (Oddity)	
"She's Fine"	2019	Beomjin (VM Project Architecture)	
"Dispatch"	2019	Shin Hee-won (Oddity)	
"No Reason"	2019	Shin Hee-won (Oddity)	—N/a
"We Don't Talk Together"	2019	Seong Wonmo (Digipedi)	
"Falling Leaves Are Beautiful"	2019	Mustache Film	
"Lyricist / Things Are Going Well"	2020	Han Sa Min (Dextor Lab)	
"Your Name"	2020	Mustache Film	
"Happen"	2021	Seong Wonmo (Digipedi)	
"Mother"	2022	Wooje Kim (ETUI)	
"Undo"	2022	Han Sa Min (Dextor Lab)	
"VingleVingle"	2023	Ziyong Kim (FantazyLab)	
"Stranger"	2023	KIM IN TAE (AFF)	
Guest appearances
"No Jam"	2016	Unknown	
"Navigation"	2017	Unknown	
"Wonder If"	2017	Tiger Cave	
"Only Me"	2018	Seong Wonmo (Digipedi)	
"Love Distance"	2020	Lee Se Hyung & Lee Jae Don	
"Can't Sleep"	2020	Woogie Kim (MOTHER)	
"Based on a True Story"	2021	Taerim Moon	
"Doesn't make sense"	2021	a HOBIN film	
