= Crucial Star =

South Korean rapper (born 1989)

- Born: Park Se-yoon; October 16, 1989 (age 36)
- Origin: South Korea
- Genres: K-hip hop, K-pop
- Occupations: Rapper; record producer
- Years active: 2007–present
- Labels: Soul Company; Grandline; C-JeS; VAKER
- Formerly of: Libra Twins

Korean name
- Hangul: 박세윤
- RR: Bak Seyun
- MR: Pak Seyun

Park Se-yoon (Korean: 박세윤; born October 16, 1989), more commonly known as Crucial Star (크루셜 스타), is a South Korean rapper and record producer. He started writing music at the age of 17 and joined the hip hop duo Libra Twins in 2007, before debuting as a solo rapper in 2010. He released his first EP, A Star Goes Up, in 2011.

== Biography ==
Park Se-yoon was born on October 16, 1989, in Seoul, South Korea. His father is the painter Hang-Ryul Park.

He made his musical debut at the age of seventeen in the hip hop group Libra Twins. Several years later, he signed with independent hip hop label Soul Company, working under the name Crucial Star. He and label mate Mad Clown collaborated on the digital album Mad Clown VS Crucial Star in 2010. The following year, he released his first EP, A Star Goes Up, and his first full-length album, A Star From The Basement.

Following the dissolution of Soul Company in 2012, Crucial Star moved to Grandline Entertainment. While with Grandline, he released two mix tapes, Drawing #1: A Dream Spokesman (2012) and Drawing 2: A Better Man (2013), two albums, FALL (2012) and Midnight (2014), and one EP, Boyhood (2015).

In 2015 he appeared as a contestant on Mnet television rap contest Show Me the Money 4. He was eliminated in the preliminary round after forgetting his lyrics. In October 2015, Crucial Star's agency published a statement announcing that he and Unpretty Rapstar 2 contestant Heize were in a relationship. A week after this announcement, it was reported that they had broken up several months prior.

He left Grandline Entertainment in January 2016 when his contract ended. In April, he signed with C-JeS Entertainment.

== Discography ==
=== Studio albums ===
Title	Album details	Peak chart positions
Title	Album details	KOR
Midnight	Released: October 16, 2014; Label: Grandline Entertainment; Formats: CD, digital download; Track listing: 1. Midnight (feat. Taylor); 2. 퇴실; 3. Limousine Dream; 4. 두통약 (Become A Man); 5. 바쁜 남자 (Busy Man) (feat. Louie of Geeks); 6. Pretty Girl (feat. Lovey); 7. Paris; 8. Dreams Forgotten (Interlude); 9. 꿈을 파는 가게 (feat. Bob James, Mayson the Soul); 10. Owl (feat. Donutman); 11. Fire; 12. Sweet Life (feat. Konsoul); 13. I'm The One; 14. Same Boy (feat. Loco); 15. Blessing	29
Maze Garden	Released: December 11, 2018; Label: VAKER; Formats: CD, digital download; Track listing: 1. 동전 한 닢 (Intro); 2. Fontana di Trevi; 3. Direct Message (feat. Sujin Park); 4. 청담동; 5. 할머니 (Grandma); 6. 미로정원 (Maze Garden) / 두 갈래 길 7. 두 얼굴; 8. 혼자 이 밤을; 9. Pen (A.D.W.A.D); 10. Ghost Writer; 11. Singer Songwriter (feat. 김이지); 12. Just A Song; 13. 언젠간 내 시간이 올거야 (feat. Khundi Panda, The Quiett); 14. Complex; 15. 세레머니 (CELEBRATION) (feat. Rick Bridges); 16. 쉬어도 돼 (feat. Babylon); 17. 별의 별 (feat. DJ Wegun)	98
Serenity, Courage, Wisdom	Released: October 8, 2021; Label: Starry Nightt Music; Formats: CD, digital download	—

=== Extended plays ===
Title	Album details	Peak chart positions
Title	Album details	KOR
A Star Goes Up	Released: January 27, 2011; Label: Soul Company; Formats: CD, digital download; Track listing: 1. It's My Turn (feat. Zion.T); 2. Trendsetterz (feat. Basick); 3. Tonight (feat. Satbyeol); 4. Change Of My Life (Interlude); 5. Change Of My Life (feat. Dok2 and The Quiett); 6. New Generation (feat. Pento); 7. 비스듬히 걸쳐 (Rebirth) (feat. Donutman); 8. 잘 찾아봐; 9. Phone Number (feat. The Quiett and Kebee)	46
A Star From The Basement	Released: August 4, 2011; Label: Soul Company; Formats: CD, digital download; Track listing: 1. Last Trip; 2. Real Me; 3. What's This Art For; 4. SCR (Super Crucial Rap); 5. What's Your Name (feat. Swings); 6. 그릇; 7. No More Romance (feat. Jo Hyun-ah); 8. One Better Day; 9. I Just Wanna (feat. CZA); 10. 쉽지않은 대답; 11. 시간이 없어; 12. 옷가게 (Can't Go Out) (feat. Donutman); 13. Chocoholic (Rebirth); 14. 개꿈; 15. No Pay No Gain (feat. Jerry.K); 16. Pain 09; 17. Stupid Love Song; 18. 약속; 19. Deep In A Dream (Outro); 20. From The Basement (feat. B-Free, JJK and The Quiett)	26
Fall	Released: November 27, 2012; Label: Grandline Entertainment; Formats: CD, digital download; Track listing: 1. One Life 2 Live; 2. Real Love (feat. Venus); 3. Own Way (feat. Take One, The Quiett and Zion.T); 4. 난 아파 (feat. Rimi); 5. Flat Shoes (Brother Su Remix) (feat. Lovey); 6. 우을증; 7. I'm OK; 8. Nothing Lasts Forever	19
Boyhood	Released: May 7, 2015; Label: Grandline Entertainment; Formats: CD, digital download; Track listing: 1. 내 글라이더 (My Glider); 2. AIA (feat. Jooyoung); 3. Pet (feat. Stella Jang); 4. 막내 아들 (The Youngest Son); 5. 이어폰소년 (Earphones Boy); 6. Boys to Men	26
Fall 2	Released: October 28, 2016; Label: C-JeS Entertainment; Formats: CD, digital download; Track listing: 1. 가을엔 (feat. Kim Na-young); 2. Coffee (feat. Donutman); 3. 그녀는 내 것이 아닐 때 아름답다; 4. 이뻐서 힘들어 (feat. Louie of Geeks, Brother Su, Lovey); 5. 또 있을까 싶어 (feat. XIA of JYJ); 6. Bulletproof (feat. Hash Swan, Sik-K, Konsoul)	49
starry night '17	Released: September 22, 2017; Label: VAKER; Formats: CD, digital download; Track listing: 1. 보내줘 (feat. Brother Su); 2. 유학 (feat. Han All); 3. 야식; 4. 데리러 갈게 (feat. Sik-K, Lil Boi); 5. 기억여행 (fade away); 6. 내버려둬 (starry night)	48
Half A Wing	Released: October 17, 2019; Label: VAKER; Formats: Digital download	—
Sense and Sensibility (이성과 감성)	Released: November 17, 2020; Label: Starry Nightt Music; Formats: CD, digital download	—
Gold (금) (with QM)	Released: February 28, 2023; Label: Daytona Entertainment; Formats: CD, digital download	—

=== Mixtapes ===
Title	Album details	Peak chart positions
Title	Album details	KOR
Drawing #2: A Better Man	Released: November 25, 2013; Label: Grandline Entertainment; Formats: CD, digital download	—
Drawing #3: Untitled	Released: March 30, 2016; Label: FISB-); Formats: CD, digital download	83

=== Singles ===
Title	Year	Peak chart positions	Album
Title	Year	KOR	Album
"I Just Want U"	2010	—	Non-album singles
"Catch Me If U Can"	2010	—	Non-album singles
"New Generation" (feat. Pento)	2011	—	A Star Goes Up
"Tonight" (feat. Satbyeol)	2011	—	A Star Goes Up
"Chocoholic (Rebirth)"	2011	—	A Star From The Basement
"Can't Go Out" (옷가게) (feat. Donutman)	2011	—	A Star From The Basement
"What's This Art For"	2011	—	A Star From The Basement
"I'm OK" (생각보다)	2011	—	Fall
"Flat Shoes" (feat. Lovey)	2012	—	Fall
"Real Love" (feat. Satbyeol)	2012	—	Fall
"Drinks Up"	2013	—	Drawing #2: A Better Man
"A Winter Love Song"	2013	86	Non-album singles
"Three Things I Want to Give You" (너에게 주고 싶은 세 가지) (feat. Sojin of Girl's Day)	2014	32	Non-album singles
"Show Me Your Light" (with Shin Ji-su)	2014	60	Non-album singles
"Paris"	2014	91	Midnight
"Pretty Girl" (feat. Lovey)	2014	—	Midnight
"A Store That Sells Dreams" (꿈을 파는 가게) (feat Bob James & Mayson the Soul)	2014	—	Midnight
"The Youngest Son" (막내 아들)	2015	—	Boyhood
"AIA" (feat. Jooyoung)	2015	— (Note: "AIA" did not enter the Circle Digital Chart, but it peaked at number 99 on the component Download Chart.)	Boyhood
"Love Yourself"	2015	—	Non-album singles
"The Bench" (그 벤치)	2016	—	Non-album singles
"One"	2016	—	Drawing #3: Untitled
"Strength" (힘) (feat. Hanhae & Brother Su)	2016	—	Non-album single
"Ain't Nobody Like You" (또 있을까 싶어) (feat. Xia of JYJ)	2016	92	Fall 2
"Fall" (가을엔) (feat. Kim Na-young)	2016	— (Note: "Fall" did not enter the Circle Digital Chart, but it peaked at number 63 on the component Download Chart.)	Fall 2
"You Can Rest" (쉬어도 돼) (feat. Babylon)	2017	91	Maze Garden
"Study Abroad" (유학) (feat. Han All)	2017	—	starry night '17
"Night Alone" (혼자 이 밤을)	2018	—	Maze Garden
"Think" (생각해)	2018	—	Non-album single
"Singer Songwriter" (feat. Ezzy)	2018	—	Maze Garden
"Direct Message" (feat. Sujin Park)	2018	—	Maze Garden
"Grandma" (할머니)	2018	—	Maze Garden
"2 Faces" (두 얼굴)	2018	—	Maze Garden
"Just A Song"	2018	—	Maze Garden
"Cigarette"	2019	—	Non-album single
"It's a different thing to love her and make her happy" (그녀를 사랑하는 것과 행복하게 해주는 것은 별개야) (feat. Jeebanoff)	2019	—	Half A Wing
"Hammock" (해먹) (feat. Bibi)	2019	—	Non-album single
"Work To Do" (밀린 일)	2019	—	Half A Wing
"Please Lie to Me" (거짓말이라도 해줘) (feat. Ezzy)	2019	—	Non-album singles
"Telescope" (천체망원경) (feat. Leellamarz & msftz)	2020	—	Non-album singles
"Stranger" (모르는 사이)	2020	—	Non-album singles
"Call Me Right Now"	2020	—	Hwaak!
"Don't Be Blue" (슬퍼말아요)	2020	—	Good Night, Starry Night
"Starry Nightt Gang" (with DNEIRF & Wynn)	2020	—	Starry Night Vibe
"Your Night" (너의 밤엔)	2020	—	Sense and Sensibility
"White Out" (하얗게) (with Ji Chanel)	2020	—	Good Night, Starry Night
"Even Though I Love You" (그래도 너가 좋은 걸 어떡해) (feat. Jeminn)	2021	—	Good Night, Starry Night
"Cherry Blossom"	2021	—	Non-album single
"Humming"	2021	—	Serenity, Courage, Wisdom
"Mamba Mentality"	2021	—	Serenity, Courage, Wisdom
"The Evil is Easy, The Good is Hard" (선은 어렵고 악은 쉽다)	2021	—	Serenity, Courage, Wisdom
"2022" (feat. A-Chess)	2022	—	Non-album singles
"It's Always Just the Beginning" (나는 언제나 이제 시작일 뿐이었다)	2022	—	Non-album singles
"A Solitary Man" (고독한 크루셜스타의 방)	2022	—	Non-album singles
"Memento Mori"	2022	—	Non-album singles
"100 Bars" (백 마디 말보다)	2022	—	Non-album singles
"Green Thumb" (물 갈아주기) (feat. Quokka)	2022	—	Non-album singles
"Free Haee" (프리해) (feat. OLNL, Ji Chanel, EXN, Jehwwn, H3hyeon, Quokka, Kim Mi-jeong)	2022	—	Non-album singles
"Fisherman" (with DNEIRF & Wynn, feat. Siso)	2022	—	Good Night, Starry Night
"Sky" (하늘)	2022	—	Good Night, Starry Night
"Tourist"	2022	—	Good Night, Starry Night
"Ajushi" (아저씨) (with Leellamarz, QM, Kim Jae-wook, NSW Yoon, Damini)	2022	44	Show Me the Money 11 Episode 1
"Jungle Radio" (정글 라디오) (with QM)	2023	—	Gold
"Jet Ski" (with QM)	2023	—	Gold
"come to my stu" (Remix) (feat. Leellamarz)	2023	—	Non-album singles
"Number One" (feat. Skinny Brown)	2023	—	Non-album singles
"Starry Night" (feat. Malitabu)	2023	—	Non-album singles
"Good Night, Starry Night" (별 볼 일 있는 밤)	2023	—	Good Night, Starry Night
"Fallen Leaves" (낙엽)	2023	—	Non-album singles
"Monica Bellucci"	2023	—	Non-album singles
"Nihilism Watch" (허무주의보)	2024	—	Non-album singles
"2009" (feat. unofficialboyy)	2024	—	Non-album singles
"Say No!" (feat. Swings)	2024	—	Non-album singles
