= Ra.D =

South Korean singer and music producer

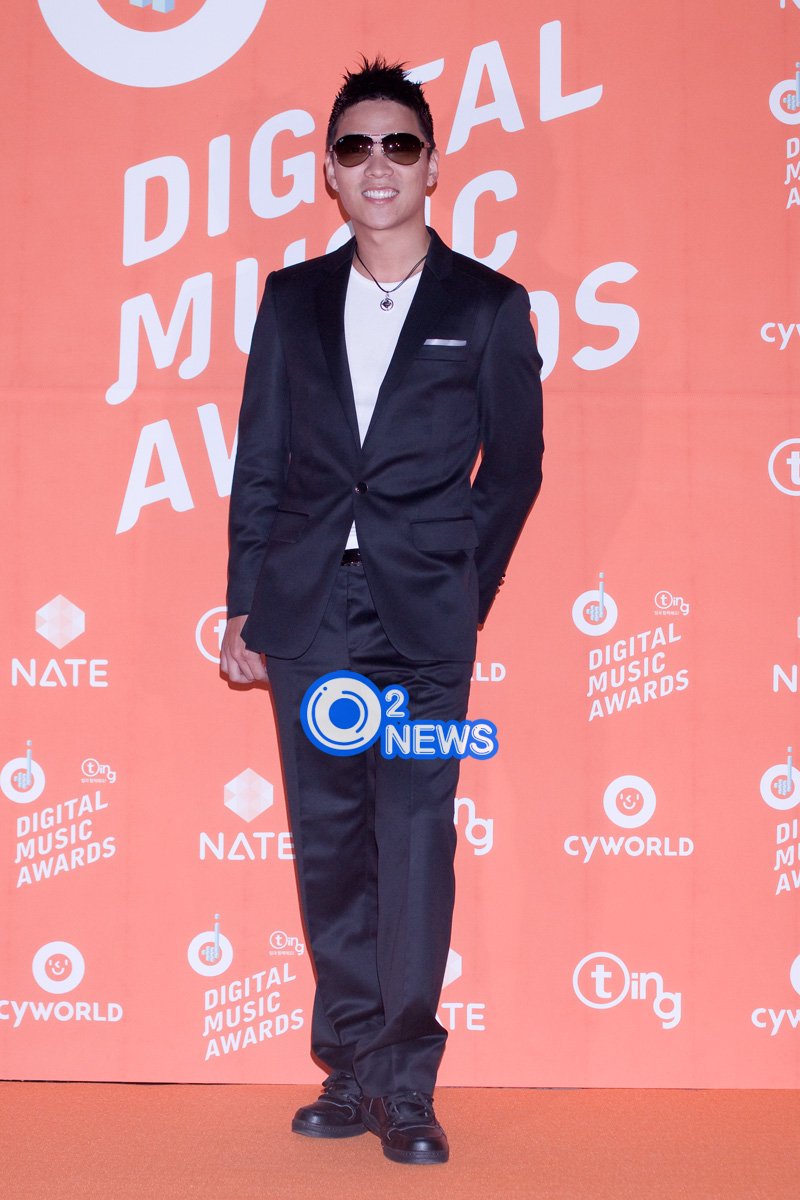

Background information
- Born: Lee Doo-hyun (이두현); May 6, 1980 (age 46)
- Origin: South Korea
- Genres: R&B, soul, hip hop
- Occupations: Singer, songwriter, music producer
- Years active: 2002–present
- Label: LOEN Entertainment (present)

Lee Doo-hyun (Hangul: 이두현; born May 6, 1980), better known by his stage name Ra.D (Hangul: 라디) is a South Korean singer, songwriter and producer who debuted in 2002 with the album My Name is Ra.D. He started his own record company, RealCollabo, and has since worked on the albums of numerous artists. He returned in February 2013 with the single "It's Been So Long" following a 6-year break.

Ra.D has produced for artists such as 2PM, Brown Eyed Girls' Gain, Dynamic Duo, KeBee, UMC, Ahn Trio and Cho PD.

On October 26, 2015, he announced RealCollabo would be closed after established for seven years. "Draw You", a collaboration project of Ra.D, d.ear, Brother Su, and Jooyoung, is the last release from this label (co-release with 24thStreet).

== Discography ==
=== Studio albums ===
Title	Album details	Peak chart positions	Sales
Title	Album details	KOR	Sales
My Name Is Ra.D	Released: September 18, 2002; Label: Soribada; Formats: CD, cassette	—N/a	—N/a
Realcollabo	Released: December 12, 2008; Label: RealCollabo; Formats: CD, digital download	—N/a	—N/a
Realcollabo + RMX	Released: July 15, 2009; Label: RealCollabo; Formats: CD, digital download	—N/a	—N/a
Soundz	Released: July 24, 2014; Label: Loen Entertainment; Formats: CD, digital download	22	KOR: 656

=== Best albums ===
Title	Album details	Peak chart positions	Sales
Title	Album details	KOR	Sales
Ra.D	Released: December 15, 2020; Label: Realcollabo; Formats: CD, digital download	—N/a	—N/a

=== Extended plays ===
Title	Album details	Peak chart positions	Sales
Title	Album details	KOR	Sales
Small Story (작은 이야기)	Released: March 29, 2013; Label: Loen Entertainment; Formats: CD, digital download	24	—N/a

=== Singles ===
Title	Year	Peak chart positions	Sales (DL)	Album
Title	Year	KOR	Sales (DL)	Album
"So One" (소원)	2002	—N/a	—N/a	My Name Is Ra.D
"Cool Fella" (멋있는 친구) feat. Jungin, Inbal, DJ Bay with ziEyA	2008	—N/a	—N/a	RealCollabo
"I'm in Love" (Piano Remix)	2009	59	—N/a	RealCollabo + RMX
"It's Been So Long" (오랜만이죠) feat. Shin Ji-soo	2013	8	KOR: 534,745	Small Story
"Thank You, Thank You" (고마워 고마워)	2013	10	KOR: 296,101+	Small Story
"I Need a Somebody" (누군가 필요해) feat. Brother Su	2013	9	KOR: 172,414+	Wish Me a Merry Christmas
"Fly Away"	2014	24	KOR: 93,650+	Soundz
"Still" (여전히)	2015	40	KOR: 78,150	Non-album single
"I Want You" (싶은데)	2016	57	KOR: 32,784	I Want You & Good Girl
"Look into Your Eyes" (눈을 보고 말해요)	2017	97	—N/a	Non-album singles
"Day Off" (쉬는날)	2017	—	—N/a	Non-album singles
"Drive Away 2"	2017	—	—N/a	Non-album singles
"Unfinished Story" (아직 끝나지 않은 이야기)	2017	—	—N/a	Non-album singles
"Can't Forget Anything (Piano RMX)" (넌 내게 했던 얘기를 (Piano RMX))	2018	—	—N/a	Non-album singles
"pingpong" (핑퐁) feat. Brother Su	2018	—	—N/a	Non-album singles
"30" feat. Michael	2019	—	—N/a	Non-album singles
"Cover my ears" (귀를 막아줘)	2020	—	—N/a	Non-album singles
"Open It Up" feat. Jinbo	2020	—	—N/a	Non-album singles
"The Film" (오래된 영화)	2020	—	—N/a	Non-album singles
"Walkin'"	2020	—	—N/a	Non-album singles
"Because Of You" (너 때문에)	2020	—	—N/a	Ra.D
"Goodbye (Live RMX)"	2020	—	—N/a	Ra.D
"12 months" (열두달)	2021	—	—N/a	Non-album singles
"what we need" (들어봐줘요)	2022	—	—N/a	Non-album singles
"Kidult" (키덜트)	2023	—	—N/a	Non-album singles
"I'm still missing you"	2024	—	—N/a	Non-album singles

=== Collaboration singles ===
Title	Year	Peak chart positions	Sales	Album
Title	Year	KOR	Sales	Album
"Constellation" (with Kebee)	2007	—		Poetree Syndrome
"Mother's Miso Soup" (어머니의 된장국) (with Dynamic Duo)	2008	—		Last Days
"Father" (아버지) (with Dynamic Duo)	2008	—		Last Days
"Have You Ever Been in Love (Acoustic ver.)" (사랑에 빠져본 적 있나요) (Acoustic ver.)" (with Standing Egg)	2011	—		Non-album single
"Back to the Future" (미래로 돌아가자) (with Eluphant)	2011	97	KOR (DL): 68,914+	Apollo 1/3
"Time for Love" (연애시대) (with Lee Seung-gi)	2011	6	KOR (DL): 2,278,798+	Non-album single
"Teacher" (with IU)	2011	9	KOR (DL): 797,920+	Last Fantasy
"Take Out" (with Gain)	2012	21	KOR (DL): 404,820+	LOEN TREE Summer Story
"Farewell Scene" (이별 Scene) (with Siaena)	2012	—	—N/a	Cafe De Siaena
"Hang Up the Phone" (with Jooyoung)	2012	—	—N/a	From Me to You
"I Hope" (그랬으면 좋겠어) (with Shin Seung-hun)	2013	—	—N/a	Great Wave
"Green Light" (그린라이트) (with JuB of Sunny Hill)	2015	—	—N/a	Non-album singles
"Draw You" (너를 그리다) (with d.ear, Brother Su, & Jooyoung)	2015	—	—N/a	Non-album singles
"Woman on the beach" (해변의 여인) (with Jang SunYoung)	2016	—	—N/a	Duet Song Festival 18th
"Short Hair" (단발머리) (with Jang Seon-yeong)	2016	—	—N/a	Duet Song Festival 19th
"YOU (Day ver.)" (vocal. HongJiEun)	2021	—	—N/a	prod by Ra.D
"No pouting (Day Ver.)" (화풀어 (Vocal. 민서) (Day Ver.)) Vocal. Minseo	2021	—	—N/a	prod by Ra.D 2
"Easy love" (vocal. 99honest)	2021	—	—N/a	prod by Ra.D 3
"season" (with Jang SunYoung)	2021	—	—N/a	prod by Ra.D 4
"prod by Ra.D 5" (prod by 라디 5 (Vocal. 도연)) (Vocal. Doyeon)	2022	—	—N/a	prod by Ra.D 5
"always" (with Sori)	2023	—	—N/a	Non-album single

=== Soundtracks ===
Title	Year	Peak chart positions	Sales	Album
Title	Year	KOR	Sales	Album
"A Certain Heart Fluttering"(어떤 설레임)	2013	42	KOR (DL): 83,734+	Dating Agency: Cyrano OST
"Lovesome"	2016	95		Don't Dare to Dream OST
"The Same Day" (똑같은 날)	2017	—		Suspicious Partner OST
"Just Because" (그냥 보고싶은 사이)	2017	—		Rain or Shine (TV series) (Just Between Lovers) OST
"Fairytale" (동화)	2019	— (Note: "Fairytale" did not enter the Circle Digital Chart, but appeared at number 171 on the component Download Chart.)		Encounter OST
"A Day (Piano Ver.)"	2019	—		I'm Not a Robot OST

== Producer ==
Year	Artist	Song/Album
2002	Cho PD	Stardom in Future Flow
2003	ToDay	Another Level
2004	UMC	XSLP
2008	KeBee	"Constellation" feat. Ra.D
2008	Dynamic Duo	"Mother's Miso Soup (어머니의 된장국)" feat. Ra.D
2008	Dynamic Duo	"Father (아버지)" feat. Ra.D
2010	Narsha with Sungha Jung	"I'm in Love"
2010	Gain	"Esperando"
2010	2PM	"I Can't"
2011	Kim Jin-pyo	"I Shouldn't Go (가지말걸 그랬어)" feat. Joo Young
2011	Alex	"TOMBOI" feat. Lovey
2011	Eluphant	"Back to the Future (미래로 돌아가자)"
2011	Lee Seung-gi	"Time for Love (연애시대)"
2011	IU	"Teacher" feat. Ra.D
2012	Gain with Ra.D	"Take Out"
2012	Siaena	"Touch (만져요)"
2012	Siaena	"Even If I Want(원하고 원해도)"
2012	Siaena	"Farewell Scene (이별 Scene)" feat. Ra.D
2012	Jooyoung	"Hang Up the Phone" feat. Ra.D
2012	Jooyoung	"Farewell That It Was (이별이란 걸)"
2013	Shin Seung-hun	"I Hope (그랬으면 좋겠어)" feat. Ra.D

== Awards and nominations ==
Year	Organization	Category	Nominated work	Result
2009	Rhythmer Awards	R&B Album of the Year	RealCollabo	Nominated
2009	Rhythmer Awards	R&B Single of the Year	"Sweet Love"	Nominated
2009	Rhythmer Awards	R&B Artist of the Year	Ra.D	Nominated
2009	Rhythmer Awards	Producer of the Year	Ra.D	Won
2009	Rhythmer Awards	Collaboration of the Year	"Cool Fella" (feat. Jungin, Inbal, DJ Bay With ziEyA)	Nominated
2009	Cyworld Digital Music Awards	Tam Eum Mania (August)	"I'm in Love"	Won
2010	7th Korean Music Awards	Best R&B and Soul album	RealCollabo	Won
