= Soul Company =

South Korean record label

- Company type: Private company (defunct 2011)
- Industry: Music
- Genre: Korean hip hop
- Founded: 2004
- Founder: Kebee, The Quiett
- Services: Record production, talent agency
- Website: SoulCompany.net (via Internet Archive)

Soul Company (Korean: 소울컴퍼니) was an independent Korean hip hop record label and talent agency based in Seoul, South Korea. It was founded in 2004 by rappers Kebee and The Quiett and played an important role in the foundation of the underground hip hop scene in South Korea. The label represented rappers such as Crucial Star and Mad Clown. Soul Company's dissolution was announced in September 2011, and the company ceased operations in November of the same year.

== History ==
=== 2004–2007: Founding and establishment ===
Soul Company's founding artists Kebee and the Quiett met in the late 1990s through programmes at the Haja Centre (하자센터), an alternative vocational education centre for teenagers operated jointly by Yonsei University and the Seoul Metropolitan Government. They began the label with a compilation album released in 2004 entitled The Bangerz, featuring tracks by the Quiett and Kebee as well as Planet Black (플래닛 블랙), among others. Later that year, Kebee released a solo album, Evolutional Poems, which gained attention for both him and the label. In July 2005, in response to continued interest from fans, The Bangerz was re-released.

In 2007, Soul Company released the album Official Bootleg Vol. 2. It spoke out on a number of social issues in South Korea, with Kebee describing the stress of college entrance exams in his song "Epilogue to Senior Year" (고 3 후기, "Go 3 Hugi"), while Loquence, D.C., and Planet Black discussed difficulties and disappointments they faced in reintegrating into society after returning from mandatory military service in their song "Army Reserve" (예비역, "Yebiyeok"). P&Q on the tracks "I'll be watchin' you" (지켜볼게, "Jikyeobolge") and Kebee in "Oh Right!" (아 맞다, "A Matda") also criticised the perceived inauthenticity of mainstream hip hop in South Korea, attacking some unnamed targets as "hip hop cosplayers". However, The Quiett also set a precedent of collaboration between underground and mainstream South Korean hip hop artists such as Tasha Reid, Drunken Tiger, and Dynamic Duo in his album The Real Me later that year.

=== 2008–2009: In concert ===
In July 2008, Soul Company held a concert entitled Show me the hiphop. That year the company also began holding Judgement Night, reported to be South Korea's first hip hop/hardcore joint performance.

In February 2009, Soul Company held a Valentine's Day concert entitled My Funny Valentine at Rollinghall in the Hongdae area (near Hongik University), featuring performances by Kebee, UMC, Junggigo (also known as Cubic), and Swings. In July, Soul Company artists came together to record the single "Aeiou Eo?! part 2". The title was a reference to an album released by Soul Company in 2004. In May and October, they hosted the third and fourth joint Judgement Night concerts with GMC Records; the latter was held at V-Hall in Hongdae. In August, they held another concert at V-Hall featuring performances by The Quiett, Loptimist, and DJ Wegun, and held a group stage performance entitled Summer Ground.

=== 2010–2011: Artist lineup changes and dissolution ===
In January 2010, Soul Company released the digital album Mad Clown VS Crucial Star, which within a few days of its release was one of the top 10 sellers on Cyworld. The last track, "Parting" (이별은, "Ibyeoleun") by DC, received particular praise from the Seoul Sinmun. In March, The Quiett released his fourth LP with Soul Company, Quiet Storm: A Night Record. In July, Soul Company held a concert at Club Fabric near Kyungsung University in the southern city of Busan. In October, Soul Company released an online single by RHYME-A- (라임 어택) entitled Speak The Truth (진실을 말해). In December, Soul Company suffered a blow with the departure of The Quiett. His departure from Soul Company was announced through the label's release of the album Still A Team (스틸 어 팀). Early the following month, he announced that he would be forming his own label Illionaire Records with Dok2. The Quiett described his move as giving him the freedom to preserve the kind of music he wanted to perform and bring new vitality to the South Korean hip hop scene.

In April, Soul Company held a joint concert with Pastel Music (파스텔 뮤직) sponsored by Jin Air devoted to environmental protection. The concert, entitled Save The Air Green Concert, was held at KT&G Sangsang Madang (KT&G 상상마당) in Hongdae. Soul Company artists who participated include Crucial Star, Fana (화나), and Eluphant (이루펀트).

In September 2011 it was announced that the label would be dissolved. One contributing factor was that Soul Company co-founder and Eluphant duo member Kebee had to leave for two years to perform his mandatory military service which he had been delaying. Just a few days after the news of the breakup, Eluphant released a digital single entitled "To the Future" (미래로 나아가자, "Miraero Naagaja"), following which they indicated the duo would also become dormant for two years. In late November, Soul Company artists held a farewell concert at AX-KOREA (악스코리아) to commemorate the label's dissolution.

== Former artists ==
Soloists

- Crucial Star
- G-Slow
- Loptimist
- Mad Clown
- Pento
- Planet Black
- Prima Vista
- RHYME-A-
- Smooth Tale
- The Quiett

Groups

- Choejeokwa (Fana and Kal Nal)
- Eluphant (Kebee and Minos)
- Loquence (Jerry.K and Makesense)
- Syntax-Error (Creiz Rap'er and D.C)

DJs

- DJ Dopsh
- DJ Silent
- DJ Wegun

== Discography ==
=== Collective albums ===
- The Bangerz (Bonus Track: Soul Company Show) (2004)
- Official Bootleg Vol.1 (2005)
- The Bangerz: Instrumentals (2005)
- Official Bootleg Vol.2 (2007)
- Soulful Christmas 2008 (2008)
- The Bangerz (re-release with Bonus Track: Interview) (2008)
- 아에이오우 어!? PT.2 (Digital single) (2009)
- Still a Team (Digital single) (2010)
- Save the Air (Digital single) (2010)
- The Amazing Mixtape (2011)
- The Best (2011)

=== Solo albums/EPs ===
- Evolutional Poems - Keebee (2004)
- Music - The Quiett (2005)
- Brainstorming - Fana (2005)
- Q Train - The Quiett (2006)
- Music Instrumentals - The Quiett (2006)
- Crucial Moment - Loquence (2007)
- Summer Madness - DJ Silent (2007)
- Poetree Syndrome - Keebee (2007)
- The Real Me- The Quiett (2007)
- Back on the Beats Vol.1 - The Quiett (2008)
- Mind-Expander - Loptimist (2008)
- Mind-Expander Instrumentals - Loptimist (2008)
- Devil (마왕) - Jerry.K (2008)
- 246 - The Quiett & Makesense (2009)
- Fanatic - Fana (2009)
- The Passage - Keebee (2009)
- Hommage - RHYME-A- (2009)
- School for Dummies - DJ Wegun (2009)
- Mad Clown VS Crucial Star - Mad Clown & Crucial Star (2010)
- Groove for Buddies - DJ Wegun (2010)
- Soul Food Maker - DJ Wegun (2011)
- Man on the Earth - Eluphant (2011)
- The Black Band - Loquence (2011)
- Anything Goes - Mad Clown (2011)

=== Digital releases/singles ===
- Next Big Thingz (2004)
- Keep It Underground Pt.2 - Planet Black (2004)
- 당신은 지금 어디쯤 와있습니까 - Syntax-Error (2004)
- 일갈 EP - Jerry.K (2004)
- 그 날이 오면 - Fana (2005)
- Walk in the Sky - Loquence (2008)
- Luv Sickness - Mad Clown (2008)
- Atomic Anatomy - DJ Wegun (2008)
- Back on the Beats 0.5 - The Quiett (2009)
- K-Bonics - RHYME-A- (2009)
- Never Q.U.I.T.T. - The Quiett (2010)
- Quiet Storm: A Night Record - The Quiett (2010)
- I Want U Back - RHYME-A- (2010) (주선 온라인 OST)
- Love Is Over - Loptimist (2010)
- Microsuit - Pento (2010)
- Catch Me If U Can - Crucial Star (2010)
- Supa Dupa Duo - DJ Wegun (2010)
- Full Speed Ahead - Fana (2010)
- Smoke - Vida Loca (2010)
- Put Your L in the Air - Loquence (2010)
- Someone Like You - D.C. (2010)
- You Never Know - Pento (2010)
- Speak The Truth - RHYME-A- (2010)
- Amazing Gift - Loptimist (2011)
- New Generation - Crucial Star (2011)
- A Star Goes Up - Crucial Star (2011)
- Harmony - Fana (2011)
- Chocoholic - Crucial Star (2011)
- Lilac - Loptimist (2011)
- Super Star - Eluphant (2011)
- She is Not Following You - Eluphant (2011)
- Still Beautiful (여전히 아름답네요) - Eluphant (2011)
- When I Feel Alone (혼자라고 느낄 때) - RHYME-A- (2011)
- Can't Go Out (옷가게) - Crucial Star (2011)
- She's There - Vida Loca (2011)
- Champagne - Crucial Star (2011)
