= Kusan: City of Wolves =

2026 video game

- Developer: CIRCLEfromDOT
- Publisher: PQube
- Composer: Loptimist
- Engine: Unity
- Platforms: Windows; Xbox Series X/S; PlayStation 5; Nintendo Switch
- Release: July 30, 2026
- Genre: Top-down shooter
- Mode: Single-player

Kusan: City of Wolves (Korean: 쿠산: 늑대들의 도시) is a top-down shooter video game by South Korean developer CIRCLEfromDOT published on July 30, 2026 by PQube for Windows, Xbox, PlayStation 5, and Nintendo Switch. The game features anthropomorphic animal characters and takes place in a fictional city called Kusan, a cyberpunk city with a neo-noir atmosphere. The player controls the main character, Jin, a feline soldier with a metal prosthetic arm ("War hand") which is used as a melee weapon. Jin is portrayed as an antihero who employs violent methods to enact his agenda.

The game uses a pixel art style, and has been compared to Hotline Miami for both the art style and gameplay. Gore, drug use, sex trafficking, and crime are all common themes throughout, with the levels featuring elements of clutter lending to the overall dystopic cyberpunk and neo-noir aesthetic. It features comic-book style cutscenes which are displayed one panel at a time with player input, and a hip-hop soundtrack by South Korean rapper Loptimist.

The game was developed over eight years by a small team, and was inspired by Hotline Miami and John Wick. It has been generally well-received by critics, in particular for the gameplay, soundtrack, and replayability, while some critics found the narrative lacking.

== Gameplay ==
The gameplay is level-based, in which the player clears each section of enemies before proceeding to the next area. After each area, the player is presented with a score panel before moving on, with a score ranging from C up to SS, scoring the player's performance on time, kills, combo, style, bravery, parry, and a bonus score. The scorecard must be dismissed prior to advancing to the next area, with some doors being temporarily indestructible until the scorecard is dismissed. The player can also choose to replay an area to improve their score instead of proceeding.

Levels feature end bosses which must be defeated to continue. The player dies after a single hit, requiring careful planning. After dying, the player is respawned at the start of the current floor, enabling rapid attempts at clearing it, a design element shared with Hotline Miami. Gameplay includes melee and ranged combat, as well as dodging, blocking, and parrying, and destructible elements including furniture, props, and doors. Items blocking doors must be destroyed before proceeding, and doors can be attacked, killing enemies who are near them.

Nimo, a deer, is responsible for upgrading the player's weapons and managing the loadout in-between levels.

The default weapon is the playable character Jin's prosthetic arm, referred to as the "War hand", which instantly kills nearby enemies. Ranged weapons include the throwable "quantum blade", which has a short range, as well as various unlockable firearms which can be upgraded using the in-game currency, "bolts", which are picked up during gameplay by a reindeer NPC named Nimo at gun-runner Mido's front, a laundromat which the player visits in-between levels. The game uses a grid-based inventory system, requiring the player to carefully manage their inventory to optimize usage.

== Development ==
Kusan's development started in 2018, and it took around eight years to complete. CIRCLEfromDOT CEO and designer Yeom Jeong-gyu (염정규) stated in an interview with Inven Global that the development team started out with four people, was eventually reduced to two, and that the main character, Jin, was inspired by John Wick. The "quantum knife" also shares the same inspiration. Yeom also noted Hideo Kojima, Satoru Iwata, and Shigeru Miyamoto as inspirations for his work. Yeom stated that the team's intent was for levels to play out as a form of "puzzle".

The name of the game's city, Kusan, is based on the location of the developer's headquarters, Busan. Kusan draws inspiration from various other Asian cities, including Hong Kong and Tokyo.

Yeom reached out to the soundtrack artist Loptimist in 2018 via Instagram, initially expecting that he would be unable to obtain a contract with him, but Loptimist agreed and provided several tracks from his existing discography for the game. A demo was released on March 17, 2026.

=== Design ===
The decision to portray the characters in the game as animals stems from creator Yeom Jeong-gyu's desire to counterbalance the game's violence and make it more "light-hearted", as well as to help with emotive expression and to help make "... the whole city feel like a kind of jungle." The subtitle "City of Wolves" is drawn from the French idiom l'heure entre chien et loup (lit. 'the hour between dog and wolf'), referring to twilight, or a time during which it can be difficult to tell a dog from a wolf.

The game features a mixture of retro pixel art augmented with modern lighting elements, and the developer focused especially on visibility and contrast during the design process. The choice of neon lighting was heavily influenced by John Wick. Playtesting led to the inclusion of optional aim assist, as testers noted difficulty in aiming while using a controller. The AI elements were tweaked in development to maintain a high level of difficulty.

The design of the cutscenes throughout the game was influenced by Remedy Entertainment's 2001 shooter Max Payne, with the developer preferring a style reminiscent of comic books rather than videos.

The game features 54 levels at launch.

== Reception ==
Reception

Aggregate scores
Aggregator	Score
Metacritic	79/100 (Note: Based on 10 reviews)
OpenCritic	87% recommend (Note: Based on 27 reviews)

Kusan: City of Wolves has been generally well-received, carrying a score of 80 out of 100 based on critic reviews on review aggregator Metacritic. Fellow review aggregator OpenCritic assessed that the game received strong approval, being recommended by 87% of critics. Checkpoint Gaming writer Lisa Pollifroni gave the game a score of 7 out of 10, complimenting the art style, gameplay, and soundtrack and noting that the game is highly replayable, while the story is "confusing and not successfully integrated", and that the game can be challenging. Pollifroni also listed the game's similarity to Hotline Miami as a detriment.

Gamereactor's Jarno Varesmaa gave the game a score of 8 out of 10, also comparing it to Hotline Miami, and complimented the gameplay and soundtrack, while stating that the "narrative and dialogue fall flat right up until the final act." A 4.5 out of 5 review by Dutch publication Gameliner also points out the soundtrack as a strength, while also noting that it is less impactful when compared to Hotline Miami.
