= Do It for the Fans =

Mixtape by Dok2
- Released: November 15, 2011
- Genres: Hip hop, rap, Korean hip hop
- Languages: Korean, English
- Label: Illionaire Records
- Producers: Dok2, The Quiett, Beenzino

Dok2 chronology
Hustle Real Hard (2011)	Do It for the Fans (2011)	Love & Life, The Album (2012)

Professional ratings
Review scores
Source	Rating
Wakesidevision	3/5 stars

Do It for the Fans is Dok2's latest mixtape which was released on November 15, 2011. This mixtape was released under Dok2's own independent Korean hip hop label, Illionaire Records, which he formed with Beenzino and The Quiett.

== Production ==
The album consists of twelve tracks, eight of which were produced by Dok2 himself. The mixtape had many other producers. These include AOM's Cha Cha Malone, Illionaire Records' The Quiett, and also Shimmy Twice. It also features many R&B and Korean hip hop artists. These include The Quiett, B-Free, Paloalto and Zion.T.

== Track listing ==
No.	Title	Length
1.	"Intro"
2.	"Still Here 2011"
3.	"Young King Young Boss (Feat. Zion.T)"
4.	"This Is What I Do"
5.	"Blah Blah Blah"
6.	"Let It Go [Remix] (Feat. Cha Cha Malone)"
7.	"How I Do"
8.	"Bangin' With This"
9.	"Hilite & Illionaire (Feat. B-Free, Paloalto & The Quiett)"
10.	"Always Awake [Remix] (Feat. The Quiett)"
11.	"Til My Time Gets Over"
12.	"그쯤에서 해 (Feat. Beenzino & The Quiett)"
