= Love & Life, The Album =

Studio album by Dok2
- Released: Digital download: February 24, 2012; CD: February 28, 2012
- Genre: Hip hop, rap, Korean hip hop
- Length: 40.58 mins
- Language: Korean, English
- Label: Illionaire Records; Genuine Music/Hiphop Playa
- Producer: Dok2, Rado, Prima Vista

Dok2 chronology
| Do It for the Fans (2011) | Love & Life, The Album (2012) | Hustle Real Hard (2012) |

Love & Life, The Album is Dok2's latest album which was released on February 24, 2012. The first single from the album is "Love & Life", which features Rado, who is also one of the main producers for the album. This album was released under Dok2's very own independent Korean hip hop label, Illionaire Records, which had a joint formation alongside The Quiett.

What makes this album incredible is the aggressive side to Korean hip hop, which Dok2 portrays himself in. Not just the aggressiveness, but also the delicate artistry of the album and the seriousness of it.

== Production ==
The album consists of eleven tracks, where nine of them were produced mostly by the young CEO of Illionaire Records, himself, but had many other producers, including R&B and Korean hip hop artists such as Rado & Prima Vista. The album also features many popular Korean hip hop artists, which include Rado, Zion T., Jinbo and Bumkey.

Dok2 has intended to show a different side to him, and has moved away from his "dirty, south" style of rapping, in the compilation. It was available digitally on February 24, 2012, and the compatible disc was released on 28 February 2012, four days later.

== Track listing ==
All lyrics are written by Dok2.

| No. | Title | Length |
|---|---|---|
| 1. | "Love & Life (Feat. Rado)" | 3:18 |
| 2. | "Best Time (In Our Life)" | 3:15 |
| 3. | "Let Me Love U" | 3:19 |
| 4. | "비밀 2 (Feat. Zion.T)" | 4:11 |
| 5. | "Plenty (Feat. Jinbo)" | 4:09 |
| 6. | "They Love Who?" | 3:39 |
| 7. | "Leave Me Alone (Fuck You)" | 3:48 |
| 8. | "Can’t Let You Go (Feat. Bumkey)" | 5:30 |
| 9. | "It’s Alright" | 3:32 |
| 10. | "Lonely Nights" | 3:49 |
| 11. | "어제 같은 오늘 (Here Today, Gone Tomorrow)" | 3:46 |
| Total length: | | 40.58 |

== They Love Who? \ Leave Me Alone (Fuck You) ==
It was revealed that Dok2's album is supposed to portray a softer side to him, but it is not clearly the case, as it is noticeable from the two tracks, "They Love Who?" and '"Leave Me Alone (Fuck You)". These two tracks sound like they contain a lot of arrogance, which suggests to us that he is trying to impress himself more than anyone else and gets a bit of satisfaction from it. This result was achievable due to the fact that there was admirable focus that was maintained. The structure of the two tracks has some sort of consistency and is rather lean. These two tracks portray pivoting characters, from sensitive, in "Leave Me Alone (Fuck You)", to threatening, in "They Love Who?", which moves on to portray his honesty.
