= Minos (rapper) =

South Korean rapper (born 1983)

Minos 최민호
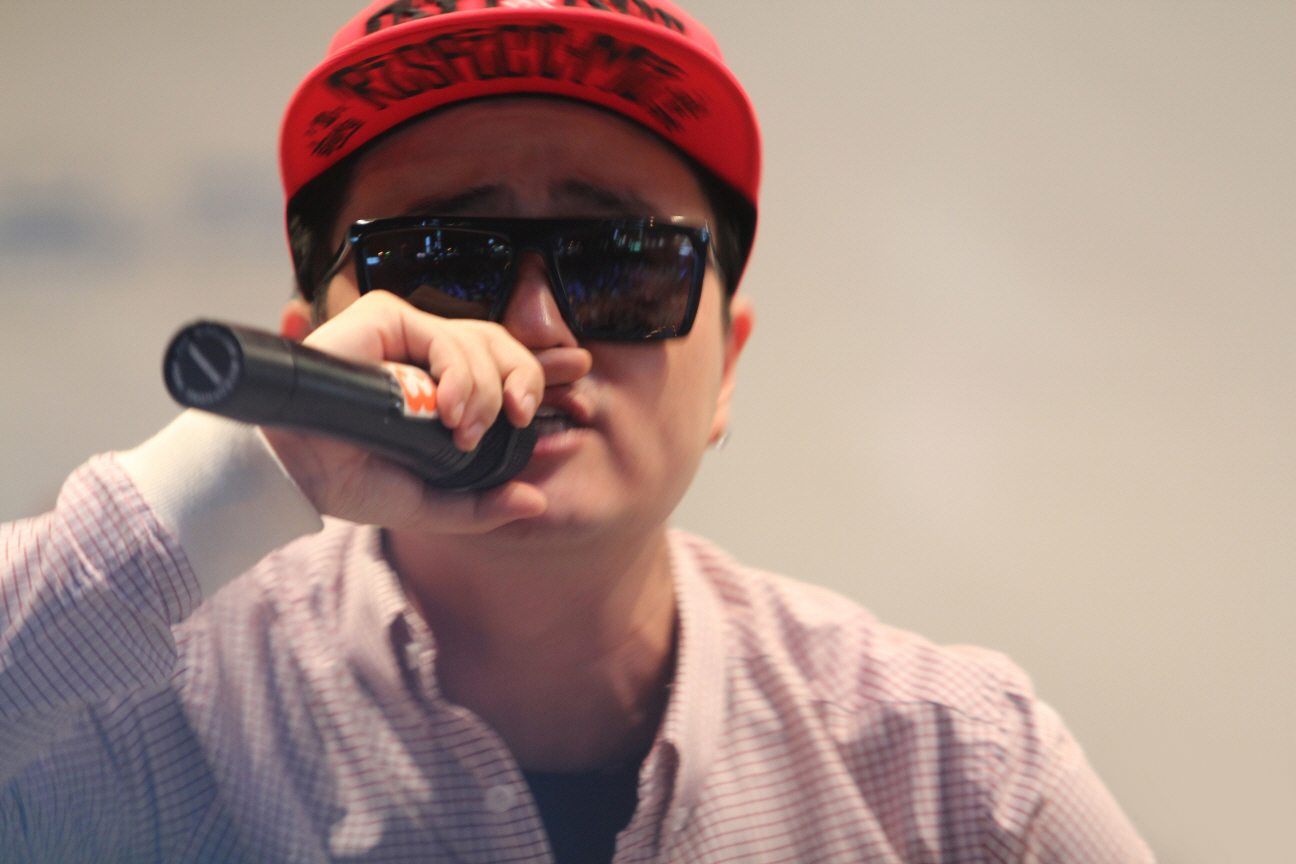
- Minos in 2011

Background information
- Born: Choi Min-ho; February 17, 1983 (age 43)
- Origin: South Korea
- Genres: Korean hip hop
- Occupation: Rapper
- Years active: 1999–present
- Labels: Soul Company; Brand New Music

- Minos
- Hangul: 최민호
- Hanja: 崔珉豪
- RR: Choe Minho
- MR: Ch'oe Minho

Choi Min-ho (Korean: 최민호; born February 17, 1983), known by his stage name Minos (마이노스), is a South Korean rapper. He is currently a member of the hip hop duo Eluphant, signed to Brand New Music.

== Career ==
Virus
Minos debuted in 1999 as a member of the Daegu-based hip hop duo Virus with the rapper Mecca. They released their first and only EP, Pardon Me?, in 2003. Virus disbanded in 2006 because of their mandatory military service obligations.

Eluphant

In 2006, Minos and the rapper Kebee created the hip hop duo Eluphant, whose first album, Eluphant Bakery, was released that year.

== Discography ==
=== Studio albums ===
Title	Album details
Ugly Talkin	Released: February 19, 2008; Label: Mastaer Plan Production, Mirrorball Music; Formats: CD, digital download

=== Collaborative albums ===
Title	Album details
Coffee Calls For A Cigarette with Soulman	Released: February 26, 2007; Label: CJ E&M; Formats: CD, digital download
The Lost Files with Artisan Beats	Released: July 7, 2009; Label: Luminant Entertainment; Formats: CD, digital download
Humanoid / Hypnotica (휴머노이드 / 힙노티카) with Nuol	Released: January 26, 2010; Label: Hiphopplaya; Formats: CD, digital download

=== Charted singles ===
==== Collaborations ====
Title	Year	Peak chart positions	Sales (DL)	Album
Title	Year	KOR	Sales (DL)	Album
"Slow Down, Girl" (운동화 사줄께) with Shin Ji-soo	2013	27	KOR: 80,172	Non-album single
"Little Boy" with JC Jieun	2013	78	KOR: 25,681	Non-album single
