= Jooyoung =

- Born: Kim Joo-young; March 9, 1991 (age 35); Cheongju, South Korea
- Genres: R&B, alternative R&B, pop, psychedelic pop
- Occupation: Singer-songwriter
- Years active: 2010–present
- Labels: RealCollabo; Belikewater Records; Starship X; sphere
- Website: Official website

Korean name
- Hangul: 김주영
- RR: Gim Juyeong
- MR: Kim Chuyŏng

Kim Joo-young (Korean: 김주영; born March 9, 1991), better known as Jooyoung, is a South Korean singer-songwriter. He debuted in 2010 and has released several singles and two extended plays, From Me To You (2012) and Fountain (2018).

== Career ==
Prior to his debut under RealCollabo, Jooyoung and his schoolmate Shin Dong-woo (who later debuted as B1A4's CNU) created a J&D duo for 2009 Chinchin Youth Song Festival. They had a band named 갭골 (Gapgol), and Jooyoung's nickname was 갭주 (Gapjoo).

=== RealCollabo days (2010–2013) ===
Jooyoung was first introduced to public through a cover of George Benson's Nothing's Gonna Change My Love for You uploaded on October 11, 2010, on RealCollabo's YouTube channel as RealCollabo's second artist. A month later he released another cover of Jeremy Passion's "Well Done". He finally debuted on December 7 with digital single "그대와 같아 (Same as You)".

On December 11, 2012, he released his first mini album "From Me to You" with self-composed song "네게 난" as the title track, which also marked his debut as a songwriter.

RealCollabo held its 'RealCollabo Live' concert, 'Siaena & Jooyoung RealCollabo Live 001' on January 18, 2013, at Hongdae V Hall. After this, he started guesting at other singers' showcases and concerts.

=== Leaving Real Collabo (2013–2014) ===
Jooyoung announced his departure from RealCollabo on April 4, 2013, via his personal Twitter. After leaving RealCollabo, he moved to Belikewater Records. He was featured on Lyn's song "High Heel", and guested on her showcase performing the song. On September 30, he released digital single "Popstar", produced by Jay Chong.

He made a guest appearance at the showcase of one of his best friends, Kim Feel, at DiDimHall Hongdae on November 28. He performed again in Kim Feel's first 'Another Concert' at Jazz Story in Seoul the following year.

Together with Go Hyung-suk, he helped B1A4's CNU compose the latter's first solo song, "음악을 취해 (Drunk with Music)", released on January 13, 2014. In the same year, Jooyoung and CNU teamed up with Jooyoung's former labelmate Cheeze and wrote "Drive", released on July 14.

=== Under Starship Entertainment (2014–2021) ===
On July 30, 2014, Starship Entertainment announced Jooyoung as their new artist under the Starship X label and released his cover of Jeff Bernat's "Call You Mine". He also made an appearance as Starship's team member in Mnet's Singer Game and became a hot topic because of his performance and eye-contact strategy.

He collaborated with former labelmate d.ear in writing "Taxi on the Phone" for Topp Dogg's Kidoh, released on September 26. His first release under Starship X was digital single "지워 (Erase)", a collaboration project with Sistar's Hyolyn, which featured Iron's rap from Show Me the Money season 3. Digital single "Erase" also contained a remake of his debut song, "Same as You". He then participated in Starship Planet's 2014 winter song, "Love is You".

Jooyoung performed in 'Starship X Concert' in Busan on August 16, 2014 and 'Starship X All Night Concert' in Seoul on December 5 with labelmates Mad Clown, Junggigo, Hyolyn, Soyou, and Nuboyz (Shownu, Wonho, and Jooheon of Monsta X, and #Gun). On April 4, 2015, along with Kim Feel, Mad Clown, and Hanhae he performed in 'Rolling Saypop Concert Vol.1 ELUPHANT Fly me to the moon'. On May 23, he performed on Greenplugged Seoul 2015. He also made a guest appearance in K.Will's 2015 Small Hall Concert.

Along with his labelmates, Jooyoung appeared on Starship's first idol survival show NO.MERCY as a guest judge from episode 6 to episode 9. In episode 9, his team won the fourth debut mission and got to release the song "0 (YOUNG)".

Jooyoung released single "91" for free on June 14, 2015, to celebrate his mother's birthday. On August 27, he released his third single "3", a double title track digital single. He also took part on collaboration with his old label mates Ra.D, d.ear, and Brother Su, releasing "Draw You". It is a remake of d.ear's old song which is also the last release of RealCollabo.

On November 26, 2015, Jooyoung enlisted in military service. Starship announced his enlistment the next month right after the release of "Love Line", surprising fans and public. He finished his basic training on December 24 and began serving as public service officer.

In spite of him still serving in military, Jooyoung kept releasing songs he had recorded before leaving for army. He still took part on Starship Planet's 2015 winter song "사르르 (Softly)". On January 7, 2016, he released his first soundtrack "들리나요 (Can You Hear Me)" for SBS drama Remember: War of the Son. On February 14, 2016, Jooyoung along with K.Will, Junggigo, and Brother Su, released a special Valentine song, "요리좀해요 (Cook for Love)".

In early 2018, Jooyoung completed his mandatory military service and returned to Starship Entertainment. On March 2, 2018, Jooyoung released a mini-album, Fountain, as a surprise to announce he had completed his service.

From April 2018 to May 2018, Jooyoung was a contestant on the Mnet show Breakers. He was eliminated in the semi-finals.

On September 4, 2018, Jooyoung released a double single which contained two songs, “N/A” and “Inn”.

On May 31, 2019, Jooyoung released a single, "Lost". On June 30, 2019, Jooyoung released a single "아름 (Pure Happiness)" which included three songs: "Wipe It Up", "Pure Happiness (아름) (Feat. George)" and "Samchong View (삼청 View) (Feat. pH-1)".

On December 17, 2021, Starship announced that Jooyoung was leaving the label.

=== Independent Artist Career (2023-Present) ===
In January 2024, Jooyoung released his first full-length album, Sphere, an all-English album that featured his signature blend of R&B, hip-hop, rock, and electronic music.

== Discography ==
=== Extended plays ===
Title	Album details	Peak chart positions	Sales
Title	Album details	KOR	Sales
From Me to You	Released: December 11, 2012; Label: RealCollabo; Format: CD, Digital download	—	—N/a
Fountain	Released: March 2, 2018; Label: Starship Entertainment; Format: CD, Digital download	75	—N/a
Pure Happiness	Released: June 30, 2019; Label: Starship Entertainment	—	—N/a
"—" denotes release did not chart.

=== Singles ===
Title	Year	Peak chart positions	Album
Title	Year	KOR Gaon	Album
As lead artist
"Same As You" (그대와 같아)	2010	—	Non-album single
"All Of You"	2012	—	From Me to You
"From Me To You" (네게 난)	2012	—	From Me to You
"Popstar" (팝스타)	2013	—	Non-album single
"Downtown Love" feat. Whale & Mad Clown	2015	—	3 single album
"Wet" feat. Superbee	2015	—	3 single album
"Dive"	2018	—	Fountain
"Prada" feat. pH-1	2018	—	Non-album singles
"N/A"	2018	—	Non-album singles
"Lost"	2019	—	Non-album singles
"Pure Happiness" (아름) feat. George	2019	—	Non-album singles
Collaborations
"Erase" (지워) with Hyolyn feat. Iron	2014	9	Non-album single
"Love Is You" with Starship Planet	2014	10	Starship Planet 2014
"0 (Young)" with Giriboy & Mad Clown feat. No Mercy	2015	71	NO.MERCY Part 3
"Draw You" (너를 그리다) with Ra.D, d.ear & Brother Su	2015	25	Non-album single
"Softly" (사르르) with Starship Planet	2015	24	Starship Planet 2015
"Love Line" with Hyolyn & Bumkey	2015	27	Non-album singles
"Cook for Love" (요리좀해요) with K.Will, Junggigo & Brother Su	2016	23	Non-album singles
As featured artist
"I Shouldn't Have Gone" (가지말걸 그랬어) Kim Jin-pyo feat. Jooyoung	2011	39	JP6
"You & Me" (심상치 않아) Kisum feat. Jooyoung	2015	34	Non-album single
"AIA" Crucial Star feat. Jooyoung	2015	—	Boyhood
"Baby" Primary (musician) feat. Jooyoung	2017	—	Shininryu (신인류)
"Daydream" ANDN feat. Jooyoung	2018	—	Dreaming Pool
"Tree Only Look at You" (너의 나무) Heize feat. Jooyoung	2019	—	She's Fine
"Question" Thama feat. Jooyoung	2019	—	Pre
"Layin' Low" Hyolyn feat. Jooyoung	2022	—	Ice
"—" denotes release did not chart.

=== Soundtrack appearances ===
Title	Year	Album
"Can You Hear Me?" (들리나요)	2016	Remember: War of the Son
"I'll do it every day" (매일매일 그리울거야)	2018	Wok of Love
"Here We Are" (나의 오늘이 너의 오늘을 만나)	2020	Find Me in Your Memory

=== Works as songwriter ===
Year	Title	Artist	Album	Role
2012	"Take a Breath"	Himself	From Me to You	Co-producer, co-arranger
2012	"All of You"	Himself	From Me to You	Co-producer, co-arranger
2012	"Hang Up the Phone"	Himself	From Me to You	Co-producer
2012	"From Me to You"	Himself	From Me to You	Lyricist, producer, arranger
2012	"Hang Up the Phone (Rap Ver.)"	Himself	From Me to You	Co-producer
2013	"High Heel"	Lyn	Le Grand Bleu	Co-lyricist, co-producer
2013	"Popstar"	Himself	Non-album single	Co-lyricist, co-producer
2014	"Drunk With Music"	CNU	Who Am I	Co-producer
2014	"Drive"	B1A4	Solo Day	Co-producer
2014	"Taxi On the Phone"	Kidoh	Small Album	Co-producer
2014	"Erase"	Hyolyn & Himself	Non-album single	Co-lyricist
2015	"0 (Young)"	Giriboy, Mad Clown, Jooyoung, Jooheon, Kihyun, Wonho, I.M, Seokwon	NO.MERCY, Pt. 2	Co-lyricist, co-producer
2015	"Evening Primrose"	Eluphant	Man On the Moon	Co-producer
2015	"You & I"	Kisum & Himself	Non-album single	Co-lyricist
2015	"Downtown Love"	Himself	3	Co-lyricist, co-producer
2015	"Wet"	Himself	3	Co-lyricist
2017	"Baby"	Primary feat. Himself	Shininryu (신인류)	Co-lyricist, co-producer
2017	"Where Are You Now"	Kim Yeong-Geun (김영근)	Under Wall Road (아랫담길)	Co-producer
2018	"Daydream"	Himself	Fountain	Co-lyricist, co-composer
2018	"Dive"	Himself	Fountain	Co-lyricist, co-composer
2018	"First"	Himself feat. Sole	Fountain	Co-lyricist, co-composer
2018	"Wine"	Himself feat. G.Soul	Fountain	Co-lyricist, co-composer
2018	"Planet Girl"	Himself feat. ph-1	Fountain	Co-lyricist, co-composer
2018	"Fountain"	Himself	Fountain	Co-lyricist, co-composer
2018	"Where Are We"	Himself feat. YEIN	Breakers Part 5	Co-lyricist, co-composer
2018	"Prada"	Himself feat. ph-1	Non-album single	Co-lyricist, co-composer
2018	"N/A"	Himself	Non-album single	Co-lyricist, co-composer
2018	"Inn"	Himself	Non-album single	Co-Composer
2019	"Just Friends"	GXXD (Girlnexxtdoor) feat. Goopy	GXXD	Co-lyricist
2019	"Tree Only Look at You" (너의 나무)	Heize feat. Himself	She's Fine	Co-composer
2019	"Questions"	Thama feat. Himself	Pre	Co-composer
2019	"Lost"	Himself	Non-album single	Co-lyricist, co-composer, co-arranger
2019	"Wipe It Up"	Himself	Pure Happiness (아름)	Co-lyricist, co-composer, co-arranger
2019	"Pure Happiness (아름)"	Himself feat. 죠지 (George)	Pure Happiness (아름)	Co-composer, co-arranger
2019	"Samchong View (삼청 View)"	Himself feat. pH1	Pure Happiness (아름)	Co-lyricist, co-composer
2022	"Layin’ Low"	Hyolyn feat. Himself	iCE	Co-lyricist, co-composer
2022	"Blurry"	SOLE (쏠) feat. Himself	Imagine Club	Co-lyricist, co-composer

=== Music Videos ===
Year	Title	Starring	Album	Video
2012	"From Me to You"	Irene Kim, Jooyoung	From Me to You	CJ E&M
2013	"Popstar"	Yeo Yeon-hee, Jooyoung	Non-album single	CJ E&M
2014	"Erase"	Takuya, Hyolyn, Jooyoung	Non-album single	1thek (원더케이)
2014	"Love Is You"	K.Will, Sistar, Boyfriend, Mad Clown, Junggigo, Jooyoung	Starship Planet 2014	1theK (원데케이)
2015	"Hide and Seek"	Mad Clown, Jooyoung	Piece of Mine	starshipTV
2015	"0 (Young)"	Giriboy, Mad Clown, Jooyoung, Jooheon, Kihyun, Wonho, I.M, Seokwon	NO.MERCY, Pt. 3	1theK (원더케이)
2015	"You & I"	Kisum, Jooyoung	Non-album single	1theK (원더케이)
2015	"Wet"	Bora, Jooyoung	3	1theK (원더케이)
2015	"Love Line"	Hyolyn, Bumkey, Jooyoung	Non-album single	1theK (원더케이)
2015	"Softly"	K.Will, Sistar, Boyfriend, Monsta X, Mad Clown, Junggigo, Jooyoung, Yoo Seung-woo, Brother Su, Exy	Starship Planet 2015	1theK (원데케이)
2018	″Dive”	Jooyoung	Fountain	starshipTV
2018	″Daydream”	Jooyoung	Fountain	starshipTV
2018	″N/A″	Jooyoung	N/A	starshipTV
2018	″Inn″	Jooyoung	N/A	starshipTV
2019	"Lost"	Jooyoung	Lost	starshipTV

== Filmography ==
=== TV variety shows ===
Year	Title	Notes
2014	Singer Game	Starship Team with K.Will, Mad Clown & Junggigo
2014	You Hee-yeol's Sketchbook	Guest with Hyolyn on Episode 252
2015	NO.MERCY	Guest judge for Episode 6-10
2015	Weekly Idol	Guest with Mad Clown and Junggigo on Episode 182
2015	Idol Star Athletics Championship	Running 60m & basketball (Gangnam Lakers Team)
2015	Kim Feel's Feelstagram	Guest with Park Kwang-sun of Ulala Session
2018	King of Masked Singer	Competed as "The Front" on Episodes 167 & 168
2018	Breakers	Contestant

== Awards ==
Year	Award-giving body	Category	Result
2009	CUVISM Magazine	Honey Voice of the Year	Won
