= Loptimist =

Loptimist (랍티미스트)
- Born: Lee Hyuk Ki; April 7, 1985 (age 41)
- Origin: South Korea
- Genre: Korean hip hop
- Occupations: Rapper; music producer
- Years active: 2004–present
- Labels: Soul Company; Jungle Entertainment; Kemistreet Records; Leestrument

Lee Hyuk Ki (Hangul: 이혁기), better known as Loptimist (Hangul: 랍티미스트), is a South Korean rapper. He debuted in 2007 with the album, 22 Channels. He signed to record label Soul Company in 2008 and left in 2011 to join Jungle Entertainment. Loptimist has been praised for "broadening the spectrum of the hip hop genre."

== Discography ==
=== Albums ===
Title	Album details	Track list
22 Channels	Released: February 24, 2007 Label: Tyle Music	1. "Intro"; 2. "New Vision"; 3. "Black Cancer" (feat. Dead'P); 4. "Ocean to Ocean" (feat. Unknown Prophets); 5. "눈물샘" (feat. 나찰 of Garion & 대팔); 6. "We the Real" (feat. Phebruary); 7. "85 Paradise" (feat. Sol Flower); 8. "Hard Hittin" (feat. UnderClassMen); 9. "Love" (feat. BlackLiszt); 10. "No Doubt" (feat. Deepflow); 11. "Dear.Unknown" (feat. Wimpy of 두사람); 12. "La Repondeur" - Interlude (feat. Deaf Switch & Toon); 13. "KO Is the Name" (feat. The Legendary K.O. a.k.a. K-Otix); 14. "Struggle to Rise" (feat. Sick Status); 15. "Nostalgia" (feat. Addsp2ch); 16. "Last for One" (feat. Baechigi); 17. "가난한 사랑 노래" (Loptimistic Remix) (feat. UMC); 18. "Illest Form" (feat. UnderClassMen); 19. "Coffee Break"; 20. "The Triumph" (feat. Simon Dominic); 21. "Like They Used to" (feat. D.Randle of The Legendary K.O. a.k.a. K-Otix); 22. "Keep On Rockin" (feat. SIDE-B); 23. "Hidden Agenda" (feat. Braille); 24. "Outro"
Mind-Expander	Released: April 29, 2008 Label: Soul Company	1. "Intro : K.O Blessing"; 2. "Triple Flow" (feat. 넋업샨 & RHYME-A-); 3. "Amnesia" (feat. Simon Dominic & Lady Jane); 4. "집시여행" (feat. 리쌍); 5. "One Night Dream" (feat. Blackliszt); 6. "이빨" (feat. Mad Clown); 7. "Ticket" (Interlude); 8. "Ticket to London"; 9. "널 사랑한 내가 밉다" (feat. 샛별); 10. "Coastal" (feat. DJ Wegun); 11. "금메달리스트" (feat. Leo Kekoa); 12. "갈증" (feat. P&Q); 13. "D.A.R.K" (feat. ARK (Tablo, Mithra Jin, Yankie)); 14. "Ghostwriter" (feat. Kebee & 경선 of Heritage); 15. "기다린 편지"; 16. "Dedicated to MC" (Bonus track)
Lilac	Released: March 10, 2011 Label: Soul Company	1. "남자의 멋" (feat. Loquence); 2. "자유로" (feat. Paloalto & Jinbo); 3. "다른 사람"; 4. "나를 불러본다" (feat. D.C); 5. "Coastal 2" (feat. DJ Wegun); 6. "생활의 달인" (feat. RHYME-A-); 7. "Sunshine" (feat. B-Free & Crucial Star); 8. "Boogie Night" (feat. Makesense & D.C); 9. "그때 우리는"; 10. "라일락" (feat. 김동희); 11. "연어" (feat. Eluphant); 12. "Lee on Your Mind"; 13. "Love is Over" (feat. Paloalto, Dead'P, & 남예지); 14. "Boogie Night Remix" (feat. The Quiett, RHYME-A-, & D.C)
Veranda	Released: October 31, 2014 Label: Kemistreet Records	1. "Veranda"; 2. "유부남 진" (feat. D.C); 3. "지나가던 길에" (feat. 김하얀); 4. "Echo"; 5. "씨" (feat. Carmine Ioanna); 6. "303 drum" 7. "잘됐어" (feat. 탁 of Baechigi, 지종환, & DJ SQ); 8. "Nest"; 9. "이미" (feat. Paxy); 10. "떠오름"; 11. "의심병" (feat. Teth & 지종환); 12. "Memoria"; 13. "Ma Day"; 14. "베개"; 15. "지나가던 길에 Remix" (feat. D.C)
Amazing Gift Vol. 3	Released: November 20, 2014 Label: Kemistreet Records	1. "L is Back"; 2. "의심병" (Inst.); 3. "음악가"; 4. "사돈"; 5. "퇴학"; 6. "지나가던 길에" (Inst.); 7. "연어" (Inst.); 8. "슬기로운 생활"; 9. "나를 불러본다" (Inst.); 10. "다른 사람" (Inst.); 11. "이미" (Inst.); 12. "라일락" (Inst.); 13. "다이어트"; 14. "자유로" (Inst.); 15. "오토노미"; 16. "감자"; 17. "벼락"

=== Singles ===
- "Love Is Over" (2010)
- "Amazing Gift Vol. 1" (2011)
- "Ma Day" (2014)
- "지나가던 길에" (2014)
- "의심병" (2014)
- "돌아보기" (2014)
- "다시는" (2015)
- "아르페오" (2015)
- "Me" (2016)
- "Seoul Bossa Nova" (2016)
- "Yam Scene" (2016)
- "Che Bella" (2016)
- "Early Bird" (2016)
- "Beat Language" (2016)

== Awards ==
=== Hiphopplaya Awards ===
Year	Category	Nominated work	Result
2007	Rookie of the Year	Loptimist	Won
2009	Producer of the Year	Loptimist	Won
