= The Quiett =

South Korean rapper

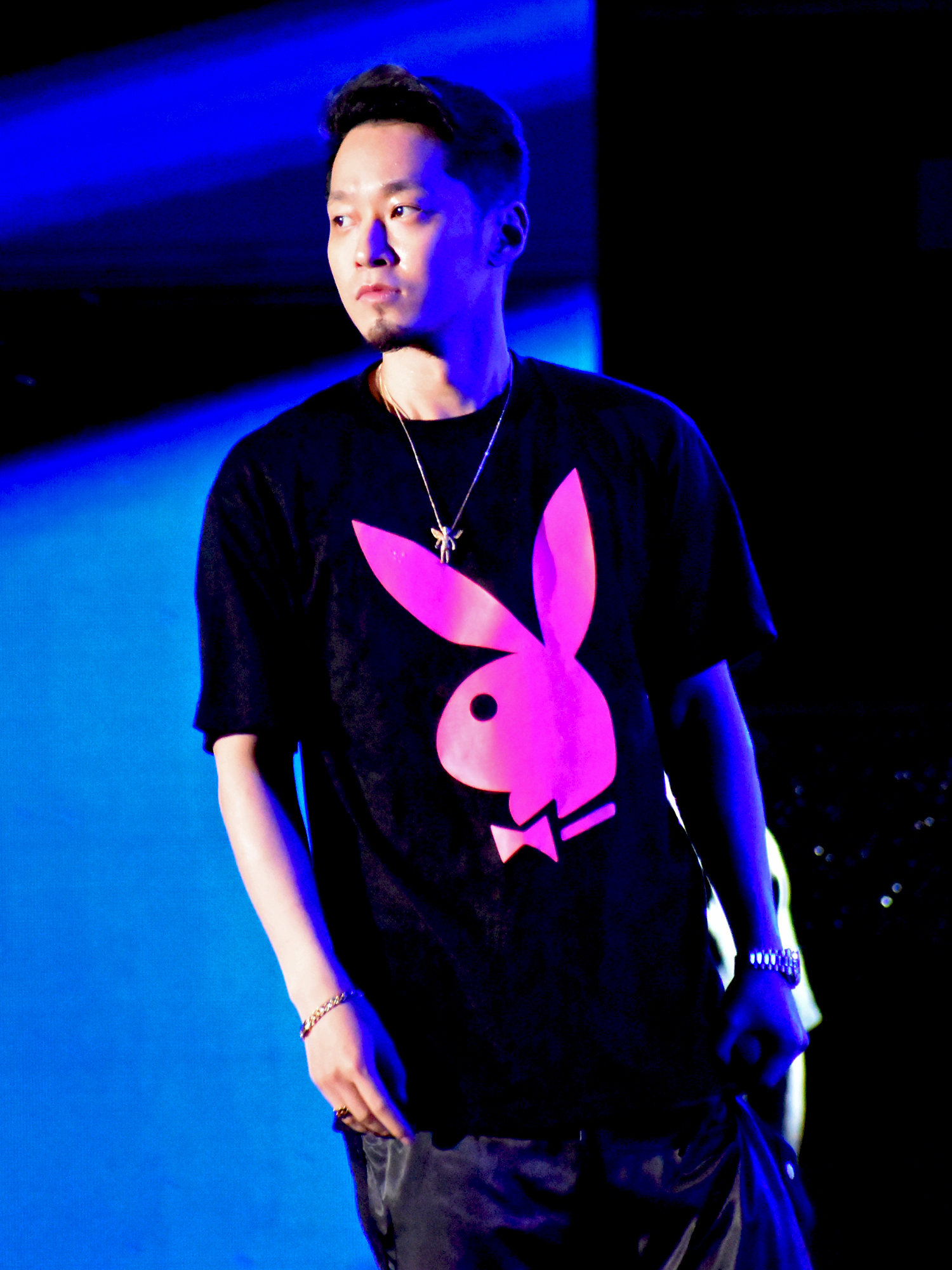
- The Quiett in 2018

Background information
- Born: Shin Dong-gab; January 29, 1985 (age 41); Gwangmyeong, South Korea
- Genre: Hip hop
- Occupations: Rapper; composer; lyricist; record producer
- Years active: 2003–present
- Labels: Soul Company; Illionaire Records; Daytona
- Website: illionaire.kr

Shin Dong-gab (Korean: 신동갑; born January 29, 1985), better known by his stage name The Quiett (더콰이엇), is a South Korean rapper, composer, lyricist and record producer. He is widely known within the South Korean hip hop community for founding several major hip hop record labels, including co-founding record labels Soul Company in 2004, Illionaire Records in 2011, and Ambition Musik in 2016, the latter two with fellow rapper Dok2. He founded label Daytona Entertainment in 2020 and has remained since after Illionaire Records closed its doors.

== Career ==
=== 2004–2010: Soul Company and indie popularity ===
In 2004, The Quiett co-founded indie Korean hip hop record label and talent agency, Soul Company, alongside rappers Kebee, Jerry.K, and several other artists. He released his first album, Music, the following year. In 2006, he released a solo album, Q Train, and a collaboration with rapper Paloalto called Supremacy. His 2010 album, The Real Me, went gold, selling 7,000 copies and solidifying his reputation as one of the most popular indie rappers in Korea.

The Quiett left Soul Company in 2010 to start a new label.

=== 2011–present: Illionaire Records, television appearances and Daytona Entertainment ===
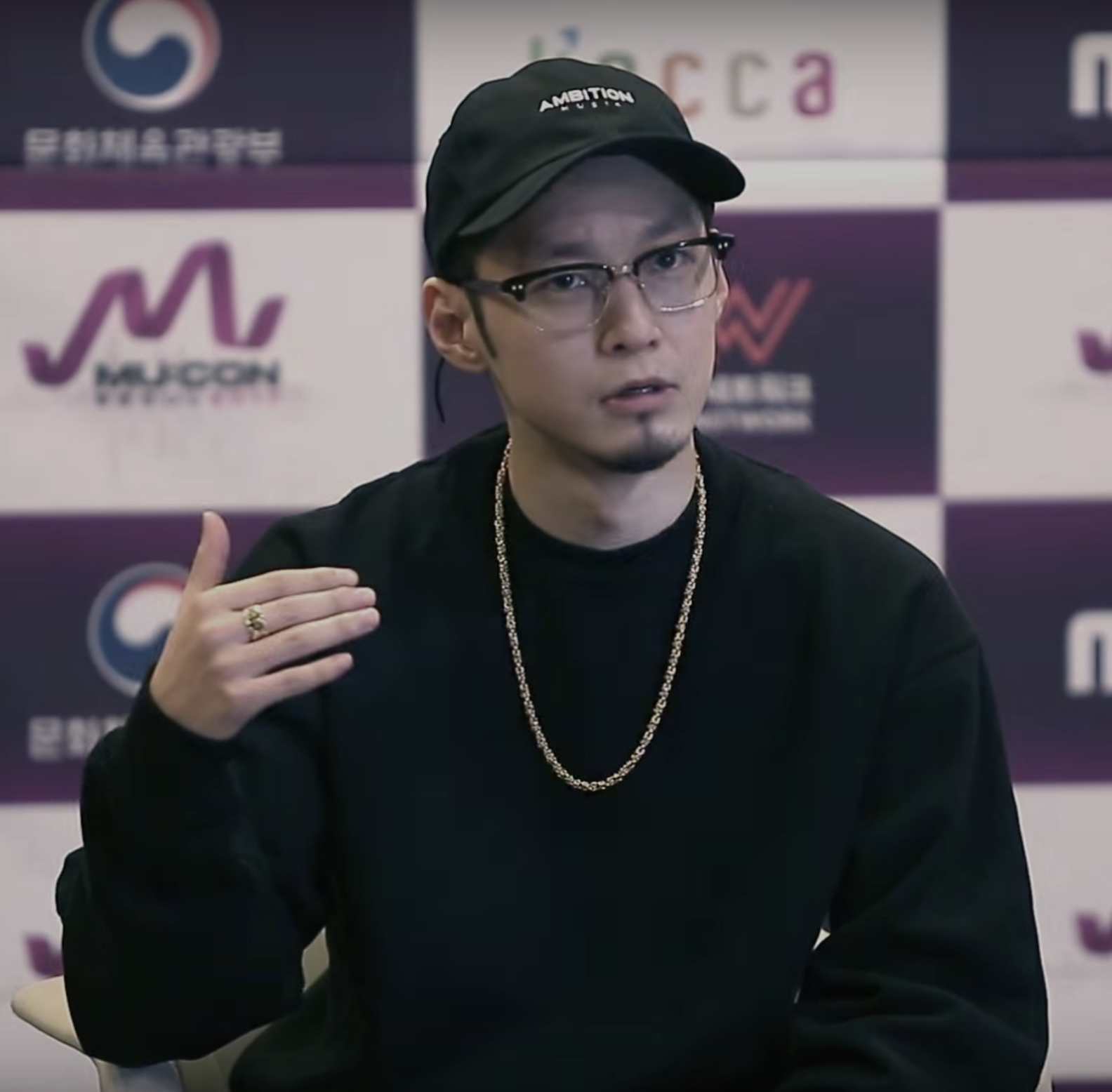
The Quiett in 2017

The Quiett and rapper Dok2 founded Illionaire Records on January 1, 2011. Rapper Beenzino joined the label later that year. The record label lasted for almost a decade in which they contributed to the rise of Korean hip-hop in the country.

The Quiett has made several appearances in popular Korean hip-hop competitions. He appeared as a judge on the third season of the TV rap competition Show Me the Money with Dok2 in 2014, taking first place with contestant Bobby of the group IKON. He reappeared in the show's fifth season with Dok2 and in the seventh season with Changmo. He also made two appearances as a judge in High School Rapper in season three with producer Code Kunst and in season four with Yumdda after establishing his new label Daytona Entertainment.

On July 6, 2020, Illionaire Records announced through their official Instagram account that their record label will close after 10 years of operation. and Twitter account. The Quiett was the sole artist signed at the time the company closed, as former artists Dok2 and Beenzino left prior to that year. On November 11, 2020, he released his final two singles "Bentley 2" which featured Yumdda, and Abu Dhabi which featured Skinny Brown, Leellamarz, and Sik-K as a tribute to the record company.

On November 25, 2020, The Quiett and fellow rapper Yumdda established their new record label Daytona Entertainment. He remains CEO of Ambition Musik, a former sub-label under Illionaire Records, although not an artist under the label.

== Discography ==
=== Studio albums ===
Title	Album details	Peak chart positions	Sales
Title	Album details	KOR	Sales
Music	Released: July 28, 2005; Label: Brownie Entertainment; Format: CD; Track listing: 1. "The Beginning" (Intro); 2. "Introduction"; 3. "Declare"; 4. "커다란 실수" (feat. Fana); 5. "섬"; 6. "상자 속 젊음" (feat. Paloalto); 7. "위대한 순간"; 8. "Take the Q TRain"; 9. "즉흥곡" (feat. Jerry.K); 10. "악몽"; 11. "Be Quiet" (feat. Kebee); 12. "Get Down"; 13. "소중한 만남"; 14. "더 나은 내일을 위한"; 15. "닿을 수 있다면" (Bonus Track)	—	—N/a
Q Train	Released: February 7, 2006; Label: Brownie Entertainment; Format: CD; Track listing: 1. "Go"; 2. "The Streets" (feat. DJ Silent); 3. "그 남자 그 여자" (feat. Cubic); 4. "대면"; 5. "Dolphin Dance"; 6. "Interlude" (feat. Mad Clown); 7. "Martial Beat Arts" (feat. DJ Silent); 8. "뭐" (feat. Notorious Kid, Friz & Pumkin Of Unknowndjs); 9. "Music"; 10. "Take the Q Train" Remix (feat. P-Type); 11. "City Cats"; 12. "뒤척임" (feat. Lee Byong-ho); 13. "Sunshine Luv"; 14. "다음에 만나요"	—	—N/a
The Real Me	Released: December 13, 2007; Label: Soul Company; Format: CD; {{hidden|Track listing|: 1. "More Introduction"; 2. "The Listening"; 3. "Punchlines"; 4. "뛰어가" (feat. Tiger JK, Jinbo); 5. "한번뿐인 인생"; 6. "매일 밤 03"; 7. "Keep Right" (feat. Loptimist); 8. "Give It to H.E.R." (feat. Leo Kekoa, Dok2, Simon Dominic); 9. "Shine Your Light" (feat. Verbal Jint); 10. "꽉 잡아" (feat. Jinbo); 11. "진흙 속에서 피는 꽃" (feat. MC Meta, Kebee); 12. "절대로 잊지 않아"; 13. "Love People, Love Music" (feat. T)	24	KOR: 3,317+
Quiet Storm: A Night Record	Released: March 11, 2010; Label: Soul Company; Format: CD, digital download; Track listing: 1. "Welcome to the Show"; 2. "Never Q.U.I.T.T."; 3. "Be My Luv"; 4. "Stars" (feat. Verbal Jint & Swings); 5. "Lonely One"; 6. "Q's Way" (feat. Venus); 7. "Game Theory"; 8. "Airplane Music" (feat. Basick, Rimi, Beenzino, Fana & San E); 9. "시간이 왔나봐" (feat. Dead'P); 10. "Old Records"; 11. "Love/Hate" (feat. Jinbo); 12. "Shine 'Em"; 13. "Be My Luv" Remix {{small(feat. B-Free, 'NUCK'넋업샨, Paloalto & Junggigo)}}	4	—N/a
1 Life 2 Live	Released: October 15, 2015; Label: Illionaire Records; Format: CD, digital download; Track listing: 1. "Bentley"; 2. "All About"; 3. "1 Life 2 Live"; 4. "World Famous" (feat. Dok2, Jinbo); 5. "Your World"; 6. "할렐루야" (feat. Beenzino); 7. "과연 누가"; 8. "Body 2 Body"; 9. "Montana"; 10. "My Life" (feat. Dok2, Beenzino); 11. "Lifetime"; 12. "Be About It" (feat. Babylon); 13. "Illionaire Way 2"	15	KOR: 1,540+
Q Train 2	Released: April 29, 2016; Label: Illionaire Records; Format: CD, digital download; Track listing: 1. "Slam Dunk"; 2. "Beat King"; 3. "Soul City"; 4. "Dope" (feat. Okasian, JustThis); 5. "Paper Chasers" (feat. DJ Wegun); 6. "Ride to Atlantis"; 7. "Martial Beat Arts 2"; 8. "Cool"; 9. "I Just" (feat. Notorious Kid); 10. "Very Special"; 11. "Love Letter"; 12. "Life of the Party"; 13. "Last Train"; 14. "Champion"	22	KOR: 850+
Millionaire Poetry	Released: May 18, 2017; Label: Illionaire Records; Format: CD, digital download	29	KOR: 901+
Glow Forever	Released: September 7, 2018; Label: Illionaire Records; Format: CD, digital download	25	KOR: 1,917+
"—" denotes releases that did not chart or were not released in that region.

=== Extended plays ===
Title	Album details	Peak chart positions	Sales
Title	Album details	KOR	Sales
Stormy Friday	Released: November 29, 2011; Label: Illionaire Records; Format: CD, digital download; Track listing: 1. "T.G.I.F"; 2. "Came from the Bottom"; 3. "The Real Me"; 4. "Mr. Lonely Part 1" (feat. Jay Park); 5. "우리들만 아는 얘기" (The Story Between You and Me); 6. "귀로" (feat. Jerry.K & Fana); 7. "Stormy Friday"	68	—N/a
AMBITIQN	Released: February 22, 2013; Label: Illionaire Records; Format: CD, digital download; Track listing: 1. "AMBITIQN"; 2. "The Greatest"; 3. "A Long Way"; 4. "Tomorrow"; 5. "Livin' in the Dream"; 6. "Get Dough" (feat. Beenzino); 7. "Gettin' Rich" (feat. Jay Park & Dok2); 8. "2 Chainz & Rollies" (feat. Dok2); 9. "1LLIONAIRE So Ambitious" (feat. Dok2 & Beenzino); 10. "Hotter Than the Summer"; 11. "Beautiful Life"	36	KOR: 617+
Q Day Remixes	Released: January 29, 2019; Label: Illionaire Records; Format: CD, digital download	—	—N/a
"—" denotes releases that did not chart or were not released in that region.

=== Collaboration albums ===
Title	Album details	Peak chart positions	Sales
Title	Album details	KOR	Sales
Supremacy (with Paloalto)	Released: July 24, 2006; Label: Brownie Entertainment; Format: CD; Track listing: 1. "Supremacy"; 2. "수수께끼"; 3. "내일은 오니까"; 4. "Love Evolution"; 5. "웃어넘겨" (feat. IF); 6. "지켜볼게" (feat. Dok2 & E-Sens); 7. "보여줘"; 8. "날으는 새처럼"; 9. "We Are"; 10. "Cold World" (feat. 강태우 aka Soulman); 11. "Life Goes On" (feat. Tiger JK & Tasha Reid); 12. "Imagine That"; 13. "고해" (feat. Koonta); 14. "못다한 말"	—	—N/a
"—" denotes releases that did not chart or were not released in that region.

=== Charted songs ===
Title	Year	Peak chart positions	Sales (DL)	Album
Title	Year	KOR	Sales (DL)	Album
Collaborations
"Air DoTheQ" (공중도덕) with Superbee, myunDo, Flowsik, Dok2	2016	5		Show Me the Money 5
"Rapstar (Remix)" with Flowsik, Dok2	2016	46		Show Me the Money 5
"Air DoTheQ Part 2" (공중도덕 Part 2) with Dok2, Superbee	2016	67		Show Me the Money 5
"I'MMA DO" (아마두) with Yumdda, Deepflow, Paloalto, Simon Dominic feat. Woo Won-jae, Keem Hyo-eun, Nucksal, Huckleberry P	2019	2		Dingo X DAMOIM (Part 2)
As featured artist
"L4L (Lookin' for Luv)" Bobby feat. Dok2, The Quiett	2014	7		Show Me the Money 3
"Don" Vasco feat. The Quiett, Dok2, Genius Nochang	2014	68		Non-album single
"Am I" (내가) Dok2 feat. Beenzino, The Quiett	2015	40		Multillionaire
"Entirely" (싹) Yubin feat. The Quiett	2015	67		Unpretty Rapstar 2
"Say Yes or No" (말해 Yes Or No) Zico feat. Penomeco, The Quiett	2015	3		Non-album single
"Worldwide" Jay Park feat. Dok2, The Quiett	2015	57		WORLDWIDE
"Rock the World" XIA feat. The Quiett, Automatic	2016	52		XIGNATURE
"Beverly 1lls (Remix)" Dok2 feat. The Quiett	2016	31		Non-album single
"Ambition and Vision" Beenzino feat. Changmo, Kim Hyo-eun, Hash Swan, The Quiett	2017	94		Reborn
"Inkigayo" (인기가요) Changmo feat. Dok2, The Quiett	2017	82		Gettin Money Moment
"Air DoTheQ Part 3" (공중도덕 Part 3) Superbee feat. Dok2 myunDo, Kim Hyo-eun, The Quiett	2017	88		Non-album single

== Filmography ==
=== Television show ===
Year	Title	Role	Notes	Ref.
2022	Show Me the Money 11	Producer	with Leellamarz	
