= Dok2 =

South Korean rapper

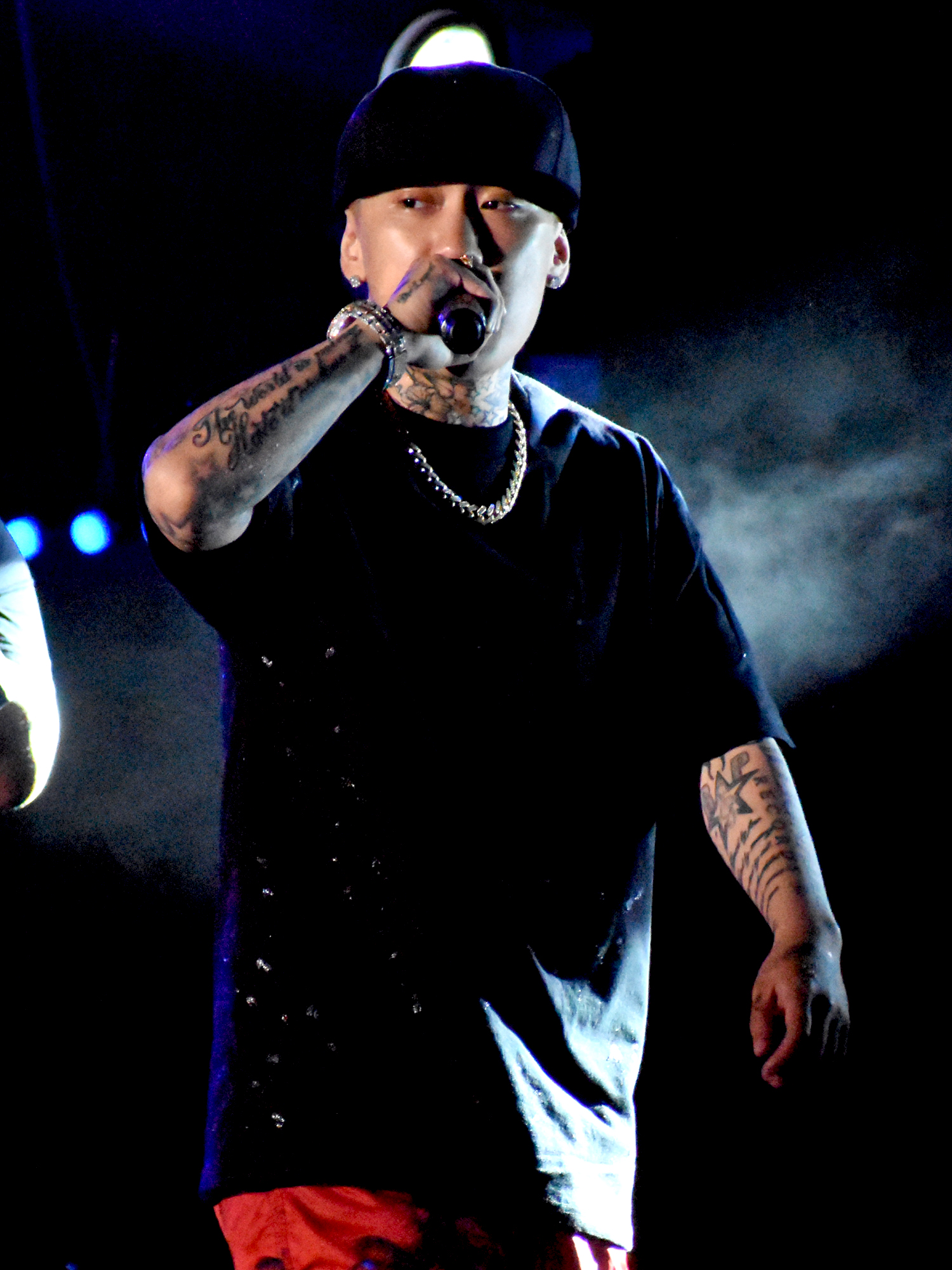
- Dok2 at the Busan Sea Festival, August 2018

Background information
- Born: Lee Joon-kyung; March 28, 1990 (age 36); Gyeongju, South Korea
- Origin: South Korea
- Genre: Korean hip hop
- Occupations: Rapper; record producer
- Years active: 2005–present
- Labels: Future Flow; Map the Soul; Illionaire Records; Yellow Money Records; Last Kings

- Dok2
- Hangul: 이준경
- RR: I Jungyeong
- MR: I Chun'gyŏng

Stage name
- Hangul: 도끼
- RR: Dokki
- MR: Tokki

Lee Joon-kyung (Korean: 이준경; born March 28, 1990) better known by his stage name Dok2 (Korean: 도끼, pronounced as Dokki), is a South Korean rapper, record producer and co-founder of now-defunct Illionaire Records.

== Biography ==
=== Early life ===
Dok2's mother is Korean, and his father is of Filipino and Spanish descent.

Media outlets reported in 2014 that he is a first cousin of Nicole Scherzinger, American singer and member of The Pussycat Dolls. Dok2 stated in a 2015 interview, "The report about me being first cousins with Nicole Scherzinger is wrong. We share the same blood, but the relationship is complicated. I haven't even met her."

=== Career beginnings ===
His first music appearance is when he was 12, when he performed "FEVER" with Jo-PD & Hype at the 2002 Mnet Music Video Festival.

Dok2 signed to Future Flow Entertainment when he was 13 years old. By the time he was out of his teenage years, he had written and produced songs for established Korean hip-hop groups, including Drunken Tiger, Dynamic Duo and Epik High.

In 2006, under the name All Black, Dok2 and fellow teen rapper Microdot released the album Chapter 1.

Dok2 released his first solo mini-album, Thunderground, under the now-defunct independent label Map the Soul, established by Epik High, 2009.

=== Illionaire Records and activity in the United States ===
In 2011, Dok2 and rapper The Quiett formed Illionaire Records. Despite its small size, Illionaire Records is considered one of the most influential hip-hop record labels in South Korea due to the popularity of its artists. He also founded sub-label Ambition Musik.

Dok2 gained mainstream popularity through his album Multillionaire and his single "1llusion," both of which peaked on music charts in South Korea. During this time, he also collaborated with several artists outside of the label, including GroovyRoom, G-Dragon, and Kim Junsu.

In November 2018, Dok2 resigned as CEO of the Illionaire Records and began activity in the United States. He announced the formation of the group "PO$TA BOY$" with Tyga in 2019 and ultimately left Illionaire Records on February 6, 2020.

In April 2021, Dok2 announced via his Instagram that he had signed with Tyga's Last Kings Records.

=== 808 Hi Recordings ===
In spring 2026, Dok2 revealed his years-long relationship with singer Lee Hi and the establishment of their co-founded label 808 Hi Recordings.

The pair released their first collaboration under the label, digital single "You & Me", on 28 March 2026.

In May 2026, the label announced its first world tour, set to begin in Asia and Oceania in August.

=== Show Me the Money ===
In 2014, Dok2 was a judge on the third season of the TV rap competition Show Me the Money, where he and The Quiett were the producers behind winning contestant Bobby of the band iKon. They again participated in the show's fifth season and were the producers behind Superbee, who came in third place. Dok2 again participated in Season 6 as part of a producer team with Jay Park (AOMG and H1GHR Music).

== Filmography ==
Year	Title	Network	Notes
2014	Show Me the Money 3	Mnet	Judge with The Quiett
2015	4 Things Show	Mnet	Himself
2015	I Live Alone	MBC	Himself (Episode 121)
2016	Show Me the Money 5	Mnet	Judge with The Quiett
2016	Infinite Challenge	MBC	Hip Hop Special with Yoo Jae-suk (Episode 506–513)
2017	Show Me the Money 6	Mnet	Judge with Jay Park
2018	My Little Old Boy	SBS	Himself (Episode 79)

== Discography ==
=== Studio albums ===
Title	Details	Peak chart positions	Sales
Title	Details	KOR	Sales
Illstrumentalz Vol. 1	Released: May 14, 2009; Label: Hiphopplaya; Formats: CD, digital download; Track listing: 1. 시작; 2. B Ma Friend (feat. Jinbo); 3. I Need U 4. Heartbreakin'; 5. Please; 6. Get Away; 7. Take My Hand (feat. D.N.G); 8. 헛소리 (feat. Willy Lee); 9. Dead Wrong (feat. B-Zion CJ); 10. Mystery Blues; 11. Fist Of Fury (feat. DJ Friz, Willy Lee); 12. Face 2 Face; 13. City Life (feat. Beenzino); 14. Crazy World (feat. Paloalto); 15. Gloomy Monday (feat. DH-Style); 16. Bittersweet (feat. Willy Lee); 17. I'mma Shine (Instrumental) (Bonus Track); 18. I'mma Shine (Remix) (feat. Mr. Gordo)	—N/a	—N/a
Flow 2 Flow (with Double K)	Released: January 25, 2011; Label: Hiphopplaya; Formats: CD, digital download; Track listing: 1. 시간이됐어 (Intro); 2. Takeover; 3. 21st Century Travelman (21세기형 나그네); 4. Hip Hop (La La La); 5. I Won't Lose (feat. B-Free); 6. Advice 2 (feat. Sean2slow); 7. Lost (feat. Park Seon Ju); 8. I'mma Die Legend (Interlude); 9. Die Legend 3 (feat. Tiger JK); 10. Break Beatz (feat. Rado); 11. Salute (feat. Bumkey); 12. 힙합 (Anthem Ver.) (feat. Beenzino, B-Free, Bizzy, Jay Park, Paloalto, Swings, The Quiett & Yankie)	—	—N/a
Hustle Real Hard	Released: April 19, 2011; Label: Hiphopplaya; Formats: CD, digital download; Track listing: 1. 1llionaire Begins; 2. It's Gon' Shine; 3. Goodday (feat. Bumkey); 4. That's Me (feat. Rado); 5. My Girl; 6. My Love (feat. Jay Park); 7. Don't Stop the Music; 8. I Am What I Am; 9. Never (feat. YDG); 10. Q.W.N.A (Questions With No Answers); 11. Hustle Real Hard (feat. Soulja Boy); 12. On My Way (feat. Zion.T); 13. Mr. Independent 2 (feat. Beenzino & The Quiett); 14. Come Closer/Flow2nite (feat. Rado & The Quiett)	—	—N/a
Love & Life, The Album	Released: February 24, 2012; Label: Illionaire Records; Formats: CD, digital download; Track listing: 1. Love & Life (feat. Rado); 2. Best Time (In Our Life); 3. Let Me Love U 4. 비밀 2 (feat. Zion.T); 5. Plenty (feat. Jinbo); 6. They Love Who?; 7. Leave Me Alone (Fuck You); 8. Can't Let You Go (feat. Bumkey); 9. It's Alright; 10. Lonely Nights; 11. 어제 같은 오늘	—	—N/a
Multillionaire	Released: June 23, 2015; Label: Illionaire Records; Formats: CD, digital download; Track listing: 1. 치키차카초코초; 2. Still Me; 3. 내가 (feat. Beenzino & The Quiett); 4. Multillionaire (prod. by DJ Mustard); 5. 111%; 6. Spirit Of Ecstasy (prod. by Jahlil Beats); 7. More Than Just A Girl; 8. 니가 없네 (feat. Junggigo); 9. Lie Down (feat. Mr. Gordo & Satbyeol); 10. Ain't Comin' Down; 11. We Gotta Know; 12. Still On My Way (feat. Zion.T); 13. Mr. Independent 3 (feat. Jinbo)	9	KOR: 2,691
Reborn	Released: March 28, 2017; Label: Illionaire Records; Formats: CD, digital download; Track listing: 1. Reborn; 2. Ambition and Vision (Feat. Beenzino, Changmo, Kim Hyo Eun, Hash Swan, The Quiett); 3. Rollercoaster (Feat. Joe Won Sun); 4. Hiphop Lover; 5. Plus 82 (Feat. Bryan Chase); 6. WTF (Who The Fuck); 7. 워럽(wattup) (Feat. Kim Hyo-eun); 8. In My Whip (Feat. Jay Park, Superbee, The Quiett); 9. On & On (Feat. Lee Hi); 10. Money Dance (Bonus Track) (Feat. B-Free, Bryan Chase, Okasian)	27	KOR: 960
"—" denotes releases that did not chart or were not released in that region.

=== Extended plays ===
Title	Details	Peak chart positions	Sales
Title	Details	KOR	Sales
Thunderground	Released: November 25, 2009; Label: Map the Soul; Formats: Digital download; Track listing: 1. I'm Back; 2. You Don't Know; 3. It's Me (feat. Joo Young); 4. Beyond; 5. Rob It (feat. Double K); 6. 64% (feat. Beatbox DG); 7. Last (feat. Mr Gordo); 8. It's Me (feat. Epik High & MYK)	—N/a	—N/a
It's We (with Rado)	Released: July 27, 2010; Label: Hiphopplaya; Formats: CD, digital download; Track listing: 1. Doin' Good; 2. 119 Bounce; 3. 비밀; 4. So Nice; 5. Try Again; 6. Doin' Good (Instrumental); 7. So Nice (instrumental); 8. Doin' Good (Remix) (feat. Jay Park)	—	—N/a
Crazy	Released: November 17, 2017; Label: Illionaire Records; Formats: Digital download; Track listing: 1. Good Vibration; 2. Thumb (feat. Kim Hyo-eun); 3. Crazy; 4. I Don't Know (feat. Hash Swan); 5. Vibe (Outro); 6. Crazy (Remix) (feat. Changmo)	—	—N/a
"—" denotes releases that did not chart or were not released in that region.

=== Mixtapes ===
Title	Details
Thunderground Musik Mixtape Vol. 1	Released: 2008; Track listing: 1. Intro (Ain't No Allblack); 2. Thunderground MC (feat. Dh-Style); 3. Don't Say Nuthin'; 4. 이한놈 (feat. Simon Dominic, Beatbox DG & DJ Qna); 5. Oznog & Omis (feat. Simo); 6. B-Side Rap; 7. Microphone Solo; 8. 방법 Shit (3MC PT4) (with Supreme Team); 9. Thunderground Movement Pt. 1 (feat. DJ Pumpkin); 10. Thunderground Movement Pt. 2 (feat. Double K); 11. Seoul, Yeouido (feat. 넋업샨 & Junggigo); 12. Thunderground Life (feat. DJ Friz & Jinbo); 13. Mindtap; 14. Thunderground 태도; 15. Lyrical Seduction; 16. Spittin' (40 Bars); 17. Thunderground King (I'm Takin' Over); 18. Thunderground 여의도 (feat. Born Kim); 19. Dub 다 20. Callin' Me (feat. Sean2Slow); 21. Nite (Inst.); 22. ★
Thunderground Mixtape Vol. 2'	Released: April 6, 2010; Label: Hiphopplaya; Formats: CD, digital download; Track listing: 1. Free #1; 2. Dub G 3. It's On (feat. Simo); 4. Hypnotized; 5. B-Side Rap 2; 6. Tonight (feat. MYK); 7. Smiles & Crys (feat. Tablo & Willy Lee); 8. Free #2 (GonzaBoy Sell'em); 9. 비스듬히 걸쳐 (feat. Juvie Train); 10. Girl Girl (feat. The Quiett & Rado); 11. Shawty (feat. Bizzy & J-Dogg); 12. Free #3 (feat. Beatbox DG); 13. 자유와 돈 (feat. B-Free); 14. 진지3 (feat. Hotclip); 15. Gonzo State Of Mind; 16. Thunderground King 2; 17. Rules (Skit); 18. Hurt
Rapsolute Mixtape, Vol. 1 (with The Quiett)	Released: August 15, 2010; Track listing: 1. Rapsolute Magic; 2. TFY; 3. Diss Diss; 4. 3단계 (feat. Swings); 5. iPhone Girl (feat. Crucial Star) (Prod. By G-Slow); 6. Baby Let's Go (feat. B-Free & Rado); 7. Mr. Independent; 8. Forthelife (feat. Paloalto); 9. Shorty You Should Know Better; 10. It's Q (Prod. By Dok2); 11. Tell Me If You Hear Me (featuring FANA); 12. Gone Home; 13. Girl Girl Remix (Prod. By G-Slow); 14. 7; 15. I'm Livin' (Shit Ain't Over)
Do It For The Fans	Released: November 8, 2011; Label: Illionaire Records; Formats: Digital download; Track listing: 1. Intro; 2. Still Here 2011; 3. Young King Young Boss (feat. Zion.T); 4. This Is What I Do; 5. Blah Blah Blah; 6. Let It Go [Remix] (feat. Cha Cha Malone); 7. How I Do; 8. Bangin' Wit This; 9. Hilite&Illionaire (feat. B-Free, Paloalto & The Quiett); 10. Always Awake [Remix] (feat. The Quiett); 11. Til My Time Gets Over; 12. [Bonus Track] 그쯤에서 해 (feat. Beenzino & The Quiett)
South Korean Rapstar Mixtape	Released: January 11, 2013; Label: Illionaire Records; Formats: Digital download; Track listing CD 1: 1. Intro; 2. Iongivafvck; 3. Hulk; 4. Illionaire Gangg (feat. Beenzino & The Quiett); 5. Rapstar; 6. Paranormal Raptivity (feat. B Free & Okasian); 7. Realest Shit Ever; 8. 100%; 9. Cap Tatt Jays (feat. Juvie Train); 10. Profile (G-Mix); 11. 9.0 (feat. Take One & Ugly Duck); CD 2: 1. So Real; 2. Never Die; 3. Came from the Bottom (G-Mix); 4. Get Dough (G-Mix); 5. Hunnit; 6. 즐겨 (feat. Beenzino); 7. Turnt Up; 8. I'm 1LL; 9. They Love Who (Remix) (feat. Beenzino & The Quiett); 10. Hotter Than the Summer (Remix) (feat. Beenzino & The Quiett); 11. Doin' Great (feat. Jay Park)

=== Singles ===
Title	Year	Peak chart positions	Album
Title	Year	KOR	Album
"I'mma Shine" feat. Mr. Gordo	2008	—N/a	Illstrumentalz Vol.1
"Take My Hand" feat. D.N.G	2009	—N/a	Illstrumentalz Vol.1
"It's Me" feat. Joo Young	2009	—N/a	Thunderground
"Fantom" feat. Beenzino	2010	—	Non-album single
"That's Me" feat. Rado	2011	—	Hustle Real Hard
"My Love" feat. Jay Park	2011	93	Hustle Real Hard
"Don't Do That" (그쯤에서 해) feat. The Quiett, Beenzino	2012	—	Non-album single
"Leave Me Alone (Fuck You)"	2012	—	Love & Life, The Album
"Best Time (In Our Life)"	2012	—	Love & Life, The Album
"Love & Life" feat. Rado	2012	—	Love & Life, The Album
"Hunnit" feat. DJ Dopsh	2012	—	Orange Revolution Festival Part 4
"Rapstar"	2012	—	South Korean Rapstar Mixtape
"Outchea"	2013	—	Ruthless, The Album
"Runnin' (Final Things)"	2013	—	Ruthless, The Album
"Handz Up" feat. Jay Park	2013	—	Ruthless, The Album
"We Gotta Know"	2014	—	Multillionaire
"Chikichakachokocho" (치키차카초코초)	2014	58	Multillionaire
"RIATCH"	2015	51	Multillionaire
"Multillionaire"	2015	49	Multillionaire
"Still On My Way" feat Zion.T	2015	76	Multillionaire
"111%"	2015	28	Multillionaire
"Future Flame"	2016	—	Non-album singles
"Bad Vibes Lonely" feat. Dean	2016	—	Non-album singles
"1llusion"	2016	5	Non-album singles
"Sprite On You"	2016	—	Non-album singles
"Beverly 1lls (Remix)" feat. The Quiett	2016	31	Non-album singles
"Just 1llin'"	2016	—	Non-album singles
"1ll Recognize 1ll"	2017	—	Non-album singles
"Ambition And Vision" feat. Beenzino, Changmo, Kim Hyo Eun, Hash Swan, The Quiett	2017	—	Reborn
"Rollercoaster" feat. Joe Won Sun	2017	—	Reborn
"Crazy"	2017	—	Crazy
"1llogic" feat. Chancellor	2018	—	Non-album singles
"Be the God"	2018	—	Non-album singles
"Bliss" feat. Sumin	2018	—	Non-album singles
"Ready to Listen" (들어줄게) feat. MK	2018	—	Non-album singles
"On My Way 3" (그곳에서) feat. Kim Bum-soo	2018	—	Non-album singles
"Watch Your Mouth" (말 조 심)	2018	—	Non-album singles
"Lobby"	2019	—	Non-album singles
"Marathon" (마라톤)	2019	—	Non-album singles
"So Far So Good" feat. Ann One, Double K	2019	—	Non-album singles
"Endxiety" feat. Ann One	2019	—	Non-album singles
"—" denotes releases that did not chart or were not released in that region.

=== Collaborations ===
Title	Year	Peak chart positions	Album
Title	Year	KOR	Album
"So Nice" with Rado	2010	—	It's We
"iPhone Girl" with The Quiett, feat. Crucial Star	2010	—	Non-album single
"21st Century Travelman" (21세기형 나그네) with Double K	2011	—	Flow 2 Flow
"We Here" with The Quiett	2011	—	Non-album singles
"Illionaire Way" with The Quiett, Beenzino	2011	—	Non-album singles
"Believe Me" (나만 믿어) with Taewan	2013	—	Non-album singles
"My Love (Piano Version)" with Changmo	2014	—	Non-album singles
"Rockin' With The Best" with The Quiett, Beenzino	2014	96	Non-album singles
"Finale" with Sojin	2014	30	Non-album singles
"Good Luck" with The Quiett	2014	98	Non-album singles
"Peep" (힐끔힐끔) with One, The Quiett	2015	—	Non-album singles
"Temperature Differences (Remix)" (온도차이 Remix) with Moonshine	2015	—	Non-album singles
"Goal Keeper" (골키퍼) with Microdot	2015	60	Non-album singles
"These Days I" (요즘 내가) with Highbrow	2015	—	Non-album singles
"Air DoTheQ" (공중도덕) with The Quiett, Superbee, Myundo, Flowsik	2016	5	Show Me The Money 5 OST
"Rapstar (Remix)" with Flowsik, The Quiett	2016	46	Show Me The Money 5 OST
"Air DoTheQ Part 2" (공중도덕 Part 2) with The Quiett, Superbee	2016	67	Show Me The Money 5 OST
"Paradise" with Jero	2016	—	Non-album single
"Like" (처럼) with Yoo Jae-suk, feat. Lee Hi	2016	7	Great Legacy
"Most Hated" (니가 싫어하는 노래) with Jay Park	2017	—	Non-album single
"S.M.T.M (Show Me The Money)" with Sleepy, Hash Swan, Olltii, Black Nine, Punchnello, Penomeco, Ignito	2017	82	Show Me The Money 6 OST
"My Way" with The Quiett, feat. Changmo, Kim Hyo Eun	2017	—	Fever Music 2017
"No Switchin' Sides" with The Quiett, Changmo, Kim Hyo Eun, Hash Swan	2017	—	Non-album singles
"WU & the 1LLY" with The Quiett, Kim Hyo Eun, feat. Inspetah Deck, Masta Killa	2017	—	Non-album singles
"We Bad" with The Quiett, Changmo	2018	—	Non-album singles
"Cali Shine" with Kim Bum-soo	2018	—	Non-album singles
"Life is beautiful" with VaVa, Yitai Wang, Jessi	2020	—N/a	Non-album singles
"Woke Up Remixx [Prod. by JAKOPS]" (XG featuring Jay Park, OZworld, AZLO, Paloalto, VERBAL, Awich, Tak, Dok2)	2024	—N/a	Non-album singles
"—" denotes releases that did not chart or were not released in that region.

== Awards and nominations ==
Year	Award-Giving Body	Category	Work	Result
2015	Mnet Asian Music Awards	Best Rap Performance	"Me"	Nominated
2016	Mnet Asian Music Awards	Best Rap Performance	"1llusion"	Nominated
