= Park Hang-ryul =

South Korean artist (born 1950)

- Born: 20 February 1950 (age 76); Gimcheon, South Korea
- Known for: Painting, drawing
- Notable work: The Dawn (새벽); Yearning (기다림); Daydream (낮 꿈); A Stare (응시)

Park Hang-ryul (Korean: 박항률; born 20 February 1950) is a South Korean artist famous for his paintings and poems. He held a total of 31 solo exhibitions and participated in more than 100 group exhibitions around the world including Korea, the United States, Japan, Belgium, England and many other countries. He is known for a portrait drawn in profile with a bird and flowers.

== Early life ==
He was born in Gimcheon, South Korea on 20 February 1950. He began to paint early in his life. However, his father, an economist, disapproved of him becoming an artist and sent him back to his hometown. He attended an agricultural high school where he began to paint again. There, he saw the beauty of nature, such as flowers blooming in orchards, that he was not able to see in Seoul. He captured the country-ness in his drawings. He also met his cousin, who influenced his future paintings, there. He spent much time with him, going to nearby mountains and lakes and reading books together. They became very close and their relationship continued when they both moved back to Seoul. Having returned to Seoul, his father finally allowed him to attend Seoul Arts high school. During high school, the death of this close cousin from a spinal lesion and the memory of being with her in the country became sources of inspiration going forward. After the arts high school, he graduated from Seoul National University in 1974. He received his master's degree in Painting in Hongik University in 1982. Since then, he has been teaching at Sejong University as a professor of Painting.

== Artistic style ==
He used to be an Informel artist using minimal forms and geometric abstractions. His style changed after his first poetical works were released in 1991. He unraveled his poetic sensibility to draw paintings with lyrical touches and concreteness. At the beginning of his career, he drew a boy with a buzz cut. After his trip to Mongolia, he was inspired by Korean traditional motifs and drew a girl wearing Hanbok (Korean traditional clothing). Since then, he has drawn many different paintings with a girl wearing Hanbok especially in a rainbow-colored one.

== Artistic themes ==
He was fascinated with Goguryeo murals. He often used imaginary animals from the murals such as a fish with wings, bird with human face, crow with three feet living in the sun and Pegasus. His cousin was also his inspiration, both herself and the memory of being with her in the country. Because her image went well with butterflies, flowers, fruits and birds, he often placed those in a painting of a girl. He also wanted to put the features of humans meditating, thinking, ruminating the memory together in his paintings.

=== Bird ===
To him, bird means existence of human soul. He draws sparrows and pigeons due to their closeness and familiarity to humans. The birds represent the human's inner side and partner in his drawings. Always, he draws birds sitting at the end of an object or a person. Even a butterfly and dragonfly are sitting at the end of a leaf. He depicts a bird sitting on a pole that connects to the ground and to heaven. In his travels to Venice and Paris, he realized the beauty of connection between humans and birds by watching a man feeding birds around him and a bird sitting on top of someone's head.

=== Flower ===
Of all the flowers, he draws the Japanese apricot blossom the most often because of the purity of its endurance. Instead of depicting details of flowers, he draws the image of the flower metaphorically. Just like birds in his paintings, flowers are located in the background.

=== Person ===
For him, drawing a person means drawing himself. So he only draws one person per drawing. In many of his works, they are portraits drawn in profile. He spends a long time on drawing the facial expression. He draws people in silence with their mouths closed. They express resignation, indifference and the absence of necessity of words.

=== Rainbow-colored Hanbok ===
From his inspiration of traditional Korean motives, Hang-Ryul drew his first painting of a girl wearing hanbokhanbok, entitled Rainbow-colored Hanbok (색동저고리). He realized that there was no artist who drew hanbok. There were some drawings of men wearing Korean traditional overcoat but not skirt and jacket. Since then, he has continued to draw a girl wearing hanbok especially in a rainbow-color scheme. It became his signature.
