= Eluphant =

South Korean hip hop duo

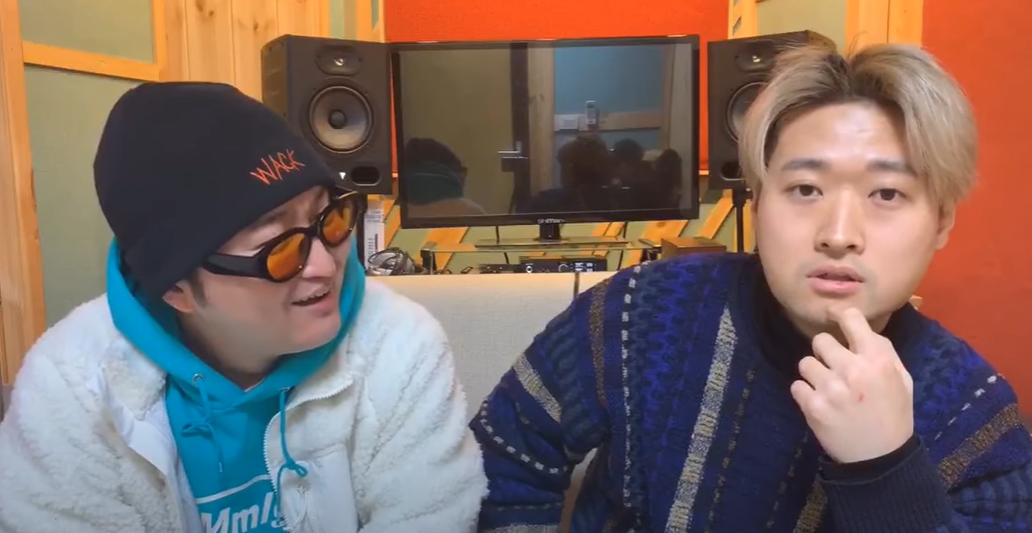

Background information
- Origin: South Korea
- Genre: Korean hip hop
- Years active: 2006–present
- Labels: Soul Company; Brand New Music
- Members: Kebee; Minos
- Website: Official website

Eluphant (Korean: 이루펀트) is a South Korean hip hop duo consisting of members Kebee and Minos. They debuted in 2006 with the album, Eluphant Bakery. They are currently signed to Brand New Music.

== Discography ==
=== Studio albums ===
Title	Album details	Peak chart positions	Sales
Title	Album details	KOR	Sales
Eluphant Bakery	Released: March 31, 2006; Label: Soul Company, Luminant Entertainment; Formats: CD, digital download	—	—N/a
Man On The Earth	Released: June 9, 2011; Label: Soul Company, LOEN Entertainment; Formats: CD, digital download	9	KOR: 1,797
Man On The Moon	Released: July 8, 2015; Label: Brand New Music, LOEN Entertainment; Formats: CD, digital download	20	KOR: 700

=== Extended plays ===
Title	Album details	Peak chart positions	Sales
Title	Album details	KOR	Sales
Apollo	Released: July 20, 2012; Label: Standart, Lomo, LOEN Entertainment; Formats: CD, digital download	40	—N/a
The Art of Travel (여행의 기술)	Released: May 16, 2017; Label: Brand New Music, LOEN Entertainment; Formats: CD, digital download	32	—N/a

=== Single albums ===
Title	Album details	Peak chart positions	Sales
Title	Album details	KOR	Sales
You Are Still Beautiful (여전히 아름답네요)	Released: May 4, 2011; Label: Soul Company, LOEN Entertainment; Formats: CD, digital download	12	KOR: 957

=== Charted singles ===
==== As lead artist ====
Title	Year	Peak chart positions	Sales	Album
Title	Year	KOR	Sales	Album
"She Is Not Following You" feat. Jieun	2011	63	KOR: 45,243	Man On The Earth
"You Are Still Beautiful" (여전히 아름답네요)	2011	63	KOR: 89,840	Man On The Earth
"Kidult" (키덜트) feat. Yoon Doo-joon	2011	95	KOR: 55,982	Man On The Earth
"Back To The Future" (미래로 돌아가자) feat. Ra.D	2011	97	KOR: 68,914	Apollo
"The Galaxy" (은하수를 여행하는 히치하이커) feat. Kim Feel	2012	—	KOR: 47,388	Apollo
"Crater" (크레이터) feat. Kim Feel	2015	—	KOR: 15,640	Non-album singles
"Lighthouse" (등대) feat. Kim Tae-woo	2015	94	KOR: 25,615	Non-album singles
"SimSim" (심심할때만) feat. Soyou	2015	60	KOR: 51,626	Man On The Moon
"Flowerpot" (화분) feat. Kim Feel, Jo Jung-chi	2016	—	KOR: 18,240	Non-album single
"—" denotes releases that did not chart.

==== Soundtrack appearances ====
Title	Year	Peak chart positions	Sales	Album
Title	Year	KOR	Sales	Album
"What Should I Do" (어떡하죠) with As One	2015	87	KOR: 23,073	The Man in the Mask OST
