= Jerry.K =

South Korean rapper (1984–2026)

- Portrait of Jerry.K

Background information
- Born: Kim Jin-il; January 26, 1984
- Died: April 27, 2026 (aged 42)
- Genre: Hip-hop
- Occupation: Rapper
- Years active: 2006–2026
- Labels: Soul Company; Daze Alive
- Website: Official website

Korean name
- Hangul: 김진일
- RR: Gim Jinil
- MR: Kim Chinil

Kim Jin-il (Korean: 김진일; January 26, 1984 – April 27, 2026), better known by his stage name Jerry.K (Korean: 제리케이), was a South Korean rapper and head of the hip-hop record label Daze Alive. He was previously a member of the hip-hop duo Loquence with rapper Makesense.

Jerry.K was born on January 26, 1984, and died from glioblastoma on April 27, 2026, at the age of 42.

== Discography ==
=== Studio albums ===
Title	Album details	Peak chart positions	Sales
Title	Album details	KOR	Sales
The Devil (마왕)	Released: July 2, 2008; Label: Soul Company; Format: CD	34	KOR: 2,454+
True Self	Released: November 7, 2012; Label: Daze Alive; Format: CD, digital download	—	—N/a
Reality, Enemy (현실, 적)	Released: September 23, 2014; Label: Daze Alive; Format: CD, digital download	24	—N/a
Emotional Labor (감정노동)	Released: March 15, 2016; Label: Daze Alive; Format: CD, digital download	33	—N/a
OVRWRT	Released: November 28, 2017; Label: Daze Alive; Format: CD, digital download	—	—N/a
"—" denotes album did not chart.

=== Extended plays ===
Title	Album details	Peak chart positions	Sales
Title	Album details	KOR	Sales
Ilgal (일갈)	Released: October 9, 2006; Label: Soul Company; Format: CD	—	—N/a
Love Story (연애담)	Released: February 3, 2012; Label: Daze Alive; Format: CD, digital download	—	—N/a
Love Story 2 (연애담2)	Released: May 3, 2013; Label: Daze Alive; Format: CD, digital download	—	—N/a
"—" denotes album did not chart.

== Awards and nominations ==
Year	Award	Category	Work	Result	Ref.
2012	Korean Music Awards	Best Hip Hop Album	True Self	Nominated	
2015	Korean Music Awards	Best Hip Hop Album	Reality, Enemy	Nominated	
2017	Korean Music Awards	Best Hip Hop Song	"Call Center" (feat. Oohyo)	Nominated	
