= Kebee =

South Korean rapper

Kebee 배이삭
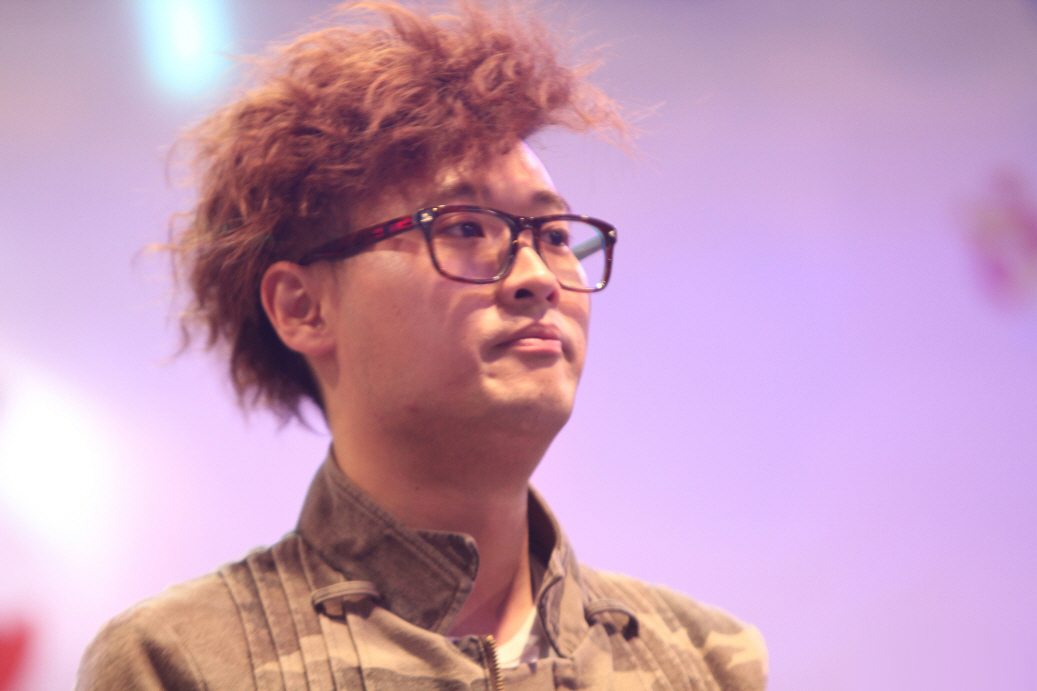
- Kebee in 2011

Background information
- Born: Bae Lee-sak; May 29, 1983 (age 43); South Korea
- Genre: Hip hop
- Occupation: Rapper
- Instrument: Vocals
- Years active: 2004–present
- Labels: Soul Company; Brand New Music

- Korean name
- Hangul: 배이삭
- RR: Bae Isak
- MR: Pae Isak

Bae Lee-sak (Korean: 배이삭, born May 29, 1983), better known by his stage name Kebee (Korean: 키비), is a South Korean rapper, songwriter and record producer. He is a member of Eluphant, and a former CEO of Soul Company. He gained attention in South Korea after appearing on Mnet's composition show Show Me the Money 6. He's since has contributed as a lyricist to albums released by Wanna One, IZone, Park Ji-hoon, and MXM.

He released his first album, Evolutional Poems, on October 19, 2004. In 2019, Kebee is the CEO and founder of Hi-Fly Music, a production company dedicated to "crafting music that showcases the individuality of artists." Additionally, Hi-Fly Music produces various multimedia content utilizing music as a central medium.

== Discography ==
=== Studio albums ===
Title	Album details	Peak chart positions	Sales
Title	Album details	KOR	Sales
Evolutional Poems	Released: October 19, 2004; Label: Luminant Entertainment; Formats: CD, digital download	—	—N/a
Poetree Syndrome	Released: October 8, 2007; Label: Soul Company, Mirrorball Music; Formats: CD, digital download	—	—N/a
The Passage (더 페시지)	Released: May 7, 2009; Label: Mirrorball Music; Formats: CD, digital download	—	—N/a
Lost & Found	Released: December 13, 2013; Label: C9 Entertainment, CJ E&M; Formats: CD, digital download	17	KOR: 700
Water	Released: January 27, 2017; Label: Brand New Music, LOEN Entertainment; Formats: CD, digital download	—	—N/a
"—" denotes album did not chart.

=== Singles ===
Title	Year	Peak chart positions	Sales (DL)	Album
Title	Year	KOR	Sales (DL)	Album
"Her Office" (그녀의 사무실) feat. The Black Skirts	2013	91	KOR: 20,093	Lost & Found
