= AOMG discography =

Record label discography

This is a list of albums released under AOMG.

== 2010s ==
=== 2013 ===
| Released | Title | Artist | Type |
|---|---|---|---|
| October 25 | "Call Me Gray" | Gray | Maxi single |

=== 2014 ===
| Released | Title | Artist | Type |
|---|---|---|---|
| March 19 | "Hold Me Tight" (감아) | Loco | Single |
| April 11 | "Metronome" (메트로놈) | Jay Park | Single |
| July 25 | "Nana" (나나) | Jay Park | Single |
| August 18 | "The Promise" (약속해) | Jay Park | Single |
| September 1 | Evolution | Jay Park | Studio album |
| November 28 | Locomotive | Loco | EP |

=== 2015 ===
| Released | Title | Artist | Type |
|---|---|---|---|
| January 28 | "Your Love" | Elo | Single |
| April 4 | "On It" | Jay Park | Single |
| April 7 | "Just Do It" (하기나 해) | Gray | Single |
| May 22 | "Mommae" (몸매) | Jay Park | Single |
| June 15 | "Want It" (원해) | Jay Park | Single |
| June 26 | "Whatever" | Ugly Duck | Single |
| July 14 | "Respect" | Loco | Single |
| July 17 | "My Last" | Jay Park | Single |
| July 28 | "Awesome" | Loco | Single |
| August 12 | "Simon Dominic" (사이먼 도미닉) | Simon Dominic | Single |
| August 21 | "₩ & Only" | Simon Dominic | Maxi single |
| September 24 | "Solo" | Jay Park | Single |
| October 27 | "Asia" | Ugly Duck | Single |
| November 5 | Worldwide | Jay Park | Studio album |
| December 24 | "A Piece of Cake" (누워서 떡 먹기) | Ugly Duck, DJ Wegun | Single |

=== 2016 ===
| Released | Title | Artist | Type |
|---|---|---|---|
| February 19 | "Friends With Benefits" | Elo | Single |
| March 8 | "All I Wanna Do" | Jay Park | Single |
| March 22 | "The Truth Is" (사실은) | Jay Park | Single |
| April 5 | "You Too" (너도) | Loco | Single |
| June 1 | "Like You" | Hoody | Single |
| June 15 | "Good" | Loco, Gray | Single |
| July 13 | Scene Stealers | Jay Park, Ugly Duck | EP |
| July 16 | "I Don't Disappoint" | Jay Park | Single |
| August 10 | "City Breeze" | Jay Park, Kirin | Single |
| August 17 | "Summer Night (Remix)" | Gray | Single |
| August 23 | "Tattoo" | Elo | Single |
| August 26 | 8 Femmes | Elo | EP |
| September 2 | "Me Like Yuh" | Jay Park | Single |
| September 7 | "Our Lives" | DJ Wegun | Single |
| October 12 | "Stay with Me" (곁에 있어주길) | Jay Park | Single |
| October 20 | Everything You Wanted | Jay Park | Studio album |
| November 4 | "Still" (남아있어) | Loco | Single |
| December 8 | "By Your Side" | Hoody | Single |
| December 16 | On And On | Hoody | EP |

=== 2017 ===
| Released | Title | Artist | Type |
|---|---|---|---|
| March 8 | "Hulk Hogan" | Jay Park | Single |
| April 3 | "Raw Sh!t" | Jay Park | Single |
| May 25 | Bleached | Loco | Studio album |
| June 30 | "Most Hated" (니가 싫어하는 노래) | Jay Park, Dok2 | Single |
| July 7 | "Love My Life" | Jay Park | Single |
| July 17 | "Yacht" | Jay Park | Single |
| August 18 | Summer Go Loco | Loco | EP |
| August 24 | "Hangang" | Hoody | Single |
| September 4 | "We Are" (시차) | Woo Won-jae | Single |
| September 7 | "Reborn" | Jay Park, Illson, Boi B | Single |
| November 2 | "Anxiety" (불안) | Woo Won-jae | Single |
| November 16 | "Can't Wait" (하나만 해) | Hoody | Single |
| December 10 | "Get It All" | Jay Park | Single |
| December 11 | "Birthday Gamble" | Jay Park | Single |

=== 2018 ===
| Released | Title | Artist | Type |
|---|---|---|---|
| January 17 | "Run It" | Jay Park | Single |
| January 30 | "Forget About Tomorrow" | Yulton, Jay Park | Single |
| March 14 | "Post It" (나타나줘) | Loco | Single |
| April 26 | "El Tornado" | Jay Park, Gray | Single |
| April 27 | "Golden" | Hoody | Single |
| May 1 | "Upside Down" (뒤집어버려) | Jay Park, Simon Dominic, Loco, Gray | Single |
| May 11 | "Gradation Vol.1" | Elo | Single |
| May 15 | "Gradation Vol.2" | Elo | Single |
| May 24 | "Lip Service" | Elo | Single |
| May 25 | "Soju" | Jay Park | Single |
| May 29 | "Osaka" | Elo | Single |
| June 10 | "Rain Bird" (비네) | Code Kunst | Single |
| June 15 | Darkroom | Simon Dominic | Studio album |
| July 1 | "Soju Remix" | Jay Park | Single |
| July 6 | "FSU" | Jay Park | Single |
| July 20 | Ask Bout Me | Jay Park | EP |
| July 25 | "Me No Jay Park" | Simon Dominic | Single |
| August 16 | "Bless" | Code Kunst | Single |
| August 28 | "Sugar" | Ugly Duck, DeVita | Single |
| September 10 | "V" | Jay Park | Single |
| September 13 | "Venom" | DJ Wegun | Single |
| September 20 | Band Wegun Effect | DJ Wegun | Studio album |
| October 8 | "It Takes Time" (시간이 들겠지) | Loco | Single |
| October 14 | "Balance" | Loco, Woo Won-jae | Single |
| October 22 | "Sunshine" | Hoody | Single |
| October 30 | "Simon Says" (왈) | Simon Dominic | Single |
| November 9 | "Finish Line" | Jay Park | Single |
| November 16 | "Cash" | Woo Won-jae | Single |
| November 22 | AF | Woo Won-jae | EP |
| November 22 | "Late Night" | Loco, Gray | Single |
| December 11 | "Home Alone" (나 홀로 집에) | Elo | Single |

=== 2019 ===
| Released | Title | Artist | Type |
|---|---|---|---|
| January 1 | "Finish Line Remix" | Jay Park | Single |
| January 8 | "XI" | Code Kunst | Single |
| January 15 | "Not The Same" | Ill Chris, Jay Park | Single |
| January 21 | "Absinthe" | Punchnello | Single |
| January 28 | Ordinary | Punchnello | EP |
| January 30 | "Pop Star" | JuniorChef | Single |
| February 7 | Hello | Loco | EP |
| February 22 | "Engine" | Jay Park, Woo Won-jae | Single |
| March 11 | "Taste" (호불호) | Woo Won-jae | Single |
| April 2 | "Too Late" | Code Kunst | Single |
| April 11 | "SS" | Woo Won-jae | Single |
| April 30 | "TMI" | Gray | Single |
| May 8 | "Tsugi" | JuniorChef | Single |
| May 17 | "K-Town" | Jay Park, Hit-Boy | Single |
| June 7 | The Road Less Traveled | Jay Park | Studio album |
| July 2 | Nothing Matters | Jay Park | EP |
| July 14 | "Meet Me When This Rain Stops" (이 비가 그치면 만나) | Sogumm, DJ Wegun | Single |
| July 16 | "23" | Punchnello | Single |
| August 13 | "Situation" | JuniorChef | Single |
| August 14 | "Dax4" | Simon Dominic | Single |
| August 21 | "Make Her Dance" | Simon Dominic | Single |
| September 3 | No Open Flames (화기엄금) | Simon Dominic | EP |
| September 6 | "Men In Black" | Ugly Duck | Single |
| September 26 | "Miro" | Hoody | Single |
| October 1 | "Domo" | JuniorChef | Single |
| October 15 | "Remember" (기억해) | Gray | Single |
| October 29 | Departure | Hoody | Studio album |
| November 7 | Odd | Elo, Penomeco | EP |
| November 11 | "Doodle" (낙서) | Punchnello | Single |
| November 16 | This Wasn't Supposed To Happen | Jay Park | EP |
| November 19 | "Forever 84" | Yumdda, Deepflow, The Quiett, Paloalto, Simon Dominic | Single |
| December 3 | "I'mma Do" (아마두) | Yumdda, Deepflow, The Quiett, Paloalto, Simon Dominic | Single |
| December 4 | "All About Us" | Code Kunst | Single |
| December 14 | "Take Me There" (데려가줘) | Gray | Single |
| December 24 | "J2B" (중2병) | Yumdda, Deepflow, The Quiett, Paloalto, Simon Dominic | Single |

== 2020s ==
=== 2020 ===
| Released | Title | Artist | Type |
|---|---|---|---|
| January 6 | "Run Damoim" (달려) | Yumdda, Deepflow, Paloalto, The Quiett, Simon Dominic | Single |
| March 5 | "Nervous Breakdown" (신경쇠약) | DJ Wegun, Fana | Single |
| March 6 | "My Taste" (내 입맛) | Dress, Sogumm | Single |
| March 12 | "Joke!" | Code Kunst | Single |
| March 19 | "Knock" | Code Kunst | Single |
| March 26 | "Digital Lover" | Gray | Single |
| April 2 | People | Code Kunst | Studio album |
| April 9 | Creme | DeVita | EP |
| April 25 | "All The Way Up" | Jay Park | Single |
| May 14 | "Moon Blue" | Gray | Single |
| June 5 | "Us" (우리) | Punchnello | Single |
| June 16 | "Cupcake" | Elo | Single |
| July 10 | "Submarine" (잠수함) | Hoody, Bronze | Single |
| July 23 | "Holo" (홀로) | Lee Hi | Single |
| August 11 | "Used To" | Woo Won-jae | Single |
| August 18 | Black Out | Woo Won-jae | Studio album |
| September 4 | "Somewhere" | Goosebumps | Single |
| September 18 | "Rhymesmith" | DJ Wegun, Fana | Single |
| October 5 | "Yayouhoi" (야유회) | Sogumm, Oh Hyuk | Single |
| October 9 | "10nstage Episode 6" (온스테이지 10주년-나에게 온 스테이지:6) | DJ Wegun, Paloalto | Single |
| October 14 | Some Time | Loco | EP |
| October 25 | "Zip" (함구) | Woo Won-jae | Single |
| October 30 | Everybody Sucks | Jay Park, DJ Wegun | EP |
| November 16 | "For The Gone" (사라진 모든 것들에게) | Code Kunst, Choi Jeong-hun, Simon Dominic | Single |
| November 26 | "Encourage" (위로) | Sogumm | Single |
| December 13 | Prison Break | Leellamarz, Goosebumps | EP |
| December 16 | "For You" | Lee Hi | Single |

=== 2021 ===
| Released | Title | Artist | Type |
|---|---|---|---|
| January 26 | "Imagine" | Sogumm, DJ Wegun | Single |
| March 9 | "Party Forever" | Simon Dominic | Single |
| April 2 | "Us2" | Yultron, Jay Park | Single |
| April 9 | "At Night" (밤이 되면) | Simon Dominic, Loco | Single |
| April 12 | "Summeride" | Jay Park | Single |
| May 14 | "Connected" | Gray | Single |
| May 28 | "?" (궁금해) | Jay Park, Don Mills, Loco, Nucksal | Single |
| June 11 | "I Want You Around" | Yugyeom | Single |
| June 17 | Point of View: U | Yugyeom | EP |
| June 25 | "You Get Off" | Code Kunst | single |
| July 12 | Demon Youth | Punchnello | Mixtape |
| August 3 | "All In" | Jay Park, pH-1, GroovyRoom | Single |
| August 10 | "I Don't Love You" | Gray | Single |
| August 17 | Grayground | Gray | Studio album |
| August 24 | "Just Like This" (이대로만) | Loco | Single |
| August 27 | "Only" | Lee Hi | Single |
| September 9 | 4 Only | Lee Hi | Studio album |
| September 27 | "Feel the Rhythm of Korea Part.2" | Woo Won-jae, Sogumm | Single |
| October 11 | "When The Rain Stops" (비가 그치면) | Hoody | Single |
| October 22 | Precious | Sogumm | Studio album |
| October 25 | D-Day | Hoody | EP |
| November 12 | "Moonlight" | Loco | Single |
| November 18 | "Break Your Heart" | Jay Park, Wiz Khalifa | Single |
| November 19 | "Get #MYWAY" | Gray | Single |
| November 26 | "WIN" | Simon Dominic | Single |
| December 3 | "Wall" | Woo Won-jae | Single |
| December 8 | "B.O.T.B." | Gaeko, Changmo, Don Mills, Los, DeVita, Sole, Since, Be'O | Single |
| December 9 | "Cheers" | Code Kunst, Lee Chan-hyuk, Colde, Sogumm | Single |

=== 2022 ===
| Released | Title | Artist | Type |
|---|---|---|---|
| January 1 | "To Life" | Jay Park | Single |
| January 4 | "Uniform" | Woo Won-jae | Single |
| January 24 | "Re: Up" | Coogie | Single |
| February 15 | American Gothic | DeVita | EP |
| March 3 | "Salt Rain" (소금비) | Sogumm, Keumbee | Single |
| March 31 | "Take You Down" | Yugyeom | Single |
| April 18 | Reality Check | Elo | Studio album |
| June 20 | "Take Me" | Code Kunst, Meenoi | Single |
| June 27 | "Alone" | Coogie | Single |
| July 25 | "Somebody" | Loco, Hwasa | Single |
| August 18 | "Ghosting" (잠수이별) | Woo Won-jae, Meenoi | Single |
| August 20 | "The Ball Is Round" | Code Kunst, Woo Won-jae, Jeon So-yeon | Single |
| September 19 | "TTFU" | Simon Dominic, Loco, Woo Won-jae, Coogie | Single |
| October 14 | "Tasty x Tasty" (맛있는 거 옆에) | Loco, Gray | Single |
| October 24 | "Go Back" | Jvcki Wai | Single |
| November 21 | "Be Ready" | Gray, Loco, Code Kunst | Single |
| November 24 | Comma | Woo Won-jae | EP |
| December 9 | "Amazing" | Hoody | Single |

=== 2023 ===
| Released | Title | Artist | Type |
|---|---|---|---|
| January 2 | "Ponytail" | Yugyeom | Single |
| January 18 | "Ground Zero" | DJ Wegun | Single |
| February 14 | "I Love You" (사랑해) | Sogumm | Single |
| March 8 | "Archive 01" | Code Kunst | Single |
| March 16 | Remember Archive | Code Kunst | Studio album |
| April 14 | DIFF | Coogie | EP |
| April 26 | "Rule Breaker" | Gray | Single |
| May 17 | Naughty | DeVita | EP |
| June 2 | "Ransome" | Woo Won-jae | Single |
| July 24 | "Lolo" | Yugyeom | Single |
| August 5 | "Riot" | Punchnello | Single |
| August 11 | "Live Classic" | Code Kunst, Woo Won-jae | Single |
| August 17 | "Ineedyourlove" | Loco | Single |
| September 12 | "Right Now" | Coogie | Single |
| September 21 | Sailing (항해) | Hoody | Studio album |
| October 17 | Weak | Loco | Studio album |
| November 9 | "And You" (어떨것같애) | Meenoi | Single |
| November 15 | "Letters to Santa" | DeVita | Single |
| November 21 | Bury (묻다) | Punchnello | EP |
| November 29 | "Ticket" | Meenoi | Single |
| December 12 | "Alley" (골목길) | Lee Hi, Sung Si-kyung | Single |
| December 21 | "A" | Leellamarz, Meenoi | Single |
