= Grayground =

Studio album by Gray
- Released: August 17, 2021
- Genre: Pop-trap; emo rap; contemporary R&B
- Length: 36:04
- Language: Korean
- Label: AOMG
- Producer: Gray

Singles from Grayground
- 1. "I Don't Love You" Released: August 10, 2021

Grayground (stylized as grayground.) is the debut studio album by South Korean singer and record producer Gray. It was released on August 17, 2021 through AOMG.

== Singles ==
"I Don't Love You" was pre-released on August 10, 2021. It charted at number 121 on the Gaon Digital Chart.

== Music and lyrics ==
Grayground encompasses trendy mainstream black music genres such as trap, funk, emo rap and dancehall with a strong touch of pop. It has songs with delicate instrumental composition such as "Rise", whose energetic rhythm creates a refreshing mood; "Ready to Love", which features rippling horn sounds; and "Eternal Sunshine", which features Jason Lee's sentimental saxophone performance in its postlude. The pre-release single "I Don't Love You" is a song about ending a relationship without regret. It has an "addictive melody" and "lyrics you can empathize with". The lead single "Party for the Night" is a cheerful party song with Lee Hi's catchy hook and Loco's smooth rap. It features modernized beats and melodies that drew inspiration from 90's hip-hop.

== Critical reception ==
Hwang Duha of Rhythmer rated Grayground 2.5 out of 5 stars. He pointed out that the various guest appearances on the album do not create synergy and steal the spotlight from Gray. Overall, he found Grayground to be a smoothly produced album that does not leave a strong impression.

Lim Seon-hui of IZM rated "I Don't Love You" 2.5 out of 5 stars. According to Lim, "I Don't Love You" does its job okay as a pre-release single, but the song itself lacks attractiveness because Gray's relaxed melodic rap performance on a melancholy guitar riff is bland.

=== Year-end lists ===
Publication	List	Rank	Ref.
Rolling Stone India	10 Best Korean Hip-Hop and R&B Albums of 2021	2	

== Track listing ==
No.	Title	Lyrics	Music	Arrangement	Length
1.	"Show Window" (featuring pH-1)	Gray; pH-1	Gray; pH-1	Gray	3:00
2.	"Selfish" (featuring Woo)	Gray; Woo	Gray; Dax	Gray; Dax	3:29
3.	"Make Love" (featuring Zion.T)	Gray; Zion.T	Gray; Zion.T	Gray; Park Junu	2:34
4.	"Rise" (featuring DeVita)	Gray; DeVita	Gray; Dax; DeVita	Gray; Dax	3:19
5.	"I Don't Love You" (featuring Coogie)	Gray; Coogie	Gray; Coogie	Gray	3:18
6.	"Party for the Night" (featuring Loco & Lee Hi)	Gray; Jay Park; Loco; Lee Hi	Gray; Jay Park; Lee Hi	Gray	2:53
7.	"Close 2 U" (featuring Punchnello)	Gray; Punchnello	Gray	Gray	3:18
8.	"Ready to Love" (featuring Hoody)	Gray; Hoody	Gray; Hoody	Gray; Hoody	3:38
9.	"Eternal Sunshine" (없던 일로 해; Eopdeon illo hae) (featuring Meenoi)	Gray; Hoody	Gray; Sam Kim; Hoody	Gray; Sam Kim	4:14
10.	"Baby Don't Cry" (featuring Yumdda)	Gray; Yumdda	Gray; Yumdda	Gray	3:01
11.	"U"	Gray	Gray	Gray	3:20
Total length:					36:04

== Charts ==
Chart (2021)	Peak position
South Korean Albums (Gaon)	14

== Sales ==
Region	Sales
South Korea	4,500
