= Elo (singer) =

South Korean singer

Elo 오민택
- Born: Oh Min-taek; February 11, 1991 (age 35); South Korea
- Genres: Hip-hop; R&B
- Occupation: Singer
- Instrument: Vocals
- Years active: 2013–present
- Label: AOMG
- Website: www.aomgofficial.com

Korean name
- Hangul: 오민택
- RR: O Mintaek
- MR: O Mint'aek

Oh Min-taek (Korean: 오민택; born February 11, 1991), better known by his stage name Elo (엘로), is a South Korean singer. He released his debut album, 8 Femmes, on August 26, 2016.

== Discography ==
=== Studio albums ===
Title	Album details	Peak chart positions	Sales
Title	Album details	KOR	Sales
Reality Check	Released: April 18, 2022; Label: AOMG; Formats: CD, digital download; Track listing: 1. Got It Bae feat. Boi B, Penomeco; 2. 1,2,3 feat. Jay Park; 3. F.W.B Part 2 feat. Moon Su-jin; 4. You've Got Call (이유없이) feat. Aiai; 5. She Got My feat. Dut2; 6. Falling Dreams (떨어지는 꿈) feat. pH-1; 7. Can't Be Happy; 8. Money or Die (돈 아니면) feat. SFC.JGR; 9. Speed Up feat. Coogie; 10. Cupcake feat. Punchnello	—	—N/a

=== Extended plays ===
Title	Album details	Peak chart positions	Sales
Title	Album details	KOR	Sales
8 Femmes	Released: August 26, 2016; Label: AOMG; Formats: CD, digital download; Track listing: 1. Wax Mannequeen; 2. F.W.B (Friends With Benefits) feat. Hoody; 3. Rose; 4. The End feat. Paloalto; 5. Day N Night feat. Gray; 6. Tattoo feat. Jay Park; 7. Angel feat. Simon Dominic; 8. Parachute feat. Gray	29	KOR: 826

=== Singles ===
==== As lead artist ====
Title	Year	Peak chart positions	Sales (DL)	Album
Title	Year	KOR	Sales (DL)	Album
"Blur" feat. Loco	2013	—	—N/a	Non-album singles
"Parachute" feat. Gray	2013	—	—N/a	Non-album singles
"Your Love" feat. The Quiett	2015	—	—N/a	Non-album singles
"F.W.B (Friends With Benefits)" feat. Hoody	2016	—	—N/a	Eight Femmes
"Tattoo" feat. Jay Park	2016	—	KOR: 13,639	Eight Femmes
"Rose"	2016	—	—N/a	Eight Femmes
"Oh I" feat. Penomeco	2018	—	—N/a	Non-album singles
"Don't You Worry" feat. Kirin	2018	—	—N/a	Non-album singles
"Lip Service" feat. Dynamic Duo	2018	—	—N/a	Non-album singles
"Osaka" feat. Zico	2018	—	—N/a	Non-album singles
"Home Alone" (나 홀로 집에)	2018	—	—N/a	Non-album singles
"Cupcake" feat. Punchnello	2020	—	—N/a	Reality Check
"Can't Be Happy"	2022	—	—N/a	Reality Check

==== Collaborations ====
Title	Year	Peak chart positions	Album
Title	Year	KOR	Album
"Love?" with Penomeco feat. Gray	2019	—	Odd

==== As featured artist ====
Title	Year	Peak chart positions	Sales (DL)	Album
Title	Year	KOR	Sales (DL)	Album
"Confessions" Swings feat. Elo	2013	—	—N/a	Swings #1 Mixtape Vol.II
"Blink (Remix)" (깜빡 (Remix)) Gray feat. Crush, Elo & Jinbo	2013	—	—N/a	Non-album singles
"Ceremony" G-Slow feat. Loco, Rhyme-A- & Elo	2013	—	—N/a	Non-album singles
"A Promise To You" (공약) Swings feat. Elo	2014	—	—N/a	Mood Swings II, Pt. 2: Obsessive Compulsive Disorder
"Growing Up" (적응) Loco feat. Elo	2014	—	—N/a	Locomotive
"Lonely Night (Gray Remix)" Simon Dominic feat. Elo	2015	—	—N/a	₩ & Only
"What The Hell" Sik-K feat. Donutman & Elo	2015	—	—N/a	Non-album single
"Positive" (긍정) Owen Ovadoz feat. Elo & L.I.V.E.	2016	—	—N/a	P.O.E.M.
"I Got The Style" Kkalchang feat. Elo	2016	—	—N/a	Rocksteady
"Good" Loco & Gray feat. Elo	2016	1	KOR: 370,352	Non-album single
"Turn Off Your Phone (Remix)" (전화기를 꺼놔 (Remix)) Jay Park feat. Elo	2016	—	—N/a	Everything You Wanted
"I Know" Henmi feat. Elo	2016	—	—N/a	Deep Shadow
"Lust" Hoody feat. Elo	2016	—	—N/a	On And On
"Ohh Wee" Big Tray feat. Elo	2017	—	—N/a	
"Better Days" DayDay feat. G2, Elo, DJ Wegun	2017	—	—N/a	All Day Every Day
"Uber XL" (집앞으로 갈게) Rhythm Power feat. Elo	2017	—	—N/a	Non-album single
"Have A Good Night" Woogie feat. Elo	2018	—	—N/a	Rewind My Tape Part. 1
"Dead End" (막다른 길) Takewon feat. Elo, Stella Jang, HYST	2018	—	—N/a	Green Ideology Director's Cut
"O.F.F" Penomeco feat. Gaeko, Elo	2018	—	—N/a	Garden
"Focus" Deepshower feat. Barney Artist, Elo, Niko Blank	2019	—	—N/a	Non-album single
"Bubble" Bronze feat. Elo, Sumin	2019	—	—N/a	East Shore
"No Time Late Night" Dustyy Han feat. Elo	2019	—	—N/a	7 Dustyy'2
"Somewhere" GooseBumps feat. Gray, Hoody, Elo, DeVita	2020	—	—N/a	Non-album single
"My Style" Bronze feat. Paloalto, Puff Daehee, Elo	2021	—	—N/a	Millennium
"Let Me In" Bronze feat. Elo	2021	—	—N/a	Millennium
"—" denotes releases that did not chart.
