= Point of View: U =

- Digital cover

EP by Yugyeom
- Released: June 17, 2021
- Genres: R&B
- Length: 24:11
- Language: Korean
- Label: AOMG

Singles from Point of View: U
- 1. "I Want U Around" Released: June 11, 2021

Point of View: U is the first EP of South Korean singer Yugyeom. It was released on June 17, 2021, through AOMG.

== Background and release ==
On June 3, 2021, media outlets reported the imminent release of a collaboration between Yugyeom and Gray. In the following days, AOMG announced June 11 and June 17 as the release dates, then revealing that Yugyeom would release a seven-track extended play titled Point of View: U. The record sees the participation of hip hop artists DeVita, Loco, Gray, Jay Park and Punchnello, with Gray producing five songs and Cha Cha Malone two.

The single "I Want You Around", featuring DeVita, was pre-released on June 11, 2021. The extended play was released on June 17 together with the music video of the title track "All Your Fault", and "tells a love story in all its rocky, emotional glory while exploring the different facets of R&B."

== Promotions ==
Yugyeom promoted "All Your Fault" with Gray on M Countdown on June 17, Show! Music Core on June 19, and Inkigayo on June 20.

== Music and lyrics ==
Point of View: U opens with "I Want You Around", described as an R&B song with a beat trap in which the singer expresses his desire for his lover. In "Running Through The Rain", Yugyeom promises to always be there, even in hard times; the song mixes synthesizer, pop and R&B, with a bridge that, according to NME, is reminiscent of late-'90s/early-2000s Daft Punk.

"All Your Fault" speaks of heartbreak, while "All About U", which features an EDM-based beat mixed with deep bass, expresses how all revolves around his lover. In "Love The Way" he confesses he can't stop his feelings, while in "Falling In Love" he sings of how falling in love leads to wanting to keep the one you love in your heart forever. The record is closed by the sentimental track "When U Fall", with "sophisticated guitar melodies and a soft piano instrumental."

== Critical reception ==
Professional ratings
Review scores
| Source | Rating |
|---|---|
| NME | 4/5 stars |
| Rhythmer | 2.5/5 stars |

In reviewing Point of View: U, Natasha Mulenga of NME called it "a triumphant introduction to his artistic independence" with which he "explores his budding artistry while shedding the constraints that comes with being an idol," giving the record 4 out of 5 stars. EnVi Magazine called the EP "divine" and wrote that the fact that Yugyeom was able to create music capable of moving people emotionally was "an illustration of his diversity and range as a composer, lyricist and performer."

Kim Hyo-jin of Rhythmer rated Point of View: U 2.5 out of 5 stars, finding the tracks very similar in rhythms, vibes and lyrics; on the other hand she appreciated the use of Yugyeom's lower vocal register, "which demonstrates his change and growth as a soloist."

=== Year-end lists ===
| Publication | List | Rank | Ref. |
|---|---|---|---|
| HipHopDX | Asia's 20 Best Albums of 2021 | n/a | |
| Rolling Stone India | 10 Best Korean Hip-Hop and R&B Albums of 2021 | 6 | |

== Track listing ==
| No. | Title | Lyrics | Music | Arrangement | Length |
|---|---|---|---|---|---|
| 1. | "I Want U Around" (Feat. DeVita) | Yugyeom; Gray; DeVita | Yugyeom; Gray; DeVita | Gray | 3:11 |
| 2. | "Running Through The Rain" | Yugyeom; Gray | Yugyeom; Gray; Dax; Perro | Gray; Dax; Perro | 4:04 |
| 3. | "All Your Fault" (네 잘못이야) (Feat. Gray) | Yugyeom; Gray | Yugyeom; Gray | Gray | 3:02 |
| 4. | "All About U" (Feat. Loco) | Yugyeom; Gray; Loco | Yugyeom; Gray | Gray | 3:44 |
| 5. | "Love The Way" (Feat. Jay Park & Punchnello) | Yugyeom; Jay Park; Punchnello | Yugyeom; Cha Cha Malone; Jay Park | Cha Cha Malone | 3:02 |
| 6. | "Falling In Love" | Yugyeom | Yugyeom; Cha Cha Malone; Cho Michelle; Adrian Mckinnon | Cha Cha Malone | 3:24 |
| 7. | "When You Fall" | Yugyeom; Gray | Yugyeom; Gray | Gray | 3:44 |
| Total length: | | | | | 24:11 |

== Charts ==
| Chart (2021) | Peak position | Sales |
|---|---|---|
| South Korea Weekly (Gaon) | 8 | KOR: 43,906 |
| South Korea Monthly (Gaon) | 22 | KOR: 43,906 |
