= DeVita (singer) =

South Korean-American singer (born 1998)

- 조윤경
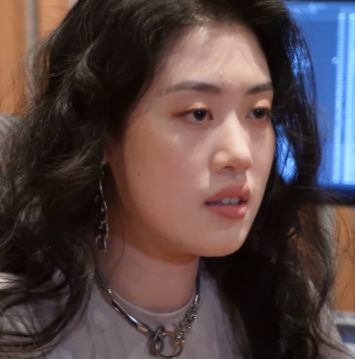
- DeVita in 2021
- Born: Cho Yoon-kyung; 20 April 1998 (age 28); Goyang, South Korea
- Other names: DeVita; Chloe DeVita
- Citizenship: South Korea; United States
- Occupations: Record producer; singer; songwriter
- Years active: 2018–present
- Musical career
- Origin: Chicago, Illinois, U. S.
- Genres: Hip hop; R&B
- Instrument: Vocals
- Labels: 8BallTown (2016–2020); AOMG (2020–present)

Korean name
- Hangul: 조윤경
- RR: Jo Yungyeong
- MR: Cho Yun'gyŏng

Cho Yoon-kyung (Korean: 조윤경; born April 20, 1998), known professionally as DeVita and formerly as Chloe DeVita, is a South Korean record producer, singer, and songwriter based in the United States.

== Early life and career ==
Cho Yoon-kyung was born on April 20, 1998, in Goyang, South Korea. After moving to the United States in 2009, she spent her teenage years in Chicago.

In 2012, at just 16 years old, she participated in the South Korean SBS channel's K-pop Star program, receiving praise for her performance. Two years later, she participated in Kollaboration Chicago, a talent show, finishing in second place. However, she was discovered thanks to her SoundCloud account, where she caught the attention of several artists. In 2018, she was signed by the label 8BallTown and secured several collaborations with major artists before her debut, including Woo Won-jae, Jay Park, and rapper Ugly Duck.

In 2020, South Korean hip hop and R&B label AOMG announced DeVita's official addition to its roster of artists. Her departure as an artist from 8BallTown did not interfere with her good relationship with the agency, and she continues to actively collaborate with them. That year, she debuted as a solo artist with her first EP titled CRÈME, a title that refers to the phrase “crème de la crème,” which means “the best of the best” in French. The album consists of five tracks that explore her growth as an artist over the past three years and demonstrate her versatile skills as a record producer, singer, and songwriter.

== Discography ==
=== Extended plays ===
Title	Details	Peak chart positions
Title	Details	KOR
CRÈME	Release: April 9, 2020; Label: AOMG; Formats: CD, digital download	—
American Gothic	Released: February 15, 2022; Label: AOMG; Formats: CD, digital download	—
Naughty	Released: May 17, 2023; Label: AOMG; Formats: CD, digital download	—
Letters to Santa	Released: November 15, 2023; Label: AOMG; Formats: CD, digital download	—
The Tree is Burning	Released: March 4, 2026; Label: Vita Sancta	—
"—" denotes releases that did not chart or were not released in that region.

=== Collaborative studio albums ===
Title	Details	Peak chart positions
Title	Details	KOR
사랑은 노래와도 같이 (Love is a Song) (with Don Malik)	Release: June 13, 2025; Label: Ambition Musik; Formats: CD, digital download	—
"—" denotes releases that did not chart or were not released in that region.
