= No Open Flames =

EP by Simon Dominic
- Released: September 3, 2019
- Genre: Hip-hop
- Length: 18:21
- Language: Korean
- Label: AOMG

Simon Dominic chronology
Darkroom (2018)	No Open Flames (2019)

Singles from No Open Flames
- 1. "DAx4" Released: August 14, 2019; 2. "Make Her Dance" Released: August 21, 2019

No Open Flames (Korean: 화기엄금; RR: Hwagieomgeum) is the first EP of South Korean rapper Simon Dominic. It was released on September 3, 2019 through AOMG.

== Singles ==
"DAx4" was released on August 14, 2019.

"Make Her Dance" was released on August 21, 2019 and peaked at number 86 on the Gaon Digital Chart.

== Critical reception ==
Lee Jin-seok of Rhythmer rated No Open Flames 3.5 out of 5 stars. According to Lee, it is the most enjoyable and complete work in Simon Dominic's discography.

=== Accolades ===
Publication	Country	Accolade	Rank
Rhythmer	South Korea	"10 Best Korean Rap/Hip-hop Albums of 2019"	7

== Track listing ==
No.	Title	Lyrics	Music	Arrangement	Length
1.	"Intro"	Simon Dominic	Goosebumps; Simon Dominic	Goosebumps	1:30
2.	"DAx4"	Simon Dominic	Goosebumps; Simon Dominic	Goosebumps; Simon Dominic	2:08
3.	"GOTT" (featuring Moon, Woo and Jvcki Wai)	Simon Dominic; Woo; Jvcki Wai; Moon	Goosebumps; Simon Dominic	Goosebumps	2:49
4.	"Make Her Dance" (featuring Loopy and Crush)	Simon Dominic; Loopy; Crush	Goosebumps; Simon Dominic; Loopy; Crush	Goosebumps	2:51
5.	"Pose!" (featuring Yumdda)	Simon Dominic; Yumdda	Goosebumps; Simon Dominic	Goosebumps	2:44
6.	"Room Type"	Simon Dominic	Goosebumps; Simon Dominic; Leellamarz	Goosebumps	2:18
7.	"Ya Ain't Gang" (featuring JayAllDay and Simo of Y2K92)	Simon Dominic; JayAllDay; Simo	Goosebumps; Simon Dominic	Goosebumps	4:01
Total length:					18:21
