= Hyena on the Keyboard =

South Korean television variety show

- Genre: Music; Reality; Variety
- Country of origin: South Korea
- Original language: Korean
- No. of episodes: 10

Production
- Running time: 70-85 minutes

Original release
- Network: KBS2
- Release: October 7, 2017 – April 20, 2018

Hyena on the Keyboard (Korean: 건반 위의 하이에나) was a South Korean variety show on KBS2. It is a music reality television show whereby the process of song production from various producers/singer-songwriters is shown. The completed songs will then be released as digital singles on various online music sites.

The show also has a side corner where rookie singer-songwriters are introduced; their self-produced songs will also be released on various online music sites.

Two pilot episodes were aired on October 7 and 8, 2017 while the four songs produced through the pilot episodes were released on October 9. The regular program began to air every Friday at 23:00 (KST) from March 2, 2018 until April 20, 2018.

== Hosts ==
- Jeong Hyeong-don (also hosted Pilot Episodes 1–2)
- Jung Jae-hyung
- Sleepy
- Sunny (only hosted Pilot Episodes 1–2)

== Episodes ==
=== Pilot ===
| Ep. | Broadcast date | Producer(s) | Guest(s) | Note(s) |
|---|---|---|---|---|
| 1 | October 7, 2017 | Yoon Jong-shin; Jung Jae-hyung; Gray; Hui (Pentagon) | N(A) | Special appearance by Uhm Jung-hwa |
| 2 | October 8, 2017 | Yoon Jong-shin; Jung Jae-hyung; Gray; Hui (Pentagon) | Sleepy, Loco, Hoody, Jung Seung-hwan, Jo Woo-chan | Special appearance by Kino (Pentagon) |

=== Regular ===
| Ep. | Broadcast date | Producer(s) | Guest(s) | Note(s) |
|---|---|---|---|---|
| 1 | March 2, 2018 | Gray; Rhythm Power; Ailee; Jeong Dong-hwan (MeloMance) | N(A) | Special appearance by Nayoung (Pristin) |
| 2 | March 9, 2018 | Gray; Rhythm Power; Ailee; Jeong Dong-hwan (MeloMance); Yang Da-il (For Super Rookie Corner) | N(A) | Special appearances by Pentagon (Hui, Kino) |
| 3 | March 16, 2018 | Hyungdon and Daejun; Rose Motel; Peppertones | Chungha | Special voice appearance through phone by Lucid Fall; Special performance appearance by Yun Ddan Ddan |
| 4 | March 23, 2018 | Hyungdon and Daejun; Rose Motel; Peppertones; Yun Ddan Ddan (For Super Rookie Corner); Hyunsik (BtoB) | Chungha | N(A) |
| 5 | March 30, 2018 | Hyunsik (BtoB); Yang Dong-geun | JeA (Brown Eyed Girls) | Special appearances by the rest of BtoB, Hong Jin-young, Hani (EXID) |
| 6 | April 6, 2018 | Hyunsik (BtoB); Yang Dong-geun; Se So Neon (For Super Rookie Corner); JB (Got7) | JeA (Brown Eyed Girls) | Special appearances by BtoB (Eunkwang, Changsub, Sungjae), Gye Min-ah (Fantastic Duo winner), Esther Kim (Top 6 in K-pop Star 4), LX (rapper), 1stSON (rapper), Lee Won-woo (choreographer), Park Jin-young, Got7 (Youngjae, Yugyeom) |
| 7 | April 13, 2018 | Kim Tae-won; Kim Jong-seo; JB (Got7); Loco; Hwasa (Mamamoo) | N(A) | Special appearances by Woogie (producer from H1GHR Music), Kim Kyung-ho, Park Wan-kyu, Park Jin-young Got7 (Youngjae, Yugyeom), Royal Dive (producer duo) |
| 8 | April 20, 2018 | Kim Tae-won; Kim Jong-seo; JB (Got7); Loco; Hwasa (Mamamoo) | N(A) | Special appearances by Royal Dive, Mirror Boy (producer), Park Jin-young, Got7 (Jinyoung, Youngjae, Yugyeom), the rest of Mamamoo; Special voice appearance through phone by Kim Shin-young; Special performance appearances by Kim Dong-myung (Boohwal), Woogie |

== Discography ==
=== Pilot ===
Released on October 9, 2017
| No. | Title | Lyrics | Music | Artist | Length |
|---|---|---|---|---|---|
| 1. | "Trace" (너를 찾아서) | Yoon Jong-shin | Yoon Jong-shin; Kang Hwa-sung | Yoon Jong-shin | 04:01 |
| 2. | "You Never Know (with Jung Seung-hwan)" (그댄 모르죠) | Jung Jae-hyung | Jung Jae-hyung | Jung Jae-hyung | 05:42 |
| 3. | "I'm Fine (with Sleepy, Loco, Hoody)" (잘) | Gray; Loco; Sleepy; Hoody | Gray; Hoody | Gray | 03:17 |
| 4. | "Wake Me Up (with Jo Woo-chan)" | Hui; Jo Woo-chan | Hui; Flow Blow | Hui (Pentagon) | 03:45 |
| Total length: | | | | | 16:45 |

=== Part 1 ===
Released on March 10, 2018
| No. | Title | Lyrics | Music | Artist | Length |
|---|---|---|---|---|---|
| 1. | "Capture (feat. Gray)" | Rhythm Power; Gray | Gray | Rhythm Power | 03:13 |
| 2. | "Shine" | Ailee | Ailee; Jeong Dong-hwan | Ailee; Jeong Dong-hwan (MeloMance) | 04:11 |
| 3. | "Your Everything" | Yang Da-il | Yang Da-il; Tomajo | Yang Da-il | 03:40 |
| Total length: | | | | | 11:03 |

=== Part 2 ===
Released on March 24, 2018
| No. | Title | Lyrics | Music | Artist | Length |
|---|---|---|---|---|---|
| 1. | "6th Grade" (6학년) | Hyungdon and Daejun; Rose Motel | Hyungdon & Daejun; Rose Motel | Hyungdon & Daejun; Rose Motel | 05:14 |
| 2. | "Cowboy's Sea" (카우보이의 바다) | Peppertones | Peppertones | Peppertones | 03:17 |
| 3. | "It Will Be Okay" (잘 될 거예요) | Yun Ddan Ddan | Yun Ddan Ddan | Yun Ddan Ddan | 04:22 |
| Total length: | | | | | 12:53 |

=== Part 3 ===
Released on April 7, 2018
| No. | Title | Lyrics | Music | Artist | Length |
|---|---|---|---|---|---|
| 1. | "If I Hug You" (너를 안고 있으면) | Im Hyun-sik | Im Hyun-sik | Im Hyun-sik (BtoB) | 04:21 |
| 2. | "Package Of Love" (사랑의 택배) | Im Hyun-chan; Lee So-yoon | Im Hyun-chan; havidim | Yang Dong-geun | 04:18 |
| 3. | "Chaotic Spring" (난춘 (亂春)) | Hwang So-yoon | Hwang So-yoon | Se So Neon | 03:48 |
| 4. | "If I Hug You (Inst.)" (너를 안고 있으면 (Inst.)) | | Im Hyun-sik | | 04:21 |
| Total length: | | | | | 16:48 |

=== Part 4 ===
Released on April 21, 2018
| No. | Title | Lyrics | Music | Artist | Length |
|---|---|---|---|---|---|
| 1. | "Don't Give It To Me" (주지마) | Loco; Hwasa | Woogie; Loco; Hwasa | Loco; Hwasa (Mamamoo) | 03:51 |
| 2. | "Rainy" | JB | JB; 220VOLT; Royal Dive | JB (Got7) | 03:11 |
| 3. | "Light" (빛) | Kim Tae-won | Kim Jong-seo | Kim Jong-seo; Kim Tae-won | 03:25 |
| 4. | "Don't Give It To Me (Inst.)" (주지마 (Inst.)) | | Woogie; Loco; Hwasa | | 03:51 |
| Total length: | | | | | 14:18 |

=== Charted songs ===
| Title | Year | Peak chart positions | Sales | Remarks |
| Title | Year | KOR Gaon | Sales | Remarks |
|---|---|---|---|---|
| "Trace" (너를 찾아서) Yoon Jong-shin | 2017 | 9 | KOR: 252,121+ | Hyena on the Keyboard (Pilot) |
| "You Never Know" (그댄 모르죠) Jung Jae-hyung with Jung Seung-hwan | 2017 | 85 | KOR: 24,373+ | Hyena on the Keyboard (Pilot) |
| "I'm Fine" (잘) Gray with Sleepy, Loco, Hoody | 2017 | 15 | KOR: 133,729+ | Hyena on the Keyboard (Pilot) |
| "Wake Me Up" Hui (Pentagon) with Jo Woo-chan | 2017 | — | KOR: 17,921+ | Hyena on the Keyboard (Pilot) |
| "Don't Give It to Me" (주지마) Loco, Hwasa (Mamamoo) | 2018 | 1 | — | Hyena on the Keyboard Part.4 |

== Ratings ==
In the ratings below, the highest rating for the show will be in red, and the lowest rating for the show will be in blue each year.

| Ep. | Broadcast date | Average audience share (Nationwide) | |
| Ep. | Broadcast date | AGB Nielsen | TNmS |
|---|---|---|---|
| 1 | March 2, 2018 | 0.9% | 1.3% |
| 2 | March 9, 2018 | 1.2% | 1.5% |
| 3 | March 16, 2018 | 0.9% | 1.4% |
| 4 | March 23, 2018 | 0.8% | 1.1% |
| 5 | March 30, 2018 | 1.0% | 1.1% |
| 6 | April 6, 2018 | 1.4% | 1.1% |
| 7 | April 13, 2018 | 1.3% | 1.3% |
| 8 | April 20, 2018 | 1.1% | 1.5% |
