= Meenoi =

South Korean singer

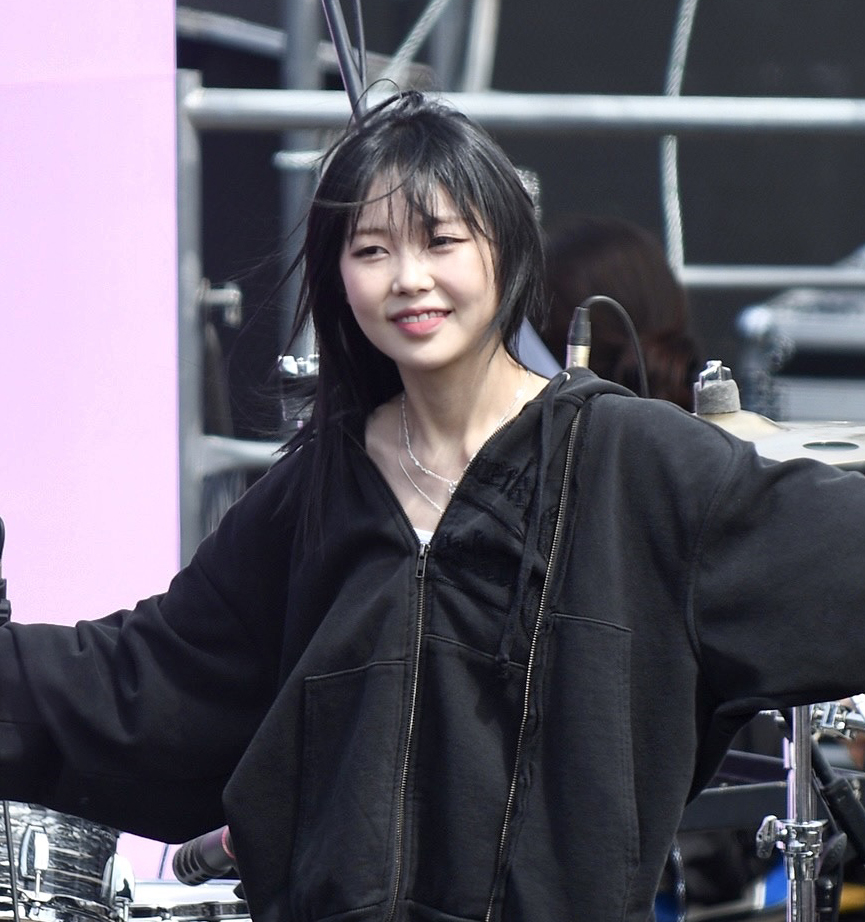
- Meenoi in 2023

Background information
- Born: Park Min-young; April 9, 1997 (age 29); Taean, Chungcheongnam-do, South Korea
- Occupation: Singer
- Years active: 2019–present
- Labels: AOMG; Duover

Park Min-young (Korean: 박민영; born April 9, 1997), known professionally as Meenoi (Korean: 미노이), is a South Korean singer. She released her debut studio album In My Room in 2021. In 2022, she released single "Ghosting" with Woo Won-jae which was nominated for Best Collaboration at the MAMA Awards.

== Early life and education ==
Meenoi was born in Taean and grew up in Bucheon. When she was in elementary school, she went to karaoke with her friend who sang really well. She started singing because she wanted to do better than the friend.

She studied applied music at Hanyang University.

== Career ==
In 2019, Meenoi released her debut single "NDGGA". In 2020, she signed to 8BallTown. She garnered attention for her "annoying" (킹받는) image after she released single "WGC" in February 2021 and became the host of Meenoi's Yorizori in August. In October, she released her debut studio album In My Room. In 2022, she released single "Ghosting" with Woo Won-jae which was nominated for Best Collaboration at the MAMA Awards.

In 2023, she signed to AOMG.

== Artistry ==
Meenoi "captures aspects of her daily life in her own language and tone".

== Personal life ==
Meenoi has two cats named Sesum and Mingming.

== Discography ==
=== Studio album ===
Title	Details	Peak chart positions	Sales
Title	Details	KOR	Sales
In My Room	Released: October 13, 2021; Label: 8BallTown; Format: CD, digital download	44	—
Noi Mas	Released: November 30, 2022	—	—
This is my life	Released: July 3, 2024; Label: AOMG; Format: CD, digital download	96	KOR: 740
"—" denotes releases that did not chart or were not released in that region.

=== Singles ===
Title	Year	Peak chart position
Title	Year	KOR
"NDGGA" (너답기기안)	2019	—
"WGC" (우리집 고양이 츄르를 좋아해) (feat. Yumdda)	2021	—
"Ghosting" (잠수이별) (with Woo Won-jae)	2022	29
"Just That Much" (그만큼만)	2022	—
"As If" (마치) (with Kid Milli)	2023	—
"How Do You Think It Would Be" (어떨 것 같애) (with Zico)	2023	—
"Ticket"	2023	—
"—" denotes releases that did not chart or were not released in that region.

== Filmography ==
=== TV ===
Year	Title	Role	Ref.
2022	King of Mask Singer	Contestant	

== Awards and nominations ==
Award	Year	Nominee	Category	Result	Ref.
MAMA Awards	2022	"Ghosting"	Best Collaboration	Nominated	
