= Black Out (Woo Won-jae album) =

Studio album by Woo Won-jae
- Released: August 18, 2020
- Genre: Hip hop
- Length: 31:56
- Language: Korean
- Label: AOMG

Woo Won-jae chronology
af (2018)	Black Out (2020)

Singles from Black Out
- 1. "Used to" Released: August 11, 2020

Black Out (stylized in all caps) is the debut studio album of South Korean rapper Woo Won-jae. It was released on August 18, 2020, through AOMG.

== Singles ==
"Used to" was released on August 11, 2020.

== Critical reception ==
Professional ratings
Review scores
Source	Rating
Rhythmer	3.5/5 stars
IZM	3.5/5 stars

Lee Jin-seok of Rhythmer rated Black Out 3.5 out of 5 stars.

Lee Hong-hyeon of IZM also rated the album 3.5 out of 5 stars.

=== Accolades ===
Publication	Country	Accolade	Rank
Rhythmer	South Korea	"10 Best Korean Rap/Hip-hop Albums of 2020"	Honorable Mention

== Track listing ==
No.	Title	Lyrics	Music	Arrangement	Length
1.	"Black Out"	Woo Won-jae	Khyo; Woo Won-jae	Khyo; Woo Won-jae	4:00
2.	"R.I.P."	Woo Won-jae	Khyo	Khyo	2:19
3.	"Used to" (featuring Cifika)	Woo Won-jae; Cifika	Khyo; Cifika	Khyo	3:30
4.	"Do Not Disturb" (featuring Soyoon)	Woo Won-jae; Soyoon	Khyo; Cifika	Khyo	3:15
5.	"Chik Chik Pok Pok Freestyle" (칙칙폭폭 Freestyle) (featuring Jvcki Wai and Simo)	Woo Won-jae; Jvcki Wai; Simo	Khyo	Khyo	2:59
6.	"Job" (featuring Tiger JK and Qim Isle)	Woo Won-jae; Tiger JK; Qim Isle	Khyo	Khyo	2:26
7.	"Chingiz Khan" (징기즈칸)	Woo Won-jae	Khyo; Woo Won-jae	Woo Won-jae	3:05
8.	"Canada"	Woo Won-jae	Terim; Woo Won-jae	Terim; Ko Gyeong-cheon	6:42
9.	"Fever" (featuring Sogumm)	Woo Won-jae	Khyo; Woo Won-jae	Khyo	3:36
Total length:					31:56

== Charts ==
Chart (2021)	Peak position
South Korean Albums (Gaon)	31

== Sales ==
Region	Sales
South Korea	2,799
