= Ugly Duck =

South Korean rapper

Ugly Duck 선주경
- Born: Sun Ju-kyung; January 19, 1991 (age 35); Gwangju, South Korea
- Genres: Hip-hop; R&B
- Occupations: Rapper; singer
- Years active: 2013–present
- Label: AOMG
- Website: aomgofficial.com

- Ugly Duck
- Hangul: 선주경
- RR: Seon Jugyeong
- MR: Sŏn Chugyŏng

Sun Ju-kyung (Korean: 선주경; born January 19, 1991), better known by his stage name Ugly Duck (어글리 덕), is a South Korean rapper and singer. He released his debut album, Scene Stealers with Jay Park, on July 13, 2016.

== Discography ==
=== Extended plays ===
Title	Album details	Peak chart positions		Sales
Title	Album details	KOR	US World	Sales
Scene Stealers (with Jay Park)	Released: July 13, 2016; Label: AOMG, CJ E&M; Formats: CD, digital download; Track listing: 1. "Ain't No Party Like An AOMG Party" (우리가 빠지면 Party가 아니지); 2. "Put 'Em Up" (ㅎㄷㄷ); 3. "PLP" feat. Far East Movement; 4. "Nowhere"; 5. "Who You" (니가 알던 내가 아냐)[Remix] feat. Loco, Day Day & Simon Dominic; 6. "Ain't No Party Like An AOMG Party" (우리가 빠지면 Party가 아니지) [Clean ver.]	35	8	KOR: 500+

=== Singles ===
Title	Year	Peak chart positions		Sales (DL)	Album
Title	Year	KOR	US World	Sales (DL)	Album
As lead artist
"Whatever" feat. Mayson The Soul & U-Turn	2015	—	—	—N/a	non-album singles
"Asia" feat. Reddy, JJJ & DJ Scratch Nice	2015	—	—	—N/a	non-album singles
Collaborations
"C.U.I.O (Count Until It's Over)" with Dok2, Skyzoo, Samuel Seo and High Flies	2013	—	—	—N/a	non-album singles
"A Piece Of Cake" (누워서 떡 먹기) with DJ Wegun feat. Incredivle	2015	—	—	—N/a	non-album singles
"Ain't No Party Like An AOMG Party" (우리가 빠지면 Party가 아니지) with Jay Park	2016	102	24	KOR: 24,537+	Scene Stealers
"Put 'Em Up" (ㅎㄷㄷ) with Jay Park	2016	117	—	KOR: 18,101+	Scene Stealers
As featured artist
"Mommae" (몸매) Jay Park feat. Ugly Duck	2015	12	12	KOR: 431,874+	₩orld ₩ide
"BO$$" Jay Park feat. Yultron, Loco & Ugly Duck	2015	142	—	KOR: 18,156+	₩orld ₩ide
"—" denotes releases that did not chart.

=== Other charted songs ===
Title	Year	Peak chart positions	Sales (DL)	Album
Title	Year	KOR	Sales (DL)	Album
Collaborations
Who You (니가 알던 내가 아냐) [Remix] feat. Loco, Day Day & Simon Dominic	2016	148	—N/a	Scene Stealers
"PLP" feat. Far East Movement	2016	229	—N/a	Scene Stealers
"Nowhere"	2016	— (Note: "NOWHERE" did not chart of the Gaon Digital Chart, but peaked at number 215 on the Gaon Download Chart)	—N/a	Scene Stealers
As featured artist
"Don't Try Me" Jay Park feat. Ugly Duck & Gray	2015	129	KOR: 19,100+	₩orld ₩ide
"F*ckboy" (병신) Jay Park feat. Sik-K, BewhY & Ugly Duck	2015	134	KOR: 18,434+	₩orld ₩ide
"—" denotes releases that did not chart.
