= Seoul Metropolitan Fire and Disaster Management Headquarters =

Coordinates: 37°33′32″N 126°59′20″E

- 서울특별시 소방재난본부

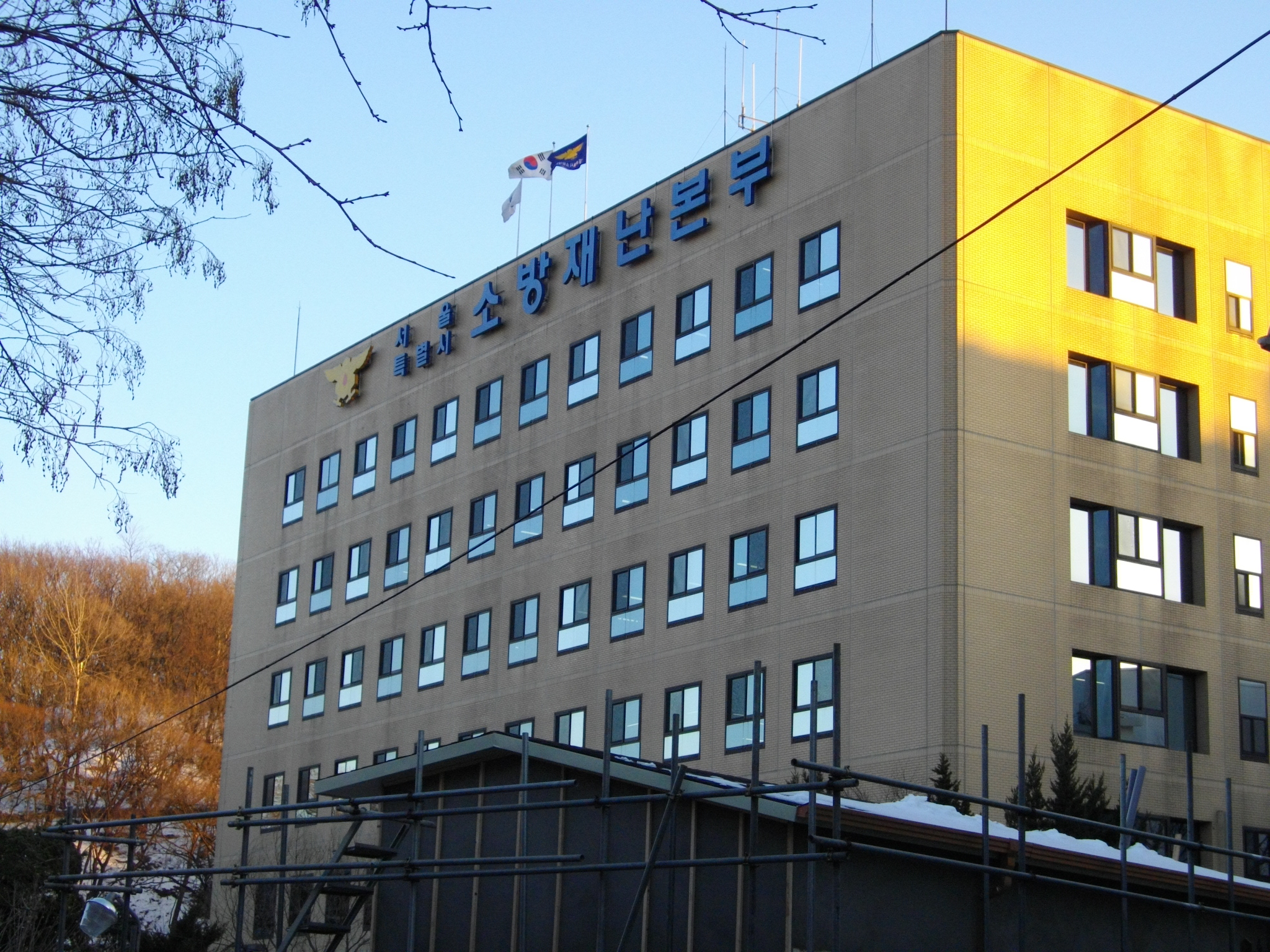
- Formation: June 1, 1972
- Legal status: Municipal Fire Service
- Location: Jung-gu, Seoul, Republic of Korea
- Website: fire.seoul.go.kr

Seoul Metropolitan Fire and Disaster Management Headquarters is a department of the Seoul Metro government in charge of fire and rescue services in Seoul, South Korea.

== Fire districts and fire stations ==
Firefighters of Seoul Fire Services, 2013

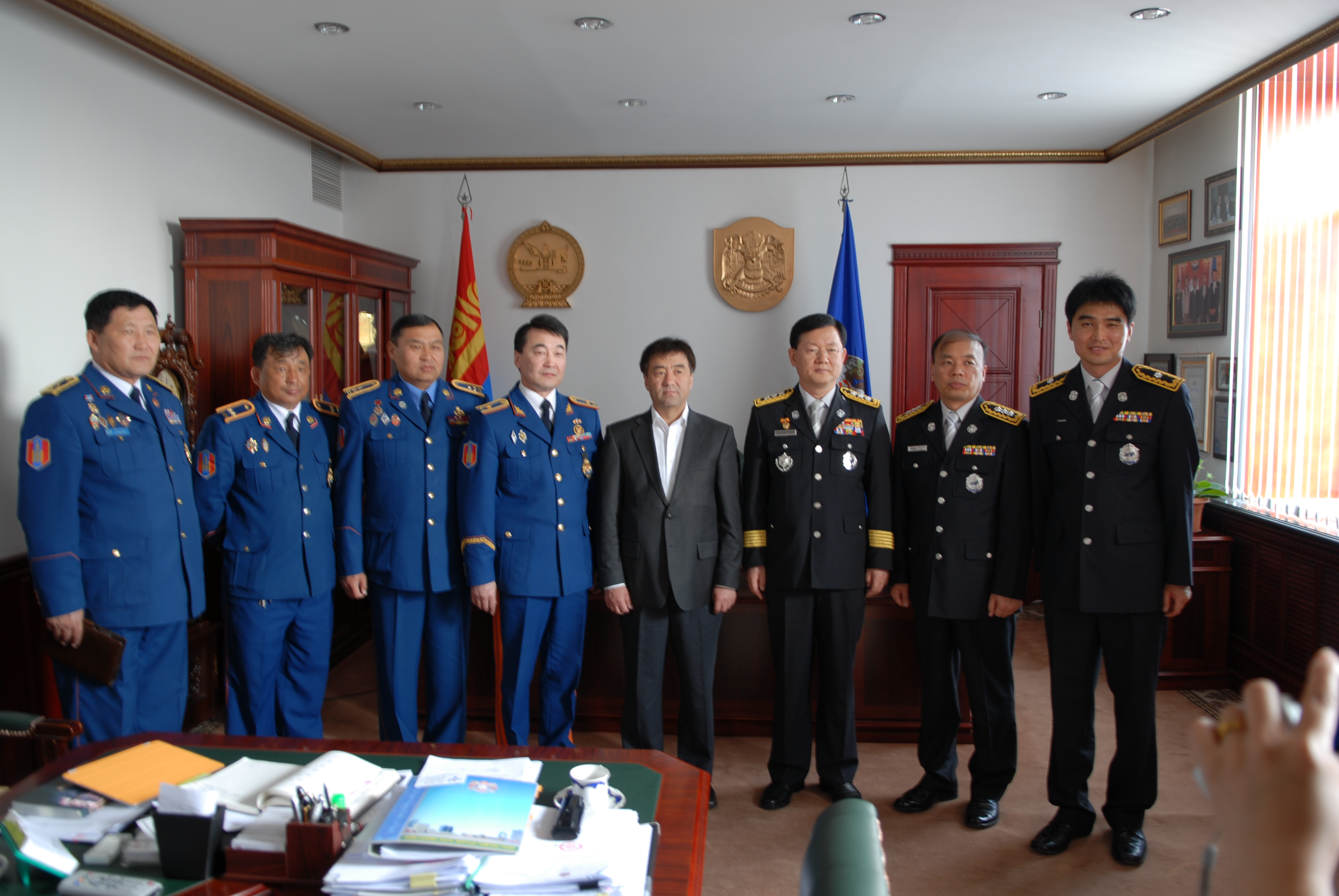
Personnel of the Seoul Fire Services with members of the Emergency Management Department of Mongolia in Ulanbaatar.

- Fire districts : 4
- Fire stations : 23
- 1st Fire district : Jongno, Jungbu, Yongsan, Eunpyeong, Mapo, Seodaemun
- 2nd Fire district : Dongdaemun, Gwangjin, Seongbuk, Dobong, Nowon, Jungnang, Gangbuk
- 3rd Fire district : Yeongdeungpo, Gangseo, Yangcheon, Guro, Gwanak, Dongjak
- 4th Fire district : Gangnam, Gangdong, Seocho, Songpa
