= Henmi =

Henmi (written: 辺見 or 逸見) is a Japanese surname. Notable people with the surname include:

- Emiri Henmi (辺見 えみり, born 1976), Japanese actress and singer
- Jun Henmi (辺見 じゅん, 1939–2011), Japanese writer and poet
- Mari Henmi (辺見 マリ, born 1950), Japanese singer, tarento, and actress
- Henmi Sōsuke (逸見 宗助, 1843–1894), Japanese swordsman and martial arts instructor
