= Woo Won-jae =

South Korean rapper (born 1996)

- 우원재
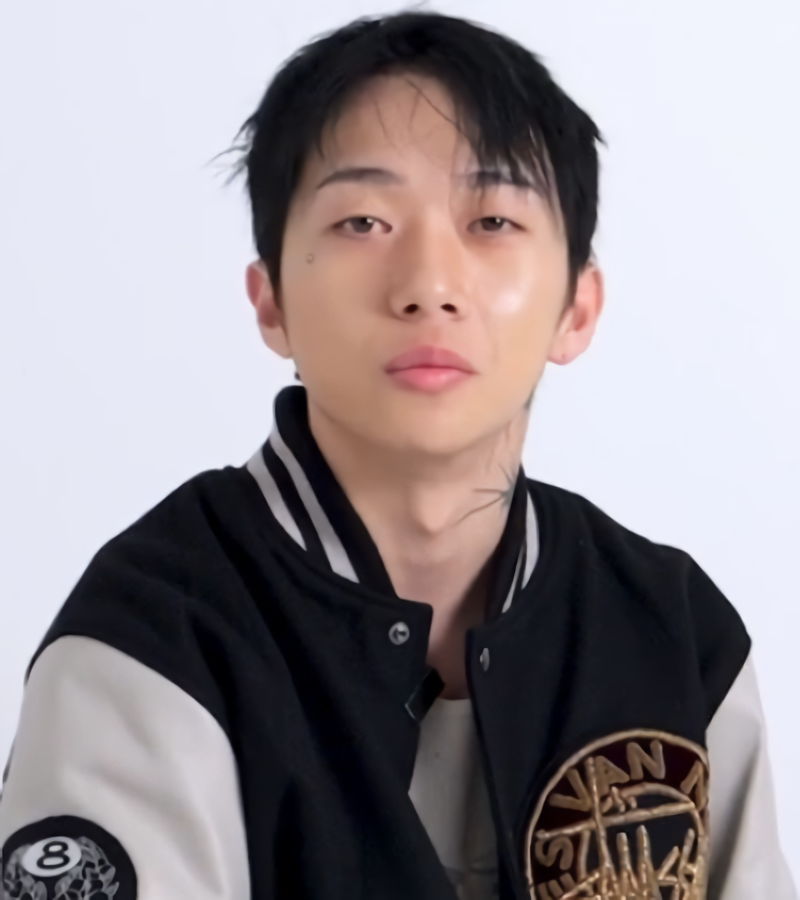
- Woo in 2023
- Born: December 23, 1996 (age 29); Gyeongju, South Korea
- Other name: Woo
- Occupation: Rapper
- Musical career
- Genres: Hip hop; rap
- Years active: 2017–present
- Labels: AOMG; Duover

Korean name
- Hangul: 우원재
- Hanja: 禹元才
- RR: U Wonjae
- MR: U Wŏnjae

Woo Won-jae (Korean: 우원재; born December 23, 1996), also known as Woo, is a South Korean rapper. In 2017, he released his debut single "We Are" (Korean: 시차; RR: Sicha) which had commercial success and widespread acclaim. He has released one studio album and two EPs.

== Career ==
=== 2017–2018: Show Me the Money 6, signing with AOMG and AF ===
In 2017, Woo participated in Show Me the Money 6, where he finished in third place. He gained a lot of popularity through the show.

Woo made his debut through releasing a single "We Are", featuring Gray and Loco on September 4, 2017. The single was meant for Woo's final 2 stage in the finals of Show Me The Money 6, but he was eliminated in the top 3 round. The song was a very huge success as it made a successful all-kill in numerous Korean charts.

On October 31, it was announced that Woo has signed with hip hop label AOMG. Following the signing, he released a single album titled "Anxiety" on November 2.

Woo released his first EP AF on November 22, 2018, with the lead single "A Fence". One of the tracks on the EP, titled "Cash", was pre-released on November 16.

=== 2020: Black Out ===
Woo released his first studio album Black Out on August 18. The album included the pre-release single "Used To", which was released on August 11.

=== 2022: Comma ===
Woo released his second EP Comma on November 24.

=== 2024: Departure from AOMG and new label ===
In March 2024, it was announced that Woo has left hip hop label AOMG after his exclusive contract with them has expired. On May 31, Woo, along with Gray and Code Kunst, co-founded Duover, a new label.

== Artistry ==
i-D wrote that "Having spoken publicly about his struggle with anxiety and panic attacks, Woo's lyrics are just as honest and open as he is – from not being afraid to get dark when expressing his feelings, to revealing details of a romantic relationship."

== Philanthropy ==
On March 8, 2022, Woo donated ₩10 million to the Hope Bridge Disaster Relief Association to help those affected by the massive wildfires that started in Uljin, Gyeongbuk, which also spread to Samcheok, Gangwon.

== Discography ==
=== Studio albums ===
| Title | Album details | Peak chart positions | Sales |
| Title | Album details | KOR | Sales |
|---|---|---|---|
| Black Out | Released: August 18, 2020; Labels: AOMG, Genie, Stone Music; Formats: CD, digital download | 31 | KOR: 2,799 |

=== Extended plays ===
| Title | EP details | Peak chart positions | Sales |
| Title | EP details | KOR | Sales |
|---|---|---|---|
| AF | Released: November 22, 2018; Labels: AOMG, Genie, Stone Music; Formats: CD, digital download | 37 | KOR: 1,620 |
| Comma | Released: November 24, 2022; Labels: AOMG, Genie, Stone Music; Formats: CD, digital download; Track listing: 1. "Repeat"; 2. "Glass" (feat. Wonstein); 3. "Our" (우리); 4. "Me" (나야); 5. "Mommy"; 6. "Want It Good" (그래요) | 43 | KOR: 2,000 |
| mp3 | Released: April 14, 2026; Labels: Duover; Formats: CD, digital download; Track listing: 1. "30" (서른); 2. "Like Seeks Like" (끼리끼리); 3. "Online Hate"; 4. "Cock" (싸가지) (feat. Wonstein); 5. "Bullshit" (개소리) (feat. Wonstein); 6. "Cap"; 7. "Slow Down" (그래요) | TBA | |

=== Singles ===
| Title | Year | Peak chart positions | Album |
| Title | Year | KOR | Album |
As lead artist
| "Chopsticks" (젓가락) with Maniac, Black Nine, Asol feat. Tiger JK, Bizzy, Ann One | 2017 | 34 | Show Me the Money 6 Episode 1 |
| "Again" (또) feat. Tiger JK, Bizzy, MRSHLL | 2017 | 13 | Show Me the Money 6 Episode 3 |
| "Zinza" (진자) feat. YDG, Suran | 2017 | 33 | Show Me the Money 6 Episode 4 |
| "Move" feat. Bizzy | 2017 | 16 | Show Me the Money 6 Episode 5 |
| "We Are" (시차) feat. Loco, Gray | 2017 | 1 | Non-album single |
| "A Coin Pt.2 (Remix)" (동전한닢 Pt.2 (Remix)) with Nucksal, Jo Woo-chan, Hanhae, Ryno, myunDo, Junoflo, Double K, Ness, Woodie GoChild, Ja Mezz, Olltii, Killagramz,Young B, Hash Swan, Hangzoo, Maniac, Black Nine, P-Type, Asol | 2017 | — | Show Me the Money 6 Special |
| "Loop" (과거에게) | 2017 | 51 | Anxiety |
| "Paranoid" | 2017 | 100 | Anxiety |
| "Balance (Prod. by Code Kunst)" with Loco | 2018 | 29 | Non-album single |
| "Cash" | 2018 | — | AF |
| "A Fence" (울타리) | 2018 | — | AF |
| "Engine (Prod. Code Kunst)" (엔.진) with Jay Park | 2019 | 182 | Non-album singles |
| "Taste (Prod. Gray)" (호불호) feat. Giriboy | 2019 | 21 | Non-album singles |
| "SS (Prod. KHYO)" feat. Simon Dominic, Hoody | 2019 | — | Non-album singles |
| "The Peach Blossom Spring (Prod. KHYO)" (무릉도원) with Dope'Doug, BlueWhale, Sojuboi | 2019 | — | SignHere Episode 2 |
| "Atypus karschi" (땅거미) with Hippy Was Gipsy | 2019 | — | Fire |
| "Used To" feat. CIFIKA | 2020 | — | Black Out |
| "Do Not Disturb" feat. So!YoON! | 2020 | — | Black Out |
| "Job" feat. Tiger JK, Qim Isle | 2020 | — | Black Out |
| "Zip" (함구) | 2020 | — | Non-album singles |
| "Uniform" feat. pH-1 | 2022 | — | Non-album singles |
| "Ghosting" (Prod. Code Kunst) (잠수이별) feat. meenoi | 2022 | 29 | Non-album singles |
| "TTFU" with Simon Dominic, Loco, Coogie | 2022 | 178 | Non-album singles |
| "Our" (우리) | 2022 | — | comma |
As featured artist
| "Mirror" (거울) (Black Nine feat. Woo Won-jae, Ann One) | 2017 | — | Non-album single |
| "Run It (Prod. by Gray)" (Jay Park feat. Woo Won-jae, Jessi) | 2018 | — | Non-album single |
| "Not At All" (Prod. by Groovy Room)" (전혀) (VINXEN feat. Woo Won-jae) | 2018 | 10 | High School Rapper 2 Final |
| "Unbreakable (Prod. By IOAH)" (Swings feat. Woo Won-jae) | 2018 | — | Crumbs Mixtape Vol.1 |
| "venus" (Ja Mezz feat. Woo Won-jae, MRSHLL) | 2018 | — | GOØDevil |
| "Bastard (Prod. by Sojeso)" (후레자식) (Giriboy feat. Woo Won-jae) | 2018 | — | 3 Songs |
| "How Do You Feel" (그대들은 어떤 기분이신가요) (VINXEN feat. Woo Won-jae) | 2018 | — | How Do You Feel |
| "LIVIN' LA VIDA LOCA" (NO:EL feat. Woo Won-jae) | 2018 | — | DOUBLEONOEL |
| "BLESS" (Code Kunst feat. Loco, Woo Won-jae) | 2018 | — | BLESS |
| "11" (Code Kunst feat. Woo Won-jae) | 2018 | — | BLESS |
| "Far Away" (멀리) (The Quiett feat. Hash Swan, Woo Won-jae) | 2018 | — | glow forever |
| "Hate You (Prod. Code Kunst)" (pH-1 feat. Woo Won-jae) | 2018 | 19 | Show Me the Money 777 |
| "Lips" (Coogie feat. Woo Won-jae) | 2018 | — | EMO #1 |
| "Some Beatmaker" (Loco feat. Yeesang, Woo Won-jae) | 2019 | — | HELLO |
| "now or never" (지금이 아니면) (CIFIKA feat. Crush, Woo Won-jae) | 2019 | — | now or never |
| "Go High (Prod. by Code Kunst)" (Lee Young-ji feat. Woo Won-jae, Changmo, The Quiett) | 2019 | 33 | High School Rapper 3 Finals |
| "Twilight (Prod. by Cha Cha Malone)" (Jay Park feat. Woo Won-jae, Jarv Dee) | 2019 | — | The Road Less Traveled |
| "Broken (Prod. BOYCOLD)" (Leellamarz feat. VINXEN, Woo Won-jae) | 2019 | — | MARZ 2 AMBITION |
| "GOTT" (Simon Dominic feat. MOON, Woo Won-jae, Jvcki Wai) | 2019 | 88 | No Open Flames |
| "Don't Ask Me" (물어보지마) (dress, sogumm feat. Woo Won-jae, Jane) | 2019 | — | Not my fault |
| "Spread The Love (Prod. Gray)" (Maddox feat. Woo Won-jae) | 2019 | — | SignHere Episode 6 |
| "Porter" (ADOY feat. Woo Won-jae) | 2019 | — | VIVID |
| "Stormy" (Mckdaddy feat. Woo Won-jae) | 2019 | — | sideshow |
| "I'MMA DO" (아마두) (YUMDDA, Deepflow, Paloalto, The Quiett, Simon Dominic feat. Woo Won-jae, Keem Hyo-eun, Nucksal, Huckleberry P) | 2019 | 2 | Dingo X DAMOIM (Part 2) |
| "Because of Winter" (겨울 탓) (SAAY feat. Woo Won-jae) | 2020 | — | Non-album singles |
| "MASCHEF" (PAXXWORD feat. Woo Won-jae) | 2020 | — | Non-album singles |
| "flower" (꽃) (Code Kunst feat. Jay Park, Woo Won-jae, Giriboy) | 2020 | 128 | People |
| "Won" (Nucksal feat. Woo Won-jae, ODEE) | 2020 | — | 1Q87 |
| "Out of Place" (DJ Wegun, Jay Park feat. Woo Won-jae, Sik-K) | 2020 | — | Everybody Sucks |
| "Daydreamin" (Layone feat. Sogumm, Woo Won-jae) | 2020 | 114 | Show Me the Money 9 |
| "In Self-defense" (정당방위) (Epik High feat. Woo Won-jae, Nucksal, Changmo) | 2021 | — | Non-album single |
Soundtrack appearances
| "Nostalgia" (Prod. by Woogie) (향수) | 2017 | 93 | Prison Playbook OST Part 6 |

== Filmography ==
=== Television ===
| Year | Title | Role | Notes | Ref. |
|---|---|---|---|---|
| 2017 | Show Me the Money 6 | Contestant | Top 3 | |
| 2019 | King of Mask Singer | Contestant (Starking) | | |
| 2019 | Sign Here | Judge | | |
| 2021 | Girls Planet 999 | Judge | | |

=== Web shows ===
| Year | Title | Role | Ref. |
|---|---|---|---|
| 2022–2023 | Woo Won-jae's Yomojomo | Host | |

== Awards and nominations ==
| Award | Year | Category | Nominee | Result | Ref. |
|---|---|---|---|---|---|
| Mnet Asian Music Awards | 2017 | Best Hip Hop & Urban Music | "We Are" (시차) feat. Loco, Gray | Nominated | |
| Mnet Asian Music Awards | 2022 | Best Collaboration | "Ghosting" | Nominated | |
| Melon Music Awards | 2017 | Top 10 Artists | Himself | Nominated | |
| Melon Music Awards | 2017 | Best New Artist | Himself | Nominated | |
| Melon Music Awards | 2017 | Kakao Hot Star Award | Himself | Nominated | |
| Melon Music Awards | 2017 | Best Rap/Hip Hop | "We Are" (시차) feat. Loco, Gray | Nominated | |
| Golden Disc Awards | 2018 | Digital Bonsang | "We Are" (시차) feat. Loco, Gray | Nominated | |
| Golden Disc Awards | 2018 | New Artist of the Year | Himself | Nominated | |
| Golden Disc Awards | 2018 | Global Popularity Award | Himself | Nominated | |
| Seoul Music Awards | 2018 | New Artist Award | Himself | Nominated | |
| Seoul Music Awards | 2018 | Popularity Award | Himself | Nominated | |
| Seoul Music Awards | 2018 | Hallyu Special Award | Himself | Nominated | |
| Korean Hip-hop Awards | 2018 | Hip Hop Track of the Year | "We Are" (시차) feat. Loco, Gray | Won | |
| Gaon Chart Music Awards | 2018 | New Artist of the Year (Song) | "We Are" (시차) feat. Loco, Gray | Won | |
| Gaon Chart Music Awards | 2018 | Song of the Year – September | "We Are" (시차) feat. Loco, Gray | Nominated | |
| Korean Music Awards | 2018 | Rookie of the Year | Himself | Nominated | |
| Korean Music Awards | 2018 | Song of the Year | "We Are" (시차) feat. Loco, Gray | Nominated | |
| Korean Music Awards | 2018 | Best Rap and Hip Hop Song | "We Are" (시차) feat. Loco, Gray | Won | |
