= Gray (singer) =

South Korean rapper and record producer (born 1986)

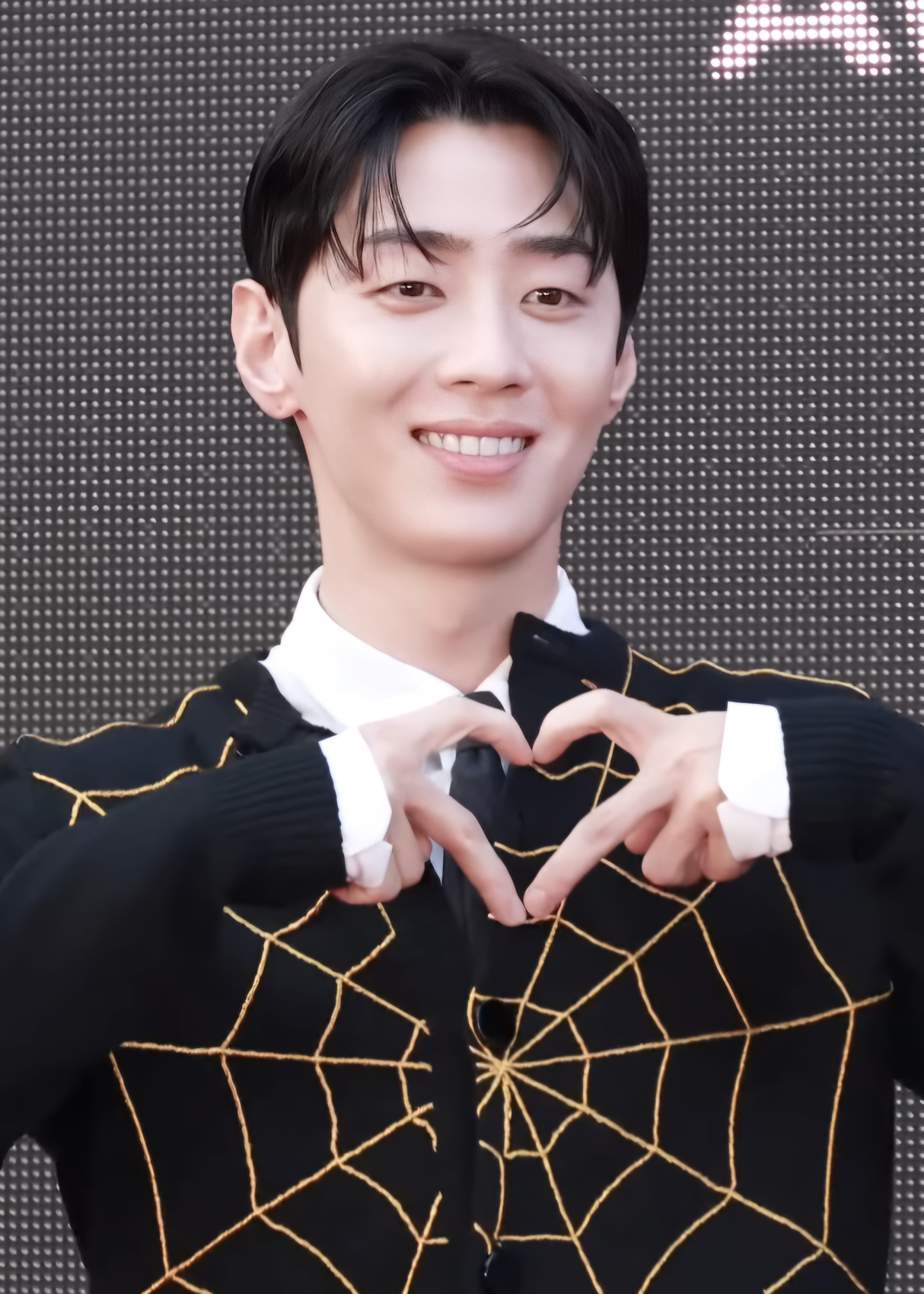
- Gray in October 2024

Background information
- Born: Lee Seong-hwa; December 8, 1986 (age 39)
- Origin: Seoul, South Korea
- Genres: Hip hop, R&B
- Occupations: Rapper; record producer
- Years active: 2012–present
- Label: duover
- Website: www.aomgofficial.com/gray

Lee Seong-hwa (Korean: 이성화; born December 8, 1986), better known by his stage name Gray (그레이; stylized as GRAY), is a South Korean rapper and record producer. In 2012, he released his debut single "Blink" (Korean: 깜빡; RR: Kkamppak). In 2021, he released his first studio album Grayground.

== Early life and career ==
Gray started composing songs when he was 17. He studied computer engineering at Hongik University. He joined AOMG in 2013 and contributed greatly to the growth of the label. He produced many hit songs such as Woo's "We Are" as well as high-quality hip-hop tracks such as Jay Park's "On It".

It was revealed that Gray's exclusive contract with AOMG ended in March 2024. After 13 years, he has decided to leave the label.

On May 31, 2024, it was announced that Gray co-founded the independent label "duover" with Code Kunst and Woo Won-jae, with the three artists serving as co-CEOs and former AOMG planning and production director Hwang A-ram joining as general director.

== Discography ==
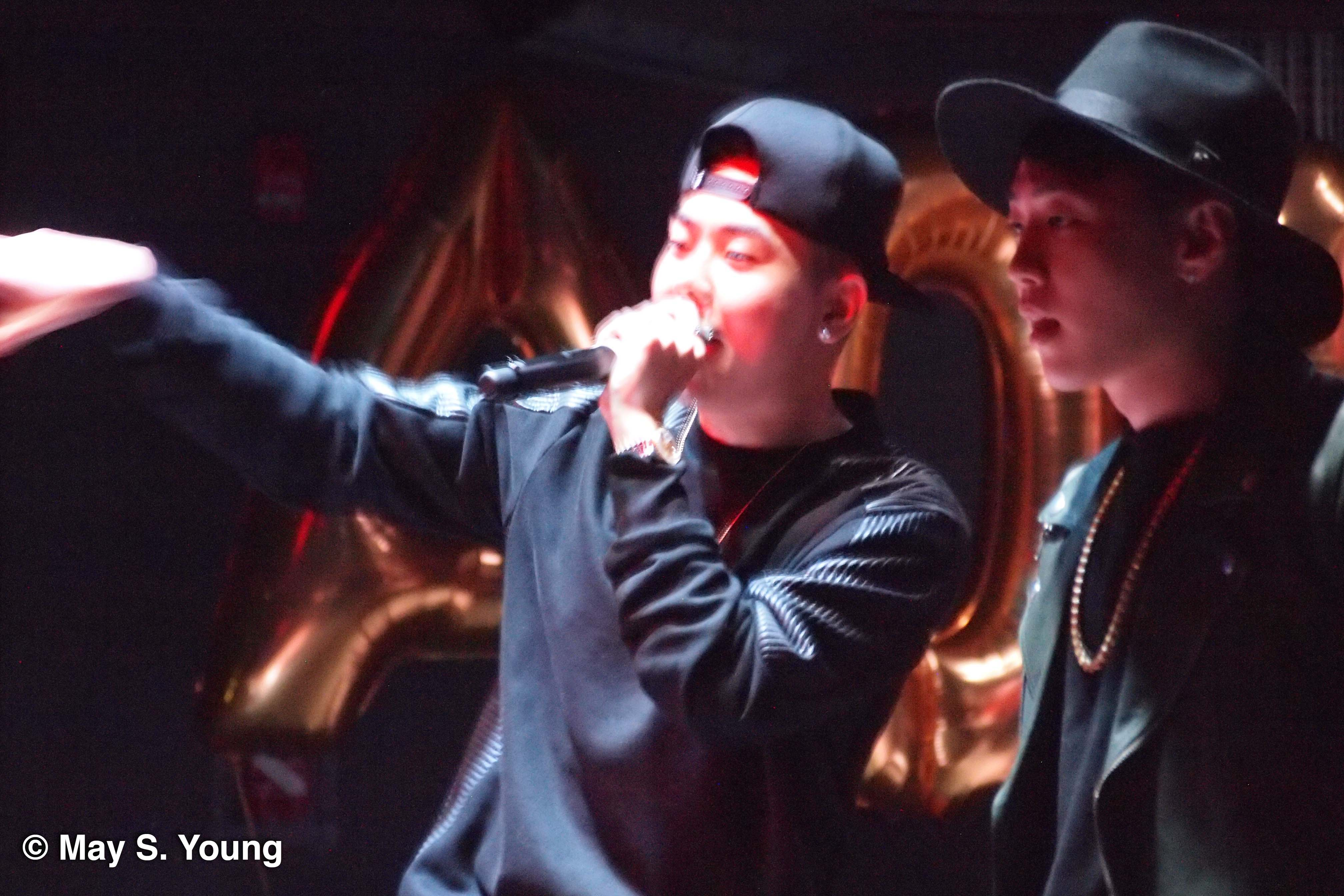
Loco and Gray (right) at the AOMG 2014 U.S. Tour

=== Studio albums ===
Title	Album details	Peak chart positions	Sales
Title	Album details	KOR	Sales
Grayground	Released: August 17, 2021; Label: AOMG; Format: CD, digital download	14	KOR: 4,500

=== Maxi single ===
Title	Details
Call Me Gray	Released: October 25, 2013; Label: AOMG; Format: CD, digital download

=== Singles ===
Title	Year	Peak chart positions	Album
Title	Year	KOR	Album
"Blink" (깜빡) feat. Zion.T, Crucial Star	2012	—	Non-album singles
"Blink (Remix)" feat. Crush, Elo, Jinbo	2013	—	Non-album singles
"Dangerous" (위험해)	2013	67	Call Me Gray
"Just Do It" (하기나 해) feat. Loco	2015	12	Non-album singles
"Good" with Loco, feat. Elo	2016	1	Non-album singles
"Comfortable" (맘 편히) with Simon Dominic, One	2016	1	Show Me the Money 5 Episode 2
"Summer Night (Remix)" feat. Hoody	2016	17	Non-album single
"I'm Fine" (잘) with Sleepy, Loco, Hoody	2017	15	Hyena on the Keyboard
"El Tornado" with Jay Park	2018	—	Non-album singles
"Upside Down" (뒤집어버려) with Jay Park, Simon Dominic, Loco	2018	89	Non-album singles
"Late Night" with Loco	2018	76	Non-album singles
"TMI"	2019	102	Non-album singles
"Stay the Night" feat. DeVita	2020	111	Stay the Night (She is My Type X Gray)
"Connected"	2021	—	Non-album single
"I Don't Love You"	2021	121	Grayground
"Make Love" feat. Zion.T	2021	150	Grayground
"Party for the Night" feat. Loco, Lee Hi	2021	—	Grayground
"Sweaty" with Loco and Coogie	2022	131	Street Man Fighter OST Vol. 3
"—" denotes release did not chart.

=== As a featured artist ===
Title	Year	Artist(s)	Album
"Drinks Up"	2011	Mainstream (ft. Gray)	Digital single
"Love, Life, Rap"	2013	P-Type (ft. Gray)	Digital single
"See The Light"	2013	Loco (ft. Gray)	Digital single
"Wish U Well"	2013	Double K (ft. Gray)	Nom (놈)
"Let's Get It On"	2013	G-Slow (ft. Swings, Gray)	Digital single
"A Real Lady"	2013	Swings (ft. Beenzino, Zion.T, Gray)	Digital single
"Invincible" (못 이겨)	2013	Swings (ft. Gray)	Digital single
"Victorious 2" (이겨낼거야 2)	2014	Swings (ft. Gray)	Mood Swings II, Pt. 1: Major Depression
"No Manners" (무례하게)	2014	Loco (ft. Gray)	Locomotive
"If I" (좋겠어)	2014	Loco (ft. Gray)	Locomotive
"Lucid Dream" (자각몽)	2014	Wutan (ft. Gray)	Digital single
"Whatever You Do"	2014	Crush (ft. Gray)	Crush On You
"Evolution"	2014	Jay Park (ft. Gray)	Evolution
"Metronome"	2014	Jay Park (ft. Simon Dominic, Gray)	Evolution
"Success Crazed" (미친놈)	2014	Jay Park (ft. Simon Dominic, Trinidad James, Loco, Gray)	Evolution
"Parachute"	2014	Elo (ft. Gray)	Digital single
"Parachute [Cool Summer Remix]"	2015	Elo (ft. Gray)	Digital single
"Respect"	2015	Loco (ft. Gray)	Digital single
"Awesome"	2015	Loco (ft. Gray)	Digital single
"My Last"	2015	Jay Park (ft. Loco, Gray)	Worldwide
"Don't Try Me"	2015	Jay Park (ft. Ugly Duck, Gray)	Worldwide
"이제는 떳떳하다"	2015	TakeOne (ft. Gray, Crucial Star, Black Gosi, MC Meta, Lolly)	Digital single
"You Always" (넌 언제나)	2016	Simon D (ft. Hoody, Gray)	Two Yoo Project Sugar Man
"Always On My Grind"	2016	AOMG	Follow The Movement Tour
"GOOD"	2016	Loco & Gray (ft. Elo)	Digital Single
"Comfortable"	2016	One, Gray, Simon Dominic	Show Me The Money 5
"DAY N NIGHT"	2016	Elo (ft. Gray)	8 Femmes
"On My Way"	2016	Swings (ft. Gray, BewhY)	Mood Swings II, Pt. 3: Psychotherapy
"Drive"	2016	Jay Park (ft. Gray)	Everything You Wanted
"1999"	2016	G2 (ft. Gray)	G2's Life, Pt. 1
"Call Me"	2017	Dayday (ft. Gray, Jay Park)	All Day Every Day
"Summer Go Loco"	2017	Loco (ft. Gray)	Summer Go Loco
"We Are" (시차)	2017	Woo Won-Jae (ft. Gray, Loco)	Digital Single
"Wang Like Alexander" (알렉산더처럼 왕)	2018	Hash Swan (ft. Gray)	Alexandrite
"Action!"	2018	DPR Live (ft. Gray)	Digital Single
"Dally" (달리)	2018	Hyolyn (ft.Gray)	Digital Single
"RUN"	2018	Lee Jin-ah (ft. Gray)	Jinah Restaurant Full Course
"How To Love" (Thai song)	2020	Ally (ft. Gray)	Digital single
"All Your Fault" (네 잘못이야)	2021	Yugyeom (ft. Gray)	Point of View: U

=== As producer ===
Title	Year	Artist	Album
"I'm Her"	2012	KittiB	Digital single
"Hongdae Blues" (홍대 블루스)	2012	Stello (ft. Rbii)	Digital single
"Plastic Girl"	2012	Stello (ft. Jeongbo)	Digital single
"The Way Home"	2012	Stello (ft. Yoon Hyeon-jun)	Digital single
"You're Not A Lady"	2012	Jerry.K (ft. Zion.T)	True Self
"Red Dress"	2012	Crush	Digital single
"Without You"	2013	Infinite H (ft. Zion.T)	Fly High
"Invincible" (못 이겨)	2013	Swings (ft. Gray)	#1, Vol. 2
"Are You Listening? (듣고 있어?)"	2013	Swings	#1, Vol. 2
"Blur"	2013	Elo (ft. Loco)	Digital single
"Two Melodies" (뻔한 멜로디)	2013	Zion.T (ft. Crush)	Red Light
"Click Me"	2013	Zion.T (ft. Dok2)	Red Light
"Parachute"	2013	Elo (ft. Gray)	Digital single
"Take Care"	2013	Loco (ft. Park Na-rae of Spica)	Digital single
"Love, Life, Rap"	2013	P-Type (ft. Gray)	Digital single
"A Real Lady"	2013	Swings (ft. Beenzino, Zion.T, & Gray)	Digital single
"Feel Like I'm Back" (우울증)	2013	Crucial Star	Drawing #2: A Better Man
"Good Vibes Only"	2013	Dok2 (ft. Gray)	Ruthless, the Album
"No More (G-Mix)"	2013	Dok2 (ft. Crush & Loco)	Ruthless, the Album
"Wish U Well"	2013	Double K (ft. Gray)	Nom (놈)
"If I Were U"	2013	Yoon Dae-jang	Digital single
"See The Light"	2013	Loco (ft. Gray)	Digital single
"Let's Get It On"	2013	G-Slow (ft. Swings & Gray)	Digital single
"Shower Later"	2014	Gary	Mr. Gae
Mizuno CF	2014	Gary	Advertisement
"Victorious 2" (이겨낼거야 2)	2014	Swings (ft. Gray)	Mood Swings II, Pt. 1: Major Depression (감정기복 II, Pt. 1: 주요 우울증)
"Major Depression" (주요 우울증)	2014	Swings (ft. Lovey)	Mood Swings II, Pt. 1: Major Depression (감정기복 II, Pt. 1: 주요 우울증)
"Hot Summer"	2014	B-Free	Hot Summer
"Metronome"	2014	Jay Park (ft. Simon Dominic & Gray)	Digital single
"Go Hard"	2014	Illionaire Records (ft. Zion.T)	Digital single
"Whatever You Do"	2014	Crush (ft. Gray)	Crush On You
"Give It To Me"	2014	Crush (ft. Jay Park & Simon Dominic)	Crush On You
"As You Are Living Your Life" (살다가보면)	2014	Jung In	High School King of Savvy OST Part.2
"NaNa"	2014	Jay Park	Digital single
"Pool Party"	2014	Swings (ft. Yoon Jong-shin, Seulong, & G.NA)	Digital single
"The Promise"	2014	Jay Park	Digital single
"Taekwondo"	2014	Jay Park	Digital single
"A Real Man"	2014	Swings & Ailee	Digital single
"Evolution"	2014	Jay Park (ft. Gray)	Evolution
"Who The F*ck is U"	2014	Jay Park (ft. TakeOne & B-Free)	Evolution
"Success Crazed" (미친놈)	2014	Jay Park (ft. Simon Dominic, Trinidad James, Loco, & Gray)	Evolution
"Lucid Dream" (자각몽)	2014	Wutan (ft. Gray)	Digital single
"Hands Up" (손바닥을 보여줘)	2014	Loco (ft. Crush)	Locomotive
"Hold Me Tight" (감아)	2014	Loco (ft. Crush)	Locomotive
"You Don't Know" (니가 모르게)	2014	Loco	Locomotive
"Thinking About You" (자꾸 생각나)	2014	Loco (ft. Jay Park)	Locomotive
"No Manners" (무례하게)	2014	Loco (ft. Gray)	Locomotive
"If I" (좋겠어)	2014	Loco (ft. Gray)	Locomotive
"Your Love"	2015	Elo (ft. The Quiett)	Digital single
"Alright"	2015	Shinhwa	We
"All I Got Time For"	2015	Jay Park	Digital single
"Unpretty Dreams"	2015	Jessi	Unpretty Rapstar
"Ayo"	2015	Lydia Paek	Digital single
"Sex Trip"	2015	Jay Park	Digital single
"MOMMAE" (몸매)	2015	Jay Park	Digital single
"Whatever"	2015	Ugly Duck (ft. Mayson the Soul, U-Turn)	Digital single
"Respect"	2015	Loco (ft. Gray)	Digital single
"Won & Only"	2015	Simon Dominic (ft. Jay Park)	Won & Only
"Simon Dominic" (사이먼 도미닉)	2015	Simon Dominic	Won & Only
"Money Don't Lie (돈은 거짓말 안 해) (Re-mastered)"	2015	Simon Dominic	Won & Only
"Lonely Night (GRAY Remix)	2015	Simon Dominic (ft. Elo)	Won & Only
"Respect"	2015	Sik-K, Lilboi, Geegoin (ft. Loco, Gray, DJ Pumkin)	Show Me The Money 4
"ON IT + BO$$"	2015	Lil Boi	Show Me The Money 4
"Awesome"	2015	Loco (ft. Gray, Jay Park)	Awesome
"We Up There 2"	2015	Loco (ft. C Jamm, Jay Park)	Awesome
"Don't Try Me"	2015	Jay Park (ft. Ugly Duck, Gray)	Worldwide
"MOMMAE (remix)"	2015	Jay Park (ft. Crush, Simon Dominic, Honey Cocaine)	Worldwide
"On It"	2015	Jay Park (ft. DJ Wegun)	Worldwide
"Seattle 2 Seoul"	2015	Jay Park	Worldwide
"In This B*tch"	2015	Jay Park	Worldwide
"Eat, Pray, Love"	2015	Dynamic Duo	Grand Carnival
"Watch"	2015	Swings (ft. Black Nut)	Levitate
"Re:Birth/A Piece of Cake (누워서 떡 먹기)"	2015	Ugly Duck & DJ Wegun	Digital single
"Lonely Night"	2015	Gary (ft. Gaeko)	Digital single
"Always On My Grind"	2016	AOMG	Follow The Movement Tour
"Bad Vibes Lonely"	2016	Dok2 (ft. Dean)	Digital single
"You Always" (넌 언제나)	2016	Simon Dominic (ft. Hoody, Gray)	Two Yoo Project Sugar Man
"Like You"	2016	Hoody	Digital single
"Heartbreak Hotel"	2016	Tiffany Hwang (ft. Simon Dominic)	Digital single
"GOOD"	2016	Loco & Gray (ft. Elo)	Digital single
"Not The Same Person You Used To Know" (니가 알던 내가 아냐)	2016	BewhY, G2, One (ft. Simon Dominic)	Show Me the Money 5
"Comfortable"	2016	One, Gray, Simon Dominic	Show Me the Money 5
"Forever"	2016	BewhY	Show Me the Money 5
"자화상 pt.2 (Fake)"	2016	BewhY	Show Me the Money 5
"Day Day"	2016	BewhY (ft. Jay Park)	Show Me the Money 5
"Not The Same Person You Used To Know (니가 알던 내가 아냐) [Remix]"	2016	Jay Park & Ugly Duck (ft. Loco, Dayday, Simon Dominic)	Scene Stealers
"ROSE"	2016	Elo	8 Femmes
"The End"	2016	Elo (ft. Paloalto)	8 Femmes
"DAY N NIGHT"	2016	Elo (ft. Gray)	8 Femmes
"Parachute [Cool Summer Remix]"	2016	Elo (ft. Gray)	8 Femmes
"Angel"	2016	Elo (ft. Simon Dominic)	8 Femmes
"On My Way"	2016	Swings (ft. Gray, BewhY)	Mood Swings II, Pt. 3: Psychotherapy
"Your Soul"	2016	Swings	Mood Swings II, Pt. 3: Psychotherapy
"Drive"	2016	Jay Park (ft. Gray)	Everything You Wanted
"Your Eyes"	2016	Hoody (ft. Jay Park)	On and On
"The Light"	2016	Hoody	On and On
"Like You"	2016	Hoody	On and On
"Need U"	2016	Hoody (ft. Dok2)	On and On
"1999"	2016	G2 (ft. Gray)	G2's Life, Pt. 1
"막다른 길"	2016	TakeOne (ft. Elo, Stella Jang)	녹색이념
"Knockin' at the Door"	2017	G2	G2's Life, Pt. 2
"A.O.M.G"	2017	Loco	Bleached
"지나쳐"	2017	Loco (ft. Dean)	Bleached
"Call Me"	2017	Dayday (ft. Gray, Jay Park)	All Day Every Day
"Curtain Call"	2017	BewhY	The Blind Star
"Red Carpet"	2017	BewhY	The Blind Star
"My Star"	2017	BewhY	The Blind Star
"Wright Brothers"	2017	BewhY (ft. CJamm)	The Blind Star
"We Are" (시차)	2017	Woo Won-Jae (ft. Gray, Loco)	Digital Single
"I'm Fine" (잘)	2017	Gray (ft. Sleepy, Loco, Hoody)	Hyenas on The Keyboard - Single
"11"	2017	Wanna One (Prod. Dynamic Duo)	1÷x=1 (Undivided)
"Me In"	2018	Bang Jae-min (feat. Chancellor)	Top Management OST
"119"	2018	Nafla, pH-1, Kid Milli, OLNL, Loopy, Superbee	Show Me the Money 777 Episode 4
"Too Much"	2019	BIGONE (Feat.PENOMECO) (Prod. GRAY)	PEACH BLOSSOM
"Angel"	2020	OnlyOneOf (Prod. GRAY)	Produced by [ ] Part 1
"I Want U Around"	2021	Yugyeom (Feat. DeVita)	Point of View: U
"Running Through The Rain"	2021	Yugyeom	Point of View: U
"All Your Fault"	2021	Yugyeom (Feat. Gray)	Point of View: U
"All About U"	2021	Yugyeom (Feat. Loco)	Point of View: U
"When U Fall"	2021	Yugyeom	Point of View: U
"Dingo X SGBOYZ - ?"	2021	SGBOYZ (Jay Park, Don Mills, Loco, Nucksal) (Prod. GRAY)	Digital Single
21世紀少年 -21st Century Boy-	2022	YOUYA (Music. YOUYA, GRAY)	Digital Single

== Filmography ==
=== Film ===
Year	Title	Role	Notes	Ref.
2023	Ballerina	Music director	Netflix Film	
2026	Project Y	Music director		

=== Television ===
Year	Program	Notes
2015	You Hee-yeol's Sketchbook	Guest with Loco, Jay Park
2016	Show Me the Money 5	Producer with Simon Dominic
2017	You Hee-yeol's Sketchbook	Guest with Loco, Elo
2017	Hyena on the Keyboard	Contestant with Loco, Hoody, Sleepy
2018	A Battle of One Voice: 300	Contestant with Loco
2018	The Call (South Korean TV series)	Contestant with Loco
2018	Hyena on the Keyboard	Contestant with Rhythm Power
2018	After Mom is Asleep	Guest with Simon Dominic, Loco
2018	Eat In Style	
2019	I Can See Your Voice	Guest with Loco, Simon Dominic, Code Kunst
2019	Sign Here	Judge
2019	Not the Same Person You Used to Know	Contestant with Loco, Swings, DJ Pumkin
2021	Come Back Home	Guest with Simon Dominic
2021	Sixth Sense 2	Guest with Loco
2021	Knowing Bros	Guest with Code Kunst, Lee Hi, Simon Dominic
2021	Show Me the Money 10	Producer with Mino
2026	Show Me the Money 12	Judge

=== Music video appearances ===
Year	Song Title	Artist	Ref.
2021	"Red Lipstick"	Lee Hi (Feat. Yoon Mirae)	

== Awards and nominations ==
Year	Awards ceremony	Category	Nominee	Result	Ref.
2017	Korean Hip-hop Awards	Producer of the Year	Himself	Nominated	
2018	Korean Hip-hop Awards	Producer of the Year	Himself	Nominated	
2019	Korean Hip-hop Awards	Producer of the Year	Himself	Nominated	
2023	Blue Dragon Film Awards	Best Music	Balerina	Nominated	
