= Punchnello =

South Korean rapper (born 1997)

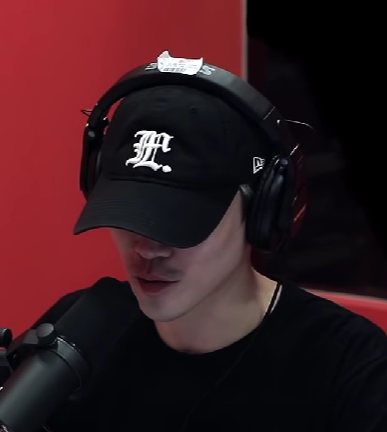

Background information
- Born: Lee Yeong-sin; May 28, 1997 (age 28); Seoul, South Korea
- Genres: Hip hop
- Occupation: Rapper
- Years active: 2016–present
- Label: AOMG

Korean name
- Hangul: 이영신
- RR: I Yeongsin
- MR: I Yŏngsin

Lee Yeong-sin (Korean: 이영신; born May 28, 1997), better known by his stage name Punchnello (펀치넬로), is a South Korean rapper. He released his first extended play, Ordinary, in 2019. Later that year, he won the rap competition show Show Me the Money 8.

== Discography ==
=== Studio albums ===
| Title | Details |
|---|---|
| Demon Youth | Released: July 30, 2021; Label: AOMG; Formats: CD, digital download |

=== Extended plays ===
| Title | Details | Peak chart positions | Sales |
| Title | Details | KOR | Sales |
|---|---|---|---|
| Ordinary | Released: January 28, 2019; Label: AOMG; Formats: CD, digital download | 45 | —N/a |

=== Singles ===
| Title | Year | Peak chart positions | Sales | Album |
| Title | Year | KOR | Sales | Album |
As lead artist
| "Corona" feat. Crush | 2016 | — | —N/a | Lime single album |
| "Worth It" feat. Hoody | 2016 | — | —N/a | Non-album singles |
| "Detox" | 2017 | — | —N/a | Non-album singles |
| "Absinthe" | 2019 | — | —N/a | Non-album singles |
| "Blue Hawaii" feat. Crush, Penomeco | 2019 | — | —N/a | Ordinary |
| "Winter Blossom" feat. SAAY | 2019 | — | —N/a | Ordinary |
| "23" feat. Sam Kim | 2019 | — | —N/a | Non-album single |
| "Magma" feat. Hangzoo, Bewhy | 2019 | — | —N/a | Show Me the Money 8 OST |
| "Jungle" (정글) feat. Penomeco, Sam Kim | 2019 | — | —N/a | Show Me the Money 8 OST |
| "Doodle" (낙서) feat. Baek Ye-rin | 2019 | 84 | —N/a | Non-album singles |
| "Us" feat. Meenoi | 2020 | — | —N/a | Non-album singles |
| "Fine!" feat. Kid Milli | 2020 | — | —N/a | Non-album singles |
| "Back" | 2021 | — | —N/a | Demon Youth |
| "Boy In The Mirror" feat. Kidd King | 2021 | — | —N/a | Demon Youth |
| "Who Need" | 2021 | — | —N/a | Demon Youth |
Collaborations
| "2night" with Eddy Kim | 2016 | — | —N/a | Entourage OST |
| "S.M.T.M (Show Me the Money)" with Sleepy, Hash Swan, Olltii, Penomeco, Black Nine, Dok2, Ignito | 2017 | 82 | KOR: 45,420 | Show Me the Money 6 OST |
| "BAMN" with Jjangyou, Zene the Zilla, Mckdaddy | 2019 | 77 | —N/a | Show Me the Money 8 OST |
| "Comfortable" (편해) with Donutman | 2019 | — | —N/a | Show Me the Money 8 OST |

== Filmography ==
=== Television ===
| Year | Title | Role | Notes | Ref. |
|---|---|---|---|---|
| 2017 | Show Me the Money 6 | Himself | Withdrew from competition | |
| 2019 | Show Me the Money 8 | Himself | Winner | |
