= Loco (rapper) =

South Korean rapper (born 1989)

Loco 로꼬
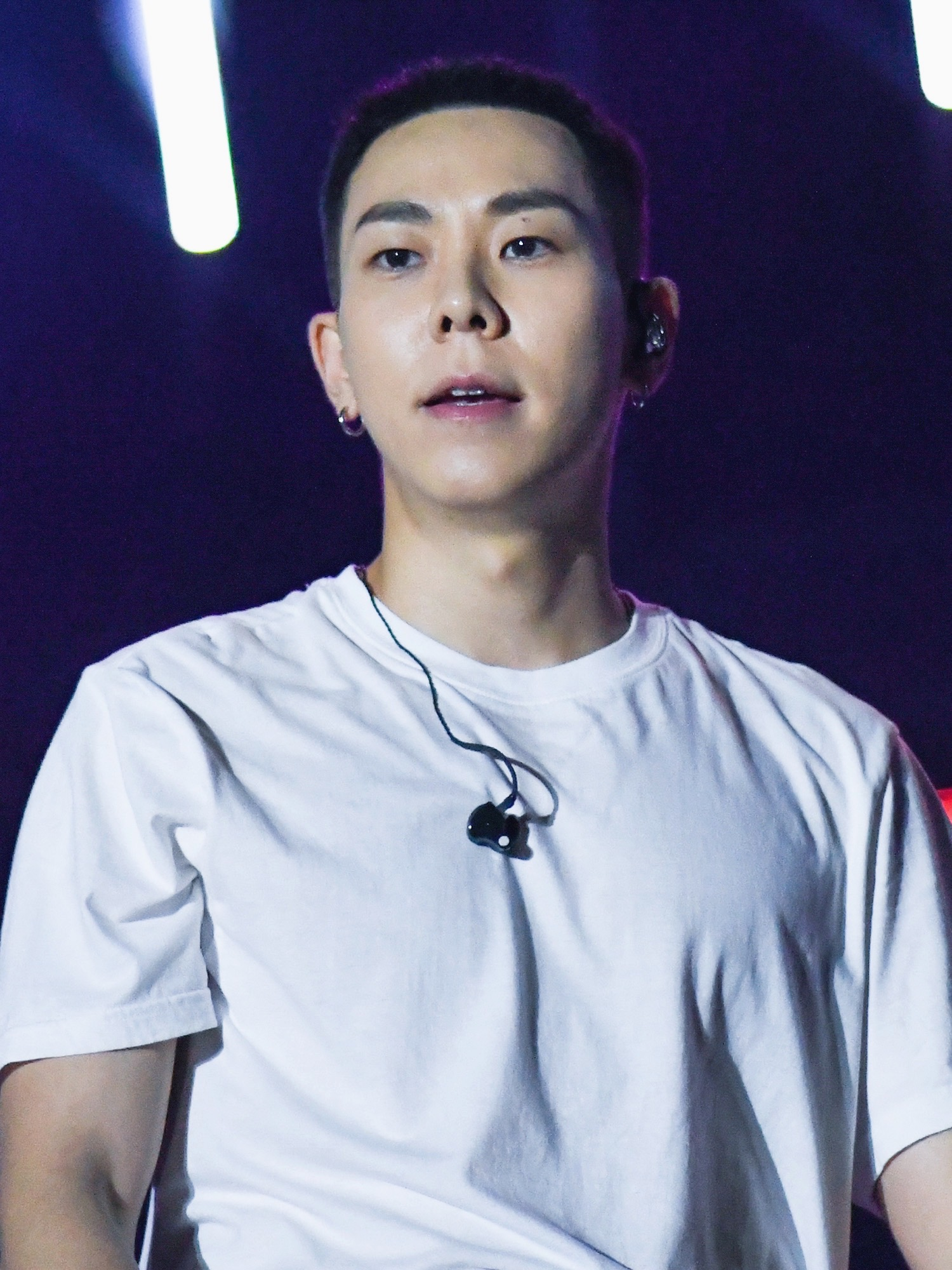
- Loco at The Cry Ground Festival, May 2022

Background information
- Born: Kwon Hyuk-woo; December 25, 1989 (age 36); Seoul, South Korea
- Genres: K-pop; hip hop
- Occupation: Rapper
- Years active: 2012–present
- Label: AOMG
- Spouse: Unknown (m. 2022)
- Website: www.aomgofficial.com/loco

Korean name
- Hangul: 권혁우
- RR: Gwon Hyeoku
- MR: Kwŏn Hyŏgu

Kwon Hyuk-woo (Korean: 권혁우; born December 25, 1989), better known by his stage name Loco (로꼬), is a South Korean rapper signed to hip hop label AOMG. His name "loco" means "crazy" in Spanish. He won the first season of Mnet's rap competition Show Me the Money in 2012.

== Personal life ==
As of 2026, he is legally married to a non-celebrity.

== Discography ==
=== Studio albums ===
Title	Album details	Peak chart position	Sales
Title	Album details	KOR	Sales
Bleached	Released: May 25, 2017; Label: AOMG, LOEN Entertainment; Formats: CD, digital download; Track list: 1. "A.O.M.G"; 2. "Movie Shoot" (featuring DPR Live); 3. "So Bad" (featuring Sik-K); 4. "Tiger"; 5. "Like I'm Saying"; 6. "Too Much" (featuring Dean); 7. "I Was Living Hard" (CD-Skit only); 8. "Brighten Your Night"; 9. "Da Da Da" (featuring Hoody); 10. "Still" (featuring Crush); 11. "You Too" (featuring Cha Cha Malone); 12. "Rewind" (featuring Sumin)	10	KOR: 3,127+
Weak	Released: October 17, 2023; Label: AOMG; Formats: CD, digital download	70	KOR: 1,909
Scraps	Released: July 8, 2025; Label: Locomotive; Formats: CD, digital download, streaming	62	KOR: 1,398

=== Extended plays ===
Title	Album details	Peak chart position	Sales
Title	Album details	KOR	Sales
Locomotive	Released: November 28, 2014; Label: AOMG, LOEN; Formats: CD, digital download; Track list: 1. Hands Up (featuring Crush); 2. Act Serious (featuring Ugly Duck & DJ Wegun); 3. You Don't Know; 4. Thinking About You (featuring Jay Park); 5. No Manners (featuring Gray); 6. High (featuring Konsoul); 7. If I (featuring Gray); 8. Growing Up (featuring Elo); 9. Hold Me Tight (featuring Crush)	12	KOR: 1,336+
Summer Go Loco	Released: August 18, 2017; Label: AOMG, LOEN; Formats: CD, digital download; Track list: 1. Oppa; 2. Summer Go Loco (feat. Gray); 3. Party Band (feat. Punchnello, Thur); 4. Alright, Summer Time (feat. Sam Kim)	—	—N/a
Hello	Released: February 7, 2019; Label: AOMG, Kakao M; Formats: CD, digital download; Track list: 1. NOTHING; 2. It's been a while (feat. Zion.T); 3. Tangled Up (feat. pH-1); 4. Some Beatmaker (feat. Woo & yeesang); 5. Too Fast (feat. Paloalto); 6. HOW	10	KOR: 4,584+
Some Time	Released: October 14, 2020; Label: AOMG, Kakao M; Formats: CD, digital download; Track list: 1. Return; 2. Can't Sleep (feat. Heize); 3. Meeting Room; 4. Only Now (feat. Car, the Garden)	—	—N/a
"—" denotes releases that did not chart.

=== Singles ===
Title	Year	Peak chart positions			Sales	Album
Title	Year	KOR Circle	KOR Billboard	US World	Sales	Album
As lead artist
"See the Light" (featuring Gray)	2012	—	—	—	—N/a	Non-album singles
"No More" (featuring Crush)	2012	—	—	—	—N/a	Non-album singles
"Take Care" (featuring Park Narae)	2013	—	—	—	—N/a	Non-album singles
"Hold Me Tight" (featuring Crush)	2014	4	7	—	KOR: 926,128	Locomotive
"Respect" (featuring Gray & DJ Pumkin)	2015	33	—N/a	—	KOR: 251,835	Non-album singles
"Awesome" (featuring Jay Park & Gray)	2015	17	—N/a	—	KOR: 189,342	Non-album singles
"You Too" (너도) (featuring Cha Cha Malone)	2016	5	—N/a	—	KOR: 442,275	Non-album singles
"Still" (남아있어) (featuring Crush)	2016	6	—N/a	—	KOR: 291,499	Non-album singles
"Too Much" (지나쳐) (featuring Dean)	2017	12	19	—	KOR: 367,499	Bleached
"Summer Go Loco" (featuring Gray)	2017	53	67	—	KOR: 56,485	Summer Go Loco
"Post It" (나타나줘) (featuring Jay Park)	2018	39	37	—	—N/a	Non-album singles
"It Takes Time" (시간이 들겠지) (featuring Colde)	2018	2	—	—	—N/a	Non-album singles
"Late Night" (featuring Gray)	2018	76	—	—	—N/a	Non-album singles
"It's Been a While" (오랜만이야) (featuring Zion.T)	2019	17	—	—	—N/a	Hello
"Can't Sleep" (잠이 들어야) (featuring Heize)	2020	36	—	—	—N/a	Some Time
"Not OK" (featuring Minnie)	2023	195	—	—	—N/a	Weak
Collaborations
"Good" (with Gray, featuring Elo)	2016	1	—N/a	—	KOR: 358,675	Non-album singles
"Think About' Chu" (with Sam Kim)	2017	16	—N/a	—	KOR: 197,273	Non-album singles
"Don't Give It to Me" (주지마) (with Hwasa)	2018	1	1	—	KOR: 2,500,000	Hyena on the Keyboard Part.4
"Upside Down" (with Jay Park, Simon Dominic and Gray)	2018	89	—	—	—N/a	Non-album single
"Young" (with Baekhyun)	2018	11	18	4	—N/a	Station X 0
"Love" (러브) (with Lee Sung-kyung)	2021	25	—	—	—N/a	Duet Mate
"Somebody!" (with Hwasa)	2022	51	22	—	—N/a	Somebody
"Sweaty" (with Gray and Coogie)	2022	131	—	—	—N/a	Street Man Fighter
As featured artist
"My Last" (Jay Park featuring Loco and Gray)	2015	30	—N/a	19	KOR: 249,588	₩orld ₩ide
"Can't Help Myself" (못참겠어) (Eric Nam featuring Loco)	2016	20	—N/a	4	KOR: 250,063	Non-album single
"Double Dip" (Far East Movement featuring Soulja Boy & Loco)	2016	—	—N/a	—	—N/a	Identity
"All I Wanna Do (K)" (Jay Park featuring Hoody & Loco)	2016	176	37	9	KOR: 2,500,000	Everything You Wanted
"That Girl" (Jung Yong-hwa featuring Loco)	2017	77	—	—	KOR: 26,909	Do Disturb
"Outerspace" (Kang Daniel featuring Loco)	2021	80	—	—	—N/a	Non-album single
"Smeraldo Garden Marching Band" (Jimin featuring Loco)	2024	44	24	—	—N/a	Muse
"—" denotes releases that did not chart or were not released in that region. Notes: Billboard Korea Kpop Hot 100 was introduced in August 2011 and discontinued in July 2014. The chart was re-established on May 29, 2017.

=== Soundtrack appearances ===
Title	Year	Peak chart position	Sales	Album
Title	Year	KOR	Sales	Album
"The Virus" (with Havy T)	2013	—	—N/a	The Virus OST
"This Song" (with Mamamoo)	2014	65	—N/a	My Lovely Girl OST
"Spring Is Gone by Chance" (with Yuju)	2015	5	KOR: 2,500,000	A Girl Who Sees Smells OST
"Say Yes" (with Punch)	2016	15	KOR: 274,375	Moon Lovers: Scarlet Heart Ryeo OST
"Star (Little Prince)" (with U Sung-eun)	2018	—	—N/a	Memories of the Alhambra OST
"—" denotes releases that did not chart or were not released in that region.

== Filmography ==
=== Television ===
Year	Program	Network	Roles	Notes
2012	Show Me the Money	Mnet	Himself	Contestant and Winner
2015	Show Me the Money 4	Mnet	Himself	Judge/Producer with Jay Park
2016	My little Television	MBC	Himself	Cast member
2016	Happy Together 3	KBS2	Himself	Cast member
2017	You Hee-yeol's Sketchbook	KBS2	Himself	Cast member
2018	It's Dangerous Beyond the Blankets	MBC	Himself	Cast member
2018	Hyena On the Keyboard	KBS2	Himself	Cast member (Episodes 7-8)
2018	A Battle of One Voice: 300	tvN	Himself	Contestant with Gray (Episodes 1-)
2018	Show Me the Money 777	Mnet	Himself	Loopy 'V' Featured
2018	Radio Star (TV series)	MBC	Himself	Cast member
2020	Show Me the Money 9	Mnet	Himself	Lil Boi 'ON AIR' Featured
2021	High School Rapper (season 4)	Mnet	Himself	Judge/Producer

=== Web shows ===
Year	Title	Network	Role	Ref.
2021	Love Catcher in Seoul	TVING	Host	

=== Music video appearances ===
Year	Song Title	Artist	Ref.
2021	"Red Lipstick"	Lee Hi (Feat. Yoon Mirae)	

== Awards and nominations ==
Award	Year	Category	Nominee	Result	Ref.
Genie Music Awards	2019	Best Male Solo Artist	Loco	Nominated	
Hanteo Music Awards	2023	Special Award in Hip Hop	Loco	Nominated	
KBS Entertainment Awards	2018	Hot Issue Variety Award	Hyena on the Keyboard (with Hwasa)	Won	
MAMA Awards	2022	Best Collaboration	"Somebody!" (with Hwasa)	Nominated	
Melon Music Awards	2014	Best Rap/Hip Hop Award	"Hold Me Tight" (feat. Crush)	Nominated	
Melon Music Awards	2015	Best OST Award	"Spring Is Gone By Chance" (with Yuju)	Won	
Melon Music Awards	2015	Best Rap/Hip Hop Award	"You Don't Know"	Nominated	
Melon Music Awards	2018	Hot Trend Award	"Don't" (with Hwasa)	Won	
Melon Music Awards	2018	Hot Trend Award	"Young" (with Baekhyun)	Nominated	
Melon Music Awards	2018	Best Ballad Award	"Don't Give It To Me" (with Hwasa)	Nominated	
Seoul Music Awards	2020	R&B Hiphop Award	Loco	Nominated	
