= Coogie =

South Korean rapper (born 1994)

- Coogie in 2023

Background information
- Born: Kim Jeong-hun; January 23, 1994 (age 32); Daejeon, South Korea
- Genres: Hip hop; lo-fi; trap; R&B; pop rap
- Occupations: Rapper; songwriter
- Years active: 2018-present
- Label: duover

Kim Jeong-hun (Korean: 김정훈; born January 23, 1994), known professionally as Coogie (Korean: 쿠기), is a South Korean rapper and songwriter. He gained popularity when he appeared on Show Me The Money 777 in 2018. He signed to hip-hop label ATM Seoul where he released the studio album Up! (2020), extended plays Coogie (2018), Emo #1 (2018), and S.O.S (2019), and the mixtape I Got A Feeling (2021). In 2020, he released the single "Fadeaway" with Jvcki Wai, Paloalto, The Quiett, and Bassagong, which won Collaboration of the Year at the Korean Hip-hop Awards. He signed to AOMG in 2022.

== Early life ==
Kim Jeong-hun was born on January 23, 1994, in Daejeon. He started listening to foreign hip-hop and writing lyrics when he was in the fifth grade.

== Career ==
=== 2018–2021: Show Me the Money 777 and Up! ===
Coogie signed to ATM Seoul, a hip-hop label found by rapper Bill Stax. In March 2018, he released his debut single "HBK". In May 2018, he released his debut EP Coogie. In September 2018, he appeared on the rap competition TV show Show Me the Money 777 where he first garnered attention. He released the singles "Saimsaim" and "Watch Me Ballin'" on the show and finished in the Top 12. In December 2018, he released the EP EMO #1. "Wifey", the single from the EP featuring rapper Changmo, received positive reviews from critics.

In March 2020, Coogie released his debut studio album Up!, which received critical acclaim. In May 2020, he released the single "Fadeaway" with rappers Jvcki Wai, Paloalto, The Quiett and Bassagong, which won Collaboration of the Year at the Korean Hip-hop Awards. In 2021, he released his debut mixtape I Got A Feeling.

=== 2022: Signing to AOMG ===
In 2022, Coogie signed to hip-hop label AOMG.

On May 14, 2025, Coogie joined duover.

== Artistry ==
Coogie cited rappers Lil Uzi Vert, Famous Dex, and Rich the Kid as his biggest influence.

== Discography ==
=== Studio album ===
| Title | Details | Peak chart positions | Sales |
| Title | Details | KOR | Sales |
|---|---|---|---|
| Up! | Released: March 29, 2020; Labels: Million Market, ATM Seoul, Dreamus; Format: LP, digital download | — | —N/a |
| Upset | Released: April 30, 2025; Labels: Coogie, Kakao; Format: CD, digital download | 38 | KOR: 1,623 |

=== EPs ===
| Title | Details |
|---|---|
| Coogie | Released: May 18, 2018; Labels: ATM Seoul, Genie Music, Stone Music Entertainment; Format: Digital download |
| EMO #1 | Released: December 7, 2018; Labels: Million Market, ATM Seoul, Dreamus; Format: Digital download |
| S.O.S (with Sik-K) | Released: September 24, 2019; Labels: H1ghr Music, Million Market, ATM Seoul, Dreamus; Format: Digital download |

=== Mixtape ===
| Title | Details | Peak chart position |
| Title | Details | KOR |
|---|---|---|
| I Got a Feeling | Released: July 4, 2021; Labels: Million Market, ATM Seoul, Kakao Entertainment; Formats: CD, digital download | 24 |

=== Singles ===
| Title | Year | Peak chart position | Album |
| Title | Year | KOR | Album |
|---|---|---|---|
| "HBK" (Feat. Ted Park) | 2018 | — | Non-album single |
| "Peach" | 2018 | — | Coding Black |
| "Movin' & Movin'" (Feat. Bla$eKid) | 2018 | — | Coding Black |
| "Girls Like (Remix)" (Feat. Tommy Strate, Ja Mezz, Sik-K) | 2018 | — | Coding Black |
| "Coogie" | 2018 | — | Non-album singles |
| "Coosebumps" | 2018 | — | Non-album singles |
| "Catch Up" | 2018 | — | Preview |
| "Bouncin'" | 2018 | — | Preview |
| "Saimsaim" (사임사임) (with Superbee, D.Ark feat. Changmo) | 2018 | 7 | Show Me the Money 777 Episode 1 |
| "Watch Me Ballin'" (빌어먹을 인연; bireomeogeul inyeon) (Feat. Sik-K) | 2018 | 72 | Show Me the Money 777 Episode 3 |
| "Wifey" (Feat. Changmo) | 2018 | — | Emo #1 |
| "No Filter" (아무 말; amu mal) (with George) | 2019 | — | It's Okay to Be Sensitive 2 OST Part.2 |
| "Hooligans" (Feat. Bill Stax) | 2019 | — | Non-album single |
| "Into The Abyss" (with Suran) | 2019 | — | Abyss OST Part 1 |
| "Pipe Down!" (Feat. Superbee) | 2019 | — | Non-album singles |
| "GPS" | 2019 | — | Non-album singles |
| "Right Away" (Feat. pH-1) | 2019 | — | Up! |
| "North Face" (Feat. Jvcki Wai) | 2020 | — | Up! |
| "Fadeaway" (with Jvcki Wai, Paloalto, The Quiett, Bassagong) | 2020 | — | Non-album singles |
| "Life Goes On" (Feat. pH-1) | 2020 | — | Non-album singles |
| "Pow" (Feat. Gray) | 2021 | — (Note: "Pow" did not enter the Gaon Digital Chart but peaked at number 87 on the Gaon Download Chart.) | Non-album singles |
| "Up & Down" (Feat. Mirani, Penomeco) | 2021 | — | I Got a Feeling |
| "Fast" (with Gaeko) | 2021 | — (Note: "Fast" did not enter the Gaon Digital Chart but peaked at number 83 on the Gaon Download Chart.) | Non-album single |
| "Good Night" (Feat. Be'O) | 2022 | 63 | Re: Up |
| "Beat 'em up" | 2022 | — | Re: Up |
| "Alone" (Feat. Lee Hi) | 2022 | 138 | Non-album single |
| "Sweaty" (with Gray and Loco) | 2022 | 131 | Street Man Fighter OST Vol. 3 |
| "Right Now" (Feat. Crush) | 2023 | 82 | Non-album single |
| "눈이 와" Kwon Eunbi ft. Coogie | 2025 | — | Non-album single |

== Filmography ==
=== TV ===
| Year | Title | Role | Ref. |
|---|---|---|---|
| 2018 | Show Me the Money 777 | Contestant (Top 12) | |

== Awards and nominations ==
| Award | Year | Nominee | Category | Result | Ref. |
|---|---|---|---|---|---|
| Korean Hip-hop Awards | 2019 | Himself | New Artist of the Year | Nominated | |
| Korean Hip-hop Awards | 2021 | "Fadeaway" | Collaboration of the Year | Won | |
| Korean Hip-hop Awards | 2021 | "Fadeaway" | Music Video of the Year | Nominated | |
