= AOMG =

South Korean record label

- Parent company: CJ E&M
- Founded: 2013; 13 years ago
- Founder: Jay Park
- Distributors: Stone Music Entertainment; Genie Music; Kakao M (Note: Selected releases only)
- Genre: Hip-hop; R&B
- Country of origin: South Korea
- Official website: Official website

AOMG is a South Korean hip-hop and R&B record label founded in 2013 by rapper and singer-songwriter Jay Park. The label currently houses 20 musicians, UFC fighter Chan Sung Jung, and cartoonist Kian84.

== History ==
Above Ordinary Music Group (AOMG) is a prominent Korean hip-hop and R&B record label originating from the "Art of Movement," a Seattle-based B-Boying group which Jay Park joined in 2003, featuring members such as Dial Tone, Junior, and Cha Cha Malone.

Jay Park founded AOMG in late September 2013, and initially signed composer Jun Goon, singer and producer Gray, and Seattle affiliate Cha Cha Malone, who was a producer and dancer with Jay Park's dance crew Art of Movement. The label had its launch party on October 10, 2013, at "The A" in Seoul with Ben Baller as the host. The same month, the label released its first album, Gray's mini-album, Call Me Gray.

Artists Elo, Loco, Ugly Duck, DJ Wegun, DJ Pumkin, and Hoody joined AOMG over the next two years.

In March 2014, Simon Dominic announced that he had joined AOMG as co-CEO several months after his departure from his former label Amoeba Culture.

In January 2016, South Korean media company CJ E&M announced that it had formed a strategic partnership with AOMG. CJ E&M said in a statement that it would "support" AOMG with distribution and marketing, while AOMG would continue to control its music.

On October 30, 2017, rapper Woo Won-jae signed to the label.

On May 9, 2018, UFC fighter Jung Chan-sung (The Korean Zombie) signed to the label. On June 11, 2018, record producer Code Kunst signed to the label and released the single "Rain Bird". On July 25, 2018, Simon Dominic announced his resignation as co-CEO of AOMG with his song "Me No Jay Park".

In August 2019, AOMG's first hip-hop audition show Signhere began airing on MBN, marking the first ever hip-hop and R&B record label to have their own audition program on broadcast television. Singer-songwriter Sogumm won the show and subsequently signed to AOMG on November 1. On November 6, 2019, rapper Punchnello signed to the label.

On April 8, 2020, singer-songwriter DeVita signed to the label and released her debut EP Creme. On July 24, 2020, singer Lee Hi signed to the label after her departure from YG Entertainment and released the single "Holo". On September 4, 2020, record producer Goosebumps signed to the label and released the single "Somewhere" featuring labelmates Gray, Hoody, Elo, and DeVita.

On February 18, 2021, AOMG signed singer Yugyeom, a member of South Korean boy group Got7, following his departure from JYP Entertainment in January 2021. His "Franchise" dance video was uploaded to the label's YouTube channel on the same day. On December 31, Jay Park announced his resignation as the Co-CEO of AOMG.

On January 25, 2022, rapper Coogie signed to the label and released the single "Re:Up". On October 24, rapper Jvcki Wai signed to the label and released the single "Go Back".

On February 14, 2023, Sogumm departed from the label as her contract expired. On April 1, cartoonist Kian84 signed to the label. On April 24, AOMG established sublabel Solabeam Records that consists of DJs and producers. On November 9, singer Meenoi signed to the label. Lovelyz member Mijoo joined the company in November 2025.

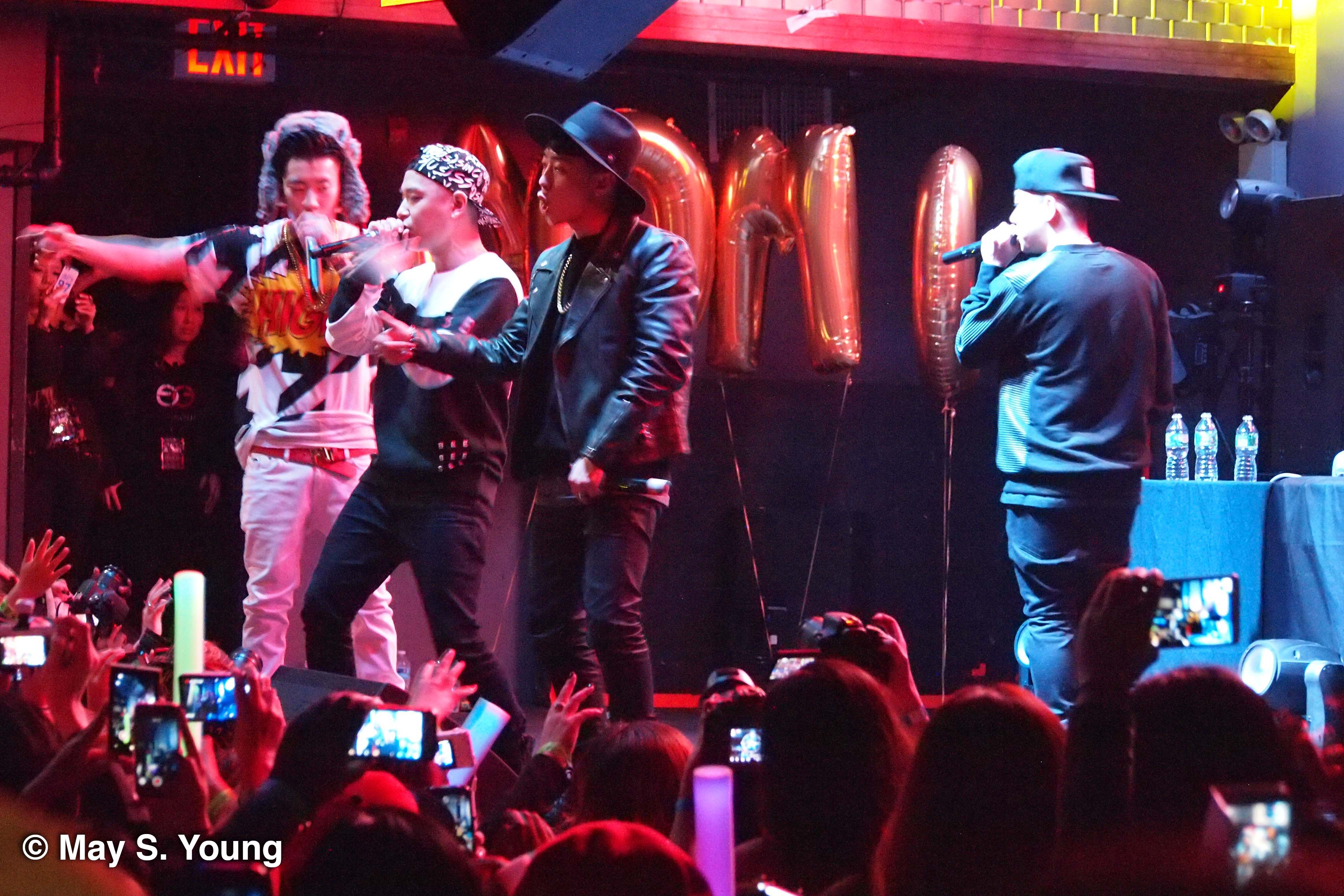
Jay Park, Simon Dominic, Gray, Loco - 2014 United States Tour

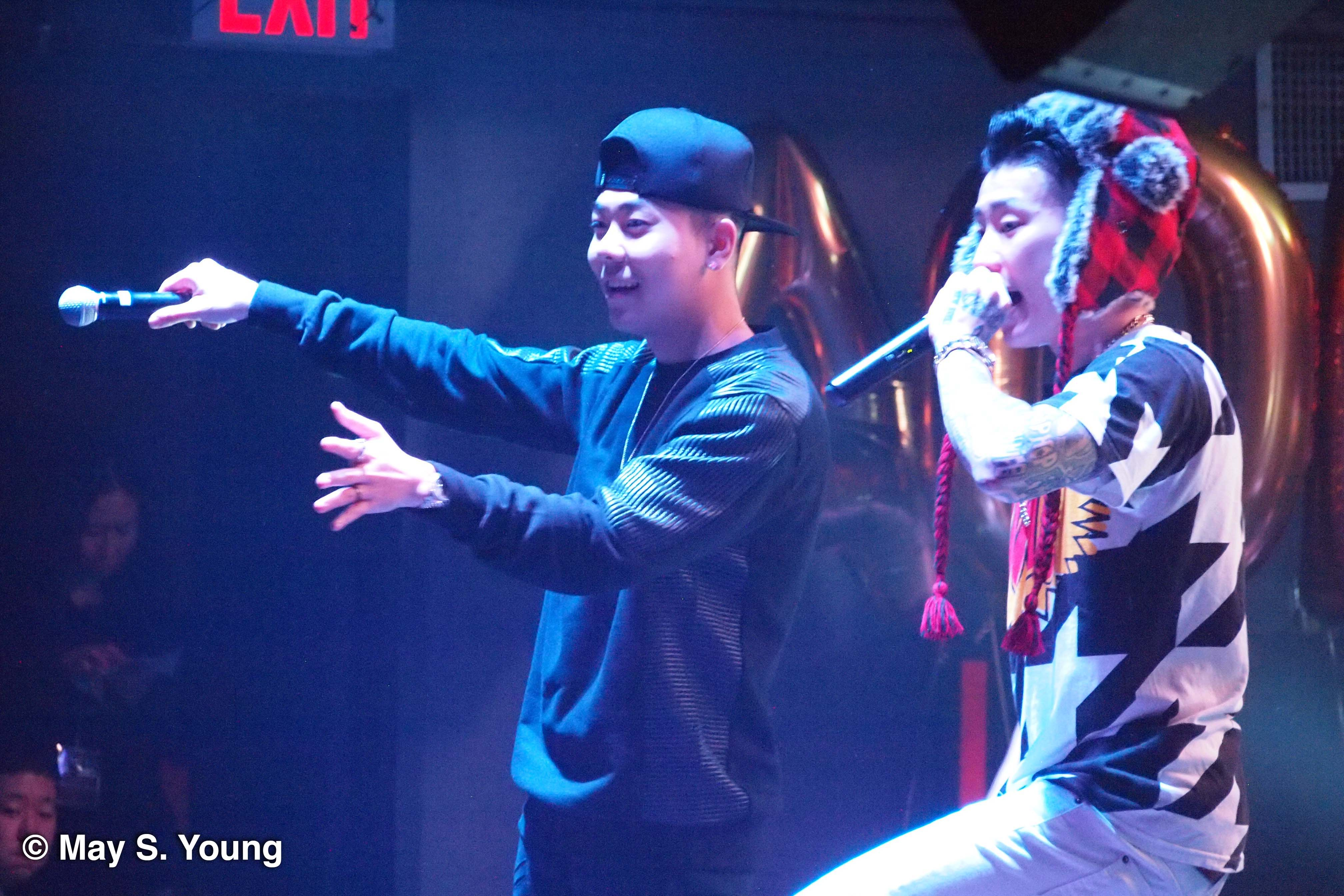
Loco and Jay Park - 2014 United States Tour

== Key people ==
- Jay Park - Founder, Advisor - Co-CEO (2014–2021)
- DJ Pumkin - CEO (2018–2024)
- Simon Dominic - Co-CEO (2014–2018)
- David Yoo - CEO (2024-Present)

== Artists ==
=== Current artists ===
- Ugly Duck
- Punchnello
- Yugyeom
- Chan Sung Jung (The Korean Zombie)
- Jvcki Wai
- Kian84
- Sikkoo
- Mijoo
- Kimkipyø
- Keyveatz

=== Former artists ===
- Jay Park (2013–2021)
- Gray (2013–2024)
- Loco (2013–2024)
- Elo (2013–2026)
- Simon Dominic (2014–2024)
- DJ Pumkin (2014–2024)
- Woo Won-jae (2017–2024)
- Sogumm (2019–2023)
- Code Kunst (2018–2024)
- Lee Hi (2020–2024)
- Cha Cha Malone
- Goosebumps (2020–2024)
- DeVita (2020–2024)
- Coogie (2022–2025)
- Meenoi (2023–2025)

== Philanthropy ==
In December 2018, AOMG announced that the profits made from "119 Remix" would be donated to organizations related to firefighting and fire accidents. In September 2019, Gray donated the song revenue (25 million won) to Seoul Metropolitan Fire & Disaster Headquarters on behalf of the artists who participated in the song.

In August 2020, AOMG donated the revenue of their online concert (around 12 million won) to Community Chest of Korea to support those affected by the COVID-19 pandemic.

== Tours ==
- AOMG 2014 United States Tour
- Follow The Movement Tour 2016

| Date | City | Country | Venue |
|---|---|---|---|
| January 29 | Seoul | South Korea | Blue Square |
| January 30 | Seoul | South Korea | Blue Square |
| February 13 | Busan | South Korea | BEXCO |
| February 21 | Daegu | South Korea | EXCO |
| April 5 | Chicago | United States | House of Blues |
| April 8 | New York | United States | PlayStation Theater |
| April 11 | Houston | United States | Warehouse Live |
| April 12 | Dallas | United States | The Bomb Factory |
| April 13 | Las Vegas | United States | House of Blues |
| April 14 | Los Angeles | United States | Wiltern Theatre |
| April 16 | San Francisco | United States | The Warfield |
| April 17 | Seattle | United States | Showbox Sodo |
| July 23 | Shanghai | China | QSW Culture Center |
| July 24 | Shanghai | China | QSW Culture Center |
| September 24 | Guangzhou | China | Guangzho International Trade Center |

- Follow The Movement Tour 2017

| Date | City | Country | Venue |
|---|---|---|---|
| February 11 | Seoul | South Korea | Olympic Hall |
| February 12 | Seoul | South Korea | Olympic Hall |
| March 25 | Bangkok | Thailand | BCC Hall Central Plaza Ladprao |
| April 9 | Taipei | Taiwan | Taipei International Convention Center |
| May 1 | Singapore | Singapore | Suntec Singapore Convention and Exhibition Centre |
| December 16 | Macau | Macau | Studio City Event Center |

- Above Ordinary USA & Canada Tour 2019
- Above Ordinary USA Tour 2022
- Follow The Movement Tour 2023

== Awards and nominations ==
Name of the award ceremony, year presented, award category and the result of the nomination
| Award ceremony | Year | Category | Result | Ref. |
|---|---|---|---|---|
| Elle Style Award | 2017 | Best Music Act | Won | |
| Korean Hip-hop Awards | 2019 | Label of the Year | Nominated | |
| Korean Hip-hop Awards | 2020 | Label of the Year | Nominated | |
| Korean Hip-hop Awards | 2021 | Label of the Year | Nominated | |
| Korean Hip-hop Awards | 2022 | Label of the Year | Nominated | |
