= Hoody (singer) =

South Korean singer-songwriter

- Born: Kim Hyun-jung; February 10, 1990 (age 36); South Korea
- Genre: R&B
- Occupation: Singer-songwriter
- Years active: 2013–present
- Label: AOMG
- Website: aomgofficial.com/hoody

Korean name
- Hangul: 김현정
- RR: Gim Hyeonjeong
- MR: Kim Hyŏnjŏng

Kim Hyun-jung (Korean: 김현정; born February 10, 1990), better known by the stage name Hoody (후디), is a South Korean singer-songwriter. She debuted in 2013 as a member of the all-female underground hip hop crew Amourette. In 2015, she became the first female artist to sign to the hip hop record label AOMG.

== Discography ==
=== Studio albums ===
Title	Album details	Peak chart positions	Sales
Title	Album details	KOR	Sales
Departure	Released: October 29, 2019; Label: AOMG, Genie Music; Formats: CD, digital download; Track listing: 1. "Perfect Timing"; 2. "Stay" (그대로 있어줘) (feat. Ugly Duck); 3. "Love Again"; 4. "Thank You"; 5. "Miro"; 6. "Something Missing (Interlude)"; 7. "What Shall I Do" (또); 8. "Adios" (안녕히) (feat. Gray); 9. "Dance" (춤) (feat. Jclef); 10. "Good and Evil" (선과 악); 11. "Complex"	84	—N/a

=== Extended plays ===
Title	Album details	Peak chart positions	Sales
Title	Album details	KOR	Sales
On and On	Released: December 16, 2016; Label: AOMG, CJ E&M Music; Formats: CD, digital download; Track listing: 1. "By Your Side" (feat. Jinbo); 2. "Your Eyes" (feat. Jay Park); 3. "The Light"; 4. "Lust" (feat. Elo); 5. "Forest"; 6. "Need U" (feat. Dok2); 7. "Like You"; 8. "On And On" (Outro); 9. "Your Eyes" (Inst.)	54	—N/a
Hoody	Released: October 25, 2021; Label: AOMG, Genie Music; Formats: CD, digital download; Track listing: 1. "Lights"; 2. "D-day" (feat. Giriboy); 3. "Dream About U" (꿈속에서) (feat. Ku One Chan); 4. "When The Rain Stops" (비가 그치면)	—	—N/a

=== Singles ===
Title	Year	Peak chart positions	Album
Title	Year	KOR	Album
As lead artist
"My Ride"	2013	—	Non-album singles
"Baby Oh Baby"	2014	—	Non-album singles
"Let Em Know"	2015	—	Non-album singles
"Like You"	2016	—	On and On
"By Your Side" feat. Jinbo	2016	—	On and On
"Your Eyes" feat. Jay Park	2016	—	On and On
"Hangang" (한강)	2017	—	Non-album singles
"Can't Wait" (하나만 해)	2017	—	Non-album singles
"Golden" feat. Jay Park	2018	—	Non-album singles
"Sunshine" feat. Crush	2018	—	Non-album singles
"Adios" (안녕히) feat. Gray	2019	—	Departure
"Automatic Remix" (with Chancellor, Jay Park, Lee Hi, Bibi, Jamie, Moon Su-jin, Bumkey, Samuel Seo, Babylon, Sumin, MRSHLL, Ann One, Elo, twlv, oceanfromtheblue, Jiselle, Sole, Thama, K.vsh, Jinbo, Jerd, Soovi, B.E.D., Xydo, Owell Mood, and None)	2020	—	Non-album single
"When The Rain Stops" (비가 그치면)	2021	—	Hoody
"D-day" feat. Giriboy	2021	—	Hoody
As featured artist
"Solo" Jay Park feat. Hoody	2015	55	Everything You Wanted
"Me Like Yuh" Jay Park feat. Hoody	2016	46	Everything You Wanted
"All I Wanna Do" Jay Park feat. Hoody, Loco	2016	11	Everything You Wanted
"Aphasia" Moon Yirang feat. Hoody	2017	—	Non-album single
"Sax in the City" Jason Lee feat. Hoody	2018	—	Sax in the City
"QMJ" Symba J feat. Jinbo, Hoody	2018	—	I Told You: ???
"Noah" Haon feat. Jay Park, Hoody	2018	19	Travel: Noah
"Lately" pH-1 feat. Hoody	2021	—	Non-album single
"—" denotes release did not chart.
