= Show Me the Money 6 =

- Season 6
- Hosted by: Kim Jin-pyo; DJ DaQ (Resident DJ)
- Judges: Team Dynamic Duo: Choiza; Gaeko; Team 도박 (DoPark): Jay Park; Dok2; Team Fanxychild: Zico; Dean; Team Feel GHood: Tiger JK; Bizzy
- Winner: Hangzoo
- Runners-up: Nucksal (1st Runner-up); Woo Won-jae (2nd Runner-up)

Release
- Original network: Mnet
- Original release: June 30 – September 1, 2017

Season chronology
- ← Previous; Show Me the Money 5 Next → Show Me the Money 777

The sixth season of the series Show Me the Money, known as Show Me the Money 6 (also referred to as SMTM6), premiered on June 30, 2017 and ended on September 1, 2017. It was broadcast every Friday at 23:00 KST on Mnet.

The season features judges Choiza and Gaeko of Dynamic Duo, H1ghr Music's Jay Park of AOMG and Dok2 of Illionaire Records, Tiger JK and Bizzy of Feel GHood Music, and Zico and Dean of Fanxychild. Over 12,000 contestants auditioned this season with a mix of returning contestants, veteran rappers, and upcoming rappers participating in the competition. Similarly to previous seasons, open auditions were held, in Seoul, Los Angeles, and for the first time in New York. Grammy Award-winning producer/rapper Swizz Beatz was guest judge for the New York auditions.

Hangzoo, the third and final member of Rhythm Power to participate in the Show Me the Money series, won the season, with Team Fanxychild's Zico and Dean as the winning producers.

== Judges ==
Team Dynamic Duo (also known as 4Duo):

- Choiza: Co-Founder of Amoeba Culture and one half of the hip-hop group Dynamic Duo.
- Gaeko: Co-Founder of Amoeba Culture and other half of Dynamic Duo.

Team AOM&1llionaire (also known as Team 도박 or Gamble Gang ):

- Jay Park: CEO, rapper and singer for AOMG and H1ghr Music, and Roc Nation recording artist. Previously participated in season four as a judge for Team AOMG.
- Dok2: CEO and rapper for Illionaire Records, and Ambition Muzik and Feel Ghood Crew. Previously participated in seasons three and five as a judge for Team Illionaire.

Team Fanxychild (also known as Team CoDean):

- Zico: Rapper and member of the group Block B, and member of the hip-hop crew Fanxychild. Previously participated as a judge in Show Me The Money 4 for Team ZiPal.
- Dean: Renowned R&B singer/songwriter signed under Joombas Music Group. Also a member of Fanxychild and Club Eskimo crews.

Team Feel GHood (also known as Suicide Squad):

- Tiger JK: Founder and CEO of Feel GHood Music, and member of the hip-hop groups MFBTY and The Movement. A well-respected rapper who is known for introducing Korean Hip-Hop during the late 90s and 2000s.
- Bizzy: Rapper under Feel GHood Music, member of MFBTY and The Movement hip-hop groups.

== Teams ==
During Round Four of the competition, five contestants were chosen to be in each team as follows:

Team Dynamic Duo:

- Nucksal: Rapper under Vismajor Company. Previously competed in season two.
- Jo Woo-chan: The youngest contestant in the show's history at 13 years old (Korean Age), and dubbed "Lil Dok2". He debuted as a member of the South Korean co-ed group AllDay Project under The Black Label in June 2025.
- Hanhae : Member of the Korean hip-hop group Phantom under Brand New Music and Rainbow Bridge World. Previously competed in season four as a member of Team Brand New.
- Ryno: Member of the hip-hop collective crew New Area Aliens.
- myunDo: Competed in all previous seasons before successfully making it into Team Illionaire in season five. Signed to Feel GHood Music's sub-company GHood Life and member of "82 Hottest MC's".

Team DoPark:

- Junoflo: Korean-American rapper who gained popularity in season five for his unique and distinctive flow during the cypher rounds. Also known as a friendly rival of Team Fanxychild member Hash Swan dating back in season five. Currently signed with Feel GHood Music and a member of the LA based hip-hop crews Native Souls and Good Loox.
- Double K: Winning producer in season one and a well-respected rapper/producer across the Korean hip-hop scene. Signed under his own label Green Wave Korea.
- Ness: Unsigned Korean-American rapper also known by the moniker 'Noctunes'.
- Woodie GoChild: Rapper and member of Young Thugs Club (also known as YTC4LYF). Signed with H1ghr Music two months after the show ended
- Ja Mezz: Previously participated in season three in which he was defeated by eventual champion Bobby during the one-on-one round and in season four as a member of Team ZiPal. Signed under Grandline Entertainment.

Team Fanxychild:

- Olltii: Member of freestyle crew Angdreville (ADV) Crew and current host of the YouTube freestyle rap show 7INDAYS. Previously participated in season three as a member of Team YG.
- Killagramz: Korean-American rapper signed under Los Angeles-based label Cycadelic Records. Previously participated in season five as a member of Team YG.
- Young B: Winner of the first season of High School Rapper. Previously participated in seasons four and five under his real name, Yang Hong-won, and his other moniker, Borntong. Currently signed with Just Music's sub-label Indigo Music. Used to be the leader of Dickids, prior to disbandment.
- Hash Swan: Previously participated in season five. Also known as a friendly rival of Team H1ghr Music member Junoflo dating back to season five. Currently signed with Illionaire Records' sub-label Ambition Muzik and a member of Holmes and Piraps Crew.
- Hangzoo: Member of the hip-hop trio Rhythm Power signed under Amoeba Culture. Previously auditioned in season four, but did not make past the first round of auditions. Originally he was only supporting his fellow Rhythm Power members Boi B and Geegooin for the first day of the Seoul preliminary auditions, but after Geegooin's elimination, he decided to register on the next day of the preliminary auditions in the hopes of getting revenge for the elimination of his fellow Rhythm Power member.

Team Feel GHood Music:

- Maniac: Korean-American veteran rapper under his own label, PayDay Entertainment. Previously a member of Jiggy Fellaz, Dynasty Family, New Dynasty and Uptown crews. Also known as "1-Shot" and "OG" with Uptown.
- Black Nine: Former underground rapper known for his hardcore style of rap. Signed with Feel GHood Music a week after he got eliminated this season.
- P-Type: Veteran rapper and producer under Brand New Music. Also known as the former rap teacher of former 2NE1 member CL. Previously participated in season four.
- Asol: The only female rapper to be chosen for a SMTM team this season since Yuk Ji-dam in season three. Also known as ACESOL and a well-known rapper in the Korean hip-hop online community. Member of Sbenu Crew.
- Woo Won-jae: College student at Hongik University who began rapping a year ago. Former member of his university's music club/crew "Brainswords" and was tutored by former SMTM5 and AOMG producer GRAY in college. Part of the Korean street art crew Plutonic Soul. and also known by his moniker "Munch" (뭉크). Signed with AOMG two months after the show ended.

== Rounds ==
- Round One: **Open Auditions** – A random judge listens to a short a cappella rap from each contestant and hand a necklace to contestants that have passed to the next round.
- Round Two: **One Minute Rap** – Contestants have one minute to rap in front of all judges. At least one team of judges must pass the rapper in order for them to move on to the next round. If all four teams fail the rapper, they are eliminated from the competition.

Notable Rappers at the One-Minute Rap Round

| Rapper | Team DoPark | Team Fanxychild | Team Dynamic Duo | Team Feel GHood |
|---|---|---|---|---|
| Hangzoo | PASS | PASS | PASS | PASS |
| Nucksal | PASS | PASS | PASS | PASS |
| Woo Won-jae | PASS | PASS | PASS | PASS |
| Hanhae | PASS | PASS | PASS | PASS |
| Junoflo | PASS | PASS | PASS | PASS |
| Jo Woo-chan | PASS | FAIL | PASS | PASS |
| Young B | PASS | PASS | PASS | FAIL |
| Maniac | PASS | PASS | PASS | PASS |
| Killagramz | PASS | PASS | PASS | FAIL |
| Hash Swan | PASS | PASS | PASS | PASS |
| Olltii | FAIL | PASS | PASS | PASS |
| Black Nine | PASS | PASS | PASS | PASS |
| Asol | PASS | PASS | PASS | PASS |
| Penomeco | PASS | PASS | PASS | PASS |
| Punchnello | FAIL | PASS | PASS | PASS |
| P-Type | FAIL | PASS | FAIL | PASS |
| Sleepy | FAIL | PASS | PASS | PASS |
| Truedy | PASS | FAIL | PASS | PASS |
| Double K | PASS | PASS | PASS | PASS |
| myunDo | PASS | PASS | PASS | PASS |
| Ignito | PASS | PASS | PASS | PASS |
| Ato | PASS | PASS | PASS | PASS |
| Digiri | FAIL | FAIL | FAIL | PASS |

PASSED by the Producer Team
FAILED by the Producer Team

- Round Three: **1-on-1 Rap Battle** – The remaining rappers will evaluate each other and rank them according to their performance during the previous rapper. Unlike previous seasons, rappers will be randomly selected one at a time to choose their opponents. However, they can only pick their opponent from a group of contestants who thinks they can beat that rapper. The two rappers will prepare a performance in front of the judges. The winner to move on to the next round; the other rapper is eliminated.

Notable 1-on-1 battles
| **Junoflo** | vs. | Simba Zawadi |
| **Nucksal** | vs. | Ato |
| Heesun Lee | vs. | **Hangzoo** |
| **Hanhae** | vs. | Los |
| Jin Doggae | vs. | **Hash Swan** |
| Day | vs. | **Olltii** |
| **myunDo** (via sudden death) | vs. | Punchnello |
| **Woodie GoChild** | vs. | Kor Kash (So Hyun-seung) |
| Sandy | vs. | **Jo Woo-chan** |
| **Asol** | vs. | Penomeco |
| **Kasper** | vs. | Grxxd (previously known as Milan in SMTM5) |
| Digiri | vs. | **P-Type** |
| Boi B | vs. | **Black Nine** |
| **Ness** | vs. | Tyyno |
| **Woo Won-jae** (via sudden death) | vs. | Ignito |
| K Jun | vs. | **Killagramz** |
| Zesty | vs. | **Sleepy** |
| Poy | vs. | **JJK** |
| **Maniac** | vs. | Microdot |
| **Young B** | vs. | Choi Hwan-hyuk |
| Guess Black | vs. | **Double K** |

Indicates the winning contestant.

- Round Four: **Cypher/Team Choosing** – The contestants are divided into five groups, with seven rappers in each group. For the cypher round, each producing team randomly selects seven rappers and each performs a freestyle rap. Prior to this round, the Producer Teams perform in front of a live audience and the team with the most audience votes gets to select in the first and final cypher rounds. After each cypher round, the judges rate each rapper based on their performance. The best rapper of each group selects the team he wants to join while the worst rapper in the group is automatically eliminated. The remaining rappers are selected by the judges until five members are on each team. Those who were not chosen were eliminated.

| Rank | Group 1 (Kendrick Lamar - "Humble" + Lupe Fiasco - "Jump") | Group 2 (Drake - "Energy" + Future - "Wicked") | Group 3 (ASAP Ferg - "Work" + Tyga - "Hit 'Em Up") | Group 4 (Dr. Dre - "Still D.R.E." + Jurassic 5 - "What's Golden") | Group 5 (Machine Gun Kelly - "Wild Boy" + Mobb Deep - "Shook Ones (Part II)") |
|---|---|---|---|---|---|
| 1 | **Double K** | **Hangzoo** | **Nucksal** | **Junoflo** | **Killagramz** |
| 2 | Young B | Black Nine | Mojae | Olltii | Ryno |
| 3 | Maniac | Hash Swan | Jay Moon | myunDo | Jo Woo-chan |
| 4 | Hanhae | Ja Mezz | Woodie GoChild | Asol | Woo Won-jae |
| 5 | Mike Choe (Choi Nak-Jun) | JJK | Lako | Bigone (Kim Dae-il) | P-Type |
| 6 | Kasper | Lee Young-jin | Dooyoung (Choi Seo-hyun) | Truedy | Ness |
| 7 | Ice | Sleepy | 1Kyne | Kim Seong-pil | O$ean (Sean Rhee) |

Team H1ghr Music
Team Fanxychild
Team Dynamic Duo
Team Feel GHood
Bold: Indicates the winner of their cypher group and gets to choose the producer team they want to join.
Italicized: Indicates the rapper(s) eliminated after placing last on their cypher group

- Round Five: **Team Song Mission** – Each team performs for all of the judges, and the judges eliminate one contestant from their team at the end of each performance.

| Team | Rappers | Song | Eliminated Rapper |
|---|---|---|---|
| Dynamic Duo | Nucksal, Hanhae, Jo Woo-chan, Ryno, myunDo | "1/N" (N분의 1) | myunDo |
| H1ghr Music | Junoflo, Ja Mezz, Woodie Gochild, Ness, Double K | "Life Is A Gamble" (도박) | Double K |
| Fanxychild | Hangzoo, Olltii, Hash Swan, Killagramz, Young B | "People These Days" (요즘것들) | Olltii |
| Feel GHood | Maniac, Black Nine, Asol, P-Type, Woo Won-jae | "Chopsticks" (젓가락) | P-Type |

- Round Six: **Team Diss Battle** – Producers from opposing teams play rock, paper, scissors to determine the teams that get to choose their opponents for this round. Two one vs. one diss battles and one two vs. two diss battle was held. The losing team eliminates one rapper, based on the producer's decision. All members of the winning team advances to the next round.

Team Dynamic Duo vs. Team Feel GHood
| **Team Dynamic Duo** | vs. | **Team Feel GHood** |
| Nucksal & Jo Woo-chan | vs. | Woo Won-jae and Asol |
| Hanhae | vs. | Maniac |
| Ryno | vs. | Black Nine |

Team H1ghr Music vs. Team Fanxychild
| **Team H1ghr Music** | vs. | **Team Fanxychild** |
| Ness | vs. | Young B |
| Junoflo & Woodie Gochild | vs. | Hash Swan & Killagramz |
| Ja Mezz | vs. | Hangzoo |

Indicates the winning team.
Indicates the eliminated rapper chosen by the losing team after the Team Diss round.

- Round Seven: **Live Performances** – Following the results of the team diss battles, winning teams compete against each other and losing teams compete against each other at the live performances. The winning team producers must choose between two individual team members through mic selection to determine who will perform at the live stage, while the other member is eliminated. The remaining two members perform together live on stage with a special guest performer(s). The losing team producers must choose one individual member to perform with a special guest performer. The remaining two members undergo mic selection where one of them performs with the producers and the other is eliminated. The winners of the respective match-ups advance to the next round. The losing producers of the two-member performance must pick one member to be saved for the next round while the other is eliminated.

| Live Performances | | | Eliminated Rapper(s) |
|---|---|---|---|
| Killagramz - "Where" (어디) (featuring Zico of Block B and Dean) | vs. | **Hanhae** - "Gather At The Lobby" (로비로 모여) (featuring Dynamic Duo and Kim Chung-ha) | Hash Swan; Killagramz; Ryno |
| **Junoflo** - "Eyes on Me" (featuring G.Soul) | vs. | Maniac - "Killin It" (featuring Koonta and Babylon) | Maniac |
| **Woo Won-jae** - "Again" (또) (featuring Tiger JK, Bizzy, MRSHLL) | vs. | Ja Mezz - "Birthday" (featuring Dok2 and Jay Park) | Black Nine; Woodie GoChild; Ja Mezz |
| **Jo Woo-chan and Nucksal** - "What You Call Is The Price" (부르는 게 값이야)" (featuring Don Mills) | vs. | Hangzoo and Young B - "Search" (featuring Car, The Garden) | Young B |

Indicates the winning performance.
Indicates contestant who lost but was saved to move onto the next round.

- Round Eight: **Semifinal Live Performances** - The remaining six contestants will have a solo performance with a special guest performer(s). The rapper(s) who earned the most money in the previous round gets to choose their opponent for the semifinal round. The contestants who had a higher amount of money against their match-up will advance to the final round while the others will be eliminated.

| Semi-final Live Performances | | | Eliminated Rapper |
|---|---|---|---|
| Jo Woo-chan - "VVIP" (featuring Sik-K) | vs. | **Woo Won-jae** - "Pendulum (진자(Zinza))" (featuring Yang Dong-geun and Suran) | Jo Woo-chan |
| **Hangzoo** - "Red Sun" (featuring Swings) | vs. | Hanhae - "One Sun" (featuring Shin Yong-jae of 4Men) | Hanhae |
| Junoflo - "Twisted" (비틀어) (featuring Kim Hyo-eun and Changmo) | vs. | **Nucksal** - "Filament" (필라멘트) (featuring Kim Bum-soo) | Junoflo |

Indicates the rapper advancing to the final round.

- Final Round: **Final Performances (Live Episode)** – The final round is televised live with votes included from both the TV viewers and live audience. In the first part of the finals, all three remaining finalists will perform live on stage with the producers and/or a special guest performer(s). The Top 2 finalists that received the most money from both the TV viewers and live audiences advances to the second part of the finals while the other gets eliminated. In the second part of the finals, the final two contestants will have one last performance alone or with a special guest performer(s). The contestant who earned the most money for their final performance will be this season's champion.

Finals (Part 1) Results
| Team | Rapper | Song | Money Earned* |
|---|---|---|---|
| **Team Dynamic Duo** | **Nucksal** | "**Born Expert**" (천상꾼) (featuring Dynamic Duo and DJ Friz) | 6,925,000 |
| **Team Fanxychild** | **Hangzoo** | "**bestdriverZ**" (featuring Dean and Zion T) | 6,375,000 |
| Team Feel GHood | Woo Wonjae | "Move" (featuring Bizzy) | 6,175,000 |

Indicates the Top 2 contestants advancing to the second part of the finals.

(*)Indicates the combined votes from both the Live Audience and TV viewers.

Finals (Part 2) Results
| Team | Rapper | Song | Money Earned* |
|---|---|---|---|
| Team Dynamic Duo | Nucksal | "Even When the Curtains Fall" (막이 내려도) | 9,400,000 (5,200,000 from TV votes) |
| **Team Fanxychild** | **Hangzoo** | "**Turn It Up**" (돌리고) (featuring DJ Doc) | **9,450,000 (4,800,000 from TV votes)** |

Indicates winner of Show Me The Money 6.

(*)Indicates the combined votes from both the Live Audience and TV viewers. Although Nucksal received more TV votes, Hangzoo was able to get enough audience votes in the final round to win this season.

== Top contestants ==
Top 16

- Team Dynamic Duo: Hanhae, Nucksal, Ryno, Jo Woo-chan
- Team AOMillionaire: Junoflo, Woodie GoChild, Ness, Ja Mezz
- Team Fanxychild: Young B, Hangzoo, Killagramz, Hashswan
- Team Feel GHood: Blacknine, Maniac, Woo Won-jae, Asol

Top 14

- Team Dynamic Duo: Hanhae, Nucksal, Ryno, Jo Woo-chan
- Team AOMiLLionaire: Junoflo, Woodie GoChild, Ja Mezz
- Team Fanxychild: Young B, Hangzoo, Killagramz, Hashswan
- Team Feel GHood: Blacknine, Maniac, Woo Won-jae.

Top 10

- Team Dynamic Duo: Hanhae (selected by mic selection), Nucksal, Jo Woo-chan
- Team AOMiLLionaire: Junoflo, Ja Mezz (selected by mic selection)
- Team Fanxychild: Young B, Hangzoo, Killagramz (selected by mic selection)
- Team Feel GHood: Maniac, Woo Won-jae (selected by mic selection)

Top 6

- Team Dynamic Duo: Hanhae, Nucksal, Jo Woo-chan
- Team AOMiLLionaire: Junoflo
- Team Fanxychild: Hangzoo (saved)
- Team Feel GHood: Woo Won-jae

Top 3:

- Team Dynamic Duo: Nucksal
- Team Fanxychild: Hangzoo
- Team Feel GHood: Woo Won-jae

Finalists:

- Team Dynamic Duo: Nucksal
- Team Fanxychild: Hangzoo

Winner:

- Team Fanxychild: Hangzoo

== Notable contestants ==
- Bryn : Member of the former Dickids crew. She was featured in Episode 1 alongside Ato and Asol as 'Skilled Female Rapper'. However, she was eliminated in the one-minute rap round.
- Penomeco : Korean rapper signed under Million Market and member of Fanxychild crew with judges Zico and Dean. Eliminated during the 1-on-1 rap battle round against Asol.
- Kebee : Member of the Hip-Hop Duo Eluphant under Brand New Music and former CEO of the defunct Soul Company. Shockingly got eliminated during the one-minute rap round.
- Heesun Lee : Korean-American New York-based rapper who joined SMTM6 to find her biological parents in Korea and to introduce more of herself in the Korean Hip-Hop community and try embracing her own Korean heritage more. Eliminated during the 1-on-1 rap battle round against season champion Hangzoo.
- NO:EL : Member of Prima Music Group. Also known by his real name Jang Yong-joon, who dropped out on the first season of High School Rapper due to prostitution and bullying controversies. Eliminated during the one-minute rap round.
- Kasper : Former member of Play the Siren and former contestant for Show Me the Money 4 and Unpretty Rapstar 2. Eliminated during the Cypher/Team Choosing round after none of the producer teams picked her.
- Geegooin and Boi B : Two members of Rhythm Power under Amoeba Culture. Both rappers were contestants for SMTM4 and SMTM5 respectively. Unfortunately, they were eliminated in the preliminary auditions and 1-on-1 round (against Black Nine) respectively for this season. Hangzoo, the group's third and final member who made it to a SMTM team eventually won this season.
- Digiri : A first-generation Korean rapper who caused some controversies during and before the show aired (see Controversies section). Eliminated in the 1-on-1 rap battle round against P-Type.
- Truedy : Unpretty Rapstar 2 champion currently signed under Mnet. Eliminated during the Cypher/Team Choosing round after placing last in her Cypher group.
- Punchnello : Rapper currently signed under YG Entertainment's sublabel HIGHGRND and a member of Club Eskimo crew with producer Dean. Voluntarily eliminated himself after the 1-on-1 battle round against myunDo in order to take care of his sick mother.
- Sleepy : Member of rap duo Untouchable under TS Entertainment. Being known among contestants for his appearances on many variety shows, some have labeled him as a variety man and not a rapper. Eliminated during the Cypher/Team Choosing round after placing last in his Cypher group.
- Jin Doggae : Former 1st runner-up in SMTM1 and a participant in SMTM5. Eliminated during the 1-on-1 rap battle against Hash Swan.
- Microdot : Previously participated in SMTM4 as a member of Team Brand New. He is the younger brother of former SMTM5 contestant and Phantom member Sanchez. Eliminated during the 1-on-1 rap battle round against Maniac.
- JJK : Veteran freestyle rapper and leader of the Angdreville Crew (ADV) with fellow contestant Olltii. Eliminated during the Cypher/Team Choosing round after none of the producer teams picked him. His decision to participate in the show initially stirred up controversy, since he belittled the program in the past, but later stated that the show became important to the Korean Hip-Hop scene.
- Ignito : Veteran rapper who is also known as "The Devil". Member of Vitality Crew. Eliminated during the 1-on-1 rap battle round after his close match-up with eventual 2nd runner-up Woo Won-jae.
- J'Kyun : Former member of Lucky J. Previously participated in SMTM2 and 5. Eliminated during the one-minute rap round.
- 1Kyne : Member of Electroboyz under Brave Entertainment. Eliminated after placing last in the Cypher/Team Choosing round.
- BIGONE : Former member of 24K under his real name Kim Dae-il. He is currently signed to VMC, which also houses eventual 1st runner-up Nucksal. Eliminated during the Cypher/Team Choosing round after none of the producer teams picked him.

== Controversies ==
- During the One-Minute Rap Round, 1st Generation Rapper Digiri, who had personal connections with most of the producers, received a one-pass from Team Feel GHood's Producer Tiger JK despite making mistakes and having a subpar performance. Later in an interview, Tiger JK stated "I couldn't press the fail button, even though it will be an issue. If he doesn't show his real skills in the next round, he'll be eliminated." This led to many viewers showing frustration and anger in the show. To add in this issue, young and skilled rapper Na Sang Wook was failed by both judges after he made a lyrical mistake towards the end of the performance. After the episode was aired, Tiger JK apologized through his Instagram account stating that all decisions he made up until now came from the heart and not from him being objective and that because of that, he asks himself if he was suited to be on the show In addition, rapper Digiri posted a handwritten letter on Instagram apologizing for making mistakes during the show due to his nervousness and for evading military service in the past
- After the end of the Team Song Mission Rounds, many netizens believed that Team Fanxychild member Olltii was the subject of the show's "Devil Editing" as the show showed his teammates' negative reactions from other, unrelated scenes into Olltii's interview and added background music to make it appear like he was offending his team members. This was believed as a result of the rapper's lack of screen time on the show, making the use of Devil Editing increase his screen time on the show. Producers Zico, Dean and members of Team Fanxychild defended Olltii's stating that the scenes were overly emphasized throughout the broadcast, that he is a very sociable and nice guy, and jokes are jokes, let's not misunderstand them.
