= Woodz discography =

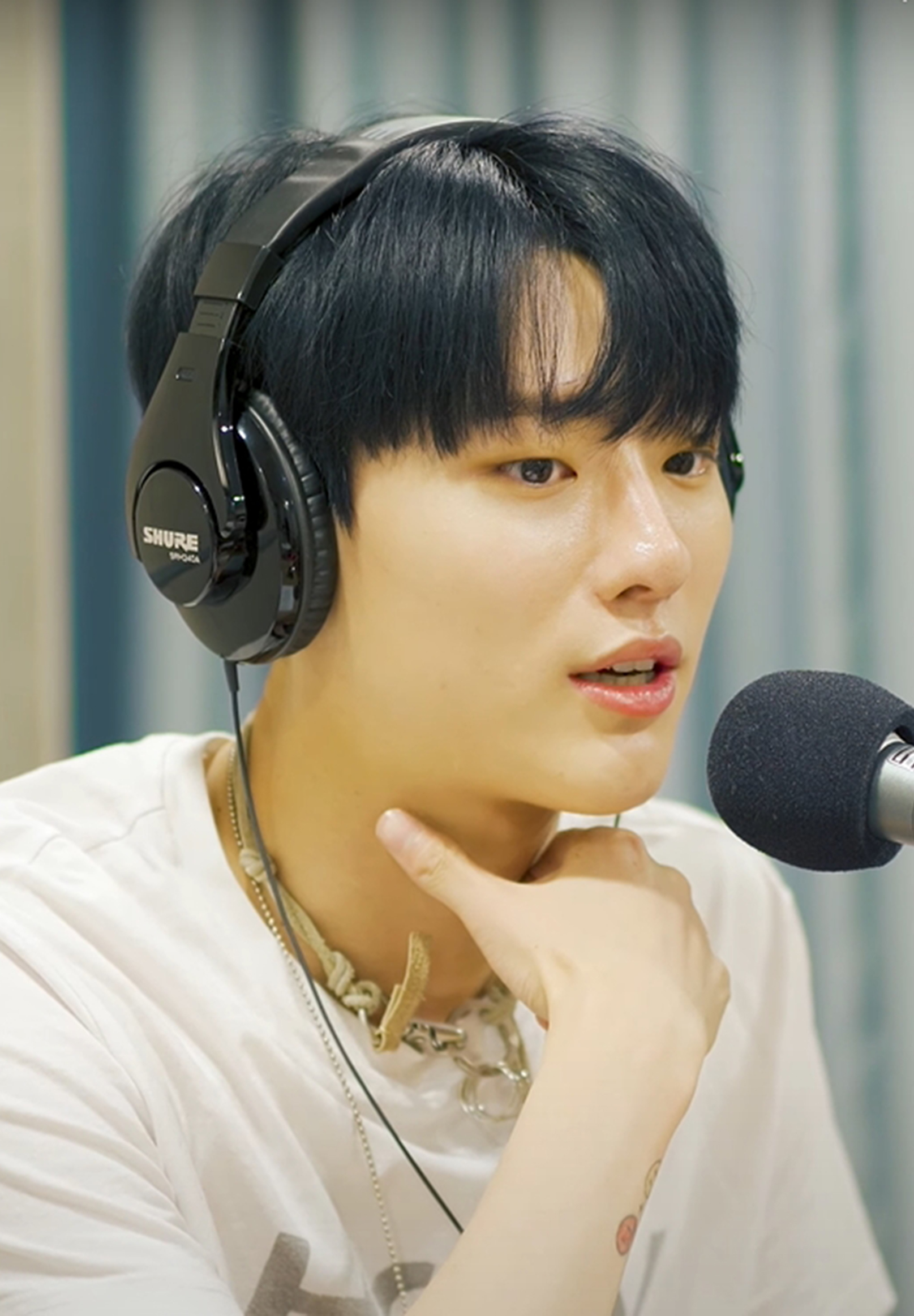
- Woodz in 2020
- Studio albums: 1
- EPs: 5
- Singles: 31
- Single albums: 2

South Korean singer-songwriter Woodz has released one studio album, five extended plays (EPs), two single albums, and 31 singles (including ten as featured artist).

== Studio albums ==
List of studio album, showing selected details, selected chart positions, and sales figures
Title	Details	Peak chart positions	Sales
Title	Details	KOR	Sales
Archive. 1	Scheduled: March 4, 2026; Label: Edam Entertainment; Formats: CD, digital download, streaming; Track listing: 1. "00:30"; 2. "Super Lazy"; 3. "Day Fly" (하루살이); 4. "The Spark" (화근); 5. "Human Extinction"; 6. "Stray" (비행); 7. "Bloodline"; 8. "Downtown"; 9. "Stop That"; 10. "Na Na Na"; 11. "Struggle" (몸부림); 12. "Beep"; 13. "Plastic"; 14. "Glass"; 15. "Cinema"; 16. "Samo" (사모); 17. "To My January"	3	KOR: 60,377

== Extended plays ==
List of extended plays, showing selected details, selected chart positions, and sales figures
Title	Details	Peak chart positions	Sales
Title	Details	KOR	Sales
Equal	Released: June 29, 2020; Label: Yuehua Entertainment; Formats: CD, digital download, streaming; Track listing: 1. "Lift Up"; 2. "Accident"; 3. "Love Me Harder" (파랗게); 4. "Noid"; 5. "Waikiki" (feat. Colde); 6. "Buck" (feat. Punchnello); 7. "Memories" (주마등)	4	KOR: 149,560
Woops!	Released: November 17, 2020; Label: Yuehua Entertainment; Formats: CD, digital download, streaming; Track listing: 1. "Trigger" (방아쇠); 2. "Bump Bump"; 3. "On My Own" (내 맘대로); 4. "Thanks To"; 5. "Sweater" (feat. Jamie); 6. "Tide"	2	KOR: 100,831
Only Lovers Left	Released: October 5, 2021; Label: Yuehua Entertainment; Formats: CD, digital download, streaming; Track listing: 1. "Multiply"; 2. "Thinkin Bout You"; 3. "Sour Candy"; 4. "Kiss of Fire"; 5. "Chaser"; 6. "Waiting"	4	KOR: 52,500
Colorful Trauma	Released: May 4, 2022; Label: Yuehua Entertainment; Formats: CD, digital download, streaming; Track listing: 1. "Dirt on My Leather"; 2. "Hijack"; 3. "I Hate You" (난 너 없이); 4. "Better and Better"; 5. "Hope to Be Like You" (안녕이란 말도 함께)	4	KOR: 95,682
Oo-Li	Released: April 26, 2023; Label: Edam Entertainment; Formats: CD, digital download, streaming; Track listing: 1. "Deep Deep Deep"; 2. "Journey"; 3. "Drowning"; 4. "Busted"; 5. "Who Knows"; 6. "Ready to Fight"; 7. "Abyss" (심연)	9	KOR: 82,078

== Single albums ==
List of single albums, showing selected details, selected chart positions, and sales figures
Title	Details	Peak chart positions	Sales
Title	Details	KOR	Sales
Set	Released: March 15, 2021; Label: Yuehua Entertainment; Format: CD, digital download, streaming; Track listing: 1. "Feel Like"; 2. "Touché" (featuring Moon); 3. "Rebound"	4	KOR: 89,577
Amnesia	Released: December 18, 2023; Label: Edam Entertainment; Format: Digital download, streaming; Track listing: 1. "Amnesia"; 2. "Behind"	—	
"—" denotes a recording that did not chart or was not released in that territory

== Singles ==
=== As lead artist ===
List of singles as lead artist, showing year released, selected chart positions, and name of the album
Title	Year	Peak chart positions	Album
Title	Year	KOR	Album
"Baby Ride" (feat. Im Hyun-sik)	2016	—	Baby Ride
"How Have You Been" (요즘 뭐 해)	2016	—	Baby Ride
"Pool"	2018	—	Non-album singles
"Different"	2018	—	Non-album singles
"Meaningless" (아무의미)	2018	—	Non-album singles
"Love Me Harder" (파랗게)	2020	— (Note: "Love Me Harder" did not enter the Gaon Digital Chart, but appeared at number 10 on the component Download chart.)	Equal
"Bump Bump"	2020	127	Woops!
"Feel Like"	2021	22	Set
"Lullaby"	2021	—	Non-album single
"Kiss of Fire"	2021	— (Note: "Kiss of Fire" did not enter the Gaon Digital Chart, but appeared at number 69 on the component Download chart.)	Only Lovers Left
"Waiting"	2021	35	Only Lovers Left
"I Hate You" (난 너 없이)	2022	102	Colorful Trauma
"I'll Never Love Again"	2025	84	Non-album singles
"Falling" (featuring Young K of Day6)	2025	166	Non-album singles
"Cinema"	2026	113	Archive. 1
"—" denotes a recording that did not chart or was not released in that territory

=== As featured artist ===
List of singles as featuring artist, showing year released, and name of the album
Title	Year	Album
"Dream" (꿈) (Lee Gi-kwang feat. Luizy)	2017	One
"Dance" (춤) (Eden feat. Woodz)	2018	Ryu: 川
"Wave" (파도) (Killagramz feat. Woodz)	2018	Hue.休
"Pick Up the Phone" (전화받아) (Park Ji-min feat. Kino, Woodz, NATHAN)	2018	jiminxjamie
"Bad" (Kriz feat. Woodz)	2018	Non-album singles
"Bless You" (Primary feat. Sam Kim, Woodz, ph-1)	2020	Non-album singles
"MIA" (Gemini feat. CAMO, Woodz)	2021	Inside Out
"Fine" (Boycold feat. SOMA, Woodz)	2022	Daft Love
"MIA – Remix" (Gemini feat. CAMO, Woodz)	2023	Love Sick
"Toxic Love" (Colde feat. Woodz, DeVita, JEY)	2024	Yin Remix
"Pajama" (Prod. Zico, Crush) (Raf Sandou feat. Woodz)	2026	Show Me the Money 12 Semi Final

=== Collaborations ===
List of collaborations, showing year released, and name of the album
Title	Year	Album
"Recipe" (with Flowsik)	2016	Non-album single
"Drive" (with Eden and Babylon)	2018	Eden_Stardust.04

=== Soundtrack appearances ===
List of soundtrack appearances, showing year released, and name of the album
Title	Year	Peak chart positions	Album
Title	Year	KOR	Album
"Eating Alone" (혼밥) (with Im Hyun-sik)	2017	—	Sing For You O.S.T
"Sun or Suck" (해가 될까)	2021	—	Exchange 1 O.S.T
"There for You"	2021	—	Monthly Magazine Home O.S.T
"About You"	2022	—	Yumi's Cells 2 O.S.T
"March"	2025	—	The Dream Life of Mr. Kim O.S.T
"Everglow"	2026	129	Perfect Crown O.S.T

== Other charted songs ==
Title	Year	Peak chart positions	Certifications	Album
Title	Year	KOR	Certifications	Album
"Drowning"	2023	1	KMCA: Platinum	Oo-Li
