= Show Me the Money 5 =

- Season 5
- Hosted by: Kim Jin-pyo; DJ DaQ (Resident DJ)
- Judges: Team AOMG: Simon Dominic; Gray; Team YG: Kush; Zion.T; Team Illionaire: Dok2; The Quiett; Team Mad Clown & Gill: Mad Clown; Gill
- Winner: Bewhy
- Runners-up: C Jamm (1st Runner-up); SuperBee (2nd Runner-up)

Release
- Original network: Mnet
- Original release: May 6 – July 15, 2016

Season chronology
- ← Previous; Show Me the Money 4 Next → Show Me the Money 6

The fifth season of the series Show Me the Money, known as Show Me the Money 5 (also referred to as SMTM5), premiered on May 6, 2016 and ended July 15, 2016. It is on broadcast every Friday at 23:00 KST on Mnet.

Mnet's fifth season of SMTM features YG Entertainment judges Kush and Zion.T, Dok2 and The Quiett from Illionaire Records, AOMG co-CEO Simon Dominic and producer Gray, and judges Mad Clown and Gill of Leessang. A record-breaking number of 9,000 contestants auditioned this season.

The process of SMTM5 was similar to that of Show Me the Money 4 with open auditions where contestants were asked for an a cappella rap, but for the first time LA auditions were also held in addition to the traditional audition in Seoul. American rapper Timbaland was a guest judge during Round 2 of the LA auditions.

== Judges ==
Team YG:

- Kush: Co-head of The Black Label, an independent sub-label of YG Entertainment. Producer of hit songs and former member of Stony Skunk
- Zion.T: Singer and producer under The Black Label and member of VV:D crew alongside Gray. Previously an artist under Amoeba Culture

Team AOMG:

- Simon Dominic: Former co-CEO of AOMG, rapper and former member of duo Supreme Team
- Gray: Producer, rapper, and singer under AOMG, and member of the VV:D crew alongside Zion.T.

Team Illionaire:

- Dok2: Co-CEO of Illionaire Records and rapper. He also participated in SMTM3 as a judge.
- The Quiett: Co-CEO of Illionaire Records and rapper. He also participated in SMTM3 as a judge.

Team Mad Clown & Gill:

- Mad Clown: Rapper under Starship Entertainment . He was also a contestant from Show Me The Money 2.
- Gill: Rapper, producer in hip-hop duo Leessang, former member of underground rap group Honey Family.

== Teams ==
Team YG

- C Jamm : Former SMTM3 semi-finalist. Signed under Just Music label. Member of $exy Street with BewhY
- Reddy : Hi-Lite Records rapper. Previously auditioned for Superstar K as a rapper for All-Male K-Pop group BTS but did not make it pass the auditions.
- Killagramz : Rapper from LA signed under Cycadelic Records
- Xitsuh : Freestyle rapper that was Formerly a part of the Angdreville crew. Gained popularity after he was eliminated during the freestyle round in SMTM4. Known previously on SMTM as Seo Chul Gu.

Team AOMG

- G2 : Signed under Hi-Lite Records.
- BewhY : Gained popularity after his elimination on SMTM4, Known as a member of the duo Sexy Street with C Jamm.
- ONE : Rapper formerly signed under YG Entertainment On July 17, 2019 he left YG Entertainment and opened his own entertainment company called Private Only and formerly part of the duo 1PUNCH. He was on Team ZiPal during SMTM4.
- DayDay : Producer/songwriter of boy band DMTN (Dalmatian). He was a member of Team AOMG during SMTM4 and went by his birthname, David Kim.

Team Mad Clown & Gill

- Sanchez : Known primarily as the singer and producer of Phantom under Brand New Music, he is the older brother of SMTM4 contestant Microdot and started as a rapper under the name "Fassnakuh."
- Donutman : Independent rapper, previously signed with the defunct Soul Company and member of Clarity Crew
- #Gun : Competed in Starship Entertainment's No Mercy competition show for a chance to become part of idol group Monsta X, but was not chosen. He is also cousins with SMTM4 runner-up Song Min-ho. Signed under Starship Entertainment.
- Boi B : Rapper in Rhythm Power under Amoeba Culture.

Team Illionaire

- myunDo : Participant of SMTM in the past, but was eliminated during the one-on-one rap battle round. Part of "82 Hottest MC's" with Superbee.
- Flowsik : Former member of Aziatix, entered the competition through the LA auditions. Timbaland's favorite of the LA auditions. Previously signed with Lil Wayne's Cash Money Records from 2013 to 2014.
- Kim Hyo-eun : Previously participated in SMTM3 in which he caused stir with rapper Tarae for winning their 1 on 1 battle round. Also known by his moniker "Kenny Raw". Currently signed with Illionaire Records' Sub-Unit Company "Ambition Musik"
- Superbee : A member of Team YG during SMTM4, he returned to SMTM5 through the LA auditions. Has participated in all seasons of SMTM. Part of "82 Hottest MC's" with myunDo.

== Rounds ==
Round One: Contestants must rap a cappella in front of a judge. The contestants are given a necklace if they pass.
Round Two: Contestants prepare a one-minute rap using the beat of their choice and rap in front of all the judges. In order to pass on to the next round, they must receive at least one pass.

Notable Rappers at the One-Minute Rap Round

Rapper	Team Illionaire	Team AOMG	Team Mad Clown & Gill	Team YG	Timbaland (LA Auditions)
Bewhy	PASS	PASS	PASS	PASS	—
C Jamm	PASS	PASS	PASS	PASS	—
SuperBee	PASS	PASS	PASS	PASS	**PASS**
Reddy	PASS	PASS	PASS	PASS	—
Xitsuh	FAIL	PASS	FAIL	PASS	—
#Gun	PASS	PASS	PASS	PASS	—
myunDO	PASS	PASS	PASS	PASS	—
Flowsik	PASS	PASS	PASS	PASS	**PASS**
Killagramz	PASS	PASS	PASS	PASS	**PASS**
Junoflo	PASS	PASS	PASS	FAIL	**PASS**
Boi B	PASS	PASS	PASS	PASS	—
ONE	FAIL	PASS	PASS	PASS	—
Donutman*	PASS	PASS	PASS	PASS	—
Sanchez	PASS	PASS	PASS	PASS	—
₩uNo	PASS	PASS	PASS	PASS	—
Jung Sang-soo	PASS	PASS	FAIL	PASS	—
G2	PASS	PASS	PASS	PASS	—
Snacky Chan	PASS	PASS	FAIL	PASS	—
Giant Pink	FAIL	FAIL	PASS	FAIL	—
Khundi Panda	FAIL	FAIL	FAIL	FAIL	—
ONESUN	FAIL	FAIL	FAIL	FAIL	—
Cho Seung-youn	FAIL	FAIL	PASS	FAIL	—
Hash swan	PASS	PASS	PASS	PASS	—

PASSED by the Producer Team
FAILED by the Producer Team
(*) Received an ALL-PASS from the Producer Teams but was placed on the Fair Cypher Group during the Cypher sessions.

Round Three: Contestants pair up for a 1v1 rap battle. Prior to this round, all the rappers participate in a cypher in order to assess each other's skills. Only one person can win the battle and move onto the next round. Unlike previous seasons, there was no revival round in SMTM5.

Rapper	"Terrible" Grade Cypher (Nas - "Made You Look")	"Poor" Grade Cypher (Tupac - "Ambitionz Az a Ridah")	"Fair" Grade Cypher (Dr. Dre - "The Watcher")	"Good" Grade Cypher (Notorious B.I.G. - "Hypnotize")
1	Cho Seung-youn (of UNIQ)	Xitsuh (Seo Chul-goo)	Snacky Chan	C Jamm
2	J'Kyun	Kim Seunghwan	Donutman*	G2
3	LeellaMarz	Moranae (Hwang Keung-il)	Jung Sang-soo	Dilla
4	Tilda	JDUB	Junoflo	#GUN
5	Giant Pink	Evo	Kim Hyo-eun	₩uNo
6	K9	Mojae	Kidd King (Baek Minhyuk)	BewhY
7	Lee Kyu-hwan		ONE	myunDO
8	CARAT (Shim Hye-ji)		Bray	SuperBee
9	Lee Taek-min		Yang Hong-won (Borntong/YoungB)	BoiB
10	Kim Taejung			Sanchez
11				Reddy
12				Jo Hee-chul
13				Killagramz
14				Hash swan
15				DayDay (David Kim)
16				Flowsik

(*) Received an ALL-PASS from the Producer Teams but was placed on the Fair Cypher Group during the Cypher sessions.

Notable 1-on-1 battles
**BewhY**	vs.	JDUB
**C Jamm**	vs.	Kidd King
LeellaMarz	vs.	**SuperBee**
**Flowsik**	vs.	Cho Seung-youn
Junoflo	vs.	**Hash Swan**
Bray	vs.	**Donutman**
**G2**	vs.	Snacky Chan
**ONE**	vs.	Lee Kyu-hwan
J'Kyun	vs.	**Xitsuh**
**Sanchez**	vs.	Evo
**myunDO** (via sudden death)	vs.	₩uNo
CARAT	vs.	**Miss LA***
Dilla	vs.	**Giant Pink**
**Kim Hyo-eun**	vs.	Kim Tae-jung
Lee Taek-min	vs.	**Tilda**
Moranae	vs.	**Boi B**
K9	vs.	**Jo Hee-chul**
**Reddy**	vs.	Mojae
Jung Sang-soo	vs.	**Killagramz**

Winner advances to the Team Selection Round.

(*) Miss LA (from the LA auditions) was chosen by the show's producers as a replacement for fellow LA contestant Legendary Temo after not making it to the later rounds due to Visa Issues. Unlike the other LA rappers that made it through auditions, she did not participate in the Cypher Round of the show.

Round Four: Contestants and judges must choose each other for the contestant to become part of the Top 16. If the contestant fails to get a match with one of the judging teams, they are eliminated. This round deviates from the typical SMTM team selection process.
Round Five: The new teams participate in a team song mission to assess their rapping and teamwork skills. The worst rapper in the team is eliminated by their team's producers.

Team	Rappers	Song	Eliminated Rapper
Illionaire	Kim Hyo-eun, SuperBee, myunDO, Flowsik	"Air DoTheQ"	Kim Hyo-eun
YG	C Jamm, Reddy, Killagramz, Xitsuh	"$insa"	Killagramz
Mad Clown & Gill	Sanchez, Donutman, Boi B, #GUN	"Rose of Sharon"	Sanchez
AOMG	ONE, Bewhy, G2, DayDay	"I'm Not The Person You Used To Know"	DayDay

Round Six: Team diss battles.

Diss Battles
**Team YG**	vs.	**Team AOMG**
Xitsuh	vs.	ONE
Reddy	vs.	G2
C Jamm	vs.	Bewhy

Diss Battles
**Team Gill & Mad Clown**	vs.	**Team Illionaire**
Donutman	vs.	Flowsik
Boi B	vs.	myunDO
#GUN	vs.	SuperBee

The team won during the diss round and gains the advantage of having three contestants participate in the live performances instead of just two.

Round Seven: Following the results of the team diss battles, losing teams face against each other and winning teams face against each other at the live performances. Losing team producers choose one rapper to perform during the live show. The two remaining rappers write verses for a collaboration song written by their producers. Prior to the live show, the two rappers go through a mic-selection, where the producers choose one rapper to perform with them. The other rapper is eliminated from the show. Meanwhile, the winning teams choose one rapper to perform on their own and the remaining two rappers perform a song together.

Match-Ups			Eliminated Rapper(s)
ONE - "Comfortable" (featuring Simon Dominic & Gray)	vs.	**#GUN** - "Going Home" (featuring Mad Clown & Gummy)	ONE; G2; Donutman
**BewhY** - "Forever"	vs.	Boi B - "Swallowtail" (featuring Gill & Rhythm Power)	Boi B
**C Jamm & Reddy** - "Most Wanted"	vs.	**Superbee** & myunDo - "Beverly 1lls"	myunDo
**Xitsuh**- "Like a Drummer" (featuring Zion.T & Olltii)	vs.	Flowsik - "I Just + Rapstar (Remix)" (featuring Dok2 & The Quiett)	Flowsik

The contestant won against his opponent during the live performance and moved onto the next round.
The contestant lost against his opponents but was saved to move onto the next round.

Round Eight: Semi-finals. - The remaining six contestants will have solo performances with a special guest performer(s) with each of them matched-up against another contestant. The contestant who earned more amount of money during their match-up will advance to the final round, while the other gets eliminated.

Match-Ups			Eliminated Rapper(s)
#GUN - "I miss you, I love you" (featuring Jessi)	vs.	**C Jamm** - "Beautiful" (featuring Zico)	#GUN
**Superbee** - "Sun Block" (featuring Microdot)	vs.	Xitsuh - "AND" (featuring Suran)	Xitsuh
**BewhY** - "Day Day" (featuring Jay Park)	vs.	Reddy- "Like This" (featuring Bobby)	Reddy

The contestant won against his opponent during the live performance and moved onto the next round.

Semifinals Voting Results
Team	Rapper	Money Earned
**Team AOMG**	**Bewhy**	**7,550,000**
**Team YG**	**C Jamm**	**5,475,000**
**Team Illionaire**	**SuperBee**	**5,450,000**
Team Gill & Mad Clown	#GUN	4,025,000
Team YG	Xitsuh	3,975,000
Team YG	Reddy	1,825,000

Bold : Indicates Top 3 contestants advancing to the final round.

Round Nine: Finals – The final round is televised live with 50% of the votes from the TV audience and the remaining 50% from the live audience. In the first part of the finals, all three remaining finalists will perform live on stage with their producers. The finalist who receives the least money through audience votes in the first part of the finals will be eliminated. In the second part of the finals, the final two contestants will have one last performance alone or with a special guest featuring. The contestant who earned the most money will be this season's champion.

Finals (Part 1) Results
Team	Rapper	Song	Money Earned
**Team AOMG**	**Bewhy**	"XamBaqJa" (쌈박자) (featuring Simon Dominic)	10,975,000
**Team YG**	**C Jamm**	"MM" (featuring Kush)	4,850,000
Team Illionaire	SuperBee	"Air DoTheQ part 2" (공중도덕 part 2) (featuring The Quiett and Dok2)	3,375,000

Indicates Top 2 contestants advancing to the next round.

Finals (Part 2) Results
Team	Rapper	Song	Money Earned
**Team AOMG**	**Bewhy**	"Fake" (자화상 pt.2)	10,750,000
Team YG	C Jamm	"Let It Be" (재방송) (featuring Crush)	7,525,000

Indicates winner of Show Me The Money 5.

== Notable contestants ==
Contestant	Team	1	2	3	4	5	6	7	8	9
BewhY	AOMG	PASS	ALL-PASS	PASS	PASS	PASS	WON	PASS	PASS	Winner
C Jamm	YG	PASS	ALL-PASS	PASS	PASS	PASS	LOST	PASS	PASS	Runner-Up
Superbee	Illionaire	PASS	ALL-PASS	PASS	PASS	PASS	WON	SAVED	PASS	3rd place
Reddy	YG	PASS	ALL-PASS	PASS	PASS	PASS	WON	PASS	ELIM	
Xitsuh	YG	PASS	FAIR	PASS	PASS	PASS	WON	PASS	ELIM	
#GUN	Mad Clown & Gill	PASS	ALL-PASS	PASS	PASS	PASS	LOST	PASS	ELIM	
Flowsik	Illionaire	PASS	ALL-PASS	PASS	PASS	PASS	WON	ELIM		
myunDo	Illionaire	PASS	ALL-PASS	PASS	PASS	PASS	WON	ELIM		
Boi B	Mad Clown & Gill	PASS	ALL-PASS	PASS	PASS	PASS	LOST	ELIM		
ONE	AOMG	PASS	GOOD	PASS	PASS	PASS	LOST	ELIM		
G2	AOMG	PASS	ALL-PASS	PASS	PASS	PASS	LOST	ELIM		
Donutman	Mad Clown & Gill	PASS	GOOD	PASS	PASS	PASS	LOST	ELIM		
Sanchez	Mad Clown & Gill	PASS	ALL-PASS	PASS	PASS	ELIM				
Killagramz	YG	PASS	ALL-PASS	PASS	PASS	ELIM				
David Kim	AOMG	PASS	ALL-PASS	PASS	PASS	ELIM				
Kim Hyo-eun	Illionaire	PASS	GOOD	PASS	PASS	ELIM				
Hash Swan	-	PASS	ALL-PASS	PASS	ELIM					
₩uNo	-	PASS	ALL-PASS	ELIM						
Junoflo	-	PASS	GOOD	ELIM						
J'Kyun	-	PASS	LOW	ELIM						

WINNER The contestant won Show Me the Money 5.
Runner-Up The contestant was the runner-up.
3rd place The contestant was the 3rd place.
ALL-PASS The contestant received an All-Pass during the second round.
GOOD The contestant received one fail during the second round.
FAIR The contestant received two fails during the second round.
LOW The contestant only received one pass during the second round.
ELIM The contestant was eliminated.
WON The contestant's team won during the diss battle round.
PASS The contestant won against his opponent during the live performance and moved onto the next round.
SAVED The contestant lost against his opponent but was saved to move onto the next round.
ELIM The contestant was not chosen to perform in the live performance.
The contestant did not participate in this round.
