= Flowsik =

South Korean-American rapper

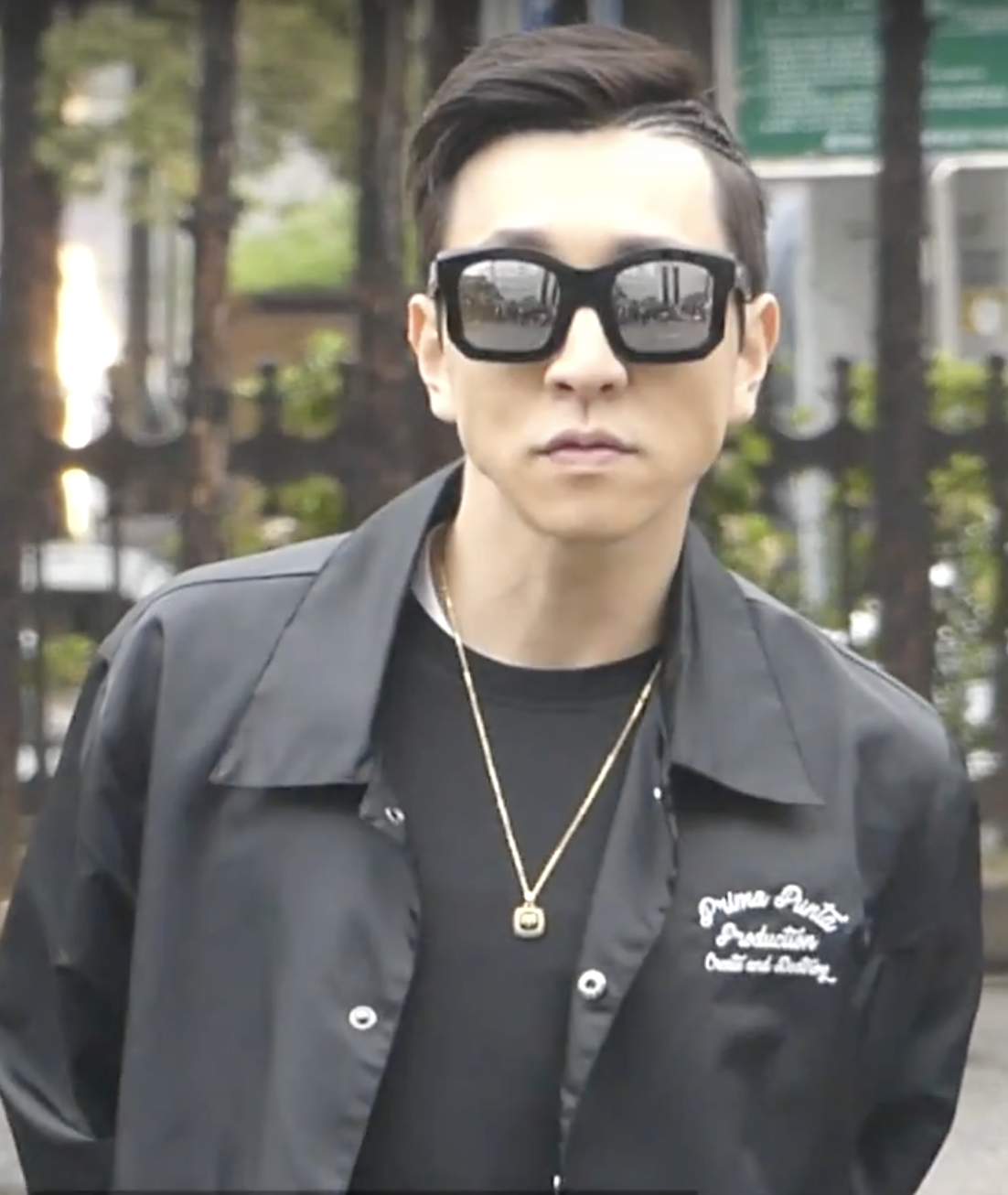
- Flowsik in April 2018

Background information
- Also known as: Jay Pak
- Born: April 5, 1985 (age 41); Queens, New York, United States
- Genre: Hip hop
- Occupations: Rapper; singer
- Instruments: Vocals; trumpet; baritone horn
- Years active: 2011–present
- Label: South Paw Records

Korean name
- Hangul: 박대식
- RR: Bak Daesik
- MR: Pak Taesik

Jay Pak (Korean name: Pak Dae-sik, Korean: 박대식; born April 5, 1985), more commonly known by his stage name, Flowsik (/ˈfloʊsɪk/ FLOH-sik; 플로우식), is a South Korean–American rapper and singer. He debuted in 2011 as a member of the hip-hop trio Aziatix. He released his first solo single, "The Calling," in 2015 and was a contestant on the South Korean rap competition TV show Show Me the Money 5 in 2016.

== Early life and education ==
Flowsik was born in the borough of Queens, New York City, on April 5, 1985. He was interested in music from a young age, and played both the trumpet and baritone horn while growing up. He graduated from Benjamin N. Cardozo High School and went on to graduate from Queens College with a degree in English literature in 2008.

== Career ==
=== 2015–present: Solo work ===
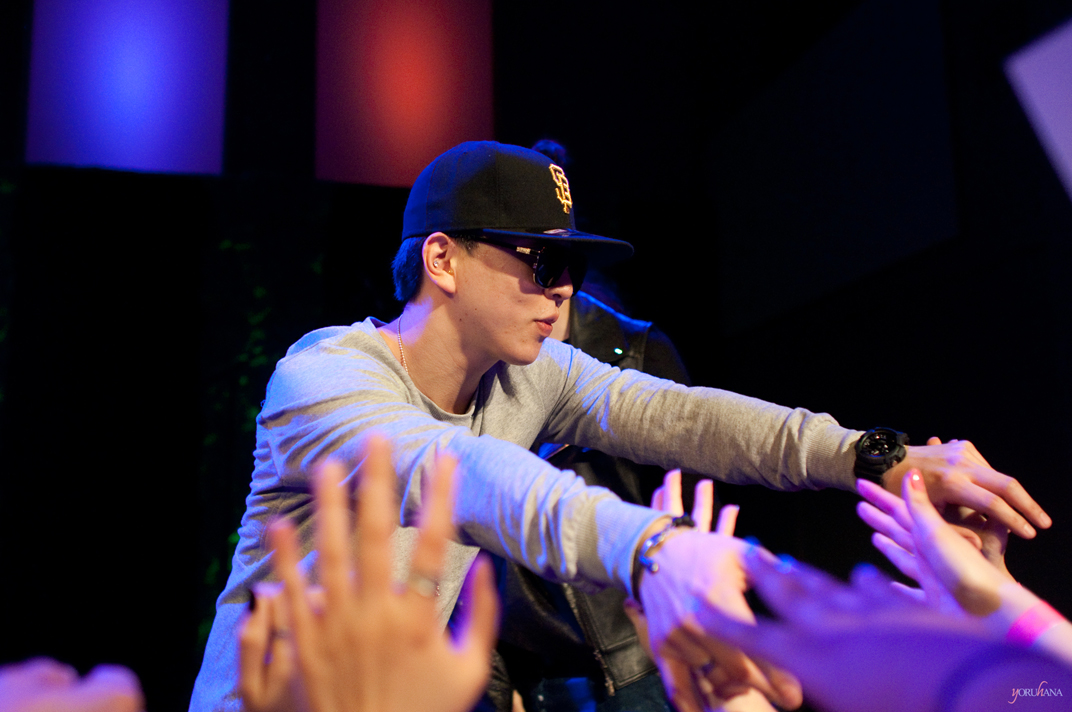
Flowsik performing with Aziatix in 2012

In 2016, he competed on Show Me the Money 5, but was eliminated in the seventh round.

In November 2017, he collaborated with Teri Miko and Varien for "Wrath of God" on a Spinnin' Records' single. In 2018, Flowsik released "All I Need" and "젖어's (Wet)", which are part of a collaboration series with Jessi.

== Discography ==
=== Singles ===
Title	Year	Peak chart positions			Sales	Album
Title	Year	KOR Gaon	KOR Hot 100	US World	Sales	Album
As lead artist
"The Calling"	2015	—	—	—	—N/a	Non-album singles
"Yah Nuh" (야, 너)	2015	—	—	—	—N/a	Non-album singles
"Higher Plane" feat. Kang Min-kyung	2017	—	—	—	—N/a	Criminal Minds OST
"Bbung" (뻥)	2018	—	—	—	—N/a	Non-album singles
"KARI"	2018	—	—	—	—N/a	Non-album singles
"1 Week" (일주일째) feat. Gary	2019	—	—	—	—N/a	Non-album singles
Collaborations
"Get Low" with Jooheon	2015	—	—	—	—N/a	SUPEXX
"Air DoTheQ" (공중도덕) with Superbee & MyunDo feat. Dok2 & The Quiett	2016	5	—	—	KOR: 455,171+	Show Me the Money 5
"Rapstar (Remix)" with Dok2 & The Quiett	2016	46	—	—	KOR: 171,917+	Show Me the Money 5
"Goblin" (도깨비) with Hash Swan, Boi B, ₩uNo & G2	2016	25	—	—	KOR: 120,785+	Show Me the Money 5
"Recipe" with Luizy	2016	—	—	—	—N/a	Non-album singles
"Go Hard" with Overwatch	2017	—	—	—	—N/a	Non-album singles
"Sway" with Double K, Killagramz, Vandal Rock	2018	—	—	—	—N/a	Non-album singles
"All I Need" with Jessi	2018	—	—	—	—N/a	Non-album singles
"Wet" (젖어'S) with Jessi	2018	—	—	—	—N/a	Non-album singles
As a featured artist
"Tarantallegra" Xia feat. Flowsik	2012	22	39	—	KOR: 195,730+	Tarantallegra
"Ni Na No" (니나노) Minzy feat. Flowsik	2017	44	—	18	KOR: 38,531+	Minzy Work 01: Uno
"—" denotes releases that did not chart.

=== Other charted songs ===
Title	Year	Peak chart positions		Album
Title	Year	KOR Gaon	KOR Hot 100	Album
"I Love You" JYJ feat. Flowsik	2010	69	—N/a	The Beginning
"I Like" Hyuna feat. Flowsik	2013	39	73	Chemistry
"Only Love" Kim Jae-joong feat. Flowsik	2013	82	—	Y
"—" denotes releases that did not chart.

== Filmography ==
=== Television ===
Year	Program	Notes	Ref.
2016	Show Me the Money 5	Contestant	

== Awards ==
Year	Award	Category	Nominated work	Result	Ref.
2017	Korean Hip-hop Awards	Collaboration of the Year	"Eung Freestyle" with DPR Live, Sik-K, Punchnello, Owen Ovadoz	Won	
