= Show Me the Money (South Korean TV series) =

2012 South Korean TV series

- Hangul: 쇼미더머니
- RR: Syo mi deo meoni
- MR: Syo mi tŏ mŏni
- Presented by: Eun Ji-won; Kim Jin-pyo
- Country of origin: South Korea
- Original language: Korean
- No. of seasons: 12

Production
- Producer: Han Dong-chul
- Production locations: Seoul, South Korea
- Production company: CJ E&M

Original release
- Network: Mnet
- Release: 2012

Related
- Unpretty Rapstar; High School Rapper; Show Me the Money Thailand

Show Me the Money (SMTM; Korean: 쇼미더머니) is a South Korean rap competition TV show that airs on Mnet. The show has grown in popularity since the first season aired in 2012 to the twelfth season in 2026, and it is credited for increasing the South Korean public's interest in hip hop.

== Background ==
When SMTM first aired in 2012, it was the only show on South Korean television to focus on hip hop, and the first show on Mnet about hip hop since the music channel cancelled Hip Hop the Vibe in 2004. Han Dong-chul, the chief producer of SMTM, later said of the show, "My goal was to let people know that there is more than just idol dance music in Korea."

The format of each season varies, but generally consists of contestants going head to head in a series of challenges until only one rapper remains. The show includes a mixture of rookie and experienced rappers, with the experienced rappers typically serving as "producers," a role that includes being both mentors and judges.

== Season 1 (2012) ==
The first season of SMTM began airing on June 22, 2012, and was hosted by Eun Ji-won of the K-pop group Sechs Kies. The season paired experienced rappers Double K, Verbal Jint, 45RPM, MC Sniper, Miryo, Hoony Hoon, Joosuc, and Garion with rookie rappers. Notable contestants included Cheetah, one of the show's few female rappers, who would later become the winner of the first season of SMTM spin-off, Unpretty Rapstar.

Rookie rapper Loco, under the mentorship of Double K, won the competition and went on to sign with hip hop label AOMG. He later appeared on season 4 as a producer.

== Season 2 (2013) ==
The second season of SMTM began airing on June 7, 2013, and was again hosted by Eun Ji-won. Contestants were split into two hip hop crews. Meta Crew (led by rapper MC Meta of the group Garion) consisted of Zizo, Soul Dive, Mad Clown, Outsider, J'Kyun, Wutan, and Koala. Meanwhile, Lee Hyun Do (formerly of '90s hip hop duo Deux) led D.O Crew, which consisted of Lexy, Baechigi, DinDin, Swings, Kanto, Jo Woo-jin, and King Kong.

The winner of the second season was hip hop trio Soul Dive, mentored by MC Meta.

== Season 3 (2014) ==
The third season of SMTM began airing on July 3, 2014, and was hosted by Kim Jin-pyo. Contestants were mentored and judged by four teams of rapper "producers", including Tablo and Masta Wu (Team YG); Dok2 and The Quiett (Team Illionaire); Swings and San E (Team Brand New Music); and Yang Dong-geun (Team YDG).

The winner of this season was Team Illionaire's Bobby, a member of K-pop group IKon. Rounding out the top six contestants who participated in the finals were Giriboy, Olltii, C Jamm, Vasco, and Iron.

== Season 4 (2015) ==
The fourth season of SMTM began airing on June 26, 2015. The season again featured four teams of judges: Jinusean and Tablo (YG Entertainment); San E and Verbal Jint (Brand New Music); Jay Park and season one winner Loco (AOMG); and Zico and Paloalto (Hi-Lite Records).

The winner of this season was Basick with his producer team of San E and Verbal Jint from Brand New Music. The other contestants who made it to the finals were Mino, Black Nut, Innovator, Lil Boi, and Incredivle.

== Season 5 (2016) ==
The fifth season of SMTM featured four different producer teams consisting of: Simon Dominic and Gray (AOMG); Kush and Zion.T (YG Entertainment); Dok2 and The Quiett (Illionaire Records); and Gill and Mad Clown. This season held auditions in Los Angeles for the first time with guest judge Timbaland.

This season's winner was Bewhy with his producer team of Simon Dominic and Gray from AOMG. The other five finalists were Reddy, Xitsuh, #Gun, Superbee, and C Jamm.

== Season 6 (2017) ==
The sixth season of SMTM aired from June 30, 2017, to September 1, 2017. The sixth season had four producer teams: Zico and Dean; Choiza and Gaeko of Dynamic Duo; Tiger JK and Bizzy; and Jay Park and Dok2. American artist and producer Swizz Beatz was a special judge for the New York auditions of the show.

This season drew more participants than ever before. For "Show Me the Money 5", approximately 9,000 people auditioned to have a chance to compete on the show. "Show Me the Money 6" had over 12,000 people interested in auditioning for the show—the largest applicant pool the show ever had. As a result of the huge number of applicants, the first round of auditions in Korea took place over the course of two days. First round auditions occurred April 29–30 at Samsan World Gymnasium in Incheon. This was also the first time that auditions were held in New York City. The format for the New York auditions will be the same as the first round auditions in South Korea. New York auditions took place on May 6 at Brooklyn Studios. The Los Angeles auditions were held on May 9 at LA Anderson Warehouse.

The winner of this season was Rhythm Power's Hangzoo with his producer team of Zico and Dean. Hanhae, Jo Woo-chan, Junoflo, Woo Won-jae, and Nucksal also competed in the season finals.

== Season 7 (2018) ==
The seventh season of SMTM was known as "Show Me The Money 777" (read as "Triple 7") and began airing on September 7, 2018. The seventh season featured four producer teams: Swings and Giriboy; Deepflow and Nucksal; Code Kunst and Paloalto; and The Quiett and Changmo. Rappers from previous seasons or from Mnet's High School Rapper series and new rappers participated.

Different from previous seasons, this season did not have the first preliminary round. Instead, the production crew watched over 13,000 audition videos and selected about 1,000 contestants. These selected contestants then were judged by the producers teams, and the qualified ones moved on to the second round, the usual One-minute rap round. This season, the difference in the round was that it was viewed by all remaining contestants. There was also a new betting system used in the show.

The winner for this season was Nafla with his producer team of Team Just Music.

== Season 8 (2019) ==
The eighth season of SMTM began airing from July 26, 2019. Different from previous seasons, when there were four producer teams, the eighth season featured two producer crews, one consisting of Swings, Mad Clown, Kid Milli and Boycold, with the other consisting of Verbal Jint, Giriboy, Bewhy and Millic. Rappers from previous seasons or from Mnet's High School Rapper series and new rappers have participated.

Similar to the previous season, the production crew watched about 16,000 audition clips and selected about 2,000 contestants to be judged by the crews in the first round. The difference in the first round in this season was that if a contestant failed the first judging from a member of one crew, he/she could choose to go for the second judging by a member of the other crew. If the contestant managed to pass the second judging, he/she would proceed to the second round.

The winner for this season was Punchnello with his producer crew of BGM-v Crew.

== Season 9 (2020) ==
Season 9 aired its first episode on October 16, 2020. The season consists of four producing teams: Dynamic Duo & Bewhy, Paloalto & Code Kunst, Zion.T & Giriboy, and Justhis & GroovyRoom. Rappers from previous seasons or from Mnet's High School Rapper series and new rappers have participated.

For this season, there are about 23,000 applicants. The season's winner will be labelled as the "Young Boss". In addition, the winner will have ₩100,000,000 in cash and the launching of a one-year project label for his/her music activities, totaling up to ₩500,000,000.

The winner for this season was Lil Boi with Team Zion.T & Giriboy as the winning producer team. With this win, Giriboy becomes the first ever three-time winning producer of the show after winning three straight seasons. (previously won in season 777 with Team Just Music, and in season 8 with BGM-v crew)

== Season 10 (2021) ==
The tenth season of Show Me the Money (known as Show Me the Money 10: The Original) premiered on October 1, 2021. It broadcast every Friday at 23:00 (KST) on Mnet. The season featured four new producer teams, consisting of Yumdda & Toil, Gaeko & Code Kunst, Gray & Mino, Zion.T & Slom.

This season saw approximately 27,000 applicants. The increase in the number of contestants joining the show was mainly due to the increasing financial difficulties most rappers face due to the ongoing COVID-19 pandemic. With the lack of in-person concerts, events, and gigs happening, most of them now focused on online streaming and web-content platforms which does not provide as much income. With the great success of season 9, the contestants see the show as a path to success where they could be discovered and produce chart-hitting songs.

This season carried out a "10th Anniversary Project" that crossed broadcasting, online and Over The Top platforms under the concept of "The Original", celebrating the show's rich history of serving as a forefront of the Korean Hip-Hop scene, as well as the emergence of up and coming Korean artists who joined the show.

The winner of this season was Jo Gwang-il, with Team Gaeko & Code Kunst as the winning producer team. He received prize money of ₩300,000,000 plus album production and a one-month stay in a luxury suite.

== Season 11 (2022) ==
The eleventh season of Show Me the Money (Show Me the Money 11: The New One) began airing from October 21, 2022. The season features four new producer teams in Lil Boi & GroovyRoom, Jay Park & Slom, The Quiett & Leellamarz, and Justhis & R. Tee. Open auditions for the season were held from July 1 to 30, 2022. Auditions were also held in Los Angeles, United States on August 13 and 14, with Jay Park and Justhis judging the contestants who auditioned for it. This was the show's first auditions in the United States after 5 years, when it was done for Season 6.

The season saw about 30,000 applicants.

The winner of this season was Lee Young-ji, with Jay Park & Slom as the winning producer team. She is the first female winner in "Show Me the Money" history.

== Season 12 (2026) ==
Through a teaser video released on July 21, 2025, Mnet confirmed that Show Me the Money would return for Season 12, three years after Season 11. For this season, four new producer teams were named: Zico & Crush, Gray & Loco, J-Tong & Hukky Shibaseki, and Lil Moshpit & Jay Park. Open auditions for the season were held from August 20 to September 26. Season 12 would begin airing on January 15, 2026, on Thursdays at 21:20 (KST) on Mnet and TVING.

The season saw about 36,000 applicants, the highest number throughout the series.

In addition, for this season, a spin-off titled Show Me The Money 12: Yaksha's World would concurrently air on Saturdays beginning January 17 via TVING, where several contestants who were eliminated from the first, second, and third rounds of the main show compete with one another, and only three contestants would be revived to continue on the main show. Homies, Loopy, Kaogaii, Reddy, Apro, Yungin, Hangzoo (Rhythm Power), Ian Kash and Rad Museum would serve as the spin-off's masters. The spin-off concluded on February 14, with Mason Home, YLN Foreign, and Nowimyoung being revived into the main show beginning the fourth round.

The winner of this season was Haon, with Zico & Crush as the winning producer team.

== International versions ==
Country	Local Name	Host	Network	Year Aired
Thailand	โชว์มีเดอะมันนี่ ไทยแลนด์	Ketadesawad Palkawong Na Ayuthaya	True4U	April 24, 2018 – present
Vietnam	Thế giới Rap - King of Rap	Phí Linh, Goku	VTV3	August 1, 2020 – November 14, 2020

== Plagiarism controversy ==
In 2017, CJ E&M, the production company behind Show Me the Money, accused the creators of the Chinese rap competition show, The Rap of China, of plagiarism. A spokesperson for CJ E&M said that even though the logo, rules, and formats of the two shows were strikingly similar, The Rap of China was not a licensed version of the original South Korean show.

== Impact on Korean hip-hop ==
According to Asia Economy, Show Me the Money proved the marketability of hip-hop and familiarized the public with hip-hop culture. However, it also made the hip hop market lose diversity and grow "deformedly".
