= Rhythm Power =

South Korean hip hop group

Rhythm Power 리듬파워
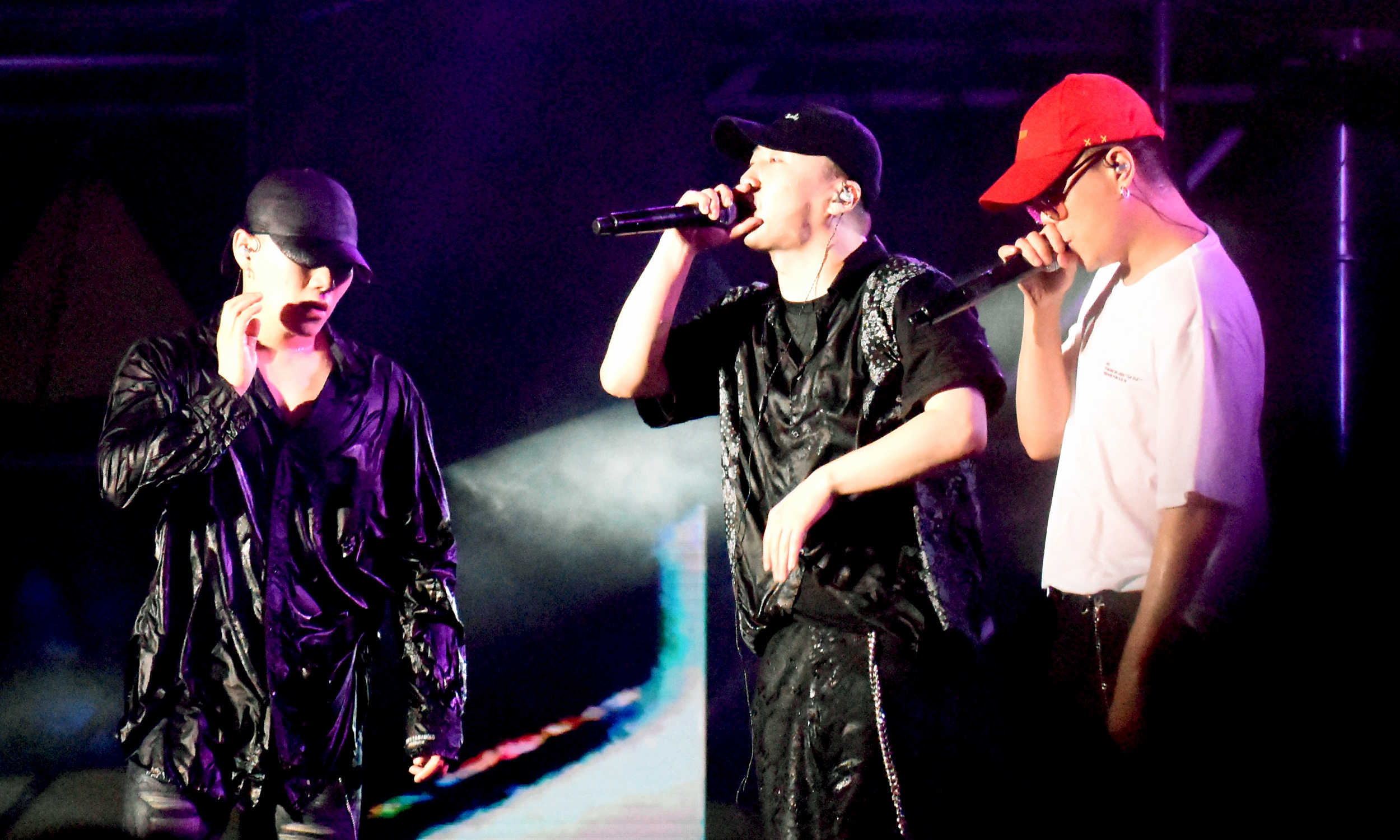
- Rhythm Power at the Busan Sea Festival, August 2018

Background information
- Origin: South Korea
- Genres: Korean hip hop, Grime
- Years active: 2008–present
- Labels: Amoeba Culture; Team Play Music
- Members: Hangzoo; Boi B Geegooin

Rhythm Power (Korean: 리듬파워) is a South Korean hip hop group that consists of rappers Hangzoo, Boi B and Geegooin. They were managed by the hip hop record label Amoeba Culture. The three group members have been childhood friends and started performing together as a group in the underground hiphop scene using the name Bang Sa Neung (Korean: 방사능). The group was later signed by the hip hop label Amoeba Culture and was renamed as Rhythm Power. The group gained mainstream popularity through the participation of the South Korean rap competition Show Me the Money, with member Geegooin reaching top 10 in Show Me the Money 4 in 2015, Boi B reaching top 10 in Show Me the Money 5 in 2016, and Hangzoo becoming the winner of Show Me the Money 6 in 2017. All of the members are from Incheon and often write about the city in their lyrics. In 2020, all three members left Amoeba Culture and established their own record label, titled Team Play Music.

== Members ==
- Hangzoo (Korean: 행주)
- Boi B (Korean: 보이비)
- Geegooin (Korean: 지구인)

== Discography ==
=== Extended plays ===
Title	Album details	Peak chart positions
Title	Album details	KOR
Rhythm Power (리듬파워)	Released: August 26, 2010; Formats: CD, digital download	—
Everybody Handsome Rhythm Power (누구 하나 빠짐없이 잘생겼다 리듬파워)	Released: July 5, 2012; Label: Amoeba Culture, CJ E&M; Formats: CD, digital download	43
Woldmido Dogs (월미도의 개들)	Released: January 23, 2014; Label: Amoeba Culture, CJ E&M; Formats: CD, digital download	61

=== Single albums ===
Title	Album details	Peak chart positions
Title	Album details	KOR
The Trio: Stage One	Released: October 14, 2013; Label: Amoeba Culture, CJ E&M; Formats: CD, digital download	57

=== Singles ===
Title	Year	Peak chart positions	Sales (DL)	Album
Title	Year	KOR	Sales (DL)	Album
"Rhythm Power" (리듬파워)	2012	—	KOR: 40,409	Rhythm Power
"Real Man" (사나이)	2012	—	KOR: 39,881	Everybody Handsome Rhythm Power
"Get Up" with Nine Muses	2012	—	—	Non-album single
"Bond Girl" with Zion. T	2013	—	KOR: 24,204	The Trio: Stage One
"Game Of Thrones" (왕좌의 게임)	2014	—	—	Wolmido Dogs
"Stupid Love" with Crush	2014	—	—	Wolmido Dogs
"Bangsaneung" (방사능)	2017	—	—	Non-album singles
"Dongseong-ro" (동성로) with Crush	2017	88	KOR: 19,414	Non-album singles
"Capture" with Gray	2018	—	—	Hyena on the Keyboard
"—" denotes releases that did not chart.
