= Boi B =

South Korean rapper

- Genres: Hip hop; Grime
- Occupation: Rapper
- Instrument: Vocals
- Years active: 2010–present
- Label: Amoeba Culture

Kim Seong-kyung (Korean: 김성경), better known by his stage name Boi B (보이비), is a South Korean rapper and member of Rhythm Power. He was a contestant on Show Me the Money 5. He released his first album, Night Vibe, on April 25, 2017.

== Discography ==
=== Extended plays ===
Title	Album details	Peak chart positions	Sales
Title	Album details	KOR	Sales
Night Vibe	Released: April 25, 2017; Label: Amoeba Culture, LOEN Entertainment; Formats: CD, digital download	—	—N/a
"—" denotes releases that did not chart or were not released in that region.

=== Singles ===
Title	Year	Peak chart positions	Sales (DL)	Album
Title	Year	KOR	Sales (DL)	Album
As lead artist
"Swallowtail" (호랑나비) feat. Gill, Rhythm Power, Kim Heung-gook	2016	5	KOR: 720,563	Show Me the Money 5
"ADY" (아침에 다시 얘기해) feat. Sik-K	2017	—	—N/a	Night Vibe
Collaborations
"Time 4 Some Action" (안생겨요) with Eachone	2011	—	—N/a	Non-album single
"Rose of Sharon" (무궁화) with Mad Clown, Donutman, #Gun	2016	12	KOR: 244,242	Show Me the Money 5
"Goblin" (도깨비) with Flowsik, Hash Swan, ₩uNo, G2	2016	25	KOR: 120,785	Show Me the Money 5
"High Five" with Dynamic Duo, Primary, Crush	2016	23	KOR: 82,045	Non-album single
"Reborn" with Jay Park, Double K	2017	—	—N/a	Non-album single
"What Do You Do When You Play?" (놀면 뭐해?) with Gaeko, Choiza, Geegooin, Gray, Crush, Wonstein, Mommy Son, Zior Park and Sam Kim	2019	63	—N/a	Non-album single
"—" denotes releases that did not chart.

== Filmography ==
=== Variety show ===
Year	Title	Network	Note	Ref.
2020	King of Mask Singer	MBC	Contestant as "Kettle" (episode 243)	
