= Stupid in Love (Soyou & Mad Clown song) =

Single by Soyou & Mad Clown
- Released: September 10, 2013
- Recorded: 2013
- Genre: K-pop, dance-pop, electropop
- Length: 4:10
- Label: Starship Entertainment
- Songwriters: Kim Do Hoon, Min Yeon Jae

"Stupid In Love" (Hangul: 착해 빠졌어) is a song by South Korean singer Sistar's Soyou and rapper Mad Clown. It was released online as a digital single on September 10, 2013, through Starship Entertainment.

== Release ==
On September 6, 2013, it was revealed that Soyou and Mad Clown would release a duet "Stupid In Love" on September 10, to celebrate Mad Clown's signing with, Starship Entertainment subsidiary, Starship-X.

"Stupid in Love" was released on September 10, together with the teaser for the music video. The full music video was released on October 1, 2013.

"Stupid in Love" is written by Kim Do-hoon and Min Yeon-jae. The song features Mad Clown's rap skills and Soyou's vocals, the song telling a love story. Mad Clown's raps are reasons why the two should break up and why he believes that this is what she wants and what he thinks will be best for her. This is intertwined with Soyou's vocals asking why he is unable to understand her, and why he misreads her words and actions; that the angry words between them were said not out of a desire to part from him, but out of a desire to be held and loved by him.

== Promotions ==
Soyou & Mad Clown had their debut stage on KBS's Music Bank on September 15, 2013. The duo also performed "Stupid in Love" on various music shows such as M Countdown, Show! Music Core and Inkigayo in September and October.

== Chart performance ==
The song debuted at number 1 for two weeks on South Korea's Gaon Singles Chart and at number 1 on Korea K-Pop Hot 100.

On September 28, 2013, the duo won their very first music show award on Show! Music Core for "Stupid In Love".

== Charts ==
Chart	Peak position
Gaon Singles chart	1
Gaon Mobile Ringtone chart	5
Korea K-Pop Hot 100	1

Year-end charts

Chart (2013)	Position	Notes
Gaon Digital chart	61	92,898,503 Gaon Count
Gaon Download chart	28	1,159,949 downloads

== Credits and personnel ==
- Soyou – vocals
- Mad Clown – rap
- Kim Do Hoon – producing, songwriting, arranger, music
- Min Yeon Jae – producing, songwriting, arranger, music

== Parody ==
The song is used as a recurring gag in the "God of Hip Hop" element of KBS sketch show Gag Concert, with comedians Kim Kiri and Park Bomi respectively taking the rap and vocal roles. Kim Kiri plays the straight man of the duo, his raps are various reasons why the couple should part, Bomi's vocal sections deny that her heart has changed and explains each of Kiri's observations with a twist, for example when accused of having a photograph of another man in her house, she explains that it was her before she had cosmetic surgery.
