= Junoflo =

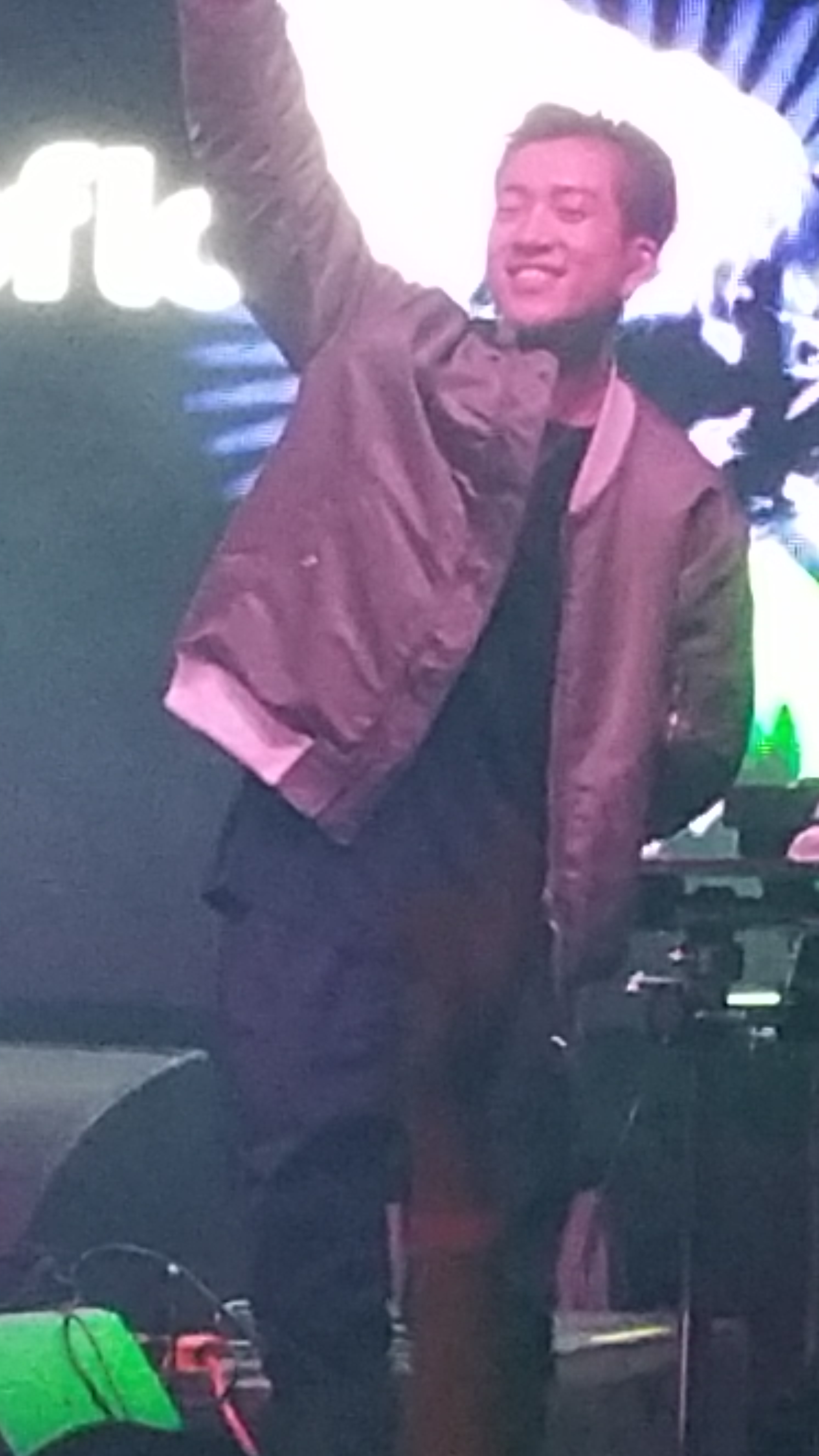
- Junoflo at Korea Spotlight 2018

Background information
- Born: September 25, 1992 (age 33)
- Origin: Fullerton, California, US
- Genres: Hip hop
- Occupation: Rapper
- Instrument: Vocals
- Years active: 2015–present
- Label: Feel Ghood Music
- Website: Official website

Samuel Juno Park (born September 25, 1992), better known as Junoflo (Korean: 주노플로), is an American rapper. He has released three studio albums: Progression (2015), Statues (2019), 222:AM (2020), one extended play: Only Human (2018), and several singles. He was a contestant on the TV series Show Me the Money 5 (2016) Show Me the Money 6 (2017).

== Life and career ==
Samuel Juno Park was raised in Los Angeles, California. He attended college at the University of California, San Diego and worked as a photographer at hip-hop concerts in San Diego.

Junoflo first gained fame through his appearance as a contestant on the South Korean survival reality show, Show Me the Money 5 in 2016. Later that year, he signed to Feel Ghood Music, the hip hop label founded by Korean rapper Tiger JK. In 2017, he appeared on Show Me the Money 6, in which he advanced to the semi-finals.

In March 2018, Junoflo released his first album under Feel Ghood Music, the extended play Only Human. The album includes the single, "Grapevine," featuring Jay Park. In January 2019, he released the full-length album, Statues. That same month, he became the first Korean artist to perform at an NBA halftime show, when he performed at a match between the Los Angeles Clippers and the New Orleans Pelicans.

Junoflo left Feel Ghood Music in April 2019 and relocated back to Los Angeles at the beginning of 2020. He released a 10-track, full-length album, 222:AM in September 2020 with guest features from Ted Park, Jeff Bernat, Manila Grey, Miknna, and others.

== Discography ==
=== Studio albums ===
Title	Album details	Peak chart positions	Sales
Title	Album details	KOR	Sales
Progression	Released: November 1, 2015; Label: CD Baby; Formats: CD, digital download	—	—N/a
Statues	Released: January 9, 2019; Label: Feel Ghood Music; Formats: CD, digital download	75	—N/a
222:AM	Released: September 25, 2020; Label: GLX (Independent); Formats: digital download	—	—N/a

=== Collaborative albums ===
Title	Album details	Peak chart positions	Sales
Title	Album details	KOR	Sales
Smiles And Tribulations with G2	Released: July 30, 2021; Label: GLX (Independent); Formats: digital download	—	—N/a

=== Extended plays ===
Title	Album details	Peak chart positions	Sales
Title	Album details	KOR	Sales
Only Human	Released: March 13, 2018; Label: Feel Ghood Music; Formats: CD, digital download	—	—N/a

=== Singles ===
Title	Year	Peak chart positions	Sales (DL)	Album
Title	Year	KOR	Sales (DL)	Album
As lead artist
"Get Real"	2015	—	—N/a	Progression
"Flo"	2016	—	—N/a	Non-album singles
"Fables"	2016	—	—N/a	Non-album singles
"Deja Vu"	2016	—	—N/a	Non-album singles
"Static" (던져)	2017	—	—N/a	Non-album singles
"Eyes On Me" feat. G.Soul, Dok2	2017	58	KOR: 51,644	Show Me the Money 6
"Twisted" (비틀어) feat. Kim Hyo-eun, Changmo	2017	30	KOR: 89,106	Show Me the Money 6
"Grapevine" (포도주) feat. Jay Park	2018	—	—N/a	Only Human
"La Familia" (식구)	2018	—	—N/a	Statues
"Autopilot" feat. BoA	2018	—	—N/a	Statues
"Statues"	2019	—	—N/a	Statues
"Statues Remix" feat. Bizzy, Double K, Dok2, Tiger JK, Yoon Mi-rae	2019	—	—N/a	Non-album singles
"Made Men"	2019	—	—N/a	Non-album singles
"Acid Freestyle"	2019	—	—N/a	Non-album singles
"Wide Awake"	2019	—	—N/a	Non-album singles
"5eoul AM" feat. G2	2019	—	—N/a	5eoul AM
"Bonez"	2020	—	—N/a	Non-album singles
"On My Line"	2020	—	—N/a	Non-album singles
"Distance" feat. Manila Grey	2020	—	—N/a	222:AM
"Swisha"	2020	—	—N/a	222:AM
"Dead Roses"	2020	—	—N/a	222:AM
"Come Up" feat. Ted Park & Parlay Pass	2020	—	—N/a	222:AM
"Fugazi" feat. G Yamazawa	2020	—	—N/a	Non-album singles
"Message In A Bottle "	2021	—	—N/a	Non-album singles
Collaborations
"Life Is A Gamble" (도박) with Ja Mezz, Ness, Woodie Gochild feat. Jay Park, Dok2	2017	19	KOR: 201,301	Show Me the Money 6
"Supernova" with Curtis Cold feat. WHO$	2020	—	—N/a	Non-album singles
"Bloom" with Horim	2020	—	—N/a	Non-album singles
"OUTLAWZ" with G2	2021	—	—N/a	Smiles And Tribulations
"X&OZ" with G2	2021	—	—N/a	Smiles And Tribulations
"HIGH HOPES" with G2	2021	—	—N/a	Smiles And Tribulations
"WANTED" with G2	2021	—	—N/a	Smiles And Tribulations
"—" denotes releases that did not chart.
