= Mad Clown =

South Korean rapper (born 1985)

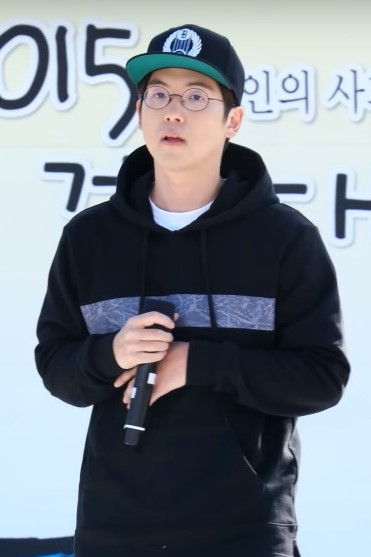
- Mad Clown in 2015
- Born: Jo Dong-rim; March 25, 1985 (age 41); Evanston, Illinois, United States
- Occupations: Rapper; songwriter; record producer
- Spouse: Unknown (m. 2016; div. 2021)
- Children: 1
- Relatives: Jo Hyeon-cheol (brother)
- Musical career
- Origin: South Korea
- Genre: Hip hop
- Years active: 2008–present
- Labels: Soul Company; Starship Entertainment; Sameside Company

Korean name
- Hangul: 조동림
- RR: Jo Dongrim
- MR: Cho Tongnim

Jo Dong-rim (Korean: 조동림; born March 25, 1985), better known by the stage name Mad Clown (Korean: 매드클라운), is an American rapper, songwriter, and record producer. He debuted with the single "Luv Sickness" in 2008 and released his first extended play, Anything Goes, in 2011. He broke into the mainstream following the release of "Stupid in Love," his hit 2013 collaboration with Soyou of the girl group Sistar. He has since released the extended plays Ferocity (2014), Piece of Mine (2015), Love is a Dog From Hell (2017), and 0 (2020).

== Early life ==
Jo Dong-rim was born just outside of Chicago in Evanston, Illinois, on March 25, 1985. He and his parents moved back to South Korea when he was around one year old. His family sent him back to the U.S. to study when he was 14. Growing up, he was heavily influenced by Rapper 2Pac. He was pursuing a degree in sociology in the U.S. but later left his studies to continue to pursue music.

== Career ==
=== 2008–2012: Debut and early career ===
Mad Clown debuted in 2008 and released his first EP in 2011.

=== 2013–2018: Starship Entertainment, collaborations, and television judge ===
He has worked on several collaborations, including Stupid in Love with South Korean singer Soyou from the South Korean group Sistar, released on September 10, 2013.

On March 28, 2014, Starship Entertainment announced on their Twitter account that Sistar's Hyolyn would feature in Mad Clown's comeback track, "Without You". The music video for "Without You" was released on April 3, 2014.

On December 12, 2014, Mad Clown featured on "Anxious" by Melody Day. In December, he also began working as a mentor on No.Mercy, a survival show of trainees from Starship Entertainment which led to the formation of Monsta X. In 2015, he featured on Jooheon of Monsta X's first mixtape, SUPEXX.

Mad Clown released his third extended play Piece of Mine in January 2015.

In 2016, he was a judge and producer for the fifth season of Show Me the Money.

In 2018, Mad Clown did not renew his contract with Starship. That year, he also participated in the seventh season of "Show Me The Money" under the alias of "MOMMY SON", donning a pink ski mask to cover his appearance. After being eliminated from the show, he released the song, "Shonen Jump (ft. Bae Gisung)" in mock retaliation against those who eliminated him. He also performed the song during the filming of the final episode of the show.

=== 2019–present: New label, more collaborations, further releases ===
In January 2019, Mad Clown collaborated with Stella Jang, releasing the single "No Question".

In September 2020, Mad Clown announced his first EP following his departure from Starship. The album, titled 0, was released on October 6 through Sameside Company and has four ballads.

== Personal life ==
Mad Clown's younger brother is film and television actor Jo Hyeon-cheol.

Mad Clown married his non-celebrity wife on May 15, 2016, after a year of dating. He has a child, a son.

On September 22, 2022, Mad Clown revealed that he divorced his non-celebrity wife the year prior after 5 years of marriage.

== Discography ==
=== Extended plays ===
Title	Album details	Peak chart positions	Sales
Title	Album details	KOR	Sales
Anything Goes	Released: November 4, 2011; Label: Soul Company; Formats: CD, digital download	55	—N/a
Ferocity (표독)	Released: April 4, 2014; Label: Starship Entertainment; Formats: CD, digital download	21	KOR: 1,070
Piece of Mine	Released: January 9, 2015; Label: Starship Entertainment; Formats: CD, digital download	8	KOR: 1,492
Love is a Dog From Hell (사랑은 지옥에서 온 개)	Released: March 16, 2017; Label: Starship Entertainment; Formats: CD, digital download	26	KOR: 657
0	Released: October 6, 2020; Label: Sameside Company; Formats: Digital download	—	—N/a
"—" denotes releases that did not chart.

=== Singles ===
Title	Year	Peak chart positions	Sales	Album
Title	Year	KOR	Sales	Album
"Luv Sickness" feat. Junggigo	2008	—	—N/a	Non-album singles
"Farewell" (이별은) feat. DC	2008	—	—N/a	Non-album singles
"Basil" (바질) feat. Brother Su	2011	—	—N/a	Anything Goes
"Stupid In Love" (착해 빠졌어) with Soyou	2013	1	KOR: 1,159,949	Non-album singles
"Brilliant Is..." with Skull, Haha, Geeks, Zico, Swings, Double K, Zizo, Soul Dive, Heo Kyung-hwan, Kim Ji-min feat. Gill, Jungin	2013	75	—N/a	Non-album singles
"Without You" (견딜만해) feat. Hyolyn	2014	4	KOR: 967,646	Ferocity
"Love Is You" with Starship Entertainment artists	2014	10		Non-album singles
"Fire" (화) feat. Jinsil	2015	1	KOR: 1,087,147	Piece of Mine
"Get Low" (털어) with Jooheon	2015	65	KOR: 74,428	Non-album singles
"Sour Grapes" (못먹는 감) with San E	2015	2	KOR: 774,942	Non-album singles
"Softly" (사르르) with Starship Entertainment artists	2015	24		Non-album singles
"Like Romance Comics" (만화처럼) with Brother Su	2016	17	KOR: 125,593	Non-album singles
"H.ear Your Colors" (알록달록) feat. Jooheon	2016	57	KOR: 42,946	Non-album singles
"What Was That" (그게 뭐라고) with K.Will	2016	14		Non-album singles
"Lie" (거짓말) feat. Lee Hae-ri	2016	10	KOR: 367,398	Non-album singles
"Love Wishes" (누가 그래) with Starship Entertainment artists	2016	77		Non-album singles
"Lost Without You" (우리집을 못 찾겠군요) feat. Bolbbalgan4	2017	5	KOR: 1,012,764	Love is a Dog From Hell
"Love is a Dog From Hell" (사랑은 지옥에서 온 개) feat. Suran	2017	17	KOR: 137,618	Love is a Dog From Hell
"Wash!Wash" (세탁중) with Justhis	2017	—	—N/a	Non-album singles
"Christmas Day" (크리스마스데이) with Starship Entertainment artists	2017	63	—N/a	Non-album singles
"Butterfly" (너랑나랑노랑) with San E feat. Bumkey	2018	—	—N/a	Non-album singles
"Thirst" (갈증) with Ailee	2018	—	—N/a	Non-album singles
"No Question" with Stella Jang	2019	47	—N/a	Non-album singles
"Old couple" (용기내지 마세요) feat. Kim Young Heum	2020	—	—N/a	0
"Heaven" (새주소) feat. Jin Minho	2020	—	—N/a	0
"I Miss You" (보고 싶단 말이야) with Punch	2021	97	—N/a	Non-album singles
"—" denotes releases that did not chart.

=== Soundtrack appearances ===
Title	Year	Peak chart positions	Sales	Album
Title	Year	KOR	Sales	Album
"Chocolate Cherry Night" (쇼콜라 체리밤) with Yozoh	2014	—	—N/a	Hi! School-Love On OST
"0 (Young)" with Giriboy, Jooyoung feat. No.Mercy contestants	2015	71	KOR: 43,760	No.Mercy OST
"Once Again" (다시 너를) with Kim Na-young	2016	2	KOR: 1,056,319	Descendants of the Sun OST
"Rose of Sharon" (무궁화) with Donutman, Boi B, #Gun	2016	12	KOR: 244,242	Show Me the Money 5 OST
"Going Home" (비행소년) with #Gun feat. Gummy	2016	6	KOR: 433,732	Show Me the Money 5 OST
"Bad Blood" (나쁜 피)	2016	—	KOR: 27,111	Show Me the Money 5 OST
"Bully" (엄석대) with snzae	2017	—	—N/a	High School Rapper OST
"Tonight" (오늘 밤) with BoA	2017	90	—N/a	Hit the Top OST
"When It Rains" (비가 오면) with Soyou	2018	—	—N/a	The Third Charm OST
"In My Head"	2019	—	—N/a	Voice 3 OST
"Not Enough (Prod. BOYCOLD)" (담아) with Swings & Kid Milli, feat. YUMDDA & pH-1	2019	37	—N/a	Show Me the Money 8 OST
"—" denotes releases that did not chart.

=== Other charted songs ===
Title	Year	Peak chart positions	Sales	Album
Title	Year	KOR	Sales	Album
"Stalker" (스토커) feat. Crucial Star	2014	20	KOR: 222,519	Ferocity
"Ganggab" (깽값) feat. Jooheon	2014	67	KOR: 66,904	Ferocity
"Your Scent" (살냄새) feat. Brother Su	2014	60	KOR: 68,996	Ferocity
"Gum" (껌) feat. Fana, Oh Ji-eun	2014	72	KOR: 59,328	Ferocity
"Hide & Seek" (콩) feat. Jooyoung	2015	24	KOR: 107,061	Piece of Mine
"Battle Cry" (때려박는 랩)	2015	59	KOR: 63,089	Piece of Mine
"Coffee Copy Girl" (커피카피아가씨)	2015	79	KOR: 40,007	Piece of Mine
"Flowers" (꽃) feat. Paloalto, Justhis, G2	2015	—	KOR: 35,188	Piece of Mine
"Population Control"	2015	—	KOR: 29,987	Piece of Mine
"Lonely Animals" (외로운 동물) with San E feat. Brother Su	2015	44	KOR: 66,518	Non-album single
"—" denotes releases that did not chart.

== Filmography ==
=== Television ===
Year	Program	Network	Notes
2013	Show Me The Money 2	Mnet	Contestant
2016	Show Me The Money 5	Mnet	Judge/Producer with Gill
2017	High School Rapper 1	Mnet	Judge
2018	Show Me The Money 777	Mnet	Contestant
2019	Show Me The Money 8	Mnet	Judge/Producer with Swings, Kid Milli, and Boycold

== Awards and nominations ==
=== Gaon Chart Music Awards ===
Year	Category	Nominated work	Result	Ref
2013	Song of the Year (September)	"Stupid In Love" (with Soyou)	Won	
2015	Song of the Year (January)	"Fire"	Won	

=== Golden Disc Awards ===
Year	Category	Nominated work	Result	Ref
2018	Digital Song Bonsang	"Lost Without You" (ft. Bol4)"	Nominated	
2018	Global Popular Artist Award	Mad Clown	Nominated	

=== Melon Music Awards ===
Year	Category	Nominated work	Result	Ref
2015	Best Rap & Hip Hop Song	"Fire"	Won	

=== Mnet Asian Music Awards ===
Year	Category	Nominated work	Result	Ref
2015	Best Rap Performance	"Fire"	Nominated	
