= Woodz =

South Korean musician (born 1996)

- Woodz in 2026
- Born: Cho Seung-youn; August 5, 1996 (age 30); Seongnam, Gyeonggi, South Korea
- Other name: Luizy
- Education: Global Cyber University
- Occupations: Singer; songwriter; rapper; record producer
- Musical career
- Genres: K-pop; R&B; hip hop
- Instruments: Vocals; guitar
- Years active: 2014–present
- Labels: Yuehua; Swing; Edam
- Member of: Uniq
- Formerly of: X1; M.O.L.A
- Website: edam-ent.com/eng/sub03/sub03_0303_view

Korean name
- Hangul: 조승연
- RR: Jo Seungyeon
- MR: Cho Sŭngyŏn

Signature
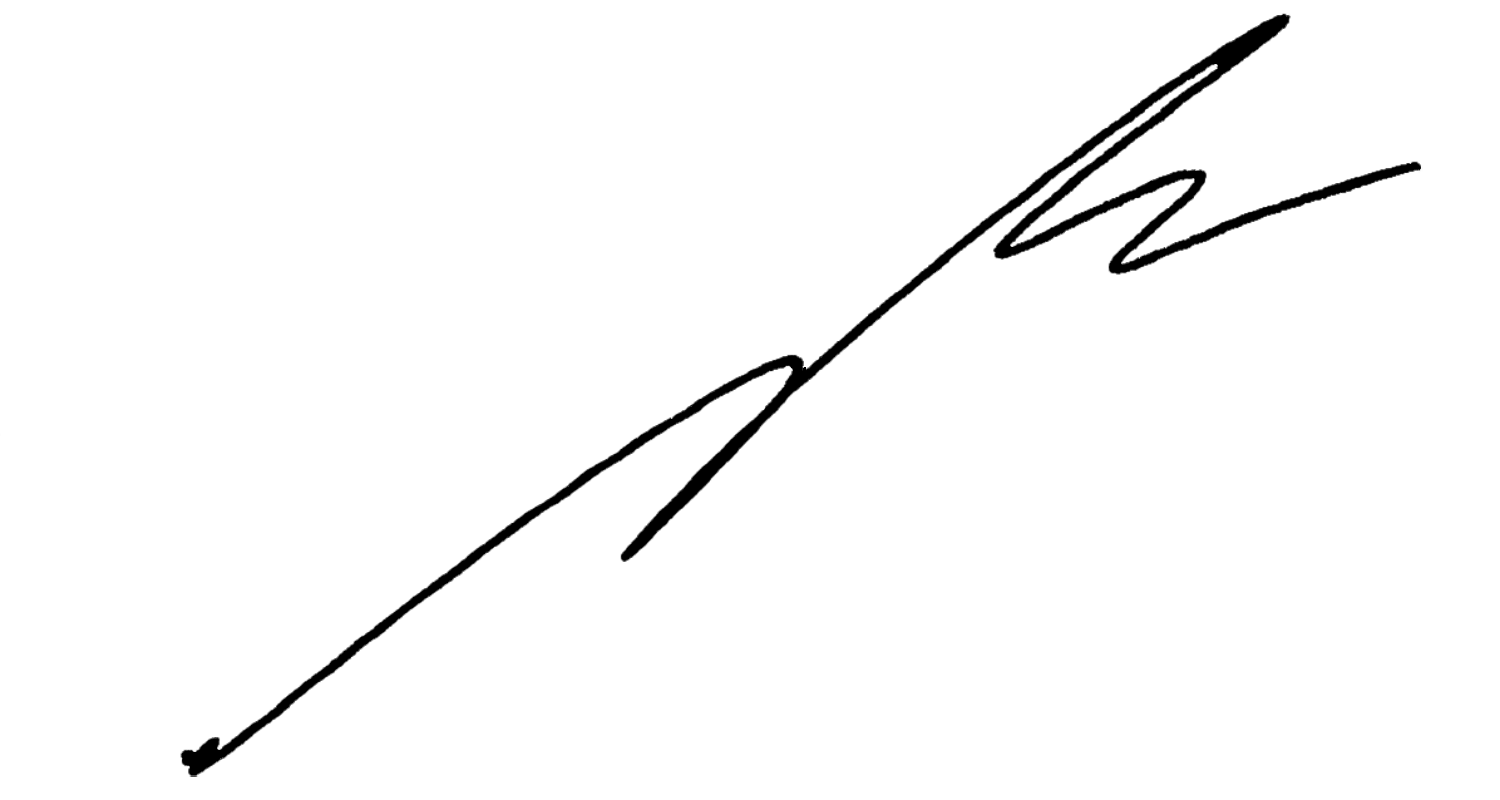

Cho Seung-youn (Korean: 조승연, born August 5, 1996), known professionally as Woodz (우즈), is a South Korean singer-songwriter, rapper, and record producer. He rose to fame as the main rapper of the South Korean-Chinese boy band Uniq, formed by Yuehua Entertainment in 2014, before co-founding the musical collectives M.O.L.A in 2015 and Drinkcolor in 2016. He co-founded his personal production team, Team HOW, in 2018. He is a former member of the South Korean boy group X1.

Following an appearance on the fifth season of the South Korean rap competition show Show Me the Money, Woodz debuted as a solo artist under the stage name Luizy in July 2016, with the release of the collaborative hip-hop single "Recipe". He changed his stage name to Woodz in 2018 to accommodate shifts in musical direction. His releases as Woodz—including the singles "Pool", "Different", and "Meaningless"—delved into alternative R&B and featured heavier emphasis on vocals. In addition, to his solo work, he has written and produced songs for artists in both his native South Korea and China, as well as for the shows The Unit: Idol Rebooting Project and Idol Producer.

In 2019, Woodz participated in the South Korean survival show Produce X 101. Finishing in fifth place, he became a member of the show's project boy band, X1, which debuted under Swing Entertainment in August 2019. Following the group's disbandment on January 6, 2020, in the aftermath of the Mnet vote manipulation investigation, Woodz resumed his solo career by releasing his first EP Equal on June 29, 2020, with the lead single "Love Me Harder" (파랗게). In 2025, he achieved his first number-one on the Circle Digital Chart with the song "Drowning" from his fifth EP Oo-Li (2023).

== Early life and education ==
Woodz was born on August 5, 1996, in Seongnam, South Korea. Raised as an only child, his parents both worked as businesspeople: his mother owned a Chinese restaurant in Cheongdam-dong as well as a travel agency in Sinsa-dong, both in the Gangnam district of Seoul; his father owned a Korean restaurant in the Philippines. Due to his family's business obligations, he often moved during his childhood.

Initially intending to pursue a professional career in association football, Woodz was accepted into the youth development system of Campeonato Brasileiro Série A club Sport Club Corinthians Paulista and moved to Brazil in his final year of elementary school, during which he resided in the São Paulo municipalities of Penápolis and Santos. As a teenager, he played as a main striker for Sport Club Corinthians Paulista's junior affiliate team for two years; as is customary for Brazilian football players, he adopted a Portuguese mononym, Luizinho. He later attended Reedley International School in Manila, Philippines, for one year to learn English.

Growing up, Woodz was not fond of urban music and K-pop, and primarily listened to Korean ballad. However, he began watching episodes of the South Korean music program Music Bank to cope with homesickness while studying abroad. Inspired by the song "Let's Go On a Vacation" by Lee Seung-gi, Woodz returned to South Korea to pursue a musical career. He enrolled in Hanlim Multi Art School in the Practical Dance Department one year late due to his time overseas. After graduating in 2016, he was admitted to Dong-ah Institute of Media and Arts' Division of Entertainment in Broadcasting. Woodz later transferred to Global Cyber University, enrolling in the Department of Entertainment and Media.

== Career ==
=== 2014–2015: Career beginnings ===
Woodz auditioned more than 50 times for various entertainment companies, such as SM Entertainment and JYP Entertainment, before being accepted as a trainee at YG Entertainment. He trained at YG for one and a half years before he joined the Uniq pre-debut team. Uniq, a multinational collaboration managed by the Chinese company Yuehua Entertainment, had members trained by both Yuehua Entertainment and YG Entertainment in the lead up to their official debut in both China and South Korea. Woodz's first public appearance with Uniq was on October 16, 2014, when the group performed on the music program M Countdown. Their debut single "Falling in Love", recorded in both Mandarin and Korean, was released in both China and South Korea four days later on October 20. Their first mini album EOEO, also recorded in both Mandarin and Korean, was released in both countries on April 24, 2015.

As the group's main rapper and sub-vocalist, Woodz was involved in Uniq's musical direction from their debut, penning his own rap verses and other lyrics for their Korean releases. When Uniq's Korean promotions as a full group became more infrequent in the latter half of 2015 due to rising political tensions between China and South Korea, members of the group began pursuing solo activities such as acting; however, Woodz expressed a desire to focus his career as a musician instead. On August 14, 2015, the formation of the musical collective M.O.L.A was announced via the release of the song "My Way" on YouTube, featuring Woodz as one of its founding members alongside 15&'s Park Ji-min and producer Nathan. Three additional members—Pentagon's Kino, Seventeen's Vernon, and guitarist Hoho—later joined the collective.

=== 2016–2018: Solo debut and foray into music production ===
In 2016, Woodz applied to participate in the rap competition show Show Me the Money 5; he had previously applied for the show's fourth season but was unable to participate due to conflicts with Uniq's EOEO promotions. Although he was eliminated, he drew positive attention from viewers. After his appearance on Show Me the Money 5, he co-founded the production crew Drinkcolor alongside fellow producers Eden, Oddtom, and M.O.L.A member Nathan on July 26, 2016. Woodz made his solo debut under the stage name Luizy, derived from his Portuguese name Luizinho, three days later on July 29, with the self-produced hip-hop single "Recipe", a collaboration with rapper Flowsik. The two wrote the track together after becoming friends while competing on Show Me the Money. Woodz subsequently released the single "Baby Ride" featuring Im Hyun-sik of BtoB on August 14, 2016. Woodz collaborated with Im again in March 2017 on the single "Eating Alone", included on the soundtrack for the music variety show Sing For You. Six months later, he featured on Lee Gi-kwang's song "Dream".

In November 2017, music publishing and production company Iconic Sounds announced that Woodz had been invited to participate in their annual songwriting and production camp. There, he met singer-songwriter Sophia Pae, with whom he would co-produce the song "Always". (Note: Cho is not officially credited by the Korea Music Copyright Association for "Always"; however, it was disclosed in official supplemental information for THE UNI+ G STEP 1 that he had co-produced the song. Original text from Melon: ""Always"는 최근 Fromis_9의 유리구두를 작업한 아이코닉 사운즈의 Sophia [Pae] 프로듀서가 작업한 곡으로 [...] 이번 곡은 또한 스웨덴 유명 프로듀싱 팀 Hitfire의 프로듀서 Simon Janlöv와 아이코닉 신인 프로듀서 조승연이 함께 작업한 곡으로 ..." (Translation: ""Always" is a song made by ICONIC SOUNDS producer Sophia [Pae], who also recently worked on Fromis 9's "Glass Shoes". [...] The song was co-produced by Simon Janlöv, a member of the famous Swedish production team Hitfire, and rookie ICONIC SOUNDS producer Cho Seung-youn ...")) The song was later featured on the survival show The Unit: Idol Rebooting Project in January 2018, performed by the unit Blossom, and released as a digital single as part of the show's fourth mission. This marked Woodz's first time producing a track for another artist and a brief transitional period in which he ceased using the name Luizy, instead being credited under his legal name. (Note: While his releases as Luizy would occasionally also include his given name 승연, or Seung-youn, the entry for "Always" in official album information for THE UNI+ G STEP 1 instead refers to him by his full name, 조승연, or Cho Seung-youn, with no mention of other aliases.)

Woodz was first credited under his current stage name in February 2018 with the release of singer and producer Eden's album Ryu: 川, on which he co-produced the track "93" and featured on the track "Dance". As Woodz, he continued to write and produce songs for other artists in the following months, beginning with the debut evaluation song "It's Ok" for the Chinese survival show Idol Producer in April 2018. Yuehua Entertainment announced that he would officially start using the stage name Woodz during his promotions as a soloist in May 2018; he released the digital single "Pool" on May 12, 2018, followed by "Different" on July 21. Both songs were co-produced by Woodz and AOMG's Cha Cha Malone. That month, Woodz co-produced the single "Zigzag" for C-pop project group MR-X; he would also co-produce their next single "I Don't Wanna Fight Tonight", released two months later. In August, singer and musician Jun released his solo debut single "Hold It Down", which Woodz wrote and co-produced. In the same month, he co-produced the song "Evanesce II" for Super Junior-D&E's third EP 'Bout You. In October, R&B singer Babylon released the album Caelo, on which Woodz co-wrote and produced the tracks "Sincerity" and "Drive".

In a further expansion of his creative independence, Woodz revealed the formation of his personal production team, Team How, through the eponymous documentary miniseries How: How Ordinary, We're on October 23, 2018. The team is composed of manager Lee Il-kyu, stylist Kim Hyup, graphic designer Robbroy, and co-producer and fellow M.O.L.A member Nathan. Woodz released the digital single "Meaningless" on November 3, 2018.

=== 2019: Produce X 101 and X1 ===
Woodz remained active in the music industry in the early months of 2019. In January, he co-produced the track "This Night", included on Groovy Room's single of the same name. The following month, boy group ONF released the track "Ice & Fire" from their third EP We Must Love, which Woodz co-wrote and produced. On March 4, 2019, the survival show Produce X 101 began filming; Woodz was first revealed to be participating as a contestant two weeks later on March 20. He continued to work as a lyricist and producer while filming for Produce X 101: in late March, singer-songwriter Suran released her second EP, Jumpin', on which he co-wrote and produced the lead single "Don't Hang Up"; in April, he co-produced "Blossom", a promotional single performed by VIXX's Ravi and GFriend's Eunha for Pepsi and Starship Entertainment's K-pop collaboration project "For the Love of It".

In the second episode of Produce X 101, Woodz auditioned as one of three trainees representing Yuehua Entertainment with the self-written and produced song "Dream". He placed 67th in the show's first ranking in May 2019, and did not enter the top ten until the show's penultimate episode. Woodz finished fifth in the finale on July 19, becoming the trainee with the lowest initial rank to earn a spot in the final lineup of the band X1, and the only debuting trainee to consistently rise in rank over the course of all seasons of Produce 101. He debuted as a member of X1 on August 27, 2019, with the release of the EP Emergency: Quantum Leap. Due to a vote manipulation controversy involving multiple Mnet franchises including Produce X 101, the group ultimately disbanded on January 6, 2020.

=== 2020–present: Return to solo activities ===
Woodz made a solo comeback on June 29, 2020, with his first extended play Equal and its lead single "Love Me Harder" (파랗게). His showcase was held online on the V Live platform on the same day; over 320,000 users watched the showcase concurrently, and it amassed over 200 million "hearts" on the platform. Woodz promoted "Love Me Harder" (파랗게) and the B-side track "Accident" on Korean music shows; he also performed other tracks on Equal, such as "Buck". Equal was named 4th Best K-pop Album by critics on Billboard's Top 10 K-pop albums of 2020.

Woodz made another comeback in 2020, with the release of his second extended play Woops! and its lead single "Bump Bump" on November 17. He promoted "Bump Bump" alongside the album track "Trigger" (방아쇠) on South Korean music programs. "Bump Bump" was listed as 6th place by critics on Billboard's 20 Best K-pop Songs of 2020.

Woodz returned with a new single album Set on March 15, 2021, led by the single "Feel Like". He released his third extended play Only Lovers Left on October 5, 2021, featuring the double lead singles "Kiss of Fire" and "Waiting". He co-produced and co-wrote three songs in English for his international fans and expand his repertoire. He achieved his first music program win as a soloist on The Show.

Woodz released his fourth extended play Colorful Trauma on May 4, 2022, with the lead single "I Hate You". On July 15, it was announced that Woodz would be holding the Woodz Live Colorful in Bangkok concert in Bangkok, Thailand on September 3.

Woodz's exclusive contract with Yuehua Entertainment expired on October 19, 2022, and he was revealed to have signed an exclusive contract with Edam Entertainment on October 25, becoming their first male artist.

In February 2023, Edam Entertainment released a teaser for the song "Abyss" from Woodz's fifth EP, Oo-Li, which was released as a pre-release single on February 22. Oo-Li was released on April 26 with the lead single "Journey". In December 2023, Oo-Li was named 3rd Best K-pop Album of 2023 on Billboard's Best 25 K-pop Albums of 2023. "Abyss" was named 12th best K-pop song of 2023 by Paste Magazine, and "Who Knows", another single from the album, was listed in Dazed's 50 Best K-pop Tracks of 2023.

Another single from Oo-Li, "Drowning", reached number one on the Circle Digital Chart in May 2025, over two years after its release. "Drowning" also finished at the number one position of the annual charts of major streaming services including Melon, Bugs, Genie and the Circle Digital Chart, and at second place on the annual charts of Apple Music and YouTube Music in South Korea. In May 2026, "Drowning" also set the record for longest charting song on Melon's top 10 charts at 70 weeks, surpassing the previous records held by NewJeans' Hype Boy at 49 weeks and BTS' Dynamite at 36 weeks.

In 2025, Woodz was named in Forbes Korea's Top 30 Korean Idols of the Year 2025.

On February 25, 2026, Woodz made his acting debut as the lead in the autofiction short art film Slide Strum Mute.

Woodz's first studio album Archive. 1 was released on March 4, 2026, with the lead singles "Human Extinction" and "NA NA NA".

On July 23, it was announced that Woodz would make his commercial acting debut in the film Nambeol, following his initial acting debut earlier that year.

== Personal life ==
=== Military enlistment ===
On December 10, 2023, Woodz announced through his fancafe that he will fulfill his military mandatory service as an active soldier on January 22, 2024. He was officially discharged on July 21, 2025.

== Artistry ==
As a soloist, Woodz has written all of his lyrics and produced most of his music. (Note: Of the songs in which Cho is credited as an individual, he was not involved in producing the collaborative single "Eating Alone" (혼밥) with Im Hyun-sik, and two songs in which he is featured, Lee Gi-kwang's "Dream" (꿈) and Eden's "Dance" (춤).) In the early stages of his career, Woodz's musical style leaned towards hip hop, with his releases under the name Luizy also incorporating pop and electronic music. However, the change of his stage name as a soloist to Woodz in 2018 was accompanied by a change in musical direction, described by Status Magazine as an "[evolution] into a more realized identity". As opposed to his "poppier" approach as Luizy, Woodz characterizes his later production style as "mostly [...] R&B" but states that he is "not picky about the genre". Commentators have also noted his experimentation with genres, with his music as Woodz described as incorporating elements of alternative R&B, atmospheric music, and dream pop while retaining a "signature climatic sound". In a further contrast to his early artistry, during which he was primarily a rapper, his releases as Woodz more heavily feature his vocals. In retrospect, Woodz described the difference between his personas as a "matter of maturity", with the shift to the more "mature" Woodz identity allowing him to distance himself from his "comparatively young" and immature identity as Luizy.

Woodz's songs have featured a variety of concepts and themes. "Recipe", released shortly after his elimination from Show Me the Money 5, was noted to express "ambition" and defiance in the face of public scrutiny, while "Baby Ride" was characterized as a "cool, cheerful" song that helps listeners "escape the midsummer heat". Contrasting aspects of love and relationships were often themes of his subsequent releases as Woodz: "Pool" was described by Status Magazine as a "gleeful", "jubilant love song"; his follow-up single "Different" explored coming to terms with a break-up due to mutual incompatibility, with Maeil Business Newspaper writing that the song's lyrics are a "direct expression of the word 'different'". Compared to his previous work, however, Woodz's single "Meaningless" was described as a "darker" record that tackles more personal and "existential" themes; critics also noted that the song discussed mental health, a topic often considered taboo in South Korea. Woodz referred to "Meaningless" as akin to his "diary".

== Discography ==
- Archive. 1 (2026)

== Videography ==
=== Music videos ===
Year	Title	Director(s)	Notes	Ref.
2016	"RECIPE"	Zanybros	as Luizy, with Flowsik	
2016	"Baby Ride"	Zanybros	as Luizy, with Hyunsik of BtoB	
2018	"POOL"		with Sumin	
2018	"DIFFERENT"	Junghun Ha		
2018	"meaningless"			
2020	"Love Me Harder"	Rigend Film		
2020	"BUMP BUMP"	Woogie Kim		
2021	"FEEL LIKE"	Woogie Kim		
2021	"WAITING"			
2022	"I Hate You"	Ziyong Kim		
2023	"Abyss"	Hobin		
2023	"Journey"	Hobin		
2023	"AMNESIA"	Eehosoo		
2025	"I'll Never Love Again"	Lafic		
2026	"CINEMA"	Yun Kim		
2026	"Human Extinction"	Lafic	starring Park Hee-soon	
2026	"Stray"	Rough Choi		
2026	"OUR STORY"	Ray Yi	with Lee Seung-chul	
2026	"Come into my world!"	Kim Nany		

== Filmography ==
Key
†	Denotes films that have not yet been released

=== Film ===
Year	Title	Role	Notes	Ref.
2016	MBA Partners	Wang Meimei courier	Chinese-language film; cameo	
2016	A Chinese Odyssey Part Three	Zhu Bajie	Chinese-language film; cameo	
2026	Slide Strum Mute	Woo-jin	Short film; main role	
TBA	Nambeol †	Cheot-nom		

=== Television shows ===
Year	Title	Role	Notes	Ref.
2016	Show Me the Money 5	Contestant	Episode 1–4	
2019	Produce X 101	Contestant	Formation of X1; finished 5th place	
2020	King of Mask Singer	Contestant as "Three GO"	Episode 269–270	
2021	Time Out	MC		
2021	Mama The Idol	Comeback summoning team		

=== Radio shows ===
Year	Title	Role	Notes	Ref.
2022	Idol Radio	Temporary DJ	Season 2	

=== Web shows ===
Year	Title	Role	Ref.
2022	Idol Hit Song Festival	Contestant	

=== Music video appearances ===
Year	Title	Artist	Ref.
2015	"Hopeless Love"	Jimin Park	
2016	"I Don't Give A 屑"	Han Geng	

== Awards and nominations ==
Year	Award ceremony	Category	Nominee(s) / Work(s)	Result	Ref.
2020	Golden Disc Awards	Album Division	Equal	Nominated	
2020	First Brand Awards	Male Solo Singer	Woodz	Nominated	
2021	Asia Artist Awards	Male Solo Singer Popularity Award	Woodz	Nominated	
2021	Asia Artist Awards	Best Icon Award	Woodz	Won	
2025	International Music Video Awards	Best Music Video – Honorable Mention	"I'll Never Love Again"	Won	
2025	International Music Video Awards	Best Director	"I'll Never Love Again"	Won	
2025	International Music Video Awards	Best Pacific & Asia Music Video	"I'll Never Love Again"	Won	
2025	Korea Grand Music Awards	Best Music 10	"Drowning"	Won	
2025	Korea Grand Music Awards	Best Popularity – Artist Day	Woodz	Nominated	
2025	Korea Grand Music Awards	Best Memory	Woodz	Nominated	
2025	Korea Grand Music Awards	BIGC Global Star Award	Woodz	Nominated	
2025	Asia Artist Awards	Best Artist – Singer	Woodz	Won	
2025	Melon Music Awards	Hot Trend	Woodz	Won	
2026	Hanteo Music Awards	Best Popular Artist	Woodz	Nominated	
2026	Hanteo Music Awards	Special Award (R&B/Hiphop)	Woodz	Nominated	
2026	Brand of the Year Awards	Best Male Solo Artist	Woodz	Won	
