= Gun (rapper) =

South Korean rapper (born 1994)

1. Gun
- Born: Song Gun-hee; June 26, 1994 (age 31); Seoul, South Korea
- Genres: Hip hop; R&B
- Occupation: Rapper
- Instrument: Vocals
- Years active: 2014–present
- Label: Starship X

Korean name
- Hangul: 송건희
- RR: Song Geonhui
- MR: Song Kŏnhŭi

Song Gun-hee (Korean: 송건희, born June 26, 1994), better known by his stage name #Gun (샵건), is a South Korean rapper. He was a contestant on No.Mercy and Show Me the Money 5.

== Career ==
=== 2014–2016: Pre-debut and competition shows ===
In December 2014, #Gun was announced as one of twelve contestants on Starship Entertainment and Mnet's survival show No.Mercy. While #Gun's rap garnered praise, he made it to the show's finale, but did not make it into the final lineup of Starship's new hip-hop boy group Monsta X.

In 2015 and 2016, #Gun released several mixtapes, through SoundCloud and Starship Entertainment's YouTube channel. His third mixtape, "Reload", was accompanied by a music video.

In 2016, he competed on Show Me the Money 5, but was eliminated in the finals. For the show he collaborated with artists like Mad Clown and Jessi. He was praised for his songwriting and raps on the show.

=== 2016–present: Debut and early career ===
In July 2016, #Gun released his first single "Beep". His second single was released the following year, titled "Sunflower Dance". In November 2017, he featured on producer D.I.'s debut track "Body Talk", alongside Solbin of Laboum.

Nearly a year after his last release, in August 2018, #Gun released the single "Red Light." He participated in the production of the song, as a credited writer and producer.

On April 1, 2019, #Gun released a new single "Aquarium", accompanied by a music video "Aquarium" was noted as a departure from #Gun's earlier sound, described as a more mature R&B song. In July, #Gun released the single "Park", with the B-side "Brake". In August, he released "Lord", with the B-side "Orange Room".

In April 2020, he released the single "Wednesday", with the B-side "Take it all".

== Personal life ==
He is from the Gayang-dong area of Seoul. He is the cousin of Winner's Mino.

== Discography ==
=== Singles ===
Title	Year	Peak chart positions	Sales (DL)	Album
Title	Year	KOR	Sales (DL)	Album
As lead artist
"Crazy Guy" (미친놈) feat. Jessi	2016	5	KOR: 436,901	Show Me the Money 5
"Beep" prod. Giriboy feat. Crucial Star	2016	—	—N/a	Non-album singles
"Sunflower Dance" feat. Kebee	2017	—	—N/a	Non-album singles
"Red Light" prod. Newmaze	2018	—	—N/a	Non-album singles
"Aquarium"	2019	—	—N/a	Non-album singles
"Park"	2019	—	—N/a	Non-album singles
"Brake"	2019	—	—N/a	Non-album singles
"Lord"	2019	—	—N/a	Non-album singles
"Orange Room"	2019	—	—N/a	Non-album singles
"Wednesday"	2020	—	—N/a	Non-album singles
"Take it all" feat. King Sushi	2020	—	—N/a	Non-album singles
Collaborations
"Rose of Sharon" (무궁화) with Mad Clown, Donutman, Boi B	2016	12	KOR: 244,242	Show Me the Money 5
"Going Home" (비행소년) with Mad Clown feat. Gummy	2016	6	KOR: 433,732	Show Me the Money 5
"—" denotes releases that did not chart.
