= Hangzoo =

South Korean rapper

- Born: 10 December 1986 (age 39); Incheon, South Korea
- Genre: Hip hop
- Occupation: Rapper
- Instrument: Vocals
- Years active: 2010–present
- Label: Amoeba Culture

Korean name
- Hangul: 윤형준
- RR: Yun Hyeongjun
- MR: Yun Hyŏngjun

Yoon Hyung-joon (Korean: 윤형준), better known by his stage name Hangzoo (행주), is a South Korean rapper and member of Rhythm Power. He was the winner of Show Me the Money 6. He released his first album, Best Driver, on 25 August 2015.

== Discography ==
=== Extended plays ===
Title	Album details	Peak chart positions	Sales
Title	Album details	KOR	Sales
Best Driver	Released: 25 August 2015; Label: Amoeba Culture, LOEN Entertainment; Formats: CD, digital download	—	—N/a
"—" denotes releases that did not chart or were not released in that region.

=== Singles ===
Title	Year	Peak chart positions	Sales (DL)	Album
Title	Year	KOR	Sales (DL)	Album
As lead artist
"Best Driver" feat. Gaeko	2015	—	—N/a	Best Driver
"Red Sun" feat. Zico, Swings	2017	3	KOR: 410,643	Show Me the Money 6
"Bestdriverz" feat. Dean, Zion.T	2017	56	KOR: 56,332	Show Me the Money 6
"Turn Around" (돌리고) feat. DJ Doc	2017	91	KOR: 40,954	Show Me the Money 6
Collaborations
"People These Days" (요즘것들) with Young B, Hash Swan, Killagramz feat. Zico, Dean	2017	5	KOR: 612,987	Show Me the Money 6
"Search" with Young B feat. Car, the Garden	2017	11	KOR: 240,175	Show Me the Money 6
"Cart" with Cho Mi-yeon of (G)I-dle	2019	—	—N/a	Code Share Project
"—" denotes releases that did not chart.
