= Killagramz =

South Korean rapper (born 1992)

- Killagramz in 2026

Background information
- Born: June 23, 1992 (age 34); Fullerton, California, United States
- Origin: Sunny Hills High School
- Genre: Hip hop
- Occupations: Rapper
- Instruments: Vocals
- Years active: 2016–present
- Label: Cycadelic Records

Kevin Joonhee Lee (Korean: 케빈 준희 리, born June 23, 1992), better known by his stage name Killagramz (킬라그램), is a South Korean-American rapper. He was a contestant on Show Me the Money 5 and Show Me the Money 6 . He released his first album, Faint, on June 10, 2017.

== Discography ==
=== Extended plays ===
Title	Album details	Peak chart positions	Sales
Title	Album details	KOR	Sales
Faint (좋아 죽어)	Released: June 10, 2017; Label: Cycadelic Records, Kiwi Media Group, LOEN Entertainment; Formats: CD, digital download	—	—N/a

=== Singles ===
Title	Year	Peak chart positions	Sales (DL)	Album
Title	Year	KOR	Sales (DL)	Album
As lead artist
"Birthday" feat. Kidkat	2016	—	—N/a	Non-album single
"Faint" (좋아 죽어 (기절해))	2017	—	—N/a	Faint
"Where" (어디) feat. Zico, Dean	2017	8	KOR: 265,774	Show Me the Money 6
"Dirty Dog"	2017	—	—N/a	Non-album single
"Coloring" (컬러링) feat. Hash Swan	2017	—	—N/a	Non-album single
Collaborations
"Black Out" feat. Kidkat	2016	—	—N/a	Non-album single
"People These Days" (요즘것들) with Young B, Hash Swan, Hangzoo feat. Zico, Dean	2017	5	KOR: 612,987	Show Me the Money 6
"—" denotes releases that did not chart.
