= Illionaire Records =

South Korean music label

- The logo of Illionaire Records
- Founded: 2011
- Founder: The Quiett, Dok2
- Defunct: 2020
- Distributors: CJ E&M, Genuine Music Inc.
- Genre: Hip hop
- Country of origin: South Korea
- Location: Seoul, South Korea
- Official website: http://www.illionaire.kr

Illionaire Records was an independent South Korean record label formed in January 2011 by rappers The Quiett and Dok2. The label also represents rapper Beenzino. Despite its small size, Illionaire Records was considered one of the most influential hip hop record labels in South Korea due to the popularity of its artists. As of 6 July 2020, Illionaire Records announced via their official social media accounts that they are now defunct.

== History ==
Friends and rappers The Quiett and Dok2 formed Illionaire Records on January 1, 2011. They signed rapper Beenzino later that year. The Quiett later said in an interview with Complex that he wanted to start a small label to avoid the traditional k-pop major label system. "On major labels, the money made by the artists is first given to the company to pay the bosses, managers, and staff members. In our case, we’re the bosses," he said. The label has only one employee and none of the three rappers are bound by contracts.

The label experienced a surge of popularity in its first few years due to Dok2's many collaborations with Korean-American singer and rapper Jay Park.

Illionaire Records toured Korea in the summer of 2012. On November 11, the three artists released the free track "Illionaire Gang" to coincide with their "Illionaire Day Concert."

In 2014, the label were the headliners for the "Asian Music Festival Summer Concert" in New York City on May 21. That summer the label also released a compilation album entitled "11:11."

Dok2 and The Quiett represented Illionaire Records on the third season of the TV rap competition show Show Me The Money, where they were the producers of winning contestant Bobby of IKON. They, being well known only under-ground initially, garnered more public recognition after they appeared on Show Me the Money.

On 6 February 2020, Illionaire Records announced via Instagram, founding member Dok2 and the label mutually agreed to terminate his contract. No official reason was given for the departure.

Illionaire Records announced on 6 July 2020 that they will close their record label via their official Instagram and Twitter account. They stated they will continue to support their artists in their future endeavours. No other reason was provided for their sudden departure.

== Subsidiary Projects ==
Dok2 and The Quiett formed a new label under Illionaire in September 2016. After announcing Ambition Musik, they introduced three rappers, Kim Hyo-eun, Changmo, Hash Swan, and later, Ash Island and Leellamarz through the official Ambition Musik Instagram account. For the first time, Dok2 and The Quiett didn't think to scout Changmo, Ash Island, and Hash Swan, so fans guessed that it would be Superbee and myunDo or Microdot, but it wasn't true. After establishing Ambition Musik, new members joined through Ambition Musik, not Illionaire.

== Influence on Korean Hip-Hop ==
Before Illionaire Records came out, showing off money to people was not ethically right in Korean culture. People used to think that rappers were always having trouble with earning money, and it was actually true as the first generation of Hip-Hop artists had trouble with earning money. However, Dok2 didn't care what other people say or think about him, so he showed him making tons of money with his rap music. Hip-hop used to be a music genre that not many people liked, but Illionaire Records has helped to lead the Hip-Hop culture to the mainstream from the underground.

== Concert Tour in the US ==
2016

- 07/21 - Chicago, IL – Concord Music Hall
- 07/22 - New York, NY – TERMINAL 5
- 07/23 - Atlanta, GA – Center Stage - The Loft - Vinyl
- 07/29 - Los Angeles, CA – The Wiltern

2017

- 11/30 - San Francisco, CA – Regency Grand Ballroom
- 12/02 - Los Angeles, CA – The Belasco Theater
- 12/03 - Seattle, WA – Neumos
- 12/08 - 'Atlanta, GA – Center Stage'
- 12/10 - New York, NY – Highline Ballroom

== Background of Korean Hip-hop culture ==
Towards the end of the Korean War, Korean people became more acceptable westernized culture. Especially, the biggest change was accepting Hip-hop culture. Since Korea had really conservative beliefs, it was hard to mingle with a culture that expresses freedom and criticizes society, like Hip-hop does. However, as people's thought has been changed, Hip-hop gained a lot of popularity. Dok2 is one of the pioneers of Hip-hop in Korea.

== Artists ==
- The Quiett
- Beenzino
- Dok2

=== Sub-labels ===
- Ambition Musik

== Awards ==
2020 10th Gaon Chart Music Awards Record Production of the Year - Changmo "Meteor" (for Ambition Musik)
