= Illson =

South Korean rapper (born 1982)

Illson 손창일
- Also known as: Double K
- Born: Son Chang-il; January 1, 1982 (age 44); South Korea
- Genres: Hip hop
- Occupation: Rapper
- Instrument: Vocals
- Years active: 2004–present
- Label: Green Wave G-Unit Records

Korean name
- Hangul: 손창일
- RR: Son Changil
- MR: Son Ch'angil

Son Chang-il (Korean: 손창일; born January 1, 1982), better known by his stage name Illson (stylized as ILLSON) and formerly as Double K (Korean: 더블 케이), is a South Korean rapper. He was the winning judge/producer on the first season of Show Me the Money before making a second appearance as a contestant in the sixth season. He released his first album, Positive Mind, on October 28, 2004.

== Discography ==
=== Studio albums ===
Title	Album details	Peak chart positions	Sales
Title	Album details	KOR	Sales
Positive Mind	Released: October 28, 2004; Formats: digital download	—	—N/a
Ink Music	Released: May 6, 2010; Label: KT Music; Formats: CD, digital download	2	—N/a
Green Wave (그린웨이브)	Released: April 23, 2017; Label: Green Wave, Feel Ghood Music, LOEN Entertainment; Formats: CD, digital download	—	—N/a

=== Special albums ===
Title	Album details	Peak chart positions	Sales
Title	Album details	KOR	Sales
Flow 2 Flow with Dok2	Released: January 25, 2011; Label: Hiphopplaya; Formats: digital download	—	—N/a
Analogue Part.2 (Livesystem) Live album	Released: December 15, 2017; Label: Green Wave, Warner Music Korea; Formats: CD, digital download	—	—N/a
Analogue Part.1 (Jazzed) Jazz ver. album	Released: December 22, 2017; Label: Green Wave, Warner Music Korea; Formats: CD, digital download	—	—N/a

=== Extended plays ===
Title	Album details	Peak chart positions	Sales
Title	Album details	KOR	Sales
Rap Movement (랩운동)	Released: April 9, 2013; Label: KO Sound, CJ E&M; Formats: CD, digital download	—	—N/a
Guy (놈)	Released: December 20, 2013; Label: KO Sound, CJ E&M; Formats: CD, digital download	25	KOR: 613

=== Charted singles ===
Title	Year	Peak chart positions	Sales (DL)	Album
Title	Year	KOR	Sales (DL)	Album
As lead artist
"Favorite Music" feat. Gil Hak-mi	2010	79	—N/a	Ink Music
"Ment" (멘트) feat. Gaeko	2012	26	KOR: 416,580	Non-album single
"Rap Movement" (랩운동)	2013	—	KOR: 27,217	Rap Movement
"Hot Pants"	2013	89	KOR: 58,992	Non-album singles
"Rewind" feat. Michelle Lee	2013	50	KOR: 110,332	Non-album singles
"Guy" (놈) feat. Jay Park	2013	55	KOR: 51,127	Guy
Collaborations
"Home" with Loco feat. Jinsil	2012	35	KOR: 140,391	Show Me the Money
"Brilliant Is..." with Skull, Haha, Geeks, Zico, Mad Clown, Swings, Zizo, Soul Dive, Heo Kyung-hwan, Kim Ji-min feat. Gill, Jungin	2013	75	—N/a	Non-album single
"—" denotes releases that did not chart.
