= Korean Hip-hop Awards =

South Korean music award

- Awarded for: Excellence in hip-hop and R&B
- Country: South Korea
- First award: 2017
- Website: koreanhiphopawards.com

The Korean Hip-hop Awards (KHA; Korean: 한국 힙합 어워즈) is an annual South Korean music awards ceremony. It was first held in 2017 and is hosted by the hip hop web magazines Hiphople and Hiphopplaya. The winners are decided by 70% critic vote and 30% netizen vote from 2023 (50% critic vote and 50% netizen vote previously).

== Winners and nominees ==
=== Artist of the Year ===
Year	Recipient	Nominees
2026	Sik-K	Effie; EK; Lil Moshpit; Justhis; Yumdda
2025	Sik-K	B-Free; Fleeky Bang; Kid Milli; QM; Yang Hong-won
2024	Beenzino	Lobonabeat; Leellamarz; Swings; Sik-K; Kid Milli
2023	Jay Park	Blase; Big Naughty; Unofficialboyy; Justhis; Zico
2022	Changmo	Jay Park; Ash Island; Unofficialboyy; Khundi Panda; Homies
2021	Jay Park	Swings; Justhis; Yumdda; Paloalto; Deepflow
2020	Yumdda	E Sens; Changmo; C Jamm; Giriboy; The Quiett
2019	The Quiett	Jay Park; Swings; Paloalto; Giriboy; Kid Milli
2018	Jay Park	Dok2; Zico; Sik-K; GroovyRoom; Rhythm Power
2017	Jay Park	Bewhy; Nucksal; Beenzino; Huckleberry P; Dean

=== New Artist of the Year ===
Year	Recipient	Nominees
2026	Effie	Molly Yam; Shinjihang; SYSTEM SEOUL; NOWIMYOUNG; Yoon Da Hye
2025	YULEUM	Ambid Jack; Nosun; O'KOYE; OSUN; Yang Kyle
2024	ShyboiiTobii	Ghvstclub; Ksmartboi; Street Baby; Xwally; Tray B
2023	gonggonggoo009	NSW Yoon; Roh Yun-ha; Damini; Polodared; Fleeky Bang
2022	Since	Kwon Kibaek; Mudd the Student; Be'O; Big Naughty; Oygli
2021	Homies	Wonstein; Swervy; Bibi; Jo Gwang-il; DeVita
2020	Ash Island	Mushvenom; Sogumm; Sokodomo; Lil Cherry & Jito Mo; Damye
2019	Haon	Coogie; Uneducated Kid; Jclef; Zene the Zilla; George
2018	DPR Live	Off On Off; Soma; Ku Won-chan; Yeseo; Jaedal
2017	Justhis	Changmo; Sik-K; Owen Ovadoz; Nafla; XXX

=== Hip Hop Album of the Year ===
Year	Recipient	Work	Nominees
2026	Sik-K & Lil Moshpit	K-FLIP+	B-Free - FREE THE MANE 3 “FREE THE MANE VS B-FREE"; Justhis - LIT; Effie - pullup to busan 4 morE hypEr summEr it's gonna bE a fuckin moviE; EK - YAHO; Yumdda - Breathe 4 (살아숨셔 4)
2025	B-Free & Hukky Shibaseki	Free Hukky Shibaseki & the God Sun Symphony Group : Odyssey.1	Zene the Zilla - 94-24; Fleeky Bang - AKUMA; EK - ESCAPE; The Quiett - Luxury Flow; QM - ANT (개미)
2024	Beenzino	Nowitzki	Lobonabeat - Trapstar Lifestyle; Skyminhyuk - Liberation (해방); AP Alchemy - AP Alchemy: Side A; E Sens - Piggy Bank (저금통); Kid Milli - Beige
2023	Lil Moshpit	AAA	009 - UU (ㅠㅠ); Nucksal & Cadejo - Sincerely Yours (당신께); C Jamm - Ghenn (걘); Lee Hyeon-jun - Lost in Translation (번역 중 손실); Paloalto - Dirt
2022	Changmo	Underground Rockstar	Los - Skandalouz; Unofficialboyy & Haifhaif - Net, Trap, Launcher, Capture (그물,덫,발사대기,포획); ChoiLB - Independent Music (독립음악); Kid Milli & Dress - Cliche; Fana - Fanatiic
2021	Bill Stax	Detox	Deepflow - Founder; H1ghr Music - H1ghr: Red Tape & H1ghr: Blue Tape; Nucksal - 1Q87; Khundi Panda - Garosawk (가로사옥); Don Malik - Malik the Cactus Flower (선인장화)
2020	C Jamm	Keung (킁)	E Sens - The Stranger (이방인); Changmo - Boyhood; XXX - Second Language; O'Domar - Field (밭); Futuristic Swaver - BFOTY
2019	XXX	Language	Justhis & Paloalto - 4 the Youth; The Quiett - Glow Forever; Kid Milli - Ai, the Playlist; Bassagong - Tang-A (탕아); Illinit - Cosmos
2018	Legit Goons	Junk Drunk Love	Dok2 - Reborn; Code Kunst - Muggles' Mansion; Fana - Fanaconda; Kim Ximya & Son Daehyeon - Moonshine; Chaboom - Sour
2017	Nucksal	The God of Small Things (작은 것들의 신)	Beenzino - 12; Hwaji - Zissou; Justhis - 2 Many Homes 4 1 Kid; Takeone - Green Ideology (녹색이념); B-Free - Free From Seoul

=== Hip Hop Track of the Year ===
Year	Recipient(s)	Work	Nominees
2026	Sik-K, Lil Moshpit	"LOV3" (feat. Bryan Chase, Okasian)	Molly Yam - "Burning slow"; Effie - "CAN I SIP 담배"; Yumdda - "Irony" (IE러니); EK - "Mollyworld"; Potty Monkey - "Because man" (남자니까)
2025	Haon	"BASTARD" (꼴통) (feat. Changmo)	B-Free & Hukky Shibaseki - "INDO"; Fleeky Bang - "My Name Is"; Changmo - "Pure Rage"; EK - "Survive"; Sik-K - "TRAP"
2024	E Sens	"What the Hell"	Dynamic Duo, Lee Young-ji - "Smoke"; Lobonabeat - "Young Boy"; Beenzino - "Travel Again" (여행 Again); Swings, Nochang, Black Nut, Damini - "No One Likes Us"; Kid Milli - "25"
2023	Zico	"New Thing" (새삥)	Lobonabeat - "Birthday" (생일); Lil Moshpit - "Yooooo"; Lee Hyeon-jun - "White Lighter"; Keith Ape - "Mull"; Paloalto - "Priceless"
2022	Changmo	"Taiji" (태지)	Be'O - "Counting Stars"; Sokodomo - "Merry-Go-Round" (회전목마); Ash Island - "Melody" (멜로디); Unofficialboyy & Haifhaif - "Net, Trap, Launcher, Capture" (그물,덫,발사대기,포획); Changmo - "Hyperstar"
2021	Mirani, Munchman, Khundi Panda, Mushvenom	"VVS"	The Quiett - "Bentley 2"; Zico - "Any Song" (아무노래); Nucksal - "Akira"; H1ghr Music - "The Purge"; Jo Gwang-il - "Acrobat" (곡예사)
2020	Changmo	"Meteor"	Yumdda - "Don't Call Me" (돈 Call Me); Mushvenom - "Why Are You So Noisy" (왜 이리 시끄러운 것이냐); Bewhy - "Gottasadae" (가라사대); Changmo, Hash Swan, Ash Island, Kim Hyoeun - "Band"; C Jamm - "Poker Face" (포커페이스)
2019	Justhis, Kid Milli, Noel, Young B	"IndiGO"	Mommy Son - "Mommy Jump" (소년점프); XXX - "Sujak" (수작); Giriboy, Kid Milli, Noel, Swings - "Flex"; pH-1, Kid Milli, Loopy - "Good Day"; Jvcki Wai - "Enchanted Propaganda"
2018	Woo Won-jae	"We Are" (시차)	Jazzyfact - "Harujongil" (하루종일); Dok2 & Jay Park - "Most Hated" (니가 싫어하는 노래); Kim Ximya - "Career High"; Chaboom - "Lord of the Flies" (리빠똥); TFO - "Cone" (원뿔)
2017	Bewhy	"Forever"	Nucksal - "NFS" (팔지 않아); Nafla - "Mercy"; Owen Ovadoz - "City"; Jay Park & Ugly Duck - "Ain't No Party Like an AOMG Party" (우리가 빠지면 PARTY가 아니지); Beenzino - "Flexin"

=== R&B Album of the Year ===
Year	Recipient	Work	Nominees
2026	Crush	FANG	Bibi - EVE: ROMANCE; Shinjihang - NONG; Jinbo the SuperFreak - Jbfm; Wonstein - TENT; Yoon Da Hye - WANG (개미의 왕)
2025	Sumin & Slom	Miniseries 2	Rad Museum - HOME SICK; Jinbo The SuperFreak, Hersh, PoPoMo - PoPoMo; Jooyoung - Sphere; Jay Park - The One You Wanted; Sole - Time Machine
2024	Jerd	Bomm	Thama - Wooof; Sumin - Sichimi (시치미); Youra - A Lot of Tentacles (꽤 많은 수의 촉수 돌기); Zion.T - Zip; Crush - Wonderego
2023	Rad Museum	Rad	DPR Ian - Moodswings in to Order; Babylon - Ego 90's; Bibi - Lowlife Princess: Noir; Big Naughty - Nangman (낭만); A.Train - Private Pink
2022	Thama	Don't Die Colors	DPR Ian - Moodswings in This Order; Mind Combined - Circle; Sumin & Slom - Miniseries; Lee Hi - 4 Only; Jerd - A.M.P.
2021	Samuel Seo	Unity II	Crush - With Her; Baek Ye-rin - Tellusboutyourself; Sumin - XX, DeVita - Creme; Jeebanoff - Good Thing. [remix]
2020	Crush	From Midnight to Sunrise	Samuel Seo - The Misfit; Hippy Was Gipsy - Fire (불); Dress & Sogumm - Not My Fault; Baek Ye-rin - Every Letter I Sent You; Sogumm - Sobrightttttttt
2019	Sumin	Your Home	Colde - Wave; Naul - Sound Doctrine; Jclef - Flaw, Flaw; Hippy Was Gipsy - Language (언어); Horim - Metrocity
2018	Hippy Was Gipsy	Tree (나무)	Rico - White Light Panorama; Off On Off - Boy; Rad Museum - Scene; Xin Seha - 7F, the Void; Vinicius - Sai (사이)
2017	Jay Park	Everything You Wanted	Dean - 130 mood: TRBL; Samuel Seo - Ego Expand; Hoody - On And On; Nahzam Sue - Till The Sun Goes Up; Crush - Interlude

=== R&B Track of the Year ===
Year	Recipient	Work	Nominees
2026	Crush	"UP ALL NITE" (feat. Sumin)	Dimo Rex - "ON THE TABLE" (feat. Sik-K); Jeebanoff - "Misery"; Shinjihang - "LEAVING THE VALLEY" (골짜기); Yoon Da Hye - "twin flame" (그녀는 손가락 금붕어); Bibi - "Apocalypse" (종말의 사과나무)
2025	Tabber	"Chi-Ka" (feat. Dean)	Dean - "NASA"; Rad Museum, Kid Milli - "S/S"; Jay Park - "Taxi Blurr"; Sole - "Still Love" (그럼에도 LOVE); Sumin & Slom - "Why, Why, Why" (왜, 왜, 왜)
2024	Dean	"Die 4 You"	Rad Museum - "Call Me Back"; Sumin - "Closet" (옷장); Jerd - "Like Rain, Like Music" (비처럼 음악처럼); Jemini - "Attention"; Crush - "Ego" (미워)
2023	Crush	"Rush Hour"	DPR Ian - "Ballroom Extravaganza"; Rad Museum - "Offline"; Jay Park - "Ganadara"; Big Naughty - "Beyond Love" (정이라고 하자); Slom - "Anirago" (아니라고)
2022	Lee Hi	"Only"	Thama - "Blessed"; Mind Combined - "Show Me"; Sumin & Slom - "The Gonlan Song" (곤란한 노래); Youra - "Mimi"; Thama - "I'm Chill" (Chill이란 낱말의 존재이유)
2021	Lee Hi	"Holo" (홀로)	Crush - "Ohio"; Chancellor - "Automatic Remix"; DeVita - "Evita!"; Bibi - "Kazino" (사장님 도박은 재미로 하셔야 합니다); Samuel Seo - "Cycle" (굴레)
2020	Dean	"Howlin' 404"	Samuel Seo - "Playaplayaplaya"; Colde - "Wa-r-r" (와르르♥); Jclef - "Mama, See"; Dress & Sogumm - "I Wonder" (궁금해); Sumin - "Shaker"
2019	Dean	"Instagram"	Sumin - "Your Home" (너네 집); George - "Gohaegoback" (하려고해고백); Jclef - "The Last 1 Hour Before We Fade" (지구 멸망 한 시간 전); Horim - "Sug4r"; Soma - "Pollen Allergy" (꽃가루)
2018	Off On Off	"Gold"	Jay Park - "Yacht (k)"; Samuel Seo - "Off You"; Hippy Was Gipsy - "Dot" (점); Peejay - "Na B Ya" (나비야); Rico - "Paradise"
2017	Dean	"D (half moon)"	Jay Park - "All I Wanna Do"; Crush - "Woo Ah" (우아해); Jeebanoff - "Sungbook-gu Kids" (삼선동 사거리); Minje - "Do"; Hoody - "Need U"

=== Producer of the Year ===
Year	Recipient	Nominees
2026	Lil Moshpit	Hukky Shibaseki; kimj; My Homie Tar; UGP; vangdale
2025	vangdale	Fisherman; Fredi Casso; Hukky Shibaseki; Ian Ka$h; Slom
2024	Fredi Casso	Nochang; Code Kunst; Hukky Shibaseki; Hecop; Hyeminsong
2023	250	Lil Moshpit; Slom; Jay Kidman; Toil; Fredi Casso
2022	Toil	Gray; Viann; Slom; Code Kunst; Haifhaif
2021	Code Kunst	GroovyRoom; Giriboy; Toil; Bronze; Goosebumps
2020	Giriboy	Frnk; Jay Kidman; Goosebumps; Dress; GXXD
2019	Giriboy	Code Kunst; Gray; Frnk; GroovyRoom; Woogie
2018	GroovyRoom	Code Kunst; Gray; Peejay; Jflow; Kim Park Chella
2017	GroovyRoom	Cha Cha Malone; Gray; TK; Humbert; Cokejazz

=== Collaboration of the Year ===
Year	Recipients	Work	Nominees
2026	Sik-K, Lil Moshpit (feat. Bryan Chase, Okasian)	"LOV3"	Molly Yam (feat. Sik-K, GGM LIL DRAGON) - "Burning slow (Remix)"; Loco (feat. TAICHU, Young Coco) - "Matcha High"; 1ANDON, Lil Moshpit, Yun Seok-cheol (feat. YULEUM) - "MY MAN (Remix)"; Big Naughty (feat. Lee Chan-hyuk) - "MUSIC"; Mushvenom (feat. Dr.Lee) - "Spin the wheel" (돌림판)
2025	GrovyRoom, pH-1, Haon, Trade L, Woodie Gochild, Big Naughty, Sik-K, Jay Park, lIlBOI	"FASHO"	Crucial Star - "368-11"; Changmo, Lobonabeat, Shyboiitobii, Dok2, SMUGGLERS - "No Tomorrow"; Dbo (feat. Dok2, Okasian) - "Pop it Up"; Rad Museum, Kid Milli (feat. Dean) - "S/S"; Jay Park (feat. Jessi, Awich, MILLI, Ramengvrl, Lil Cherry, Mirani, Maliibu Miitch, CAMO) - "Xtra McNasty"
2024	Oygli (feat. E Sens, Beenzino)	"1 to 8 Remix"	Lobonabeat, Bill Stax, Oygli - "I Need"; Leellamarz, NSW Yoon, Street Baby (feat. Haon, Sik-K) - "Money Dance"; Blase, Black Nut, Jimmy Paige, Dok2, Smugglers - "Grrr"; Swings, Nochang, Black Nut, Damini - "No One Likes Us"; E Sens (feat. Dok2) - "No Boss'
2023	Balming Tiger (feat. RM)	"Sexy Nukim" (섹시느낌)	Nucksal & Cadejo - "Sincerely Yours" (당신께); Lil Moshpit (feat. Kid Milli, Sokodomo, Polodared) - "Yooooo"; Blase (Note: feat. Don Mills, Ahn Byeong-woong, San E, Chillin Homie, Oygli, Big Naughty, Oceanfromtheblue, Trade L, Punchnello, A-Chess, Khakii, Polodared, Dive, Kimo L) - "Peace Out (Mega Mix)"; Justhis (feat. Kwaii, Don Malik, 009) - "Do Not Go Gentle into That Good Night"; Justhis, R.Tee, Don Malik, Huh, Khan, Mckdaddy, Los - "My Way"
2022	Homies (feat. Uneducated Kid, Paul Blanco)	"Siren Remix" (사이렌 Remix)	Jay Park, pH-1, Woogie, YLN Foreign (Note: with D.Ark, 365lit, Lil Boi, Lee Young-ji, Ourealgoat, Choo and Osun) - "DNA Remix"; Basick (Note: featuring 365lit, Changmo, Crown J, Don Mills, Fana, Gaeko, Layone, Lil Boi, Myundo, Paul Blanco, San E, Swings, Skinny Brown, Verbal Jint and Yumdda) - "08Basick Remix" (08베이식 REMIX); Kitsyojii (Note: featuring Blase, Chamane, Mckdaddy, Dsel, Layone, Posadic, Kaogaii and Skyminhyuk) - "Stand Up Remix" (일어나 Remix); Toil (Note: featuring Yumdda, Changmo, Northfacegawd and Don Mills) - "Forever You Remix" (너 포에버 Remix); Heartcore - "Heartcore"
2021	Jvcki Wai, Coogie, Paloalto, The Quiett, Bassagong	"Fadeaway"	Changmo (Note: featuring 365lit, Zene the Zilla, Chamane, Paul Blanco, Damndef, Kim Hyoeun and Northfacegawd) - "Swoosh Flow Remix"; Mirani, Munchman, Khundi Panda, Mushvenom (feat. Justhis) - "VVS"; The Quiett (feat. Yumdda) - "Bentley 2"; Chancellor (Note: with Jay Park, Lee Hi, Bibi, Jamie, Moon, Bumkey, Samuel Seo, Suran, Babylon, Hoody, Sumin, Mrshll, Ann One, Elo, Twlv, Oceanfromtheblue, Jiselle, Sole, Thama, Kvsh, Jinbo, Jerd, Soovi, B.E.D., Xydo, Owell Mood, None) - "Automatic Remix"; Jo Gwang-il (Note: featuring Basick, P-Type, Skull, Sikboy, Olltii, Minos, Brown Tigger and Jazzmal) - "Acrobat Remix" (곡예사 Remix)
2020	Yumdda, Deepflow, The Quiett, Paloalto, Simon Dominic (Note: featuring Woo Won-jae, Kim Hyoeun, Nucksal and Huckleberry P)	"I'mma Do" (아마두)	Lil Boi, Takeone, Don Malik, Justhis - "Bad News Cypher vol.1 (vv2 remix)"; Simon Dominic (featuring Moon, Woo Won-jae and Jvcki Wai) - "GOTT"; Various Artists (Note: Jay Park, Simon Dominic, Loco, Ugly Duck, Woo Won-jae, Sik-K, Woodie Gochild, Haon, Gaeko, Bewhy, Paloalto, G2, Reddy, Sway D, Owen, The Quiett, Changmo, Hash Swan, Kim Hyo-eun, Deepflow, Nucksal, Odee, Rocky L, EK, Los, Chaboom, Swings, Giriboy, NO:EL, Jvcki Wai, Justhis, Han Yo-han, Yunhway, Jhnovr, Coogie, Punchnello, Penomeco, Dbo, Hangzoo, Geegooin, Boi B, Ja Mezz, Dayday, Junoflo, Flowsik, Killagramz, Yumdda, Uneducated Kid, Myundo, Takeone, Gray) - "119 Remix"; Changmo, Hash Swan, Kim Hyoeun, Ash Island - "Band"; Balming Tiger - "Armadillo"
2019	Justhis, Kid Milli, Noel, Young B	"IndiGO"	Bassagong (feat. JTong) - "Tang-A" (탕아); Drunken Tiger (feat. MC Meta, Dok2) - "A Tiger Named JK" (이름만 대면); pH-1, Kid Milli, Loopy (feat. Paloalto) - "Good Day"; Sumin (feat. Xin Seha) - "Your Home" (너네 집); Giriboy, Kid Milli, Noel, Swings - "Flex"
2018	Samuel Seo & Qim Isle	"Mango"	GroovyRoom (Note: featuring Loopy, Masta Wu, Kim Hyoeun and Sik-K) - "Xindoshi"; Nucksal, Hanhae, Ryno, Jo Woo-chan - "1/N" (N분의 1); Chaboom (featuring Paloalto, Swings and Deepflow) - "Equus" (에쿠스); Somdef (Note: featuring Verbal Jint, Paloalto, DPR Live and Car the Garden) - "Ring Ring Ring"; Hippy Was Gipsy (feat. Kim Oki) - "Fall" (지네)
2017	DPR Live, Sik-K, Punchnello, Owen, Flowsik	"Eung Freestyle" (응 프리스타일)	Beenzino (feat. YDG) - "January"; Okasian (featuring G-Dragon, Bewhy, CL) - "\1,000,000"; Zico (feat. Crush, Dean) - "Bermuda Triangle"; Kirin & Jay Park - "City Breeze"; Heize (feat. Dean, DJ Friz) - "And July"

=== Underrated Album of the Year ===
Year	Recipient(s)	Work	Nominees
2021	QM	Money Breath (돈숨)	Jay Park & DJ Wegun - Everybody Sucks; JJK - The Angel Wakes Hell's Morning (지옥의 아침은 천사가 깨운다); Homies - Ghetto Kids; Fisherman - The Dragon Warrior; Samuel Seo - Dial
2020	OLNL	Cyber Lover	O'Domar - Field (밭); Errday - Sara (살아); Viann - The Baker; Chaboom - Sweets & Bitters; Lee Hyeon-jun - Main Stream
2019	Odee & Viann	Open Monday	Jaedal - Period; Lee Suho - Entertain; Jjangyou - KOKI7; Mild Beats - Secondhand Smoking; Moldy - Internet Kid
2018	TFO	BB (ㅂㅂ)	Donutman - Rainbow; Cream Villa - Creamtopia; Ku Won-chan & Fisherman - Format; Xin Seha - 7F, the Void; Sleeq & Don Malik - Fommy Hiltiger
2017	Sleeq	Colossus	Yumdda - Breathe (살아숨셔); Jayho - Lemans (르망); Jeebanoff - So Fed Up; Sumin - Beat, And Go To Sleep; Legit Goons - Camp

=== Music Video of the Year ===
Year	Recipient	Work	Nominees
2026	EK	Mollyworld	NOWIMYOUNG - "AH AH" (feat. Sik-K); Sik-K, Lil Moshpit - "LALALA (Snitch Club)"; Loco - "Matcha High" (feat. TAICHU, Young Coco); Yumdda - "The Quiett" (더콰이엇); Mushvenom - "Spin the wheel" (돌림판) (feat. Dr.Lee)
2025	Sik-K, Haon	"KC (BUST IT DOWN)"	GrovyRoom, pH-1, Haon, Trade L, Woodie Gochild, Big Naughty, Sik-K, Jay Park, lIlBOI - "FASHO"; B-Free, Hukky Shibaseki - "INDO"; Camo - "K-PACK"; Fleeky Bang - "My Name Is" (feat. Tray B); Dean - "NASA" (feat. FKJ)
2024	DPR Ian	"Don't Go Insane"	Lobonabeat, Bill Stax, Oygli - "I Need"; Swings, Nochang, Black Nut, Damini - "No One Likes Us"; Skyminhyuk - "Liberation" (해방); Sik-K - "See You in Every Party"; Zion.T - "Stranger" (모르는 사람)
2023	Balming Tiger	"Sexy Nukim" (섹시느낌)	DPR Ian - "Miito Movie (Part 1)"; Lobonabeat - "Birthday" (생일); Blase - "Pop It"; Jvcki Wai - "Go Back"; JTong - "Chosun Savage" (조선 세비지)
2022	Changmo	"Taiji" (태지)	250 - "Bang Bus"; DPR Live - "Summer Tights"; Jay Park, pH-1, Woogie, YLN Foreign - "DNA Remix"; Sokodomo - "MM"; Jerd - All My Persona Short Film
2021	H1ghr Music	"The Purge"	DPR Live - "Legacy"; Jvcki Wai, Coogie, Paloalto, The Quiett, Bassagong - "Fadeaway"; Homies - "Siren" (사이렌); DPR Live - "Kiss Me + Neon"; The Quiett - "Bentley 2"
2020	Balming Tiger	"Armadillo"	Bewhy - "Gottasadae" (가라사대); E Sens - "Son of a" (그XX아들같이); Dynamic Duo - "MSG" (맵고짜고단거); Ash Island - "Paranoid"; Changmo - "Meteor"
2019	Mommy Son	"Mommy Jump" (소년점프)	Bassagong - "Rodeo" (로데오); Giriboy, Kid Milli, Noel, Swings - "Flex"; Jaedal - "Tree"; Balming Tiger - "I'm Sick"; Sultan of the Disco - "Tong Bei Quan" (통배권)

=== Label of the Year ===
Year	Recipient	Nominees
2026	KC	AP Alchemy; At Area; Daytona Entertainment; Dirty Play Records; Standard Friends
2025	KC	Ambition Musik; Dirty Play Records; Nazca Records; Standard Friends; you.will.knovv
2024	AP Alchemy	KC; Skrr Gang Business; Amoeba Culture; Ambition Musik; At Area
2023	VMC	AOMG; New Wave Records; Daytona Entertainment; Yng & Rich Records; H1ghr Music
2022	Dejavu Group	AOMG; Daytona Entertainment; Ambition Musik; Yng & Rich Records; H1ghr Music
2021	H1ghr Music	VMC; Hi-Lite Records; AOMG; Ambition Musik; 8 Ball Town
2020	Ambition Musik	BANA; AOMG; H1ghr Music; Legit Goons; WYBH
2019	Indigo Music	AOMG; H1ghr Music; Mkitrain Records; Hi-Lite Records; WYBH

=== Artists with multiple awards ===
Awards	Artist
8	Sik-K
6	Jay Park
5	Changmo
5	Lil Moshpit
4	Crush
4	Dean
4	Haon
3	Balming Tiger
3	Beenzino
3	GroovyRoom
3	Justhis
3	The Quiett
2	DPR Live
2	E Sens
2	Giriboy
2	Homies
2	Kid Milli
2	Lee Hi
2	NO:EL
2	Paloalto
2	Samuel Seo
2	Sumin
2	Yang Hong-won
2	Yumdda
