= 119 (Show Me the Money song) =

2018 song by Nafla, pH-1, Kid Milli, OLNL, Loopy & Superbee

"119" is a song by South Korean rappers Nafla, pH-1, Kid Milli, OLNL, Loopy, and Superbee. It was released on October 27, 2018 as the fifth single from the Show Me the Money 777 Episode 4 album.

== Charts ==
Chart (2018)	Peak position
South Korea (Gaon)	46

== Remix ==
"119 Remix"

Remix by Various Artists
- Language: Korean
- Released: December 2, 2018
- Genre: Hip-hop
- Length: 20:39
- Label: AOMG
- Songwriters: Jay Park, Simon Dominic, Loco, Ugly Duck, Woo, Sik-K, Woodie Gochild, Haon, Gaeko, Bewhy, Paloalto, G2, Reddy, Sway D, Owen, The Quiett, Changmo, Hash Swan, Kim Hyo-eun, Deepflow, Nucksal, Odee, Rocky L, EK, Los, Chaboom, Swings, Giriboy, NO:EL, Jvcki Wai, Justhis, Han Yo-han, Yunhway, Jhnovr, Coogie, Punchnello, Penomeco, Dbo, Hangzoo, Geegooin, Boi B, Ja Mezz, Dayday, Junoflo, Flowsik, Killagramz, Yumdda, Uneducated Kid, Myundo, Takeone, Gray
- Producer: Gray

"119 Remix" (stylized as 119 REMIX) is the remix of "119" by South Korean rappers Jay Park, Simon Dominic, Loco, Ugly Duck, Woo, Sik-K, Woodie Gochild, Haon, Gaeko, Bewhy, Paloalto, G2, Reddy, Sway D, Owen, The Quiett, Changmo, Hash Swan, Kim Hyo-eun, Deepflow, Nucksal, Odee, Rocky L, EK, Los, Chaboom, Swings, Giriboy, NO:EL, Jvcki Wai, Justhis, Han Yo-han, Yunhway, Jhnovr, Coogie, Punchnello, Penomeco, Dbo, Hangzoo, Geegooin, Boi B, Ja Mezz, Dayday, Junoflo, Flowsik, Killagramz, Yumdda, Uneducated Kid, Myundo, Takeone, and Gray. It was released on December 2, 2018 by AOMG. At the time of its release, it was the longest South Korean hip-hop song with the most participants.

=== 119 Project ===
On its release day, AOMG announced that the profits made from "119 Remix" will be donated to organizations related to firefighting and fire accidents. In September 2019, Gray donated the song revenue (25 million won) to Seoul Metropolitan Fire & Disaster Headquarters on behalf of the artists who participated in the song.

=== Critical reception ===
"119 Remix" was nominated for collaboration of the year at the Korean Hip-hop Awards. According to netizens, it "proved that Korean hip-hop can unite" and "showed the positive side of hip-hop." One netizen claimed that he/she had not heard a remix that is better than the original one, but this song broke his/her prejudice.
