= Show Me the Money 11 =

Eleventh season of South Korean rap competition TV show

- Season 11
- Hosted by: Kim Jin-pyo; DJ Hyunhee (Resident DJ)
- Judges: Team Lil Boi x GroovyROom; Lil Boi; GroovyRoom; Team Jay Park x Slom; Jay Park; Slom; Team The Quiett x Leellamarz; The Quiett; Leellamarz; Team R. Tee x Justhis: R. Tee; Justhis
- Winner: Lee Young-ji
- Runners-up: Huh (1st runner-up); Blase (2nd runner-up); Don Malik (3rd runner-up)

Release
- Original network: Mnet
- Original release: October 21 – December 30, 2022 (Note: Due to the Seoul Halloween crowd crush that occurred on October 29, 2022, episode 3 was aired a week later than scheduled.)

Season chronology
- ← Previous; Show Me the Money 10 Next → Show Me the Money 12

The eleventh season of the series Show Me the Money (known as Show Me the Money 11: The New One) premiered on October 21, 2022. It aired every Friday at 23:00 (KST) on Mnet. The season featured four new producer teams in Lil Boi & GroovyRoom, Jay Park & Slom, The Quiett & Leellamarz, and Justhis & R. Tee.

Auditions in South Korea were held from July 1 to 30, 2022. There are also auditions held in Los Angeles, the United States, on August 13 and 14 of the same year, with Jay Park and Justhis as the judges for this particular audition. This marked the show's first auditions in the United States after 5 years when it was done for Season 6. The season saw about more than 30,000 applicants, the highest number throughout the series.

Lee Young-ji is announced as the winner of the season, with Jay Park & Slom being the winning team. She will receive ₩100,000,000 in prize money, plus first class air ticket and accommodation stay in Beverly Hills, worth ₩100,000,000 in total. Lee also became the first female contestant and former High School Rapper winner to win the series.

== Judges ==
Team Lil Boi x GroovyRoom

- Lil Boi: Rapper and former CEO, under his own label Halftime Records, and is one half of the rap duo Geeks. Previously, as a contestant, he participated in Season 4, and in Season 9 where he was crowned the winner of the season.
- GroovyRoom: Producer duo composed of Park Gyu-jeong and Lee Hwi-min. Founder of their own label AREA and is also currently signed under H1ghr Music. Previously participated in Season 9 as part of Team GroovyRoom x Justhis.

Team Jay Park x Slom

- Jay Park: Rapper, singer, and current CEO of More Vision. Also a former CEO of AOMG and H1ghr Music. Previously participated in Seasons 4 and 6 as producer for Team AOMG
- Slom: Producer who is currently signed under Zion.T's label Standard Friends. Member of HOLOCOIN. Previously participated in Season 10 as a producer under Team Tsla.

Team The Quiett x Leellamarz

- The Quiett: CEO and rapper currently signed under Daytona Records. Also a former CEO of the defunct Illionaire Records. Previously participated in Seasons 3 (where he was the winning producer for Team Illionaire), 5 and 7 (as member of Team Illionaire Ambition).
- Leellamarz: Rapper currently signed under Ambition Musik. Previously participated in season 5 as a contestant.

Team R. Tee x Justhis

- R. Tee: Producer currently signed under The Black Label.
- Justhis: Rapper currently signed under GROOVL1N. Previously participated in season 9 as a producer under Team GroovyRoom x Justhis.

== Teams ==
The Producer Team line-ups were formed during the 60-Second Team Rapper Casting round, in which eleven members per team were selected.

Team Jay Park x Slom (also known as Slay)

- Lee Young-ji – Winner of High School Rapper 3. Previously took part in Good Girl.
- Jambino – Signed under 8BallTown. Previously participated in season 9 as a member of Team CodePalo.
- Toigo – Member of Under Seongsu Bridge (USB) crew. Previously participated in seasons 9 and 10.
- Xinsayne – Signed under Doubleduvett. Previously participated in season 10 under his real name Shin Yong-joon.
- J'Kyun – Former member of Lucky J. Previously participated in seasons 2, 5 and 6 as J'Kyun and season 8 and 9 as the masked rapper Cox Billy.
- Park Myung-hoon – Known as Kambo. Signed under GBG. Previously participated in Drop The Bit.
- Takewon – Signed under Halftime Records. Previously participated in season 1.
- Justin Park – Korean-American rapper. Signed under 5A Label.
- Koo Bon-gyeom – Known as RB Nine. Member of Mighty Lynx crew.
- Yanu – Formerly signed under Halftime Records. Previously participated in seasons 8, 9 and 10.
- Hoongyo – N/A

Team R. Tee x Justhis (also known as R. Jus)

- Huh – Signed under Amoeba Culture. Previously participated in seasons 8 and 9 as Rose de Penny (Heo Sung-hyun).
- Don Malik – Signed under Ambition Musik. Member of Doppelgängem crew.
- Khan – Member of NFL crew. Previously participated in season 9 and Drop The Bit.
- Los – Korean-American rapper. Signed under VMC. Previously participated in seasons 6 and 7.
- Mckdaddy – Member of Vagabonds Tribe. Previously participated in seasons 7, 8 and 9.
- Unofficialboyy – Member of D.O.G crew. Previously participated in seasons 4, 5, 7, 8 and 10, and High School Rapper.
- Lee Seo-jin – Known as Dam1noise. Signed under Navyl1ne.
- Jo Chae-hyun – N/A
- Neuns – N/A
- Rolldice – Korean-American rapper.
- Lee Seul-yi – Known as 2Da.

Team The Quiett x Leellamarz (also known as Quiolin)

- NSW Yoon – Signed under Talented.
- QM – Signed under VMC.
- Crucial Star – Signed under his own label Starry Nightt Music. Previously participated in seasons 4 and 9.
- Damini – Rookie rapper. Signed under Minefield.
- Kim Jae-wook – N/A
- Kim Do-yoon – N/A
- Song Jin-woo – N/A
- Woolenciah – N/A
- Max Kim – Previously participated in Drop The Bit.
- Street Baby – Previously participated in season 9 under his real name Lee Gi-wook. Formerly known as xscapeway or XS.
- J4 Prada – Independent rookie rapper.

Team Lil Boi x GroovyRoom (also known as Grillz)

- Blase – Previously participated in seasons 7, 8, 9 and 10.
- Roh Yun-ha – Signed under Mine Field. Previously participated in High School Rapper 4 (1st runner up) and Drop The Bit (Winner).
- Chillin Homie – Signed under Mine Field. Member of NFL crew. Previously participated in seasons 7, 8 and 9.
- Fleeky Bang – Signed under Yellin Records.
- Polodared – Previously participated in season 10 under his real name Choi Sang-hyun, and Drop The Bit.
- Kitsyojii – Signed under LBNC. Previously participated in seasons 8, 9 and 10.
- YLN Foreign – Signed under Uncutpoint. Previously participated in High School Rapper 4 and Drop The Bit.
- Goneisback – N/A
- Digital Dav – Korean-American rapper. Signed under Xyber Studios.
- Lee Jun-seo – N/A
- Cho Terry – Previously participated in season 10. Also known as Shyboiitobii.

== Rounds ==
=== Round One: Rapper Selection Round ===
For the Korea audition, this season marked the return of the stadium auditions, where contestants will register at the venue and take part in Round One on the same day. As a safety precaution from the COVID-19 pandemic, the contestants will be divided into small groups, with each contestant socially distanced from one another, and have a plexiglass placed between him/her and the assigned producer. Each contestant will perform a short a cappella rap in front of the producer. The producer then provide an in-depth evaluation of the contestant, and determine if they advanced to the next round. Similar to the previous two seasons, the contestant will grab the chain at the corner of the plexiglass if he/she passes the round.

A total of 108 contestants, including 5 from the Los Angeles audition, moved on to Round Two.

Contestants from the Rapper Selection Round

Producer judge	Passed selection round	Failed selection round
Lil Boi	Chillin Homie, Takewon, Cho Terry, Cho Eun-gi, Won Dong-ha	J1no, Woo Hee-won, Veni, Poy, Ji Chanel
Park Gyu-jeong (GroovyRoom)	Goneisback, Polodared	—
Lee Hwi-min (GroovyRoom)	Fleeky Bang, Kim Nongmill, Steepy, Moon Kang-bin	Pullik, K$AP Rama, Poison Mushroom, Park Jae-woo, Green
Jay Park	Lee Young-ji, Choi Jin-hyuk, Hoongyo, Lee Chan-hee, Justin Park	Thunder, JDG
Slom	Kim Min-seok	Chait
The Quiett	Roh Yun-ha, Blase, QM	Rapper Sunken, Heroincity, Leedacity
Leellamarz	Damini, Sleepy, NSW Yoon, Kim Seung-min, Yanu, Kim Do-yoon, Woolenciah, Vekoel, Kim Jae-wook	Ddotty, D.Action, Tangtheawesome, Lil Hodong, Yooryeong, James An, Kim Dan
Justhis	Park Myung-hoon, J'Kyun, Don Malik, Lil 9ap, Sikboy, Digital Dav, Rolldice	Skyminhyuk, ODD Comedy, Jeon Hyun-jae, Takuwa, Ksmartboi, Shin Jung-min
R. Tee	Huh, IndEgo Aid, Unofficialboyy, Kitsyojii	Lee Su-jeong, Jiho Givenchy, Bruno Champman, D1PX0NKh, YunB, Son Simba, Ja Mezz, Brown Tigger
Other Contestants	Los, Mckdaddy, Yonge Jaundice, Youngboy Shui, Toigo, Shin Jae-hyuk, Ray Hill, Lee Jun-seo, Crucial Star, Xinsayne, Unofficialboyy, Neuns, Street Baby, Eric Young, Jambino, Khan, YLN Foreign, Kim Do-yoon, Jo Chae-hyun, Lee Seul-yi, Lee Seo-jin, Song Jin-woo, Max Kim	Niihard, Mc Rap, Greengrim, Mac Kidd, Cherry Boy 17, Yumewanaii, You Da-yeon, Cho Yong-han, Kim Min-jae, Noahjooda, Boo Hyun-seok, Na Sang-wook, Walovaycay, Nam Joon-hyuk, Bustabomb, Doctor Baek, Choi Gogi, IanBTC

=== Round Two: 60-second Team Rapper Casting ===
This round would be done in two parts. For the first part, the 108 contestants who moved on from Round One will each have to do a one minute rap in front of all judges. If all four producer teams failed the contestant, the beat stops and the contestant is eliminated from the show. Contestants who received at least one pass can proceed for Team Casting, where he/she chooses one of the team(s) that had passed him/her. However, during the Team Casting, the producer teams can eliminate contestants, such that each producer team would have only 11 contestants. After this round, 44 contestants moved on to Round Three, with 11 contestants in each producer team.

Contestants at the 60-Second Beat Rap

Beat	Rapper	Team Jay Park x Slom	Team Justhis x R. Tee	Team The Quiett x Leellamarz	Team Lil Boi x GroovyRoom	Team Pick
NSW Yoon (ft. Khan, Hangzoo) – Tech Fleece Freestyle	NSW Yoon	Pass	Pass	Pass	Pass	Team The Quiett x Leellamarz
	IndEgo Aid	Fail	Fail	Fail	Fail	—N/a
It will be released in 60 seconds (60추 후에 공개됩니다) (Prod. Raudi)	Kitsyojii	Pass	Fail	Fail	Pass	Team Lil Boi x GroovyRoom
Morality (도덕) (Prod. QM Lee)	Woolenciah	Pass	Pass	Pass	Fail	Team The Quiett x Leellamarz
Damini – Dog or Chick 3	Damini	Pass	Pass	Pass	Pass	Team The Quiett x Leellamarz
Untitled (Mixed by Cloudybeats)	Chillin Homie	Pass	Pass	Pass	Pass	Team Lil Boi x GroovyRoom
Polodared – DDE & ME	Polodared	Pass	Pass	Pass	Pass	Team Lil Boi x GroovyRoom
Floss (Prod. 083chee)	Fleeky Bang	Pass	Pass	Pass	Pass	Team Lil Boi x GroovyRoom
	Young Nine	Fail	Fail	Fail	Fail	—N/a
	Jay Young	Fail	Fail	Fail	Fail	—N/a
	Kim Myung-hoon	Fail	Fail	Fail	Fail	—N/a
	Sonza	Fail	Fail	Fail	Fail	—N/a
Remember (Prod. Justdan Beats)	Hoongyo	Pass	Pass	Fail	Pass	Team Jay Park x Slom
Trapped Feelings (Prod. Binzbeatz)	Cho Terry	Pass	Pass	Fail	Pass	Team Lil Boi x GroovyRoom
I'm Back (Prod. Ha In-hae (하인해) and Konquest)	Takewon	Pass	Pass	Pass	Pass	Team Jay Park x Slom
2022 Freestyle (Prod. Lean$moke)	Khan	Pass	Pass	Pass	Pass	Team Justhis x R. Tee
Apocalypse (Prod. D.K. The Punisher)	Justin Park	Pass	Fail	Fail	Fail	Team Jay Park x Slom
	Rolldice	Fail	Pass	Pass	Fail	Team Justhis x R. Tee
	Digital Dav	Pass	Fail	Pass	Pass	Team Lil Boi x GroovyRoom
	Lee Chan-hee	Fail	Fail	Fail	Fail	—N/a
	Eric Young	Fail	Fail	Fail	Fail	—N/a
	Sikboy	Fail	Fail	Fail	Fail	—N/a
Los – Big Mad	Los	Pass	Pass	Pass	Pass	Team Justhis x R. Tee
Less Friends (Prod. Bababa, Hyung, One)	Don Malik	Pass	Pass	Pass	Pass	Team Justhis x R. Tee
Roh Yun-ha (Prod. Codec)	Roh Yun-ha	Pass	Pass	Pass	Pass	Team Lil Boi x GroovyRoom
Blase (ft. The Quiett) – Retirement	Blase	Pass	Pass	Pass	Pass	Team Lil Boi x GroovyRoom
Trailblazer (Prod. Jay Dope)	Mckdaddy	Pass	Pass	Pass	Pass	Team Justhis x R. Tee
Counting (Prod. BMTJ)	Huh	Pass	Pass	Pass	Pass	Team Justhis x R. Tee
J'Kyun (ft. Marco); In The House Baby	J'Kyun	Pass	Pass	Pass	Pass	Team Jay Park x Slom
Untitled (Prod. Goneisback)	Goneisback	Pass	Pass	Fail	Pass	Team Lil Boi x GroovyRoom
6-year-old Driver (기사님 청소년 여다섯 명요) (Prod. Gufy)	Kim Min-seok	Fail	Fail	Fail	Fail	—N/a
Side (Prod. LA True, Ice Puff)	Lee Seo-jin	Pass	Pass	Pass	Pass	Team Jay Park x Slom
FREE BROCKHAMPTON + AMINE TYPE BEAT 2020 – Hoppin (Prod. Kyrigo)	Kim Do-yoon	Fail	Fail	Pass	Fail	Team The Quiett x Leellamarz
AMURUTZI (아무렇지 않아 않아) (Prod. Kimparkchella) (김박첼라)	Sleepy	Fail	Fail	Fail	Fail	—N/a
	Lee Hyun-jun	Fail	Fail	Fail	Fail	—N/a
Smoke (Prod. JustDan)	Kim Jae-wook	Pass	Pass	Pass	Pass	Team The Quiett x Leellamarz
ROUND 2 (Prod. Xinsayne)	Xinsayne	Pass	Pass	Pass	Pass	Team Jay Park x Slom
	Unofficialboyy	Pass	Pass	Pass	Pass	Team Justhis x R. Tee
Toigo (ft. Don Mills): BAAAM	Toigo	Pass	Fail	Pass	Fail	Team Jay Park x Slom
QM (ft. Bibi) – Canoe (카누)	QM	Pass	Pass	Pass	Pass	Team The Quiett x Leellamarz
	Vekoel	Fail	Fail	Pass	Pass	Team The Quiett x Leellamarz
G+cci Belt (Prod. Gargamel)	Crucial Star	Pass	Pass	Pass	Pass	Team The Quiett x Leellamarz
allaboutus (Prod. IFI)	Lee Young-ji	Pass	Pass	Pass	Pass	Team Jay Park x Slom
	Youngboy Shui	Fail	Fail	Fail	Fail	—N/a
	Park Myung-hoon	Pass	Pass	Pass	Pass	Team Jay Park x Slom
	Lee Jun-seo	Pass	Pass	Pass	Pass	Team Lil Boi x GroovyRoom
	Ray Hill	Pass	Pass	Pass	Pass	Team Lil Boi x GroovyRoom
	Jo Chae-hyun	Pass	Pass	Pass	Pass	Team Justhis x R. Tee
	YLN Foreign	Pass	Pass	Pass	Pass	Team Lil Boi x GroovyRoom
	Street Baby	Pass	Pass	Pass	Pass	Team The Quiett x Leellamarz
	Choi Jin-hyuk	Pass	Fail	Fail	Fail	Team Jay Park x Slom
	Koo Bon-gyeom	Pass	Fail	Pass	Fail	Team Jay Park x Slom
	Yanu	Pass	Pass	Pass	Pass	Team Jay Park x Slom

Results of Team Casting

Team	All Pass	3 Pass	2 Pass	1 Pass	Passed (Note: No revelation of how many passes in the broadcast)	Eliminated
Slay	Park Myung-hoon, Xinsayne, Lee Young-ji, Jambino, J'Kyun, Takewon, Yanu	Hoongyo	Toigo, Koo Bon-gyeom	Justin Park	—N/a	JP, Yonge Jaundice, Choi Jin-hyuk
R. Jus	Don Malik, Los, Mckdaddy, Unofficialboyy, Lee Seo-jin, Jo Chae-hyun, Khan, Huh	—N/a	Rolldice	—N/a	Neuns, Lee Seul-yi	V:enta Black
Quiolin	NSW Yoon, QM, Kim Jae-wook, Damini, Street Baby, Crucial Star	Woolenciah	—N/a	Kim Do-yoon	Max Kim, Song Jin-woo, J4 Prada	NY Dogg, Vekoel, Sharkrama, Kim Nongmil
Grillz	YLN Foreign, Roh Yun-ha, Blase, Lee Jun-seo, Chillin Homie, Polodared, Fleeky Bang	Goneisback, Digital Dav, Cho Terry	Kitsyojii	—N/a	—N/a	Ray Hill

Indicates the contestants who were eliminated.

=== Round Three: Guerilla Beat Cypher ===
This round features no beats played by the DJ, instead there would be two drummers/percussionists playing the drums and percussions live for original beats without melody, a first in the Show Me The Money series. On the stage there are two microphones, one lighted in blue and one lighted in red. The grabbing of those microphones are of a first-come, first-serve basis. One contestant would be on stage to grab whichever microphone that lights up first, and start his/her rap performance. After that, another contestant grabs the second microphone that lights up and start his/her rap performance. The beat ends when the contestant with the second microphone ends his/her rap performance. A total of 22 matchups are formed. The producer judges and some invited contestants who were eliminated earlier in the first and second rounds vote for the winner of each matchup. After this round, three contestants from each team would be eliminated.

Guerilla Beat Cypher Matchups

Blue Microphone				VS	Red Microphone			
Contestant	Team	First/Second To Rap	Result	VS	Contestant	Team	First/Second To Rap	Result
Xinsayne	Slay	Second	Lose	VS	YLN Foreign	Grillz	First	Win
Lee Seul-yi	R. Jus	First	Win	VS	Damini	Quiolin	Second	Lose
Yanu	Slay	First	Lose	VS	Blase	Grillz	Second	Win
Polodared	Grillz	First	Lose	VS	NSW Yoon	Quiolin	Second	Win
Neuns	R. Jus	Second	Lose	VS	Roh Yun-ha	First	Second	Win
QM	Quiolin	First	Lose	VS	Unofficialboyy	R. Jus	Second	Win
Takewon	Slay	Second	Win	VS	Huh	R. Jus	First	Lose
Chillin Homie	Grillz	Second	Win	VS	Hoongyo	Slay	First	Lose
Koo Bon-gyeom	Slay	First	Lose	VS	Kitsyojii	Grillz	Second	Win
Toigo	Slay	Second	Lose	VS	Fleeky Bang	Grillz	First	Win
Lee Jun-seo	Grillz	First	Lose	VS	J'Kyun	Slay	Second	Win
Cho Terry	Grillz	First	Lose	VS	Kim Jae-wook	Quiolin	Second	Win
Don Malik	R. Jus	First	Win	VS	Woolenciah	Quiolin	Second	Lose
Street Baby	Quiolin	First	Lose	VS	Mckdaddy	R. Jus	Second	Win
Song Jin-woo	Quiolin	Second	Win	VS	Digital Dav	Grillz	First	Lose
Justin Park	Slay	First	Win	VS	Lee Seo-jin	R. Jus	Second	Lose
Park Myung-hoon	Slay	First	Win (Note: As no one went on stage to grab the microphone after Park Myung-hoon's rap performance, this matchup is ruled as a win by default for Park Myung-hoon.)	VS	—N/a			
Jambino	Slay	First	Lose	VS	Goneisback	Grillz	Second	Win
Kim Do-yoon	Quiolin	First	Win	VS	Rolldice	R. Jus	Second	Lose
Los	R. Jus	Second	Win	VS	Max Kim	Quiolin	First	Lose
Khan	R. Jus	Second	Win	VS	J4 Prada	Quiolin	First	Lose
Crucial Star	Quiolin	Second	Win	VS	Jo Chae-hyun	R. Jus	First	Lose
—N/a				VS	Lee Young-ji	Slay	—N/a	Lose (Note: As Lee Young-ji did not grab the microphone at all in the round, she has lost by default, and is put in brink of elimination. However she would still show her rap performance in this round.)

Indicates the winning contestant.
Indicates the losing contestant.

Results of Guerilla Beat Cypher

Team	Advanced to Next Round	Eliminated
Slay	Park Myung-hoon, Xinsayne, Lee Young-ji, Jambino, Justin Park, J'Kyun, Takewon, Toigo	Koo Bon-gyeom, Yanu, Hoongyo
R. Jus	Don Malik, Los, Mckdaddy, Unofficialboyy, Lee Seo-jin, Jo Chae-hyun, Khan, Huh	Neuns, Rolldice, Lee Seul-yi
Quiolin	NSW Yoon, QM, Kim Do-yoon, Kim Jae-wook, Damini, Song Jin-woo, Woolenciah, Crucial Star	Max Kim, Street Baby, J4 Prada
Grillz	YLN Foreign, Goneisback, Roh Yun-ha, Blase, Chillin Homie, Kitsyojii, Polodared, Fleeky Bang	Digital Dav, Lee Jun-seo, Cho Terry

Indicates the contestants who were eliminated.

=== Round Four: Team Crew Battle ===
In this round, each producer team would be split into two crews of four contestants each, one crew being the Real crew and the other being the Fake crew. Each crew would choose a beat from their respective producer team, and perform together. After each producer team's crews perform, the winning crew is decided. The winning crew will have all its members advancing to the next round, while the losing crew will eliminate 2 of its members.

Crews for Team Crew Battle

Team	Real Crew	Beat	Result	VS	Fake Crew	Beat	Result	Eliminated
Slay	**Takewon**, J'Kyun, Park Myung-hoon, Justin Park	Jo Gwang-il – Compensation (깽값) (Prod. Slom)	Lose	VS	**Lee Young-ji**, Xinsayne, Jambino, Toigo	Jo Gwang-il – Compensation (깽값) (Prod. Slom)	Win	Takewon, Justin Park
R. Jus	**Don Malik**, Mckdaddy, Unofficialboyy, Khan	Justhis – Motherfucker Pt.2 (씹새끼)	Win	VS	**Huh**, Los, Lee Seo-jin, Jo Chae-hyun	Lisa – Money	Lose	Lee Seo-jin, Jo Chae-hyun
Quiolin	**NSW Yoon**, Kim Do-yoon, Kim Jae-wook, Crucial Star	Leellamarz – Selfish	Win	VS	**QM**, Damini, Song Jin-woo, Woolenciah	The Quiett – Nike	Lose	Song Jin-woo, Woolenciah
Grillz	**Roh Yun-ha**, YLN Foreign, Goneisback, Chillin Homie	Dok2 – Ambition And Vision	Lose	VS	**Polodared**, Blase, Kitsyojii, Fleeky Bang	Jay Park, Woodie Gochild, pH-1, Haon, Ourealgoat – Check My Bio	Win	YLN Foreign, Goneisback

Names in bold represent the leaders of the crews.

Indicates the winning crew.
Indicates the losing crew.
Indicates the contestants who were eliminated.

=== Round Five: Team Song Mission ===
In this round, during preparations for the mission, for each team, the producers would decide on one contestant that would be eliminated at the point, and the remaining five contestants would perform together with their producers. Unlike previous seasons, the performances will be held in front of a live audience. At the end of each performance, the producers of the performing producer team would eliminate one contestant. Similar to the previous season, the eliminated contestants after the performances will be part of the official release version of the songs.

Contestants eliminated before performance for Team Song Mission

Team	Eliminated
Slay	Park Myung-hoon
R. Jus	Unofficialboyy
Quiolin	Kim Do-yoon
Grillz	Kitsyojii

Round five result

Team	Contestants	Song name	Eliminated
Slay	J'Kyun, Lee Young-ji, Xinsayne, Jambino, Toigo	"We"	J'Kyun
R. Jus	Don Malik, Mckdaddy, Khan, Huh, Los	"My Way" (마이웨이)	Mckdaddy
Quiolin	NSW Yoon, Kim Jae-wook, Crucial Star, QM, Damini	"Ajushi" (아저씨)	Kim Jae-wook
Grillz	Roh Yun-ha, Chillin Homie, Polodared, Blase, Fleeky Bang	"We Higher" (위하여)	Polodared

Indicates the contestants who were eliminated.

=== Round Six: Team Diss Battle ===
For this round, in each battle, there would be two one-on-one diss battles and one four-on-four diss battle. After each battle, the live audience would vote to decide which team would be the winning team. The winning team will have all contestants moving on to the next round, while the losing team will have to eliminate one contestant.

Team Slay vs. Team Grillz
Beat	Team Grillz	Result	vs.	Beat	Team Slay	Result	Score	Eliminated
Noona, I'm Sorry in Advance (누나 미리 미안해) (Prod. Lil Xasimi)	Roh Yun-ha	Win	vs.	Chihuahua (Prod. Valo)	Lee Young-ji	Lose	17–95	Fleeky Bang
Mole (두더지) (Prod. Codec)	Blase	Win	vs.	Ostrich Egg (타조알) (Prod. omyo)	Xinsayne	Lose	17–95	Fleeky Bang
Slay Grabbing (Slay잡기)	Roh Yun-ha; Chillin Homie; Blase; Fleeky Bang	Lose	vs.	Anchovy Exhibition (멸치전문전) (Prod. monocat) + Youuu (Prod. Acesoulja, Toigo)	Lee Young-ji; Xinsayne; Jambino; Toigo	Win	17–95	Fleeky Bang
Team R. Jus vs. Team Quiolin
Beat	Team R. Jus	Result	vs.	Beat	Team Quiolin	Result	Score	Eliminated
TRAP (Prod. LEAN$MOKE)	Khan	Lose	vs.	Mosquito (모기놈) (Prod. JINBE, IM CHAAN)	NSW Yoon	Win	96–16	Damini
The Quiett – 2017	Don Malik	Win	vs.	Giriboy (ft. Kid Milli, ChoiLB, Kim Seungmin, Hayake) – vv2	QM	Lose	96–16	Damini
Weak Ass B (Prod. Raudy)	Don Malik; Khan; Huh; Los	Win	vs.	The Quiett – Prime Time + Still Got Luv	NSW Yoon; Crucial Star; QM; Damini	Lose	96–16	Damini

Indicates the winning team, with all its contestants advancing to the next round.
Indicates the winning contestant/team of the battle.
Indicates the losing contestant/team of the battle.
Indicates the contestants who were eliminated.

=== Round Seven: First Live Performances ===
For this round, winning teams of the previous round would go against each other and losing teams of the previous round would go against each other. All 4 producer teams would hold the mic selection for two of their own contestants to determine who would perform at the live stage; one contestant from each producer team would be eliminated. For each matchup, through two rounds of voting, the winner would be decided. The teams with the lesser money cumulated will each have to eliminate one contestant.

Team	Contestant	Song	Total Live Audience Votes (in ₩)	vs.	Team	Contestant	Song	Total Live Audience Votes (in ₩)	Eliminated Through Mic Selection
Grillz	Roh Yun-ha	Flick (Prod. GroovyRoom) (feat. Be'O, Haon)	16,750,000	vs.	Quiolin	QM	Come to my Stu (feat. Leellamarz)	9,150,000	Chillin Homie; Crucial Star
Grillz	Blase	Holiday (Prod. GroovyRoom) (feat. Lil Boi, Giriboy)	14,850,000	vs.	Quiolin	NSW Yoon	Therapy + Eri Eri (으리으리) (feat. Homies)	12,850,000	—N/a
Slay	Toigo	Blue Check (Prod. Slom) (feat. Jay Park, Jessi)	—N/a (Note: Due to a technical issue during Khan's stage, the entire performance was forcefully ended. After an emergency discussion between the two producer teams, they agreed to restart Khan's stage, and that the votes for Toigo and Khan would be invalidated, a first in the Show Me the Money history.)	vs.	R. Jus	Khan	Compass (나침반) (Prod. R. Tee) (feat. Uneducated Kid, Superbee)	—N/a	Xinsayne; Los
Slay	Jambino	Bingo (Prod. Slom) (feat. meenoi, George)	8,150,000	vs.	R. Jus	Huh	Burn Up (펄펄) (Prod. R. Tee) (feat. Dynamic Duo)	16,850,000	—N/a
Slay	Lee Young-ji	Not Sorry (Prod. Slom) (feat. pH-1)	13,850,000	vs.	R. Jus	Don Malik	Eye (눈) (Prod. R. Tee) (feat. Big Naughty, Justhis)	14,200,000	—N/a

Indicates the winning contestant of the matchup.
Indicates the contestants who were eliminated.

Result of First Performances

Team	Total Live Audience Votes (in ₩)	vs.	Team	Total Live Audience Votes (in ₩)	Eliminated
Grillz	31,600,000	vs.	Quiolin	22,000,000	QM
Slay	22,000,000	vs.	R. Jus	31,050,000	Toigo

Indicates the winning team.
Indicates the contestants who were eliminated.

=== Round Eight: Semi-final Performances ===
For this round, the matchups are decided based on the contestants of Team Grillz (the team with the most cumulated money in the previous round) each picking their opponents, followed by Don Malik (who was on Team R. Jus which has the second most cumulated money in the previous round) picking his opponent, and the remaining two not picked would automatically be matched up. For each matchup, through two rounds of voting, the winner would be decided. The contestant with more money would advance to the final, while the other contestant would be eliminated.

Team	Contestant	Song	Total Live Audience Votes (in ₩)	vs.	Team	Contestant	Song	Total Live Audience Votes (in ₩)	Eliminated
Grillz	Roh Yun-ha	Vroom (Prod. GroovyRoom) (feat. Lil Boi, Swings)	11,750,000	vs.	R. Jus	Huh	Ugly Duckling (미운 오리 새끼) (Prod. R. Tee) (feat. Sunwoo Jung-a, Bobby)	15,650,000	Roh Yun-ha
Grillz	Blase	Name Tag (Prod. GroovyRoom) (feat. Sik-K, Coogie)	13,650,000	vs.	R. Jus	Khan	Goblin (도깨비) (Prod. R. Tee) (feat. Homies)	13,550,000	Khan
R. Jus	Don Malik	PPAK (빡) (Prod. R. Tee) (feat. Justhis, Paloalto)	15,700,000	vs.	Slay	Jambino	Like Water (feat. Loco, Hyuna)	12,000,000	Jambino
Quiolin	NSW Yoon	Love (feat. Paul Blanco, Ash Island)	10,400,000	vs.	Slay	Lee Young-ji	Witch (Prod. Slom) (feat. Jay Park, So!YoON!)	17,400,000	NSW Yoon

Indicates the winning contestant of the matchup.
Indicates the contestants who were eliminated.

=== Round Nine: Final Performances (Live Episode) ===
The final round will be televised live, and the winner of the season is decided based from the votes from both the live audience and live SMS voting. The four finalists will meet up prior at a undisclosed location to determine their order of performances. The final round will be divided into two parts: the first part of the finals featured all four finalists each having a performance with special guest performer(s) as featuring. After all four finalists performed, a two-round voting process from both the live audience and live SMS voting will be held, and the performance ranking based on the live audience will be announced. In the second part of the finals, the four finalists will each perform with their producer(s) and/or special guest performer(s) featuring, with the same two-round voting process and announcement of performance ranking held after the final performances. The contestant who earned the most cumulative performance money from both the pre-finals online evaluation team voters and live SMS voters in all two performances will be the season's champion, will receive ₩100,000,000 in prize money, plus first class air ticket and accommodation stay in Beverly Hills, worth ₩100,000,000 in total. The final episode will also include a special performance from eliminated contestants, with the song to be included in this season's official discography.

Finals - Part 1
Rank (From Total Live Mnet Plus Votes)	Team	Contestant	Song
1st	Slay	Lee Young-ji	Hug (Prod. Slom) (feat. Zion.T, Wonstein)
3rd	R. Jus	Don Malik	Original (Prod. R. Tee) (feat. Sion)
4th	Grillz	Blase	Chosen 1
2nd	R. Jus	Huh	See You! (Prod. R. Tee) (feat. Sole)

Finals - Part 2
Rank (From Total Live Audience Votes)	Team	Contestant	Song
TBA	Slay	Lee Young-ji	Dejavu (Prod. Slom) (feat. Jay Park)
TBA	R. Jus	Don Malik	Bathtub (욕조) (Prod. R. Tee) (feat. Wheein, Justhis)
TBA	Grillz	Blase	Diamonds (feat. Lil Boi)
TBA	R. Jus	Huh	Way Up (Prod. R. Tee) (feat. Camo, Justhis)

Special Performance
Contestants	Song
Chillin Homie, Roh Yun-ha, Fleeky Bang, Khan	Go (Prod. Giriboy)

Combined Finals Results (Part 1 and Part 2)
Rank	Team	Contestant	Total live votes (1%=1,000,000₩) (live Mnet Plus votes 30% + live SMS votes 70%)
1	Slay	Lee Young-ji	48,370,000
2	R. Jus	Huh	23,620,000
3	Grillz	Blase	15,130,000
4	R. Jus	Don Malik	12,880,000

Indicates winner of Show Me the Money 11
Indicates the 1st runner-up
Indicates the 2nd and 3rd runner-ups

== Show Me the Money 11 Top 24 ==
Contestant	Team	Round 1	Round 2	Round 3	Round 4	Round 5	Round 6	Round 7	Semi-finals	Finals
Lee Young-ji	Slay	PASS	ALL-PASS	LOST	WON	SAFE	WON	LOST	WON	WINNER
Huh	R. Jus	PASS	ALL-PASS	LOST	LOST	SAFE	WON	WON	WON	1ST RUNNER-UP
Blase	Grillz	PASS	ALL-PASS	WON	WON	SAFE	LOST	WON	WON	2ND RUNNER-UP
Don Malik	R. Jus	PASS	ALL-PASS	WON	WON	SAFE	WON	WON	WON	3RD RUNNER-UP
NSW Yoon	Quiolin	PASS	ALL-PASS	WON	WON	SAFE	WON	LOST	ELIM	
Jambino	Slay	PASS	ALL-PASS	LOST	WON	SAFE	WON	LOST	ELIM	
Khan	R. Jus	PASS	ALL-PASS	WON	WON	SAFE	LOST	TIE	ELIM	
Roh Yun-ha	Grillz	PASS	ALL-PASS	WON	LOST	SAFE	LOST	WON	ELIM	
QM	Quiolin	PASS	ALL-PASS	LOST	LOST	SAFE	LOST	ELIM		
Toigo	Slay	PASS	2-PASS	LOST	WON	SAFE	WON	ELIM		
Los	R. Jus	PASS	ALL-PASS	WON	LOST	SAFE	WON	ELIM		
Xinsayne	Slay	PASS	ALL-PASS	LOST	WON	SAFE	WON	ELIM		
Crucial Star	Quiolin	PASS	ALL-PASS	WON	WON	SAFE	LOST	ELIM		
Chillin Homie	Grillz	PASS	ALL-PASS	WON	LOST	SAFE	LOST	ELIM		
Damini	Quiolin	PASS	ALL-PASS	LOST	LOST	SAFE	ELIM			
Fleeky Bang	Grillz	PASS	ALL-PASS	LOST	WON	SAFE	ELIM			
Polodared	Grillz	PASS	ALL-PASS	LOST	WON	ELIM				
Kim Jae-wook	Quiolin	PASS	ALL-PASS	WON	WON	ELIM				
Mckdaddy	R. Jus	PASS	ALL-PASS	WON	WON	ELIM				
J'Kyun	Slay	PASS	ALL-PASS	WON	LOST	ELIM				
Kitsyojii	Grillz	PASS	2-PASS	WON	WON	ELIM				
Kim Do-yoon	Quiolin	PASS	1-PASS	WON	WON	ELIM				
Unofficialboyy	R. Jus	PASS	ALL-PASS	WON	WON	ELIM				
Park Myung-hoon	Slay	PASS	ALL-PASS	WON	LOST	ELIM				

== Controversy ==
- In Round Three, Lee Young-ji was given a chance to rap although she failed to grab the microphone in the 22 rounds. This sparked controversy with viewers complaining that the production team gave preferential treatment to her.
