= Leellamarz =

Leellamarz 김민겸
- Born: Kim Min-kyum; July 4, 1995 (age 31)
- Genre: Hip hop
- Occupations: Rapper; singer
- Instruments: Vocals, violin
- Years active: 2017–present
- Label: Ambition Musik
- Website: illionaire.kr

Korean name
- Hangul: 김민겸
- RR: Gim Mingyeom
- MR: Kim Min'gyŏm

Kim Min-kyum (Korean: 김민겸; born July 4, 1995), better known by his stage name Leellamarz (릴러말즈), is a South Korean rapper and singer. He was a contestant on Show Me the Money 5. He released his debut album Y on July 7, 2017. In June 2019 he joined Dok2 and The Quiett's sub-label, Ambition Musik.

== Early life and education ==
Kim came across hip hop in the first year of middle school. He graduated from Seoul Arts High School early and entered Korea National University of Arts at age 17.

== Discography ==
=== Studio albums ===
Title	Details	Peak chart positions	Sales
Title	Details	KOR	Sales
Y	Released: July 7, 2017; Label: Wayside Town; Formats: Digital download; Track listing: 1. "Star"; 2. "Tunnel" (터널); 3. "Friends"; 4. "1 for the Music"; 5. "What You Want" feat. Superbee, Urb Fisher; 6. "Complex"; 7. "ㅈㅈㅇ"; 8. "X" (Acapella Ver.); 9. "Y"	—	—
Violinist	Released: November 16, 2018; Label: STRAD; Formats: Digital download; Track listing: 1. "You"; 2. "When You Are Alone" (방에 혼자 있을 때) feat. Changmo, Ash Island; 3. "Trip" feat. Hannah; 4. "Another Body" (두 개였으면 해) feat. The Quiett; 5. "Lie" (거짓말) feat. Owen Ovadoz, Ash Island; 6. "Ice" feat. Hash Swan; 7. "Senorita" feat. myunDo; 8. "Lalala"; 9. "Please"; 10. "Rainbow"	87	—
Marz 2 Ambition	Released: June 21, 2019; Label: Ambition Musik; Formats: Digital download; Track listing: 1. "True" feat. Beenzino (Prod. Way Ched); 2. "Choice" (우린 시간앞에 무엇을 선택해야 할까) feat. 22 (Prod. Way Ched); 3. "Cold" (Prod. Boycold); 4. "Ambition" (야망) feat. Ash Island, Keem Hyo-eun, Hash Swan, Changmo (Prod. Toil); 5. "1" feat. Dok2 (Prod. GroovyRoom); 6. "W Signs Up" feat. Wayside (Prod. Midas P); 7. "Jhoncnow" feat. Owen Ovadoz, Justhis, Takeone (Prod. Way Ched); 8. "Broken" feat. Vinxen, Woo (Prod. Boycold); 9. "Winnin" feat. Jvcki Wai (Prod. Panda Gomm); 10. "Drunk" feat. 22 Prod. (Panda Gomm); 11. "Izakaya" feat. Sik-K (Prod. Way Ched); 12. "Feel" (삘) feat. Coogie (Prod. Kid Wine); 13. "Perfect" (Prod. Way Ched)	—	—
Life is Once	Released: October 26, 2023; Label: Ambition Musik; Formats: CD, digital download; Track listing: 1. "Hangover"; 2. "On the street" feat. Ash Island; 3. "I don't know a single thing" feat. Meenoi; 4. "Nice Man"; 5. "Russian Roulette" feat. Street Baby; 6. "B**ch" feat. Changmo; 7. "Mr. complain" 8. "20's" 9. "Boys Like Girls" feat. Gist, Jayci Yucca; 10. "RAPSTAR"; 11. "Masquerade Ball" feat. Sik-K; 12. "Life is"	49	KOR: 2,075
"—" denotes releases that did not chart.

=== Single albums ===
Title	Album details
Baboo with Toil	Released: December 7, 2018; Label: STRAD; Formats: CD, digital download
Nambu Bus Terminal	Released: July 18, 2019; Label: Ambition Musik; Formats: CD, digital download

=== Extended plays ===
Title	Album details	Peak chart positions
Title	Album details	KOR
Toystory with Toil	Released: September 21, 2018; Label: STRAD; Formats: CD, digital download	—
Marz 2 Venus	Released: October 19, 2018; Label: STRAD; Formats: CD, digital download	—
, (Comma)	Released: November 23, 2018; Label: STRAD; Formats: CD, digital download	—
Marz 2 Mercury	Released: November 30, 2018; Label: STRAD; Formats: CD, digital download	—
Marz 2 Earth	Released: December 29, 2018; Label: STRAD; Formats: CD, digital download	—
Marz 2 Moon	Released: January 11, 2019; Label: STRAD; Formats: CD, digital download	—
Spring Break	Released: March 13, 2019; Label: STRAD; Formats: CD, digital download	—
Room Service with GroovyRoom	Released: September 9, 2019; Label: H1GHR MUSIC, Ambition Musik; Formats: CD, digital download	52
[Leellamarz] Is Different. with Apro	Released: October 25, 2019; Label: Ambition Musik; Formats: CD, digital download	—
"—" denotes releases that did not chart.

=== Singles ===
Title	Year	Peak chart positions	Album
Title	Year	KOR	Album
As lead artist
"What You Want" feat. Superbee, Urb Fisher	2017	—	Y
"You"	2018	—	Non-album releases
"Trip" feat. Hannah	2018	125	Non-album releases
"Molla" (몰라) feat. Jayci Yucca, :p gloo	2018	—	Toystory with Toil
"Missed call" (부재중) feat. 100KGOLD"	2018	—	Toystory with Toil
"Never Know feat. PH-1	2018	—	Non-album release
"31" feat. BRADYSTREET	2018	—	Marz 2 Venus
"If I Got Money" feat. Crucial Star, Changmo	2018	—	Marz 2 Venus
"Another Body" (두 개였으면 해) feat. The Quiett	2018	—	Non-album release
"When You Are Alone" (방에 혼자 있을 때) feat. Changmo, Ash Island	2018	—	Violinist
"Please"	2018	—	Violinist
"Something Is Everything" feat. Ja Mezz, Hannah	2018	—	, (Comma)
"Wanna"	2018	—	Marz 2 Mercury
"Scatter" (흐트러져) feat. Kid Wine, Ash Island	2018	—	Marz 2 Mercury
"Baboo" feat. OLNL	2018	—	Baboo
"Made It" feat. Superbee (Prod. Dakshood)	2018	—	Non-album release
"Taekwondo" (태권도) feat. The Quiett	2018	—	Marz 2 Earth
"Rain Shower" (소나기) feat. Hash Swan	2019	—	Marz 2 Moon
"Mist" (안개) feat. Justhis	2019	—	Non-album releases
"Pretty Woman" feat. Keem Hyo-eun	2019	—	Non-album releases
"So I Call It Love" feat. jeebanoff, Changmo	2019	—	Non-album releases
"Homesickness" With Way Ched (feat. Simon Dominic)	2019	—	Non-album releases
"Choice" (우린 시간앞에 무엇을 선택해야 할까) feat. 22	2019	—	Marz 2 Ambition
"Ambition" (야망) feat. Ash Island, Keem Hyo-eun, Hash Swan, Changmo	2019	—	Marz 2 Ambition
"Izakaya" feat. Sik-K	2019	—	Marz 2 Ambition
"Nambu Bus Terminal"	2019	—	Nambu Bus Terminal
"No!" Feat. Suran	2019	—	Non-album releases
"Self Isolation" (자가격리) Feat. Paloalto	2022	106	Non-album releases
"City Lights" Feat. Hash Swan	2022	137	Non-album releases
"Number" Feat. Big Naughty	2022	141	Non-album releases
"On the Street" (거리에서) Feat. Ash Island	2023	90	Life Is Once
"I Don't Know a Single Thing" (한 개도 몰라) Feat. Meenoi	2023	127	Life Is Once
"Boys Like Girls" (이쁜 여자가 좋더라) Feat. Gist and Jayci Yucca	2023	49	Life Is Once
"Bitch" (나쁜 X) Feat. Changmo	2023	147	Life Is Once
As collaborations
"Namchin" With The Quiett	2018	—	Non-album releases
"Shot" With Frankie James (feat. Tommy Strate)	2018	—	Non-album releases
"Sakura" With Frankie James (feat. The Quiett)	2018	—	Non-album releases
"Skrrt" With. Keem Hyo-eun, Panda Gomm	2019	—	Non-album releases
"Fuxx With Me" With. Jaegone	2019	—	Spring Break
"Homesickness" with Way Ched (feat. Simon Dominic)	2019	—	Non-album releases
"Beer" (비워) with Changmo, Hash Swan, Ash Island, Keem Hyo-eun, The Quiett	2019	43	Non-album releases
"City Life" (도시생활) With GroovyRoom	2019	—	Room Service
"In my Room" With GroovyRoom	2019	—	Room Service
"I Think" with Apro (Feat. Penomeco)	2019	—	[Leellamarz] Is Different
"VS" with Apro	2019	—	[Leellamarz] Is Different
"Bition Way" with Ash Island, Zene The Zilla, The Quiett	2019	—	Non-album release
"Don't Do That" (하지마) with Toil	2022	117	Toystory3
"Talk Tomorrow" (내일 얘기해) with Meenoi	2024	155	[B]
"Let Off Steam" (와이셔츠를 다렸지) with Yang Hong-won	2024	161	L&B
"—" denotes releases that did not chart.

== Filmography ==
=== Television show ===
Year	Title	Role	Notes	Ref.
2022	Show Me the Money 11	Producer	with The Quiett	

== Awards and nominations ==
Name of the award ceremony, year presented, award category, nominee(s) and the result of the award
Award ceremony	Year	Category	Nominee/work	Result	Ref.
MAMA Awards	2024	Best Rap & Hip Hop Performance	"Boys Like Girls" (feat. Gist & Jayci Yucca)	Nominated	
MAMA Awards	2024	Song of the Year	"Boys Like Girls" (feat. Gist & Jayci Yucca)	Nominated	
