= Ambition Musik =

South Korean hip-hop label

- Founded: September 29, 2016; 9 years ago
- Distributor: CJ E&M
- Genre: Hip hop
- Country of origin: South Korea
- Location: Seoul, South Korea
- Official website: ambitionmusik.com

Ambition Musik (Korean: 앰비션뮤직) is a South Korean hip-hop label founded by rappers Dok2 and The Quiett on September 29, 2016.

== History ==
The label was founded on September 29, 2016, under Illionaire Records with artists Keem Hyo-eun, Changmo, and Hash Swan. As Illionaire Records was widely known for its three-member lineup—Dok2, The Quiett, Beenzino—the company decided a sub-label would be more fit than signing artists under the mother label.

On June 11, 2019, producer Way Ched, who worked with many artists including Sik-K, Punchnello, and Simon Dominic, joined as a new member with the news of his first full-length album "COMFY", which was released at 6 p.m. on June 14.

On June 18, 2019, Leellamarz was signed with the news of his full-length album "MARZ 2 AMBITION," which was released at 6 p.m. on the June 21st.

On 18 July 2019, the label signed Zene The Zilla, a member of the YTC4LYF Crew.

After a fruitful year of artist albums and compilations, AMBITION MUSIK was selected as the "Label of the Year" at the 2020 Korea Hip-Hop Awards.

After Beenzino's departure from the label, parent company Illionaire Records disbanded on July 6, 2020. Ambition Musik announced it would continue as an independent label.

Following the dissolution of Illionaire Records, The Quiett and fellow rapper Yumdda established Daytona Entertainment on November 25, 2020. The Quiett continued to serve as CEO of AMBITION MUSIK, although he was no longer an artist under the label.

AMBITION MUSIK subsequently continued to expand and reorganize its artist roster. Don Malik joined the label on October 13, 2021, followed by Paul Blanco on March 22, 2022. Ash Island's contract expired on July 7, 2024, and was not renewed, while Changmo's contract ended on April 7, 2025.

The label continued to add new artists in 2026, with Trade L joining on April 27, MilliMax on May 1, and Untell on May 24. Paul Blanco departed from the label on March 16, 2026, following the conclusion of his contract.

== Artists ==
=== Current Artists ===
- Keem Hyo-eun
- Hash Swan
- Way Ched
- Leellamarz
- Zene the Zilla
- Don Malik
- NOSUN
- Trade L
- MilliMax
- Untell

=== Former Artists ===
- Ash Island
- Changmo
- Paul Blanco
