= Don Malik =

South Korean rapper (born 1996)

Don Malik 던말릭
- Born: Moon In-seop; January 21, 1996 (age 29); Seoul, South Korea
- Genres: Hip hop
- Occupation: Rapper
- Years active: 2014-present
- Labels: Ambition Musik

Moon In-seop (Korean: 문인섭; born January 21, 1996), known professionally as Don Malik (Korean: 던말릭) is a South Korean rapper. In 2020, he released his debut studio album Malik the Cactus Flower, which received critical acclaim.

== Early life and education ==
Moon In-seop was born on January 21, 1996, in Seoul. He became interested in hip hop after listening to Drunken Tiger and MC Sniper's music. He decided to become a rapper when he was in the second year of high school and took rap lessons from rapper JJK.

He graduated from Hongik University High School.

== Career ==
=== 2014–2018: Signing to Daze Alive Music ===
In 2014, Don Malik signed to Daze Alive Music and released his debut single "The Way I Am". In 2015, he released collaboration album Umbilical Cord with record producer Mild Beats, whose lead single "About Muse" received critical acclaim. In 2016, he released collaboration album Tribeast with record producer Kima, which received critical acclaim.

=== 2019-present: Signing to Ambition Musik ===
In 2020, he released his debut studio album Malik the Cactus Flower, which received critical acclaim. In 2021, he signed to Ambition Musik and released his second studio album Paid in Seoul. In 2022, he appeared on Show Me the Money 11.

== Controversy ==
In February 2018, Don Malik was accused of sexually harassing an underage fan and was kicked out of Daze Alive. However, in September 2018, he disclosed his non-indictment letter and claimed that he was innocent.

== Discography ==
=== Studio albums ===
Title	Details	Peak chart position
Title	Details	KOR
선인장화: Malik the Cactus Flower	Released: March 6, 2020; Label: TheCut; Format: CD, digital download	39
Paid in Seoul	Released: October 19, 2021; Label: Ambition Musik; Format: CD, digital download	50

=== Collaboration albums ===
Title	Details
Umbilical Cord (탯줄; Taetjul) (with Mild Beats)	Released: March 31, 2015; Label: Daze Alive; Format: Digital download
Tribeast (with Kima)	Released: April 19, 2016; Label: Daze Alive; Format: Digital download

== Filmography ==
=== Television shows ===
Year	Title	Role	Ref.
2022	Show Me the Money 11	Contestant	

== Awards and nominations ==
Award	Year	Nominee	Category	Result	Ref.
Korean Music Awards	2017	Tribeast	Best Rap Album	Nominated	
Korean Hip-hop Awards	2020	"Bad News Cypher vol.1"	Collaboration of the Year	Nominated	
Korean Hip-hop Awards	2021	Malik the Cactus Flower	Hip-Hop Album of the Year	Nominated	
