= Indigo (Justhis, Kid Milli, Noel, and Yang Hong-won song) =

Single by Justhis, Kid Milli, Noel, Yang Hong-won

from the album IM
- Language: Korean
- Released: June 24, 2018
- Genre: Hip-hop
- Length: 4:01
- Label: Indigo Music
- Composer: BRLLNT
- Lyricists: Justhis; Kid Milli; Noel; Yang Hong-won

"Indigo" (stylized as "IndiGO") is a song by South Korean rappers Justhis, Kid Milli, Noel, and Yang Hong-won. It was released on June 24, 2018, by Indigo Music as the lead single of the compilation album IM. It won hip-hop track of the year and collaboration of the year at the Korean Hip-hop Awards.

== Critical reception ==
"Indigo" won hip-hop track of the year and collaboration of the year at the Korean Hip-hop Awards. According to KHA, it "shows who the next generation of Korean hip-hop is".

== Charts ==
Chart (2018)	Peak position
South Korea (Gaon)	17

== Remix ==
"Indigo Remix" (stylized as "IndiGO Remix") is the remix of "Indigo" by South Korean rappers Giriboy, The Quiett, Mommy Son, and Swings. It was released on December 12, 2018, by Indigo Music.
