= Han Yo-han =

South Korean rapper (born 1991)

Han Yo-han 한요한
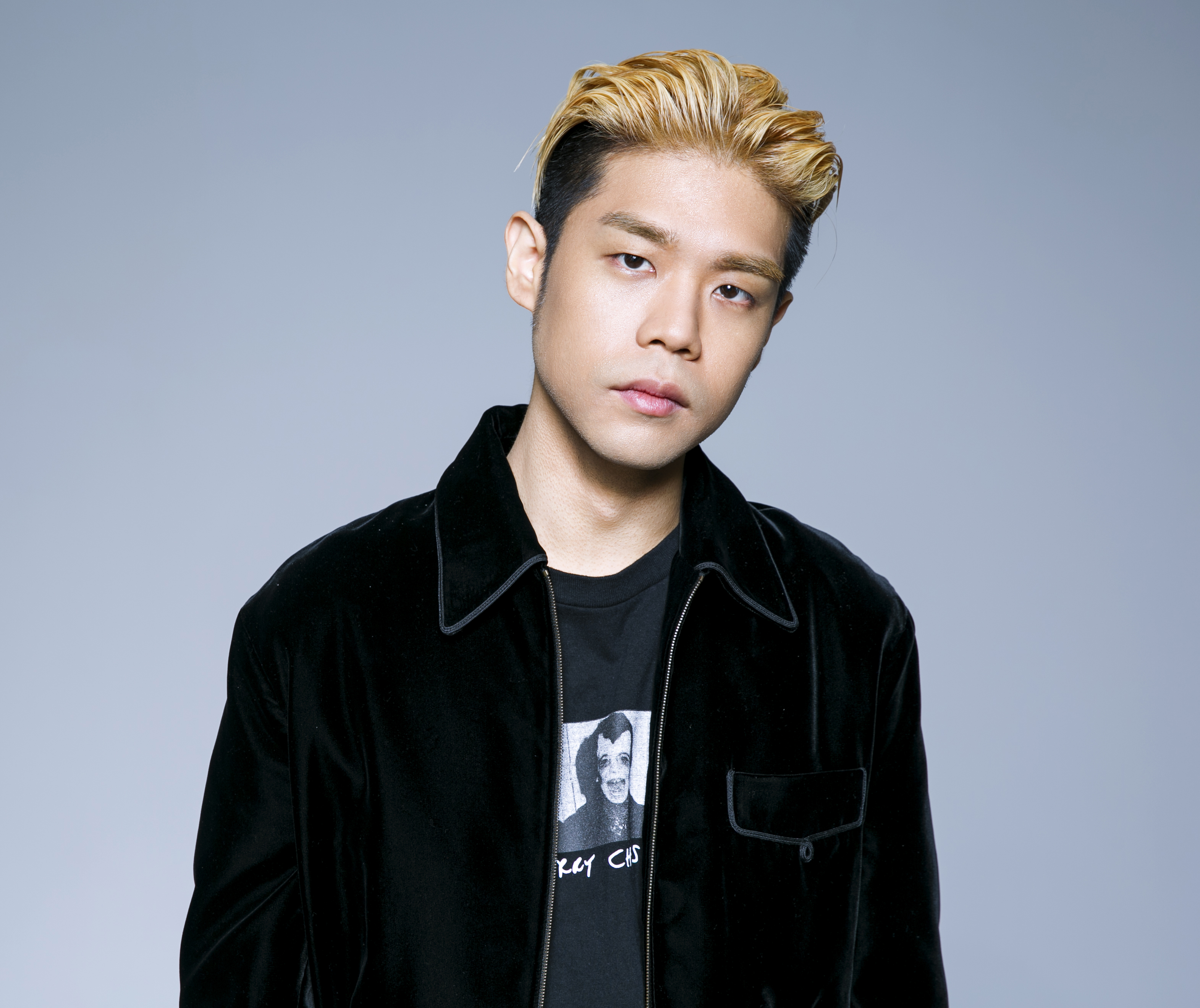
- Han in 2017

Background information
- Born: December 3, 1991 (age 34); Seoul, South Korea
- Genres: Hip hop, rock
- Occupations: Rapper, composer
- Instruments: Vocals, guitar
- Years active: 2012–present
- Label: Just Music
- Website: wejustmusic.com

Korean name
- Hangul: 한요한
- RR: Han Yohan
- MR: Han Yohan

Han Yo-han (Korean: 한요한; born December 3, 1991) is a South Korean rapper and composer. He released his debut EP Selfmade on May 21, 2015. He is best known for the song "Dding", which he features in alongside Jvcki Wai, Young B and Osshun Gum.

== Discography ==
=== Studio albums ===
Title	Details	Peak chart positions	Sales
Title	Details	KOR	Sales
Exiv (엑시브)	Released: March 9, 2019; Label: Just Music; Formats: CD, Digital download	31	KOR: 1,772
Spirit Bomb (원기옥)	Released: March 28, 2020; Label: Just Music; Formats: CD, Digital download	44	KOR: 2,069
Han Yo Han (초희귀종)	Released: September 14, 2021; Label: Just Music; Formats: CD, Digital download	49	—N/a
Time Machine	Released: November 10, 2022; Label: Just Music; Formats: CD, Digital download	—	—N/a
Shining Star	Released: June 13, 2023; Label: Just Music; Formats: CD, Digital download	66	KOR: 1,342
"—" denotes releases that did not chart.

=== Extended plays ===
Title	Details	Peak chart positions	Sales
Title	Details	KOR	Sales
Selfmade	Released: May 21, 2015; Label: GRDL; Formats: CD, Digital download	—	—N/a
911	Released: May 19, 2016; Label: Canent; Formats: CD, Digital download	—	—N/a
Musashi (기타 멘 무사시)	Released: November 30, 2016; Label: Just Music; Formats: CD, Digital download	—	—N/a
The Blade Dance (칼춤)	Released: May 15, 2017; Label: Just Music; Formats: CD, Digital download	—	—N/a
Musashi 2 (기타 멘 무사시2)	Released: February 12, 2018; Label: Just Music; Formats: CD, Digital download	—	—N/a
Dragon Bike (청룡쇼바)	Released: August 12, 2018; Label: Just Music; Formats: CD, Digital download	—	—N/a
Stuck Together (외나무다리) with Swings	Released: July 6, 2019; Label: Just Music; Formats: CD, Digital download	—	—N/a
"—" denotes releases that did not chart.

=== Singles ===
Title	Year	Peak chart positions		Album
Title	Year	KOR Circle	KOR Hot	Album
As lead artist
"Good Girl" feat. Verbal Jint, Jihyun	2015	—	—	Selfmade
"Fire" feat. Microdot, Isle	2016	—	—	911
"Super Saiyan" feat. Black Nut	2017	—	—	Musashi
"Hookzap2" (훅잽이)	2017	—	—	Non-album single
"Workroom" (작업실) feat. Woo Hye-mi	2017	—	—	The Blade Dance
"Bumper Car" (범퍼카)	2018	—	—	Musashi 2
"Movie Theater" (영화관) feat. Choi LB	2018	—	—	Musashi 2
"Helicopter" (헬리콥터)	2018	—	—	Non-album single
"Mood Maker" feat. Changmo, Justhis, Giriboy	2018	—	—	Dragon Bike
"Don't Worry" (걱정마)	2018	—	—	Non-album singles
"Broken Pieces" (산산조각)	2019	—	—	Non-album singles
"Fire Flower" (불꽃)	2019	—	—	Non-album singles
"Routine" (반복)	2020	—	—	Non-album singles
"400km" feat. Kid Milli	2020	—	—	Spirit Bomb
"All In" (올인) feat. Paul Blanco, Changmo	2020	—	—	All In
"Humidifier" (가습기)	2021	—	—	Non-album single
"This Is Me" (이게 나야)	2021	—	—	Han Yo Han
"Bucket List" (버킷리스트) feat. Skinny Brown	2022	—	—	Time Machine
"Monday to Sunday" (월화수목금토일) feat. Kim Seung-min	2022	—	—	Time Machine
"It's You" feat. No:El	2023	141	—	Shining Star
Collaborations
"Dding" (띵) prod. Giriboy with Jvcki Wai, Young B, Osshun Gum	2019	3	4	Non-album single
"Whistle" (호루라기) with Swings	2019	—	—	Stuck Together
"Fake Rock Star" with Swings feat. No:el	2019	—	—	Stuck Together
"Usain Bolt" (우사인볼트) with Swings feat. Young B	2019	—	—	Stuck Together
"Last Girl" with Daesung	2025	—	—	D's Wave
"—" denotes releases that did not chart.
