= Hippy Was Gipsy =

South Korean R&B duo

- Origin: South Korea
- Genre: R&B
- Years active: 2016–present
- Label: Stoneship
- Members: Jflow; Sep

Korean name
- Hangul: 히피는 집시였다
- Revised Romanization: Hipineun Jipsiyeotda
- McCune–Reischauer: Hip'inŭn Chipsiyŏtta

Hippy Was Gipsy (Korean: 히피는 집시였다) is a South Korean R&B duo consisting of members Jflow and Sep. They debuted in 2016 with the EP Island, and have since released three full-length albums: Tree (2017), Language (2018), and Empty Hands (2018). Tree won awards for best R&B album at both the 2018 Korean Music Awards and the 2018 Korean Hip-hop Awards.

== Discography ==
=== Studio albums ===
Title	Album details	Peak chart positions
Title	Album details	KOR
Tree (나무)	Released: June 12, 2017; Label: Stoneship; Format: CD, digital download	99
Language (언어)	Released: March 29, 2018; Label: Stoneship; Format: CD, digital download	64
Empty Hands (빈손)	Released: October 29, 2018; Label: Stoneship; Format: CD, digital download	—
"—" denotes release did not chart.

=== Extended plays ===
Title	Album details	Peak chart positions
Title	Album details	KOR
Island (섬)	Released: December 21, 2016; Label: Stoneship; Format: CD, digital download	—
"—" denotes release did not chart.

== Awards and nominations ==
=== Korean Hip-hop Awards ===
Year	Category	Nominated work	Result	Ref.
2018	R&B Album of the Year	Tree	Won	
2018	Collaboration of the Year	"Fall" (지네) (with Kim O Ki)	Nominated	
2019	R&B Album of the Year	Language	Nominated	

=== Korean Music Awards ===
Year	Category	Nominated work	Result	Ref.
2018	Best R&B & Soul Album	Tree	Won	
2018	Best R&B & Soul Song	"Dot" (점)	Nominated	
2019	Best R&B & Soul Album	Language	Nominated	
2019	Best R&B & Soul Song	"Bed" (침대)	Nominated	
