= Jvcki Wai =

South Korean rapper

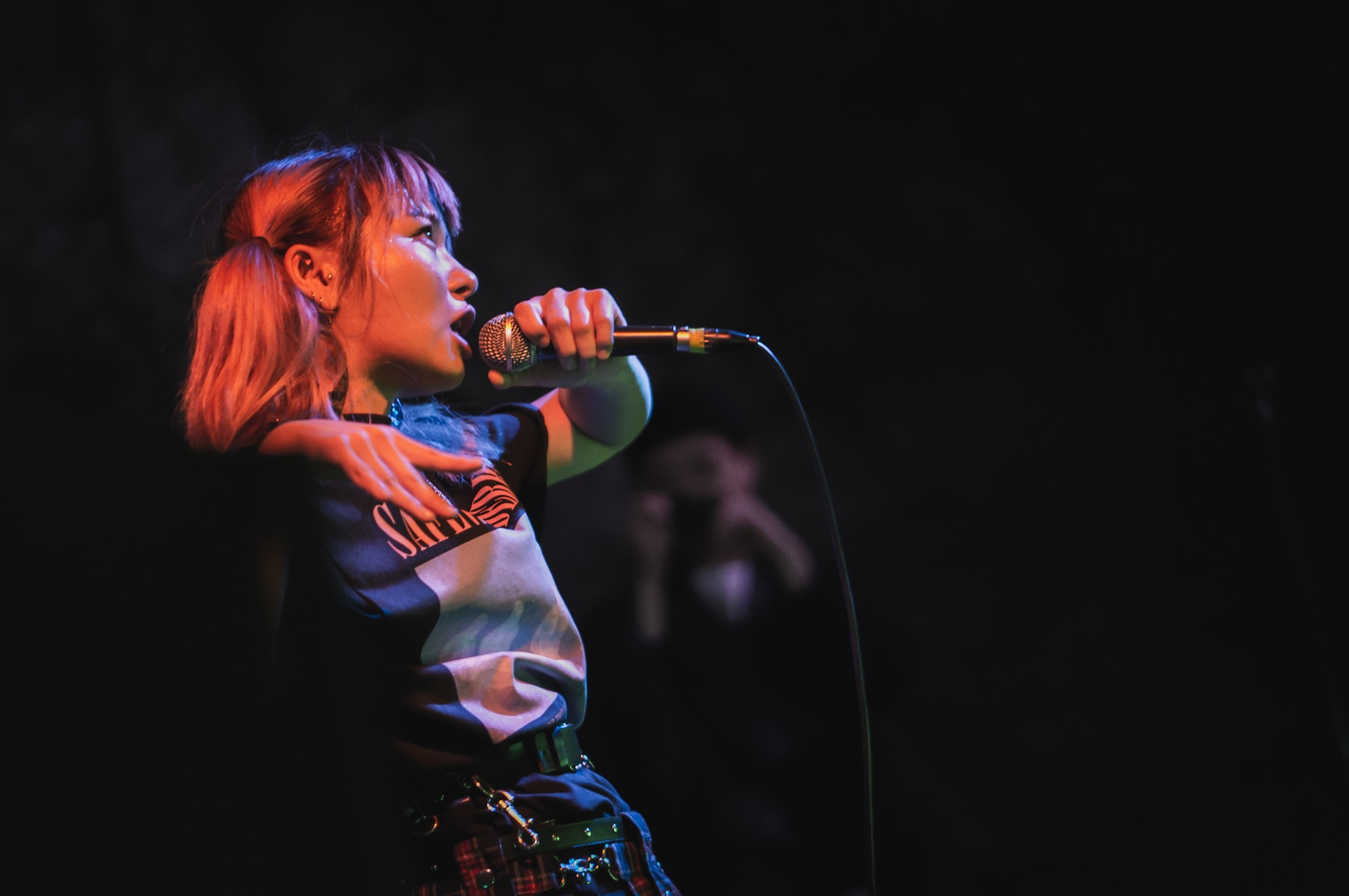
- Jvcki Wai in 2019

Background information
- Born: Hong Ye-eun; July 5, 1996 (age 30); Seoul, South Korea
- Genre: Hip hop
- Occupation: Rapper
- Years active: 2016–present
- Label: AOMG

Korean name
- Hangul: 홍예은
- RR: Hong Yeeun
- MR: Hong Yeŭn

Hong Ye-eun (Korean: 홍예은; born July 5, 1996), known professionally as Jvcki Wai (Korean: 재키와이), is a South Korean rapper. In 2018, she signed to Indigo Music and released her debut studio album Enchanted Propaganda. In 2021, she won Collaboration of the Year at the Korean Hip-hop Awards with "Fadeaway".

== Early life ==
Hong Ye-eun was born on July 5, 1996. She wanted to be a singer-songwriter when she was young, but later became interested in hip hop. In 2013, she won Galmighty, a rapper competition hosted by rapper Fana.

== Career ==
=== 2016-2019: Signing to Indigo Music ===
In 2016, Jvcki Wai released her debut extended play Exposure. In 2017, she released her second extended play Neo Eve. In January 2018, she signed to Indigo Music. In July 2018, she released her debut studio album Enchanted Propaganda. In January 2019, she released single "Dding" with rappers Yang Hong-won, Osshun Gum, and Han Yo-han, which received critical acclaim. In October 2019, she departed from Indigo Music as her contract expired.

=== 2020-present: Signing to AOMG ===
In 2020, Jvcki Wai released single "Fadeaway" with Coogie, Paloalto, The Quiett, and Bassagong, which later won Collaboration of the Year at the Korean Hip-hop Awards. In 2022, she signed to AOMG.

== Artistry ==
Jvcki Wai garnered attention for her outspokenness of the prejudices that female rappers often face in the rap scene.

== Discography ==
=== Studio albums ===
Title	Album details	Peak chart positions
Title	Album details	KOR
Enchanted Propaganda	Released: July 6, 2018; Label: Indigo Music; Format: CD, digital download; Track listing: 1. "SPIKA"; 2. "Life Disorder"; 3. "dOgMa"; 4. "Digital Camo"; 5. "Enchanted Propaganda"; 6. "HATE Generation"; 7. "NeoClear"; 8. "Anti-"; 9. "Capitalism"; 10. "War Is Ready"	63
Mollak	Released: 2025; Label: KC, AOMG; Format: CD, digital download; Track listing: 1. "GG"; 2. "1 Coin"; 3. "Choom"; 4. "Wreck Car"; 5. "Narak"; 6. "Ms. Menhera"; 7. "Bungaetan"; 8. "Necrophilia"	—
"—" denotes releases that did not chart or were not released in that region.

=== Extended plays ===
Title	Album details
Exposure	Released: November 2, 2016; Label: The Ugly Junction; Format: CD, digital download; Track listing: 1. "A Signal/Analyzer"; 2. "Lo-Fi"; 3. "EXPOSURE" feat. PNSB; 4. "Out of Frame"; 5. "Back to What"
Neo Eve	Released: December 20, 2017; Label: Stoneship; Format: CD, digital download; Track listing: 1. "Anarchy"; 2. "No Maria But a Human"; 3. "RIB"; 4. "To. Lordfxxker"; 5. "EvEry Breath"

=== Singles ===
Title	Year	Peak chart positions	Album
Title	Year	KOR	Album
As lead artist
"Exposure" feat. PNSB	2016	—	Exposure
"Anarchy"	2017	—	Neo Eve
"Enchanted Propaganda"	2018	—	Enchanted Propaganda
"Go Back"	2022	—	Non-album single
Collaborations
"119 REMIX" (Various Artists)	2017	—	Non-album single
"Buru Star" with NO:EL, Kid Milli, Young B	2018	—	IM
"Work Out" with Kid Milli, NO:EL, Young B, Swings	2018	—	IM
"Hyperreal" with Kid Milli, Swings	2018	—	IM
"180409" with JUSTHIS, Kid Milli	2018	—	IM
"Beluga" with Kid Milli	2018	—	Maiden Voyage III
"KOCEAN" with Kid Milli	2018	—	Maiden Voyage III
"Dding" (띵) with Young B, Osshun Gum, Han Yo-han	2019	3	Non-album single
"IMJMWDP" (Produced by Giriboy) with Giriboy, NO:EL, Black Nut, Young B, Osshun Gum, YUNHWAY, JUSTHIS, Kid Milli, Han Yo Han, Swings	2019	—	Non-album single
As featured artist
"Freak Show" FUTURISTIC SWAVER Feat. Jvcki Wai, Paloalto	2016	—	Futuristic Swaver Vs. The World
"Paranoize" Eco Yard Feat. Swervy, Jvcki Wai	2017	—	Non-album single
"IZAKAYA" Kid Milli Feat. Jvcki Wai	2018	—	AI, THE PLAYLIST
"bird" Kid Milli Feat. Jvcki Wai	2018	—	IMNOTSPECIAL
"Pure Cure" HD BL4CK Feat. Jvcki Wai	2018	—	Liberation
"야 인마" SUPERBEE, twlv Feat. Jvcki Wai	2018	—	벼락부자애들
"#ALL4MYSELF" Lil Cherry Feat. YUNHWAY, Tommy Strate, Jito Mo, Jvcki Wai	2018	—	SAUCE TALK
"Amazing" UNEDUCATED KID Feat. Paul Blanco & Jvcki Wai	2018	—	UNEDUCATED WORLD
"Okay Cool" FUTURISTIC SWAVER Feat. Jvcki Wai	2018	—	Futuristic Language
"stop talking!" Bryn Feat. Jvcki Wai	2018	—	Q
"Makgeolli" (막걸리) Jeremy Que$t Feat. Young Savage Coco, Kitchen K, Jvcki Wai	2018	—	Before the Quest
"DJ Light, DJ Wegun (Girls Around The World Mix)" KIRIN Feat. Jvcki Wai, Hoody, SUMIN	2018	—	Non-album single
"Finish Line" Jay Park Feat. SUPERBEE & Jvcki Wai	2018	—	Non-album single
"Liquor" ZENE THE ZILLA Feat. Jvcki Wai	2018	—	Do Not Call Me. I'm Flying
"heybrady!" BRADYSTREET Feat. Jvcki Wai	2018	—	HE6RT TE6RS
"FNTSY" So!YoON! Feat. Jvcki Wai	2019	—	So!YoON!
"WINNIN" (Produced By Panda Gomm) Leellamarz Feat. Jvcki Wai	2019	—	MARZ 2 AMBITION
"Don't Know" Jinbo Feat. Jvcki Wai	2019	—	SBS Hip Hop King - Nassna Street OST Part 1
"SUNDAYSINNERS" STXXCH Feat. Jvcki Wai	2019	—	Glitters of Blue
"GOTT" Simon D Feat. MOON, Woo & Jvcki Wai	2019	88	No Open Flames
"Daredevil" (천둥벌거숭이) ZICO Feat. Jvcki Wai, Yumdda	2019	20	THINKING Part.1
"Tiger Den" (호랑이소굴) Giriboy Feat. Jvcki Wai	2019	45	Non-album single
"—" denotes release did not chart.

== Awards and nominations ==
Award	Year	Nominee	Category	Result	Ref.
Melon Music Awards	2019	"Dding"	Best Rap Track	Nominated	
Korean Hip-hop Awards	2019	"Enchanted Propagranda"	Hip-hop Track of the Year	Nominated	
Korean Hip-hop Awards	2021	"Fadeaway"	Collaboration of the Year	Won	
Korean Hip-hop Awards	2021	"Fadeaway"	Music Video of the Year	Nominated	
