= Ash Island (rapper) =

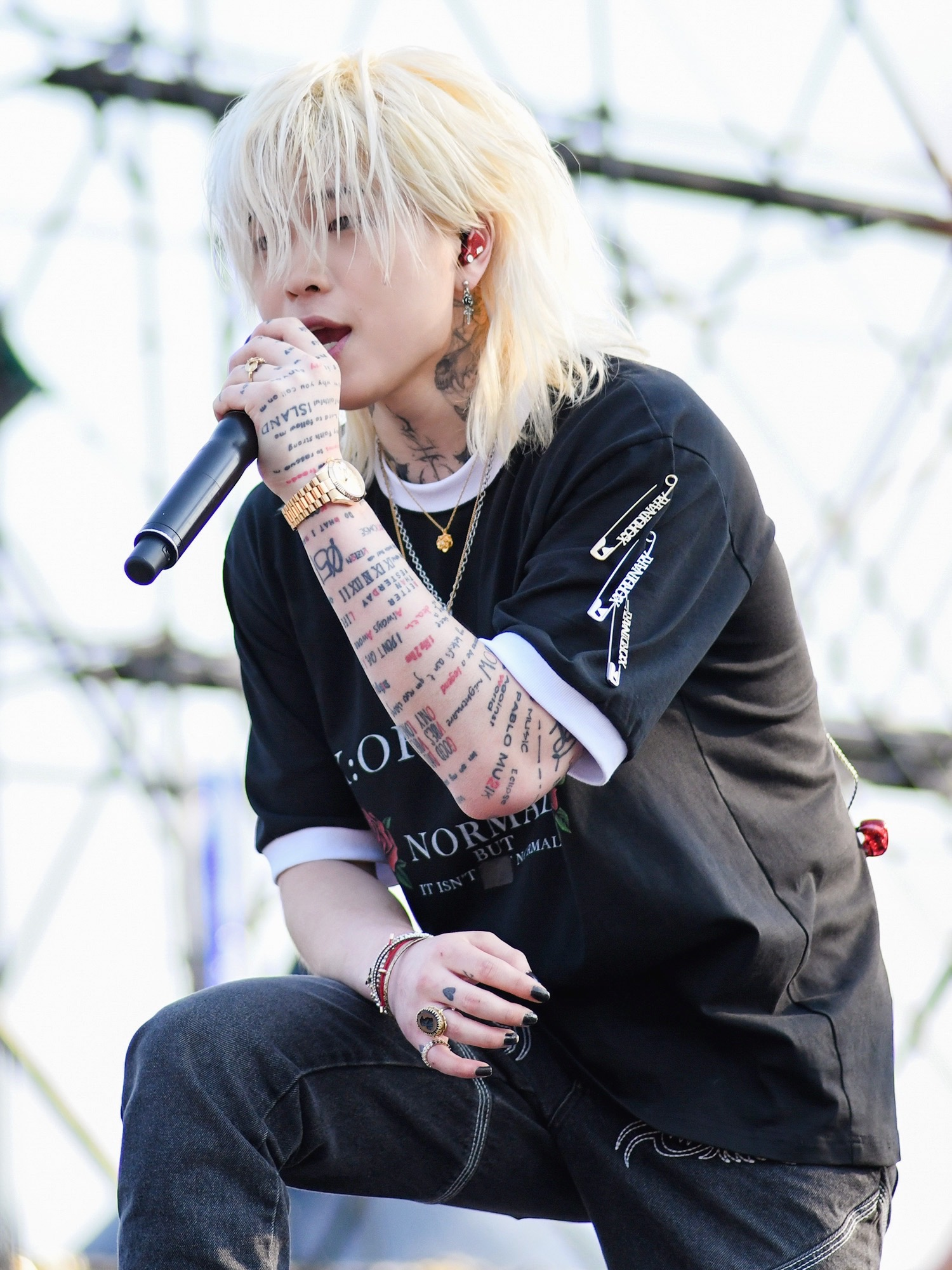
- Ash Island at The Cry Ground Festival, May 2022
- Born: Yoon Jin-young; August 11, 1999 (age 26); Busan, South Korea
- Occupations: Rapper; singer; songwriter
- Years active: 2018–present
- Spouse: Chanmina (m. 2024)
- Children: 1
- Musical career
- Also known as: Clloud
- Genres: Hip hop
- Labels: Ambition; Midnight
- Website: ambitionmusik.com

Korean name
- Hangul: 윤진영
- Hanja: 尹軫映
- RR: Yun Jinyeong
- MR: Yun Chinyŏng

Yoon Jin-young (Korean: 윤진영, Hanja: 尹軫映; born August 11, 1999), better known by his stage name Ash Island (애쉬아일랜드, stylized in all caps), formerly Clloud (클라우드), is a South Korean rapper, singer and songwriter. He was a contestant on season 2 of Mnet's High School Rapper, where he finished in 4th place. He joined The Quiett's sub-label, Ambition Musik in November 2018. He released his debut album, Ash, on March 22, 2019.

== Personal life ==
On July 7, 2024, Yoon announced his marriage to Korean-Japanese rapper Chanmina and her pregnancy with the couple's first child. On November 1, the couple welcomed their first child, a baby girl.

== Discography ==
=== Studio albums ===
Title	Details	Peak chart positions	Sales
Title	Details	KOR	Sales
Ash	Released: March 22, 2019; Label: Ambition Musik; Formats: CD, digital download; Track listing: 1. "Paranoid"; 2. "Valhalla" (발할라) (feat. Hash Swan, Yami Tommy); 3. "Deadstar" (feat. Changmo); 4. "Forgot U" (feat. Bloo); 5. "Submarine" (잠수함) (feat. Tommy Strate); 6. "Q Mark" (feat. EK, Hash Swan); 7. "Fall"	11	KOR: 2,424
Island	Released: March 5, 2021; Label: Ambition Musik; Formats: CD, digital download; Track listing: 1. "Melody" (멜로디); 2. "Okay" (feat. Swings); 3. "Over"; 4. "A Star Is Born"; 5. "Grand Prix" (그랑프리) (feat. Beenzino); 6. "Checks" (feat. Superbee, Jay Park, The Quiett); 7. "Eclipse"; 8. "Lonely"; 9. "Error" (feat. Loopy); 10. "Beautiful" (feat. Skinny Brown); 11. "One More Night" (feat. Lil Boi)	—N/a	—N/a
Rose	Released: May 3, 2023; Label: Ambition Musik; Formats: CD, digital download	24	KOR: 3,654
Voice Memo	Released: March 12, 2025; Label: Midnight Records; Formats: CD, digital download; Track listing: 1. "It's Okay" (feat. Zico); 2. "Ghost Of You"; 3. "1+1"; 4. "Illusory Dream (Interlude)"; 5. "Heartbreak Anniversary" (feat. SOLE); 6. "ECHO"; 7. "Like the First Time" (feat. Skinny Brown); 8. "Promise Me"; 9. "OST" (feat. Chanmina); 10. "I don't wanna be your hero"	50	KOR: 1,758
"—" denotes releases that did not chart.

=== Singles ===
==== As lead artist ====
Title	Year	Peak chart positions	Album
Title	Year	KOR	Album
"Night Vibe (Remake)"	2018	—	Non-album singles
"How R U"	2018	—	Non-album singles
"Deadstar" (feat. Changmo])	2018	—	Non-album singles
"Forgot U" (feat. Bloo)	2019	—	Ash
"Paranoid"	2019	—	Ash
"Nightmare" (악몽)	2019	—	Non-album singles
"Paranoid Remix" (feat. Changmo, Paul Blanco)	2019	—	Non-album singles
"Empty Head"	2019	—	Non-album singles
"Error" (feat. Loopy)	2020	61	Island
"Melody" (멜로디)	2021	21	Island
"Grand Prix" (그랑프리) (feat. Beenzino)	2021	137	Island
"One More Night" (feat. Lil Boi)	2021	162	Island
"NOYB" (신경꺼)	2021	155	More Island
"Because"	2022	67	Non-album singles
"Everything"	2022	157	Non-album singles
"Goodbye" (작별인사) (feat. Paul Blanco)	2023	135	Rose
"Stay with Me" (feat. Skinny Brown)	2023	77	Non-album singles
"OST" (feat. Chanmina)	2024	138	Non-album singles
"—" denotes releases that did not chart.

==== Collaborative singles ====
Title	Year	Peak chart positions	Album
Title	Year	KOR	Album
"Bition Boyz" (with Hash Swan, Kim Hyo-eun, Changmo)	2019	—	Non-album singles
"Band" (with Changmo, Hash Swan, Kim Hyo-eun)	2019	30	Non-album singles
"Beer" (비워) (with Changmo, Hash Swan, Kim Hyo-eun, Leellamarz, The Quiett)	2019	43	Non-album singles
"Bition Way" (with Leellamarz, Zene The Zilla, The Quiett)	2019	—	Non-album singles
"Pay Day" (with Junggigo & KozyPop, prod. Gray)	2020	83	Non-album singles
"Don't Go" (with Chanmina)	2022	—	Non-album singles
"—" denotes releases that did not chart.

== Awards and nominations ==
Name of the award ceremony, year presented, award category, nominee(s) of the award, and the result of the nomination
Award ceremony	Year	Category	Nominee(s)/work(s)	Result	Ref.
Korean Hip-hop Awards	2020	New Artist of the Year	Ash Island	Won	
Golden Disc Awards	2022	Seezn Most Popular Artist Award	Ash Island	Nominated	
Melon Music Awards	2021	Top 10 Artists (Bonsang)	Ash Island	Won	
Mnet Asian Music Awards	2021	Best HipHop & Urban Music	Ash Island	Won	
Seoul Music Awards	2022	R&B / Hip-Hop Award	Ash Island	Nominated	
