= Yang Hong-won =

South Korean rapper (born 1999)

Yang Hong-won 양홍원
- Also known as: YANGHONGWON, Young B
- Born: January 12, 1999 (age 27); Seoul, South Korea
- Genre: Hip hop
- Occupation: Rapper
- Instrument: Vocals
- Years active: 2017–present
- Label: Indigo Music

- Korean name
- Hangul: 양홍원
- RR: Yang Hongwon
- MR: Yang Hongwŏn

Yang Hong-won (Korean: 양홍원; born January 12, 1999), formerly known professionally as Young B (영비), is a South Korean rapper. He was the winner of the first season of High School Rapper. He released his first extended play, Sokonyun, on August 17, 2018.

== Discography ==
=== Studio albums ===
Title	Album details	Peak chart positions	Sales
Title	Album details	KOR	Sales
Stranger	Released: February 16, 2019; Label: Indigo Music, Kakao Entertainment; Formats: CD, digital download	42	—N/a
3 Steps Forward, 2 Steps Back (오보에)	Released: June 19, 2021; Label: Indigo Music, Kakao Entertainment; Formats: CD, digital download	20	KOR: 4,301
Slowmo	Released: May 26, 2024; Label: Indigo Music, Kakao Entertainment; Formats: CD, digital download	22	KOR: 4,000

=== Extended plays ===
Title	Album details
Sokonyun	Released: February 23, 2017; Label: Indigo Music, Kakao Entertainment; Formats: CD, digital download
Drugonline Gate with Unofficialboyy, Gamma	Released: August 13, 2021; Label: D.O.G, YG Plus; Formats: CD, digital download

=== Charted singles ===
Title	Year	Peak chart positions		Album
Title	Year	KOR Digital	KOR Billboard	Album
As lead artist
"Better Man" feat. Crucial Star	2017	52	—	Non-album singles
"In the Morning" (아침에) feat. Bryn	2017	28	—	Non-album singles
Collaborations
"Bunzi" (번지) with Giriboy, Xitsuh	2017	28	—	Non-album singles
"Yozm Gang" (요즘것들) feat. Zico, Dean with Hangzoo, Hash Swan, Killagramz	2017	5	—	Non-album singles
"Search" feat. Car, the Garden with Hangzoo	2017	11	—	Non-album singles
"Indigo" with Justhis, Kid Milli, No:el	2018	17	20	IM
"Dding" (띵) prod. Giriboy Jvcki Wai, Osshun Gum, Han Yo-han	2019	3	4	Non-album singles
"Bada" (바다) with Woodie Gochild, Choi LB, Big Naughty, Chillin Home	2019	48	—	Non-album singles
"The Truman Show" (트루먼 쇼) with YunB	2019	60	—	Non-album singles
"Sold Out" feat. Vinxen	2019	99	—	Non-album singles
"Let Off Steam" (와이셔츠를 다렸지) with Leellamarz	2024	161	—	L&B
"화" with Panda Gomm	2026	151	—	오보

== Filmography ==
=== Television ===
Year	Program	Notes
2015	Show Me the Money 4	contestant
2016	Show Me the Money 5	contestant
2017	High School Rapper season 1	contestant
2017	Show Me the Money 6	contestant
2019	Show Me the Money 8	contestant
