= Deepflow =

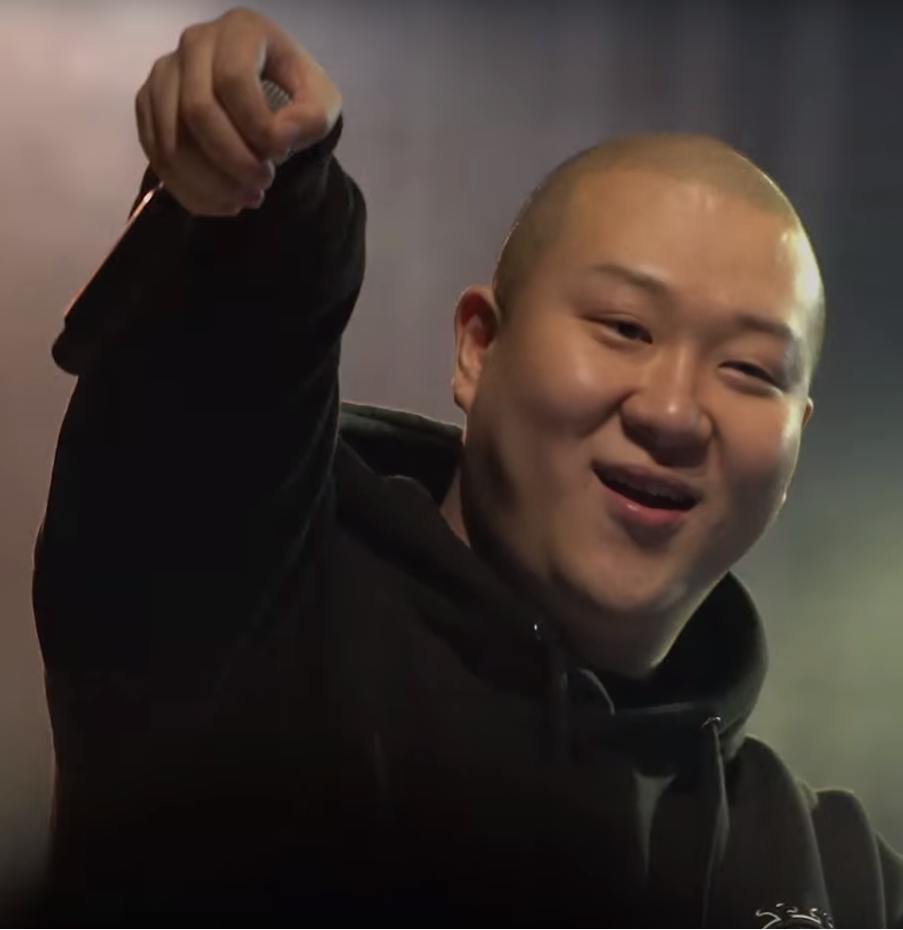
- Deepflow in 2017

Background information
- Born: Ryu Sang-goo; 2 August 1984 (age 42); South Korea
- Genre: Korean hip hop
- Occupations: Rapper; music producer; record label CEO
- Years active: 2007–present
- Label: Vismajor Company
- Spouse: Unknown (m. 2021)
- Website: vismajorcompany.com

Korean name
- Hangul: 류상구
- RR: Ryu Sanggu
- MR: Ryu Sanggu

Ryu Sang-gu (Korean: 류상구; born 1984), known by the stage name Deepflow (딥플로우) is a South Korean rapper, music producer, and CEO of the hip hop record label Vismajor Company. He won the award for Musician of the Year at the 2016 Korean Music Awards.

== Personal life ==
In February 2021, Deepflow announced his plans to marry a non-celebrity. Due to the coronavirus pandemic, the wedding was postponed to December 2021.

== Discography ==
=== Studio albums ===
Title	Album details	Peak chart positions	Sales
Title	Album details	KOR	Sales
Vismajor	Released: June 11, 2007; Label: Sony Music Korea; Formats: CD	—	—N/a
Heavy Deep	Released: October 20, 2011; Label: Vismajor Company; Formats: CD, digital download	—	—N/a
Yanghwa	Released: April 13, 2015; Label: Vismajor Company; Formats: CD, digital download	22	KOR: 500+
Founder	Released: April 13, 2020; Label: Vismajor Company; Formats: CD, LP, digital download	—	
"—" denotes releases that did not chart or were not released in that region.

=== Other charted songs ===
Title	Year	Peak chart positions	Sales (DL)	Album
Title	Year	KOR	Sales (DL)	Album
"Cut Cut Cut" (작두) feat. Nucksal, Huckleberry P	2015	55	KOR: 66,958+	Yanghwa
"Forever 84" with Yumdda, Paloalto, Simon Dominic, The Quiett	2019	94	—N/a	Dingo x Damoim (Part 1)
"I'mma Do" (아마두) with Yumdda, Paloalto, Simon Dominic, The Quiett, feat. Woo Won-jae, Kim Hyo-eun, Nucksal, Huckleberry P	2019	2	—N/a	Dingo x Damoim (Part 2)
"J2B" (중2병) with Yumdda, Paloalto, Simon Dominic, The Quiett	2019	63	—N/a	Dingo x Damoim (Part 3)
"Run Damoim" (달려) with Yumdda, Paloalto, Simon Dominic, The Quiett	2019	54	—N/a	Dingo x Damoim (Part 4)

== Awards and nominations ==
Year	Award	Category	Nominee	Result	Ref.
2016	Korean Music Awards	Musician of the Year	—N/a	Won	
2016	Korean Music Awards	Best Hip Hop Song	"Cut Cut Cut" feat. Nucksal, Huckleberry P	Won	
2018	Korean Hip Hop Awards	Collaboration of the Year	"Equus"; Chaboom feat. Paloalto, Swings, Deepflow	Nominated	
2020	Korean Hip Hop Awards	Collaboration of the Year	"I'mma Do"(아마두) with Yumdda, Paloalto, Simon Dominic, The Quiett, feat. Woo Won-jae, Kim Hyo-eun, Nucksal, Huckleberry P	Won	
