= Homies (musical group) =

South Korean hip-hop group

- Origin: South Korea
- Genres: Hip hop
- Years active: 2019-present
- Labels: Yng & Rich Records
- Members: Chin; CK; Louie

Homies (Korean: 호미들; RR: Homideul) is a South Korean hip hop group composed of Chin, CK, and Louie. They first garnered attention when they appeared on the YouTube hip hop audition program Superbee's Rap Academy in 2019.

They signed to Yng & Rich Records in 2020 where they released the studio album Generation (2021) and extended plays Ghetto Superstars (2020) and Family Business (2021). They won 1 Gaon Chart Music Awards, 1 Melon Music Awards, and 2 Korean Hip-hop Awards.

== Career ==
=== 2019-2020: Ghetto Kids and signing to Yng & Rich Records ===
In June 2019, Homies appeared on the YouTube hip hop audition program Superbee's Rap Academy and finished in second place. In November 2019, they released their debut EP B.F.A.M.

In May 2020, they released their debut studio album Ghetto Kids, which was nominated for Underrated Album of the Year at the Korean Hip-hop Awards. In December 2020, they signed to Yng & Rich Records, a hip hop label established by rapper Superbee.

=== 2021-2022: "Siren Remix" ===
In February 2021, Homies won New Artist of the Year at the Korean Hip-hop Awards. In March 2021, they released the single "Siren Remix" featuring rappers Uneducated Kid and Paul Blanco. It became their first single to enter the Gaon Digital Chart and peaked at number 18. In December 2021, they released their second studio album Generation and won Best Music Style at the Melon Music Awards.

In January 2022, they won Discovery of the Year at the Gaon Chart Music Awards. In February 2022, they appeared on the YouTube hip hop audition program Drop the Bit as judges.

== Discography ==
=== Studio albums ===
| Title | Details |
|---|---|
| Ghetto Kids | Released: May 15, 2020; Labels: G.M.S.P, Wuzo Entertainment; Format: Digital download |
| Generation | Released: December 14, 2021; Labels: Yng & Rich Records, Kakao Entertainment; Format: Digital download |

=== Extended plays ===
| Title | Details |
|---|---|
| B.F.A.M | Released: November 15, 2019; Labels: G.M.S.P, Wuzo Entertainment; Format: Digital download |
| 진인사대천명 | Released: January 28, 2020; Labels: G.M.S.P, Wuzo Entertainment; Format: Digital download |
| Ghetto Superstars | Released: December 14, 2020; Labels: Yng & Rich Records, Kakao Entertainment; Format: Digital download |
| Family Business | Released: May 18, 2021; Labels: Yng & Rich Records, Kakao Entertainment; Format: Digital download |

=== Singles ===
| Title | Year | Peak chart position | Album |
| Title | Year | KOR | Album |
|---|---|---|---|
| "School Record" (생기부; Saenggibu) | 2020 | — | School Record |
| "Chanel No.5" (샤넬 No.5) | 2020 | — | School Record |
| "Goliath" (골리앗) | 2020 | — | Goliath |
| "Daily Laborer" (상하차; Sanghacha) | 2020 | — | Goliath |
| "Never" (절대; Jeoldae) | 2021 | — (Note: "Never" did not enter the Gaon Digital Chart but peaked at number 89 on the Gaon Download Chart.) | Never |
| "Drama" | 2021 | — | Never |
| "Siren Remix" (사이렌 Remix) (featuring Uneducated Kid and Paul Blanco) | 2021 | 18 | Non-album single |
| "All Mine" | 2021 | — | Tomb Raider King OST Part.2 |
| "Told You So" (했던 말; Haetdeon mal) | 2021 | — (Note: "Told You So" did not enter the Gaon Digital Chart but peaked at number 95 on the Gaon Download Chart.) | Hang Out |
| "Broken Ferrari" | 2022 | — | Non-album singles |
| "Pour Soju on My Grave When I Die" (무덤 위에 소주를 부어줘) | 2022 | 200 | Non-album singles |

== Awards and nominations ==
| Award | Year | Nominee | Category | Result | Ref. |
|---|---|---|---|---|---|
| Gaon Chart Music Awards | 2022 | Themselves | Discovery of the Year (Hip hop) | Won | |
| Melon Music Awards | 2021 | Themselves | Best Music Style | Won | |
| Korean Hip-hop Awards | 2021 | Themselves | New Artist of the Year | Won | |
| Korean Hip-hop Awards | 2021 | Ghetto Kids | Underrated Album of the Year | Nominated | |
| Korean Hip-hop Awards | 2021 | "Siren" | Music Video of the Year | Nominated | |
| Korean Hip-hop Awards | 2022 | Themselves | Artist of the Year | Nominated | |
| Korean Hip-hop Awards | 2022 | "Sirean Remix" | Collaboration of the Year | Won | |
