= Yumdda =

South Korean rapper and former VJ

- Born: Yeom Hyeon-soo; April 20, 1984 (age 42)
- Origin: Ulsan, South Korea
- Genre: Hip-hop
- Occupations: Rapper; TV host
- Years active: 2006–present
- Label: Daytona Entertainment

Korean name
- Hangul: 염현수
- RR: Yeom Hyeonsu
- MR: Yŏm Hyŏnsu

Yeom Hyeon-su (Korean: 염현수; born April 20, 1984), better known as Yumdda (염따), is a South Korean rapper and former VJ for MTV Korea.

On November 25, 2020, he and former Illionaire Records artist The Quiett established their new record label Daytona Entertainment, after the closure of Illionaire Records.

== Discography ==
=== Studio albums ===
Title	Album details	Peak chart positions	Sales
Title	Album details	KOR	Sales
Breathe (살아숨셔)	Released: February 18, 2016; Label: Stoneship; Formats: CD, digital download	—	—N/a
Mina	Released: July 6, 2017; Label: Yumdda; Formats: CD, digital download	87	—N/a
Breathe 2 (살아숨셔 2)	Released: January 9, 2019; Label: Yumdda; Formats: CD, digital download	—	—N/a
"—" denotes releases that did not chart.

=== Charted songs ===
Title	Year	Peak chart positions	Album
Title	Year	KOR	Album
"Don't Call Me" (돈 Call Me) prod. by BRLLNT	2019	43	Non-album single
"Forever 84" with Deepflow, Paloalto, Simon Dominic, The Quiett	2019	94	Dingo x Damoim (Part 1)
"I'mma Do" (아마두) with Deepflow, Paloalto, Simon Dominic, The Quiett, feat. Woo Won-jae, Kim Hyo-eun, Nucksal, Huckleberry P	2019	2	Dingo x Damoim (Part 2)
"Amanda" feat. Simon Dominic	2019	59	Non-album single
"J2B" (중2병) with Deepflow, Paloalto, Simon Dominic, The Quiett	2019	63	Dingo x Damoim (Part 3)
"Run Damoim" (달려) with Deepflow, Paloalto, Simon Dominic, The Quiett	2020	54	Dingo x Damoim (Part 4)
(좋아한다니까)	2020	74	Non-album single

== Filmography ==
=== Television ===
Year	Title	Role
2021	High School Rapper 4	Mentor
2021	Show Me the Money 10	Producer

== Awards and nominations ==
Year	Award	Category	Nominated work	Result	Ref.
2020	Korean Hip-hop Awards	Artist of the Year	—N/a	Won	
2020	Korean Hip-hop Awards	Collaboration of the Year	"I'mma Do" with Deepflow, Paloalto, Simon Dominic, The Quiett	Won	
2020	Korean Hip-hop Awards	Hip Hop Track of the Year	"Don't Call Me"	Nominated	
2020	Korean Music Awards	Best Hip Hop Song	"Don't Call Me"	Nominated	
