= Hash Swan =

South Korean rapper (born 1995)

- Born: Han Deok-kwang; 12 March 1995 (age 30); Seoul, South Korea
- Genres: Hip hop
- Occupation: Rapper
- Instrument: Vocals
- Years active: 2016–present
- Labels: Ambition Musik

Korean name
- Hangul: 한덕광
- Hanja: 韓悳光
- RR: Han Deokgwang
- MR: Han Tŏkkwang

Han Deok-kwang (Korean: 한덕광; born 12 March 1995), better known by his stage name Hash Swan (해쉬스완) is a South Korean rapper. He was a contestant on Show Me the Money 5 and Show Me the Money 6. He released his first EP, Hash X Kash, on 28 September 2016.

== Discography ==
=== Extended plays ===
Title	Album details	Peak chart positions	Sales
Title	Album details	KOR	Sales
Hash X Kash	Released: 28 September 2016; Label: Holmes Records, LOEN Entertainment; Formats: CD, digital download	—	—N/a
Shangri-La	Released: 23 February 2017; Label: Ambition Musik, CJ E&M; Formats: CD, digital download	—	—N/a
Alexandrite	Released: 21 February 2018; Label: Ambition Musik, CJ E&M; Formats: CD, digital download	38	KOR: 1,043
Peridot	Released: 29 March 2019; Label: Ambition Musik, Stone Music Entertainment; Formats: CD, digital download	—	—N/a
"—" denotes releases that did not chart.

=== Singles ===
Title	Year	Peak chart positions	Sales (DL)	Album
Title	Year	KOR	Sales (DL)	Album
As lead artist
"Vacation"	2016	—	—N/a	Hash X Kash
"Daily Look" feat. Silly Boot	2017	—	—N/a	Shangri-La
"I Like Girls" (난여자가너무좋아) feat. Silly Boot	2017	—	—N/a	Shangri-La
"Ma$himaro"	2017	—	—N/a	Non-album single
"Wang Like Alexander" (알렉산더처럼 왕)	2018	—	—N/a	Alexandrite
"Arrow" Feat. Skinny Brown	2019	—	—N/a	Peridot
"High Beam" Feat. Swervy	2019	—	—N/a	Peridot
Collaborations
"Dokkaebi" (도깨비) with Flowsik, Hash Swan, Boi B & ₩uNo	2016	25	KOR: 120,785	Show Me the Money 5
"Ay" with DKash feat. Silly Boot	2016	—	—N/a	Non-album single
"Yozm Gang" (요즘것들) with Hangzoo, Young B, Killagramz feat. Zico, Dean	2017	5	KOR: 562,203	Show Me the Money 6
"S.M.T.M (Show Me The Money)" with Sleepy, Olltii, Penomeco, Punchnello, Black Nine, Dok2, Ignito	2017	82	KOR: 45,420	Show Me the Money 6
"No Switchin' Sides" with Dok2, The Quiett, Kim Hyo-eun, Changmo	2017	—	—N/a	Non-album single
"BAND" with Changmo, Ash Island, Keem Hyo-eun	2019	30	—N/a*	Non-album single
"Beer" (비워) with Changmo, Ash Island, Keem Hyo-eun, Leellamarz, The Quiett	2019	43	—N/a*	Non-album single
"—" denotes releases that did not chart. * Gaon stopped releasing download sales numbers in January 2018.
