= Kid Milli =

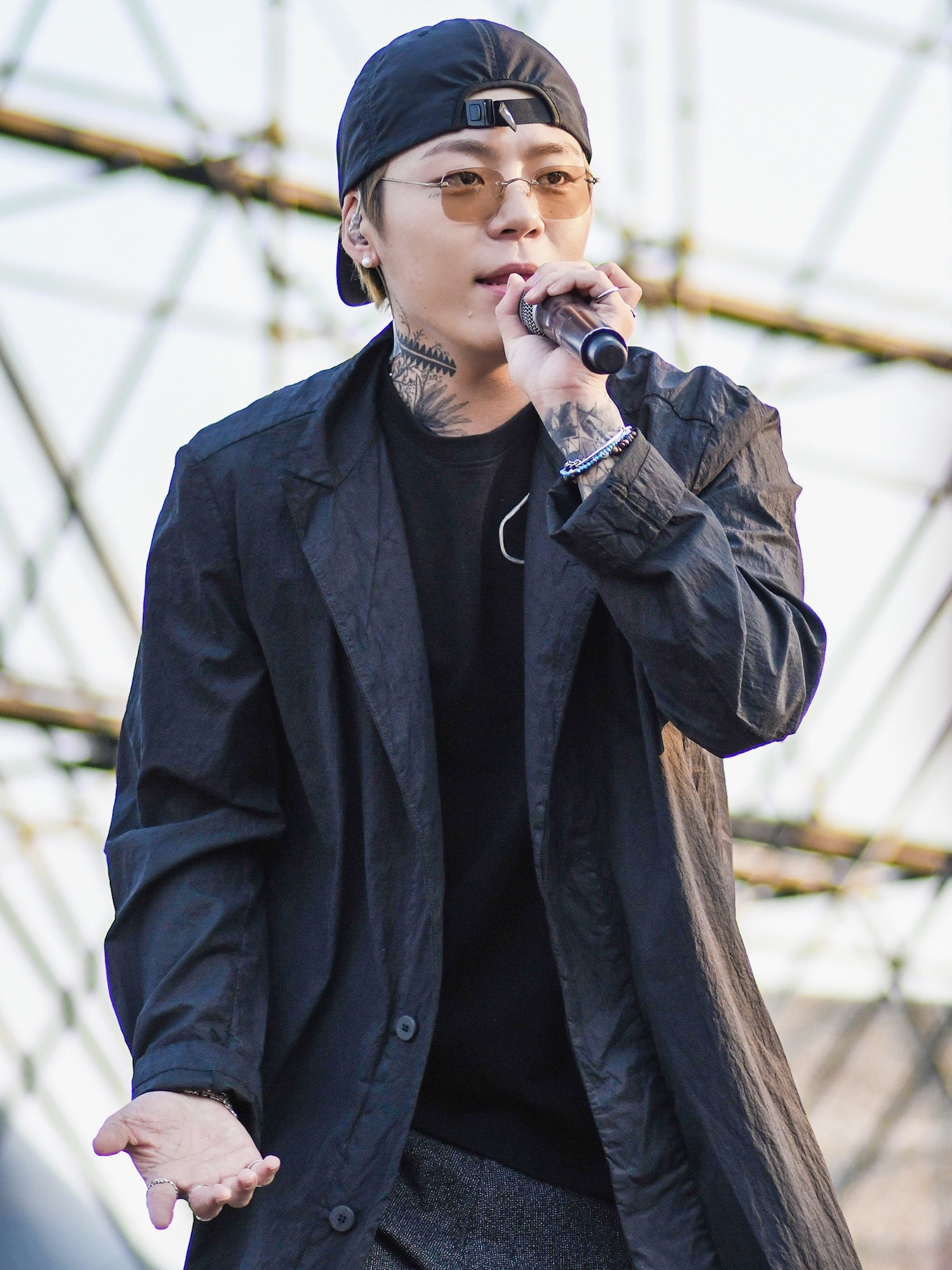
- Kid Milli at The Cry Ground Festival, May 2022

Background information
- Born: Choi Won-jae; October 26, 1993 (age 33); Yeoui-dong, Yeongdeungpo-gu, Seoul, South Korea
- Genre: Hip hop
- Occupation: Rapper
- Instrument: Vocals
- Years active: 2016–present
- Label: Indigo Music
- Member of: WYBH, COZYBOYS
- Website: indigomusic3.com

Korean name
- Hangul: 최원재
- RR: Choe Wonjae
- MR: Ch'oe Wŏnjae

Choi Won-jae (Korean: 최원재, born October 26, 1993), better known by his stage name Kid Milli (Korean: 키드밀리), is a South Korean rapper. He released his first extended play, Maiden Voyage, on February 23, 2017, and gained further recognition after finishing as the second runner-up in Show Me the Money Season 777.

== Early life and education ==
Choi Won-jae was born on October 26, 1993 in Yeoui-dong, a neighborhood in the Yeongdeungpo district of Seoul, South Korea. His mother previously ran an entertainment company, which shut down after it went bankrupt. Choi's parents are divorced, and his two older sisters have passed away. One of his sisters died in a car accident, and another committed suicide. To support his mother, Choi began to work from a young age.

Choi graduated from Pungmu Middle School, and dropped out of Pungmu High School to become a rapper and make music. He attended an academy to study for the High School Diploma Qualification Exam, a Korean equivalent of the GED, and earned his diploma after passing the test.

== Career ==
Before becoming a rapper, Kid Milli was a professional StarCraft player.

He was a mentor on High School Rapper Season 3.

He was also a mentor in Show me the Money Season 8.

== Discography ==
=== Studio albums ===
Title	Album details	Peak chart positions	Sales
Title	Album details	KOR	Sales
AI, The Playlist	Released: March 10, 2018; Label: Indigo; Formats: CD, digital download	49	KOR: 2,420
Beige 0.5	Released: April 17, 2020; Label: Indigo; Formats: CD, digital download	32	KOR: 2,549
Cliché (with Dress)	Released: April 27, 2021; Label: Indigo, Highline; Formats: CD, digital download	34	KOR: 4,256
Beige	Released: May 30, 2023; Label: Indigo; Formats: CD, digital download	26	KOR: 5,265
Rad Milli (with Rad Museum)	Released: August 20, 2024; Label: Indigo, you.will.knovv; Formats: CD, digital download	42	KOR: 2,300

=== Extended plays ===
Title	Album details	Peak chart positions	Sales
Title	Album details	KOR	Sales
Maiden Voyage	Released: February 23, 2017; Label: Cozyboys; Formats: Digital download	—	—
Maiden Voyage II	Released: August 5, 2017; Label: Indigo; Formats: Digital download	—	—
Imnotspecial	Released: May 9, 2018; Label: Indigo; Formats: Digital download	—	—
Maiden Voyage III	Released: November 17, 2018; Label: Indigo; Formats: Digital download	—	—
L I F E	Released: March 14, 2019; Label: Indigo; Formats: Digital download	—	—
+ (with Big Naughty)	Released: October 10, 2024; Label: H1ghr Music, Indigo; Formats: CD, digital download, streaming	46	KOR: 1,967
"—" denotes album did not chart.

=== Singles ===
Title	Year	Peak chart positions		Album
Title	Year	KOR		Album
Title	Year	Circle	Hot	Album
As lead artist
"Change" (feat. Gray)	2018	27	44	Show Me the Money 777 Episode 4
"Momm" (feat. Justhis)	2018	54	64	Show Me the Money 777 Semi-final
Collaborations
"IndiGO" (with Justhis, No:el, Young B)	2018	17	20	IM
"Flex" (with Giriboy, No:el, Swings)	2018	11	12	Non-album single
"Good Day" (with PH-1, Loopy)	2018	4	5	Show Me the Money 777 Episode 1
"119" (with Nafla, PH-1, OLNL, Loopy, Superbee)	2018	46	63	Show Me the Money 777 Episode 4

== Awards and nominations ==
=== Berlin Music Video Awards ===
The Berlin Music Video Awards is an international festival that promotes the art of music videos.

Year	Nominated work	Award	Result	Ref.
2026	"Damn I Flex"	Best Editor	Nominated	
