= Justhis =

South Korean rapper (born 1991)

Justhis 저스디스
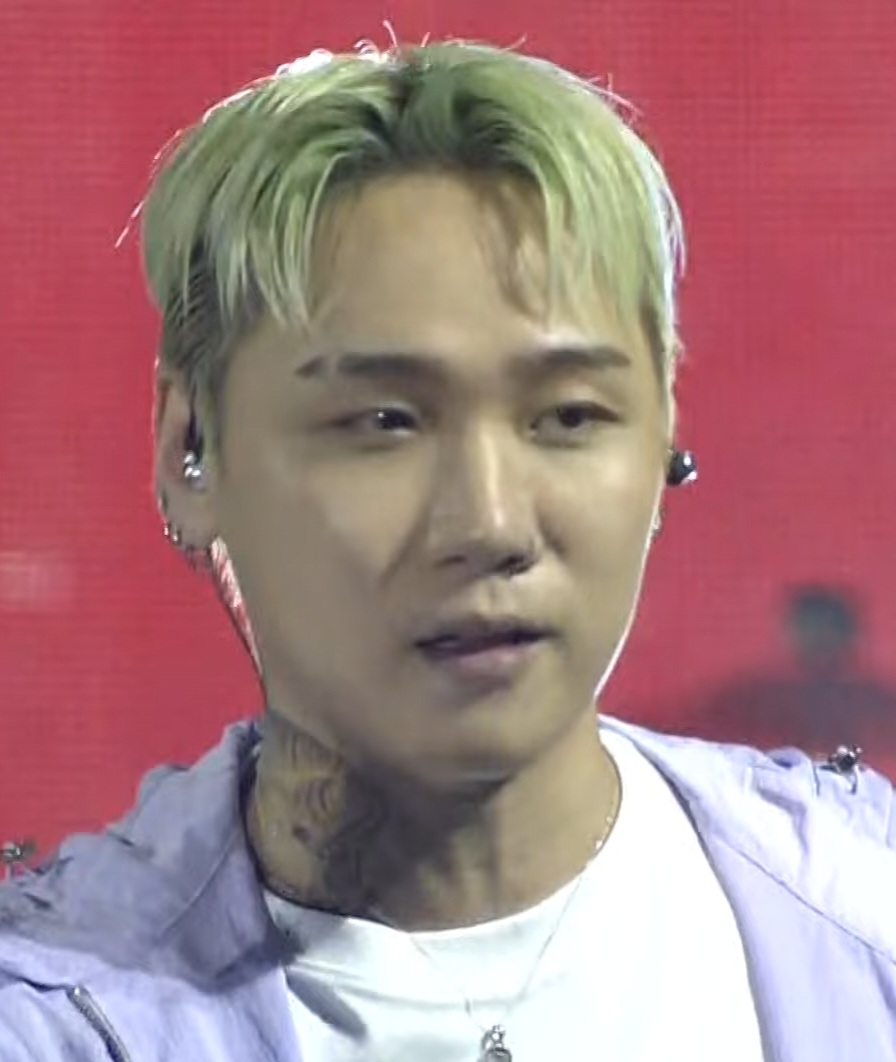

Background information
- Born: Heo Seung; May 7, 1991 (age 34); Seoul, South Korea
- Genres: Hip-hop
- Occupation: Rapper
- Instrument: Vocals
- Years active: 2015–present
- Label: All Caps

Korean name
- Hangul: 허승
- RR: Heo Seung
- MR: Hŏ Sŭng

Heo Seung (Korean: 허승, born May 7, 1991), better known by his stage name Justhis (Korean: 저스디스), is a South Korean rapper. He released his first album, 2 Many Homes 4 1 Kid, on June 14, 2016. He is a member of the Korean hip hop crew IMJMWDP. After departing from GROOVL1N in November 2025, he continued his activities independently through All Caps Entertainment, a label he founded himself. The company was established on June 9, 2022, with its business registration formally reported on April 23, 2024.

== Discography ==
=== Studio albums ===
Title	Album details	Peak chart positions	Sales
Title	Album details	KOR	Sales
2 Many Homes 4 1 Kid	Released: June 14, 2016; Label: Kakao M; Formats: CD, digital download	27	KOR: 1,654
Lit	Released: November 20, 2025; Label: All Caps; Formats: CD, digital download	30	KOR: 3,418

=== Instrumental/Remix albums ===
Title	Album details	Peak chart positions	Sales
Title	Album details	Gaon	Sales
2 Many Houses 4 1 Kid : Instrumentals & Remixes	Released: August 17, 2017; Label: Kakao M; Formats: CD, digital download	40	—N/a

=== Collaborative albums ===
Title	Album details	Peak chart positions	Sales
Title	Album details	Gaon	Sales
4 The Youth with Paloalto	Released: March 7, 2018; Label: Hi-Lite Records, Genie Music, Stone Music Entertainment; Formats: CD, digital download	31	KOR: 1,541
4 the Youth Freestyle & Remixes with Paloalto	Released: March 28, 2020; Label: Hi-Lite Records, Interpark; Formats: digital download	—	—N/a

=== Charted singles ===
Title	Year	Peak chart positions		Album
Title	Year	KOR		Album
Title	Year	Circle Digital	Kpop Hot 100	Album
As lead artist
"Star"	2021	— (Note: "Star" did not enter the Gaon Digital Chart, but appeared at number 112 on the component Gaon Download Chart.)	—	Do Not Go Gentle Into That Good Night
Collaborations
"IndiGO" with Kid Milli, No:el and Young B	2018	17	20	IM
"MOMM (Prod. Code Kunst)" Kid Milli feat. JUSTHIS	2018	54	—	Show Me the Money 777 Semi Final
"IMJMWDP (Prod. By Giriboy)" with Giriboy, NO:EL, Black Nut, Young B, Osshun Gum, YUNHWAY, Jvcki Wai, Kid Milli, Han Yo-han & Swings	2019	152	—	Non-album single
"Diablo" EK feat. JUSTHIS	2019	186	—	Show Me the Money 8 Episode 4
"Trash" (쓰레기) with Kid Milli, Young B & Swings	2019	183	—	Non-album single
"VVS (Prod. GroovyRoom)" Mirani, MUNCHMAN, Khundi Panda, MUSHVENOM Feat. JUSTHIS	2020	1	2	Show Me the Money 9 Episode 1
"The Roots (Prod. GroovyRoom)" (뿌리) Khundi Panda feat. Justhis	2020	11	—	Show Me the Money 9 Episode 3
"Hero (Prod. GroovyRoom)" Khundi Panda feat. Justhis, Golden	2020	67	—	Show Me the Money 9 Semi Final
"The Beauty of Void (Prod. GroovyRoom)" (여백의 미) Mushvenom feat. Jessi, Justhis	2020	32	—	Show Me the Money 9 Final
"Take It (Prod. GroovyRoom)" (옜다) with Mushvenom	2021	74 (Note: the b-sides "VVS (H1GHR Remix) (pH-1, Big Naughty, TRADE L, Woodie Gochild, Jay Park, Kidd King Feat. JUSTHIS) (Prod. GroovyRoom)" and "Achoo Remix (with GroovyRoom Feat. Mirani, pH-1, Munchman, Skinny Brown, Louie, Leellamarz, Ourealgoat, Dbo, Sik-K, Owen, Kid Milli, Swings, Nudeboi Seo, TRADE L, Coogie, Blase, sokodomo, Khundi Panda, Lil Moshpit, Khakii)" appeared as number 108 and 109 on Gaon Digital Chart, respectively.)	—	Salted Oyster (G+Jus)
"4 the Youth Freestyle" with Paloalto	2021	— (Note: "4 the Youth Freestyle" did not enter the Gaon Digital Chart, but appeared at number 114 on the component Gaon Download Chart, with the b-sides "잠궈 (Lock Up) Remix (feat. Swervy, Kid Milli, DON MALIK & Reddy)" and "Wayne Remix (feat. G2, Huckleberry P & P-TYPE)" appearing as number 185 and 184 on Download charts, respectively.)	—	4 the Youth Freestyle & Remixes
"Not Like You" (너랑 달라) with Hanlim Gym & Han Yo-han	2021	— (Note: "Not Like You" did not enter the Gaon Digital Chart, but appeared at number 86 on the component Gaon Download Chart.)	—	Non-album single
"Thorn" (Prod. Code Kunst) (가시) with Gwangil Jo and Gaeko	2021	183	—	Show Me the Money 10 Episode 2
"Sun Goes Down" (Prod. R. Tee) with R. Tee	2022	123	—	Non-album single

== Filmography ==
=== Television show ===
Year	Title	Role	Notes	Ref.
2020	Show Me the Money 9	Producer	with GroovyRoom	
2022	Show Me the Money 11	Producer	with R. Tee	
