= Noel (rapper) =

South Korean rapper (born 2000)

NO:EL 장용준
- Born: Jang Yong-jun; May 30, 2000 (age 25); South Korea
- Genres: Hip hop
- Occupation: Rapper
- Instrument: Vocals
- Years active: 2017–present
- Labels: Indigo Music
- Website: indigomusic3.com

Korean name
- Hangul: 장용준
- RR: Jang Yongjun
- MR: Chang Yongjun

Jang Yong-jun (Korean: 장용준, born May 30, 2000), better known by his stage name NO:EL (노엘), is a South Korean rapper. He released his first album, Elleonoel, on September 2, 2017.

He is also a son of Chang Je-won, an incumbent Member of the National Assembly from the United Future Party.

On September 7, 2019, he drove under the influence of alcohol. He later received a suspended sentence for drunk driving and attempting to cover it up.

On September 25, 2020, NO:EL ended his contract with Indigo Music.

On April 29, 2021, NO:EL released an EP entitled 21'S/S.

== Discography ==
=== Studio albums ===
Title	Album details	Peak chart positions	Sales
Title	Album details	KOR	Sales
Elleonoel	Released: September 2, 2017; Label: Prima Music Group, Kakao M; Formats: CD, digital download	—	—N/a
Doubleonoel	Released: July 17, 2018; Label: Indigo Music, Kakao M; Formats: CD, digital download	36	KOR: 1,150
21'S/S	Released: April 29, 2021; Label: Glitched Company; Formats: CD, digital download	—	1.463
AREA:4	Released: June 12, 2024; Label: Indigo Music, Kakao M; Formats: CD, digital download	77	KOR: 1,305

=== Extended plays ===
Title	Album details	Peak chart positions	Sales
Title	Album details	Gaon	Sales
18'S/S	Released: April 10, 2018; Label: Indigo Music, Kakao M; Formats: CD, digital download	—	—N/a
18'F/W	Released: November 10, 2018; Label: Indigo Music, Kakao M; Formats: CD, digital download	—	—N/a

=== Charted singles ===
Title	Year	Peak chart positions		Album
Title	Year	KOR		Album
Title	Year	Gaon Digital	Billboard Hot	Album
Collaborations
"IndiGO" with Justhis, Kid Milli, Young B	2018	17	20	IM
"Flex" with Giriboy, Kid Milli, Swings	2018	11	12	Non-album single
