= Show Me the Money discography =

- Compilation albums: 2

Show Me the Money (SMTM; Korean: 쇼미더머니) is a South Korean rap competition TV show that airs on Mnet. The show has thus far released two compilation albums.

== Compilation albums ==
Title	Album details	Peak chart positions	Sales
Title	Album details	KOR	Sales
Show Me the Money	Released: August 11, 2012; Label: CJ E&M; Format: CD, digital download	75	—N/a
Show Me the Money 6 Special	Released: September 16, 2017; Label: CJ E&M; Format: CD, digital download	—	—N/a

== Show Me the Money ==
Title	Year	Contestant(s)	Peak chart positions	Sales (DL)
Title	Year	Contestant(s)	KOR	Sales (DL)
"In the Air" feat. Giyu	2012	Hoony Hoon	—	—N/a
"Storm" feat. Swings, Kanto	2012	Verbal Jint	—	—N/a
"14 Round" feat. Egobomb, Quartz	2012	MC Sniper	—	—N/a
"Headbutt" (박치기)	2012	45RPM, Illtong	—	—N/a
"The Last Supper" (최후의 만찬)	2012	Joosuc, Kim Jeong-hoon	—	—N/a
"Home" feat. Jinsil	2012	Double K, Loco	35	KOR: 140,391
"I Loved You" (사랑했잖아) Live ver. feat. Loco, Son Seung-yeon	2012	MC Sniper	60	KOR: 44,711
"Sunset Glow" (붉은 노을) feat. Kim Ji-soo, Egobomb	2012	MC Sniper	65	KOR: 52,542

== Show Me the Money 2 ==
Title	Year	Contestant(s)	Peak chart positions	Sales (DL)
Title	Year	Contestant(s)	KOR	Sales (DL)
"Heaven" feat. Oh Su-min	2013	J'Kyun	98	KOR: 22,198
"Please Wait" (기다려줘) feat. Lee Seong-su	2013	Soul Dive, Wutan	—	—N/a
"Like That"	2013	Zizo	57	KOR: 36,576
"Missing"	2013	Soul Dive	—	—N/a

== Show Me the Money 3 ==
Title	Year	Contestant(s)	Peak chart positions	Sales (DL)
Title	Year	Contestant(s)	KOR	Sales (DL)
"Show Me the Money"	2014	Lee Hyun-do, Soul Dive, Swings, DinDin, Joosuc, Loco, Jin Doggae	—	—N/a
"Oll' Ready"	2014	Olltii	23	KOR: 197,802
"Ulleri" (얼레리)	2014	Yuk Ji-dam	63	KOR: 52,645
"Be I"	2014	B.I	5	KOR: 426,413
"I Am"	2014	Iron	31	KOR: 218,369
"Go" (가)	2014	Bobby	16	KOR: 301,126
"Guerrilla's Way"	2014	Vasco	74	KOR: 47,822
"L4L (Lookin' For Luv)" feat. Dok2, The Quiett	2014	Bobby	7	KOR: 400,775
"That XX" (그 XX) feat. Zico	2014	Olltii	32	KOR: 192,078
"187" feat. Im Sung-hyun	2014	Vasco	54	KOR: 96,207
"YGGR#Hip Hop" (연결고리#힙합)	2014	Bobby	4	KOR: 684,994
"Good Day" feat. Swings	2014	C Jamm	—	KOR: 17,030
"Shit"	2014	C Jamm	—	KOR: 20,526
"Malice" (독기)	2014	Iron	2	KOR: 671,664
"Raise Your Guard And Bounce" (가드올리고 Bounce)	2014	Bobby	4	KOR: 543,442
"Unfinished Story" (못다한 이야기) feat. Kim Na-young	2014	Vasco	—	KOR: 35,224

== Show Me the Money 4 ==
Title	Year	Contestant(s)	Peak chart positions	Sales (DL)
Title	Year	Contestant(s)	KOR	Sales (DL)
"Respect" feat. Loco, Gray, DJ Pumkin	2015	Sik-K, Lil Boi, Geegooin	6	KOR: 411,916
"OG (Be Original)"	2015	Innovator, Incredivle, Superbee	91	KOR: 37,564
"My Zone" feat. San E, Verbal Jint	2015	Basick, Blacknut, Microdot	12	KOR: 288,194
"Turtle Ship" (거북선) feat. Paloalto	2015	Ja Mezz, AndUp, Song Min-ho	4	KOR: 813,526
"Moneyflow" (다 비켜봐)	2015	Song Min-ho, Zico, Paloalto	7	KOR: 362,442
"On It + Bo$$"	2015	Lil Boi, Loco, Jay Park	11	KOR: 292,163
"Gxnzi" feat. Vasco	2015	Basick	39	KOR: 117,038
"More Than a TV Star" feat. Lee Hi	2015	Innovator	47	KOR: 104,797
"M.I.L.E. (Make It Look Easy)"	2015	Blacknut, Verbal Jint, San E	22	KOR: 168,313
"Oppa's Car" (오빠차)	2015	Incredivle, Tablo, Jinusean	1	KOR: 864,877
"Fear" (겁) feat. Taeyang	2015	Song Min-ho	3	KOR: 1,049,930
"What Can I Do" (내가 할 수 있는 건) feat. Jessi	2015	Blacknut	12	KOR: 339,052
"Stand Up" feat. Mamamoo	2015	Basick	21	KOR: 255,492
"Okey Dokey"	2015	Song Min-ho, Zico	9	KOR: 659,353
"Better Days" (좋은 날) feat. Gummy	2015	Basick	26	KOR: 182,172
"Victim + Poppin Bottles" (Victim + 위하여) feat. B-Free, Paloalto	2015	Song Min-ho	51	KOR: 62,474
"I'm The Man"	2015	Basick, Verbal Jint, San E	97	KOR: 38,267
"Next Level"	2015	One, Hanhae, Geegooin, P-Type	—	—N/a

== Show Me the Money 5 ==
Title	Year	Contestant(s)	Peak chart positions	Sales (DL)
Title	Year	Contestant(s)	KOR	Sales (DL)
"I'm Not the Person You Used to Know" (니가 알던 내가 아냐)	2016	Simon Dominic, One, G2, BewhY	2	KOR: 751,667
"Air DoTheQ" (공중도덕)	2016	The Quiett, Superbee, myunDo, Flowsik, Dok2	5	KOR: 455,171
"$insa" (신사)	2016	Zion.T, C Jamm, Reddy, Xitsuh	4	KOR: 493,535
"Rose of Sharon" (무궁화)	2016	Mad Clown, Donutman, Boi B, #Gun	12	KOR: 244,242
"Going Home" (비행소년) feat. Gummy	2016	Mad Clown, #Gun	6	KOR: 433,732
"Comfortable" (맘 편히)	2016	Simon Dominic, Gray, One	1	KOR: 750,349
"Knock" (쿵)	2016	Zion.T	2	KOR: 474,535
"Machine Gun" feat. Mino	2016	Kush, Zion.T	10	KOR: 339,523
"Wanted" (현상수배)	2016	C Jamm, Reddy	13	KOR: 309,144
"Beverly 1lls"	2016	Superbee, myunDo	37	KOR: 179,353
"Rapstar (remix)"	2016	Flowsik, The Quiett, Dok2	46	KOR: 171,917
"Drummer" (드러머) feat. Olltii	2016	Zion.T, Xitsuh	17	KOR: 295,940
"Forever"	2016	BewhY	2	KOR: 918,132
"Swallowtail" (호랑나비) feat. Gill, Rhythm Power, Kim Heung-gook	2016	Boi B	5	KOR: 720,563
"Crazy Guy" (미친놈) feat. Jessi	2016	#Gun	5	KOR: 436,901
"Beautiful" (아름다워) feat. Zico	2016	C Jamm	8	KOR: 314,516
"And" (끝) feat. Suran	2016	Xitsuh	61	KOR: 84,813
"Sun Block" (썬 블락) feat. Microdot	2016	Superbee	42	KOR: 106,212
"Day Day" feat. Jay Park	2016	BewhY	2	KOR: 1,039,009
"Like This" feat. Bobby	2016	Reddy	20	KOR: 153,945
"Air DoTheQ part 2" (공중도덕 part 2)	2016	The Quiett, Dok2, Superbee	67	KOR: 69,698
"MM"	2016	C Jamm	92	KOR: 53,941
"XamBaqJa" (쌈박자)	2016	BewhY, Simon Dominic	29	KOR: 110,830
"Let It Be" (재방송) feat. Crush	2016	C Jamm	51	KOR: 93,256
"Fake" (자화상 part 2)	2016	BewhY	39	KOR: 107,437
"Goblin" (도깨비)	2016	Flowsik, Hash Swan, Boi B, ₩uNo, G2	25	KOR: 120,785
"Bad Blood" (나쁜 피)	2016	Mad Clown	—	KOR: 27,111

== Show Me the Money 6 ==
Title	Year	Contestant(s)	Peak chart positions	Sales (DL)
Title	Year	Contestant(s)	KOR	Sales (DL)
"1/N" (N분의 1) feat. Dynamic Duo	2017	Hanhae, Ryno, Nucksal, Jo Woo-chan	3	KOR: 750,050
"Chopstick" (젓가락) feat. Tiger JK, Bizzy, Ann One	2017	Maniac, Black Nine, Asol, Woo Won-jae	34	KOR: 134,376
"Life Is Gamble" (도박) feat. Jay Park, Dok2	2017	Ja Mezz, Ness, Woodie Go Child, Junoflo	19	KOR: 201,301
"Yozm Gang" (요즘것들) feat. Zico, Dean	2017	Young B, Hash Swan, Killagramz, Hangzoo	5	KOR: 612,987
"Where U At" (어디) feat. Zico, Dean	2017	Killagramz	8	KOR: 265,774
"Lobby" (로비로 모여) feat. Dynamic Duo, Chungha, Muzie	2017	Hanhae	25	KOR: 109,704
"Killin It" feat. Koonta, Babylon	2017	Maniac	—	KOR: 15,618
"Eyes On Me" feat. G.Soul, Dok2	2017	Junoflo	58	KOR: 51,644
"Birthday" feat. Jay Park, Dok2	2017	Ja Mezz	45	KOR: 56,414
"T.O" (또) feat. Tiger JK, Bizzy, Mrshll	2017	Woo Won-jae	13	KOR: 222,434
"Search" feat. Car, the garden, Zico	2017	Hangzoo, Young B	11	KOR: 240,175
"Brrr Get$" (부르는 게 값이야) feat. Gaeko, Don Mills	2017	Nucksal, Jo Woo-chan	8	KOR: 174,664
"VVIP" feat. Sik-K, Gaeko	2017	Jo Woo-chan	43	KOR: 88,925
"Zinza" (진자) feat. YDG, Suran	2017	Woo Won-jae	33	KOR: 109,033
"One Sun" feat. Shin Yong-jae, Gaeko	2017	Hanhae	98	KOR: 42,628
"Red Sun" feat. Zico, Swings	2017	Hangzoo	3	KOR: 410,643
"Twisted" (비틀어) feat. Kim Hyo-eun, Changmo	2017	Junoflo	30	KOR: 89,106
"Filament" (필라멘트) feat. Kim Bum-soo	2017	Nucksal	6	KOR: 254,964
"Three Kings" (천상꾼) feat. Dynamic Duo, DJ Friz	2017	Nucksal	58	KOR: 53,643
"Bestdriverz" feat. Dean, Zion.T	2017	Hangzoo	56	KOR: 56,332
"Move" feat. Bizzy	2017	Woo Won-jae	16	KOR: 169,487
"Feelin Good" (막이 내려도) feat. Gaeko	2017	Nucksal	79	KOR: 47,597
"Turn Around" (돌리고) feat. DJ Doc	2017	Hangzoo	91	KOR: 40,954
"S.M.T.M (Show Me The Money)"	2017	Sleepy, Hash Swan, Olltii, Black Nine, Punchnello, Penomeco, Ignito	82	KOR: 45,420
"A Coin Pt.2 (Remix)" (동전한닢 Pt.2 (Remix))	2017	Show Me the Money 6 Top 20: Nucksal; Jo Woo-chan; Ryno; Hanhae; Myundo; Maniac; Black Nine; Asol; Woo Won-jae; P-Type; Junoflo; Ja Mezz; Ness; Woodie Gochild; Double K; Hangzoo; Killagramz; Hash Swan; Young B; Olltii	—	—N/a
"Last Man Smiling" (빛이훨씬더커)	2017	Dynamic Duo	—	—N/a

== Show Me the Money 777 ==
Title	Year	Contestant(s)	Peak chart positions
Title	Year	Contestant(s)	KOR
"SaimSaim" (사임사임) feat. Changmo	2018	Coogie, Superbee, D.Ark	7
"SF Skills" (공상과학기술) feat. Giriboy, Swings	2018	Nafla, OLNL, ODEE	28
"PAE" (패) feat. Nucksal, Deepflow	2018	Keem Hyo-eun, Chaboom, EK	37
"Good Day" (Prod. Code Kunst) feat. Paloalto	2018	pH-1, Kid Milli, Loopy	4
"Hate You" (Prod. Code Kunst) feat. Woo Won-jae	2018	pH-1	19
"Breaking Bad" (브레이킹배드) feat. Giriboy	2018	OLNL	59
"Watch Me Ballin'" (빌어먹을 인연) feat. Sik-K	2018	Coogie	72
"XXL" feat. Deepflow, Dok2	2018	Keem Hyo-eun	65
"Bite" (물어)	2018	Nafla	34
"When the Time Comes" (죽어도 좋아) feat. Sunwoo Jung-a, Nucksal	2018	Chaboom	—
"Save" (Prod. Code Kunst) feat. Paloalto	2018	Loopy	8
"Uck" (억) (Prod. Changmo) feat. Changmo	2018	Superbee	31
"Airplane Mode" (에어플레인모드) feat. Swings	2018	ODEE	—
"Change" (Prod. Code Kunst) feat. GRAY	2018	Kid Milli	27
"God God God"	2018	EK	69
"119" (Prod. GRAY)	2018	Show Me the Money; 777 Top 6: Nafla; pH-1; Kid Milli; OLNL; Loopy; Superbee	46
"MOMM" (Prod. Code Kunst) feat. JUSTHIS	2018	Kid Milli	54
"i" (Prod. Giriboy) feat. Samuel Seo	2018	OLNL	—
"SUPERBEEwhY" (수퍼비와) (Prod. BewhY) feat. BewhY	2018	Superbee	12
"NoNo" (Prod. Code Kunst) feat. Simon Dominic	2018	Loopy	18
"Orange" (주황색) (Prod. Code Kunst) feat. Jay Park	2018	pH-1	56
"Sunbbang" (선빵) (Prod. Giriboy) feat. Gaeko, Giriboy	2018	Nafla	89
"Boss Thang" (Prod. Code Kunst) feat. Young B	2018	Kid Milli	—
"Robot Love" (Prod. Code Kunst)	2018	Loopy	—
"Buckle" (버클) (Prod. Giriboy) feat. Zico	2018	Nafla	—
"Goals" (Prod. Code Kunst) feat. Paloalto, Hoody	2018	Kid Milli	—
"V" (Prod. Giriboy) feat. Loco	2018	Loopy	—
"Pickup Man" (픽업맨) feat. Swings, Giriboy	2018	Nafla	—
"Guys" (자식들) (Prod. The Quiett)	2018	EK, ODEE, Zene The Zilla, Coogie	—

== Show Me the Money 8 ==
Title	Year	Contestant(s)	Peak chart positions
Title	Year	Contestant(s)	KOR
"Not Enough" (담아) (Prod. BOYCOLD) feat. YUMDDA, pH-1	2019	Swings, Kid Milli, Mad Clown	37
"Yoran" (요란) (Prod. Millic)	2019	Verbal Jint, Giriboy, BewhY	—
"Bada" (바다) (Prod. Giriboy) feat. Giriboy	2019	Woodie Gochild, CHOILB, Seo Dong-hyun, Young B, Chillin Homie	48
"Scoop" (덜어) (Prod. BOYCOLD) feat. Kid Milli, Swings	2019	YunB, Kim Seung-min, Yunhway, Donutman	73
"BAMN" (Prod. millic)	2019	Punchnello, Jjangyou, Zene The Zilla, Mckdaddy	77
"00" (땡땡) (Prod. BOYCOLD)	2019	Lil Tachi, Takuwa, Bryn, EK	86
"Truman Show" (트루먼 쇼)	2019	YunB, Young B	60
"Pung" (개성시대)	2019	Woodie Gochild, Takuwa	—
"24/7" (연중무휴)	2019	Zene The Zilla, EK	—
"Sangsu" (상수)	2019	CHOILB, Kim Seung-min	—
"Comfortable" (편해)	2019	Punchnello, Donutman	—
"CCTV" feat. Leellamarz	2019	Lil Tachi, Seo Dong-hyun	180
"Bonnie & Clyde"	2019	Bryn, Mckdaddy	—
"Gwangalli 101" (광안리101)	2019	Jjangyou, Yunhway	119
"Cupid" (Prod. sAewoo) feat. Park Ji-min	2019	Bryn	—
"Problems" (문제) feat. Coogie	2019	Seo Dong-hyun	82
"When It Rains" (비가 와) (Prod. illusionsound1, Verbal Jint) feat. Suran	2019	Choilb	—
"Sold Out" (Prod. Doplamingo, Verbal Jint) feat. VINXEN	2019	Young B	99
"Magma" (Prod. BewhY) feat. Hangzoo, BewhY	2019	Punchnello	148
"Diablo" feat. JUSTHIS	2019	EK	186
"Alone" (혼자)	2019	Jjangyou	—
"Bibbidi Bobbidi Boo" (위로) (Prod. sAewoo) feat. Han Yo-han	2019	Takuwa	—
"Boy" (소년) (Prod. BewhY) feat. BewhY	2019	Young B	171
"010" (전화번호) feat. Giriboy	2019	Seo Dong-hyun	—
"Jungle" (정글) (Prod. millic) feat. Penomeco, Sam Kim	2019	Punchnello	—
"Far Away" (갈래) (Prod. sAewoo) feat. Swings, Kid Milli	2019	Takuwa	—
"No Cap" feat. Osshun Gum	2019	Young B	—
"Astronaut" (Prod. Oviz)	2019	Seo Dong-hyun	—
"Sorry" (미안해서 미안해) feat. Kwon Jeong-yeol of 10cm	2019	Punchnello	—
"Thank You" (기역시옷) feat. Paloalto	2019	Takuwa	—
"Icebreaker" (쇄빙선)	2019	Zizo, Layone, Livur	—
"Sick Teen" (급SICK) (Prod. Grene Man)	2019	M1NU, Layone, Veinifyl, Seo Dong-hyun	—
"Let It Burn" (Prod. The Quiett)	2019	Ahn Byung-woong, Chillin Homie, The Quiett	—

== Show Me the Money 9 ==
Title	Year	Contestant(s)	Peak chart positions
Title	Year	Contestant(s)	KOR
"G+Jus Freestyle" (Prod. GroovyRoom)	2020	Justhis	—
"Want It" (원해) (Prod. Code Kunst) feat. Paloalto	2020	Swings, Mckdaddy, Khakii, Layone	19
"Win Win" (윈윈) (Prod. Bewhy) feat. Gaeko, Bewhy	2020	Heo Sung-hyun, dsel, Kaogaii, Untell	40
"VVS" (Prod. GroovyRoom) feat. Justhis	2020	Mirani, Munchman, Khundi Panda, Mushvenom	1
"Freak" (Prod. SLOM)	2020	Lil Boi, Wonstein, Chillin Homie, Skyminhyuk	8
"Peter Pan" (피터팬) (Prod. Bewhy)	2020	Untell	—
"Upgrade 2020" (Prod. Code Kunst) feat. Paloalto	2020	Swings	110
"Bakchigi" (박치기) (Prod. Nutty) feat. Dynamic Duo	2020	Kaogaii	—
"Mask On" (Prod. Code Kunst) feat. Paloalto, Coogie	2020	Layone	164
"Achoo" (Prod. GroovyRoom) feat. pH-1, Haon	2020	Mirani	5
"Flashing" (번쩍) feat. Han Yo-han, OLNL	2020	Skyminhyuk	—
"The Roots" (뿌리) (Prod. GroovyRoom) feat. Justhis	2020	Khundi Panda	11
"Tomorrow" (내일이 오면) feat. Giriboy, Seo Dong-hyun	2020	Lil Boi	2
"Tricker" (부어라 비워라) (Prod. GroovyRoom)	2020	Mushvenom	29
"Infrared Camera" (적외선 카메라)	2020	Wonstein	16
"Grain" (결) feat. Dynamic Duo, Bewhy	2020	Untell	—
"Godok" (고독하구만) (Prod. GroovyRoom) feat. Superbee	2020	Mushvenom	21
"iii" (Prod. Code Kunst) feat. Basick, Kid Milli, Paloalto	2020	Layone	81
"No Bad Dogs" (세상에 나쁜 개는 없다) (Prod. SLOM) feat. Yang Dong-geun, Zion.T	2020	Wonstein	101
"Part Time" (Prod. GroovyRoom, BOYCOLD) feat. Queen WA$ABII	2020	Mirani	175
"Bad News Cypher vol. 2" (Prod. SLOM) feat. TakeOne	2020	Lil Boi	61
"Villain" (악역) (Prod. Code Kunst) feat. Lee Hi, Simon Dominic	2020	Swings	10
"Hero" (Prod. GroovyRoom) feat. Justhis, Golden	2020	Khundi Panda	67
"Go" (가다) (Prod. SLO) feat. Simon Dominic, The Quiett	2020	Mushvenom	42
"B Mine" (Prod. Code Kunst) feat. SUMIN	2020	Swings	169
"Daydreamin" (Prod. Yosi, Code Kunst) feat. Sogumm, Woo Won-jae	2020	Layone	114
"On Air" (Prod. Gray) feat. Loco, Jay Park, Gray	2020	Lil Boi	11
"The Beauty of Void" (여백의 미) (Prod. GroovyRoom) feat. Jessi, Justhis	2020	Mushvenom	32
"Still Hungry" (Prod. Code Kunst) feat. Mommy Son, Paloalto	2020	Swings	156
"Yay" (Prod. Code Kunst) feat. Lee Young-ji, Jamie, Paloalto	2020	Layone	93
"Credit" feat. Yumdda, Giriboy, Zion.T	2020	Lil Boi	8
"New New" (뉴뉴) (Prod. GroovyRoom, MISU)	2020	Ahn Byung-woong, Khakii, Mckdaddy, Munchman	—
"Y Earned" (연말이 되면) (Prod. Primary, plusNONE) feat. Gaeko, SOLE	2020	Rohann, Heo Sung-hyun, Lee Gi-wook, Khundi Panda, dsel	179

== Show Me the Money 10 ==
Title	Year	Contestant(s)	Peak chart positions
Title	Year	Contestant(s)	KOR
"Trouble" (Prod. Slom)	2021	Don Mills, Northfacegawd, Sokodomo, Khakii, A-Chess	7
"Memories of You and Me" (너와 나의 Memories) (Prod. Toil) feat. Yumdda	2021	Koonta, Basick, 365lit, Hwang Ji-sang, Song Min-young	9
"Wake Up" (Prod. Code Kunst) feat. Gaeko	2021	Ourealgoat, Since, Ahn Byeong-woong, Tabber, Jo Gwang-il	3
"Breathe" (쉬어) (Prod. Gray) feat. Mino	2021	Anandelight, Unofficialboy, Be'O, Geegooin, Mudd the Student	1
"Merry-Go-Round" (회전목마) (Prod. Slom) feat. Zion.T, Wonstein	2021	Sokodomo	1
"Thorn" (가시) (Prod. Code Kunst) feat. Gaeko, Justhis	2021	Jo Gwang-il	22
"Chameleon" (카멜레온) (Prod. SUMIN) feat. Dbo, Sumin	2021	Don Mills, Khakii	174
"Reset" (Prod. Code Kunst) feat. Gaeko, Kid Milli	2021	Since, Tabber	17
"Wot Wot" (모야모야) (Prod. Toil) feat. Queen Wa$abii	2021	Hwang Ji-sang, 365lit	173
"Press F5" (새로고침) (Prod. Gray) feat. Gray	2021	Geegooin, Anandelight	111
"Meeting Is Easy, Parting Is Hard" (만남은 쉽고 이별은 어려워) (Prod. Toil) feat. Leellamarz	2021	Basick	3
"Moss" (이끼) (Prod. Mino) feat. Bobby	2021	Mudd the Student	31
"Gganbu" (깐부) (Prod. Toil) feat. Yumdda, Ash Island	2021	Koonta	11
"Limousine" (리무진) (Prod. Gray) feat. Mino	2021	Be'O	1
"High" (높이) (Prod. Gray) feat. Lee Hi	2021	Anandelight	92
"Face Time" (Prod. Code Kunst) feat. Giriboy, ph-1	2021	Since	47
"Hopefully" (바래) (Prod. Toil) feat. Jung In	2021	Koonta	29
"Dissonance" (불협화음) (Prod. Gray) feat. AKMU	2021	Mudd the Student	4
"08Basick" (08베이식) feat. Yumdda, Punchnello	2021	Basick	22
"Waterbomb" (호우주의) (Prod. Code Kunst) feat. Gaeko, Nucksal	2021	Jo Gwang-il	14
"Be!" (Prod. Slom, Peejay) feat. Paloalto, Lil Boi	2021	Sokodomo	38
"MBTI" (Prod. Gray) feat. Coogie, Loco	2021	Be'O	6
"Double Up" feat. Yumdda, Layone, Mushvenom, The Quiett	2021	Koonta	171
"Without You" (네가 없는 밤) (Prod. Gray) feat. Ash Island	2021	Be'O	9
"Up" (UP해) (Prod. Code Kunst) feat. Woo Won-jae, Jay Park)	2021	Since	45
"Garion" (가리온) (Prod. Primary) feat. Dynamic Duo	2021	Jo Gwang-il	49
"Timing" (타이밍) (Prod. Toil) feat. Yumdda, Big Naughty	2021	Koonta	119
"Nothing" (지나고 보면) (Prod. Gray) feat. Mino, Hwasa	2021	Be'O	73
"Sign" (Prod. Code Kunst) feat. Mirani	2021	Since	69
"Journey" (쿠키영상) (Prod. Code Kunst) feat. Gaeko, Hangzoo, Ailee	2021	Jo Gwang-il	101
"A Long Day" (고생이 많아) (Prod. Fisherman) feat. Zion.T	2021	Basick, Anandelight, Mudd the Student, Sokodomo	169
"+82" (Prod. Dynamic Duo, THAMA)	2021	Dynamic Duo, Paloalto, Giriboy, Justhis, Lil Boi, DJ Wegun	153

== Show Me the Money 11 ==
Title	Year	Contestant(s)	Peak chart positions
Title	Year	Contestant(s)	KOR
"Sun Goes Down" (Prod. R. Tee)	2022	Justhis, R. Tee	123
"Receipts" (Prod. Slom)	2022	Jay Park, Slom	—
"Wow" (Prod. GroovyRoom)	2022	GroovyRoom, Lil Boi	—
"Be My"	2022	The Quiett, Leellamarz	—
"We Higher" (위하여) (Prod. GroovyRoom) feat. Lil Boi	2022	Blase, Roh Yun-ha, Polodared, Chillin Homie, Fleeky Bang	15
"Ajushi" (아저씨) feat. Leellamarz	2022	Crucial Star, QM, Kim Jae-wook, NSW Yoon, Damini	44
"We" (Prod. Slom) feat. Jay Park	2022	Lee Young-ji, Toigo, J'Kyun, Jambino, Xinsayne	19
"My Way" (마이웨이) (Prod. R. Tee) feat. Justhis	2022	Don Malik, Huh, Khan, Mckdaddy, Los	3
"Flick" (Prod. GroovyRoom) feat. Be'O, Haon	2022	Roh Yun-ha	53
"Come to My Stu" feat. Leellamarz	2022	QM	121
"Holiday" (Prod. GroovyRoom) feat. Lil Boi, Giriboy	2022	Blase	94
"Eri Eri" (으리으리) feat. Homies	2022	NSW Yoon	59
"Blue Check" (Prod. Slom) feat. Jay Park, Jessi	2022	Toigo	122
"Compass" (나침반) (Prod. R. Tee) feat. Uneducated Kid, Superbee	2022	Khan	33
"Bingo" (Prod. Slom) feat. meenoi, George	2022	Jambino	97
"Burn Up" (펄펄) (Prod. R. Tee) feat. Dynamic Duo	2022	Huh	109
"Not Sorry" (Prod. Slom) feat. pH-1	2022	Lee Young-ji	4
"Eye" (눈) (Prod. R. Tee) feat. Big Naughty, Justhis	2022	Don Malik	17
"Vroom" (Prod. GroovyRoom) feat. Lil Boi, Swings	2022	Roh Yun-ha	176
"Ugly Duckling" (미운 오리 새끼) (Prod. R. Tee) feat. Sunwoo Jung-a, Bobby	2022	Huh	20
"Name Tag" (Prod. GroovyRoom) feat. Sik-K, Coogie	2022	Blase	119
"Goblin" (도깨비) (Prod. R. Tee) feat. Homies	2022	Khan	136
"Ppak" (빡) (Prod. R. Tee) feat. Justhis, Paloalto	2022	Don Malik	44
"Like Water" feat. Loco, Hyuna	2022	Jambino	114
"Love" feat. Paul Blanco, Ash Island	2022	NSW Yoon	159
"Witch" (Prod. Slom) feat. Jay Park, So!YOon!	2022	Lee Young-ji	60
"Hug" (Prod. Slom) feat. Zion.T, Wonstein	2022	Lee Young-ji	136
"Original" (Prod. R. Tee) feat. Sion	2022	Don Malik	—
"Chosen 1"	2022	Blase	—
"See You!" (Prod. R. Tee) feat. Sole	2022	Huh	191
"Dejavu" (Prod. Slom) feat. Jay Park	2022	Lee Young-ji	93
"Bathtub" (욕조) (Prod. R. Tee) feat. Wheein, Justhis	2022	Don Malik	—
"Diamonds" feat. Lil Boi, Spray	2022	Blase	192
"Way Up" (Prod. R. Tee) feat. Camo, Justhis	2022	Huh	157
"Go" (Prod. Giriboy)	2022	Chillin Homie, Roh Yun-ha, Fleeky Bang, Khan	—

== Show Me the Money 12 ==
Title	Year	Contestant(s)	Peak chart positions
Title	Year	Contestant(s)	KOR
"No Manners" (Prod. Lil Moshpit) feat. Jay Park	2026	Dkay, Tray B, Zene the Zilla, Flowsik, Jeffrey White	100
"Money Checks" (Prod. Hukky Shibaseki)	2026	Nowimyoung, Fleeky Bang, Royal 44, Double Down, Young Shooter	30
"Ssak" (싹) (Prod. Gray) feat. Loco	2026	Oxynova, Mason Home, Foggyatthebottom, Milli, Osun	26
"Tick Tock" (Prod. Zico, Crush) feat. Zico	2026	Haon, Nosun, Raf Sandou, Marv, Jung Jun-hyuk	6
"MDLZ" (물들이자) with. Penomeco	2026	Marv	92
"Mr. Rocklee" (Prod. Lil Moshpit) feat. Justhis	2026	Zene the Zilla	126
"Mama" (Prod. Lil Moshpit) feat. Uneducated Kid	2026	Jeffrey White, Tray B	135
"Dirt!" (Prod. Zico) feat. Zico	2026	Raf Sandou, Jung Jun-hyuk	—
"Sky Pass" (Prod. Gray) feat. Bobby (IKon)	2026	Osun, Mason Home	40
"Kiss Kiss Kiss" (Prod. Hukky Shibaseki) feat. Sunwoo (The Boyz)	2026	Nowimyoung, Royal 44	11
"AEIOU" (아에이오우) (Prod. Gray) feat. Loco	2026	Milli	—
"Emergency" (비상사태) (Prod. Hukky Shibaseki) feat. J-Tong	2026	Fleeky Bang	128
"Bounce Back" (Prod. Lil Moshpit) feat. Jay Park	2026	Flowsik	—
"Soom" (숨) (Prod. Crush) feat. Crush	2026	Haon	152
"Robbing" (뺏어) (Prod. Matthew) feat. Roh Yun-ha, Coogie	2026	Mason Home	—
"Animal" (Prod. Hukky Shibaseki) feat. E Sens	2026	Nowimyoung	104
"2 Chainz & Rollies 2026" (Prod. Lil Moshpit) feat. The Quiett	2026	Zene the Zilla	190
"Never" (Prod. Gray) feat. Wonstein, Lil Boi	2026	Milli	—
"Koo Koo" (Prod. Zico, Crush) feat. Natty (Kiss of Life)	2026	Jung Jun-hyuk	—
"Baow" (Prod. Lil Moshpit) feat. Jay Park	2026	Tray B	—
"On to the Next" (Prod. Crush, Zico)	2026	Haon	94
"W.I.N" (Prod. Gray) feat. Bewhy	2026	Osun	131
"Pajama" (Prod. Zico, Crush) feat. Woodz	2026	Raf Sandou	76
"Oka" (Prod. Code Kunst) feat. Dimo Rex, Woo Won-jae	2026	Mason Home	—
"MSG" (Prod. Spatchies, Papzilla, Kirwav, Sawat) feat. Omega Sapien (Balming Tiger)	2026	Milli	—
"New New" (Prod. GroovyRoom) feat. Jay Park, Big Naughty, Lee Young-ji	2026	Tray B	195
"Now Im Young" (Prod. Hukky Shibaseki)	2026	Nowimyoung	186
"R.I.L + King's Gambit" (Prod. Zico, Crush) feat. Zico, Gaeko (Dynamic Duo), Sik-K, Vinxen	2026	Haon	126
"Gr8est" (Prod. Apro)	2026	Untell, Suen, YLN Foreign, Kambo, Luci Gang	—

== See also ==
- Unpretty Rapstar discography
