= Korean hip-hop =

Music genre

(South Korea) Korean hip-hop
- Stylistic origins: hip-hop
- Cultural origins: Late 1980s – early 1990s, South Korea

Other topics
- Breakdancing; Korean wave

Korean hip-hop, also known as K-hip-hop or K-rap, is a subgenre of the South Korean hip-hop scene.

It is widely considered to have originated in the late 1980s and early 1990s, and has since become increasingly popular, both in South Korea and abroad.

While South Korea's hip-hop culture includes various elements such as rap, graffiti, DJing, turntablism, and b-boying, rapping makes up a significant part of the culture. The term "hip-hop" is largely recognized and understood as "rap" in Korea.

== Characteristics ==
=== Linguistic hybridization ===
The interplay between the Korean language and English has been used as a technical and aesthetic device in Korean hip-hop. Many Korean hip-hop songs contain syllabic similarities that could be interpreted in either languages. The bilingual aspect of this music is one distinguishing factor between Korean hip-hop and American hip-hop.

As early-stage Korean hip-hop was heavily influenced by African-American hip-hop, Korean hip-hop artists began using AAVE in their lyrics. The dominance of Korean-Americans in the Korean hip-hop scene also contributed to the use of mixed languages in Korean hip-hop. English-speaking Korean diaspora artists such as Drunken Tiger, Epik High's Tablo, Swings, Jay Park, and San E have included English lyrics in their raps.

In the late 1990s and early 2000s, there were debates on the authenticity of lyrics written in English, and some artists deliberately refrained from using English in their lyrics. Garion was well known for using only the Korean language in their lyrics. The group's name, Garion, is a Korean word referring to a mythical white horse with a black mane, and it also reflects their heritage. Today, however, the movement has weakened as Korean rap is now believed to have become fully established in terms of its linguistic and rhythmic qualities.

=== Subject matter ===
Although Korean hip-hop adopted American hip-hop music, the difference in culture naturally led to the difference in lyrical content. For example, in the early stages of Korean hip-hop music, many Korean rappers referenced Confucian values and idioms. Bill Stax (formerly known as Vasco), a Korean rapper, explains, “While American hip-hop mainly dealt with themes of women, money, and drugs, there are no drugs in Korea. We need to tell stories that our friends can relate to and enjoy.” Themes that are most often dealt with in Korean hip-hop music are everyday life, personal stories and social issues specific to Korean culture in the case of underground hip-hop, and love in the case of mainstream hip-hop.

=== Musical elements ===
While differences in sound were deemed small in distinguishing Korean hip-hop music from American hip-hop music, there has been a consistent effort to incorporate Korean traditional sound into hip-hop music. Seo Taiji and Boys, the first Korean musician to adopt hip-hop elements in music, added a short solo playing of the traditional Korean conical oboe (taepyeongso) in their song "Hayeoga" (1993). MC Sniper, an underground rapper and the founder of the hip-hop crew Buddha Baby, is known for his early use of traditional musical and religious elements including the 12-stringed zither (gayageum) and the transverse bamboo flute (daegeum) and the Buddhist wooden percussion (moktak) in his productions. Ones, a first-generation Korean hip-hop musician, is known for his cross-over experiments between hip-hop and Korean traditional music. In April 2016, "Eung Freestyle" produced by DPR crew which mainly used the Korean instrument gayageum attracted global popularity after being released on YouTube.

Korean hiphop music also often shows musical influences from Korean ballads and trot, such as melodies based on Korean traditional pentatonic scales, so-called "gugak scales", and "bbongki" (뽕기), a bounciness closely associated with trot music.

There has been criticism for such a movement. Some musicians noted that Korean hip-hop should not have a unique sound, but follow or use a recognizable global hip-hop sound. For example, Code Kunst, a Korean hip-hop producer, noted that “I do not think Korea needs a unique sound of its own. People who are not Korean can sample ‘Korean’ sounds as well.”

=== Virtual and local scenes ===
Unlike American hip-hop, Korean hip-hop started in the rooms and personal computer spaces of hip-hop fans and then moved to the streets and performance spaces of Hongdae.

==== Web-based communities ====
Early stage Korean hip-hop was closely linked to the web-based communities created on web servers. Servers such as Chollian, HiTel, Daum, Nate, and Naver provided free web-based emails, messaging services, and forums. PC communities created in these servers such as BLEX, Dope Soundz, and Show N Prove (SNP) worked as a place to share Korean translations of English lyrics, swap imported cassette tapes and CDs, and discuss the meaning of hip-hop in their lives. First generation artists such as Verbal Jint, P-Type, Defconn (SNP), and Garion (BLEX) actively participated in these online communities. Web server-based communities diminished when people stopped using web servers in the early 2000s, and the communities moved onto webzines and online sites. These webzines not only published articles but also facilitated communications in the hip-hop scene. Some online sites such as Hiphopplaya (since 2000), Rhythmer (since 2001) HiphopLE (since 2010) are still actively used as an online community for hip-hop discussions as of 2019. Many of these online community users started holding a monthly offline meeting called jeongmo to discuss hip-hop music and perform their works, leading to the development of local scenes.

In early 2017, the very first Korean hip-hop Awards was presented by two of the largest Korean hip-hop webzines, HipHopLE and Hiphopplaya. Some of the awards included Rookie of the Year, Producer of the Year, hip-hop Track of the Year, hip-hop Album of the Year, and Artist of the Year. The winners being JUSTHIS, Groovy Room, BeWhy's “Forever”, Nucksal's The God of Small Things, and Jay Park respectively. In addition, the awards included a category showing which artists to look out for, such as Live and Mac Kidd.

==== Hongdae as a local scene ====
Since the mid-1990s, Hongdae became the physical center of the Korean hip-hop scene. Hongdae, a northwestern part of Seoul, is named after a nearby Hongik University in the area. Widely known for its prestigious art/music college and liberal atmosphere, Hongik University contributed to the emergence of youth culture including hip-hop music in the area. From the late 1990s, many clubs began to emerge in Hongdae where various types of music such as rock, techno, and hip-hop were played. Master Plan (MP), originally an indie rock club located in the greater Hongdae area, is often regarded as the birthplace of underground Korean hip-hop. MP worked as a site for consuming, performing, and sharing hip-hop music. Street hip-hop events such as Everyone's Mic hosted by Hiphopplaya also took place in Hongdae. Everyone's Mic is a weekly open rap competition for underground musicians where participants perform freestyle rap based on the beat played by the DJ. Hongdae not only functioned as a tangible place for production and consumption but also became a symbolic place for underground hip-hop music and imaginary gohyang (hometown) for musicians to build their identities.

=== Relations with the media ===
The media has played a huge role in forming the Korean hip-hop scene. The TV program Show Me the Money (SMTM) gained massive popularity and enabled hip-hop music to be mainstream music in Korea. However, criticism against the authenticity of the TV show resulted in the emergence of independent YouTube channels operated by hip-hop labels and musicians.

==== Hip-hop TV shows ====
Starting in 2012, hip-hop audition programs such as Show Me the Money, Unpretty Rapstar, and High School Rapper became widely popular in Korea. SMTM is an audition program for amateur and professional rappers in which the top 16 rappers divide into 4 teams and compete to be the final winner. Unpretty Rapstar is a female counterpart of SMTM and High School Rapper is a high school version of SMTM. As of November 2022, SMTM has had eleven seasons. Unpretty Rapstar has had 3 seasons since 2015 and High School Rapper has had 3 seasons since 2017. These reality competition shows are produced by Mnet, South Korea's largest cable music channel operated under CJ Entertainment & Media (CJ E&M), an entertainment and media conglomerate.

These TV shows changed the notion of underground and overground hip-hop music in South Korea. Before the show, musicians who signed with major labels and frequently appeared on TV were considered overground rappers while ones who performed on small stages and worked independently were recognized as underground rappers. However, as hip-hop TV shows made hip-hop music mainstream, even the underground rappers who were critical of overground rappers gained visibility through TV and started working with pop artists. Also, with the success of SMTM, underground rappers who negatively thought of signing with labels started considering the idea due to the promise of rising profits in the genre. For example, Deepflow of VMC who criticized overground rappers for commercializing the hip-hop scene, actively participated in several hip-hop TV shows as a producer from 2017. Nafla and Loopy of Mkit Rain who criticized overground rappers for joining SMTM eventually joined SMTM season 7 as participants as well. Rather than being a stage for only the overground rappers, media and TV shows are now viewed as an opportunity for all types of new rappers to gain visibility and rise to the stardom. This transition has eventually blurred the distinction between underground and overground musicians.

==== Social media and YouTube ====
Social media platforms such as YouTube and SoundCloud has been one of the main channels Korean hip-hop artists present their works and communicate with its fans. Mic Swagger, a YouTube-based freestyle rapping content that invites different hip-hop musicians as guests each episode, became a huge success throughout its four seasons since 2009 and contributed to the popularization of freestyle rap. Also, in response to the criticism against the mainstream hip-hop media like Mnet, hip-hop artists started creating independent channels to express their thoughts and present their music to the public. Label H1ghr Music partnered with Dingo, an online media content creator, to promote new songs independent from the mainstream media. In 2018, rapper Mommy Son released a song named “Mommy Jump” through his YouTube channel after being eliminated from SMTM season 7. The song, which directly condemned Mnet and SMTM, became a massive hit and was nominated the hip-hop song of the year with 38 million YouTube views (as of June 2019).

Rappers and idols also use social media apps as a way of connecting to their fans, creating a sense of friendship with their fans. The use of music streaming apps such as SoundCloud, YouTube, and Spotify can help in exposure for Korean artists, as many of these apps, especially SoundCloud, are used by young kids around the world to discover these artists. Much of the music on these apps provide a similar sound to American rap music, which is popular not only for American teenagers but teenagers abroad as well. There is also room for more experimentation on music platforms such as SoundCloud because artists can upload their work and express their creativity in a way they could not in the Korean idol system and form a deeper connection with their audiences with their work, as well as promote their solo work.

The emergence of bilingual Korean rappers also helps bridge the gap between Korean and American hip-hop music along with social media. They can communicate with American fans in a way most non-English-speaking Korean rappers cannot. DPR Live explained his newfound presence in the US with his first-ever concert, by saying “I always thought, you know, me being bilingual, just looking at the quality of both music, it's both up to par. But Korean music has just as nice flavor and amazing qualities. [It's] just the world doesn't know yet. And obviously, America is everywhere. Everyone knows. And I'm just excited to close the gap a little more.”

=== Overlap with the K-pop industry ===
In its early days, most Korean hip-hop fell into a category called "rap dance", where artists mixed rapping with pop music. Many K-pop artists incorporated rap into their music, from Seo Taiji and Jinusean in the 1990s to Big Bang and Block B in the 2010s. However, rap in K-pop music was not considered serious hip-hop music and some hip-hop musicians criticized K-pop music for commercializing hip-hop. For example, rapper Olltii criticized K-pop idol rappers in his Show Me the Money performance against Bobby for being unskilled and manufactured by large entertainment agencies.

As hip-hop music gained popularity and became part of Korean mainstream music, many idol rappers began to interact with the hip-hop scene. Jay Park, former leader of 2PM, went on to be the founder and CEO of two of the biggest Korean hip-hop labels, AOMG and H1GHR Music. Park has expressed that he doesn't consider himself a K-pop artist anymore as he feels distant from the K-pop industry nowadays. Zico, who was active as an underground rapper before officially debuting with Block B, gained the scene's respect for his rapping and producing skills and maintained a close relationship with the K-hip-hop scene throughout his career. However, there is discourse about whether idol rappers are real rappers. During BTS' rookie days, the group's rap line which consists of RM, Suga, and J-hope, received criticism from hip-hop artist B Free for "quitting" being rappers and continued saying idol rappers are not real rappers. iKon's Bobby won the third season of Show Me the Money. Song Mino of Winner was active as an underground rapper alongside Zico from Block B and was the runner-up of the fourth season of SMTM. Ravi of Vixx founded the hiphop label GROOVL1N, which is home to prominent rappers such as Nafla and JUSTHIS. BTS' RM collaborated and performed with rappers such as Zico and Changmo before joining the group, and has since then collaborated with several artists from the scene.

In addition, Korean hip-hop artists started collaborating with K-pop artists. Successful collaborations include "Some," a 2014 song by Soyou of girl group Sistar, R&B singer Junggigo, and rapper Lil Boi, that was Billboard's K-pop Hot 100's longest running #1 hit of 2014; "A Midsummer Night's Sweetness," a 2014 collaboration of After School's Raina and rapper San E, that topped ten Korean music charts shortly after its debut and went on to win several major year-end awards; and "I," a 2015 song by Girls' Generation's Taeyeon featuring rapper Verbal Jint, that topped eight Korean music charts after its release.

== History ==
=== Late 1980s–early 1990s: Origins of Korean hip-hop ===
Korean hip-hop first emerged in South Korea in the late 1980s and early 1990s. Hip-hop culture itself was introduced to South Korea through the influence of American soldiers stationed at the Yongsan Base during the war. The clubs in Itaewon initially served as a hub for American soldiers, but later, in the mid-1980s, they opened up to Korean citizens, who shared the dance floor to hip-hop beats. Following the end of authoritarian military rule in Korea, the loosening of state censorship of popular music in the late 1980s and the arrival of 1988 Seoul Olympics brought global musical styles like hip-hop, rap, and rhythm and blues through the Korean diaspora. Rock musician Hong Seo-beom's 1989 song about a 19th-century Korean poet, "Kim Sat-gat," is credited as being the first Korean pop song to contain rapping.

Hyun Jin-young, a rapper who debuted the following year with the album, New Dance, is considered to be the first Korean hip-hop artist.

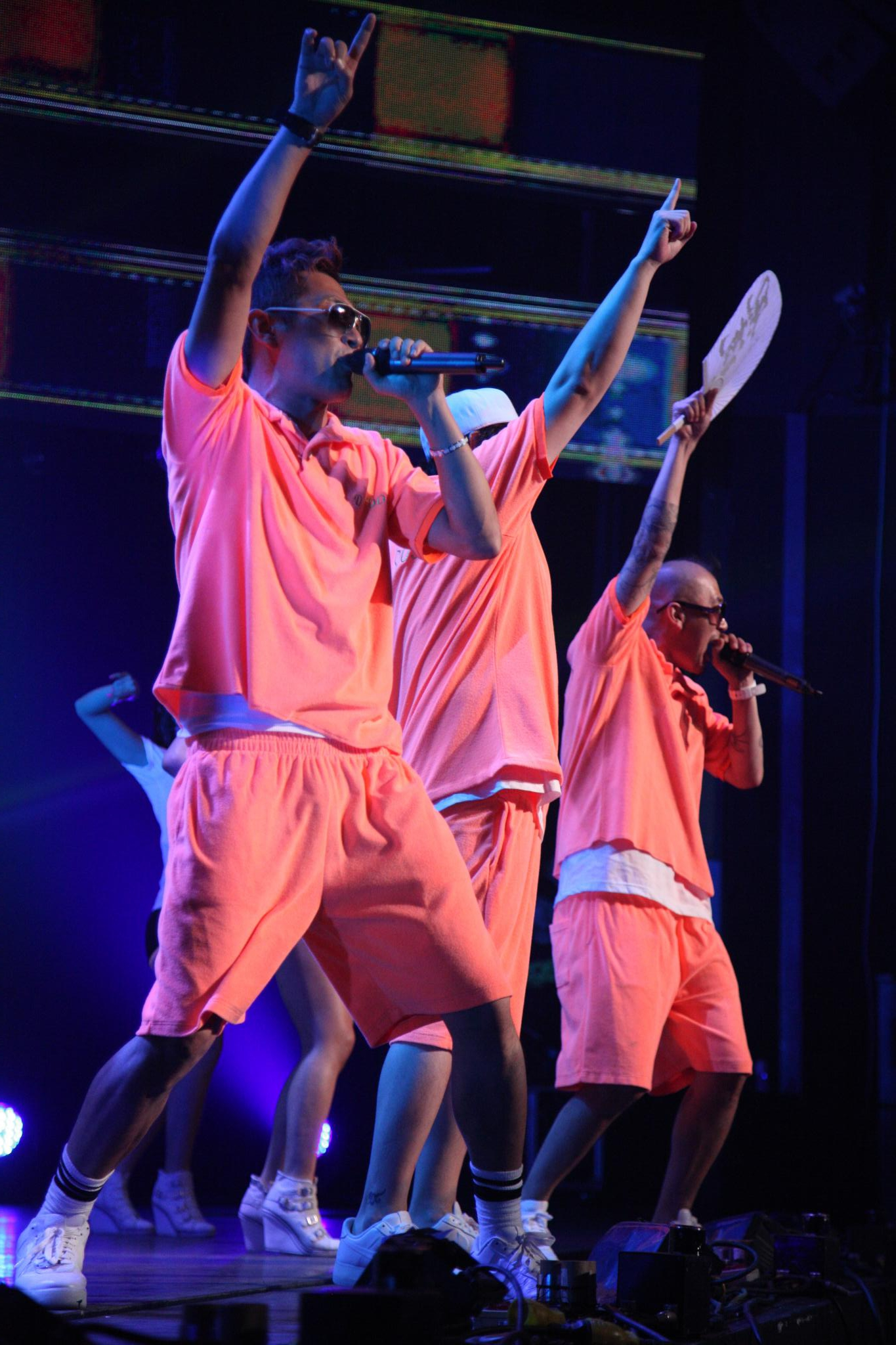
DJ DOC performing at Cyworld Dream Music Festival in 2011

The debut of Seo Taiji and Boys in 1992 with the song, "Nan Arayo" (난 알아요, "I Know") marked a revolution in Korean popular music. The group incorporated American-style hip-hop and R&B into their music, a move that was so influential that they are considered the originators of modern K-pop, and their explosive popularity paved the way for both pop and hip-hop artists in Korea.

Other popular groups who helped spread hip-hop into the Korean mainstream in the early 1990s include Deux and DJ DOC.

=== Late 1990s–2010s: Growing popularity and underground development ===
The Korean hip-hop scene grew considerably in the late 1990s and early 2000s due largely to a growing hip-hop club scene and the influence of the internet. While K-pop groups continued to incorporate rap into their songs, this period also saw the emergence of pure hip-hop groups, notably Drunken Tiger, "the first commercially successful true hip-hop group" in Korea. The group's single, "Good Life" topped Korean charts in 2001, although the group was considered controversial due to the explicit nature of their songs. hip-hop duo Jinusean, who were signed to former Seo Taiji and Boys member Yang Hyun-suk's new label YG Entertainment, also found mainstream success during this period with their songs "Tell Me" and "A-Yo," among others.

In 2001, then-underground rapper Verbal Jint released his first mini-album, Modern Rhymes, which introduced an innovation to Korean hip-hop: rhyming. Before this, Korean hip-hop lacked rhyming because it was seen as too difficult due to the grammatical structure of the Korean language. Verbal Jint's method for creating rhymes was widely adopted by other artists. Rap duo Garion also made an impact on the underground Korean hip-hop community with their 2004 self-titled debut album, notable for being entirely in Korean.

More Korean hip-hop artists experienced mainstream popularity and success in the 2000s and 2010s. Dynamic Duo's 2004 album, Taxi Driver, sold over half a million copies, making it the best-selling Korean hip-hop album ever at the time. Epik High topped music charts in both Korea and Japan in the mid-2000s and reached the #1 spot on the Billboard World Albums Chart with their 2014 album, Shoebox. Rap duo Leessang's album, Asura Balbalta, topped Korean charts just one hour after it was released in 2011, with every song from the album simultaneously charting in the top ten on several real-time music charts.

=== 2010s–present: Mainstream popularity with Show Me the Money and growth of independent labels ===
Korean hip-hop's profile was again heightened in 2012 with the debut of the TV reality series, Show Me the Money. The show, which features both underground and mainstream rappers, is credited with increasing the popularity of hip-hop in South Korea. Viewer ratings for SMTM seasons 4,5 and 6 continued to exceed 2%, which is exceptionally high for a cable TV channel program. During August 2015, July 2016, August 2017 and October 2018 when SMTM was aired, hip-hop was the most popular genre in Mnet Top 100 Korean music chart. SMTM worked as a publicity opportunity for previously unknown rappers such as C Jamm, Black Nut, Bewhy and Woo Won-jae. In SMTM 11, Rapper Lee Young-ji became the first female rapper to win the competition.

In August 2013, the Korean hip-hop scene became a ground for fierce diss battles. Influenced by Big Sean's hip-hop track “Control”, in which Kendrick Lamar's verse called out a handful of the new rappers in the U.S. music industry, Korean artists started sending disses in every direction with harsh lyrics. The “control diss war” began when Swings, the founder and member of Just Music, called out many other rappers by releasing his version of “Control” titled “King Swings” and “Hwang Jung-min (King Swings Part 2)". The flame flew in every direction and many rappers started dissing each other. One of the main events was when E-Sens, formerly of the hip-hop duo Supreme Team, released his single, “You Can't Control Me” to blatantly lash out at his former management company Amoeba Culture and former label mate Gaeko of Dynamic Duo. One day later, Gaeko responded to the rapper's challenge by releasing his track titled "I Can Control You". Eventually, more than 20 rappers including Simon Dominic, Ugly Duck, and Deep Flow participated in the “control diss war” before it ended within one week.

In 2015, Unpretty Rapstar aired as a spin-off of Show Me the Money. This music competition focused on female rappers including Season 1 runner-up Jessi, who the following year starred in KBS 2TV's Sister's Slam Dunk. It also featured Tymee who is known to be the fastest female rapper in Korea. In 2017, High School Rapper launched its first season and became a huge success, bringing many young amateur rappers to stardom. Many of the successful participants in High School Rapper signed with major hip-hop labels exemplified by Haon of h1gher Music, Ash Island of Ambition Musik and Young B of Indigo Music. Unpretty Rapstar and High School Rapper enabled hip-hop music to become one of the most popular music genres in Korea, especially among the younger generation.

In 2016, the Korea Foundation cited Korean hip-hop as a new trend in the Korean wave, the term commonly used to refer to the recent spread of Korean pop culture throughout the world.

Starting in 2016, major hip-hop labels in South Korea started creating their sub-labels, mostly to nurture young hip-hop musicians also referred to as the fourth generation rappers. Illionaire Records established Ambition Musik in 2016 by signing 3 artists who gained popularity through SMTM (Hash Swan, Keemhyoeun, ZENE THE ZILLA). Just Music followed up with its new label Indigo music, mostly bringing in teenage rappers who performed in High School Rapper season 1 including Osshun Gum, Young B, and Noel. Jay Park of AOMG founded H1GHR Music in joint with Seattle-based producer Cha Cha Malone and signed with young musicians such as Sik-K, Groovy Room and Haon. As these hip-hop labels and sub-labels were getting bigger, they were continuously making their voices louder against the large K-pop agencies that have been dominating the Korean music industry since the 2000s.

== Foreign relations ==
=== Localization ===
Korean hip-hop started from and was highly influenced by American hip-hop, yet evolved to have local characteristics as it adapted to the cultural context of Korean society. Since the 1990s, American hip-hop was brought into and spread through South Korea in several channels: tangible forms of music like cassette tapes and CDs from America to South Korea, individual bodies to/from America and within South Korea, and virtual communities of hip-hop listeners. Korean Americans especially played a significant role in localizing American hip-hop with their English-speaking ability and access to American culture. Tiger JK of Drunken Tiger and his wife Yoon Mi-rae, then a member of a Korean-American hip-hop/R&B group called Uptown, formed the Movement Crew, the influential hip-hop community that gave rise to groups like Dynamic Duo, Leessang, and Epik High, who collectively planted the localized hip-hop firmly in the mainstream pop music in South Korea. In Korea today, American hip-hop and Korean hip-hop exist as separate categories in almost every music chart and sales: oeguk hipap meaning foreign hip-hop and gungnae hipap meaning domestic hip-hop.

There are parallels between Korean and American hip-hop. Both genres follow many of the same trends, but Korean hip-hop adds its own elements, creating a sound based on widely popularised American music.

=== Globalization ===
Since 2010, Korean hip-hop music started to gain international popularity. Epik High is credited as the first Korean hip-hop musician to succeed in the international market. In 2014, with their album Shoebox, Epik High reached the #1 spot on the Billboard World Albums Chart. Epik High also held a North American tour and played in U.S. music and film festival SXSW in 2015 before becoming the first major Korean group to play at U.S. music festival Coachella in 2016. Epik High became one of the most talked about artists with #EpikHigh as one of the most used hashtags at the festival. Tablo in an interview with NBC News explains why hip-hop and rap are resonating with a lot of people nowadays stating, “…rap is an art form that is very welcoming of youth culture and youth idea.” After finishing their contract with YG Entertainment in 2018, Epik High started another North American tour in 2019.

The interest in SMTM has also spread abroad, with rappers who participated in the show's fourth season performing in the United States in 2015. The show also held auditions for its fifth season in Los Angeles in 2016. Although critical questions were posed, SMTM started self-positioning itself as a “global hip-hop battle” since season 5. The popularity of SMTM led to other Korean hip-hop artists, including the rosters of popular record labels Illionaire Records, AOMG, and Amoeba Culture, to tour around the world. AOMG toured China and the United States in 2016, South East Asia in 2017, and North America and Europe in 2019. Amoeba Culture and Illionaire Records also toured the United States in 2015, 2016 and 2017.

The incorporation of trap music in Korean hip-hop has become a major factor to its growing success overseas. Though less popular in his native South Korea, rapper Keith Ape became a viral sensation in 2015 with his song, "It G Ma." The song is credited with helping expand Korean hip-hop's audience abroad. He has stated in a Complex interview, “It's important to me to be acknowledged by the birthplace of hip-hop culture and I'm thankful for everything that's happened. Many Western people who don't speak Korean now know the phrase ‘It G Ma’.” The following year, Eung Freestyle (응프리스타일) performed by DPR Live, Sik-K, Punchnello, Owen Ovadoz, and Flowsik gained attention with the help of Youtube's Music's Ad Campaign.

Korean hip-hop artists are continuously making a deliberate effort to expand their presence in the global market, especially in the North American Market. On July 20, 2017, Jay Park officially became part of Jay-Z's record label Roc Nation. He posted on his Instagram account stating, “This is a win for the Town, this is a win for Korea, this is a win for Asian Americans…” In 2019, MBC launched a new program titled Target: Billboard – Kill Bill. The show enlisted renowned hip-hop artists to compete for a chance to collaborate with DJ Khaled. In doing so, the program's ultimate goal is for Korean hip-hop artists to "kill the Billboard" charts.

== Criticism ==
While most artists label their music as “Korean hip-hop” in their lyrics or interviews; some musicians consciously move away from it by calling their music just “hip-hop.” Some artists confessed their discomfort in labeling their music as “Korean” hip-hop claiming that they would rather have their music be heard as hip-hop. These artists wanted their music to be placed within global hip-hop and alongside what is currently being produced in America. Dok2, one of the most recognized figures in the Korean hip-hop scene, once mentioned, "We are sharing a global trend. It is not a Korean musician copying an American song, but rather sharing a musical trend as one of the many hip-hop musicians in the world. I simply think of my music like this: Can I imagine this song being released in America and not just in Korea? Will people like it? Does it not drift away from the bigger picture? If we listen to it alongside what is topping the iTunes hip-hop chart, does it fit there? If I look at other Korean rappers’ music, it does not fit at all. Of course, there is a trend that is uniquely Korean, but that is gayo. That is K-pop and not hip-hop."

== Non-musical aspects ==
=== B-boying scene ===
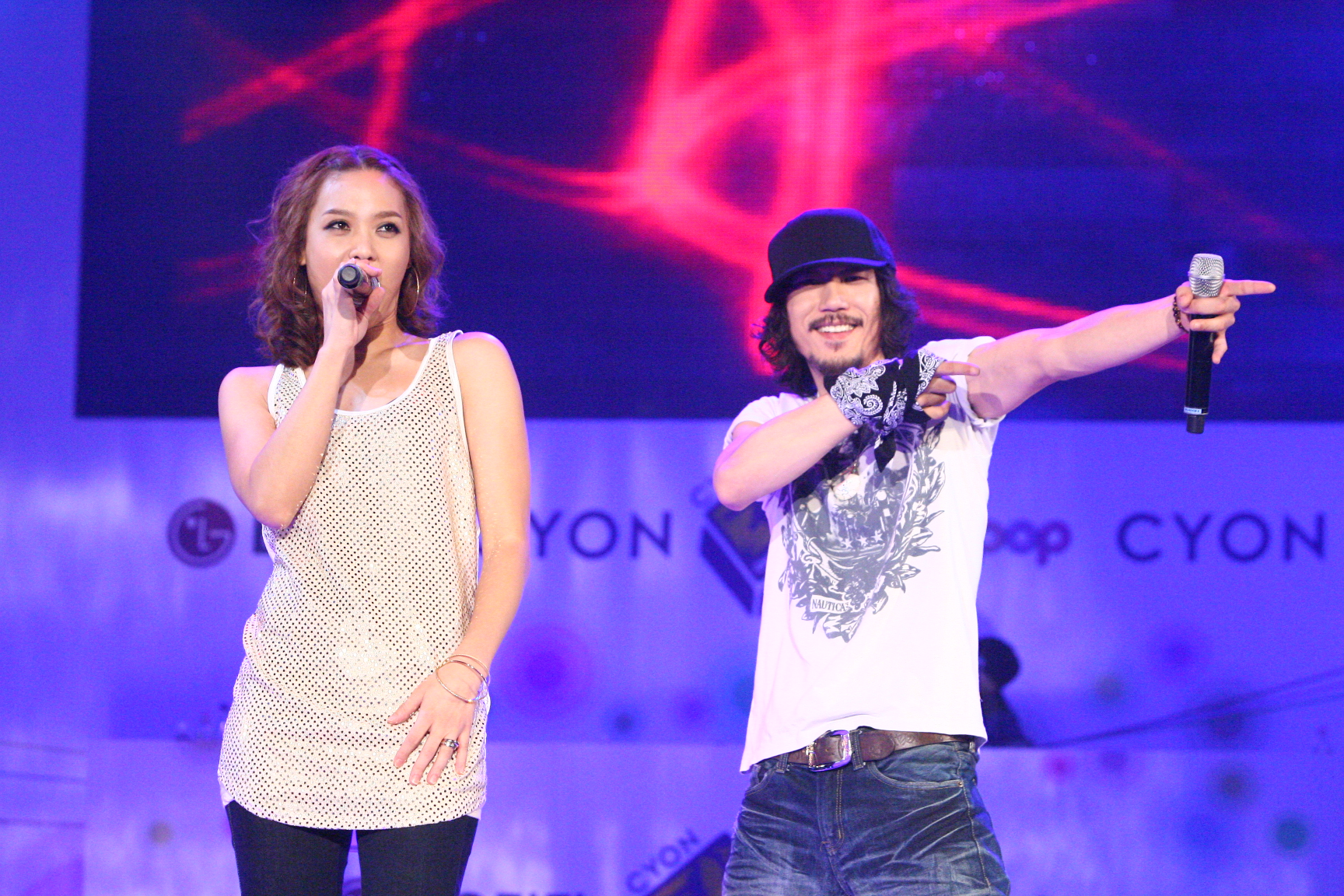
Yoon Mi-rae and Tiger JK performing at LG Electronics' CYON B-Boy Championship 2010 finals

B-boying, also known as break dancing, was introduced to South Korea in the 1980s by dance clubs in the Itaewon neighborhood of Seoul, which was frequented by U.S. military personnel and other foreigners. There are different opinions on what truly counts as the first group that started the trend of incorporating elements of break dance into korean music, but the earliest example is the group UCDC (United College Dance Club) formed by Lee Sung Moon. Dance crew called "Rhythm touch" was initially influential, as they were back dancers for singers Insooni and Kim Wan-sun. In 1983, Lee also founded the breaking dance group "Spark", which is also cited as the first Korean breaking dance group. One of the most famous venues these early dance groups learned thesr skills from was a club called Moonnight in Itaewon, which was originally a foreigners only club. However, it wasn't until 2001 that Korean b-boys received international recognition when the dance crew Visual Shock won "best show" and fourth place at Battle of the Year, the biggest b-boy competition in the world. Korean crews went on to win either first or second place at the competition for the next several years.

In 2007, the Korean Tourism Organization founded an international b-boying competition called R-16 Korea. The event, which draws tens of thousands of spectators to Seoul each year, is also highly profitable for the South Korean government. South Korean hip-hop artists, including Jay Park, Yoon Mi-rae, and Drunken Tiger's Tiger JK, have performed at R-16.

B-boying has also experienced popularity in South Korean theater, including, notably, the musical, Ballerina Who Loved a B-Boy, which premiered in South Korea in 2005 with performances in other countries, including Singapore, Japan, China, Guam, Colombia, the United Kingdom, and the United States. The show was still staged daily in South Korea as of 2013.

=== Fashion ===
In terms of fashion, many young South Koreans prefer a hip-hop style. Hip-hop urban wear and streetwear are usually associated with the K-hip-hop scene, which is now becoming mainstream, YG Entertainment, one of the biggest hip-hop promoters in South Korea, does a few sponsorship deals in clothing, YG artist, Jinusean's Sean started his own clothing company called MF (Majah Flavah). On 28 June 2012, YG and Cheil Industries agreed to launch a fashion brand that would cater not only to Korean teenagers, but also to the global fashion market. The first NONAGON store opened in September and sold out within three days. YG artists Bobby and B.I. promoted the brand by wearing its clothing on SMTM3.

== See also ==
- Korean wave
- K-pop
- Breakdancing
- Show Me the Money
- Unpretty Rapstar
- High School Rapper
