= Giriboy =

South Korean rapper (born 1991)

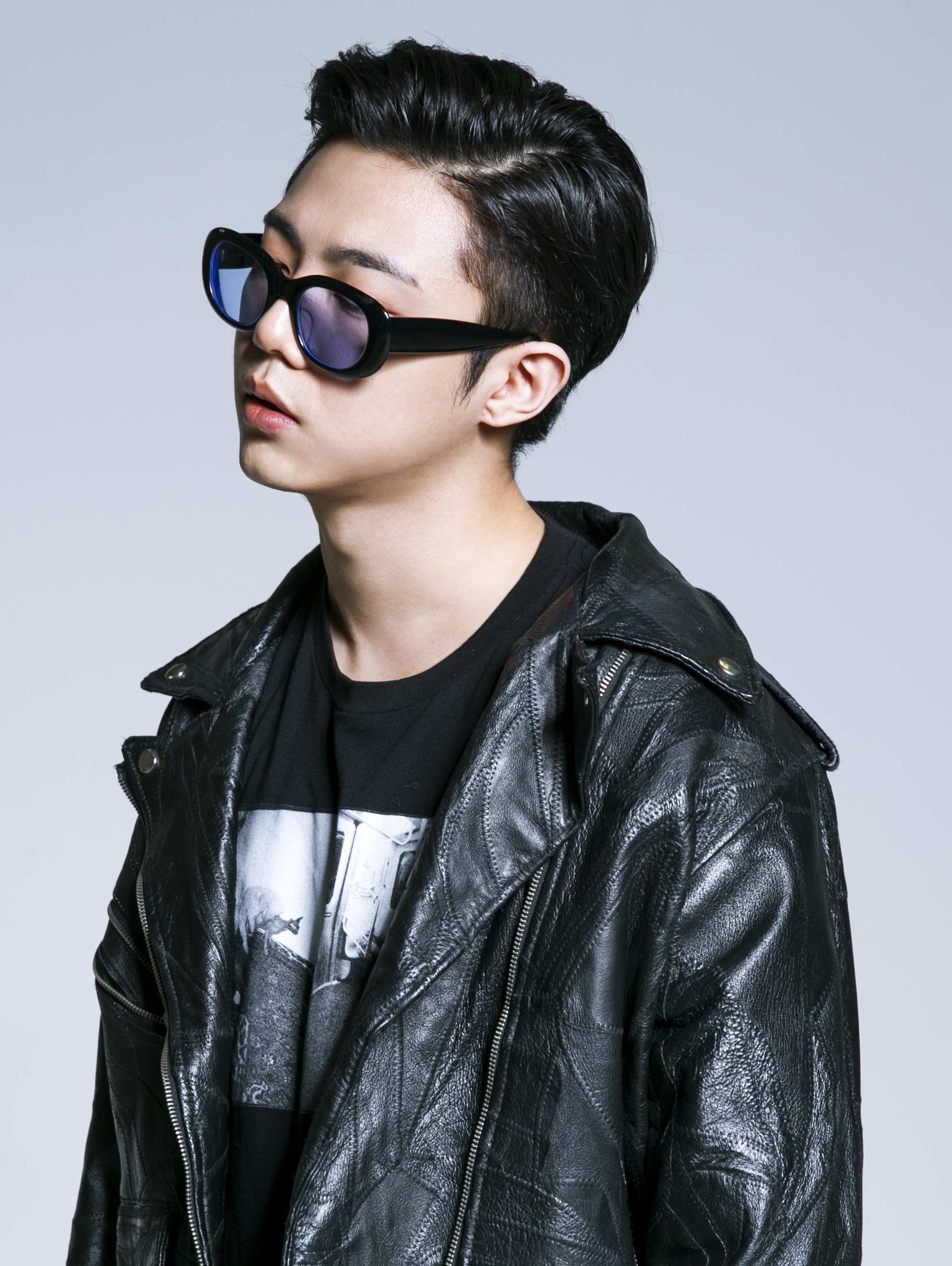

Background information
- Born: Hong Si-young; January 24, 1991 (age 35); Seoul, South Korea
- Genre: Korean hip hop
- Occupations: Rapper; singer; songwriter; record producer; actor
- Years active: 2011–present
- Label: Standard Friends

Korean name
- Hangul: 홍시영
- RR: Hong Siyeong
- MR: Hong Siyŏng

Hong Si-young (Korean: 홍시영; born January 24, 1991), better known by his stage name Giriboy (Korean: 기리보이), is a South Korean rapper and singer signed to the Standard Friends label.

== Career ==
Giriboy began his musical career in 2011 with the single "You Look So Good to Me", released under Just Music, a label that had been recently founded by rapper Swings. The following year, he released the EP Fatal Album, much of which he had written years earlier as a high school student. He released a second EP titled Fatal Album II later that year.

Giriboy competed on season three of the TV show Show Me the Money in 2014. That year, he also entered the top 100 of the Gaon Digital Chart for the first time with the single "Fluttering Feelings", a collaboration with singer NS Yoon-G. The song ultimately peaked at No. 6 on the chart.

In 2015, he appeared on the reality show No Mercy, in which he collaborated on songs with the contestants (who would go on to form the boy group Monsta X) and with established artists Soyou and Mad Clown. He also released the album Sexual Perceptions, which reached No. 10 on the Gaon Album Chart in March.

In 2016, he released his fourth album, Mechanical Album. In 2017, he released his fifth EP, called 5 Songs For Initiation. In December of the same year, he released his fifth album, Graduation.

In 2024, Giriboy signed to South Korean label Standard Friends founded by artist Zion.T

== Discography ==
=== Studio albums ===
Title	Album details	Peak chart positions	Sales
Title	Album details	KOR	Sales
Sensual Album (육감적인 앨범)	Released: January 20, 2014; Label: Just Music, Linchpin Music Corp.; Formats: CD, digital download	—	—N/a
Sexual Perceptions (성인식)	Released: March 17, 2015; Label: Just Music, Linchpin Music Corp.; Formats: CD, digital download	10	KOR: 1,886
Mechanical Album (기계적인 앨범)	Released: May 31, 2016; Label: Just Music, Linchpin Music Corp.; Formats: CD, digital download	13	KOR: 1,558
Graduation (졸업식)	Released: December 20, 2017; Label: Just Music, Linchpin Music Corp.; Formats: CD, digital download	32	KOR: 1,559
Science Fiction Music (공상과학음악)	Released: September 22, 2018; Label: Just Music, Linchpin Music Corp.; Formats: CD, digital download	8	KOR: 1,829
100 Years College Course (100년제전문대학)	Released: June 10, 2019; Label: Just Music, Linchpin Music Corp.; Formats: CD, digital download	15	KOR: 4,198
Fatal Album III (치명적인 앨범 III)	Released: December 2, 2019; Label: Just Music, Linchpin Music Corp.; Formats: CD, digital download	16	KOR: 3,974
9Cut (9컷)	Released: December 23, 2020; Label: Just Music, Linchpin Music Corp.; Formats: LP, CD, digital download	21	—N/a
Avante	Released: October 14, 2021; Label: Just Music, Linchpin Music Corp.; Formats: LP, CD, digital download	18	KOR: 5,000
Novel (소설 쓰고 자빠졌네)	Released: October 26, 2023; Label: Just Music, Linchpin Music Corp.; Formats: CD, digital download	30	KOR: 3,691
GRB01 + GRB02	Released: October 15, 2024; Label: Standard Friends; Formats: CD, digital download	48	KOR: 1,150
I Tend to Get Tongue-Tied (제가 말주변이 없어서)	Released: April 10, 2025; Label: Standard Friends; Formats: CD, digital download	92	KOR: 988
"—" denotes releases that did not chart.

=== Extended plays ===
Title	Album details	Peak chart positions	Sales
Title	Album details	KOR	Sales
Fatal Album (치명적인 앨범)	Released: June 19, 2012; Label: Just Music; Formats: CD, digital download	—	—N/a
Fatal Album II (치명적인 앨범 II)	Released: December 4, 2012; Label: Just Music; Formats: CD, digital download	—	—N/a
4 Lonely Songs (외롬적인 4곡)	Released: September 1, 2015; Label: Just Music, Linchpin Music Corp.; Formats: CD, digital download	—	—N/a
5 Songs for Initiation (신고식 5곡)	Released: April 4, 2017; Label: Just Music, Linchpin Music Corp.; Formats: Digital download	—	—N/a
Hightechnology	Released: July 22, 2018; Label: Just Music, Linchpin Music Corp.; Formats: Digital download	—	—N/a
Hightechnology: 3 Songs & Instrumentals	Released: August 30, 2018; Label: Just Music, Linchpin Music Corp.; Formats: CD, digital download	27	KOR: 1,000
Science Fiction Music: End (공상과학음악 : 결말)	Released: November 24, 2018; Label: Just Music, Linchpin Music Corp.; Formats: Digital download	—	—N/a
Thank You (땡큐)	Released: December 28, 2018; Label: Just Music, Linchpin Music Corp.; Formats: Digital download	—	—N/a
KGVOVC From WYBH Vol.1	Released: January 24, 2019; Label: Just Music, Linchpin Music Corp.; Formats: Digital download	—	—N/a
Gab Boon Gi (갑분기)	Released: August 2, 2019; Label: Just Music, Linchpin Music Corp.; Formats: Digital download	—	—N/a
Like a Film (영화같게)	Released: October 4, 2020; Label: Just Music, Linchpin Music Corp.; Formats: Cassette, digital download	80	—N/a
Appendix (별책)	Released: December 15, 2023; Label: Just Music, Linchpin Music Corp.; Formats: CD, digital download	98	KOR: 840
Why Are You Always Like This? (넌 왜 항상 이런 식이야)	Released: January 16, 2025; Label: Standard Friends; Formats: Digital download	—	—N/a
"—" denotes releases that did not chart.

=== Singles ===
==== As lead artist ====
Title	Year	Peak chart positions	Album
Title	Year	KOR	Album
"You Look So Good to Me" (feat. Swings)	2011	—	Non-album single
"Planned Girl" (계획적인 여자) (feat. Ggamo and Zico)	2012	—	Fatal Album
"It Shows On Your Face" (얼굴에 다 써 있네요) (feat. Ugly Duck)	2012	—	Fatal Album
"My Body Is Burning" (내 몸이 불타오르고 있어) (feat. Swings)	2012	—	Non-album single
"Different Look" (다른꼴) (feat. Crucial Star)	2012	—	Fatal Album II
"Skit" (feat. Swings)	2013	112	Sensual Album
"Wake Up" (feat. Swings)	2013	—	Sensual Album
"Camp" (feat. Swings)	2014	118	Sensual Album
"Why Do You Live Like This?" (왜 그렇게 사니)	2014	129	Non-album singles
"Edited By Devil" (악마의 편집)	2014	—	Non-album singles
"Back and Forth 30 Min" (왕복 30분) (feat. Shin Ji-soo)	2015	28	Sexual Perceptions
"Wu Gyeol" (우결) (feat. Fromm)	2015	55	4 Lonely Songs
"Hogu" (호구) (feat. Brother Su)	2015	29	Non-album single
"Because You're Pretty" (예쁘잖아)		33	Mechanical Album
"All Day" (하루종일) (feat. DJ SQ and Han Yo-han)	2016	71	Mechanical Album
"I'm in Trouble" (feat. Loco)	2016	62	Mechanical Album
"Let's Drink" (술자리)	2016	46	Non-album single
"High Speed" (고속)	2017	42	5 Songs for Initiation / Graduation
"The Graduate" (졸업)	2017	—	Graduation
"TV Star" (바보상자스타) (feat. Kim Seung-min)	2017	—	Graduation
"northbutsouth" (feat. Kid Milli)	2018	—	Non-album singles
"Empty House" (빈집) (feat. Thama)	2018	—	Non-album singles
"Peace" (평화) (feat. Crush and Choi LB)	2018	—	Hightechnology
"Used" (옛날거)	2018	—	Hightechnology: 3 Songs & Instrumentals
"Keyboard" (키보드)	2018	97	Science Fiction Music
"Attention Whore" (관종) (feat. Thama)	2018	—	Science Fiction Music: End
"Sorry" (미안) (feat. OLNL)	2018	—	Thank You
"Traffic Control" (교통정리) (feat. Heize)	2019	18	100 Years College Course
"Tokyo" (도쿄) (feat. Youra)	2019	78	100 Years College Course
"Hurts" (아퍼) (feat. Kid Milli, Lil Tachi, Kim Seung-min, NO:EL and C Jamm)	2019	32	100 Years College Course
"Party People" (파티피플) (feat. Yumdda and Uneducated Kid)	2019	89	Gab Boon Gi
"Tiger Den" (호랑이소굴) (feat. Jvcki Wai)	2019	45	Fatal Album III
"Divorce Papers" (이혼서류)	2019	79	Fatal Album III
"Eul" (을) (feat. Big Naughty)	2019	58	Fatal Album III
"Snow Sweeping" (제설)	2019	76	Fatal Album III
"What's Wrong" (와츠롱) (feat. Yunhway)	2019	88	Fatal Album III
"Hurts" (아퍼) (Band version) (feat. Young B, Yunhway, Lil Tachi, Han Yo-han, Justhis and Swings)	2019	193	Non-album singles
"Baby" (애기)	2020	185	Non-album singles
"Just Kidding" (농담처럼)	2020	147	Non-album singles
"Lasik" (라식)	2020	139	Like a Film / 9Cut
"Reverse" (리버스) (feat. Ahn Byeong-woong, Khakii and Kim Mono)	2020	—	Non-album single
"It Was Love" (사랑이었나봐)	2020	102	9Cut
"Spacetime" (시공간)	2021	106	Avante
"Die Die" (feat. Choi LB)	2021	187	Non-album single
"Because I Was Young" (그땐 어렸으니까)	2021	180	Avante
"You Turned Around" (그리고 돌아섰다)	2021	186	Avante
"What a Mess" (엉망진창)	2021	—	Avante
"One Snowy Day" (눈이 오던 날) (feat. Sole)	2022	66	Non-album single
"Issu du Feu" (불로부터)	2022	—	Novel
"That's Why I Can't Talk About Love" (feat. Woo Won-jae)	2022	—	Non-album single
"What Should I Do?" (뭐 어떡할까)	2023	138	Novel
"Tik Tok" (시간이날기다려) (Band version) (feat. Choi LB and Big Naughty)	2023	—	Archive
"Drive Me Crazy" (미춰버리겠어)	2024	—	I Tend to Get Tongue-Tied
"Hur" (feat. C Jamm)	2024	—	GRB01
"Peak" (feat. Camo)	2024	—	GRB02
"I Think It's Love" (사랑인 것 같은데)	2025	—	Why Are You Always Like This? / I Tend to Get Tongue-Tied
"My Job Is Cool" (feat. J-Tong and Zico)	2025	—	I Tend to Get Tongue-Tied
"—" denotes releases that did not chart.

==== Collaborations ====
Title	Year	Peak chart positions	Album
Title	Year	KOR	Album
"Let's Have a Drink" (한잔해요) (with Lil Boi)	2012	—	Non-album singles
"Rain Showers" (with Swings and C Jamm)	2014	—	Non-album singles
"Hongkiyoung #2" (with Swings and Genius Nochang)	2014	—	Ripple Effect
"I'm Going" (난 앞으로만) (with Swings, C Jamm, and Vasco)	2014	—	Ripple Effect
"Just" (with Swings, Vasco, and Genius Nochang)	2014	—	Ripple Effect
"Fluttering Feelings" (설렘주의) (with NS Yoon-G)	2014	6	Non-album single
"Breath" (숨) (with Shannon and Vasco)		64	Eighteen
"Pillow" (팔베개) (with Soyou, feat. Kihyun)	2015	5	No.Mercy Part 2
"0 (Young)" (with Mad Clown and Jooyoung, feat. No Mercy)	2015	71	No.Mercy Part 3
"Cliché" (글쎄...) (with Moonshine)	2015	—	Non-album singles
"Days of Disturbance" (소란했던 시절에) (with Junggigo)	2016	—	Vintage Box
"Eum Eum" (음음) (with Goretexx, Black Nut, Bill Stax, Genius Nochang, and Swings)	2017	—	We Effect
"Bunzi" (번지) (with Xitsuh and Young B)	2017	28	High School Rapper Part 2
"Flex" (with Kid Milli, NO:EL, and Swings)	2018	11	Non-album singles
"IndiGO Remix" (with The Quiett, Mommy Son, and Swings)	2018	—	Non-album singles
"Supernatural Power" (초능력) (with Choi LB, Kim Seung-min and OLNL)	2019	—	KGVOVC From WYBH Vol.1
"IMJMWDP" (with NO:EL, Black Nut, Yang Hong-won, Osshun Gum, Yunhway, Justhis, Jvcki Wai, Kid Milli, Han Yo-han, and Swings)	2019	152	Non-album singles
"Super Birthday" (슈퍼버스데이) (with Superbee)	2019	—	Non-album singles
"Call Me Before You Sleep" (잠들기 전 전화해) (with Jessica Jung)	2019	—	Non-album singles
"Acting" (연기) (with Heize)	2020	98	Like a Film / 9Cut
"No Ex" (with Paloalto)	2021	—	Non-album singles
"Your Night, Your Star, Your Moon" (너의 밤, 너의 별, 너의 달) (with Kim Yoo-jung)	2021	55	Non-album singles
"Never Meant to Be" (안 될 사람) (with Heize)	2026	140	Non-album singles
"—" denotes releases that did not chart.

=== Soundtrack appearances ===
Title	Year	Peak chart positions	Album
Title	Year	KOR	Album
"Hyena" (하이에나)	2020	—	Hyena OST Part 4
"A Rat in the Trap" (독 안에 든 쥐)	2021	—	Mouse OST Part 3
"Abnormal Climate" (이상기후)	2022	—	Forecasting Love and Weather OST Part 8
"100 °C" (feat. Yunhway)	2022	112	Street Man Fighter OST Part 3
"At Night" (간밤에)	2023	—	Crash Course in Romance OST Part 4

=== Other charted songs ===
Title	Year	Peak chart positions	Album
Title	Year	KOR	Album
As lead artist
"Adult" (성인)	2015	72	Sexual Perceptions
"Beggar" (거지) (feat. Yunhway, Jhnovr, and Justhis)	2019	147	Deadly Album III
"A Star Is Falling" (별이지고있다)	2019	162	Deadly Album III
"The Time Is Now" (이때다)	2019	175	Deadly Album III
"Let's Not Love Each Other" (우리서로사랑하지는말자)	2020	110	Like a Film / 9Cut
"Smile, Wait for the Flash" (찰칵)	2020	193	Like a Film / 9Cut
As featured artist
"Gravity" (Swings feat. Giriboy and Mad Clown)	2014	34	Obsessive Compulsive Disorder
"The End" (끝) (2LSON feat. Giriboy and Jo Hyun-ah)	2014	47	Non-album single
"Ma First" (Jang Hyun-seung feat. Giriboy)	2015	19	MY
"Don't Be Such a Baby" (애처럼 굴지마) (Sistar feat. Giriboy)	2015	10	Shake It
"Chocolate Chip Cookies" (초코칩쿠키) (Goo Hara feat. Giriboy)	2015	85	Alohara (Can You Feel It?)
"OeO" (Xia feat Giriboy)	2015	46	Yesterday
"Sometimes" (가끔) (Geeks feat. Giriboy and Crush)	2016	2	Fireworks
"SF Skills" (공상과학기술) (Nafla, OLNL, and Odee feat. Giriboy and Swings)	2018	28	Show Me the Money 777
"Breaking Bad" (브레이킹배드) (OLNL feat. Giriboy)	2018	59	Show Me the Money 777
"Sunbbang" (Nafla feat. Giriboy and Gaeko)	2018	89	Show Me the Money 777
"Taste" (호불호) (Woo Won-jae feat. Giriboy)	2019	21	Non-album singles
"We Don't Talk Together" (Heize feat. Giriboy)	2019	2	Non-album singles
"Bada" (바다) (Woodie Gochild, Choi LB, Big Naughty, Young B, and Chillin Homie, feat. Giriboy)	2019	48	Show Me the Money 8
"Flower" (꽃) (Code Kunst feat. Giriboy, Jay Park, and Woo Won-jae)	2020	140	People
"Tomorrow" (내일이 오면) (Lil Boi feat. Giriboy and Big Naughty)	2020	2	Show Me the Money 9
"Credit" (Lil Boi feat. Giriboy, Yumdda, and Zion.T)	2020	8	Show Me the Money 9
"Face Time" (Since feat. Giriboy, pH-1, and Gaeko)	2021	47	Show Me the Money 10
"Holiday" (Blase feat. Giriboy and Lil Boi)	2022	94	Show Me the Money 11

== Filmography ==
=== Film ===
Year	Title	Role	Notes	Ref.
2022	A Glimpse at Lee Hyo-ri	The second elder	TVING Short Film	
2026	It's Okay to Breathe Next to You	Kyung-tae		

=== Television series ===
Year	Title	Role	Notes	Ref.
2022–2023	The Forbidden Marriage	Jeong Do-seok	Debut as an actor	

=== Television shows ===
Year	Title	Role	Notes	Ref.
2014	Show Me The Money 3	Contestant		
2017	High School Rapper	Judge	with Seo ChulGu	
2018	Show Me the Money 777	Judge	with Swings	
2019	High School Rapper 3	Judge	with Kid Milli	
2019	Show Me the Money 8	Judge	with BGM-v crew	
2020	Show Me The Money 9	Judge	with Zion.T	
2022	Baby Singer	Teacher		
2023	Super Karaoke Survival: VS	Producer	with Car the Garden	

== Awards and nominations ==
Year presented, name of the award ceremony, award category, nominated work and the result of the nomination
Year	Award	Category	Nominated work	Result	Ref
2019	Korean Hip-hop Awards	Producer of the Year	Giriboy	Won	
2019	Korean Hip-hop Awards	Artist of the Year	Giriboy	Nominated	
2019	Korean Hip-hop Awards	Hip Hop Track of the Year	"Flex" with Swings, Kid Milli, NO:EL	Nominated	
2019	Korean Hip-hop Awards	Music Video of the Year	"Flex" with Swings, Kid Milli, NO:EL	Nominated	
2019	Korean Hip-hop Awards	Collaboration of the Year	"Flex" with Swings, Kid Milli, NO:EL	Nominated	
2020	Korean Hip-hop Awards	Producer of the Year	Giriboy	Won	
2020	Korean Hip-hop Awards	Artist of the Year	Giriboy	Nominated	
2020	Mnet Asian Music Awards	Best Hip Hop & Urban Music	"Eul" feat. Big Naughty	Nominated	
