= Swings (rapper) =

South Korean rapper (born 1986)

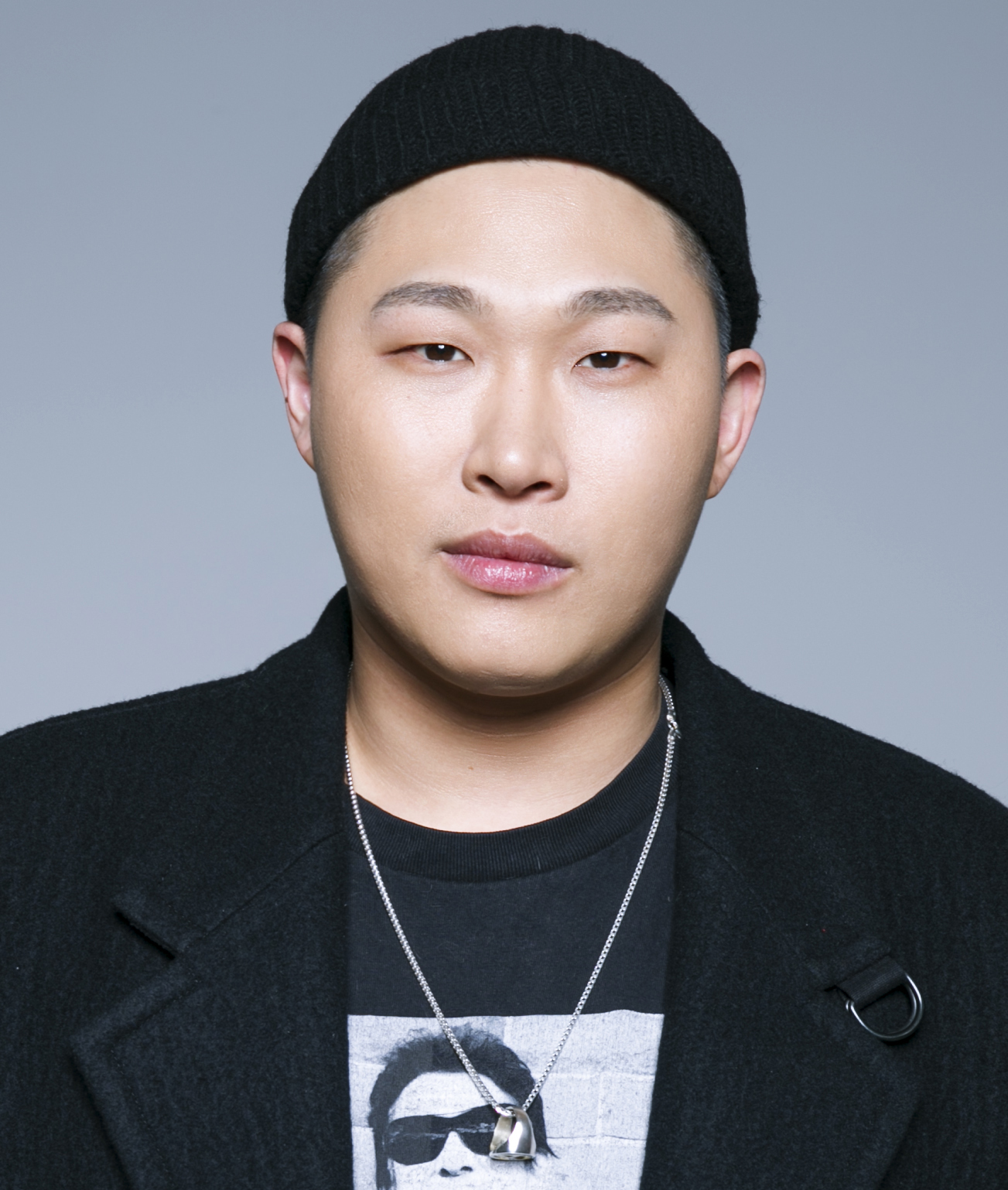
- Swings in 2016

Background information
- Also known as: Moon Swings, Jonathan Moon
- Born: Moon Ji-hoon; October 14, 1986 (age 40)
- Origin: Sungkyunkwan University
- Genre: Hip hop
- Occupations: Rapper
- Years active: 2008–present
- Labels: Just Music; Indigo Music; P Nation
- Website: wejustmusic.com

Korean name
- Hangul: 문지훈
- RR: Mun Jihun
- MR: Mun Chihun

Moon Ji-hoon (Korean: 문지훈, born October 14, 1986), better known by the stage name Swings (스윙스), is a South Korean rapper. Formerly under the label Brand New Music, he is currently signed to P Nation.

== Career ==
Swings debuted in 2008 with the extended play Upgrade. He joined the hip hop group Uptown in 2009 but left by the end of the year. He released his first full-length album, Growing Pains, in 2010.

He gained popularity after competing on the second season of the TV rap competition Show Me the Money in 2013. That summer, Swings triggered a "Control Diss Phenomenon" within the Korean hip hop scene with the release of his diss track "King Swings Part 2", over the instrumental of Big Sean's "Control", in which he accused rapper Simon Dominic of not protecting his Supreme Team member E-Sens from an alleged slave contract offered by label Amoeba Culture. Swings was named Artist of the Year for 2013 by Korean hip hop magazine HIPHOPPLAYA.

The "Control Diss Phenomenon" marked a significant point in Swings' career. At the time, diss battles were relatively uncommon in South Korean hip hop, which had adopted the genre's culture later than other markets. The event encouraged other rappers to engage in competitive battles, helping to establish diss culture as a more prominent part of the South Korean hip hop scene.

In 2014, he returned to Show Me the Money as a producer for its third season, alongside established rappers including San E and Tablo.

Swings left the label Brand New Music in August 2014 to focus his own record label, Just Music. The label currently represents the rappers Black Nut, Giriboy, Genius Nochang, C Jamm, and Vasco.

In April 2017, it established its second label, Indigo Music. It has become one of the most notable hip-hop labels, recruiting Yang Hongwon (previously known as Young B), Kid Milli, Justhis, Jvcki Wai, and Noel as its artists.

Psy announced on Instagram on April 29, 2021, that Swings had signed a contract with P Nation. Three years following his signing, he announced his eighth studio album Upgrade V as his first release under the company, to be released on March 8, 2024.

== Personal life ==
Swings is a fluent English speaker, having lived in Atlanta, Georgia, and studied English at Sungkyunkwan University.

He enlisted in the South Korean military in November 2014, despite being exempt from mandatory military service due to psychological disorders. He was discharged from the military in September 2015 due to his mental health. Swings said that he has been receiving treatment since he was young for illnesses including obsessive–compulsive disorder, post-traumatic stress disorder, major depression, and bipolar disorder.

== Discography ==
=== Studio albums ===
Title	Album details	Peak chart positions
Title	Album details	KOR
Growing Pains	Released: March 11, 2010; Label: Hiphopplaya; Formats: CD, download	—
Upgrade II	Released: July 22, 2011; Label: Hiphopplaya; Formats: CD, download	—
Vintage Swings	Released: October 28, 2014; Label: Just Music; Formats: CD, download	—
Levitate 2	Released: October 11, 2016; Label: Just Music; Formats: CD, download	—
Upgrade III	Released: March 24, 2018; Label: Just Music; Formats: CD, download	44
Upgrade 0	Released: December 26, 2018; Label: Just Music; Formats: CD, download	61
Upgrade IV	Released: March 4, 2020; Label: Just Music; Formats: CD, download	46
"—" denotes release did not chart.

=== Extended plays ===
Title	Album details	Peak chart positions
Title	Album details	KOR
Upgrade	Released: May 14, 2008; Label: Kakao M; Formats: CD, download	—
Mood Swings II Part 1: Major Depression (감정기복 II Part 1: 주요 우울증)	Released: February 26, 2014; Label: Brand New Music; Formats: CD, download	31
Mood Swings II Part 2: Obsessive Compulsive Disorder (감정기복 II Part 2: 강박증)	Released: July 17, 2014; Label: Brand New Music; Formats: CD, download	—
Mood Swings II Part 3: Psychotherapy (감정기복 II Part 3: 심리치료)	Released: September 8, 2016; Label: Just Music; Formats: CD, download	—
The Intr0	Released: November 30, 2018; Label: Just Music; Formats: CD, download	—
"—" denotes release did not chart.

=== Mixtapes ===
Title	Album details
#1 Mixtape Vol. II	Released: February 27, 2013; Label: Brand New Music; Formats: CD, download
#1 Vol. II Instrumental	Released: June 12, 2013; Label: Brand New Music; Formats: CD, download
Levitate 1	Released: October 11, 2016; Label: Just Music; Formats: CD, download
Levitate 3	Released: October 11, 2016; Label: Just Music; Formats: CD, download
Crumbs (부스러기)	Released: May 19, 2018; Label: Just Music; Formats: CD, download

=== Charted singles ===
Title	Year	Peak chart positions	Sales (DL)	Album
Title	Year	KOR	Sales (DL)	Album
As lead artist
"Instincively Remix" (본능적으로 Remix) feat. Yoon Jong-shin, Taeyang	2011	59	KOR: 173,772	Non-album singles
"I'll Be There" feat. Jay Park	2011	79	KOR: 51,112	Non-album singles
"Would You" (줄래) feat. Seo In-guk	2013	28	KOR: 140,819	Non-album singles
"A Real Lady" feat. Beenzino, Gray, Zion.T	2013	9	KOR: 315,639	Non-album singles
"Bulldozer" (불도저)	2014	36	KOR: 107,638	Non-album singles
"Victorious" (이겨낼거야 2) feat. Gray	2014	57	KOR: 72,168	Mood Swings II Part. 1: Major Depression
"Fallin'" feat. Jay Park	2014	23	KOR: 74,526	Non-album singles
"The Wrong Way" (역주행) feat. Dok2, Genius Nochang	2014	73	KOR: 54,410	Non-album singles
"Her Number" (전화번호) feat. Verbal Jint, 40	2014	9	KOR: 402,617	Mood Swings II Part. 2: Obsessive Compulsive Disorder
"Gravity" feat. Mad Clown, Giriboy	2014	34	KOR: 109,911	Mood Swings II Part. 2: Obsessive Compulsive Disorder
"Pool Party"	2014	14	KOR: 155,919	Non-album singles
"Rap Star"	2014	85	KOR: 26,048	Non-album singles
"My Ballad" feat. Kim Ye-rim	2014	60	KOR: 31,942	Vintage Swings
"Your Soul"	2016	98	KOR: 20,383	Non-album single
"On My Way" feat. Gray, Bewhy	2016	94	KOR: 28,684	Mood Swings II Part. 3: Psychotherapy
"Clock Out" (퇴근) feat. Jay Park, Crush	2017	88	KOR: 20,596	Non-album single
Collaborations
"Money" with P-Type	2013	—	KOR 24,025	Non-album singles
"Brilliant Is..." with Skull, Haha, Geeks, Zico, Mad Clown, Double K, Zizo, Soul Dive, Heo Kyung-hwan, Kim Ji-min feat. Gill, Jungin	2013	75	—N/a	Non-album singles
"A Real Man" with Ailee	2014	4	KOR: 509,564	Non-album singles
"Trap" with U Sung-eun	2014	27	KOR: 91,161	My Secret Hotel OST
"Not Enough" with Kid Milli and Mad Clown featuring Yumdda and pH-1	2019	37		Show Me the Money 8 Episode 1
"—" denotes releases that did not chart.

== Filmography ==
=== Television ===
Year	Program	Network	Notes/Ref.
2013	Show Me the Money 2	Mnet	Contestant
2014	Show Me the Money 3	Mnet	Judge/Producer with San E
2017	High School Rapper	Mnet	Judge
2017	Mix Nine	JTBC	Rap Instructor
2018	Show Me the Money 777	Mnet	Judge
2019	Show Me the Money 8	Mnet	Judge
2020	Show Me the Money 9	Mnet	Contestant (4th)

=== Variety shows ===
Year	Title	Network	Role	Notes/Ref.
2019	Not the Same Person You Used to Know	Mnet	Main Guest	With Giriboy, Han Yo-han (rapper, songwriter), Superbee (rapper), Kwon Hyuk-soo, Im Bo-ra (Swings' girlfriend), Jenny Kim (Swings' mother) Episode 4
2020	King of Mask Singer	MBC	Contestant	as "Advent of a Bill-god" (Episodes 259–260)
