= Genius Nochang =

South Korean rapper (born 1991)

Nochang 노창중
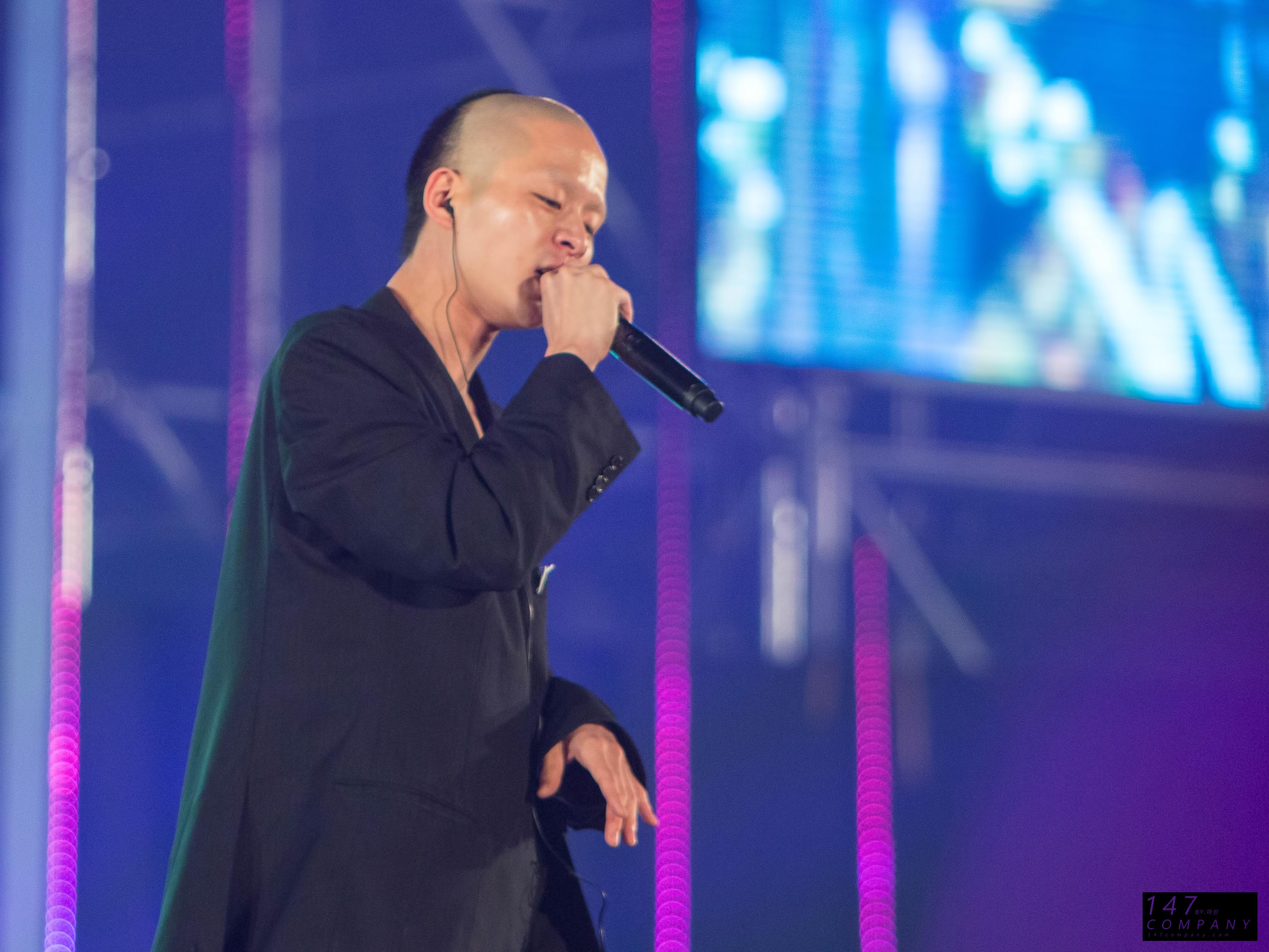

Background information
- Birth name: No Chang-joong
- Born: September 24, 1991 (age 33); Incheon Metropolitan City, South Korea
- Genres: Hip-hop
- Occupation: Rapper
- Instrument: Vocals
- Years active: 2010–present
- Labels: Just Music
- Website: wejustmusic.com

- Genius Nochang
- Hangul: 노창중
- RR: No Changjung
- MR: No Ch'angjung

No Chang-joong (Korean: 노창중, born September 24, 1991), better known by his stage name Genius Nochang (그냥노창), is a South Korean rapper. He released his first album, Remember When, on July 27, 2010.

== Discography ==
=== Studio albums ===
Title	Album details	Peak chart positions	Sales
Title	Album details	KOR	Sales
Remember When (기억시옷)	Released: July 27, 2010; Label: Inplanet; Formats: CD, digital download	—	—
My New Instagram: Mesurechiffon	Released: June 23, 2015; Label: Just Music, LOEN Entertainment; Formats: CD, digital download	—	—

=== Singles ===
Title	Year	Peak chart positions	Sales (DL)	Album
Title	Year	KOR	Sales (DL)	Album
As lead artist
"You Can Feel Everythin'"	2010	—	—	Remember When
"Muah Beautiful" (무와뷰이풀)	2012	—	—	non-album singles
"Wouldn't Have Faked a Laugh" (억지로웃지않ㄹ위치 ㄹ)	2013	—	—	non-album singles
"Hong Kiyoung #1"	2013	—	—	non-album singles
"All Day" feat. Tablo	2015	82	KOR: 36,915	non-album singles
"We Are The World" (위아더월드) feat.	2015	—	KOR: 14,860	My New Instagram: Mesurechiffon
"Hip Hop" (힙합)	2015	—	—	non-album singles
"God" feat. Seulong, Shin Ji-soo, Lovey, Sin Bo-hye, Jeon Hyo-jin	2015	—	—	non-album singles
Collaborations
"Hong Kiyoung #2" with Swings, Giriboy	2014	—	—	non-album singles
"Just" feat. Swings, Giriboy, Vasco, C Jamm	2014	—	—	non-album singles
"Hieut" (히읗) with Junggigo, Vasco feat. No.Mercy contestants	2015	—	—	non-album singles
"Indigo Child" with Vasco, Black Nut, C Jamm	2016	—	KOR: 19,046	non-album singles
"Eum Eum" (음음) feat. Goretexx, Giriboy, Black Nut, Bill Stax, Swings	2017	—	—	non-album singles
"—" denotes releases that did not chart.
