= Ja Mezz =

South Korean musician

Ja Mezz 김성희
- Born: Kim Sung-hee; August 11, 1989 (age 37); Wonju, South Korea
- Genre: Hip hop
- Occupation: Rapper
- Instrument: Vocals
- Years active: 2014–present
- Label: Grandline Entertainment

Korean name
- Hangul: 김성희
- RR: Gim Seonghui
- MR: Kim Sŏnghŭi

Kim Sung-hee (Korean: 김성희, born August 11, 1989), better known by his stage name Ja Mezz (자메즈), is a South Korean rapper. He released his first EP, 1/4, on August 11, 2015. He dropped out Hanyang University in 2017.

In August 2018, he participated in Japanese MC/Singer, Mitsuhiro Hidaka's song, "Name Tag".

== Discography ==
=== Extended plays ===
Title	Album details	Peak chart positions	Sales
Title	Album details	KOR	Sales
1/4	Released: August 11, 2015; Label: Grandline Entertainment, LOEN Entertainment; Formats: CD, digital download	63	—N/a

=== Singles ===
Title	Year	Peak chart positions	Sales (DL)	Album
Title	Year	KOR	Sales (DL)	Album
As lead artist
"Wanna Get (Oasis Part 2)"	2014	—	—N/a	Non-album singles
"Sloth" (나무늘보)	2014	—	—N/a	Non-album singles
"Audi" (아우디)	2015	—	—N/a	1/4
"Drinks Up" feat. Hwasa	2015	—	—N/a	1/4
"Hangover"	2015	—	—N/a	1/4
"Pilot"	2015	—	—N/a	1/4
"School Uniform" (복학생)	2015	—	—N/a	Non-album singles
"Commitment" (몰입)	2015	—	—N/a	Non-album singles
"Memento" feat. The Quiett	2016	—	—N/a	Non-album singles
"17" feat. C Jamm	2017	—	—N/a	Non-album singles
"Businessman in the City" (한강이 바다라면) feat. Loco, Sik-K	2017	—	—N/a	Non-album singles
"Birthday" feat. Jay Park, Dok2	2017	45	KOR: 56,414	Show Me the Money 6
"MAMA 2" feat. ALEPH skyminhyuk	2021	—	—N/a	Non-album single
Collaborations
"Turtle Ship" (거북선) with AndUp, Song Min-ho feat. Paloalto	2015	4	KOR: 813,526	Show Me the Money 4
"Life is a Gamble" (도박) with Ness, Woodie Go Child, Junoflo feat. Jay Park, Dok2	2017	19	KOR: 201,301	Show Me the Money 6
"17" Remix with Young B, No:el	2017	—	—N/a	Non-album single
"—" denotes releases that did not chart.
