= Black Nut =

South Korean rapper (born 1989)

- Also known as: MC기형아, 김좆키
- Born: Kim Dae-woong; January 1, 1989 (age 37); Jeonju, South Korea
- Genre: Korean hip hop
- Occupation: Rapper
- Label: Just Music

Korean name
- Hangul: 김대웅
- RR: Gim Daeung
- MR: Kim Taeung

Kim Dae-woong (Korean: 김대웅; born January 1, 1989), better known as Black Nut (블랙넛), is a South Korean rapper from Jeonju, North Jeolla Province, signed to hip hop record label Just Music. He reportedly acted as the record label's interim president starting in 2014, while founder Swings was enlisted in the military. Black Nut rose to fame following his controversial performances on the 2015 TV series, Show Me the Money 4.

== Show Me the Money 4 ==
Black Nut participated in Show Me the Money 4 where many notable rappers participated. He dissed Mino who was an Idol who participated in Show Me the Money 4. He was the third place of the competition, defeated by Mino.

== Sexual harassment case ==
In June 2017, female rapper KittiB filed a complaint with the Seoul District Prosecutor's Office against Black Nut for sexual harassment, including making sexually explicit comments about her during his concerts and harassing her via social media. In January 2019, the Seoul Central District Court indicted Black Nut on these charges and sentenced him to six months in prison, two years probation, and 160 hours of community service.

== Discography ==
=== Mix tapes ===
Title	Album details
Deformed	Released: 2014; Format: Digital download; Track listing: 1. since 2007; 2. 넌 뒤졌네; 3. 1000; 4. WOW; 5. 돈이 많다 난 (feat. Genius Nochang); 6. 숨이 차 7. 두 얼간이 (feat. Nuttyverse); 8. 외출하기 전 9. 여자 사귀고 싶다; 10. Smoke n Drink (feat. Genius Nochang); 11. Sex; 12. 물오징어; 13. Bad VOGUE (with Genius Nochang); 14. 5 O'Clock; 15. 금요일 밤 16. 돌아왔음 좋겠어 (by 노지노 with Black Nut)
Malformed	Released: 2015; Format: Digital download; Track listing: 1. 졸업앨범; 2. 기형아가 만난 걸레; 3. 꽃뱀들에게; 4. 바닐라 향기가 나 5. 내 고향 전주; 6. Jazi (feat. 홍어왕 낙도); 7. 섹스하고 싶어요..; 8. 나만 미워해 / 라임놀이; 9. 두려워; 10. 펀치라인 애비; 11. 892; 12. 번개 (feat. 노지노); 13. 친구 엄마; 14. 열등감; 15. 호모; 16. 브레인 데미쥐 2 (feat. 노지노); 17. 내가 할 수 있는건; 18. 우동 먹으면서; 19. 박느노느기형아 (feat. 박느님 and 노지노)

=== Singles ===
Title	Year	Peak chart positions	Sales	Album
Title	Year	KOR	Sales	Album
As lead artist
"100" feat. Genius Nochang	2014	94	—N/a	Non-album singles
"Beenzino" (빈지노)	2014	87	KOR: 28,949	Non-album singles
"Baechigi" (배치기)	2015	—	KOR: 32,135	No Diss single album
"What I Can Do" (내가 할 수 있는 건) feat. Jessi	2015	12	KOR: 339,052	Show Me the Money 4 OST
"Gagalive" (가가라이브) feat. 175.211.*.*	2015	72	KOR: 30,405	Non-album single
"80,000 Won" (8만원)	2016	91	KOR: 31,433	PPP single album
Collaborations
"My Zone" with Basick, Microdot, feat. San E, Verbal Jint	2015	12	KOR: 228,256	Show Me the Money 4 OST
"M.I.L.E. (Make It Look Easy)" with San E, Verbal Jint	2015	22	KOR: 153,439	Show Me the Money 4 OST
"Indigo Child" with Bill Stax, C Jamm, Genius Nochang	2016	—	KOR: 19,046	Non-album single
"Umm Umm" (음음) with Goretexx, Giriboy, Bill Stax, Genius Nochang, Swings	2017	—	—N/a	We Effect
"Carnival Gang" (카니발갱) with Goretexx, Giriboy, Bill Stax, Genius Nochang, Swings	2017	—	—N/a	We Effect
"Hop On" with Goretexx (as Silky Bois)	2018	—	—N/a	Silky Bois Volume One
"There She Goes" with Goretexx (as Silky Bois)	2018	—	—N/a	Silky Bois Volume One
"IMJMWDP" with Giriboy, Noel, Young B, Osshun Gun, Justhis, Jvcki Wai, Kid Milli, Han Yo-han, Swings	2019	—	—N/a	Non-album singles
"Gratata" (그라타타) with Han Yo-han and Swings	2019	179	—N/a	Non-album singles
"—" denotes release did not chart.

== Awards ==
=== Hiphopplaya Awards ===
Year	Category	Nominated work	Result	Ref
2012	Rising Star of Next Year	Black Nut	Nominated	
2013	Rising Star of Next Year	Black Nut	Won	
2014	Rising Star of Next Year	Black Nut	Won	
2014	Single of the Year	"100" (feat. Genius Nochang)	Nominated	
