= Bewhy =

South Korean rapper (born 1993)

BewhY 이병윤
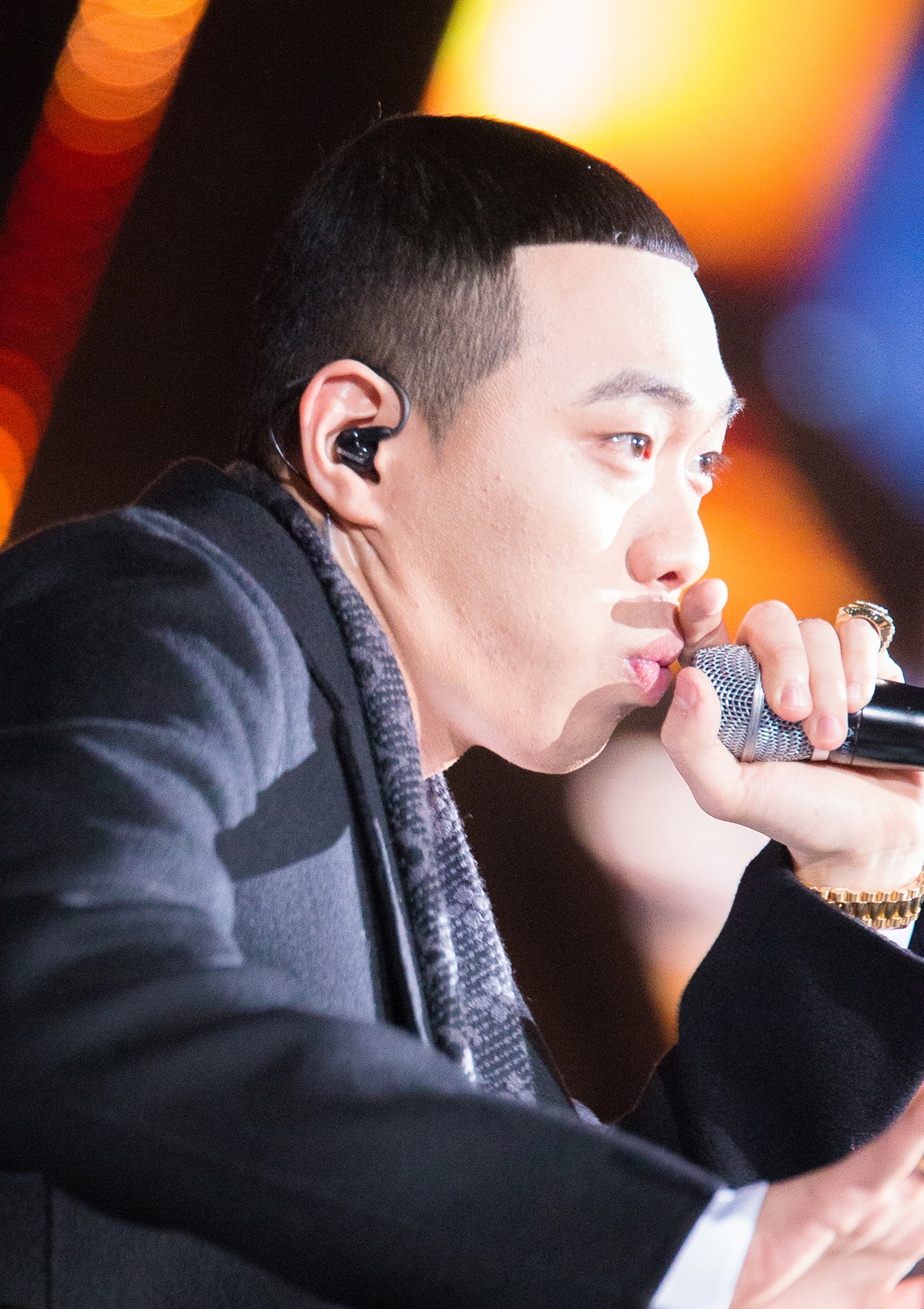
- BewhY performing in 2016

Background information
- Born: Lee Byung-yoon; June 15, 1993 (age 33); Daejeon, South Korea
- Genres: Hip hop; Korean hip hop; Christian hip hop
- Occupations: Rapper; record producer; MC
- Instruments: Vocals; keyboards
- Years active: 2012–present
- Label: Dejavu Group
- Member of: $exy $treet & Yello Music
- Spouse: Lee Eun-hyun (m. 2020–present)

Korean name
- Hangul: 이병윤
- RR: I Byeongyun
- MR: I Pyŏngyun

Lee Byung-yoon (Korean: 이병윤; born June 15, 1993), better known by his stage name BewhY (비와이), is a South Korean rapper and member of the $exy $treet & Yello Music crew. He gained recognition after winning Show Me the Money 5 in 2016.

== Early life and education ==
Lee Byung-yoon was born on June 15, 1993, in Daejeon, South Korea, and raised in Incheon. He has one older brother. During his first year of high school, he developed an interest in becoming a rapper and making music.

== Influences ==
Lee credits South Korean hip hop group Dynamic Duo as an influence on his music, as well as Kanye West, Kendrick Lamar, Jay-Z, Chance the Rapper, and Daft Punk.

He has also stated that his rap skills have been influenced by gospel music and funk.

== Personal life ==
Lee is known for being a devout Protestant Christian and has referenced his faith in many songs.

In October 2020, Lee married his longtime partner, Lee Eun-hyun, whom he had been dating for eight years. The two met at church when they were both 20 years old. On January 13, 2023, his wife gave birth to their first child, a daughter.

Lee enlisted in the South Korean military on August 23, 2021, where he served as a Marine Corps police officer for the Korea Coast Guard. He was discharged on April 22, 2023.

== Discography ==
=== Studio albums ===
Title	Album details	Peak chart positions	Sales
Title	Album details	KOR	Sales
Time Travel	Released: March 10, 2015; Label: Sexy Street & Yello Music, Luminant Entertainment; Formats: CD, digital download	—	—N/a
The Blind Star	Released: September 17, 2017; Label: Dejavu Group, LOEN Entertainment; Formats: CD, digital download	13	KOR: 1,454
The Movie Star	Released: July 25, 2019; Label: Dejavu Group, LOEN Entertainment; Formats: CD, digital download	38	KOR: 1,000
"—" denotes releases that did not chart.

=== EPs ===
Title	Album details	Peak chart positions	Sales
Title	Album details	KOR	Sales
The Blind Star 0.5	Released: September 3, 2017; Label: Dejavu Group, LOEN Entertainment; Formats: CD, digital download	—	—N/a
NEO CHRISTIAN	Released: June 15, 2020; Label: Dejavu Group; Formats: CD, digital download	—N/a	—N/a
032 Funk	Released: July 30, 2021; Label: Dejavu Group; Formats: CD, digital download	N/A	N/A
"—" denotes releases that did not chart.

=== Mixtapes ===
Title	Album details
Be the Livest	Released: September 18, 2012; Formats: digital download

=== Singles ===
Title	Year	Peak chart positions	Sales (DL)	Album
Title	Year	KOR	Sales (DL)	Album
As lead artist
"Waltz"	2014	—	—N/a	Non-album singles
"Swimming Bananas" feat. Keebo	2014	—	—N/a	Non-album singles
"The Time Goes On"	2015	17	KOR: 716,690	Time Travel
"In Trinity"	2015	—	—N/a	Non-album singles
"Shalom"	2016	—	—N/a	Non-album singles
"Forever"	2016	2	KOR: 918,132	Show Me the Money 5
"Day Day" feat. Jay Park	2016	2	KOR: 1,039,009	Show Me the Money 5
"Fake" (자화상 part 2)	2016	39	KOR: 107,437	Show Me the Money 5
"Dejavu"	2017	32	KOR: 87,163	The Blind Star
"Hewgeso" (휴게소)	2017	73	KOR: 30,475	The Blind Star
"Scar" (흔적)	2017	—	KOR: 17,015	The Blind Star 0.5
"Red Carpet"	2017	44	KOR: 38,269	The Blind Star 0.5
"My Star"	2017	64	KOR: 32,722	The Blind Star
"Gottasadae" (가라사대)	2019	63	—N/a	The Movie Star
Collaborations
"Freezing" (얼어) with Bill Stax, C Jamm, Konsoul & Scary'P	2015	—	—N/a	Non-album single
"I'm Not the Person You Used to Know" (니가 알던 내가 아냐) with Simon Dominic, One, G2	2016	2	KOR: 751,667	Show Me the Money 5
"XamBaqJa" (쌈박자) with Simon Dominic	2016	29	KOR: 110,830	Show Me the Money 5
"Puzzle" with C Jamm	2016	3	KOR: 697,668	Non-album single
"International Wave" with Talib Kweli	2016	64	KOR: 50,305	Non-album single
"Someday" with Asura	2016	100	KOR: 18,164	Non-album single
"Uno" (우노) with Big K.R.I.T.	2017	97	KOR: 15,380	Non-album single
"Like Me" with A$AP TyY & C Jamm	2017	—	—N/a	Non-album single
"Karma" with Babylon, Verbal Jint, the Quiett, TakeOne, Nucksal	2018	—	—N/a	Caelo
"Side by Side"	2020	—	—N/a	Sweet Home
"—" denotes releases that did not chart.

== Filmography ==
=== Television series ===
Year	Title	Network	Role	Notes	Ref.
2018	Suits	KBS2	Himself	Cameo ep. 3-4	
2021	The Penthouse: War in Life 3	SBS	Lee Byung-hoon	Cameo ep. 14	

=== Variety shows ===
Year	Network	Program	Notes
2015	Mnet	Show Me the Money 4	Contestant
2016	Mnet	Show Me the Money 5	Contestant, Winner of Season 5
2018	Mnet	The Call	Cast
2019	Mnet	Show Me the Money 8	Judge
2020	Mnet	Show Me the Money 9	Judge

== Awards and nominations ==
Year	Award	Category	Nominated work	Result	Ref.
2016	Melon Music Awards	Top Ten Artists	—N/a	Won	
2016	Mnet Asian Music Awards	Best Rap Performance	"Puzzle" (with C Jamm)	Won	
2017	Gaon Chart Music Awards	Discovery of the Year (Hip Hop)	—N/a	Won	
2017	Korean Music Awards	Rookie of the Year	—N/a	Nominated	
2017	Korean Music Awards	Best Hip Hop Song	"Forever"	Won	
2017	Korean Hip-hop Awards	Artist of the Year	—N/a	Nominated	
2017	Korean Hip-hop Awards	Hip Hop Track of the Year	"Forever"	Won	
2017	Korean Hip-hop Awards	Collaboration of the Year	"₩ 1,000,000" (with G-Dragon, Okasian and CL)	Nominated	
2020	Korean Hip-hop Awards	Hip Hop Track of the Year	"Gottasadae"	Nominated	
2020	Korean Hip-hop Awards	Music Video of the Year	"Gottasadae"	Nominated	
2020	Korean Music Awards	Best Rap & Hip Hop Song	"Gottasadae"	Nominated	
