= Ahn Byeong-woong =

South Korean rapper (born 1999)

Ahn Byeong-woong 안병웅
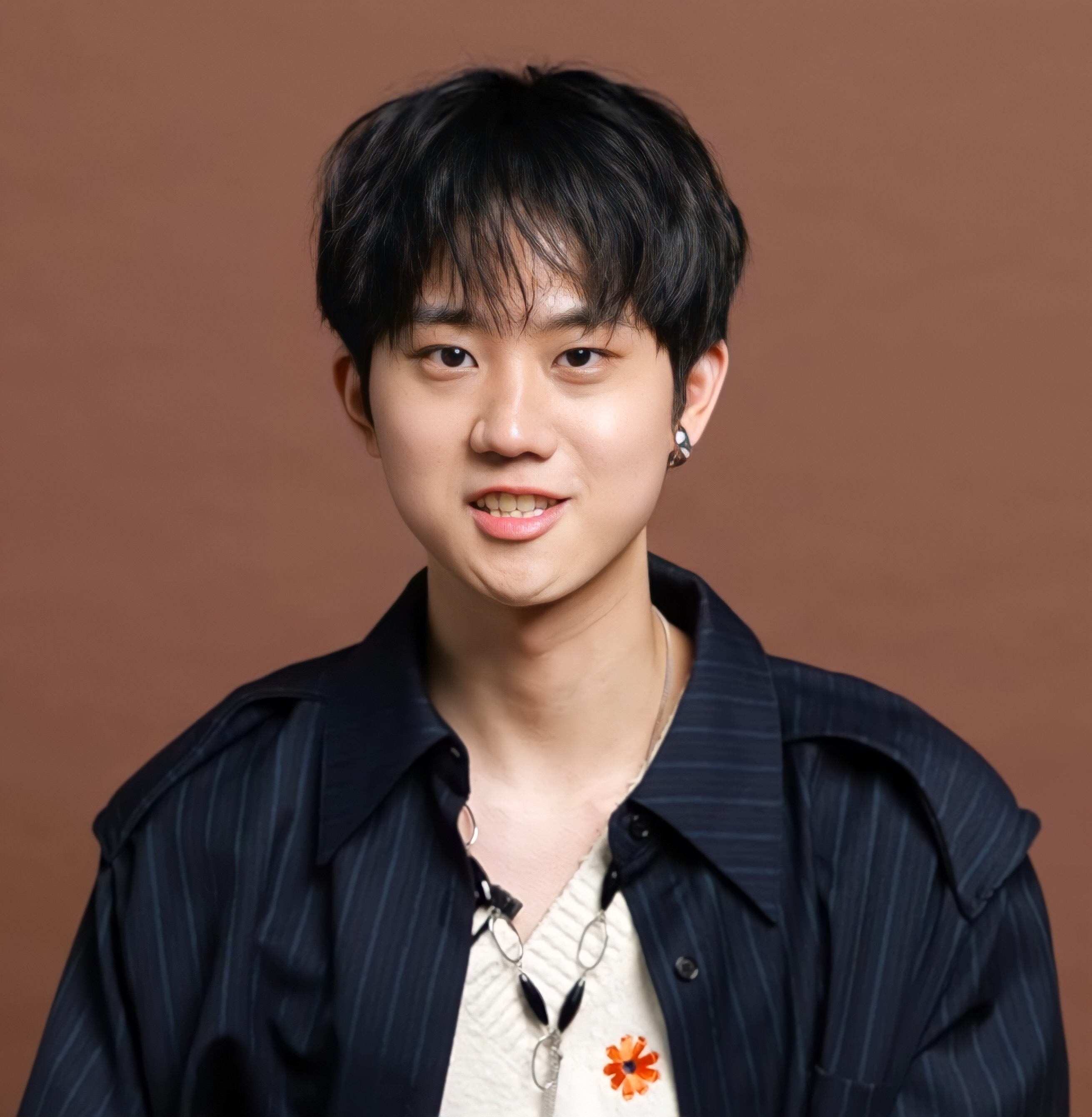
- Ahn in 2022

Background information
- Born: August 23, 1999 (age 27); Siheung, South Korea
- Genre: Boom bap
- Occupation: Rapper
- Years active: 2019-present
- Label: Wavy

Ahn Byeong-woong (Korean: 안병웅; born August 23, 1999) is a South Korean rapper. He garnered attention when he appeared on Show Me the Money 8 in 2019.

== Early life and education ==
Ahn was born on August 23, 1999, in Siheung. He began rapping in high school. He won Rookies of KAC in 2017 and became the runner-up of Open Mic Swg in 2018.

He graduated from East Incheon High School.

== Career ==
Ahn garnered attention when he appeared on Show Me the Money 8 in 2019. In March 2020, he signed to Wavy. In April, he released his debut EP Bartoon 24.

== Artistry ==
Ahn is known for his boom bap style and sharp tone. He was influenced by Biggie Smalls' method of using and placing words and creating rhythm.

== Discography ==
=== EP ===
Title	Details	Peak chart position
Title	Details	KOR
Bartoon 24	Released: April 13, 2020; Label: Wavy; Format: Streaming	—
Batanga	Released: March 6, 2021; Label: Wavy; Format: CD, Streaming	71
Hook up	Released: July 24, 2022; Label: Wavy; Format: CD, steaming	52

== Filmography ==
=== TV ===
Year	Title	Role	Ref.
2019	Show Me the Money 8	Contestant	
2020	Show Me the Money 9	Contestant	
2021	Show Me the Money 10	Contestant	

== Awards and nominations ==
Award	Year	Nominee	Category	Result	Ref.
Korean Hip-hop Awards	2023	"Peace Out (Mega Mix)" (Blase feat. Ahn Byeong-woong)	Collaboration of the Year	Nominated	
