= C Jamm =

South Korean rapper (born 1993)

C Jamm 류성민
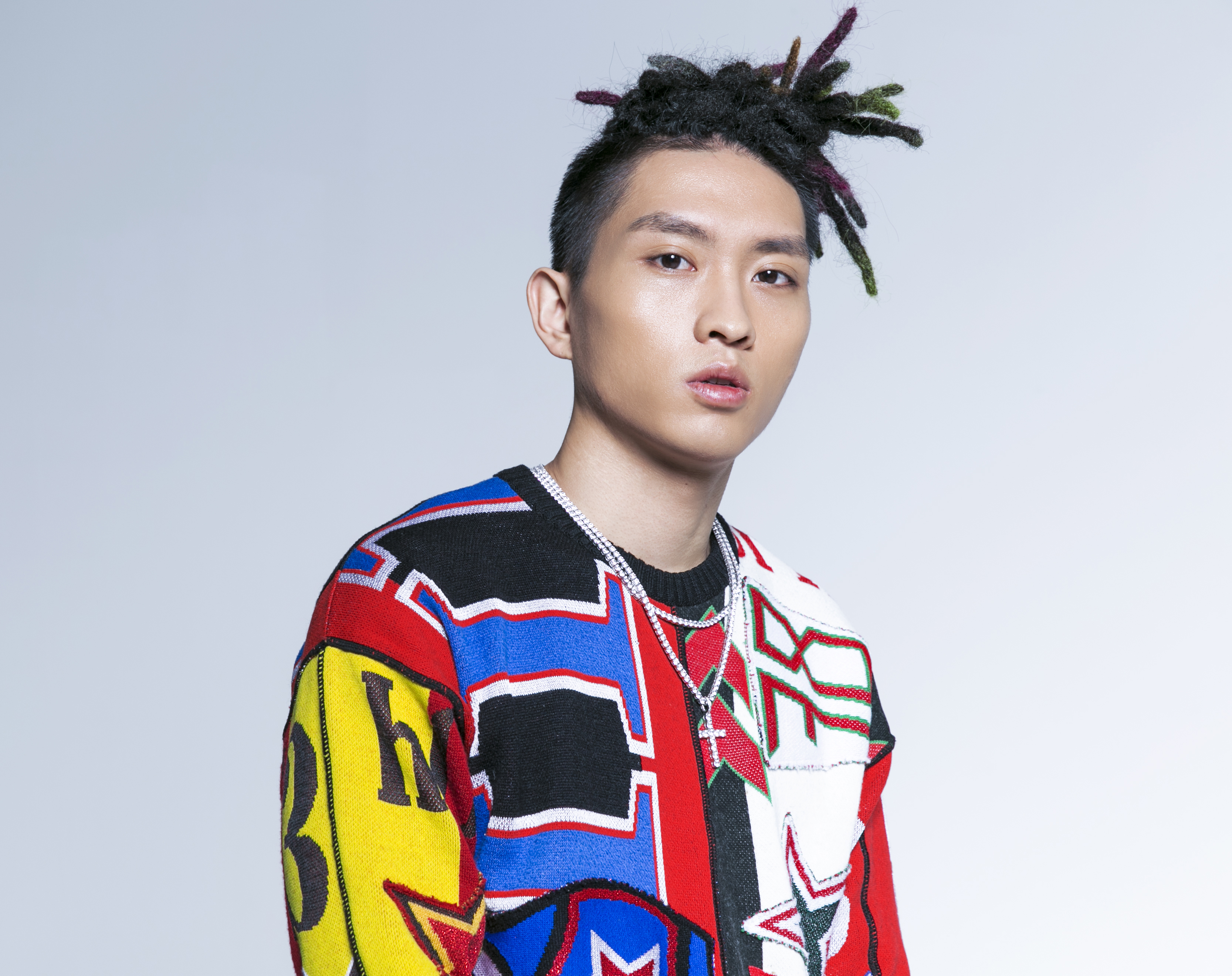
- C Jamm in 2016

Background information
- Born: Ryu Sung-min; February 28, 1993 (age 33); Jeju City, Jeju, South Korea
- Genres: Hip-hop; Rap
- Occupation: Rapper
- Instrument: Vocals
- Years active: 2012–present

- C Jamm
- Hangul: 류성민
- RR: Ryu Seongmin
- MR: Ryu Sŏngmin

Ryu Sung-min (Korean: 류성민; born February 28, 1993), better known by his stage name C Jamm (씨잼), is a South Korean rapper. He released his debut album, Good Boy Doing Bad Things on July 17, 2015. He is the runner-up of Show Me the Money 5, behind the winner, his childhood friend, Bewhy. On 3 March 2022, after his release of EP, he left his label, Just Music.

== Discography ==
=== Studio albums ===
Title	Album details	Peak chart positions	Sales
Title	Album details	KOR	Sales
Good Boy Doing Bad Things	Released: July 17, 2015; Label: Just Music; Format: CD, digital download	32	KOR: 416
Keung (킁)	Released: May 16, 2019; Label: Just Music; Format: CD, digital download	29	KOR: 5,011
Ghenn (걘)	Released: March 3, 2022; Label: Just Music; Format: CD, digital download		

=== Mixtapes ===
Title	Album details
What The Nice	Released: November 16, 2012; Label: Self-released; Format: Digital download
Go So Yello	Released: November 14, 2013; Label: $exy $treet & Yello Music; Format: Digital download

=== Singles ===
Title	Year	Peak chart positions	Sales (DL)	Album
Title	Year	KOR	Sales (DL)	Album
As lead artist
"A Yo"	2013	—	—N/a	Go So Yello
"Young & Hottest" feat. Olltii & Jay Moon	2013	—	—N/a	Go So Yello
"Yello Card" feat. Keebo & BewhY	2013	—	—N/a	Go So Yello
"Good Day" feat. Swings	2014	—	KOR: 17,030	Show Me the Money 3
"Shit"	2014	—	KOR: 20,526	Show Me the Money 3
"Good Night"	2014	—	—N/a	Good Boy Doing Bad Things
"Just Music" (걍 음악이다) feat. Vasco, Genius Nochang & BewhY	2015	—	—N/a	Good Boy Doing Bad Things
"Pr0ve"	2016	—	—N/a	Non-album single
"Beautiful" (아름다워) feat. Zico	2016	8	KOR: 314,516	Show Me the Money 5
"MM"	2016	92	KOR: 53,941	Show Me the Money 5
"Let It Be" (재방송) feat. Crush	2016	51	KOR: 93,256	Show Me the Money 5
"Know"	2017	—	—N/a	Non-album single
Collaborations
"Rain Showers" with Swings & Giriboy	2014	—	—N/a	Ripple Effect
"Go Straight" (난 앞으로만) with Swings, Giriboy, Vasco & Genius Nochang	2014	—	—N/a	Ripple Effect
"Just" with Swings, Giriboy & Vasco	2014	—	—N/a	Ripple Effect
"More" (더) with Genius Nochang Swings & Vasco	2014	—	—N/a	Ripple Effect
"Royal Roader" (로열로더) with Vasco	2015	—	KOR: 13,408	Non-album singles
"Wassup" with Doplamingo	2015	—	—N/a	Non-album singles
"Freezing" (얼어) with Bill Stax, BewhY, Konsoul & Scary'P	2015	—	—N/a	Non-album singles
"Indigo Child" with Bill Stax, Black Nut & Genius Nochang	2016	—	KOR: 19,046	Non-album singles
"$insa" (신사) with Zion.T, Reddy, Xitsuh	2016	4	KOR: 493,535	Show Me the Money 5
"Wanted" (현상수배) Reddy	2016	13	KOR: 309,144	Show Me the Money 5
"Puzzle" with BewhY	2016	3	KOR: 697,668	Non-album singles
"Like Me" with A$AP TyY & BewhY	2017	—	—N/a	Non-album singles
"Killa Dreads" with Skull	2017	—	—N/a	Non-album singles
"GOAT" with Bill Stax, Swings	2017	—	—N/a	Non-album singles
"—" denotes releases that did not chart.

== Awards and nominations ==
Year	Award	Category	Nominated work	Result	Ref.
2016	Mnet Asian Music Awards	Best Rap Performance	"Puzzle" (with Bewhy)	Won	
2020	Korean Hip-hop Awards	Hip Hop Album of the Year	Keung	Won	
2020	Korean Hip-hop Awards	Artist of the Year	—N/a	Nominated	
2020	Korean Hip-hop Awards	Hip Hop Track of the Year	"Pokerface"	Nominated	
2020	Korean Music Awards	Album of the Year	Keung	Nominated	
2020	Korean Music Awards	Best Rap & Hip Hop Album	Keung	Won	
