= Olltii =

South Korean rapper

Olltii 정우성
- Born: Jung Woo-sung; January 2, 1996 (age 30); South Korea
- Genre: Hip hop
- Occupation: Rapper
- Instrument: Vocals
- Years active: 2013–present
- Label: C9 Entertainment

Korean name
- Hangul: 정우성
- RR: Jeong Useong
- MR: Chŏng Usŏng

Jung Woo-sung (Korean: 정우성, born January 2, 1996), better known by his stage name Olltii (올티), is a South Korean rapper. He was a contestant on Show Me the Money 3. He released his first album, Graduation, on February 24, 2015.

== Discography ==
=== Studio albums ===
Title	Album details	Peak chart positions	Sales
Title	Album details	KOR	Sales
Graduation (졸업)	Released: February 25, 2015; Label: C9 Entertainment, CJ E&M; Formats: CD, digital download	30	KOR: 637

=== Singles ===
Title	Year	Peak chart positions	Sales (DL)	Album
Title	Year	KOR	Sales (DL)	Album
As lead artist
"Quickly" (빨라)	2013	—	—N/a	Non-album singles
"Up" (올라) feat.	2013	—	—N/a	Non-album singles
"Oll' Ready"	2014	23	KOR: 197,802	Show Me the Money 3
"That XX" (그 XX) feat. Zico	2014	32	KOR: 192,078	Show Me the Money 3
"Oll' Skool"	2014	—	KOR: 16,866	Graduation
"Uneasy" (설레) feat. Baek Ye-rin	2015	34	KOR: 96,577	Graduation
"Graduation" (졸업 (이젠 안녕))	2015	—	KOR: 11,778	Graduation
"Zero Gravity" (무중력) feat. Dalchong, Jacoby Planet	2015	64	KOR: 31,769	Non-album singles
"GBPG"	2016	—	—N/a	Non-album singles
"Cigarette" (담배) feat. Car, the garden	2017	—	—N/a	Non-album singles
Collaborations
"SRS 2015" with JJK, Lupi, Xitsuh, DJ Kendrickx	2015	—	—N/a	Non-album single
"S.M.T.M (Show Me The Money)" with Sleepy, Hash Swan, Black Nine, Punchnello, Penomeco, Ignito, Dok2	2017	82	KOR: 45,420	Show Me the Money 6
"SRS 2017" with JJK, Lugoh, DJ Kendrickx	2017	—	—N/a	Non-album single
As featuring artist
"To Reach You" (너에게 닿기까지) Heejin (Good Day) feat. Olltii	2015	—	—N/a	Non-album single
"—" denotes releases that did not chart.
