= Bill Stax =

South Korean rapper

Bill Stax 신동열
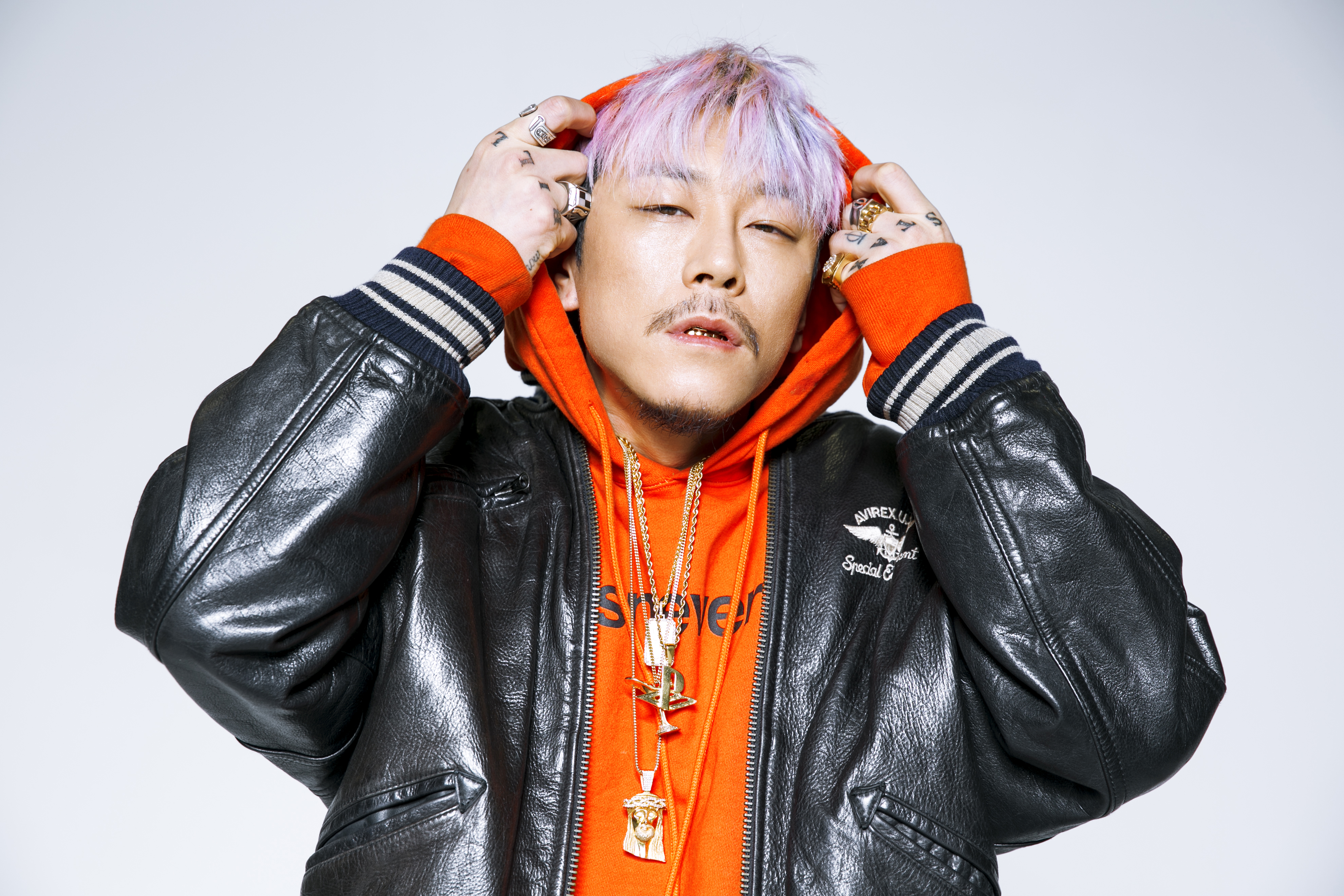

Background information
- Also known as: Vasco
- Born: Shin Dong-yeol; December 18, 1980 (age 45); Seoul, South Korea
- Genre: Hip hop
- Occupation: Rapper
- Instrument: Vocals
- Years active: 2000–present
- Label: ATM Seoul

- Bill Stax
- Hangul: 신동열
- RR: Sin Dongyeol
- MR: Sin Tongyŏl

Shin Dong-yeol (Korean: 신동열; born December 18, 1980), better known by his stage name Bill Stax (Korean: 빌스택스), previously known as Vasco (바스코), is a South Korean rapper. He was a contestant on Show Me the Money 3. He released his first album, The Genesis, on July 13, 2004.

== Discography ==
=== Studio albums ===
Title	Album details
The Genesis	Released: July 13, 2004; Label: Master Plan Production, NHN Entertainment; Formats: CD, digital download
Oh Come On World (덤벼라 세상아)	Released: September 11, 2007; Label: Master Plan Production, NHN Entertainment; Formats: CD, digital download
Guerrilla Muzik Vol.1 – Prologue	Released: March 28, 2011; Label: Hip Hop Playa; Formats: CD, digital download
Guerrilla Muzik Vol. 3 'Exodos'	Released: May 1, 2013; Label: Independent Records, Genuine Music; Formats: CD, digital download
DETOX	Released: April 8, 2020; Label: ATM Seoul, YG Entertainment; Formats: Tape, digital download, LP

=== Extended plays ===
Title	Album details
Code Name :187	Released: February 6, 2014; Label: Molotov, NHN Entertainment; Formats: CD, digital download
How You Doing?	Released: April 7, 2014; Label: Just Music, NHN Entertainment; Formats: CD, digital download
Code Name : 211	Released: February 11, 2015; Label: Just Music, CJ E&M; Formats: CD, digital download

=== Mixtapes ===
Title	Album details
Madmax	Released: December 22, 2015; Label: Just Music, LOEN Entertainment; Formats: CD, digital download
Buffet	Released: March 3, 2017; Label: Just Music, LOEN Entertainment; Formats: CD, digital download

=== Charted singles ===
Title	Year	Peak chart positions	Sales (DL)	Album
Title	Year	KOR	Sales (DL)	Album
As lead artist
"Guerrilla's Way"	2014	74	KOR: 47,822	Show Me the Money 3
187 feat. Im Sung-hyun	2014	54	KOR: 96,207	Show Me the Money 3
"Unfinished Story" (못다한 이야기) feat. Kim Na-young	2014	—	KOR: 35,224	Show Me the Money 3
"Don" feat. The Quiett, Dok2, Genius Nochang	2014	80	KOR: 49,866	Code Name : 211
"Bonnie & Clyde" with Taewan, Jessi	2015	—	KOR: 12,675	Code Name : 211
"S.O.L.O" feat. Loco, Skull	2015	—	KOR: 16,892	Non-album single
Collaborations
"Breathe" (숨) with Shannon, Giriboy	2014	64	KOR: 38,638	Non-album single
"Royal Roader" (로열로더) with C Jamm	2015	—	KOR: 13,408	Non-album single
"Indigo Child" with Black Nut, C Jamm, Genius Nochang	2016	—	KOR: 19,046	Non-album single
"—" denotes releases that did not chart.
