= Dean (South Korean singer) discography =

Dean discography
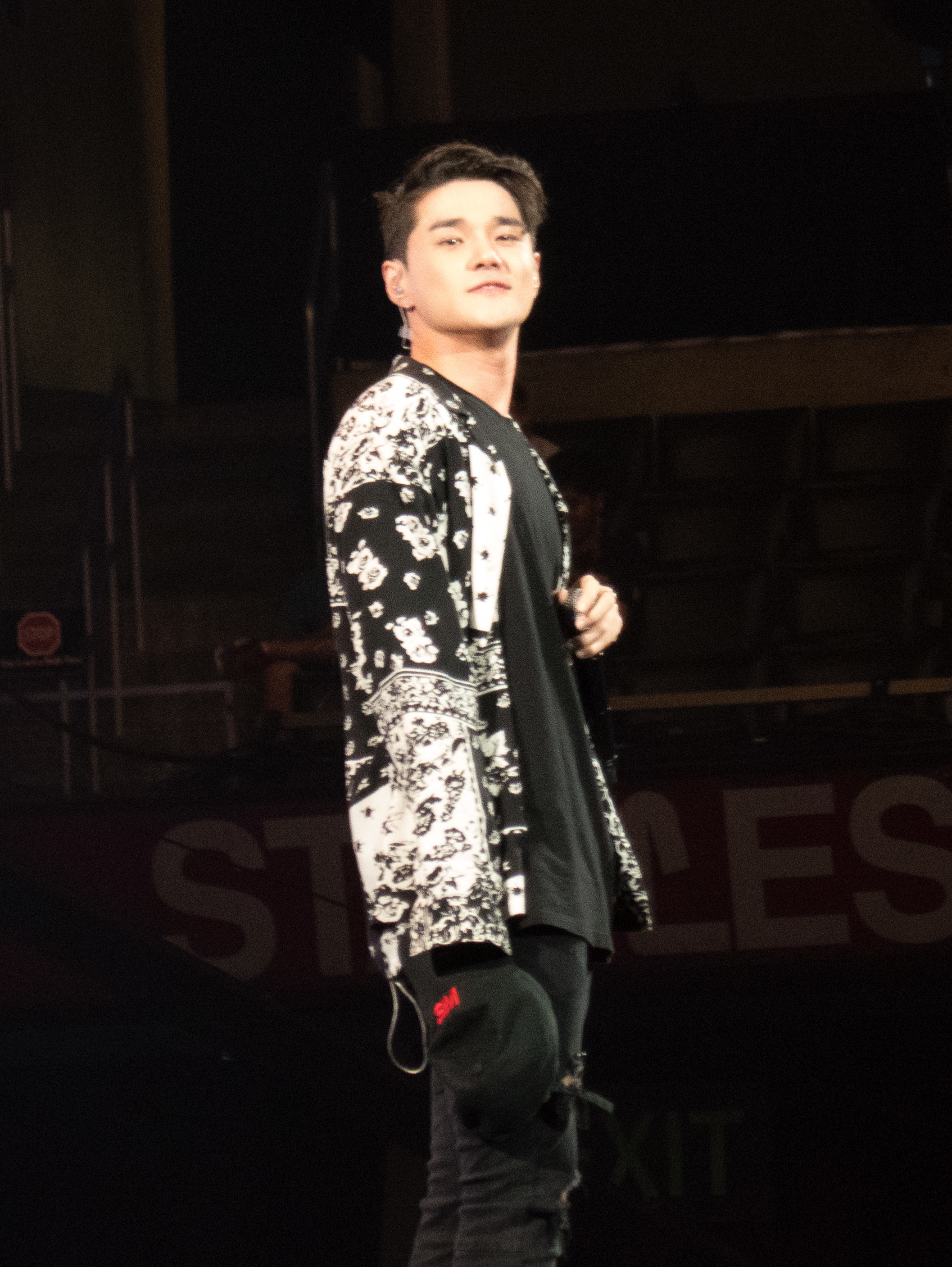
- Dean at KCON, 2016
- EPs: 1
- Singles: 35
- B-sides: 1
- Music videos: 21

Dean is a South Korean alternative R&B singer-songwriter and record producer. His discography as a singer consists of 1 extended play and 35 singles (including 16 as lead artist). Since 2015, Dean has sold more than 4.9 million digital songs in South Korea as a lead artist. He has also written songs for multiple artists including Exo, VIXX, and Block B.

== Extended plays ==
Title	Details	Peak chart position			Sales
Title	Details	KOR	US World	US Heat	Sales
130 Mood: TRBL	Released: March 24, 2016; Label: Joombas & Universal; Formats: CD, digital download	10	3	22	KOR: 22,005

== Singles ==
=== As a lead artist ===
Title	Year	Peak positions			Sales	Album
Title	Year	KOR	US World	NZ Hot	Sales	Album
"I'm Not Sorry" (featuring Eric Bellinger)	2015	— (Note: "I'm Not Sorry" did not enter the Gaon Digital Chart, but peaked at number 4 on the Gaon International Digital Chart.)	—	—	KOR: 761,469	Non-album singles
"Put My Hands On You" (featuring Anderson .Paak)	2015	—	—	—	KOR: 129,805	Non-album singles
"I Love It" (featuring Dok2)	2015	—	—	—	KOR: 24,657	130 Mood: TRBL
"Pour Up" (featuring Zico)	2015	96	—	—	KOR: 34,796	130 Mood: TRBL
"What2do" (featuring Crush and Jeff Bernat)	2016	41	—	—	KOR: 354,432	130 Mood: TRBL
"Bonnie & Clyde"	2016	—	12	—	KOR: 42,809	130 Mood: TRBL
"D (Half Moon)" (featuring Gaeko)	2016	15	—	—	KOR: 2,500,000	130 Mood: TRBL
"Come Over" (넘어와) (featuring Baek Ye-rin)	2017	6	8	—	KOR: 827,673	Limbo (single)
"Love" (featuring Syd)	2017	—	—	—	KOR: 20,052	Non-album singles
"Instagram"	2017	1	—	—	KOR: 2,500,000	Non-album singles
"Dayfly" (하루살이) (featuring Sulli and Rad Museum)	2018	37	—	—	—N/a	Non-album singles
"Howlin' 404"	2019	—	—	—	—N/a	Non-album singles
"Die 4 You"	2023	9	—	15	—N/a	Non-album singles
"NASA" (featuring French Kiwi Juice)	2024	—	—	—	—N/a	3:33 (single)
"Nocturne 07 (for aerse)" (featuring Miso)	2025	—	—	—	—N/a	Non-album single
"Aftertaste" (with Anderson .Paak)	2026	—	—	—	—N/a	K-Pops!
"—" denotes releases that did not chart or were not released in that region.

=== As a featured artist ===
Title	Year	Peak positions		Sales	Album
Title	Year	KOR	US World	Sales	Album
"요즘어때?" (How Are You These Days?) (Dynamic Duo featuring Dean)	2015	38	—	KOR: 69,188	Grand Carnival
"247" (Junggigo featuring Zion. T, Crush and Dean)	2015	14	—	KOR: 163,903	Non-album singles
"Fancy" (Paloalto featuring Dean, Sway D)	2016	—	—	KOR: 21,392	Non-album singles
"Bad Vibes Lonely" (Dok2 featuring Dean)	2016	—	—	KOR: 15,291	Non-album singles
"Shut Up & Groove" (Heize featuring Dean)	2016	27	24	KOR: 264,326	And July
"Starlight" (Taeyeon featuring Dean)	2016	5	6	KOR: 474,489	Why
"And July" (Heize featuring Dean and DJ Fritz)	2016	9	—	KOR: 2,500,000	And July
"Ain't Got Nobody" (Miryo featuring Dean)	2016	71	—	—N/a	Unpretty Rapstar 3 track 5
"No Thx" (Yuk Jidam featuring Suran and Dean)	2016	83	—	—N/a	Unpretty Rapstar 3 track 6
"Bermuda Triangle" (Zico featuring Dean, Crush)	2016	2	3	KOR: 717,231	Non-album single
"Know Me" (DPR Live featuring Dean)	2017	—	—	—N/a	Coming to You Live
"B.O.S.S" (Yammo featuring Dean, Dok2)	2017	—	—	—N/a	Non-album single
"Too Much" (Loco featuring Dean)	2017	12	—	KOR: 367,499	Bleached
"1+1=0" (Suran featuring Dean)	2017	32	—	KOR: 50,668	Walkin'
"Gold" (Off On Off featuring Dean)	2017	—	—	—N/a	Boy.
"Tiny Little Boy" (Rad Museum featuring Dean)	2017	—	—	—N/a	Scene
"Piss On Me" (2xxx! featuring Dean and Punchnello)	2017	—	—	—N/a	Life
"Francesca" (Hash Swan featuring Dean)	2018	—	—	—N/a	Alexandrite
"Jon Snow" (Swings featuring Dean)	2018	—	—	—N/a	Upgrade III
"Cold Fire" (PREP featuring Dean)	2018	—	—	—N/a	Cold Fire
"Dance with the Devil" (Ja Mezz featuring Dean)	2018	—	—	—N/a	GOØDevil
"1 Missed Call" (ROMderful featuring Dean and Tabber)	2019	—	—	—N/a	Press L To Continue
"Wake Up" (Crush featuring Dean)	2019	—	—	—N/a	From Midnight to Sunrise
"Under the Ground" (nafla featuring Dean)	2020	—	—	—N/a	u n u, Pt. 2
"Honey!" (Tabber featuring Dean)	2020	—	—	—N/a	Deep End Mix Tape
"Paranoid" (Mokyo featuring Dean)	2020	—	—	—N/a	Accent Fried
"Troll" (IU featuring Dean)	2021	10	—	—N/a	Lilac
"Off-Line" (Rad Museum featuring Dean and LeeHi)	2022	—	—	—N/a	Rad
"Sugar Dive" (Wesley Joseph featuring Dean)	2023	—	—	—N/a	Glow
"Chi-Ka" (Tabber featuring Dean)	2024	—	—	—N/a	Madness Always Turns to Sadness
"S/S" (Rad Museum and Kid Milli featuring Dean)	2024	—	—	—N/a	Rad Milli
"Burn It" (Bibi featuring Dean)	2024	—	—	—N/a	Derre (single)
"친구" (Justhis featuring Dean)	2025	—	—	—N/a	Lit
"Yin and Yang" (Zico and Crush featuring Dean and Penomeco)	2026	133	—	—N/a	Non-album single
"—" denotes releases that did not chart or were not released in that region.

=== Other charted songs ===
Title	Year	Peak positions		Sales	Album
Title	Year	KOR	US World	Sales	Album
"21"	2016	82	—	KOR: 161,332	130 mood : TRBL
"The Unknown Guest" (불청객)	2017	82	13	KOR: 31,165+	limbo (single)
"—" denotes songs that did not chart.

== Music videos ==
Year	Music video
2015	"I'm Not Sorry" (featuring Eric Bellinger)
2015	"Put My Hands on You" (featuring Anderson .Paak)
2015	"I Love It" (featuring Dok2)
2015	"Pour Up" (featuring Zico)
2016	"What2do" (featuring Crush and Jeff Bernat)
2016	"Bonnie & Clyde"
2016	"D (Half Moon) (featuring Gaeko)"
2016	"Shut Up & Groove" (Heize featuring Dean)
2016	"Starlight" (Taeyeon featuring Dean)
2016	"And July" (Heize featuring Dean and DJ Friz)
2016	"Bermuda Triangle" (Zico featuring Dean and Crush)
2017	"Come Over" (featuring Baek Yerin)
2017	"Know Me" (DPR Live featuring Dean)
2017	"Love" (featuring Syd)
2018	"Instagram"
2019	"Dayfly" (featuring Sulli and Rad Museum with additional vocals by Daniel Caesar)
2023	"Die 4 You"
2024	"Chi-Ka" (Tabber featuring Dean)
2024	"NASA" (featuring French Kiwi Juice)
2025	"Nocturne 07 (for aerse)" (featuring Miso)
2026	"Aftertaste" (with Anderson .Paak)

== Production ==
Year	Artist	Album	Song	Lyrics	Music	Notes	Ref.
2013	100%	Real 100%	"Want You Back"	Yes	No	—N/a	
2013	Exo	XOXO	"Black Pearl"	No	Yes	—N/a	
2013	VIXX	Voodoo	"Voodoo Doll"	No	Yes	—N/a	
2013	History	Blue Spring	"Hello"	Yes	Yes	—N/a	
2014	VIXX	Non-album single	"Eternity"	Yes	Yes	Production	
2014	John Park	Non-album single	"U"	Yes	Yes	—N/a	
2014	Madtown	Mad Town	"YOLO"	Yes	No	—N/a	
2015	Madtown	Welcome to Madtown	"드루와"	Yes	Yes	—N/a	
2015	Uniq	EOEO	"EOEO"	Yes	Yes	—N/a	
2015	Speed	Speed On	"What U"	Yes	No	—N/a	
2015	Chad Future	Ak-Pop	"Famous"	Yes	No	—N/a	
2015	VIXX	Chained Up	"Eternity"	Yes	Yes	Production	
2015	Dynamic Duo	Grand Carnival	"요즘어때? (How You Doin'?)"	Yes	Yes	—N/a	
2015	Exo	Sing for You	"Unfair"	Yes	Yes	—N/a	
2016	iKON (Bobby, Junhoe, Donghyuk)	Two Yoo Project Sugar Man Part 14 (song by Mose)	"사랑인걸 (It's Love)"	No	No	Arrangement	
2016	Lee Hi (featuring Mino)	Seoulite	"비행 World Tour"	Yes	Yes	—N/a	
2016	Lee Hi (featuring Bobby)	Seoulite	"Video"	Yes	Yes	—N/a	
2016	Paloalto (featuring Dean, Sway D)	Non-album single	"Fancy"	Yes	Yes	—N/a	
2016	Winner (Seungyoon, Mino, Taehyun)	Two Yoo Project Sugar Man Part 21 (song by Hey)	"쥬 뗌므 Je T'aime"	No	No	Arrangement	
2016	Boys Republic	BR:evolution	"지켜만 봐 (Eyes On Me)"	No	Yes	—N/a	
2016	Block B (B-Bomb, U-Kwon)	Blooming Period	"빙글빙글 (Round and Round)"	Yes	Yes	—N/a	
2016	Dok2 (featuring Dean)	Non-album single	"Bad Vibes Lonely"	Yes	Yes	—N/a	
2016	Heize (featuring Dean)	And July	"Shut Up & Groove"	Yes	Yes	Arrangement	
2016	Heize (featuring Dean, DJ Fritz)	And July	"And July"	Yes	Yes	—N/a	
2016	Miryo (featuring Dean)	Unpretty Rapstar 3 track 5	"Ain't Got Nobody"	No	Yes	Production	
2016	Yuk Jidam (featuring Suran and Dean)	Unpretty Rapstar 3 track 6	"No Thx"	No	Yes	Production	
2016	Bastarz	Welcome 2 Bastarz	"Make It Rain"	Yes	Yes	Arrangement	
