= List of awards and nominations received by Dean (South Korean singer) =

Dean awards and nominations
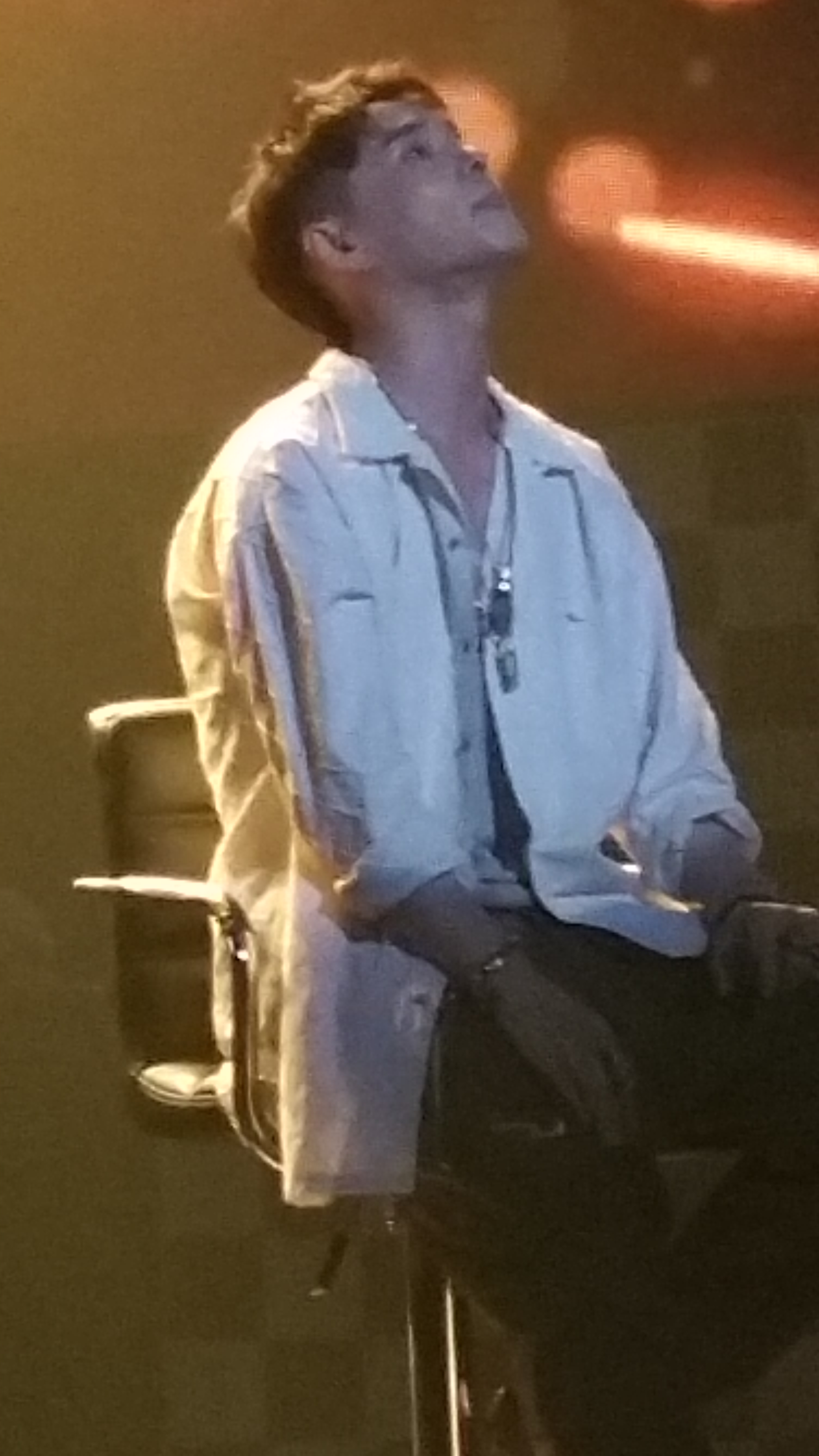
- DEAN in Seoul, 2017.
Awards and nominations
| Award | Wins | Nominations |
| Gaon Chart Music Awards | 1 | 4 |
| Korean Hip-Hop Awards | 5 | 9 |
| Korean Music Awards | 1 | 3 |
| MBC Plus X Genie Music Awards | 0 | 3 |
| Melon Music Awards | 0 | 2 |
| Mnet Asian Music Awards | 1 | 9 |
| Seoul Music Awards | 0 | 3 |

Totals (Note: Certain award groups do not simply award one winner. They acknowledge several different recipients, have runners-up, and have third place. Since this is a specific recognition and is different from losing an award, runner-up mentions are considered wins in this award tally. For simplification and to avoid errors, each award in this list has been presumed to have had a prior nomination.)
- Wins: 8
- Nominations: 33

This is a list of awards and nominations received by Dean, a South Korean alternative R&B singer-songwriter and record producer. In 2016, he released his first EP, 130 mood : TRBL which received nominations on Korean Music Awards and Korean Hip-Hop Awards for Best R&B & Soul Album and Album of the Year, with three singles from the album receiving multiple nominations; "Pour Up" won Best R&B and Soul Song on Korean Music Awards, "21" received nomination for the same category, his best-selling single "D (Half Moon)" earned a nomination for Song of the Year on MAMA awards, and Best R&B/Soul Song on MelOn Music Awards, and won Korean Hip-Hop Awards for R&B Track of the Year.

Dean also collaborates with many artists, which has earned him two wins on South Korean music programs.

== Awards and nominations ==
Name of the award ceremony, year presented, category, nominee of the award, and result of the nomination
| Award ceremony | Year | Category | Nominee / work | Result | Ref. |
|---|---|---|---|---|---|
| Gaon Chart Music Awards | 2016 | Song of the Year – June | "Starlight" (Taeyeon featuring Dean) | Nominated | |
| Gaon Chart Music Awards | 2016 | Song of the Year – July | "And July" (Heize featuring Dean & DJ Friz) | Nominated | |
| Gaon Chart Music Awards | 2016 | Discovery of the Year – R&B | Dean | Won | |
| Gaon Chart Music Awards | 2018 | Song of the Year – December | "Instagram" | Nominated | |
| Korean Hip-Hop Awards | 2017 | Artist of the Year | Dean | Nominated | |
| Korean Hip-Hop Awards | 2017 | Album of the Year | 130 mood: TRBL | Nominated | |
| Korean Hip-Hop Awards | 2017 | R&B Track of the Year | "D (Half Moon)" | Won | |
| Korean Hip-Hop Awards | 2017 | Collaboration of the Year | "Bermuda Triangle" (Zico featuring Dean & Crush) | Nominated | |
| Korean Hip-Hop Awards | 2017 | Collaboration of the Year | "And July" (Heize featuring Dean & DJ Fritz) | Nominated | |
| Korean Hip-Hop Awards | 2018 | R&B Track of the Year | "Gold" (offonoff featuring Dean) | Won | |
| Korean Hip-Hop Awards | 2019 | R&B Track of the Year | "Instagram" | Won | |
| Korean Hip-Hop Awards | 2020 | R&B Track of the Year | "Howlin' 404" | Won | |
| Korean Hip-Hop Awards | 2024 | R&B Track of the Year | "Die 4 You" | Won | |
| Korean Music Awards | 2016 | Best R&B and Soul Song | "Pour Up" | Won | |
| Korean Music Awards | 2017 | Best R&B and Soul Album | 130 mood: TRBL | Nominated | |
| Korean Music Awards | 2017 | Best R&B and Soul Song | "21" | Nominated | |
| MBC Plus X Genie Music Awards | 2018 | Artist of the Year | Dean | Nominated | |
| MBC Plus X Genie Music Awards | 2018 | Male Artist Award | Dean | Nominated | |
| MBC Plus X Genie Music Awards | 2018 | Genie Music Popularity Award | Dean | Nominated | |
| Melon Music Awards | 2016 | Best R&B/Soul Song | "D (Half Moon)" | Nominated | |
| Melon Music Awards | 2017 | Best Rap/Hip Hop Award | "Bermuda Triangle" (Zico featuring Dean & Crush) | Nominated | |
| Mnet Asian Music Awards | 2016 | Best Vocal Performance Male Solo | Dean | Nominated | |
| Mnet Asian Music Awards | 2016 | Song of the Year | "D (Half Moon)" | Nominated | |
| Mnet Asian Music Awards | 2017 | Song of the Year | "Come Over" | Nominated | |
| Mnet Asian Music Awards | 2017 | Best Rap Performance | "Come Over" | Nominated | |
| Mnet Asian Music Awards | 2018 | Artist of the Year | Dean | Nominated | |
| Mnet Asian Music Awards | 2018 | Song of the Year | "Instagram" | Nominated | |
| Mnet Asian Music Awards | 2018 | Best Male Artist | Dean | Nominated | |
| Mnet Asian Music Awards | 2018 | Best Rap Performance | "Instagram" | Nominated | |
| Mnet Asian Music Awards | 2018 | Best Composer of the Year | Deanfluenza (DEAN) | Won | |
| Seoul Music Awards | 2018 | Bonsang Award | Dean | Nominated | |
| Seoul Music Awards | 2018 | Popularity Award | Dean | Nominated | |
| Seoul Music Awards | 2018 | Hallyu Special Award | Dean | Nominated | |
