= Galdive =

Indonesian R&B duo

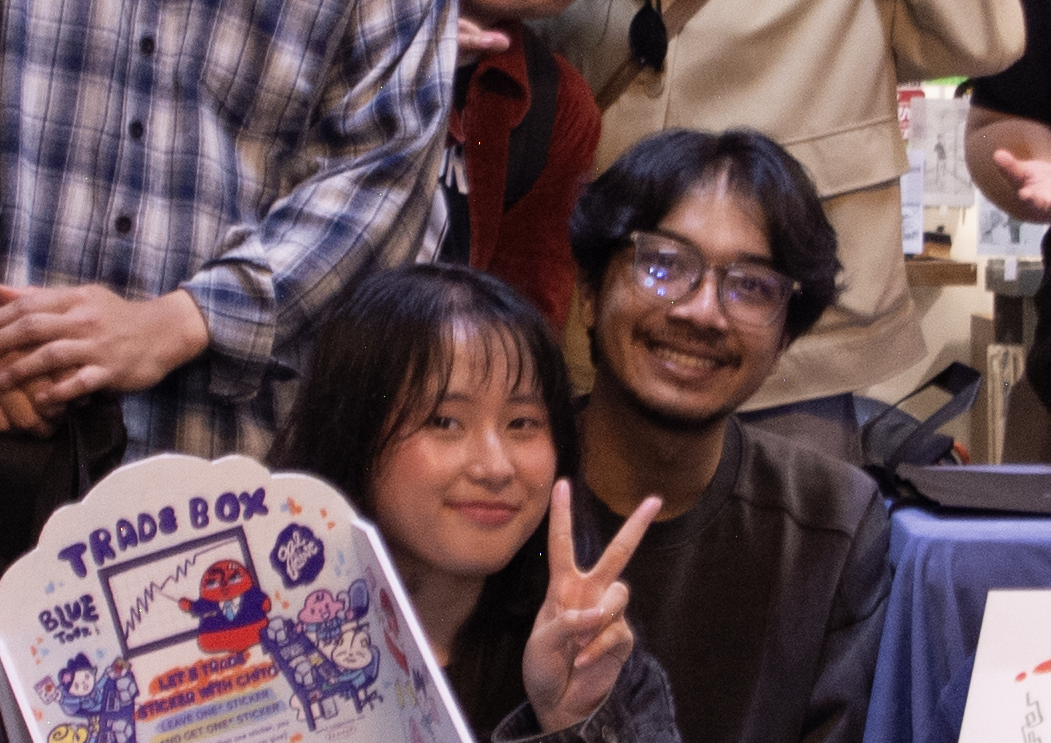
- Tisha and Osvaldorio in a middle of a group photo with fans at a fan meetup held at Pasar Santa, South Jakarta, 19th December 2025.

Background information
- Origin: South Tanggerang, Indonesia
- Genres: Electropop; contemporary R&B
- Years active: 2018–present
- Labels: Mom + Pop; Avoca Drive
- Members: Osvaldorio; Tanisha T. Sadewo

Galdive is an Indonesian R&B duo. The group consists of producer Osvaldo Rio "Osvaldorio" Nugroho A. and singer Tanisha Tishawiana "Tisha" Sadewo. They released their debut studio album, Canvas, on 19 November 2021.

== Career ==
In 2015, Osvaldorio released a single, "Save Me", with future band member, Tanisha T. Sadewo, under the stage name Wiana. Based on an Instagram Story QnA session answered in 12th of August 2020 in their instagram account, @galdivemuse, it was mentioned that they met in 2014 and bonded over their mutual love for music produced by Galimatias, of which became their main musical inspiration. They formed as a duo and named it "Galdive", which stands for "Galimatias Maldives". Their debut single under the stage name Galdive, "Lotus", was produced in 2015, and released in December 2018. The song was subsequently featured by music platforms and publications including Nourish, College Music, and Aviencloud. In 2020, they were the first artist to sign with Australian record label, Avoca Drive, a joint venture with Sony Music Australia. In November 2021, they released their debut studio album, Canvas.

In 2023, they received an Anugerah Musik Indonesia nomination for Best Contemporary R&B Duo/Group/Collaboration for their single "A Friend". The duo co-wrote and produced South Korean singer Dean's first single in four years, "Die 4 You". They won their first Anugerah Musik Indonesia for Best Contemporary R&B Duo/Group/Collaboration for "Stay" at the 27th ceremony. In November 2024, they signed a recording contract with Mom + Pop Music and released a single "Night Charade". They released their sophomore studio album, Blue, on 9 May 2025.

== Discography ==
=== Studio albums ===
Title	Details
Canvas	Released: 19 November 2021; Label: Avoca Drive
Blue	Released: 9 May 2025; Label: Mom + Pop Music

=== Singles ===
Title	Year	Album
"Lotus"	2018	Non-album singles
"Sway"	2019	Non-album singles
"Sorbet"	2019	Non-album singles
"Dear Matias"	2019	Non-album singles
"Cloud"	2019	Non-album singles
"5AM"	2020	Non-album singles
"Nescience"	2020	Canvas
"Maybe I"	2020	Canvas
"Fond Adieu"	2020	Canvas
"Puzzle"	2021	Canvas
"Crazy Driving"	2021	Canvas
"A Friend"	2022	Non-album singles
"Window/Dormer"	2023	Non-album singles
"Stay"	2023	Non-album singles
"Cinema"	2023	Blue
"Bloom"	2024	Blue
"Night Charade"	2024	Blue
"Stay" (featuring RINI)	2025	Non-album single
"Teach Me How to Love"	2025	Blue
"A Seat for You" (featuring Quinn Oulton)	2025	Blue

=== Production discography ===
Title	Year	Artist(s)	Album
"Die 4 You"	2023	Dean	Non-album single

== Awards and nominations ==
Award	Year	Category	Nominee(s)	Result	Ref.
Anugerah Musik Indonesia	2023	Best Contemporary R&B Duo/Group/Collaboration	"A Friend"	Nominated	
Anugerah Musik Indonesia	2024	Best Contemporary R&B Duo/Group/Collaboration	"Stay"	Won	
