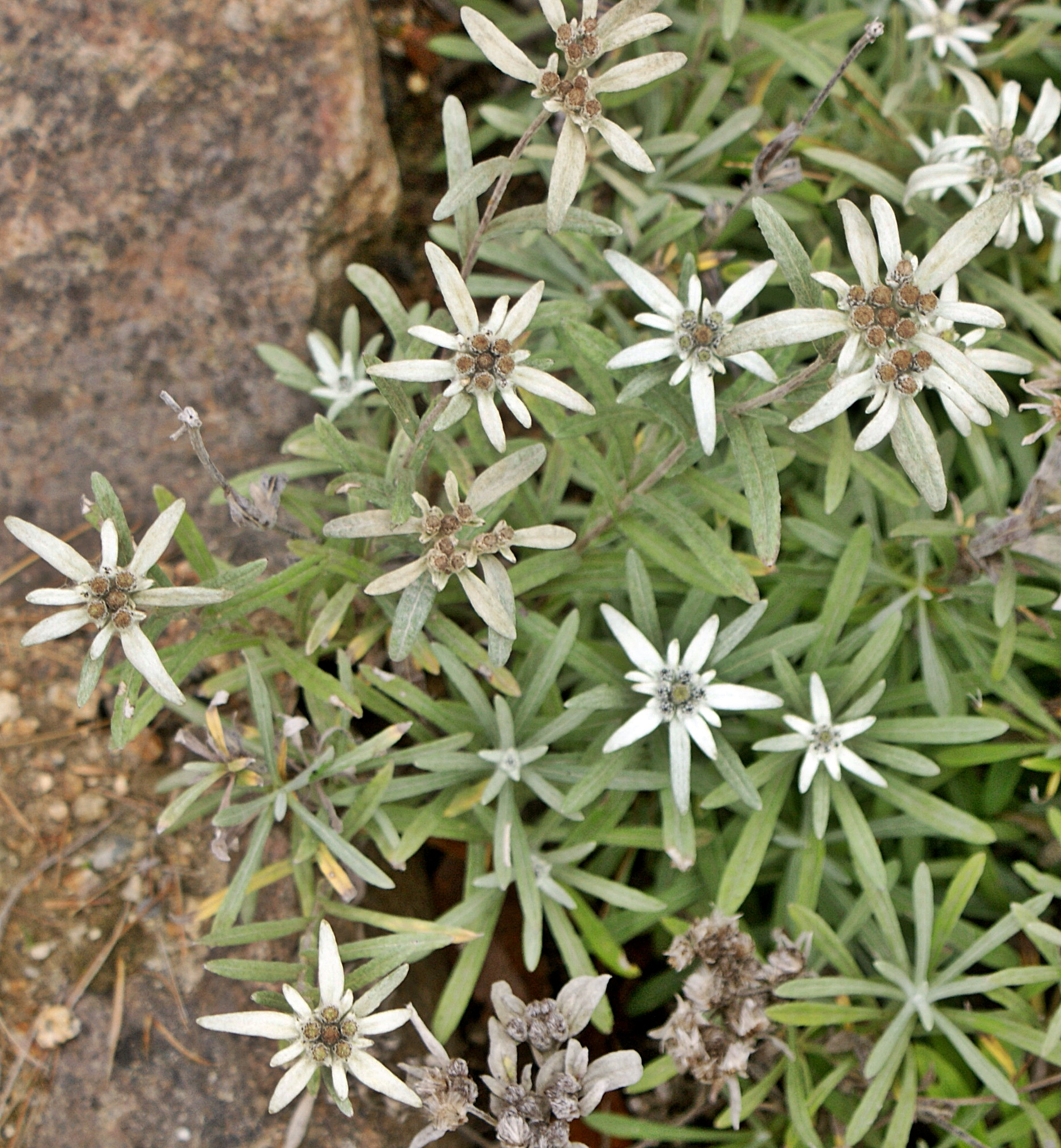

Scientific classification
- Kingdom: Plantae
- Clade: Tracheophytes
- Clade: Angiosperms
- Clade: Eudicots
- Clade: Asterids
- Order: Asterales
- Family: Asteraceae
- Genus: Leontopodium
- Species: L. sinense

Binomial name
- Leontopodium sinense Hemsl.

Synonyms
- Gnaphalium nobile Bureau & Franch.; Gnaphalium sinense Franch.; Leontopodium arbuscula Beauverd; Leontopodium niveum Hand.-Mazz.; Leontopodium nobile Beauverd; Leontopodium rosmarinoides Hand.-Mazz.; Leontopodium stoechas Hand.-Mazz.

= Leontopodium sinense =

Species of flowering plant

Leontopodium sinense is a species of plant in the family Asteraceae. It is native to China.
