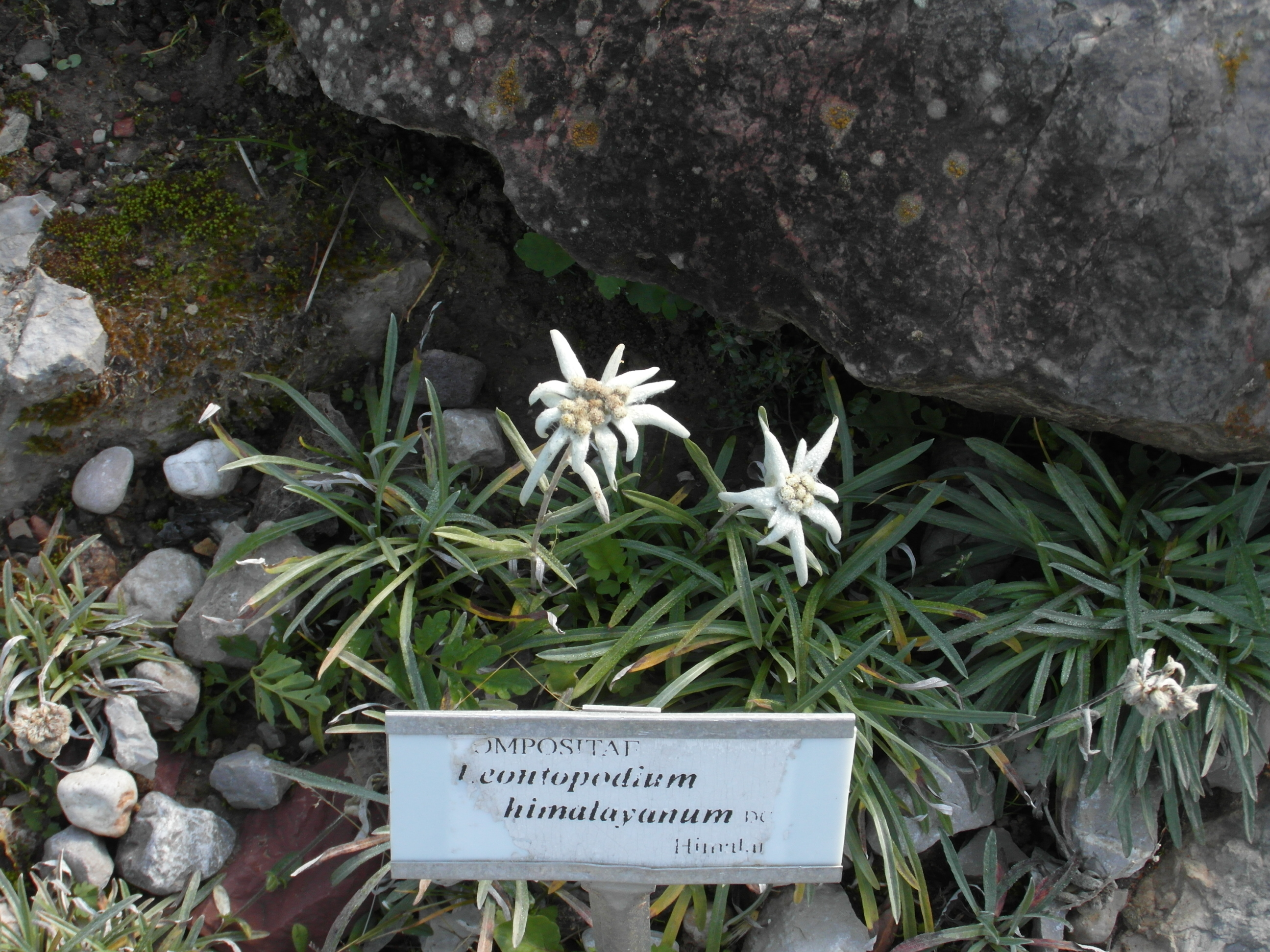

Scientific classification
- Kingdom: Plantae
- Clade: Tracheophytes
- Clade: Angiosperms
- Clade: Eudicots
- Clade: Asterids
- Order: Asterales
- Family: Asteraceae
- Genus: Leontopodium
- Species: L. himalayanum

Binomial name
- Leontopodium himalayanum DC.

= Leontopodium himalayanum =

Species of flowering plant

Leontopodium himalayanum is a species of plant in the family Asteraceae. It is native to China, Bhutan, India, Myanmar, Nepal and Pakistan.

Common name: Himalayan Edelweiss, Tra - Wa(Dzongkha)

Brief Description: Leaves liner – spathulate sometimes brown apiculate, acute or sub obtuse. Flower corolla densely white, yellowish – grey or tawny.

Flowering time: June – October

Elevation ranges: 3800 – 5500 masl

Part used: Leaves.

Uses:

o Use as ingredients for moxibustion.
