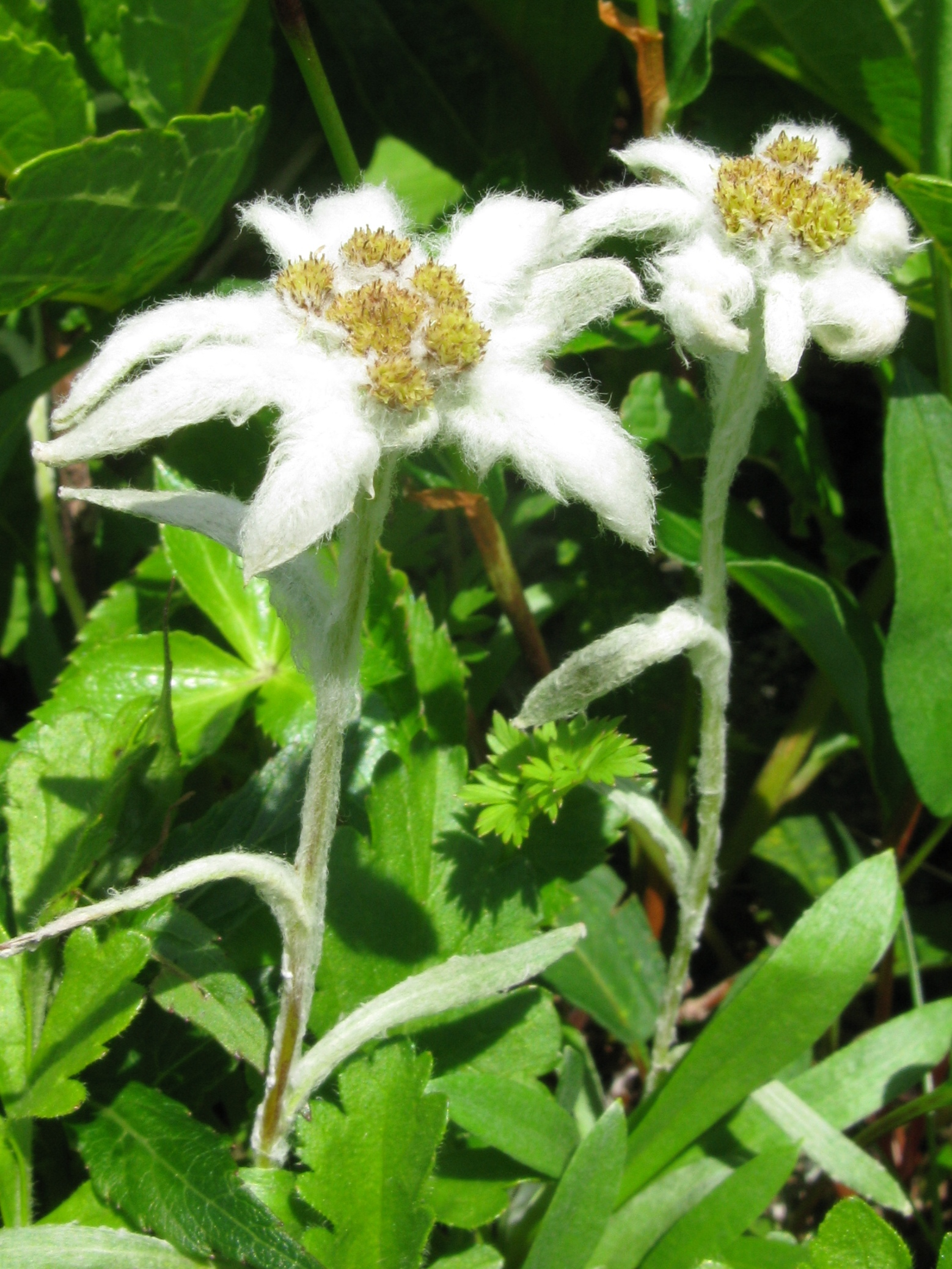
- Close-up of flowers

Scientific classification
- Kingdom: Plantae
- Clade: Tracheophytes
- Clade: Angiosperms
- Clade: Eudicots
- Clade: Asterids
- Order: Asterales
- Family: Asteraceae
- Genus: Leontopodium
- Species: L. fauriei

Binomial name
- Leontopodium fauriei Hand.-Mazz.

= Leontopodium fauriei =

Species of flowering plant

Leontopodium fauriei is a species of plant in the family Asteraceae. It is native to Japan and considered as a rare species by the IUCN since 1998.
