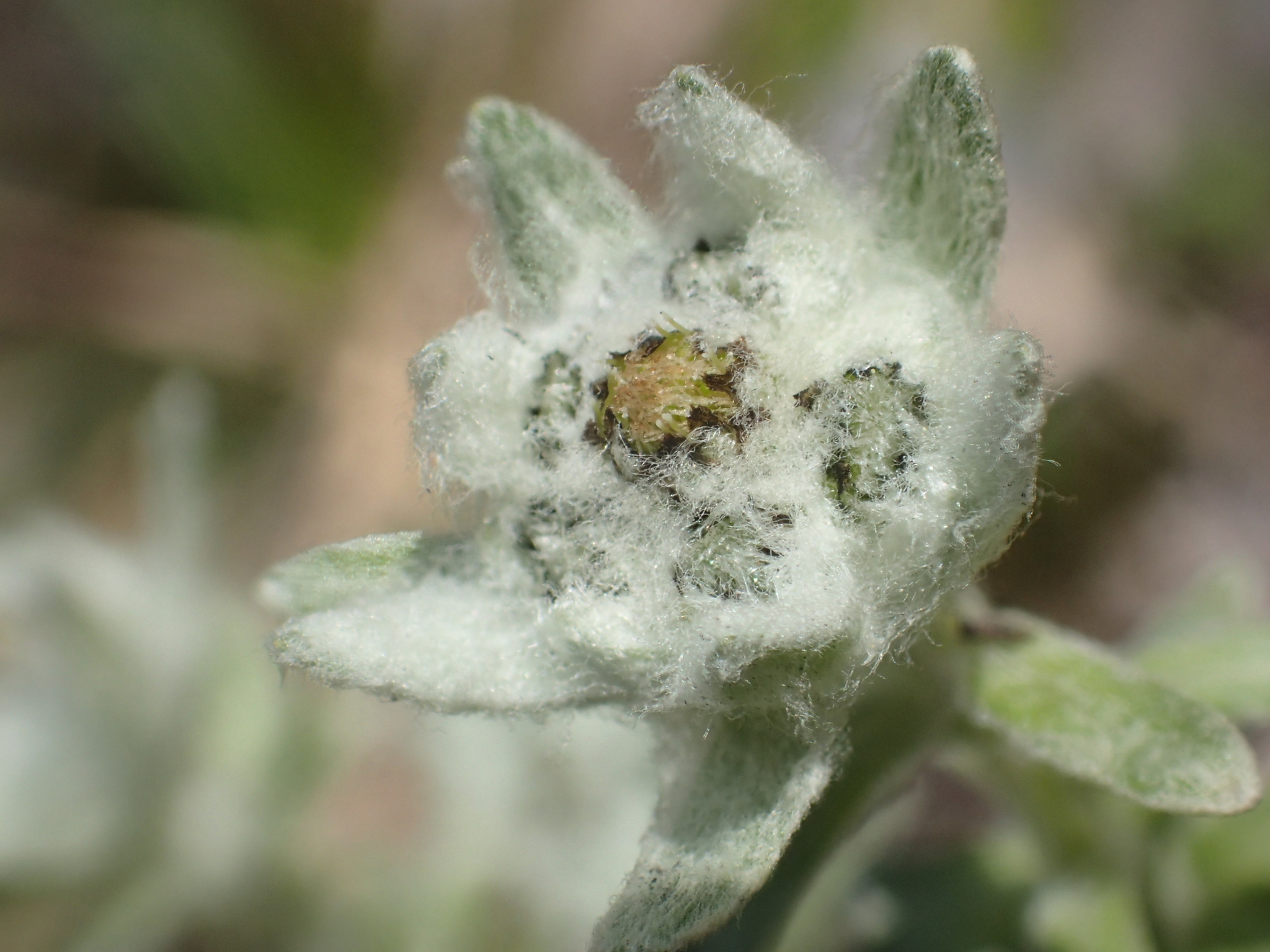

Scientific classification
- Kingdom: Plantae
- Clade: Tracheophytes
- Clade: Angiosperms
- Clade: Eudicots
- Clade: Asterids
- Order: Asterales
- Family: Asteraceae
- Genus: Leontopodium
- Species: L. microphyllum

Binomial name
- Leontopodium microphyllum Hayata

= Leontopodium microphyllum =

Species of flowering plant

Leontopodium microphyllum, known as Taiwan edelweiss, or small leaf edelweiss, is a species of plant in the family Asteraceae. It is endemic to the mountains of Taiwan.

The plant is a relative of the European Edelweiss (Leontopodium alpinum). It was first published by Japanese botanist Bunzō Hayata in 1908.

== Description ==
Leontopodium microphyllum is a low herb grows in alpine mountain habitats, at altitudes of 3,200–3,950 metres (10,500–12,960 ft).
