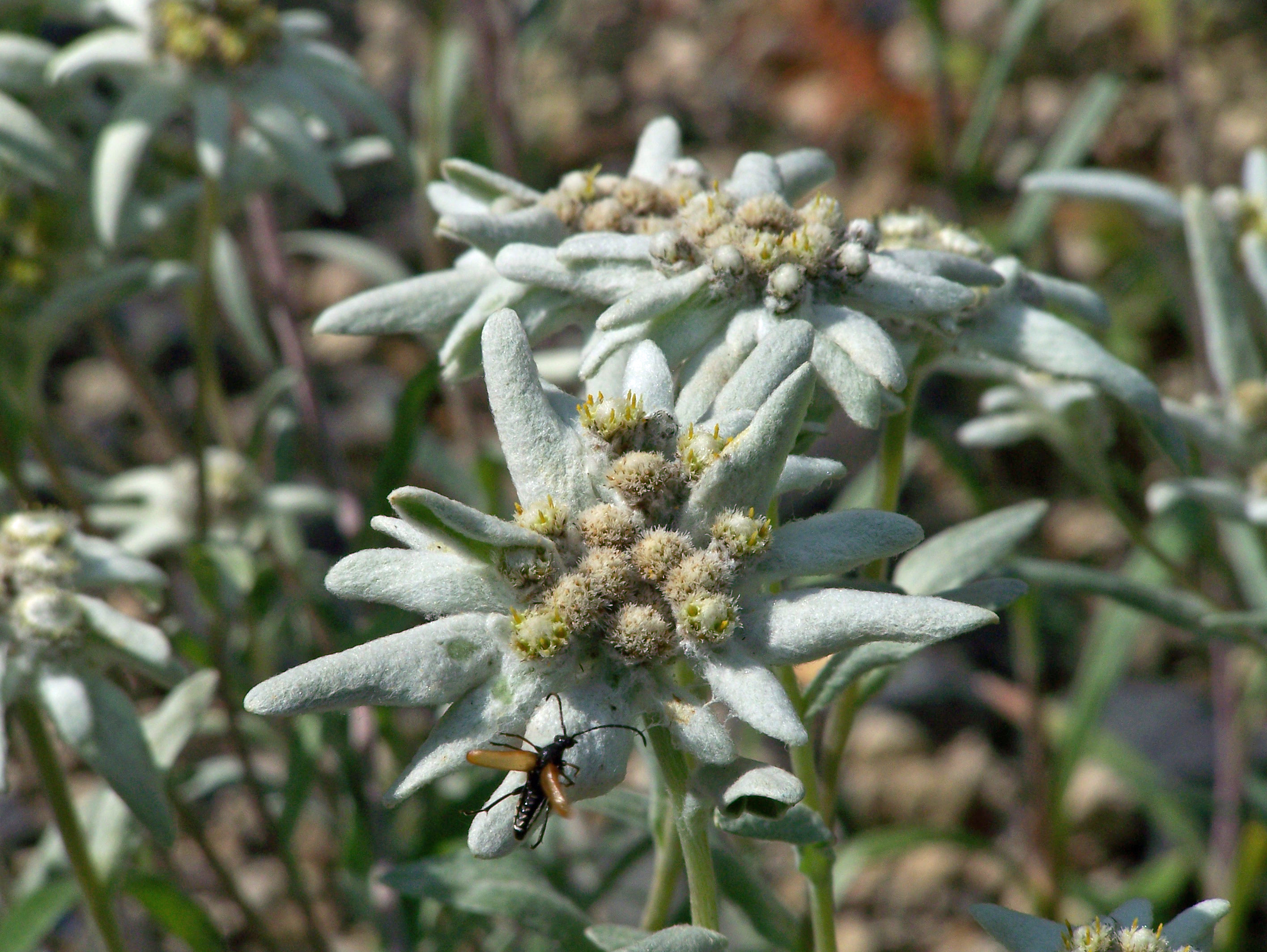

Scientific classification
- Kingdom: Plantae
- Clade: Tracheophytes
- Clade: Angiosperms
- Clade: Eudicots
- Clade: Asterids
- Order: Asterales
- Family: Asteraceae
- Genus: Leontopodium
- Species: L. palibinianum

Binomial name
- Leontopodium palibinianum Beauverd

= Leontopodium palibinianum =

Species of flowering plant

Leontopodium palibinianum is a species of plant in the family Asteraceae. It is native to the Sikhote-Alin mountains, located in Russia.
