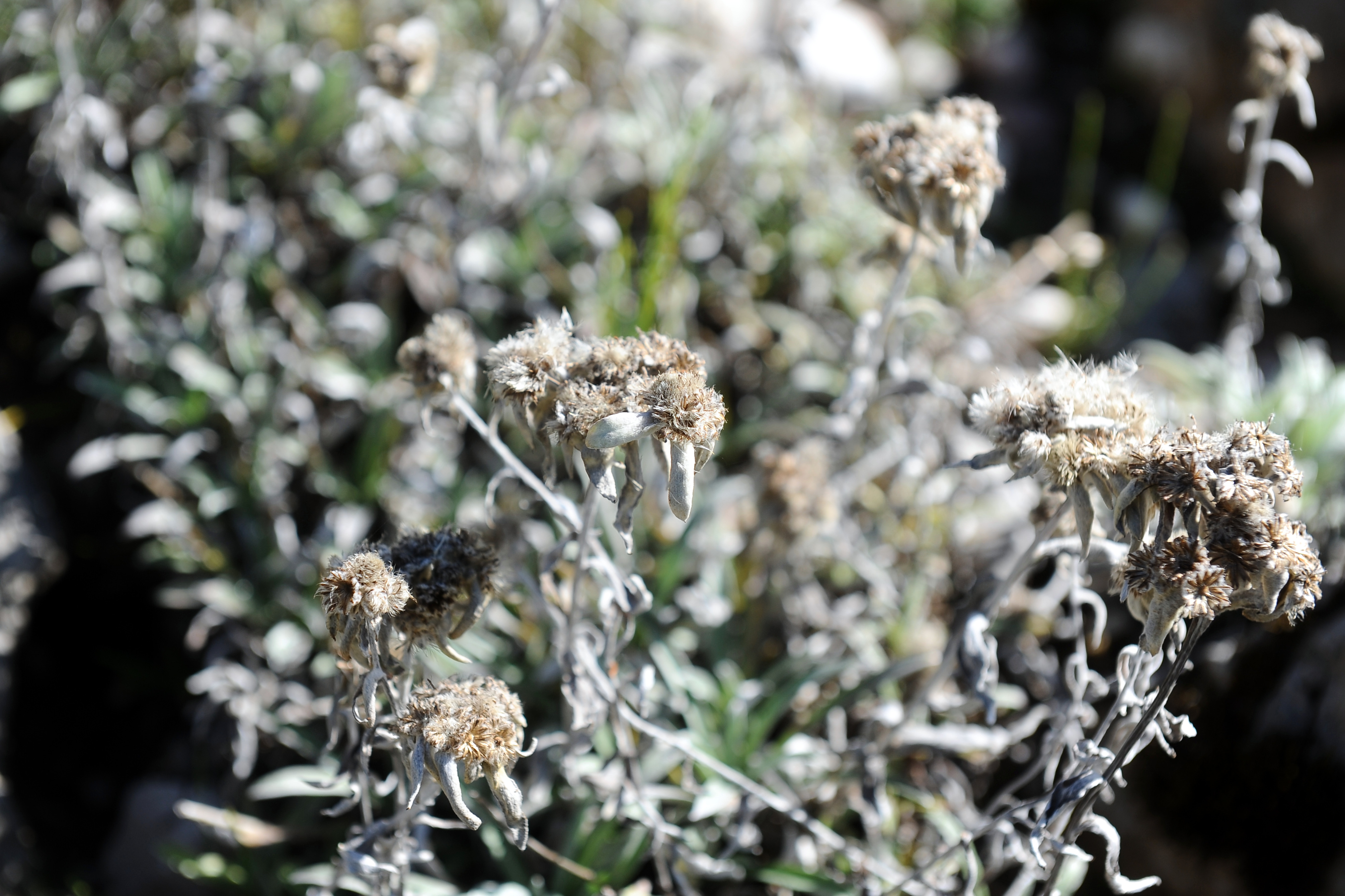

Scientific classification
- Kingdom: Plantae
- Clade: Tracheophytes
- Clade: Angiosperms
- Clade: Eudicots
- Clade: Asterids
- Order: Asterales
- Family: Asteraceae
- Genus: Leontopodium
- Species: L. leontopodinum

Binomial name
- Leontopodium leontopodinum Hand.-Mazz.

= Leontopodium leontopodinum =

Species of flowering plant

Leontopodium leontopodinum is a species of plant in the family Asteraceae. It is native to Bhutan, Nepal, India, Pakistan, Afghanistan and Central Asia.
