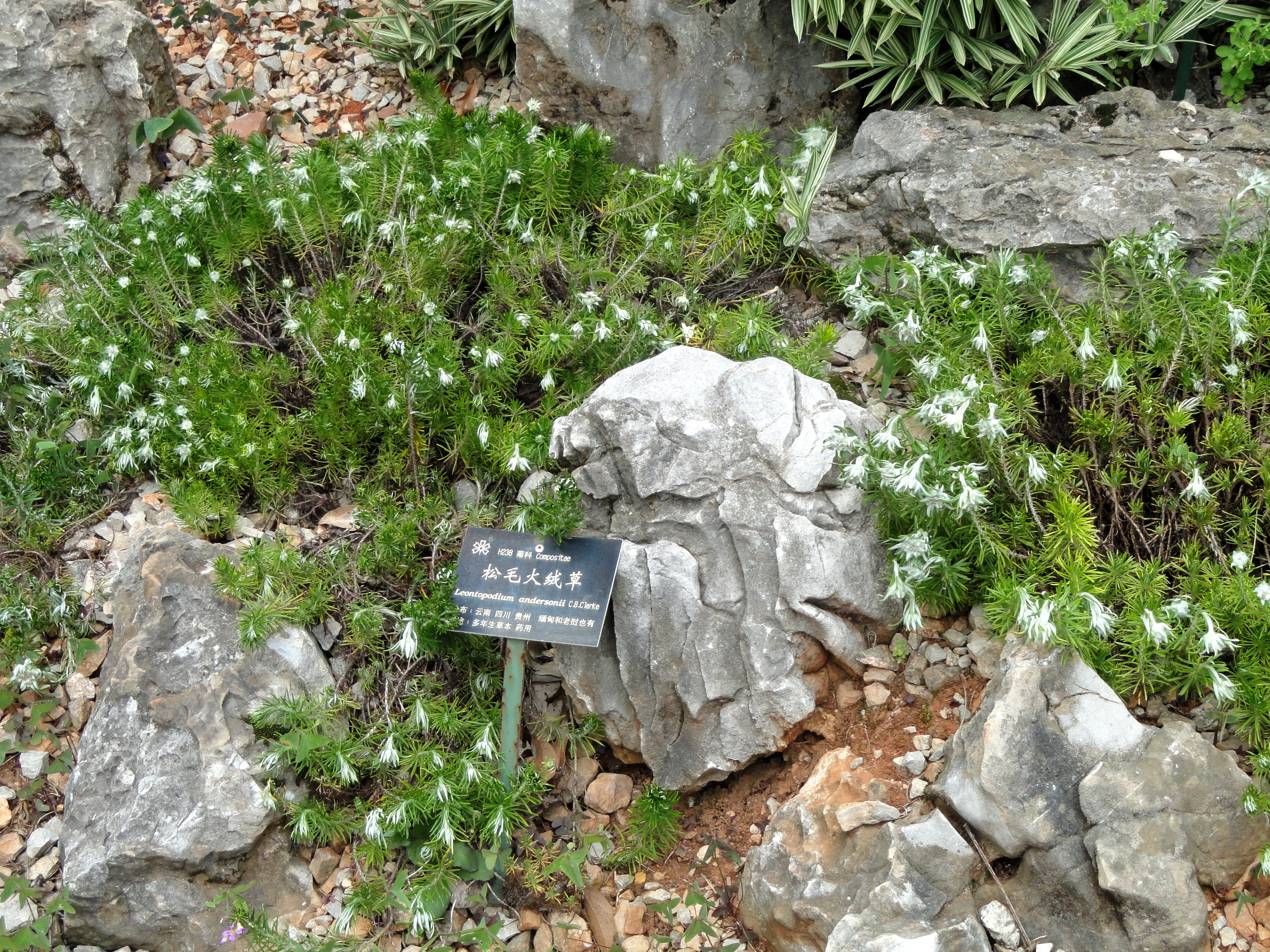

Scientific classification
- Kingdom: Plantae
- Clade: Tracheophytes
- Clade: Angiosperms
- Clade: Eudicots
- Clade: Asterids
- Order: Asterales
- Family: Asteraceae
- Genus: Leontopodium
- Species: L. andersonii

Binomial name
- Leontopodium andersonii C.B. Clarke

= Leontopodium andersonii =

Species of flowering plant

Leontopodium andersonii is a species of plant in the family Asteraceae. It is native to China, Laos and Myanmar.
