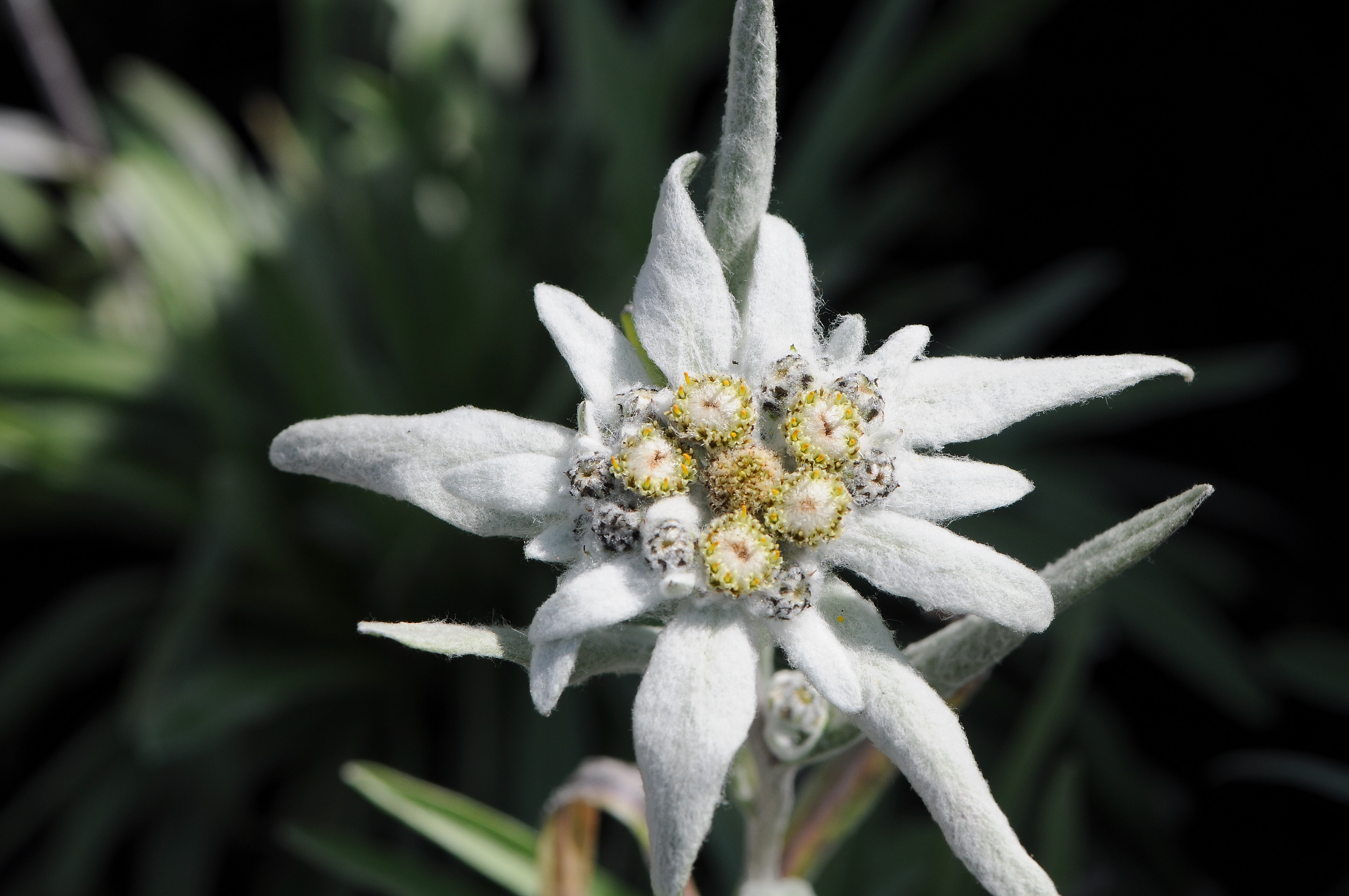
- Edelweiss (Leontopodium nivale)

Scientific classification
- Kingdom: Plantae
- Clade: Tracheophytes
- Clade: Angiosperms
- Clade: Eudicots
- Clade: Asterids
- Order: Asterales
- Family: Asteraceae
- Subfamily: Asteroideae
- Tribe: Gnaphalieae
- Genus: Leontopodium (Pers.) R.Br. ex Cass.

= Leontopodium =

Genus of flowering plants

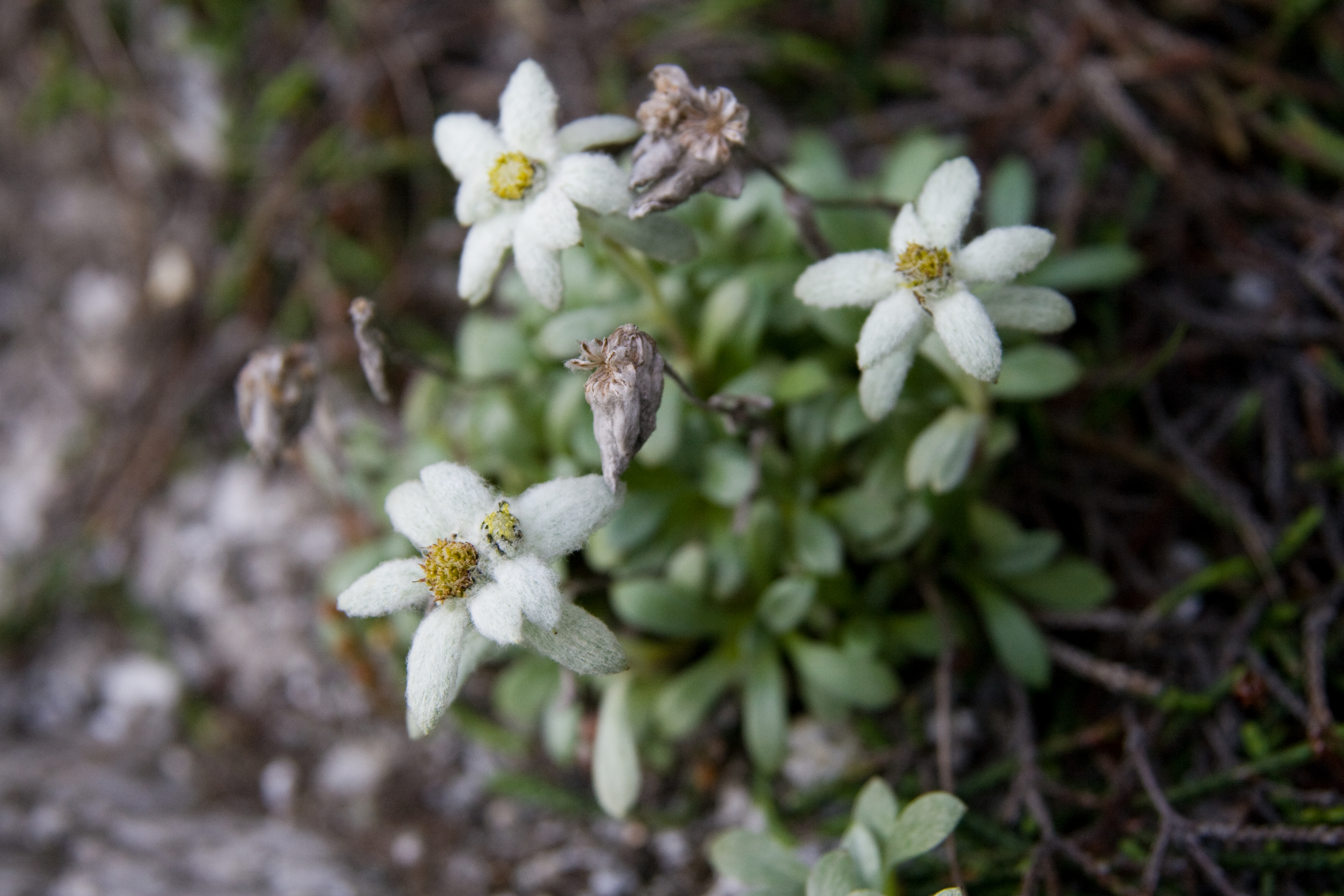
L. shinanense

Leontopodium is a genus of plants in the family Asteraceae. The genus is native to Europe and Asia. The fuzzy and somewhat stocky "petals" (technically, bracts) could be thought of as somewhat resembling lions' paws—hence the genus name combining Greek léōn ('lion') and pódion ('foot').

The genus includes the edelweiss (L. nivale), a well-known plant from the mountains of Europe. The term edelweiss can, more rarely, refer to other members of the genus.

== Taxonomy ==
The following species are currently recognized:

- Leontopodium albogriseum
- Leontopodium andersonii
- Leontopodium antennarioides
- Leontopodium artemisiifolium
- Leontopodium aurantiacum
- Leontopodium beerianum
- Leontopodium blagoveshczenskyi
- Leontopodium brachyactis
- Leontopodium calocephalum
- Leontopodium campestre
- Leontopodium chuii
- Leontopodium conglobatum
- Leontopodium coreanum
- Leontopodium dedekensii
- Leontopodium delavayanum
- Leontopodium discolor
- Leontopodium fangingense
- Leontopodium fauriei
- Leontopodium forrestianum
- Leontopodium franchetii
- Leontopodium giraldii
- Leontopodium gracile
- Leontopodium haastioides
- Leontopodium haplophylloides
- Leontopodium hayachinense
- Leontopodium himalayanum
- Leontopodium jacotianum
- Leontopodium japonicum
- Leontopodium kamtschaticum
- Leontopodium kurilense
- Leontopodium leiolepis
- Leontopodium leontopodinum
- Leontopodium longifolium
- Leontopodium melanolepis
- Leontopodium meredithae
- Leontopodium micranthum
- Leontopodium microphyllum
- Leontopodium monocephalum
- Leontopodium muscoides
- Leontopodium nanum
- Leontopodium nivale
- Leontopodium niveum
- Leontopodium ochroleucum
- Leontopodium omeiense
- Leontopodium palibinianum
- Leontopodium pusillum
- Leontopodium roseum
- Leontopodium rosmarinoides
- Leontopodium shinanense
- Leontopodium sinense
- Leontopodium smithianum
- Leontopodium souliei
- Leontopodium stellatum
- Leontopodium stoechas
- Leontopodium stoloniferum
- Leontopodium stracheyi
- Leontopodium subulatum
- Leontopodium villosulum
- Leontopodium villosum
- Leontopodium wilsonii

== In popular culture ==
Leontopodium nivale, the edelweiss, has been regarded as a national symbol of Austria, worn as a cap emblem by Austrian troops and displayed on Austrian coins. A song about the plant, written by Oscar Hammerstein, was featured in the musical production The Sound of Music.
