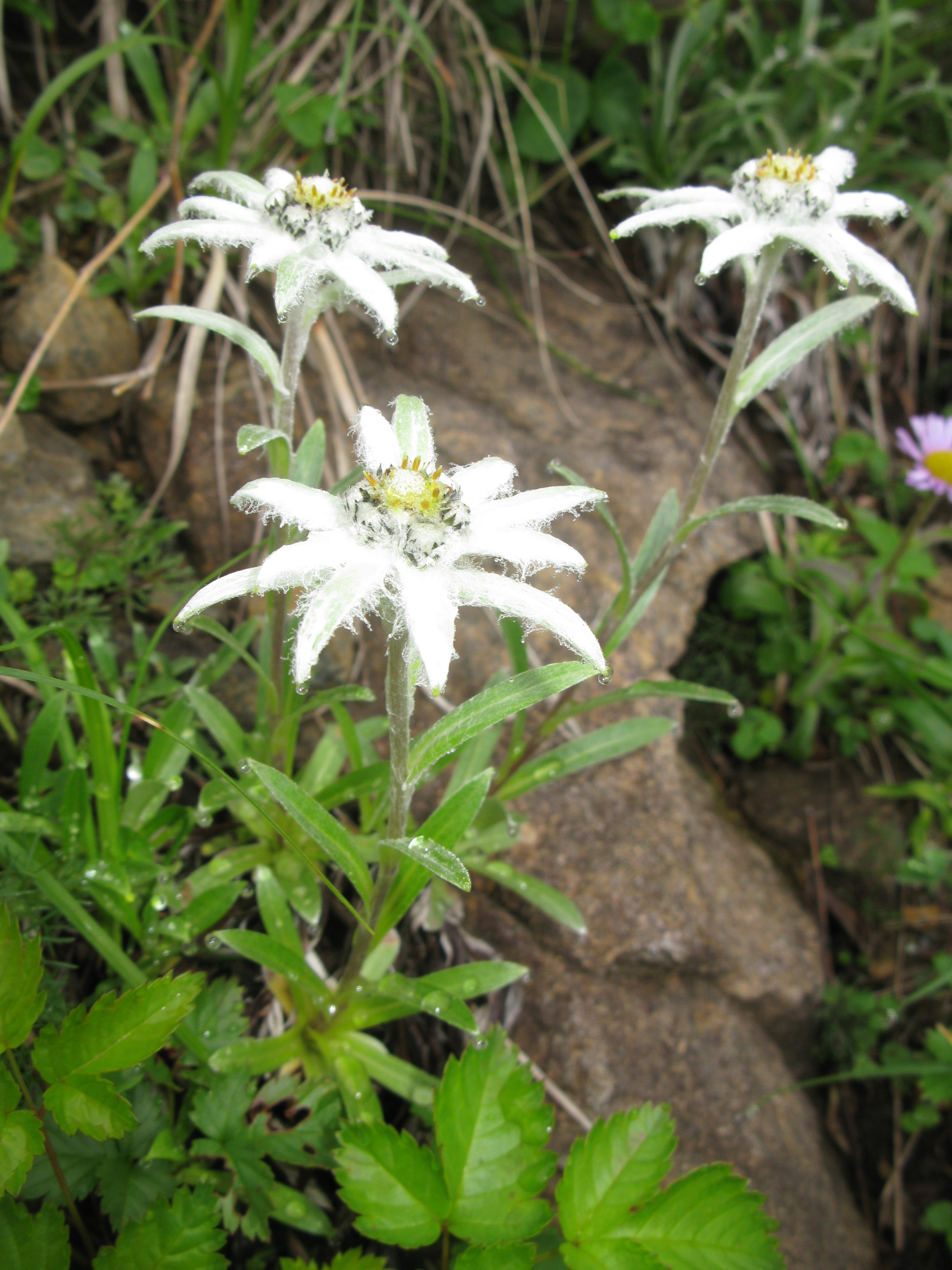

Scientific classification
- Kingdom: Plantae
- Clade: Tracheophytes
- Clade: Angiosperms
- Clade: Eudicots
- Clade: Asterids
- Order: Asterales
- Family: Asteraceae
- Genus: Leontopodium
- Species: L. hayachinense

Binomial name
- Leontopodium hayachinense (Takeda) Hara & Kitam.

= Leontopodium hayachinense =

Species of flowering plant

Leontopodium hayachinense is a species of plant in the family Asteraceae. It is endemic to Japan and considered as a rare species by the IUCN since 1998.
