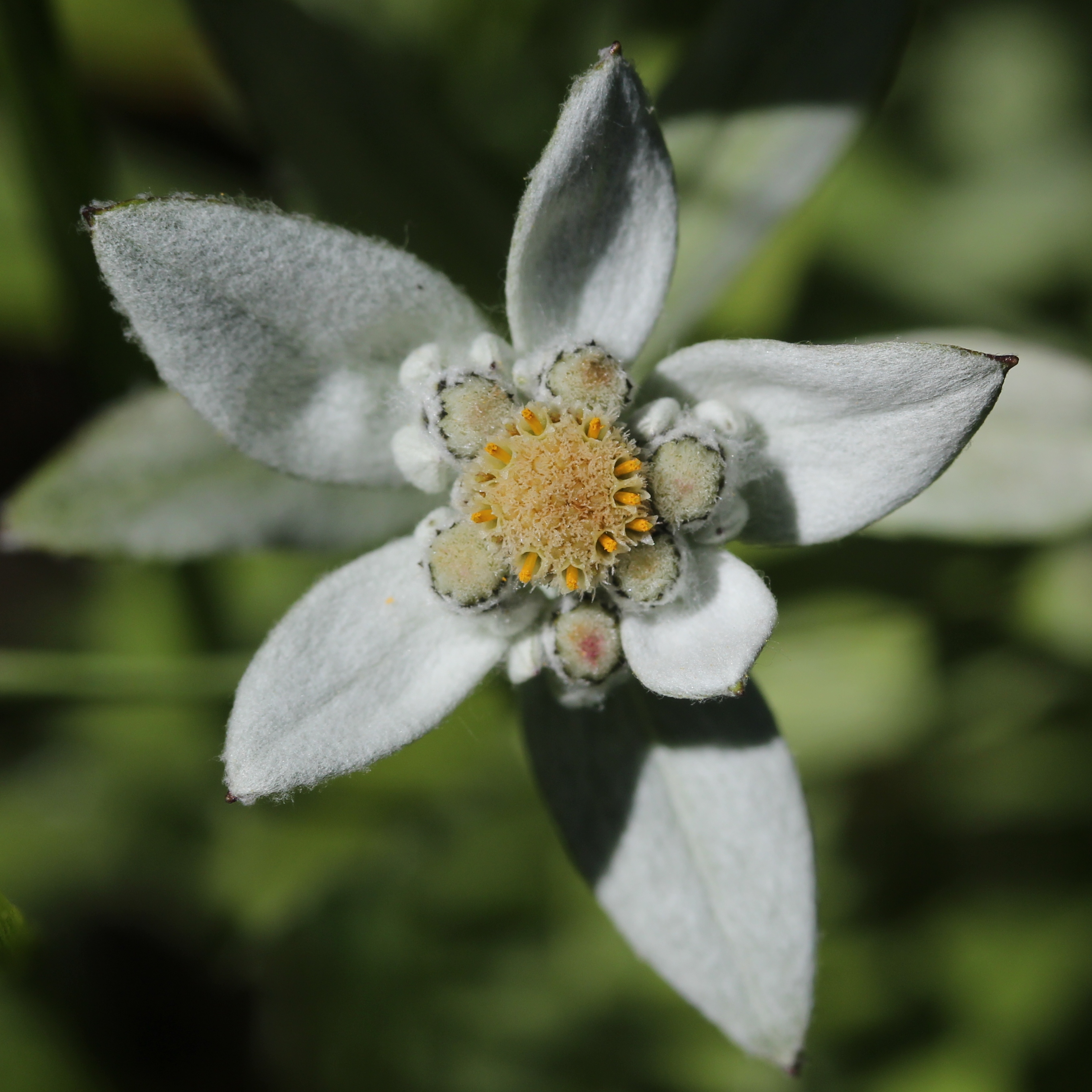
- Close-up of flower

Scientific classification
- Kingdom: Plantae
- Clade: Tracheophytes
- Clade: Angiosperms
- Clade: Eudicots
- Clade: Asterids
- Order: Asterales
- Family: Asteraceae
- Genus: Leontopodium
- Species: L. japonicum

Binomial name
- Leontopodium japonicum (Thunb.) Miq.

= Leontopodium japonicum =

Species of flowering plant

Leontopodium japonicum is a species of plant in the family Asteraceae. It is native to Japan and China.
