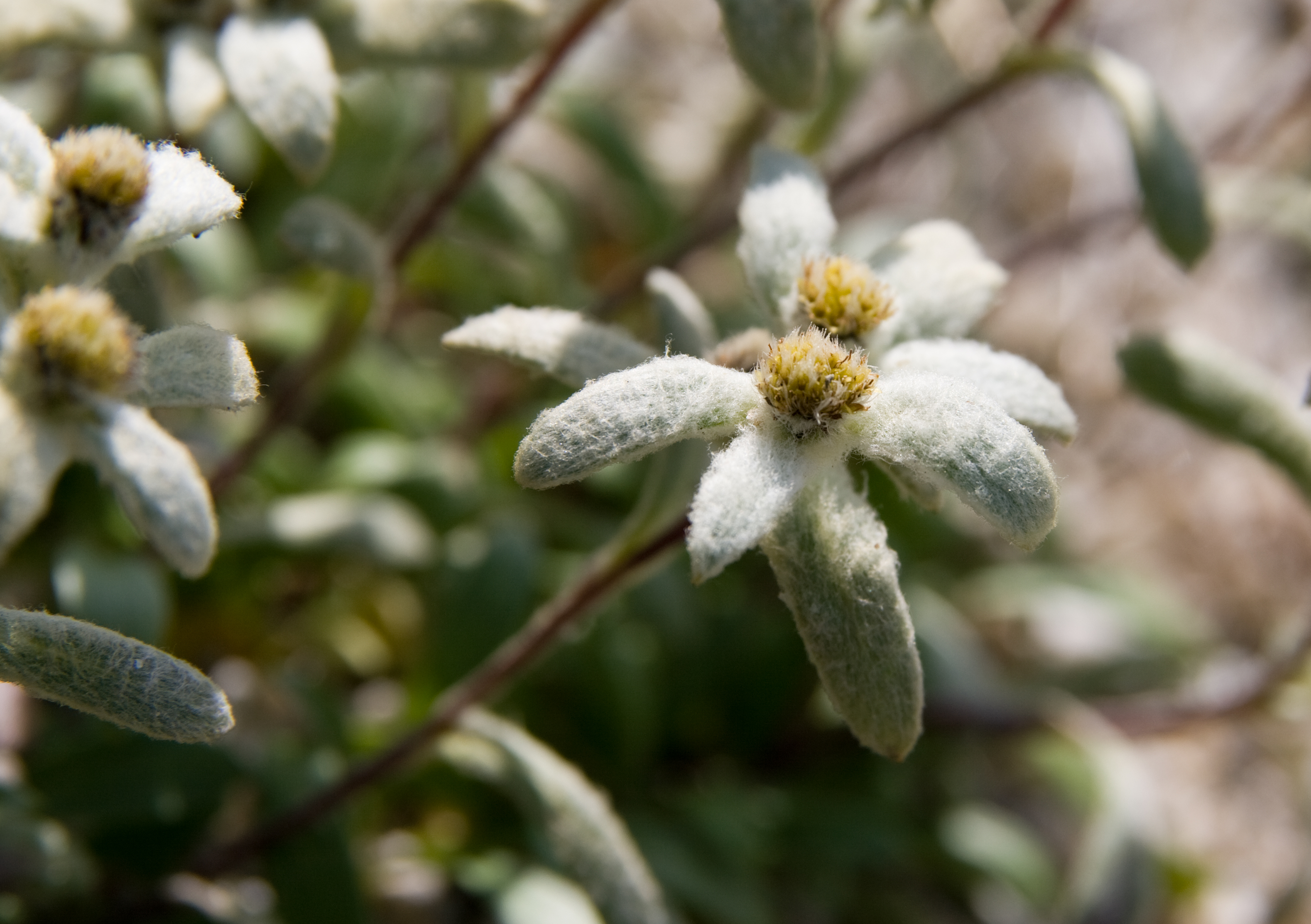
- Close-up of flower

Scientific classification
- Kingdom: Plantae
- Clade: Tracheophytes
- Clade: Angiosperms
- Clade: Eudicots
- Clade: Asterids
- Order: Asterales
- Family: Asteraceae
- Genus: Leontopodium
- Species: L. shinanense

Binomial name
- Leontopodium shinanense Kitam.

= Leontopodium shinanense =

Species of flowering plant

Leontopodium shinanense is a species of plant in the family Asteraceae. It is native to Japan and considered as a rare species by the IUCN since 1998.
