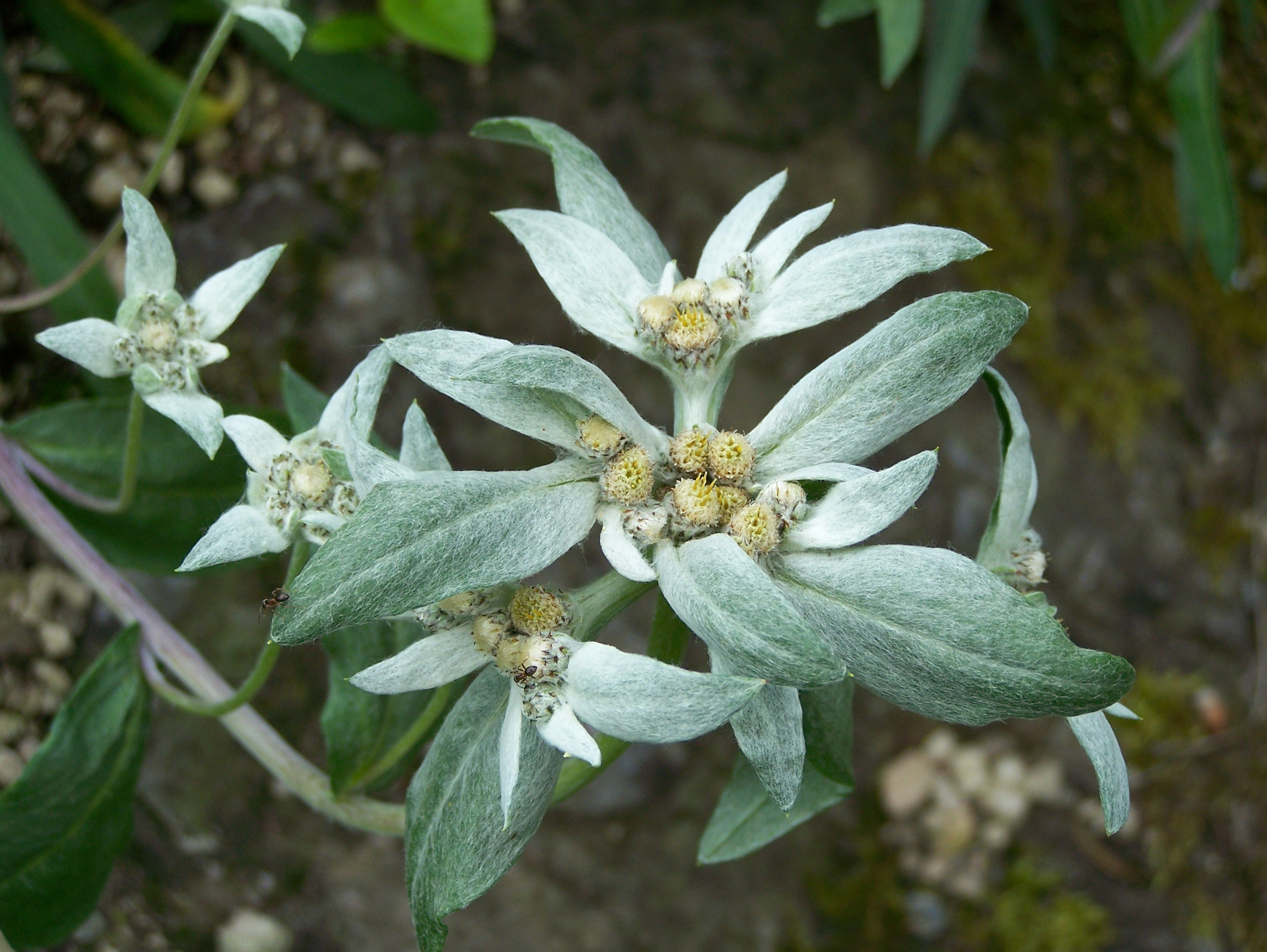
- Close-up of flowers

Scientific classification
- Kingdom: Plantae
- Clade: Tracheophytes
- Clade: Angiosperms
- Clade: Eudicots
- Clade: Asterids
- Order: Asterales
- Family: Asteraceae
- Genus: Leontopodium
- Species: L. jacotianum

Binomial name
- Leontopodium jacotianum Beauverd

= Leontopodium jacotianum =

Species of plant

Leontopodium jacotianum is a species of plant in the family Asteraceae. It is native to Bhutan, China, India, Myanmar and Pakistan.
