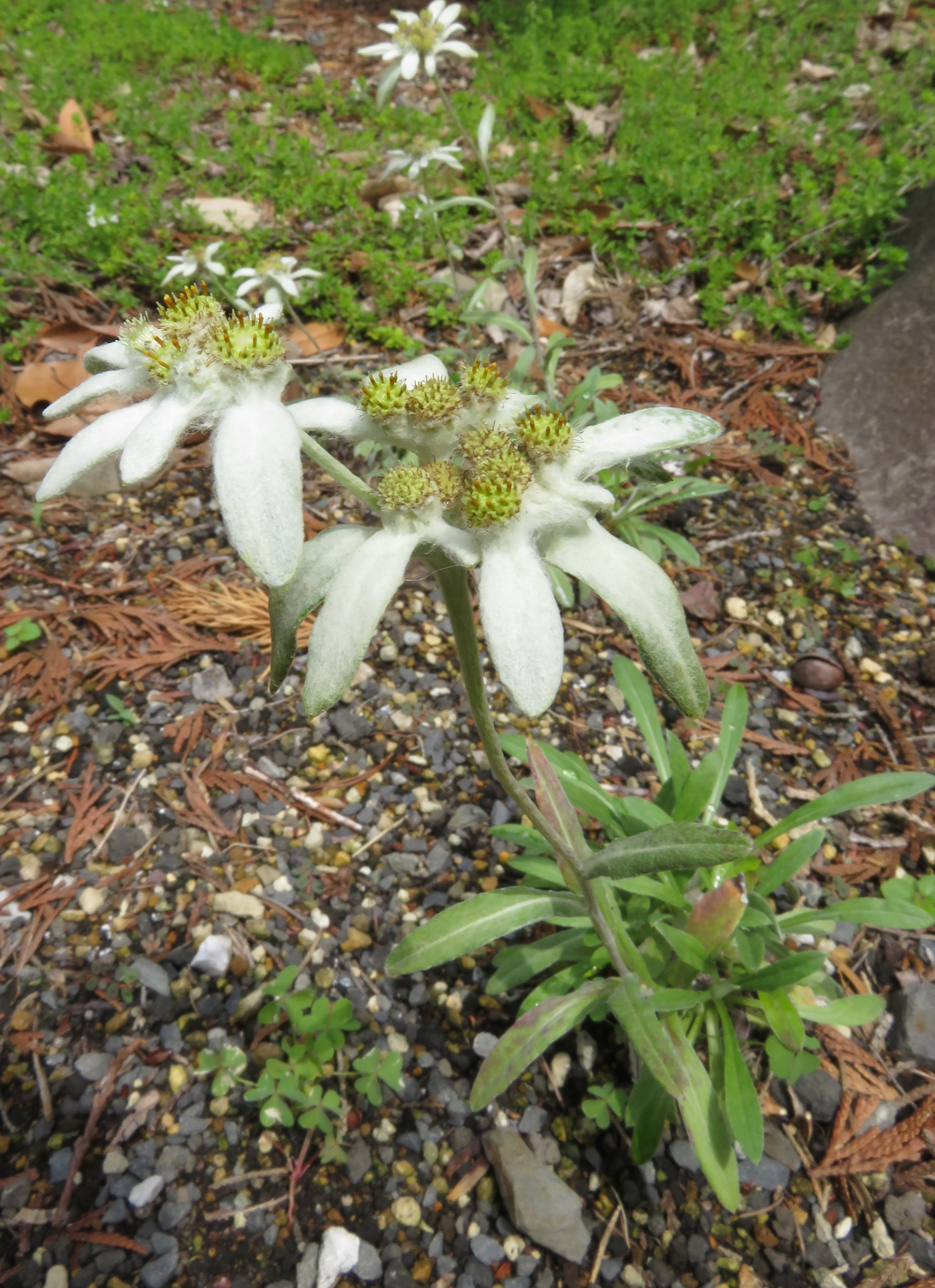

Scientific classification
- Kingdom: Plantae
- Clade: Tracheophytes
- Clade: Angiosperms
- Clade: Eudicots
- Clade: Asterids
- Order: Asterales
- Family: Asteraceae
- Genus: Leontopodium
- Species: L. discolor

Binomial name
- Leontopodium discolor Beauverd.

= Leontopodium discolor =

Species of flowering plant

Leontopodium discolor, known as Ezo-usuyuki-sō or Rebun-usuyuki-sō in Japan, is a species of flowering plant native to alpine areas of Hokkaidō.

== Description ==
Leontopodium discolor is a perennial with white flowers that grows 15–30 cm in height. It is a hermaphrodite.

== Status on Japanese red list ==
The plant is in the endangered category on the red list of threatened plants of Japan.

== Ecology ==
Leontopodium discolor is found in alpine environments in moist stony soils and scree. Insects pollinate its flowers. The flowers bloom from July to September.

== Cultivation ==
Leontopodium discolor requires full sun. The soil must be moist, well-drained, and gritty. The soil can be alkaline or circumneutral as long as it is not too fertile. The plant is hardy to zone 6. In places with wet winters, it is susceptible to root rot and should be protected with a collar of grit and sheltered from the prevailing winds.

== Uses ==
The young leaves can be eaten when cooked. Plants For A Future assigns an edibility rating of 1.
