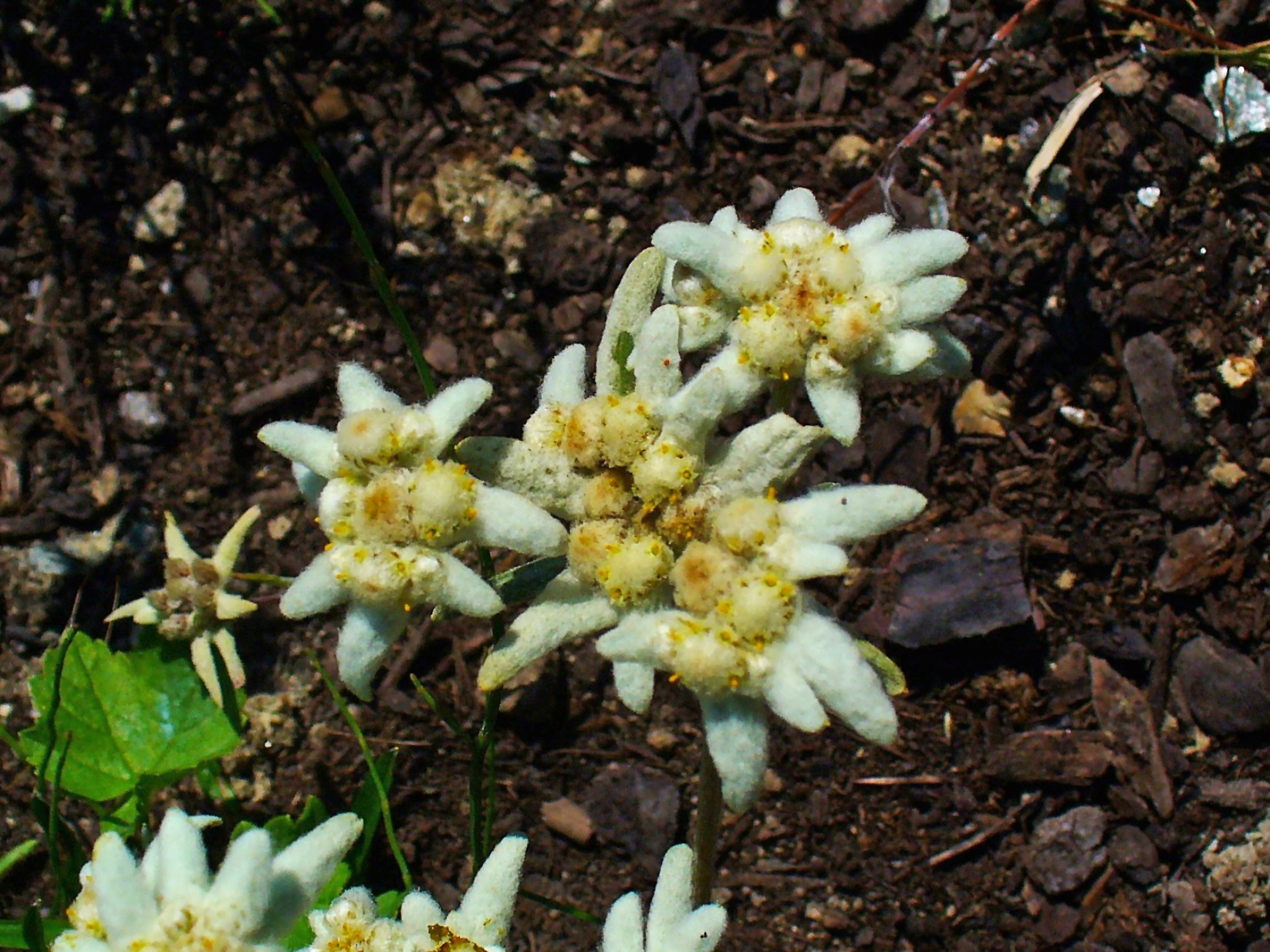
- Close-up of flowers

Scientific classification
- Kingdom: Plantae
- Clade: Tracheophytes
- Clade: Angiosperms
- Clade: Eudicots
- Clade: Asterids
- Order: Asterales
- Family: Asteraceae
- Genus: Leontopodium
- Species: L. kamtschaticum

Binomial name
- Leontopodium kamtschaticum Kom.

= Leontopodium kamtschaticum =

Species of flowering plant

Leontopodium kamtschaticum is a species of plant in the family Asteraceae. It is native to the Kamchatka Peninsula, Russia.
