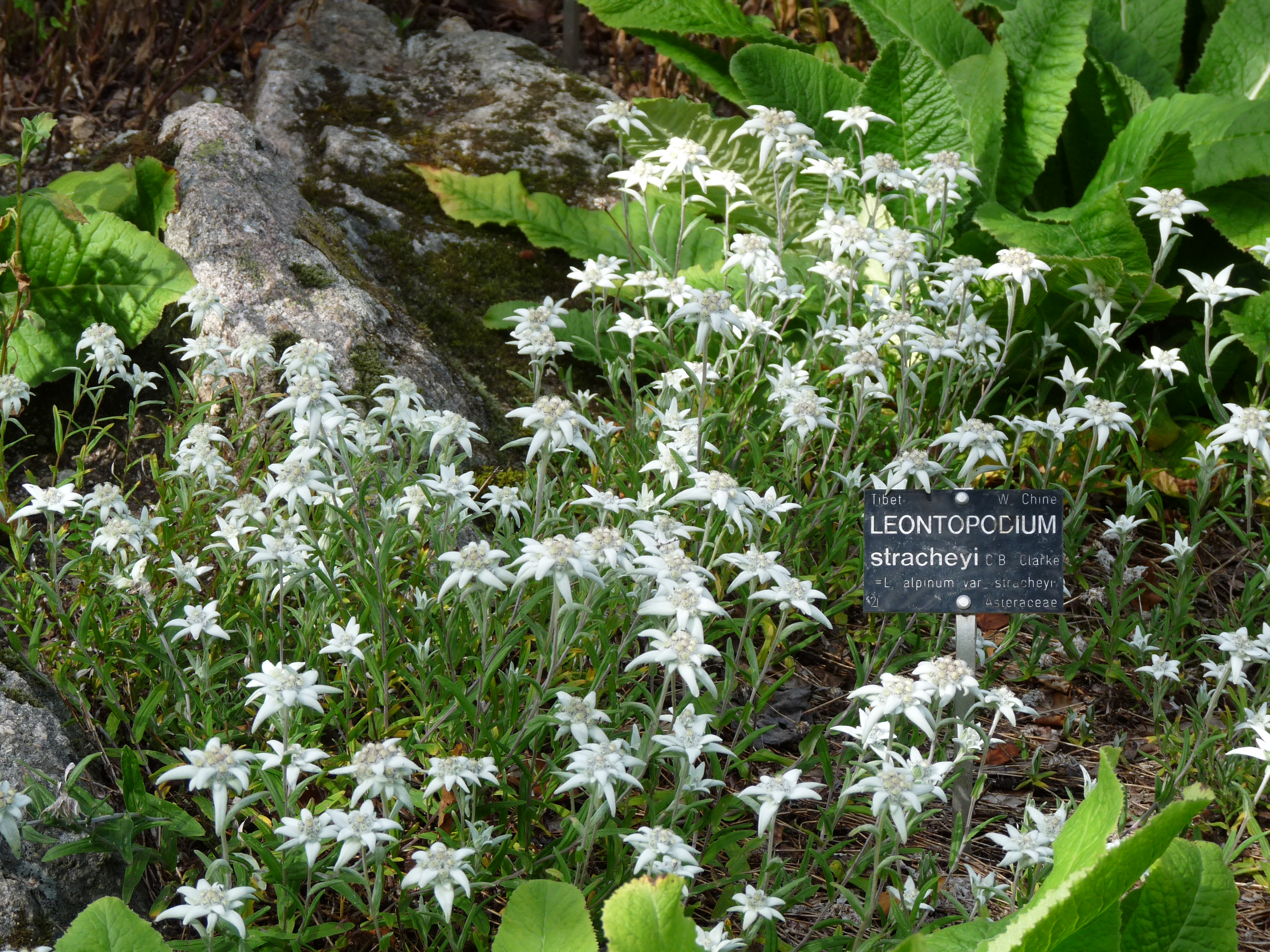

Scientific classification
- Kingdom: Plantae
- Clade: Tracheophytes
- Clade: Angiosperms
- Clade: Eudicots
- Clade: Asterids
- Order: Asterales
- Family: Asteraceae
- Genus: Leontopodium
- Species: L. stracheyi

Binomial name
- Leontopodium stracheyi C.B.Clarke ex Hemsl.

Synonyms
- Gnaphalium stracheyi Franch.; Leontopodium alpinum var. stracheyi Hook.f.; Leontopodium sinense var. stracheyi (Hook.f.) Beauverd

= Leontopodium stracheyi =

Species of flowering plant

Leontopodium stracheyi is a species of plant in the family Asteraceae. It is native to China, Bhutan, India and Nepal.
