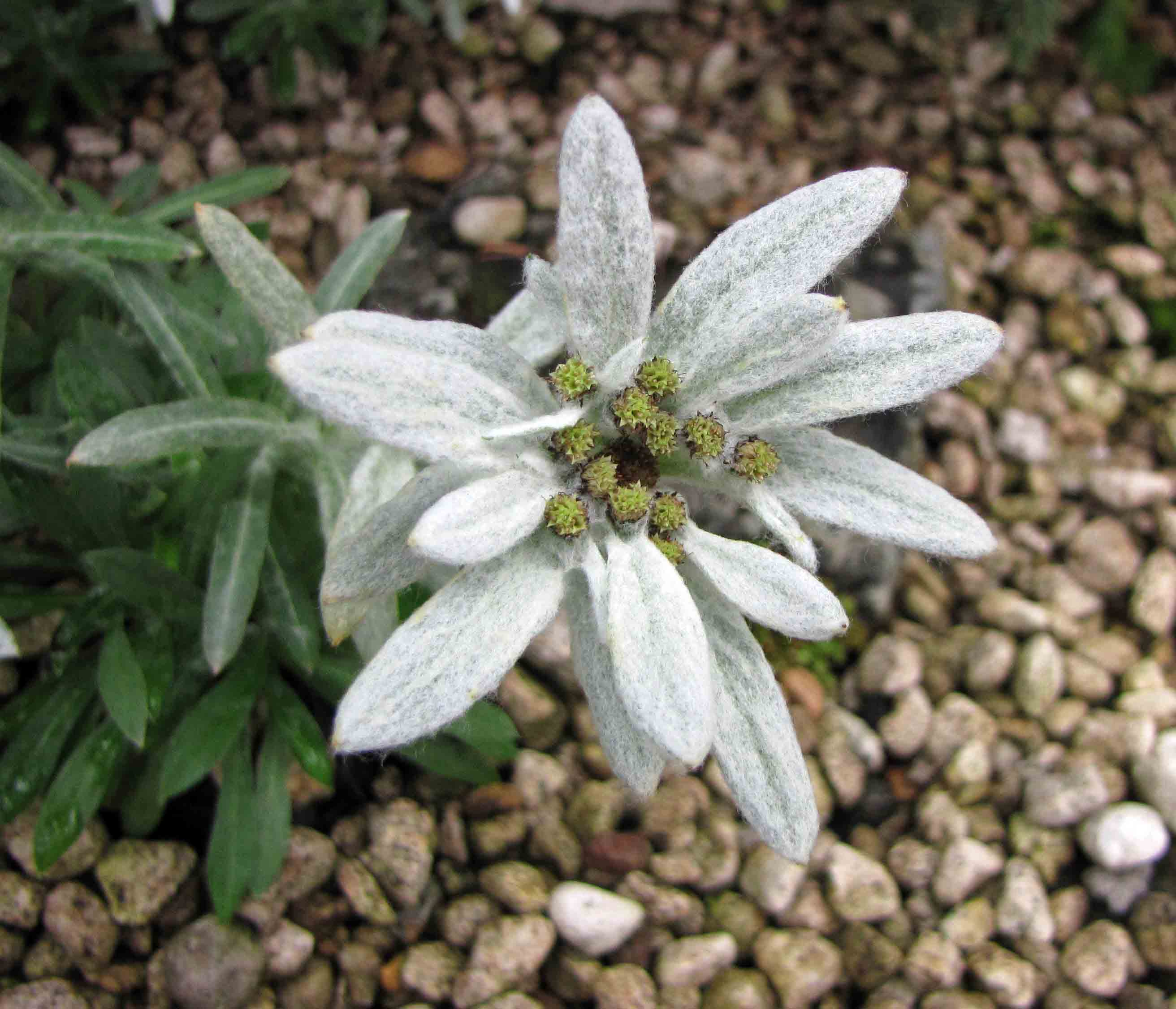

Scientific classification
- Kingdom: Plantae
- Clade: Tracheophytes
- Clade: Angiosperms
- Clade: Eudicots
- Clade: Asterids
- Order: Asterales
- Family: Asteraceae
- Genus: Leontopodium
- Species: L. coreanum

Binomial name
- Leontopodium coreanum Nakai

= Leontopodium coreanum =

Species of flowering plant

Leontopodium coreanum, also known as Korean edelweiss, is a species of plant in the family Asteraceae. It is native to Korea and comprises two varieties: Leontopodium coreanum var. coreanum and Leontopodium coreanum var. hallaisanense.

It was first described by Takenoshin Nakai in 1917.
