= Jeff Bernat =

Filipino-American musician (born 1989)

- Born: December 11, 1989 (age 36); Subic, Philippines
- Origin: Reno, Nevada
- Genres: R&B; Nu soul
- Occupations: Singer, songwriter, record producer
- Instrument: Vocals
- Years active: 2012–present
- Labels: Coridel Entertainment; P-Vine Records
- Website: jeff-bernat.com

Jeff Bernat (born December 11, 1989) is a Filipino-American singer, songwriter and record producer. He debuted in 2012 with the album, The Gentleman Approach, and developed a significant fan base in South Korea after the album track, "Call You Mine," was featured on the 2014 Korean drama, You Are My Destiny.

== Early life ==
Bernat was born in Subic, Philippines, but grew up in Reno, Nevada.

== Discography ==
=== Studio albums ===
Title	Album details	Peak chart positions	Sales
Title	Album details	KOR	Sales
The Gentleman Approach	Released: May 22, 2012; Label: Clear Company; Formats: CD, digital download; Track listing: 1. Bonjour (Intro); 2. Cool Girls; 3. Just Vibe; 4. Doesn't Matter; 5. My Dear; 6. Ms. Seductive; 7. Girl at the Coffee Shop; 8. If You Wonder; 9. Call You Mine (feat. Geologic); 10. Groovin'; 11. Moonlight Chemistry; 12. With Love (feat. Mosaek)	—	—N/a
Modern Renaissance	Released: December 13, 2013; Label: Clear Company; Formats: CD, digital download; Track listing: 1. Intro; 2. First Class; 3. Workflow (feat. Dumbfoundead); 4. Higher; 5. Heaven Sent; 6. Pillow Talk; 7. Boogie Down; 8. Lavish; 9. Mind Vs Heart; 10. Dream Team; 11. Plenty Of Reasons; 12. Various Places	—	—N/a
In the Meantime	Released: January 16, 2016; Label: Coridel Entertainment; Formats: CD, digital download; Track listing: 1. For You (Intro); 2. This and That; 3. What'cha Need; 4. Lapdance; 5. No Time for Sleep (Interlude); 6. Love Affair; 7. Back Seat; 8. If I Could; 9. Queen; 10. Think of the Time; 11. I Remember When	—	—N/a
Afterwords	Released: May 24, 2017; Label: Coridel Entertainment; Formats: CD, digital download; Track listing: 1. Situations; 2. In The Mood; 3. West Coast Getaway (feat. The Cool Kids); 4. Slow Jam Hour (Interlude); 5. Come Thru (feat. Asher Roth); 6. Birthday Suit; 7. Once Upon A Time; 8. You Could Be (Interlude); 9. Hypnotized (feat. Blu); 10. Reassurance; 11. Other Half; 12. Miles in Between (feat. Joyce Wrice)	—	—N/a
"—" denotes releases that did not chart.

=== Extended plays ===
Title	Album details	Peak chart positions	Sales		
Title	Album details	KOR	Sales		
Sleeptalk (with Eponym & Esta)	Released: September 5, 2014; Label: Soul Wings; Formats: CD, digital download; Track listing: 1. Grand Pendulum; 2. Flashy Words; 3. Annie Hall; 4. Sleeptalk; 5. Escapism	—	—N/a		
She Loves Me Not	Released: February 15, 2019; Label: Jeff Bernat; Formats: Digital download, streaming; No. / Title / Length; 1. / "Changes" / 2:24; 2. / "Mistake" / 3:45; 3. / "Pretend" / 3:19; 4. / "She Loves Me Not" / 3:37	—		Love, Jeffrey	Released: January 5, 2024; Label: Jeff Bernat; Formats: Digital (Streaming); Track listing: 1. Chamomile; 2. Waste No Time; 3. Better With You; 4. Daydream; 5. Paces
"—" denotes releases that did not chart.

=== Singles ===
Title	Year	Peak chart positions	Sales	Album
Title	Year	KOR	Sales	Album
As a lead artist
"Call You Mine" (feat. Geologic)	2012	69	KOR: 2,500,000	The Gentleman Approach
"Heaven Sent"	2013	—	KOR: 33,996	Modern Renaissance
"Pillow Talk"	2013	41	KOR: 188,987	Modern Renaissance
"Distance" (with Eponym & Esta)	2014	—		Non-album singles
"Come On Over" (with Doplamingo)	2014	—	KOR: 40,431	Non-album singles
"Sleeptalk" (with Eponym & Esta)	2014	—	KOR: 5,639	Sleeptalk
"Make It Official" (with Scary P, feat. Crucial Star)	2014	—		Non-album singles
"Angel 2 Me" (with McKay)	2015	34	KOR: 66,629	Non-album singles
"Have Yourself a Merry Little Christmas"	2015	—	KOR: 8,621	Non-album singles
"Queen"	2016	—	KOR: 34,143	In The Meantime
"Pray" (with Gain)	2017	82	KOR: 20,119	Non-album single
"Once Upon a Time"	2017	—	KOR: 3,636	Afterwords
"Da Ra Da" (with Wheein, B.O.)	2017	43	KOR: 74,940	Purple
"Changes"	2018	—		Non-album single
"Wrong About Forever"	2019	—		She Loves Me Not
"Summer Dresses"	2019	—		Non-album singles
"Bored"	2020	—		Non-album singles
"Casual" (with Jesse Barrera, Johnny Stimson)	2020	—		Non-album singles
"This Time"	2021	—		Non-album singles
As a featured artist
"what2do" (Dean feat. Crush, Jeff Bernat)	2016	41	KOR: 354,432	130 mood: TRBL
"Are You Down?" (Kero One feat. Jeff Bernat)	2018	—		Reflection Eternal
"—" denotes releases that did not chart.

=== Soundtrack appearances ===
Title	Year	Peak chart positions	Sales	Album
Title	Year	KOR	Sales	Album
"Be The One"	2014	59	KOR: 89,667	You Are My Destiny OST Part 2
"Romance"	2018	—		Risky Romance OST Part 7
