= 130 Mood: TRBL =

EP by Dean
- Released: March 25, 2016
- Recorded: 2015–2016
- Genres: Alternative R&B; hip hop
- Length: 24:07
- Language: Korean
- Labels: Joombas; Universal Music Group
- Producers: Deanfluenza; 2xxx!

Singles from 130 Mood: TRBL
- 1. "I Love It" Released: October 23, 2015; 2. "Pour Up" Released: November 6, 2015; 3. "Bonnie & Clyde" Released: March 21, 2016; 4. "D (Half Moon)" Released: March 23, 2016; 5. "what2do" Released: June 29, 2016

130 Mood: TRBL is the debut extended play by South Korean singer Dean. It was released by Joombas and Universal Music Group on March 24, 2016.

== Background and release ==
On March 21, Dean released a music video for "Bonnie & Clyde", the first track from 130 Mood : TRBL, in which he plays the role of Clyde in a reenactment of Bonnie and Clyde. On March 23, a music video for another track, "D (Half Moon)" featuring Gaeko was released and a showcase was held in Gangnam, Seoul. The seven-track EP was released the following day, its title named after the racing number '130', which James Dean had painted on his car, and which embodies the same experimental spirit he feels about music. The 'TRBL' portion of the title is a stylisation of 'trouble'. The album is intended to narrate a love story through its consecutive tracks and was written and produced by Dean along with collaborators, with several of the tracks previously released as singles.

== Critical reception ==
Professional ratings
Review scores
Source	Rating
IZM	3.5/5 stars
The Star	8/10

Billboard K-Town columnist Jeff Benjamin described the chart position on the Heatseekers Albums chart uncommon for a K-pop act, and especially for a debut release. He said that the album was an "impressive debut creatively that pushes R&B ahead into the future with its compositions and collaborations – notably the woozy "Pour Up" featuring Zico of Block B, the Weeknd-recalling "21" and "What 2 Do" with Korean R&B star Crush and L.A. singer Jeff Bernat." The album was picked number 5, as one of the 10 Best K-Pop Albums of 2016 by Billboard. The Star gave the album 8 stars out of 10, and praised the album, saying it "soothes and tantalises", and is an "impressive debut album." Bandwagon gave the album a positive review, "His songwriting in 130 Mood: TRBL shows. His future R&B production is top-class, and his ability to write memorable hooks and sultry, resonant melodies is on full display through the short seven-track record." IZM praised Dean's vocals and melody of the album, especially the track "21", noticing that his talent reaches its peak on that track.

== Commercial performance ==
The EP charted at No. 10 on the Gaon Album Chart, No. 3 on the Billboard World Albums chart, and No. 22 on the Billboard Heatseekers Albums chart, while "Bonnie & Clyde" entered Billboard's World Digital Songs chart at No. 12.

== Track listing ==
130 Mood: TRBL track listing
No.	Title	Lyrics	Music	Arrangement	Length
1.	"And You? (Outro)" (어때 (Outro); eottae)	Deanfluenza	Deanfluenza, 2xxx!	2xxx!	3:33
2.	"Pour Up" (풀어; pul-eo; featuring Zico)	Deanfluenza, Zico	Deanfluenza, Jayrah Gibson, Count Justice	Count Justice	3:36
3.	"Bonnie & Clyde"	Deanfluenza	Deanfluenza, 2xxx!	2xxx!, Deanfluenza	1:53
4.	"What2do" (featuring Crush, Jeff Bernat)	Deanfluenza, Jeff Bernat	Deanfluenza, Hyuk Shin, Jeff Bernat, JBird, Crush	JBird	3:06
5.	"D (Half Moon)" (featuring Gaeko)	Deanfluenza, Gaeko	Deanfluenza, Hyuk Shin, Osinachi Nwanari, 2xxx!, Chek Parren	Hyuk Shin, Osinachi Nwanari, 2xxx!, Deanfluenza, Chek Parren	3:34
6.	"I Love It" (featuring Dok2)	Deanfluenza, Dok2	Deanfluenza, Jayrah Gibson, B.A.M.	B.A.M.	3:27
7.	"21"	Deanfluenza	Deanfluenza, Reone, 2xxx!, Delly Boi, JBird	Reone, 2xxx!, Delly Boi, Deanfluenza, JBird	4:13
Total length:					24:07

== Charts and sales ==
=== Weekly charts ===
Weekly chart performance for 130 Mood: TRBL
Chart (2017)	Peak position
South Korean Albums (Gaon)	10
US Heetseekers Albums (Billboard)	22
US World Albums (Billboard)	3

=== Sales ===
Sales for 130 Mood: TRBL
Country	Sales
South Korea	17,391

== Awards and nominations ==
Awards and nominations for 130 Mood: TRBL
Year	Award-Giving Body	Category	Recipient	Result
2016	Mnet Asian Music Awards	Song of the Year	"D (Half Moon)"	Nominated
2017	Korean Hip-Hop Awards	Album of the Year	130 mood: TRBL	Nominated
2017	Korean Hip-Hop Awards	R&B Track of the Year	"D (half moon)"	Won
2017	14th Korean Music Awards	Best R&B & Soul Album	130 mood: TRBL	Nominated
2017	14th Korean Music Awards	Best R&B & Soul Song	"21"	Nominated

== Release history ==
Release history and formats for 130 Mood: TRBL
Region	Date	Format	Label	Ref
Various	March 25, 2016	CD, Digital download	Joombas, Universal Music Group	
