= Dean (South Korean singer) =

South Korean singer

Dean 권혁
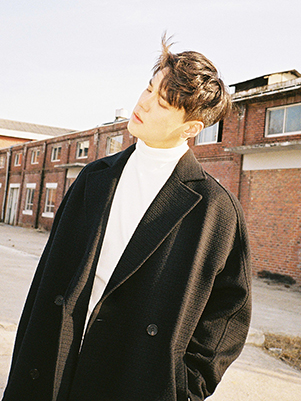
- Dean in January 2016

Background information
- Also known as: Deanfluenza; Deantrbl
- Born: Kwon Hyuk; November 10, 1992 (age 34); Hongeun-dong, Seoul, South Korea
- Origin: Seoul, South Korea
- Genres: Alternative R&B; R&B; hip hop; neo soul
- Occupations: Singer; songwriter; rapper; record producer; music video director
- Instrument: Vocals
- Years active: 2013–present
- Labels: Joombas Co Ltd.; You.will.knovv; Island; Universal

Korean name
- Hangul: 권혁
- Hanja: 權革
- RR: Gwon Hyeok
- MR: Kwŏn Hyŏk

Kwon Hyuk (Korean: 권혁; born November 10, 1992), better known by his stage name Dean (딘), is a South Korean alternative R&B singer-songwriter, rapper and record producer. On March 25, 2016, he released his debut EP, 130 Mood: TRBL, and multiple collaborations with American and South Korean artists. In 2017, he appeared as one of the producers on the South Korean rap competition TV show Show Me the Money 6 with Zico. He is part of the hip hop crew Fanxy Child with fellow singers Zico, Crush, Penomeco, Millic, and Stay Tuned.

== Life and career ==
=== Early life and career ===
Kwon Hyuk was born and raised in Hongeun-dong, Seoul. He developed an interest in American hip hop and rap in middle school, and began singing in high school. At that time, he considered music as an "escape from studying," rather than an occupation. He began writing songs in his room, which he initially kept hidden from his parents. Although he was the first musician in his family, his parents enjoyed music and supported his decision to become an artist.

He began his career at the age of sixteen, performing with hip-hop artist Keith Ape. By eighteen, he was writing tracks for K-pop idols, under the name 'Deanfluenza'. The name originated from actor James Dean, whose rebellious image appealed to him, and the word 'influenza', signifying his desire to make a "viral" impact on the music industry.

At the age of twenty, he was under the tutelage of Joombas Music Group CEO and producer Hyuk Shin, employed with the songwriting team of the Los Angeles-based company whose works include EXO's "Growl" and Justin Bieber's "One Less Lonely Girl". He was credited on tracks including Exo's "Black Pearl" and VIXX's "Voodoo Doll".

=== 2015: U.S. and South Korean debut ===
Dean debuted in the United States in July 2015 with the single "I'm Not Sorry", featuring Grammy winner Eric Bellinger. This set him apart from other Korean singers who collaborated with American artists, most of whom began their careers in Korea. FACT UK magazine's Claire Lobenfeld subsequently referred to his work with Bellinger, when listing him as an R&B artist to watch for in 2016, noting that artists like Justin Bieber and Chris Brown had also worked with Bellinger. That year, he also collaborated with Mila J on "Here & Now" and Anderson Paak on "Put My Hands on You".

He debuted in South Korea in October that year, and his second single "Pour Up", featuring Block B's rapper Zico, was named Best R&B and Soul Song at the Korean Music Awards on February 29, 2016. He also collaborated with Korean hip-hop artists Zion.T, Crush, and Junggigo on the single "247", Dok2 on "I Love It", and Dynamic Duo on "How You Doin'?".

=== 2016: 130 Mood: TRBL, and music producing ===
On January 8, 2016, Dean released the single "What 2 Do", featuring Crush and Filipino-American singer Jeff Bernat, On March 25, he released his first EP 130 Mood: TRBL, which he wrote and produced with collaborators. The EP charted at No. 10 on the Gaon Album Chart, No. 3 on the Billboard World Albums chart, and No. 22 on the Billboard Heatseekers Albums chart, while "Bonnie & Clyde" entered Billboard's World Digital Songs chart at No. 12. The EP was well received, and was nominated for Album of the Year and Best R&B & Soul Album on Korean Hip-Hop Awards and Korean Music Awards, respectively, as well the two track on the album "D (half moon)" and "21" received multiple nominations.

In 2016 he collaborated with several artists, notably featuring on Taeyeon's single "Starlight", Heize's single "Shut Up & Groove" and "And July", and a collaboration on a single and music video with Zico and Crush, named "Bermuda Triangle", which debuted on Billboard's World Digital Songs chart at No. 3, making it the highest position he had received on that chart. He also placed for the first time on two "overall popularity" charts; he and his song "D (Half Moon)" featuring Gaeko debuted at No. 2 on the Billboard Twitter Emerging Artists chart and the song at No. 33 on the Billboard Twitter Top Tracks chart. On December 11, "Bermuda Triangle" won the weekly competition on the Inkigayo music show.

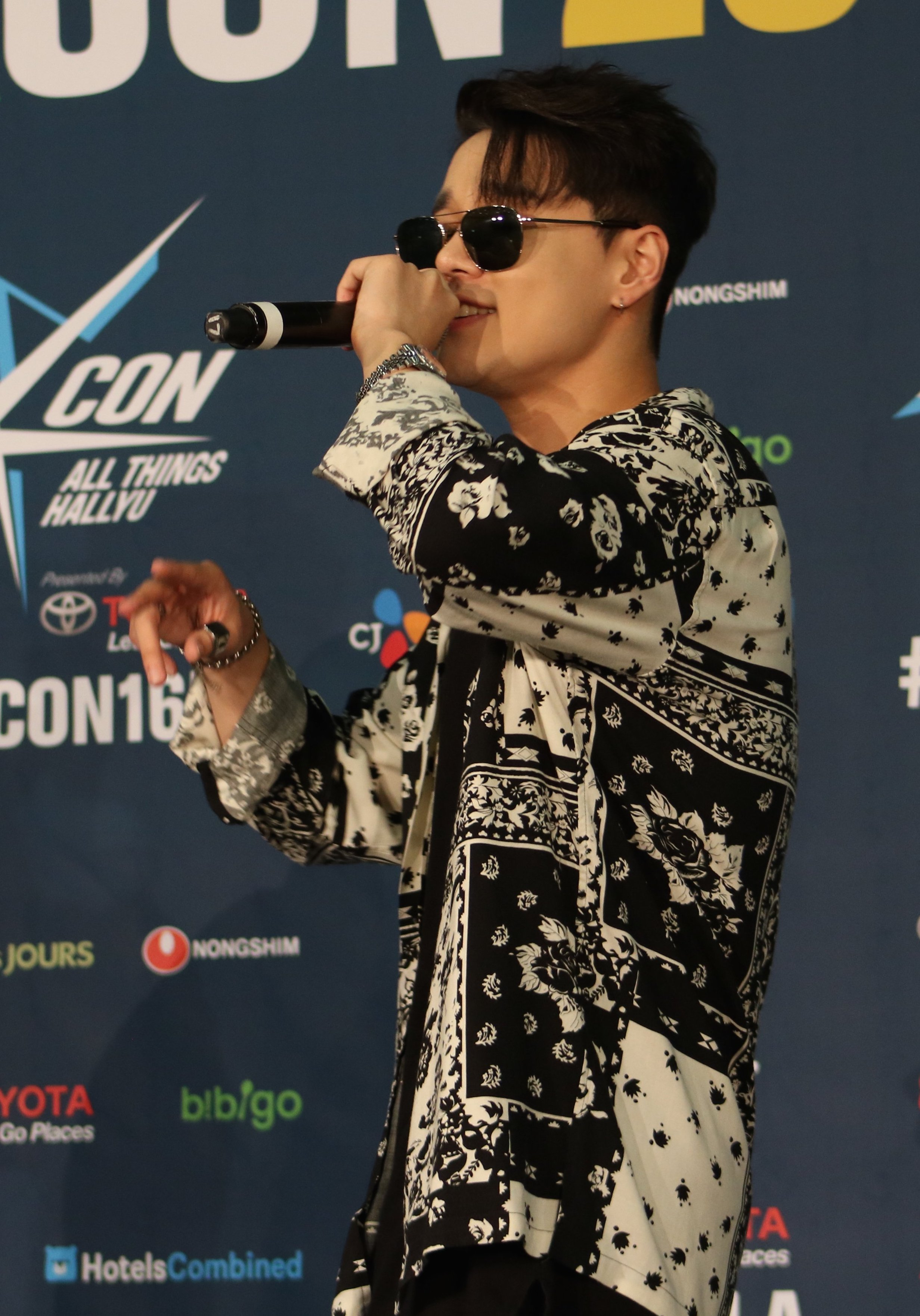
Dean at KCON LA 2016

Also, in 2016, Dean wrote and produced for other artists and music programs, such as two tracks for Lee Hi's album Seoulite; he also created songs for Block B, Boys Republic and BASTARZ, a Block B sub-unit consisting of three members. He also appeared on the JTBC show Two Yoo Project Sugar Man as a producer, arranging a well-received version of the Mose song, "It's Love," for a performance by iKON, and "Je T'aime" performed by Winner. He prepared two tracks for a September 2 appearance as producer on the Unpretty Rapstar 3 show where contestants would use the tracks in the rap competition.

=== 2017–2019: Widespread recognition and collaborations ===
On February 17, 2017, Dean released his first solo work in eleven months, a single album Limbo, with two tracks, "Come Over" featuring Yerin Baek, and "The Unknown Guest". "Come Over", the title track, quickly rose to the top of several South Korean music charts. The accompanying music video was created and directed by artist Seong Lib, who had also worked with SHINee. In April, he made his first-time appearance as a producer on the hip-hop audition show Show Me the Money 6, along with fellow artist Zico, where they won the show as the winning producers. At the end of the year, he released the single "Instagram", the song topped all local music charts in South Korea.

In April 2017, Dean also participated in a campaign with Kolon Sport alongside Bae Doo Na, to protect Jeju Island's Leontopodium hallaisanense, which is an endangered flower species. In July, Kakaopay released a commercial advert featuring Dean and a track he produced for the collaboration (Get the Feeling). Dean also acted in the advertisement to promote the Korean digital wallet service. Later that year in September, Dean also collaborated with Puma, on a campaign called 'Run the Streets', for which he produced a track and starred in a commercial video. In November 2018, he has since released single "Dayfly", collaborating with artists Rad Museum and former F(x) (group) member Sulli.

On April 18, 2019, Dean was featured along with labelmate Tabber on ROMderful's song "1 Missed Call" from his debut album Press L To Continue. On May 25, 2019, Dean released his fourth English language single "Howlin' 404" at the same time of his performance during Seoul Jazz Festival 2019. On July 12, 2019, it was announced that Dean alongside FANXY CHILD (Zico, Crush, Penomeco, Millic and Stay Tuned) would be holding concerts in Seoul, South Korea at the Olympic Handball Gymnasium on August 10 and 11, 2019 which speculated a comeback for the crew after two years. On July 31, 2019, it was announced that FANXY CHILD would make a comeback with their single album "Y". The single album "Y" was officially released on August 8, 2019, with a music video released on KOZ Entertainment's official YouTube channel. Dean appeared on Crush's sophomore album From Midnight to Sunrise on the song "Wake Up" which he co-wrote and produced with Crush, and was released on December 5, 2019. The group would return with another single in 2026.

=== 2020–present: Hiatus and features ===
On February 5, 2020, Dean was featured on Korean-American rapper Nafla's single "Under the Ground" from his album u n u part. 2 which was released on March 24. On August 4, Dean and labelmate Miso participated in a music collaboration titled "Imagination" with GQ Korea and Burberry for the TB Summer Monogram Collection. Dean described the song as "a message to this reality" to "find the lost imagination" during the COVID-19 pandemic and "a situation where people are busy looking for a different reality than before" and "even in such a confusing situation, through imagination, you can go here and there, too". The next day, Dean announced his upcoming label compilation album which was followed by the first single "breath" that features labelmates Rad Museum and Mokyo.

On August 10, Dean collaborated on the track "3AM Freestyle" with labelmate Tabber and South Korean rapper Kim Ximya which was uploaded to you.will.knovv's YouTube channel. Dean featured on Tabber's debut mixtape Deep End on the track "Honey!" released on August 13. Dean co-directed Tabber's music video for "Look At My/Like A Vampire" with Russian photographer and visual artist Anton Reva which was released on September 8. Dean co-composed Rad Museum's song "Wet Umbrella" from his single album SINK which was released on December 10. Dean featured on Mokyo's debut album accent fried on the track "paranoid" which was released on December 21.

On March 10, 2021, it was revealed that Dean would feature on South Korean singer-songwriter IU's upcoming fifth studio album Lilac, on the song "Troll" which was released on March 25 along with the rest of the album. The two previously collaborated when Dean made a special appearance at IU's Palette Tour in Busan on November 3, 2017, where they performed a duet of IU's "Can't Love You Anymore".

On March 7, 2022, Dean and Lee Hi were featured on Rad Museum's song "Off-Line", the 7th track from Rad Museum's first full-length album: [RAD]. The accompanying music video was released on you.will.knovv's YouTube channel on the same day and starred Rad Museum, Lee Hi, and Dean.

On February 14, 2023, Dean appeared as a feature on Wesley Joseph's song "Sugar Dive". The song and music video were released ahead of Wesley Joseph's EP Glow.

In November 2023, Dean reactivated his Instagram account and archived all of his posts, fueling speculation about an upcoming comeback. It was later announced that Dean would release the single "Die 4 You" on November 18, his first solo single in over 4 years. It was his first song to chart on the Circle Digital Chart in over 5 years, debuting at number 191, and peaking at number 9.

In early 2024, Dean appeared as a feature on Tabber's song "Chi-Ka". The song and music video were released ahead of Dean and Tabber's multi-city tour of Asia in March 2024, and ahead of Tabber's EP Madness Always Turns to Sadness. Later in the year, he collaborated with French Kiwi Juice on the two-part single titled 3:33, including Ctrl and NASA. It was released in November 2024, his first under a new deal with Island Records.

In May 2026, Dean again collaborated with Anderson .Paak on "Aftertaste", a single on Paak's feature film K-Pops!.

== Reception ==
In 2016, Dean became the first Asian artist to perform at Spotify House at SXSW, alongside international artists including Miguel and Chvrches. U.S. magazine Spin wrote that "the Bryson Tiller-indebted youngster – and recent Universal signee – had some attendees comparing him to a young Usher." Vibe commented that he had a "smooth sound that reminds you of 90s era Usher to this year's Bryson Tiller flow." In New York, he performed eight of his songs at Flash Factory at a concert Billboard K-Town called "stunning". He was called the "R&B prince of Asia". He was listed as one of the K-pop artists "you should know" from KCON NY and LA, by USA Today's Hoai-Tran Bui, who said "Los Angeles is getting their own honey-voiced R&B artist with Dean, whose sultry tunes are a shade darker than the more mellow Crush."

== Discography ==
=== Extended plays ===
- 130 Mood: TRBL (2016)
