= Die 4 You =

2023 single by Dean

Single by Dean
- Language: Korean; English
- Released: November 18, 2023
- Genre: Alternative R&B
- Length: 3:14
- Label: Universal
- Composers: Deanfluenza; T.Y; Osvaldo Aritonang; Tanisha T. Sadewo
- Lyricist: Deanfluenza
- Producers: Deanfluenza; T.Y; Galdive

Dean singles chronology
"Sugar Dive" (2023)	"Die 4 You" (2023)	"NASA" (2024)

Music video
- "Die 4 You" on YouTube

"Die 4 You" (stylized in all caps) is a song recorded by South Korean musician Dean. It was released on November 18, 2023, by Universal Music Group and distributed by Joombas Company. An alternative R&B track, it was issued as a stand-alone single and Dean's first as a lead artist in four and a half years. The song peaked at number nine of South Korea's national Circle Digital Chart and entered the New Zealand Hot Singles at number 15. "Die 4 You" also received the R&B Track of the Year award at the 2024 Korean Hip-hop Awards.

== Background and composition ==
Dean began writing songs for other artists in 2013 and embarked on a solo career two years later. He released his debut single "I'm Not Sorry" in 2015 and issued a handful of successful singles thereafter. His work earned him the Best R&B and Soul Song award for "Pour Up" featuring Zico at the 18th Korean Music Awards in 2016 and the R&B Track of the Year award at the inaugural Korean Hip-hop Awards for "D (Half Moon)" with Gaeko the following year. Dean began working on an album in 2019 and updated on its progress in September 2021. Eight years after debuting, he had yet to produce a full-length solo album. In early 2023, Dean deactivated his social media accounts, leading to speculation about his retirement from the industry.

"Die 4 You" is an alternative R&B song with a refined melody. The lyrics were penned by Dean (under the pseudonym Deanfluenza), who composed the track with T.Y, Osvaldo Aritonang, and Tanisha T. Sadewo. Record production was handled by Deanfluenza, T.Y, and Indonesian electronica duo Galdive. The winter song opens with a lonely acoustic guitar and music is layered in the chorus. Thematically, "Die 4 You" deals with lost love.

== Release and promotion ==
Beginning in November 2023, flyers reporting Dean's disappearance were disseminated throughout downtown Seoul. On November 10, Dean reactivated his Instagram account after a lengthy period of inactivity and uploaded a video of himself singing a cover of Shiloh Dynasty's "I'm Drunk and Confused" while playing the piano. Three days later, Universal Music Group confirmed the release of an upcoming single, Dean's first as a lead artist in four and a half years since "Howlin' 404" in May 2019. The single's title was unveiled a day ahead of its release. "Die 4 You" and its visualizer video were released on November 18, 2023, followed by its music video on December 23.

== Reception ==
Rating "Die 4 You" three and a half stars out of five, Lee Seung-won of online magazine IZM described it as both "chillingly cold and warm like a fireplace". He noted that Dean minimizes the music's highs and lows while sustaining a "comfortable mood" throughout the track.

On the chart dated November 12–18, 2023, "Die 4 You" debuted at number 191 on South Korea's national Circle Digital Chart. In its second week, it rose to number nine. On the New Zealand Hot Singles chart, the song opened at number 15. The song won the R&B Track of the Year award at the 2024 Korean Hip-hop Awards.

== Charts ==
=== Weekly charts ===
Weekly chart performance for "Die 4 You"
Chart (2023)	Peak position
New Zealand Hot Singles (RMNZ)	15
South Korea (Circle)	9

=== Monthly charts ===
Monthly chart performance for "Die 4 You"
Chart (2023)	Position
South Korea (Circle)	73
