= Instagram (Dean song) =

Dean song

Single by Dean
- Language: Korean
- Released: December 26, 2017
- Genre: R&B; soul
- Length: 4:15
- Label: Universal Music Korea
- Songwriters: Deanfluenza; Highhopes; 2xxx!; Jusén; Miso; Reone; Chekparren
- Producer: Deanfluenza

Dean singles chronology
"Tiny Little Boy" (2017)	"Instagram" (2017)	"Piss on Me" (2018)

Music video
- "Instagram" on YouTube

"Instagram" (stylized in all lowercase) is a song recorded by South Korean musician Dean. It was released on December 26, 2017, by Universal Music Korea and distributed by Joombas Company. An R&B and soul track, it deals with the "stuffy, gloomy" feeling of scrolling through one's Instagram feed late at night.

Despite a lack of promotional activities, "Instagram" topped South Korea's national Gaon Digital Chart and peaked at number two on Billboard magazine's K-pop Hot 100. The single sold over 2.5 million downloads domestically, earning Dean accolades such as the Best Composer of the Year award at the 2018 Mnet Asian Music Awards and R&B Track of the Year at the 2019 Korean Hip-hop Awards.

== Background and composition ==
"To see how so many pretty, handsome, and cool people there are on Instagram... I kept comparing myself to them, and my friends going to these cool places while I was worn out from working in the studio, it felt like I was a lonely island placed away from all those people. That was really hard on me."

—Dean on Instagram

Dean, wanting to craft an album like himself, thought that, "if I speak truthfully about myself, people could empathize with me". He began to objectively observe himself and took note of his tendency to check the social networking service Instagram. He realized that, in following people he admired and liked, he felt "infinitely small and lacking" by comparison, which led him to depression. He "was sure I wasn't the only one" experiencing relative deprivation. Dean conceived "Instagram" with a degree of similarity to the title character from the novel Robinson Crusoe (1719) living in a city.

"Instagram" was written by Dean (under the pseudonym Deanfluenza), Highhopes, 2xxx!, Jusén, Miso, Reone, and Chekparren. Musically, it is a R&B and soul track. The song lyrics express the "stuffy, gloomy" feeling of scrolling through one's Instagram feed late at night in bed. Dean described it as a "dark" song amidst the Christmas and holiday season, the "brightest" time of the year. He further elaborated that "Instagram" does not offer any consolation or solutions, but acts as a "crying friend by your side that, like you, lives a difficult life with its ups and downs". He describes a girl with a bob cut in the song, a reference to an ex-girlfriend. He said that the song ends on a "low note" to encourage the listener to "stop snooping around your ex's Instagram page".

== Release and promotion ==
On December 19, 2017, Dean began teasing "Instagram" with a photo post on his Instagram account. He announced the forthcoming single in a second photo post four days later. "Instagram", along with a music video teaser, were concurrently released on December 26. KBS and MBC banned "Instagram" from syndication on its networks after deeming the song "unfit for broadcast". Due to its title, the companies determined that it violated regulations for mentioning a specific product brand. On the day of its release, singer-songwriter IU published a pair of cover videos of the song onto her Instagram account. Her post received over 340,000 likes within 12 hours of being shared. A black and white music video for "Instagram" was uploaded on January 30, 2018.

== Critical reception ==
Entertainment news website Oh My Star chose "Instagram" as one of the most memorable songs of the year. Hong Seok-woo of Cine21 magazine felt that the lyrics were "touching" and complimented the guitars on the track. Billboard magazine ranked the song at number thirteen on its list of the 20 Best K-pop Songs of 2018. Writing for Paper magazine, columnist Jeff Benjamin described the record as "one of the most relatable tracks out this year" and listed it at number nine on the publication's Top 20 K-pop Songs of 2018.

Dean and co-composer Highhopes shared the Best Composer of the Year award for "Instagram" at the 2018 Mnet Asian Music Awards. Dean also earned nominations for Best Hip Hop & Urban Music and Song of the Year at the ceremony. "Instagram" won the R&B Track of the Year award at the 2019 Korean Hip-hop Awards. The single was also nominated for Song of the Year – December at the Gaon Chart Music Awards.

== Commercial performance ==
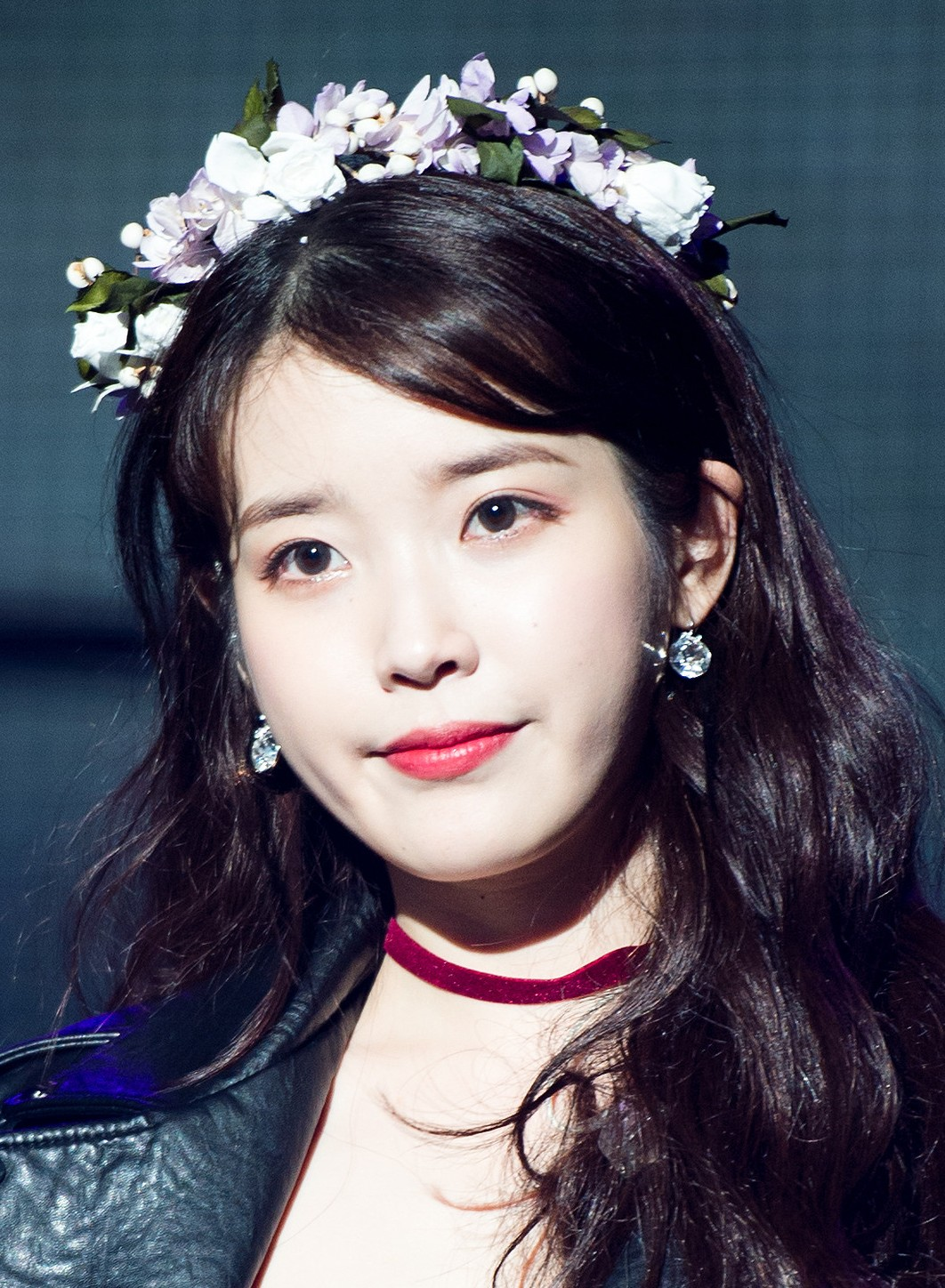
IU's "Instagram" cover was credited in part for the single's success

"Instagram" was met with immediate success despite a lack of promotional activities following its distribution on online music stores. The single's commercial performance was attributed to its "trendy" melody and resonating lyrical content, in addition to IU's cover and "word of mouth" via social networking services. Its strong showing on online music stores earned Dean the moniker "digital powerhouse".

On the chart dated December 24–30, 2017, "Instagram" debuted at number one on South Korea's national Gaon Digital Chart. It was the most downloaded song of the week in the country, selling 171,979 digital downloads. The single ranked within the top 100 for 33 non-consecutive weeks. On Billboard magazine's K-pop Hot 100 chart dated January 3, 2018, "Instagram" debuted at number ten. The following week, it rose to its peak at number two. On Gaon Music Chart's year-end report for 2018, "Instagram" ranked at number 23 on its list of best-performing singles. As of June 2019, it has sold over 2.5 million downloads domestically.

== Credits and personnel ==
Credits adapted from Melon and Tidal.

- 2xxx! – composition
- Chekparren – composition
- Dean – vocals, production, lyrics, composition, arrangement
- Highhopes – composition, arrangement
- Jusén – composition
- Miso – composition
- Reone – composition
- Christian Wright – mastering engineering, studio personnel

== Charts ==
=== Weekly charts ===
Weekly chart performance for "Instagram"
Chart (2017–18)	Peak position
South Korea (Gaon)	1
South Korea Bell (Gaon)	14
South Korea Ring (Gaon)	2
South Korea Singing Room (Gaon)	25
South Korea (K-pop Hot 100)	2

=== Monthly charts ===
Monthly chart performance for "Instagram"
Chart (2018)	Peak position
South Korea (Gaon)	2

=== Year-end charts ===
Year-end chart performance for "Instagram"
Chart (2018)	Peak position
South Korea (Gaon)	23

== Certifications ==
Certifications for "Instagram"
Region	Certification	Certified units/sales
Canada (Music Canada)	Gold	40,000^{‡}
^{‡} Sales+streaming figures based on certification alone.

== See also ==
- List of Gaon Digital Chart number ones of 2017
