= Show Me the Money 777 =

Season of television series

- Season 777
- Hosted by: Kim Jin-pyo; DJ Vani (Resident DJ)
- Judges: Team Just Music: Swings; Giriboy; Team VMC: Deepflow; Nucksal; Team Hi-Lite & AOMG: Paloalto; Code Kunst; Team Illionaire Ambition: The Quiett; Changmo
- Winner: Nafla
- Runners-up: (1st Runner-up); Loopy (2nd Runner-up); Kid Milli

Release
- Original network: Mnet
- Original release: September 7 – November 9, 2018

Season chronology
- ← Previous; Show Me the Money 6 Next → Show Me the Money 8

The seventh season of the series Show Me the Money, known as Show Me the Money 777 (also referred to as SMTM777), premiered on September 7, 2018, and ended on November 9, 2018. It is on broadcast every Friday at 23:00 KST on Mnet.

This season features judges Swings and Giriboy from Just Music, Deepflow and Nucksal of Vismajor Company (VMC), Paloalto of Hi-Lite Records and Code Kunst of AOMG, and The Quiett of Illionaire Records and Changmo of Ambition Musik.

Different from previous seasons, this season does not have the first preliminary round. Instead, the production crew watched over 13,000 audition videos and selected about 1,000 contestants. These selected contestants then were judged by the producers teams, and the qualified ones will move on to Round Two.

There is a new betting system that is used this season. 200 million won (the winner's final prize money) will be equally divided among the four producer teams (50 million won for each team) prior to Round Two, and can be used to evaluate each passed rapper's rap in the round.

The winner of this season was Nafla with Team Just Music's Swings and Giriboy as the winning producers.

== Judges ==
Team Just Music:

- Swings : Founder and rapper of Just Music, its sub-label Indigo Music, and recently established WEDAPLUGG Records. Previously participated in season 2 as a contestant under Team D.O, and in season 3 as a judge/producer alongside San E under Team Brand New Music.
- Giriboy : Rapper, songwriter and record producer signed under Just Music and WEDAPLUGG Records. Previously participated in season 3 as a contestant under Team YDG. Member of WYBH crew.

Team VMC (also known as Team 119):

- Deepflow : CEO, rapper and producer of Vismajor Company (VMC).
- Nucksal : Rapper signed under VMC. Previously participated in season 2 as a contestant, and in season 6 where he finished first runner-up.

Team Hi-Lite & AOMG (also known as Team CodePalo):

- Paloalto : Founder, rapper and producer of Hi-Lite Records. Previously participated in season 4 as a judge/producer for Team ZiPal.
- Code Kunst : Music producer signed under AOMG. Previously signed with HIGHGRND.

Team Illionaire Ambition:

- The Quiett : Co-founder, rapper and producer of Illionaire Records. Previously participated in seasons 3 and 5 as a judge/producer under Team Illionaire.
- Changmo : Rapper and producer signed under Ambition Musik, the sub-label of Illionaire Records. Previously auditioned in season 3.

== Teams ==
During Round Five of the competition, four contestants were chosen to be in each team as follows:

Team Just Music:

- ODEE : Rapper signed under Vismajor Company (VMC). Previously participated in season 3.
- Nafla : Rapper from Pasadena, California where he's the member of his label/crew MKIT RAIN and member of "42" crew. Gained popularity in the Korean hip-hop scene after his collaboration with Dynamic Duo in 2015.
- YunB : New York-based rapper/producer signed under Hi-Lite Records.
- OLNL : Korean rapper signed under STONESHIP. Member of WYBH and JUICEOVERALCOHOL crews, part of Korean rap duo AREYOUCHILDISH.

Team VMC (also known as Team 119):

- Chaboom : Veteran rapper signed under Lay Back Records. Member of project rap groups BLING THE CASH and GRAY ROOFTOP. During the 1st Live Performance Round, he revealed that he suffers from Guillain–Barré Syndrome, an auto-immune disorder, causing him to have difficulty in his everyday activities.
- Los : LA-based rapper signed under Feel GHood Music's sub-label GHood Life. Previously signed with Cycadelic Records. Previously auditioned in season 6.
- EK : Member of rap group/dance crew Most Badass Asian (M.B.A) under STONESHIP. Previously auditioned in SBS K-pop Star.
- Keem Hyo-eun : Rapper under Illionaire Records' sub-label Ambition Muzik. Previously auditioned in season 3, and in season 5 where he was a member of Team Illionaire. Also known by his moniker "Kenny Raw".

Team Hi-Lite & AOMG (also known as TEAMCODEPALO):

- pH-1 : New York-based rapper/producer signed under AOMG's sub-label H1GHR MUSIC. Member of collab duo Sous Chef with fellow contestant Owen Ovadoz.
- Kid Milli : Korean rapper under Just Music's sub-label Indigo Music. Member of COZYBOYS and WYBH crews. Former pro-gamer who once participated in StarCraft's semiprofessional tournament.
- Qwala : Member of the OSAMARI Crew (OSA). Previously auditioned in seasons 2, 5 and 6.
- Loopy : LA-based rapper/producer signed under record label/crew MKIT RAIN. Originally started as a producer, he decided to try rapping after moving to LA.

Team Illionaire Ambition (also known as QUAMO GANG):

- Superbee : A regular mainstay of Show Me The Money where he auditioned in the first three seasons and finally made it in season 4 as a member of Team YG and season 5 where he was the second runner-up and member of Team Illionaire. Formerly signed with Feel GHood Music's sub-label GHood Life and a member of the 82HottestMC's. Currently is a co-CEO of a recently established YNG & Rich Records with rapper Uneducated Kid. In an interview prior to season 5's final round, he jokingly stated that he'll keep competing in the future seasons until he finally becomes the champion.
- Lee Dong-min : Fourth runner-up in the first season of High School Rapper. Also known by his monikers RAPTO and ICE PUFF.
- D.Ark : Second youngest contestant in the show's history at 15 years old (Korean Age). Lived in China for 10 years and is trilingual in Korean, Chinese and English. Member of Blue Alien Crew. He was later involved in a sex scandal with his ex-girlfriend.
- Coogie : Rookie rapper who started rapping less than a year ago. Signed under ATM Seoul, which was then bought by Million Market. Became a member of YELOWS MOB crew after his elimination from the show (also known as YLS MOB).

== Rounds ==
Prior to Round One, about 13,000 contestants sent in their audition clips to the production crew and they will watch each clip and select about 1,000 to participate in Round One.

- Round One: Rapper Selection Round – After sending in their audition clips, those selected by the production crew will attend this round. These contestants will choose one of the four producer teams they want to be judged by, and they will be judged by their choice of the producer teams through a short a cappella rap. Chains are handed to contestants that have passed to the next round. 140 contestants advanced to the next round.
- Round Two: Rapper Open Evaluation Round – Contestants have one minute to rap in front of all judges and all passed contestants from Round One. At least one team of judges must pass the rapper in order to move on to Round Three, the Fight Money Battle Round. The team(s) that have passed the rapper can each place their bets to evaluate the rapper's rap, from a minimum of 100,000 won to a maximum of 5,000,000 won. Each passed rapper can be evaluated for a maximum of 20 million won. The total amount of money the passed rapper received will be carried over to Round Three as his/her Fight Money. A total of 60 contestants advanced to the next round.

List of Passed Rappers and Notable Failed Rappers at the Rapper Open Evaluation Round

Rapper	Team Just Music	Team VMC	Team Hi-Lite AOMG	Team Illionaire Ambition	Total Fight Money
Nafla	4,200,000	4,200,000	4,900,000	5,000,000	18,300,000
Superbee	2,500,000	700,000	3,000,000	3,000,000	9,200,000
Coogie	1,500,000	2,000,000	500,000	5,000,000	9,000,000
EK	1,000,000	3,000,000	3,000,000	1,000,000	8,000,000
pH-1	300,000	700,000	3,000,000	4,000,000	8,000,000
Chaboom	1,000,000	5,000,000	1,000,000	100,000	7,100,000
D.Ark	1,500,000	1,000,000	2,000,000	2,000,000	6,500,000
Keem Hyo-eun	3,000,000	2,000,000	1,000,000	FAIL (Note: There is a hidden rule on the show that the rapper that is currently signed under the company of the producer team will have to be failed by that producer team at the start of his/her rap.)	6,000,000
Los	Unrevealed	Unrevealed	Unrevealed	Unrevealed	5,500,000
Loopy	1,000,000	1,000,000	2,000,000	800,000	4,800,000
Choi Eun-seo	1,500,000	700,000	200,000	2,000,000	4,400,000
Kid Milli	FAIL	1,000,000	2,500,000	700,000	4,200,000
Lee Su-rin (Luda)	Unrevealed	Unrevealed	Unrevealed	Unrevealed	3,200,000
Reddy	800,000	800,000	1,000,000 (Note: Reddy is the only contestant that the hidden rule did not apply on. Reddy is signed under Hi-Lite Records, Paloalto's company.)	500,000	3,100,000
Chillin Homie	Unrevealed	Unrevealed	Unrevealed	Unrevealed	2,900,000
Changstarr	Unrevealed	Unrevealed	Unrevealed	Unrevealed	2,800,000
POY Muzeum	Unrevealed	Unrevealed	Unrevealed	Unrevealed	2,800,000
Snacky Chan	Unrevealed	Unrevealed	Unrevealed	Unrevealed	2,500,000
YunB	Unrevealed	Unrevealed	FAIL	Unrevealed	2,400,000
Ryno	Unrevealed	Unrevealed	Unrevealed	Unrevealed	2,300,000
Seo Il-gyo (Raw-fi)	Unrevealed	Unrevealed	Unrevealed	Unrevealed	2,200,000
NO:EL	FAIL	700,000	1,000,000	400,000	2,100,000
OLNL	Unrevealed	Unrevealed	Unrevealed	Unrevealed	2,000,000
Mac9	Unrevealed	Unrevealed	Unrevealed	Unrevealed	1,900,000
Boo Hyun-seok (Snap Out)	Unrevealed	Unrevealed	Unrevealed	Unrevealed	1,700,000
Owen Ovadoz	Unrevealed	Unrevealed	Unrevealed	Unrevealed	1,700,000
Slick O'domar	Unrevealed	Unrevealed	Unrevealed	Unrevealed	1,600,000
ODEE	Unrevealed	FAIL	Unrevealed	FAIL	1,500,000
Pento	Unrevealed	Unrevealed	Unrevealed	Unrevealed	1,200,000
Qwala	Unrevealed	Unrevealed	Unrevealed	Unrevealed	1,100,000
24 Flakko	Unrevealed	Unrevealed	Unrevealed	Unrevealed	900,000
Damndef	Unrevealed	Unrevealed	Unrevealed	Unrevealed	900,000
Rakon	Unrevealed	Unrevealed	Unrevealed	Unrevealed	900,000
Zene The Zilla	Unrevealed	Unrevealed	Unrevealed	Unrevealed	900,000
Siano	Unrevealed	Unrevealed	Unrevealed	Unrevealed	800,000
Choi LB	Unrevealed	Unrevealed	Unrevealed	Unrevealed	800,000
Bully Da Ba$tard	100,000	300,000	300,000	FAIL	700,000
Young Jay	Unrevealed	Unrevealed	Unrevealed	Unrevealed	800,000
Simba Zawadi	FAIL	Unrevealed	FAIL	Unrevealed	600,000
Choi Seo-hyun (Dooyoung)	Unrevealed	FAIL	FAIL	Unrevealed	600,000
Logan	Unrevealed	Unrevealed	Unrevealed	Unrevealed	500,000
Jo Won-woo (H2ADIN)	Unrevealed	Unrevealed	Unrevealed	FAIL	400,000
Osshun Gum	FAIL	300,000	FAIL	100,000	400,000
Lil Tachi	Unrevealed	Unrevealed	Unrevealed	Unrevealed	400,000
JJK	Unrevealed	Unrevealed	Unrevealed	Unrevealed	300,000
New Champ	FAIL	300,000	FAIL	FAIL	300,000
Maniac	Unrevealed	Unrevealed	Unrevealed	Unrevealed	300,000
Errday	Unrevealed	Unrevealed	Unrevealed	Unrevealed	300,000
Walter	Unrevealed	Unrevealed	Unrevealed	Unrevealed	300,000
FeveR	Unrevealed	Unrevealed	Unrevealed	Unrevealed	300,000
Kim Seung-min	Unrevealed	Unrevealed	Unrevealed	Unrevealed	200,000
DOX-A	Unrevealed	Unrevealed	Unrevealed	Unrevealed	200,000
Black Nine	FAIL	200,000	FAIL	FAIL	200,000
Kidd King	Unrevealed	Unrevealed	Unrevealed	Unrevealed	200,000
Dayday	Unrevealed	Unrevealed	Unrevealed	Unrevealed	100,000
Dbo	FAIL	FAIL	FAIL	100,000	100,000
Louie	Unrevealed	Unrevealed	Unrevealed	Unrevealed	100,000
Park Dan	FAIL	FAIL	FAIL	100,000	100,000
Swervy	Unrevealed	Unrevealed	Unrevealed	Unrevealed	100,000
A-Chess	Unrevealed	Unrevealed	Unrevealed	Unrevealed	100,000
Lee Dong-min	100,000	FAIL	FAIL	FAIL	100,000
Mommy Son	FAIL	FAIL	FAIL	FAIL	FAIL
Ness	FAIL	FAIL	FAIL	FAIL	FAIL
Chin Chilla	FAIL	FAIL	FAIL	FAIL	FAIL

PASSED by the Producer Team
FAILED by the Producer Team

- Round Three: Fight Money Battle Round + Revival Round – The bets each rapper received from Round Two has been carried forward to this round. Different from the 1-on-1 Rap Battles that have been used in previous seasons, for this round, there can be a triple battle. MC Kim Jin-pyo will randomly pick a card with a rapper's name, and contestants that want to battle against this picked rapper can step forward to ask for a battle. The picked rapper will then pick one of the rappers for a 1-on-1 rap battle. A triple battle is established if a picked rapper picks two of the rapper challengers, or when one rapper wants to go up and join an already set 1-on-1 rap battle. The winner of each triple battle will take all the money of the two other rappers in each triple battle, and the latter two will also be eliminated from the show. In the event of a tie, a sudden death 1-on-1 match will be held to determine the winner. Selected rappers that were eliminated in this round will participate in the 1-on-1 revival round, where the winner of each 1-on-1 battle will advance to the next round, the Group Battle. The winner of each Revival Round battle will receive 100,000 won as Fight Money.

Rapper #1	Result	Rapper #2	Result	Rapper #3	Result	Total Fight Money Accumulated (Note: Taken by the winner of each triple battle)
D.Ark	Passed	Owen Ovadoz	Eliminated	Choi Eun-seo	Eliminated	12,600,000
Chillin Homie	Eliminated	Osshun Gum	Eliminated	New Champ	Passed	3,600,000
Keem Hyo-eun	Passed	Pento	Eliminated	Reddy	Eliminated	10,300,00
24 Flakko	Eliminated	DOX-A	Eliminated	Lee Su-rin	Passed	4,300,000
Black Nine	Passed	Errday	Eliminated	Walter	Eliminated	800,000
Seo Il-gyo	Passed	Ryno	Eliminated	Logan	Eliminated	5,000,000
JJK	Eliminated	Jo Won-woo (H2ADIN)	Eliminated	Choi LB	Passed	1,300,000
Changstarr	Eliminated	Boo Hyun-seok	Passed	Simba Zawadi	Eliminated	5,100,000
Swervy	Eliminated	Park Dan	Eliminated	Lee Dong-min	Passed	300,000
Lil Tachi	Eliminated	Coogie	Passed	Zene The Zilla	Eliminated	10,300,000
Snacky Chan	Eliminated	Dbo	Eliminated	YunB	Passed (via sudden death against Dbo)	5,000,000
pH-1	Eliminated	Kidd King	Eliminated	Kid Milli	Passed	12,400,000
POY Muzeum	Eliminated	Loopy	Passed	NO:EL	Eliminated	9,700,000
Dayday	Eliminated	Superbee	Passed (via sudden death against Chaboom)	Chaboom	Eliminated	16,400,000
Nafla	Passed	EK	Eliminated	Bully Da Ba$tard	Eliminated	27,000,000
Los	Passed	Damndef	Eliminated	FeveR	Eliminated	6,700,000
Slick O'domar	Passed	Choi Seo-hyun (Dooyoung)	Eliminated	A-Chess	Eliminated	2,300,000
ODEE	Passed	Siano	Eliminated	Mac9	Eliminated	5,300,000
OLNL	Passed	Young Jay	Eliminated	Rakon	Eliminated	3,600,000
Qwala	Passed	Kim Seung-min	Eliminated	Louie	Eliminated	1,400,000

Revival Round
Dbo	vs.	Zene The Zilla
pH-1	vs.	Reddy
Bully Da Ba$tard	vs.	Chaboom
NO:EL	vs.	EK

Indicates the winner.

- Round Four: Group Battle – The remaining 24 contestants after Round Three will be split into two teams: Team Nafla and Team Superbee, named after the two rappers that currently have the most Fight Money accumulated. Each group will take turns as they do freestyle/pre-rehearsed raps under certain beats. The winning group will advance to the Team Choosing Round, with the group receiving 50,000,000 won that is to be equally distributed. In the case of a tie after two rounds, a third round will be held to determine the winning group. All groups will advance in the team choosing round.

Round 1
Song	Team Nafla	vs.	Team Superbee	Winning team
THEY. - U-Rite	ODEE	vs.	Superbee	Team Nafla
The Notorious B.I.G. - Juicy	Nafla	vs.	OLNL	Team Nafla
Rae Sremmurd (ft. Juicy J) - Powerglide	Lee Su-rin	vs.	Los	Team Nafla
Dilated Peoples (ft. Guru) - Worst Comes to Worst	Slick O'domar	vs.	Qwala	Team Nafla
Pusha T - Numbers on the Boards	New Champ	vs.	Kid Milli	Team Nafla
XXXTentacion: Look at Me	Coogie	vs.	Lee Dong-min	Team Nafla

Round 2
Song	Team Nafla	vs.	Team Superbee	Winning team
Lil Dicky (ft. Chris Brown): Freaky Friday	EK	vs.	pH-1	Team Superbee
2Pac: All Eyez on me	Loopy	vs.	Keem Hyo-eun	Team Superbee
Kendrick Lamar (ft. Travis Scott) - Big Shot	YunB	vs.	Choi LB	Team Superbee
A Tribe Called Quest - Award Tour	Seo Il-gyo	vs.	Chaboom	Team Superbee
Big Shaq - Man's Not Hot	Zene The Zilla	vs.	D.Ark	Team Superbee
Eric B. & Rakim - Juice (Know the Ledge)	Boo Hyun-seok	vs.	Black Nine	Team Superbee

Round 3
Song	Team Nafla	vs.	Team Superbee	Winning team
The Diplomats (ft. Cam'Ron & Juelz Santana) - Dipset Anthem	YunB	vs.	Choi LB	Team Nafla
Nicki Minaj - Chun-Li	Slick O'Domar	vs.	Los	Team Nafla
Rae Sremmurd - Black Beatles	Loopy	vs.	Kid Milli	Team Nafla
Jay Rock, Kendrick Lamar, Future & James Blake - King's Dead	Coogie	vs.	pH-1	Team Nafla
Pras (ft. Mýa) - Ghetto Superstar	Nafla	vs.	Qwala	Team Nafla
The Notorious B.I.G. - One More Chance (Hip-Hop Remix)	ODEE	vs.	Superbee	Team Nafla

- Round Five: Producers Stages/Team Choosing – Producers will have live performances to determine which team will get the first pick. The remaining contestants will vote which producer team had the best performance. In the Team Choosing segment, each contestant ranked from the least Fight Money earned to the most Fight Money earned will choose which producer team he will join. The chosen producer team will make a choice whether to accept him or not. All producer teams will show their bet money before the contestant makes his decision. A total of four contestants per producer team will be set. If there are more than four members in the team, the latest contestant picked by that producer team will choose which contestant he will replace in the team, causing the replaced contestant to be eliminated from the show. The remaining contestants not selected by any team will also be eliminated.

Ranking of Producers Stages

Rank	Producer Team	Songs Performed	Money Received
1st	Team Illionaire Ambition	Maestro, Prime Time, Bentley, THE 1LLEST (feat. Jessi), Inkigayo	20,000,000 won
2nd	Team VMC	Nuckle Flow, VICE MAKES CASH, Big Brother (feat. Don Mills), What You Want is the Price (feat. Don Mills), Jakdu	15,000,000 won
3rd	Team Hi-Lite AOMG	Don't shoot me MAMA (feat. Car, the Garden), Line 3 Maebong Station (Code Kunst Remix), Piña Colada, Next One, Wayne (feat. G2), Turtle Ship Remix (feat. G2)	7,000,000 won
3rd	Team Just Music	Empty House (Prod. by dnss) (feat. THAMA), acrnm, Master Mind (Prod. by Squabby Doo), 2007, Rain Showers Remix, wewantourmoneyback (Prod. by Lemac)	7,000,000 won

List of advancing rappers and eliminated rappers after Team Choosing (Note: After the Group Battle, it is announced that Team Nafla has won but there will be no elimination for Team Superbee. Hence, the 24 contestants will move on to watch the producers' stages and then take part in the Team Choosing segment.)

Team Nafla	Team Superbee
ODEE	Superbee
Nafla	OLNL
Lee Su-rin (Note: Originally picked by Team Illionaire Ambition but was then replaced, hence eliminated.)	Los
Slick O'domar	Qwala
New Champ (Note: Originally picked by Team Hi-Lite & AOMG but was then replaced, hence eliminated.)	Kid Milli
Coogie	Lee Dong-min
EK	pH-1
Loopy	Keem Hyo-eun
YunB	Choi LB (Note: Originally picked by Team VMC but was then replaced, hence eliminated.)
Seo Il-gyo	Chaboom
Zene The Zilla	D.Ark
Boo Hyun-seok	Black Nine

Color key

- Team Just Music
- Team VMC
- Team Hi-Lite AOMG
- Team Illionaire Ambition
- Eliminated from the show

Total accumulated Fight Money for each team

Producer Team	Rappers Chosen	Total Money Accumulated
Team Just Music	Nafla, ODEE, OLNL, YunB	58,800,000 won
Team VMC	Keem Hyo-eun, EK, Los, Chaboom	38,200,000 won
Team Hi-Lite AOMG	Kid Milli, Loopy, Qwala, pH-1	36,400,000 won
Team Illionaire Ambition	Superbee, Coogie, D.Ark, Lee Dong-min	63,600,000 won

- Round Six: Team Song Mission – All producer teams travel to Hong Kong for their team bonding and Team Song Mission preparations. Just like in the previous seasons, each producer team performs in front of all the judges, and the judges will eliminate one contestant from their own team at the end of each performance.

Team	Rappers	Song	Eliminated Rapper
Illionaire Ambition	Superbee, Lee Dong-min, Coogie, D.Ark	"SaimSaim" (사임사임)	Lee Dong-min
Just Music	ODEE, Nafla, YunB, OLNL	"Science Fiction Technology" (공상과학기술)	YunB
VMC	Chaboom, Los, EK, Keem Hyo-eun	"PAE" (패)	Los
Hi-Lite AOMG	pH-1, Kid Milli, Qwala, Loopy	Good Day	Qwala

- Round Seven: Team Diss Battle – Producers from opposing teams play rock, paper, scissors to determine the teams that get to choose their opponents for this round. Three 1-vs-1 diss battles will be held for each round. Each of the teams' judges will place Fight Money bets on their own teams (only 1 million, 3 million, 5 million, 7 million and 10 million won bets are allowed and can only choose 1 value). The winning team will receive twice the bet amount they have put, while the losing team will lose the bet amount they have put.

Team Just Music vs. Team VMC
Team Just Music	vs.	Team VMC
Nafla	vs.	Chaboom
ODEE	vs.	Keem Hyo-eun
OLNL	vs.	EK

Team Hi-Lite AOMG vs. Team Illionaire-Ambition
Team Hi-Lite AOMG	vs.	Team Illionaire Ambition
pH-1	vs.	D.Ark
Kid Milli	vs.	Coogie
Loopy	vs.	Superbee

Indicates the winning team.
Indicates the winning contestant/s.

Money distribution to each contestant after Team Diss Battle

Team Just Music		Team VMC		Team Hi-Lite AOMG		Team Illionaire Ambition	
Nafla	41,200,000 won	EK	31,200,000 won	Loopy	30,000,000 won	Superbee	21,200,000 won
ODEE	12,000,000 won	Chaboom	5,000,000 won	Kid Milli	3,200,000 won	Coogie	21,200,000 won
OLNL	2,600,000 won	Keem Hyo-eun	5,000,000 won	pH-1	3,200,000 won	D.Ark	21,200,000 won

- Round Eight: 1st Live Performances - Following the results of the team diss battles, winning teams will have their contestants choose their opponents in order of money distributed before this round. Contestants have live performances with the producer/s and/or with featuring(s) of other artist(s). Based on the combined number of live audience votes after two rounds of voting, the winner of each battle advances to the next round and gets all of his opponent's money while the loser gets eliminated. In the event that all contestants in one team lose against their individual opponents after this round, their entire team will be eliminated from the show.

Live Performances			Total Money Accumulated (Note: Taken by the winner of each battle)	Eliminated Rapper	Total Live Audience Votes (Note: Combination of two rounds of voting)
D.Ark (ft. The Quiett): "Trap Middle School Kid" (트랩중딩)	vs.	pH-1 (ft. Woo Won-jae): "Hate You"	24,400,000 won	D.Ark	350-389
OLNL (ft. Giriboy): "Breaking Bad" (브레이킹배드)	vs.	Coogie (ft. Sik-K): "Damn Fate" (빌어먹을 인연)	23,800,000 won	Coogie	388-361
Keem Hyo-eun (ft. Deepflow, Dok2): "XXL" + "Wattup" (Note: Song from Dok2's album "Reborn" which featured Keem Hyo-eun)	vs.	Nafla: "Bite" (물어) (Note: Contains sample vocals from Zion T's song "Madame")	46,200,000 won	Keem Hyo-eun	354-406
Chaboom (ft. Sunwoo Jung-a, Nucksal): "When The Time Comes" (죽어도 좋아)	vs.	Loopy (ft. Paloalto): "Save"	35,000,000 won	Chaboom	116-636
Superbee (ft. Changmo): "Selfmade Orange" (Note: Song from Changmo's album "Reached Moment" which featured Superbee) + "Hundred Million" (억)	vs.	ODEE (ft. Swings): "Airplane Mode" (에어플레인모드)	33,200,000 won	ODEE	397-363
Kid Milli (ft. GRAY): "Change"	vs.	EK: "GOD GOD GOD" (Note: The live performance features dance performances from his crew Most Badass Asian (M.B.A) and BIGONE)	34,400,000 won	EK	424-327

Indicates the winning performance.

Total Team Fight Money accumulated after the 1st Live Performance Round

Producer Team	Rappers Remaining	Total Money Accumulated
Team Hi-Lite AOMG	Loopy, Kid Milli, pH-1	93,800,000 won
Team Just Music	Nafla, OLNL	70,000,000 won
Team Illionaire Ambition	Superbee	33,200,000 won
Team VMC	None	0,000,000 won

Entire team was eliminated from the show after none of its contestants advanced to the semifinal round.

- Round Nine: Top 6 Special Performance + Semi-final Performances - The Top 6 contestants will open up the semi-final round with a special stage performance together, with the song produced by GRAY, to honor the judge producers and members of Team VMC, who were all eliminated after none of the team's contestants advanced to the Top 6. The top two contestants that received the most money from the previous round gets to choose their individual opponents for this round. The remaining six contestants will each have a solo performance with a guest performer(s). The contestant who received more combined number of live audience votes after two rounds of voting against their match-up advances to the finals and gets all of his opponent's money while the loser gets eliminated.

Song	Show Me The Money 777 Top 6 Contestants
"119" (Prod. by GRAY)	Nafla, pH-1, Kid Milli, OLNL, Loopy, Superbee

Live Performances			Total Money Accumulated	Eliminated Rapper	Total Live Audience Votes
Kid Milli (ft. Justhis) - "MOMM"	vs.	OLNL (ft. Samuel Seo) - "i"	42,000,000 won	OLNL	632-153
Superbee (ft. BewhY) - "SUPERBEEwhY" (수퍼비와)	vs.	Loopy (ft. Simon Dominic) - "Winning" + "NoNo"	47,000,000 won	Superbee	389-394
pH-1 (ft. Jay Park) - "Orange" (주황색)	vs.	Nafla (ft. Gaeko) - "Wu" (Note: Nafla's single from 2015) + "SUNBBANG"	108,000,000 won	pH-1	244-534

Indicates the winning performance.

Total Team Fight Money accumulated after the Semifinal Round

Producer Team	Rappers Remaining	Total Money Accumulated
Team Just Music	Nafla	108,000,000 won
Team Hi-Lite AOMG	Kid Milli, Loopy	89,000,000 won
Team Illionaire Ambition	None	0,000,000 won

Entire team was eliminated from the show after none of its contestants advanced to the final round.

- Final Round: Final + Special Performances (Live Episode) – The final round is televised live with votes from both the TV viewers and the live audience. For the first time in Show Me the Money's history, at least two contestants from the same team are in the final round, with Team Hi-Lite AOMG's Loopy and Kid Milli progressing from the Semi-final Performances Round. In the first part of the finals, all three remaining finalists will perform live on stage alone and/or a special guest performer(s). In the second part of the finals, they will each have one last performance with the producer(s) and with a special guest performer(s). The contestant who earned the most votes will be this season's champion and receive the final prize money of 200,000,000 won. The live episode included a special debut stage from Mommy Son, the pink masked rapper which was revealed to be Mad Clown, whose shocking elimination earlier this season caused the sudden rise in his popularity. The performance featured Bae Ki-sung and season 5 contestant Donutman, who is the rapper Mommy Son apologized to in his song for not giving the mic during the mic selection back in season 5. A special collaboration stage by EK, ODEE, Zene The Zilla and Coogie is included in the live episode.

Finals (Part 1) Results
Team	Live Performance	1st Round Fight Money	1st Round Final Ranking
Team Hi-Lite AOMG	Kid Milli (ft. Young B) - "WHY DO FUCKBOIS HANGOUT ON THE NET" (Note: Title track of Kid Milli's 2018 full album "AI, THE PLAYLIST") + "Boss thang"	32,560,000 won	2nd
Team Hi-Lite AOMG	Loopy - "Robot Love" (Note: Includes live production from Code Kunst)	25,380,000 won	3rd
Team Just Music	Nafla (ft. Zico) - "Buckle" (버클)	40,900,000 won	1st

Finals (Part 2) Results
Team	Live Performance	Total Final Fight Money (Note: Combination of Part 1 and Part 2 votes from both the live audience and TV viewers)
Team Hi-Lite AOMG	Kid Milli (ft. Paloalto and Hoody) - "Goals"	56,440,000 won
Team Hi-Lite AOMG	Loopy (ft. Loco) - "V"	69,690,000 won
Team Just Music	Nafla (ft. Swings and Giriboy) - "Pickup Man" (픽업맨)	70,750,000 won

Indicates winner of Show Me The Money 777.
Indicates 1st runner-up of Show Me The Money 777.
Indicates 2nd runner-up of Show Me The Money 777.

== Show Me The Money 777 Top 16 ==
Contestant	Team	1	2	3	4	5	6	7	8	9
Nafla	Just Music	PASS	ALL PASS	PASS	WON	PASS	WON	PASS	PASS	WINNER
Loopy	Hi-Lite AOMG	PASS	ALL PASS	PASS	WON	PASS	WON	PASS	PASS	Runner-up
Kid Milli	Hi-Lite AOMG	PASS	3 PASS	PASS	LOST	PASS	LOST	PASS	PASS	3rd place
Superbee	Illionaire Ambition	PASS	ALL-PASS	PASS	LOST	PASS	LOST	PASS	ELIM	
pH-1	Hi-Lite AOMG	PASS	ALL-PASS	REVIVED	LOST	PASS	LOST	PASS	ELIM	
OLNL	Just Music	PASS	UNREVEALED	PASS	LOST	PASS	WON	PASS	ELIM	
ODEE	Just Music	PASS	2 PASS	PASS	WON	PASS	WON	ELIM		
EK	VMC	PASS	ALL-PASS	REVIVED	WON	PASS	LOST	ELIM		
Keem Hyo-eun	VMC	PASS	3 PASS	PASS	LOST	PASS	LOST	ELIM		
Chaboom	VMC	PASS	ALL PASS	REVIVED	LOST	PASS	LOST	ELIM		
Coogie	Illionaire Ambition	PASS	ALL-PASS	PASS	WON	PASS	WON	ELIM		
D.Ark	Illionaire Ambition	PASS	ALL-PASS	PASS	LOST	PASS	WON	ELIM		
YunB	Just Music	PASS	3 PASS	PASS	WON	ELIM				
Los	VMC	PASS	ALL-PASS	PASS	LOST	ELIM				
Qwala	Hi-Lite AOMG	PASS	3 PASS	PASS	LOST	ELIM				
Lee Dong-min	Illionaire Ambition	PASS	1 PASS	PASS	LOST	ELIM				

WINNER The contestant won Show Me the Money 777.
Runner-Up The contestant was the runner-up.
3rd place The contestant was the 3rd place.
ALL-PASS The contestant received an All-Pass during the second round.
3 PASS The contestant received one fail during the second round.
2 PASS The contestant received two fails during the second round.
1 PASS The contestant only received one pass during the second round.
UNREVEALED The contestant's pass/fail scores were not revealed but passed the second round.
ELIM The contestant was eliminated.
WON The contestant's team won during the Group Battle Round
WON The contestant's team won during the diss battle round.
The contestant did not participate in this round.

== Notable contestants ==
- Mommy Son : The pink-masked Korean rapper which was later revealed to be former season 2 contestant and season 5 judge Mad Clown. After passing the Rapper Selection round, fellow contestants, notably Snacky Chan and Pento, questioned Mommy Son's real identity, in which he later revealed his true identity to them. After the show's first episode, netizens posted comments on Mad Clown's Instagram page stating that Mad Clown was indeed Mommy Son, in which he quickly shut down the rumors that he's not the man behind Mommy Son and instead gave Mommy Son's actual Instagram account. In the Rapper Open Evaluation Round, the judges, notably Swings, asked him to remove the mask, knowing that it was Mad Clown all along. However, he refused to do so, stating that the mask is an artistic tool for him to fully express himself as an artist and the Mommy Son character is solely for his joy regardless of whether they found out his true identity. Unfortunately, Mommy Son was eliminated after forgetting his lyrics. Following his elimination from the show, he released a hilarious diss rap "Shonen Jump", dissing the judges from the show and expressing his strong desires to get back up. His popularity grew, which resulted in multiple magazine and television appearances, and fans wearing pink masks and gloves to imitate him.
- Onesun : First generation Korean hip-hop artist who previously auditioned in season 5 and season 6, where he was known for his famous phrase "Let Me Do it Again" after failing the latter season's preliminary round. He returned this season but failed to pass the Rapper Selection round.
- Owen Ovadoz : Rapper and member of the crew/record company MKIT RAIN alongside fellow contestants Nafla and Loopy. Previously participated in seasons 3 and 4. Eliminated in the Fight Money Battle Round.
- Choi Eun-seo : 15 year old rapper who is a member of AS Clan. Eliminated in the Fight Money Battle Round.
- Snacky Chan : Rapper under Dynasty Muzik. Previously participated in season 3 as a member of Team YG and in seasons four and five. Eliminated in the Fight Money Battle Round.
- Osshun Gum : Rapper under Just Music and first runner-up of the first season of High School Rapper. Eliminated in the Fight Money Battle Round.
- Reddy : Rapper under Hi-Lite Records. Previously participated in season 5 as a member of Team YG. Eliminated in the Revival Round.
- Maniac : Korean-American veteran rapper under his own label, PayDay Entertainment. Previously a member of Jiggy Fellaz, Dynasty Family, New Dynasty and Uptown crews. Also known as "1-Shot" and "OG" with Uptown. Previously participated in season 6 as a member of Team Feel Ghood Music. Originally passed the Rapper Open Evaluation Round with 300,000 won, he was not seen in the Fight Money Battle Round. There is a possibility that he has voluntarily left the show, reasons unknown.
- Ness : Korean-American rapper currently signed under iiA, also known by the moniker 'Noctunes'. Previously participated in season 6 as a member of Team H1GHR MUSIC. Eliminated in the Rapper Open Evaluation Round.
- Ryno : Member of the hip-hop collective crew New Area Aliens. Previously participated in season 6 as a member of Team Dynamic Duo. Eliminated in the Fight Money Battle Round.
- Simba Zawadi : Rapper under Luminant Entertainment. Previously auditioned in season 6. Prior to this season, he had a three-year feud between him, judge/producer Paloalto and his record label Hi-Lite Records. However, Paloalto extended his hand to Simba Zawadi and congratulated him after passing the Rapper Open Evaluation Round, marking the end of their long-standing feud. Eliminated in the Fight Money Battle Round.
- Swervy : The only female rapper this season to advance further to the Fight Money Battle Round. Member of Team YAYA crew. Eliminated in the Fight Money Battle Round. She became the first female artist to sign with Hi-Lite Records after the show ended.
- Jo Woo-jin : Rapper who previously participated in season 2. He dissed judge/producer Swings, who was also a participant in season 2, through a track titled "Switch" in 2017. At the Rapper Selection Round, he volunteered to be judged by Swings. Swings was upset upon seeing him due to this issue, but then passed him after his rap, saying that he has improved his rapping skills. He was eliminated in the Rapper Open Evaluation Round.
- Louie : Eliminated in the Fight Money Battle Round.
- Dayday : Former member of Dalmatian. Known by his real name David Kim. Previously participated in season 4 and season 5 both as a member of Team AOMG. Eliminated in the Fight Money Battle Round.
- NO:EL : Rapper under Indigo Music, the sub-label of Just Music, and part of the COZYBOYS crew alongside fellow contestant Kid Milli. Known by his real name Jang Yong-joon. Previously participated in season 6 and dropped out of the first season of High School Rapper due to prostitution and bullying controversies. Eliminated in the Revival Round.
- H2ADIN : Second runner-up and fourth-runner up of the first and second season of High School Rapper respectively. Known by his real name Jo Won-woo. Eliminated in the Fight Money Battle Round.
- JJK : Veteran freestyle rapper and Leader of the Angdreville Crew (ADV). Previously participated in season 6. Eliminated in the Fight Money Battle Round.
- Bully Da Ba$tard : Ex-member of DICKIDS crew. Previously auditioned for season 6 but was disqualified after posting on social media that he passed that season's preliminary round before that season started its broadcast. He also was a contestant on the first and second season of High School Rapper having both Swings and Deepflow as mentors. Eliminated in the Revival Round.
- Changstarr : Korean-American rapper who has a great appreciation to the hippie culture. He assisted in providing English translations of Swings' Just Music label music tracks and also made a cameo on Lil Uzi Vert's P's and Q's music video. During the Fight Money Battle Round, he made a comment on the show's female DJ Vani "She's really hot though" prior to the start of the performance. However, he suddenly forgot his lyrics, causing him to be eliminated. Judge/producer Swings commented that saying such comments will obviously cause him to forget his lyrics, while judges/producers The Quiett and Code Kunst stated that he should not have auditioned for the show if he is not serious enough to compete. At the end of the show, Changstarr explained through his Instagram account that he made the comment on the DJ in an attempt to lighten up the mood of the judges/producers and the remaining contestants due to the very long and exhausting recording schedule for that round. Furthermore, he clarified that he was not nervous at that time but was very exhausted, causing him to forget his lyrics.
- New Champ : Previously participated in season 4 where he was a member of Team YG, and auditioned in seasons 3 and 6. Signed under FAME Records' sub-label Urbane Music. Eliminated after the Team Choosing Round despite being chosen by Team Hi-Lite & AOMG, after Loopy replaced him from the team.
- Boo Hyun-seok : Previously participated in season 3 as a member of Team Brand New Music. Also known by his rapper name SNAP OUT. Eliminated after the Team Choosing Round despite being chosen by Team Illionaire Ambition, after Superbee replaced him from the team.
- Black Nine : Known for his hardcore rap style. Previously participated in season 6 as a member of Team Feel GHood Music where he eventually signed to their label company two months after that season ended. Eliminated after the Team Choosing Round despite being chosen by Team VMC, after EK replaced him from the team.
- Lee Su-rin : Rapper and ex-leader of Dickids crew and member of XXYXNAF crew. Signed under FAME Records. Previously participated in season 5 and the first season of High School Rapper. Also known by his rap names LUDA, TRAPSTARSUREEN, UNOFFICIALBOYY, and Baddie Homie. Eliminated after the Team Choosing Round despite being chosen by Team Illionaire Ambition, after Coogie replaced him from the team.
- Zene the Zilla : Member of Young Thugs Club (YTC). Eliminated after the Team Choosing Round despite being chosen by Team VMC, after Los replaced him from the team. He signed with Ambition Musik in 2019.
- Sway D : Rapper and producer under Hi-Lite Records. Eliminated in the Rapper Open Evaluation Round.

== Controversies ==
D.Ark was involved in a controversy, which explained that a 20-year-old woman, who claimed to be his ex-girlfriend, posted on social media that he had an intimate relationship with her, and alleged he made her engage in "forced relations" during their relationship. After this controversy blew up, D.Ark posted a public apology through his personal Instagram, and stated that "he did meet with the female who made the allegation". He also mentioned that the two have cleared up the misunderstanding. Regarding this controversy, Mnet have released an official statement that they will only air footage of D.Ark that is necessary to properly convey the efforts of the other contestants and the judges, instead of completely editing him out. His song for the 1st Live Performances, titled "Trap Middle School Kid", was not released on various music sites, and his performance of the song on the show was also not uploaded on the official Mnet channel.
