= Tribe of Hip Hop =

South Korean television series

- Promotional poster
- Genre: Music
- Presented by: Shin Dong-yup; San E
- Country of origin: South Korea
- Original language: Korean
- No. of seasons: 1–2

Production
- Production location: South Korea
- Running time: 90 minutes

Original release
- Network: JTBC
- Release: April 1, 2016 – present

Tribe of Hip Hop (Korean: 힙합의 민족) is a 2016 South Korean music show presented by Shin Dong-yup and San E. It airs on JTBC on Fridays at 21:40 (KST).

== Format ==
It is a show where all 50 contestants must not be professional or underground rappers, or act as a main rapper (but can be lead rapper) of a group, but can be well-known singers, actors, models and TV personalities.

In the recruitment challenge, contestant can choose to write part of their lyrics based on a popular rap track, and unlike The Voice, the contestants' identity will be revealed after the first part of the performance. If more than one 'house' want accepted the contestants, each house will use diamonds (as in the idiom 'diamond in the rough' ) to bid on the contestants, but if the house run out of diamonds each episode, they can only pick members that were unopposed. In the 1-on-1 challenge, two rappers go head-to-head to a track with adjusted lyrics by their mentor, but contestants can perform with their own lyrics. While contestants can intimidate each other, it is not a diss battle.

The winner, along with their producers, will each win a 1-carat diamond ring.

== Cast ==
=== Presenter ===
- Shin Dong-yup
- San E

== Season 1 ==
=== Producer ===
- MC Sniper
- P-Type
- Cheetah
- KittiB
- Lil Boi
- DinDin
- Hanhae
- Jooheon

=== Hidden Card ===
- Sleepy
- Basick
- Mino

=== Participants ===
- Kim Young-ok
- Yeom Jung-in
- Yang Hee-kyung
- Choi Byung-joo
- Lee Yong-nyeo
- Lee Gyung-jin
- Kim Young-im
- Moon Hee-kyung

== Season 2. Hip Hop Tribe 2: Game of Thrones ==
=== Producer ===
| Brand New House | Hi-Lite House | Hot Chicks House | SESESE House | Swish House |
|---|---|---|---|---|
| P-type; Minos; Hanhae | Paloalto; Reddy; G2 | Cheetah; LE; Yezi | MC Sniper; DinDin; Jooheon | Joo-suk; Basick; Microdot |

=== Participants ===
| No. | Contestant | Team | Mission 1: Recruit Battle | | | | |
|---|---|---|---|---|---|---|---|
| No. | Contestant | Team | Episode 1 | Episode 2 | Episode 3 | Episode 4 | Episode 5 |
| 1 | Lee Young-yoo | SESESE House | PASS | | | | |
| 2 | Maeng Ki-yong | — | ELIM | | | | |
| 3 | Dana | Hot Chicks House | PASS | | | | |
| 4 | Jang Ki-yong | Hot Chicks House | PASS | | | | |
| 5 | Song Jae-hee | — | ELIM | | | | |
| 6 | Kang Sung-mi | — | ELIM | | | | |
| 7 | Park Kwang-sun | Brand New House | PASS | | | | |
| 8 | Kim Joon | SESESE House | | PASS | | | |
| 9 | Yang Mi-ra | Brand New House | | PASS | | | |
| 10 | Jeong Won-yeong | SESESE House | | PASS | | | |
| 11 | Eunjin | Swish House | | PASS | | | |
| 12 | Kang Seung-hyun | Brand New House | | PASS | | | |
| 13 | Charles | Swish House | | | PASS | | |
| 14 | Choi Sung-joon | Hot Chicks House | | | PASS | | |
| 15 | Joo Woo-jae | Hi-Lite House | | | PASS | | |
| 16 | NC.A | Hi-Lite House | | | PASS | | |
| 17 | Mina | — | | | ELIM | | |
| 18 | Kil Gun | — | | | ELIM | | |
| 19 | Moon Hee-kyung | Swish House | | | PASS | | |
| 20 | Oh Hyun-min | Hot Chicks House | | | PASS | | |
| 21 | Hong Jin-ho | — | | | ELIM | | |
| 22 | Jay | Swish House | | | | PASS | |
| 23 | Han Suk-joon | — | | | | ELIM | |
| 24 | Jung Kyung-ho | — | | | | ELIM | |
| 25 | Kang Min-ah | Hi-Lite House | | | | PASS | |
| 26 | Kim Min-kyung | — | | | | ELIM | |
| 27 | Song Hae-na | — | | | | ELIM | |
| 28 | Kwon Hyun-sang | — | | | | ELIM | |
| 29 | Moon Kyu-pak | — | | | | ELIM | |
| 30 | Michelle Lee | SESESE House | | | | PASS | |
| 31 | Seo Yu-ri | — | | | | ELIM | |
| 32 | Changjo | Swish House | | | | PASS | |
| 33 | Yoon Jung-jae | — | | | | | ELIM |
| 34 | Kang Eun-bi | — | | | | | ELIM |
| 35 | Kong Seo-young | — | | | | | ELIM |
| 36 | No Min-hyuk | — | | | | | ELIM |
| 37 | Kim Kiri | Brand New House | | | | | PASS |
| 38 | Chang Sung-hwan | Hot Chicks House | | | | | PASS |
| 39 | Oh Jae-moo | — | | | | | ELIM |
| 40 | Park Joon-myun | Brand New House | | | | | PASS |
| 41 | Boa | SESESE House | | | | | PASS |
| 42 | Song Jae-yun | — | | | | | ELIM |
| 43 | Lee Yi-kyung | Hi-Lite House | | | | | PASS |

ELIM The contestant was eliminated.

=== Special Guests ===
- Kev Nish&Prohgress

=== Mission ===
| Mission I 1:1 Rap Battle | Episode | Contestant 1 | | Contestant 2 | |
|---|---|---|---|---|---|
| Mission I 1:1 Rap Battle | 6 | N.CA (Hi-Lite) | Win | ELIM | Lee Young-yoo (SeSeSe) |
| Mission I 1:1 Rap Battle | 6 | Chang Sung-hwan (Hot Chicks) | Win | ELIM | Charles (Swish) |
| Mission I 1:1 Rap Battle | 6 | Park Kwang-sun (Brand New) | Win | ELIM | Jay (Swish) |
| Mission I 1:1 Rap Battle | 6 | Kim Kiri (Brand New) | Win | ELIM | Kim Joon (SeSeSe) |
| Mission I 1:1 Rap Battle | 7 | Moon Hee-kyung (Siwsh) | Win | ELIM | Dana (Hot Chicks) |
| Mission I 1:1 Rap Battle | 7 | Choi Sung-joon (Hot Chicks) | Win | ELIM | Jung Won-young (SeSeSe) |
| Mission I 1:1 Rap Battle | 7 | Boa (SeSeSe) | Win | ELIM | Eunjin (Swish) |
| Mission I 1:1 Rap Battle | 7 | Michelle Lee (SeSeSe) | Win | Win | Jang Ki-yong (Hot Chicks) |
| Mission I 1:1 Rap Battle | 8 | Changjo (Swish) | Win | ELIM | Oh Hyun-min (Hot Chicks) |
| Mission I 1:1 Rap Battle | 8 | Joo Woo-jae (Hi-Lite) | ELIM | Win | Yang Mi-ra (Brand New) |
| Mission I 1:1 Rap Battle | 8 | Park Joon-myun (Brand New) | Win | ELIM | Lee Yi-kyung (Hi-Lite) |
| Mission I 1:1 Rap Battle | 8 | Kang Seung-hyun (Brand New) | Win | ELIM | Kang Min-ah (Hi-Lite) |

| Mission II | Round | Episode | House/Group | Contestant/s | Candidate for Elimination | Notes |
|---|---|---|---|---|---|---|
| Mission II | Round 1: A game to kill | 9 | SeSeSe | Boa Michelle Lee | Michelle Lee | Michelle Lee got saved in the second round. SeSeSe got placed as 1. place by Far East Movement and won an advantage. |
| Mission II | Round 1: A game to kill | 9 | Brand New | Kang Seung-hyun Yang Mi-ra | Yang Mi-ra | Yang Mi-ra got saved in the second round. |
| Mission II | Round 1: A game to kill | 10 | Swish | Moon Hee-kyung Changjo | Moon Hee-kyung | Moon Hee-kyung got saved in the second round. |
| Mission II | Round 1: A game to kill | 10 | Hi-Lite | N.CA Lee Yi-kyung | Lee Yi-kyung | Lee Yi-kyung got eliminated in the second round. |
| Mission II | Round 1: A game to kill | 10 | Hot Chicks | Choi Sung-joon Jang Sung-hwan | Choi Sung-joon | Choi Sung-joon got eliminated in the second round. |
| Mission II | Round 2: A game to save | 10 | A | Boa (SeSeSe) Park Joon-myun (Brand New) Changjo (Swish) Lee Yi-kyung (Hi-Lite) Jang Ki-yong (Hot Chicks) | – | Lee Yi-kyung got eliminated in the second round. |
| Mission II | Round 2: A game to save | 10 | B | Michelle Lee (SeSeSe) Park Kwang-sun (Brand New) Moon Hee-kyung (Swish) N.CA (Hi-Lite) Choi Sung-joon (Hot Chicks) | – | Choi Sung-joon got eliminated in the second round. |

ELIM The contestant was eliminated.
Win The contestant won.

=== Semi-Finale ===
| Round | Episode | House | Contestant | Producer | Notes |
|---|---|---|---|---|---|
| 1 Topic: Adieu 2016 | 11 | SeSeSe | Park Kwang-sun | MC Sniper | |
| 1 Topic: Adieu 2016 | 11 | Brand New | Park Joon-myun Yang Mi-ra | P-Type | featuring San E |
| 1 Topic: Adieu 2016 | 11 | Swish | Changjo | Basick Joo-suk Microdot | |
| 1 Topic: Adieu 2016 | 11 | Hi-Lite | Moon Hee-kyung* | G2 | featuring Luna (fx) Moon Hee-kyung & G2 got eliminated in this round. |
| 1 Topic: Adieu 2016 | 11 | Hot Chicks | Chang Sung-hwan | Cheetah | |
| 2 Topic: 2017 | 12 | Swish | Changjo | Basick Joo-suk Microdot | featuring Kim Nam-joo (Apink) Changjo, Basick, Joo-suk & Microdot (whole House of Swish) got eliminated. |
| 2 Topic: 2017 | 12 | Hot Chicks | Jang Ki-yong | LE Yezi | |
| 2 Topic: 2017 | 12 | SeSeSe | Boa | DinDin Jooheon | |
| 2 Topic: 2017 | 12 | Hi-Lite | Michelle Lee* N.CA | Paloalto Reddy | featuring Jay Black (Dance) |
| 2 Topic: 2017 | 12 | Brand New | Kang Seung-hyun Kim Ki-ri | Hanhae Minos | |

*Moon Hee-kyung & Michelle Lee changed to the House of Hi-Lite.

=== Finale ===
| Contestant | Producer | House | Votes | Notes |
|---|---|---|---|---|
| Chang Sung-hwan | Paloalto | Hi-Lite | 153 | They got 2 golden keys. |
| Jang Ki-yong | MC Sniper | SeSeSe | 131 | They lost to Chang Sung-hwan & Paloalto. |
| Yang Mi-ra | Cheetah | Hot Chicks | 129 | They lost to Chang Sung-hwan & Paloalto. |
| Kang Seung-hyun | Hanhae | Brand New | 182 | featuring Samuel Seo They won against Chang Sung-hwan & Paloalto. They got 1 golden key. |
| Michelle Lee | Jooheon | SeSeSe | 185 | They won against Kang Seung-hyun & Hanhae. They got 3 golden keys. |
| N.CA | LE Yezi | Hot Chicks | 126 | They lost to Michelle Lee & Jooheon. |
| Park Kwang-sun | P-Type | Brand New | 165 | They lost to Michelle Lee & Jooheon. |
| Park Joon-myun | Minos | Brand New | 187 | They won against Michelle Lee & Jooheon. They got 2 golden keys. They won the first place. |
| Kim Ki-ri | DinDin | SeSeSe | 172 | They lost to Park Joon-myun & Minos. |
| Boa | Reddy | Hi-Lite | 160 | They lost to Park Joon-myun & Minos. |
