= Show Me the Money 8 =

- Season 8
- Hosted by: Kim Jin-pyo; Holiship (Resident DJ)
- Judges: 40 Crew: Swings; Mad Clown; Kid Milli; BOYCOLD; BGM-v Crew: Verbal Jint; Giriboy; BewhY millic
- Winner: Punchnello
- Runner-up: Young B

Release
- Original network: Mnet
- Original release: July 26 – September 27, 2019

Season chronology
- ← Previous; Show Me the Money 777 Next → Show Me the Money 9

The eighth season of the series Show Me the Money, known as Show Me the Money 8 (also referred to as SMTM8), premiered on July 26, 2019 and ended on September 27, 2019. It is broadcast every Friday at 23:00 (KST) on Mnet.

Unlike the previous seasons, this season will consist of two crews: 40 Crew which consisted of judges Swings, Mad Clown, Kid Milli, & Boycold, and BGM-v Crew which consisted of Verbal Jint, Giriboy, BewhY & Millic.

The winner for this season was Punchnello of BGM-v Crew, and will receive ₩200,000,000 and a 2019 Chevrolet Blazer.

== Judges ==
40 Crew

- Swings: Founder and rapper of Just Music and its sub-labels Indigo Music and WEDAPLUGG Records. Previously participated in season 2 as a contestant under Team D.O, and in seasons 3 and 7 as a judge/producer alongside San E under Team Brand New Music and Giriboy under Team Just Music, respectively.
- Mad Clown: Rapper who was formerly signed under Starship Entertainment. Previously participated as a contestant in season 2, in season 7 under his alter-ego Mommy Son, and as a judge in season 5.
- Kid Milli: Rapper who is currently signed to Just Music's sub-label Indigo Music. Member of WYBH and COZYBOYS crews. Previously participated as a contestant in season 4, and in season 7 where he won 2nd runner-up.
- BOYCOLD: Music producer who is a member of YELOWS MOB crew.

BGM-v Crew

- Verbal Jint: Rapper under Brand New Music. Previously participated in season 1 as a contestant and in season 4 as a judge/producer for Team Brand New Music.
- Giriboy: Rapper, songwriter and record producer signed under Just Music and WEDAPLUGG Records. Previously participated in season 3 as a contestant under Team YDG and a judge/producer in season 7 with Team Just Music. Member of WYBH crew.
- BewhY: Rapper and producer who participated in season 4 and became the show's champion in season 5. Part of $EXYSTREET crew. Currently signed under his own label Dejavu Group.
- millic: DJ and producer, member of crews FANXYCHILD and Club Eskimo. Formerly signed under YG Entertainment's defunct sub-label HIGHGRND.

== Crews ==
During the Crew Choosing Round, contestants chose which crew they would be joining. As of the Crew Song Mission Round, the remaining contestants will serve as the official and final members of their respective crews.

40 Crew

- Final Members
  - Yunhway: Signed under Just Music's sub-label WEDAPLUGG records. Member of duo sAewoo in YUNHWAY with labelmate and producer sAewoo. Prior to signing to WEDAPLUGG Records, she was a model when she lived in the United States.
  - EK: Member of MostBadassAsian (MBA) crew under Stoneship. Previously participated in season 7 as a member of Team VMC. Auditioned in SBS K-Pop Star.
  - Bully: Also known as Bully Da Ba$tard. Ex-member of DICKIDS crew. Currently signed with Fame Records. Previously auditioned for season 6 but was disqualified after posting on social media that he passed that season's preliminary round before that season started its broadcast, and in season 7. He also was a contestant on the first and second season of High School Rapper having 40 Crew producer Swings as one of his mentors, under his real name Yoon Byeong-ho.
  - BRYN: Member of now disbanded DICKIDS crew with fellow contestant Young B. Previously participated in season 5, 6 and 7. Currently signed to Underbar Records.
  - Donutman: Member of Clarity crew. Previously participated in season 5 in which he was notably eliminated after Team Mad Clown-Gill judge/producer Mad Clown gave the mic to fellow team member #GUN instead of him during the First Live Performance Round, and specially performed in season 7 where he performed with Mad Clown's alter-ego Mommy Son at that season's final episode.
  - YunB: Signed under Hi-Lite Records. Previously participated in season 7 as a member of Team Just Music.
  - Olltii: Member of freestyle rap crew Angdreville (ADV) Crew. Current host of the YouTube freestyle rap show 7INDAYS and former MC host for the fourth season of MICSWAGGER. Previously participated in season 3 as a member of Team YG and in season 6 as a member of Team CoDean.
  - Kim Seung-min: Member of WYBH crew with fellow contestant CHOILB, Team BGM-v judge/producer Giriboy and Team 40 Crew judge/producer Kid Milli. He is also an artist signed to Beautiful Noise label along with Team 40 Crew judge Mad Clown's alter-ego Mommy Son. Previously participated in season 7. He was eliminated in the 1-on-1 Crew Battle Round, but was later revived by the 40 Crew producers.
  - Lil tachi: Signed under Just Music's sub-label WEDAPLUGG records with fellow 40 Crew member YUNHWAY. Previously participated in season 7 and in the 3rd season of High School Rapper, where he was also known by his real name Kang Hyun-joon. He was eliminated in the 1-on-1 Crew Battle Round, but was later revived by the 40 Crew producers.
  - TAKUWA: Member of ΔZΠΟ2 crew.
- Eliminated
  - Owen Ovadoz: Rapper and member of the crew/record company MKIT RAIN. Previously participated in seasons 3, 4 and 7. Eliminated after the Producer Crew Battle.
  - A-Chess: Member of SP1B crew. Participated in all the previous seasons but only advanced further the Rapper Evaluation round in season 7. Eliminated before the Producer Crew Battle.
  - Young Blood X: Independent rapper. Eliminated before the Producer Crew Battle.
  - Mushvenom: Independent rapper. Also known by his nickname TRICKER. Previously participated in seasons 2 and 6. Eliminated before the Producer Crew Battle.
  - Yuja: Member of Wallo Kids crew (왈로키즈). Showed an impressive performance during the One Minute Rap round but was eliminated in the Group Challenge Round after forgetting her lyrics. She was later revived with the Crew Pass used by the 40 Crew. Eliminated in the Revival Round.
  - Yung Sog Wave: Independent rapper. Eliminated in the Revival Round.
  - Cox Billy: Masked contestant who later revealed himself to be J'Kyun during the 1-on-1 Round. Signed under GRVV lab and former member of Lucky J. Previously participated in season 2 as a member of D.O. crew and in season 5. Eliminated in the 1-on-1 Crew Battle.
  - Sway D: Signed under Hi-Lite Records. Previously participated in season 6 and 7. Eliminated in the 1-on-1 Crew Battle.
  - Boo Hyun-seok: Member of FRIEMILLI crew. Previously participated in season 3 as a member Team Brand New Music and in season 7. Also known by his rapper name SNAP OUT. Eliminated in the 1-on-1 Crew Battle.
  - Slick O'Domar: Member of OSAMARI crew. Previously participated in season 7. Eliminated in the 1-on-1 Crew Battle.
  - Loxx Punkman: Independent rapper who won Angdreville (ADV) Crew's Street Rap Sh#t (SRS) competition in 2017. Eliminated in the 1-on-1 Crew Battle.
  - KOR KASH: Currently signed with Stone Music Entertainment and Warner Music Korea. Previously participated in season 6 under his real name So Hyun-seung in which he gained popularity after his match-up with BGM-v crew's contestant Woodie Gochild, and in season 7. Eliminated in the 1-on-1 Crew Battle, after losing again to Woodie Gochild.
  - O'Day O$A: Member of 49CREW. Eliminated in the 1-on-1 Crew Battle.
  - Layone: Former Independent rapper who later signed with OUTLIVE Records after his elimination from the show. Previously participated in season 6. Gained recognition this season after his Group Battle Round performance with Zizo and livur. Eliminated in the 1-on-1 Crew Battle.
  - DOGGYNOM: Member of DICKIDS crew with fellow contestants BRYN and Young B. Eliminated in the 1-on-1 Crew Battle.
  - Leebido: Signed under Layback Records. Eliminated in the 1-on-1 Crew Battle.
  - Siggie Feb: Member of NMNB crew. Eliminated in the 1-on-1 Crew Battle.

BGM-v Crew

- Final Members
  - Punchnello: Currently signed with AOMG. Member of Club Eskimo crew with Team BGM-v producer/judge millic. Formerly signed under YG Entertainment's defunct sub-label HIGHGRND. Previously participated in season 6 in which he had to drop out after the 1-on-1 rounds to take care of his sick mother. He was shockingly eliminated in the 1-on-1 Crew Battle Round, but was later revived by the BGM-v Crew producers.
  - Dbo: Korean-Canadian rapper and member of FPL crew. Previously participated in season 3 under his real name Shim Hyun-bo, where YDG was notably the only judge that passed him in the One Minute Rap round, and in season 7.
  - CHOILB: Member of WYBH crew. Previously participated in season 7.
  - Seo Dong-hyeon: Also known by his rapper name BIG Naughty. He was eliminated in the Group Challenge Round, but was later revived with the Crew Pass used by the BGM-v Crew. On October 6, 2019 it was announced that he had signed with H1GHR MUSIC.
  - Mckdaddy: Member of Vagabonds Tribe. Previously participated in season 7.
  - Young B: Currently signed to Indigo Music, member of DICKIDS crew. Won the first season of High School Rapper, and participated in seasons 4 and 5, and in season 6 as a member of Team CODEAN. Also known by his real name Yang Hong-won and his other rapper name Borntong.
  - Zene the Zilla: Member of Young Thugs Club with fellow contestant Woodie Gochild. Signed under Illionaire Records' sub-label Ambition Muzik. Previously participated in season 7.
  - Woodie Gochild: Currently signed with AOMG's sub-label H1GHR MUSIC. Previously participated in season 6 with Team H1GHR Music.
  - JJANGYOU: Member of ILLAP crew and rap trio WAVISABIROOM.
  - Chillin Homie: Member of Naughty4Life (NFL) crew. Previously participated in season 7. After he was eliminated, he signed with GROOVL1N.
  - Kingchi Mane: Member of QZQY crew. He was eliminated in the 1-on-1 Crew Battle Round, but was later revived by the BGM-v Crew producers. He was officially eliminated on episode 6. (see controversies section)
- Eliminated
  - M1NU: 17 year old rapper currently signed under FRANK MUSIK. Eliminated before the Producer Crew Battle.
  - Mac9: Signed under FT Music Group. Eliminated before the Producer Crew Battle.
  - EPTEND: Member of Naughty 4 Life (NFL) crew with fellow contestant Chillin Homie and project team "6road" with fellow contestant Indego Kid. Signed under GOONTRAX. Eliminated before the Producer Crew Battle.
  - Ahn Byung-woong: Independent rapper. Eliminated before the Producer Crew Battle.
  - YANU: Rookie rapper. Eliminated before the Producer Crew Battle.
  - OVDL: Member of Puff Odd crew. Eliminated before the Producer Crew Battle.
  - Untell: Independent rapper. Previously participated in High School Rapper season 3, where he was also known by his real name Oh Dong-hwan. Eliminated in the Revival Round.
  - Veiniyfl: Member of A$IAN CLUB crew. Eliminated in the Revival Round.
  - unnofficialboyy: Rapper and ex-leader of Dickids crew and member of XXYXNAF crew. Signed under FAME Records. Previously participated in season 5 and 7, and the first season of High School Rapper. Also known by his rap names LUDA, TRAPSTARSUREEN, and Baddie Homie, and through his real name Lee Su-rin. Eliminated in the 1-on-1 Crew Battle.
  - Heo Sung-hyun: Also known by his rapper name ROSE DE PENNY. Member of Chord_184 crew. Eliminated in the 1-on-1 Crew Battle.
  - Bla$e Kid: Member of HIVE and Rooftop crews. Signed under Luminant Entertainment. Eliminated in the 1-on-1 Crew Battle.
  - HunnyHunna: Member of Juicy Wave crew. Eliminated in the 1-on-1 Crew Battle.
  - Naughty Mae: Independent rapper. Eliminated in the 1-on-1 Crew Battle.
  - LO VOLF: Rookie rapper signed under Warner Music Korea. Eliminated in the 1-on-1 Crew Battle.
  - X: Independent rapper. Eliminated in the 1-on-1 Crew Battle.
  - Poy Muzeum: Member of Space Comma Crew. Previously participated in seasons 6 and 7. Eliminated in the 1-on-1 Crew Battle.

== Rounds ==
Prior to Round One, about 16,000 contestants sent in their audition clips to the production crew and each clip will be viewed by the production crew. About 2,000 contestants were selected to participate in Round One.

=== Round One: Rapper Selection Round ===
After sending in their audition clips, those selected by the production crew will attend this round. These contestants would be judged by the producer crews through a short a cappella rap. Chains are handed to the contestants that have passed to the next round. The difference for this season is that in this round, contestants who were eliminated can have a second judging. In the second judging, contestants will be judged by the other producer crew that did not judge them in the first judging. (Note: Example: NUCK was judged by 40 Crew's Swings, and in the second judging he would be judged by BGM-v Crew's BewhY) It is also possible for contestants who passed the first judging to take part in the second judging.

Notable Rappers from the Rapper Selection Round

Producer Judge	Passed the Rapper Selection Round	Failed the Rapper Selection Round
Swings	Cox Billy, MATTRIX, Dino.T, bxen	NUCK, Brian Oh, Wonstein
Kid Milli	Chillin Homie, Jiho Givenchy, Blanc, M1NU, livur, Walo	
Mad Clown	EPTEND, Lil tachi	Woo Jin-young, Song Jae-hoon
BOYCOLD	Mckdaddy, YunB, Ahn Byung-woong, Zizo, Yuja, YUNG SOG WAVE, YOUNG BLOOD X	Munchman, Dunchii, Giriboy Look-a-Like, Reddy Look-a-Like,
Verbal Jint	JJANGYOU, Seo Dong-hyeon, EK, Woodie Gochild, Layone	The Quiett Impersonator, BewhY Look-a-Like, Zion T Look-a-Like
Giriboy	Leebido, TAKUWA	Swervy, Choi Eun-seo, D-Hack
BewhY	Punchnello, Young B, Veiniyfl, Dbo, CHOILB	Anngyeungjaebae, Cha Yoo-jin
millic	YUNHWAY, BRYN, LO VOLF, Kim Tae-yeop	

Notable Rappers from the Second Judging

First Judging Producer Judge	Second Judging Producer Judge	Rapper
Giriboy	Mad Clown	Choi Eun-seo
Mad Clown	Giriboy	Song Jae-hoon
Giriboy	Mad Clown	Swervy
Mad Clown	millic	Woo Jin-young
Swings	BewhY	NUCK
Swings	Verbal Jint	Brian Oh
BewhY	Swings	Young B

Advances to the next round through revival
Eliminated from the show
Passed both First and Second Judging

=== Round Two: One Minute Rap ===
Contestants each have one minute to rap in front of all judges. Unlike previous seasons, each judge will individually give a pass or fail to the contestant. The contestant must get at least one pass to move on to the next round. Otherwise, he/she is eliminated from the competition.

Notable Rappers at the One-Minute Rap Round

Rapper	BOYCOLD	Mad Clown	Kid Milli	Swings	Verbal Jint	Giriboy	BewhY	millic
Woodie Gochild	PASS	FAIL	FAIL	FAIL	PASS	FAIL	FAIL	PASS
Donutman	PASS	PASS	PASS	PASS	FAIL	FAIL	PASS	PASS
Ahn Byung-woong	PASS	PASS	PASS	PASS	PASS	PASS	PASS	PASS
ZENE THE ZILLA	PASS	PASS	PASS	PASS	PASS	PASS	PASS	PASS
JDG	FAIL	FAIL	FAIL	FAIL	FAIL	FAIL	FAIL	FAIL
Sway D	PASS	PASS	PASS	PASS	PASS	PASS	PASS	PASS
Olltii	PASS	PASS	PASS	FAIL	PASS	PASS	PASS	PASS
Punchnello	PASS	PASS	PASS	FAIL	PASS	PASS	PASS	PASS
Zizo	FAIL	PASS	FAIL	FAIL	FAIL	PASS	FAIL	FAIL
Owen Ovadoz	PASS	PASS	PASS	PASS	PASS	PASS	PASS	PASS
Veiniyfl	PASS	PASS	PASS	PASS	PASS	PASS	FAIL	PASS
YUNHWAY	FAIL	PASS	FAIL	FAIL	FAIL	FAIL	FAIL	FAIL
Swervy	FAIL	FAIL	FAIL	FAIL	FAIL	FAIL	FAIL	FAIL
MATTRIX	PASS	PASS	PASS	PASS	PASS	FAIL	FAIL	PASS
Yuja	PASS	PASS	PASS	PASS	PASS	PASS	PASS	PASS
Kkalchang	FAIL	FAIL	FAIL	FAIL	FAIL	FAIL	FAIL	FAIL
Mckdaddy	PASS	PASS	PASS	PASS	PASS	PASS	PASS	PASS
Seo Dong-hyun	FAIL	PASS	PASS	PASS	PASS	PASS	PASS	PASS
Layone	PASS	PASS	PASS	PASS	FAIL	PASS	PASS	PASS
CHOILB	PASS	PASS	PASS	PASS	PASS	PASS	PASS	PASS
Changstarr	FAIL	FAIL	FAIL	FAIL	FAIL	FAIL	FAIL	FAIL
Woo Jin-young	FAIL	FAIL	FAIL	FAIL	FAIL	FAIL	FAIL	FAIL
JJANGYOU	PASS	PASS	PASS	PASS	PASS	PASS	PASS	PASS
Kim Seung-min	PASS	PASS	PASS	PASS	PASS	PASS	PASS	PASS
Neal	FAIL	FAIL	FAIL	FAIL	FAIL	FAIL	FAIL	FAIL
Choi Eun-seo	FAIL	FAIL	FAIL	FAIL	FAIL	FAIL	FAIL	FAIL
Untell	PASS	PASS	PASS	PASS	PASS	PASS	PASS	PASS
Lil tachi	PASS	PASS	PASS	PASS	PASS	PASS	PASS	PASS
BRYN	PASS	PASS	PASS	PASS	PASS	PASS	PASS	PASS
Leebido	PASS	PASS	FAIL	FAIL	PASS	PASS	PASS	PASS
Dbo	PASS	PASS	PASS	PASS	PASS	PASS	PASS	PASS
EK	PASS	PASS	PASS	PASS	PASS	PASS	PASS	PASS
Young B	PASS	PASS	PASS	PASS	PASS	PASS	PASS	PASS
Kim Kang-woo	FAIL	FAIL	FAIL	FAIL	FAIL	FAIL	FAIL	FAIL
Volcano	FAIL	FAIL	FAIL	FAIL	FAIL	FAIL	FAIL	FAIL
LO VOLF	PASS	PASS	PASS	PASS	PASS	PASS	PASS	FAIL
YunB	PASS	PASS	PASS	PASS	PASS	PASS	PASS	PASS
Slick O'Domar	PASS	PASS	PASS	PASS	PASS	PASS	PASS	PASS
Kingchi Mane	PASS	PASS	PASS	PASS	PASS	PASS	PASS	PASS
Bully	PASS	PASS	PASS	PASS	PASS	PASS	PASS	PASS
YANU	FAIL	FAIL	FAIL	FAIL	FAIL	FAIL	PASS	PASS

Other notable rappers from the Rapper Selection Round

Number of Pass Scores	Rappers
7 PASS	New Champ
6 PASS	Jiho Givenchy, IV, Boo Hyun-seok, Playback, Chillin Homie
5 PASS	Loxx Punkman, Brian Oh, EPTEND, IndEgo Aid, HunnyHunna, unofficialboyy, CH, Bla$e Kid
4 PASS	Bison, Hahoe, M1NU, Cox Billy
3 PASS	TAKUWA, Camo
2 PASS	Hanwool, A-Chess, SHARKRAMA, Boy Wonder, X, Alpha Kid, FR:EDEN, WVN
1 PASS	William Challenge, 100KGOLD, MUSHVENOM, Siggie Feb, Jackal, livur, Kim Seung-ho, Kim Dae-woo, A$hiroo

=== Round Three: Group Challenge ===
Also known as the Half Elimination Judging. The 88 contestants who have progressed from the One Minute Rap round will be categorized based on the number of passes each of them receive. From there, they will each choose a beat from 12 beats available and get themselves into groups based on the beats chosen. Each beat can have more than one group performing. The judges would evaluate each contestant based on their performances. Both crews would each choose the worst contestant(s) from each rap beat to eliminate, or can choose not to eliminate any. For each beat, up to half the number of contestants who have chosen the beat would be eliminated. A hidden rule in this round is Crew Pass, which can be used by each crew only once to revive a contestant who has been eliminated in this round.

Beat	Contestant(s)	Eliminated Contestant(s)	Crew Pass Used On
CLiQ (ft. Alika) - Wavey	Group 1: IndEgo Aid, Kim Dae-won, HunnyHunna; Group 2: Veiniyfl, Chillin Homie, M1NU	IndEgo Aid, Kim Dae-won	—
Cardi B - Bodak Yellow	Group 1: Siggie Feb, Jackal, Jiho Givenchy; Group 2: Yuja, Alpha Kid, WVN, O'day O$A; Group 3: OVDL, Cox Billy, Naughty Mae	Yuja, WVN, Alpha Kid, Jiho Givenchy	Yuja (Note: Used by 40 Crew)
The Notorious B.I.G. - Who Shot Ya?	Group 1: Ahn Byung-woong, Hanwool, Owen Ovadoz, Bison; Group 2: Loxx Punkman, New Champ, YunB, Punchnello	Bison, Hanwool, New Champ	—
SG Lewis (ft. AlunaGeorge) - Hurting	William Challenge, Kim Seung-min, YUNHWAY	William Challenge	—
Nas - Nas Is Like	Group 1: Brian Oh, Snock, POY Muzeum; Group 2: Donutman, Mckdaddy, A-Chess, EPTEND; Group 3: SHARKRAMA, Young B	Snock, Brian Oh, SHARKRAMA	—
Chris Brown - Loyal	Group 1: EK, IV, Woodie Gochild, ZENE THE ZILLA; Group 2: Seo Dong-hyeon, 100KGOLD, Hahoe	IV, 100KGOLD, Hahoe, Seo Dong-hyeon	Seo Dong-hyeon (Note: Used by BGM-v Crew)
G-Eazy - No Limit	Group 1: Layone, Zizo, livur Group 2: Lil tachi, Boo Hyun-seok, K$H; Group 3: Dbo, Sway D, JJANGYOU	livur, K$H, Zizo	—
YG - Big Bank	Mac9, CHOILB, Kingchi Mane, Playback, bxen	Playback, bxen	—
Tyga - Taste	Group 1: Zesty, Camo, Heo Sung-hyun; Group 2: BRYN, Bla$e Kid, Wo66le, DOGGYNOM	Zesty, Camo, Wo66le	—
Famous Dex - Pick It Up	Group 1: LO VOLF, A$hiroo, unofficialboyy Group 2: Young Blood X, TAKUWA, MATTRIX; Group 3: Leebido, Boy Wonder, Olltii	A$hiroo, MATTRIX, Boy Wonder	—
Lil Yachty - Who Want The Smoke?	Group 1: YANU, YUNG SOG WAVE, FR:EDEN, CH; Group 2: Bully, Jung Woo-jin, KOR KASH	FR:EDEN, Jung Woo-jin	—
Travis Scott - SICKO MODE	Kim Seung-ho, MUSHVENOM, Slick O'domar, Untell, King Sushi, Tommy Strate, X	Kim Seung-ho, King Sushi, Tommy Strate	—

- Originally advanced to the next round but voluntarily left the show after his recent controversy (see controversy section). The show's producers decided to blur out the contestant until his official elimination from the show.

=== Round Four: Crew Choosing ===
Different from previous seasons, the remaining 54 contestants will choose which producer crew they'll join. The contestant will press the remote control in which the stage of the producer crew he/she did not choose will be lowered down with flames showing up (similar to what eliminated contestants faced after the One Minute Rap round) while the chosen Producer Crew will welcome the contestant and will go the waiting room with other contestants from the same crew.

- Contestant CH did not appear starting from this round, and it is rumoured that he has voluntarily left the show, while to make the numbers even, contestant Jackal was eliminated due to him not being picked at all in an undisclosed scene of episode 4.

40 Crew	BGM-v Crew
Kim Seung-min	Mac9
Donutman	Mckdaddy
Layone	Veinifyl
Loxx Punkman	Bla$e Kid
Lil tachi	Seo Dong-hyeon
MUSHVENOM	Ahn Byung-woong
Boo Hyun-seok	unofficialboyy
Bully	Untell
BRYN	EPTEND
Sway D	Young B
Slick O'Domar	Woodie Gochild
Siggy Feb	ZENE THE ZILLA
A-Chess	JJANGYOU
Young Blood X	CHOILB
O'day O$A	Chillin Homie
Owen Ovadoz	Kingchi Mane
Olltii	Punchnello
Yuja	Poy Muzeum
YunB	HunnyHanna
YUNHWAY	Heo Sung-hyun
KOR KASH	Dbo
TAKUWA	LO VOLF
Cox Billy	M1NU
DOGGYNOM	Naughty Mae
EK	OVDL
Leebido	X
YUNG SOG WAVE	YANU

- Originally advanced to the next round but voluntarily left the show after his recent controversy (see controversy section). The show's producers decided to blur out the contestant until his official elimination from the show.

=== Round Five: 1-on-1 Crew Battle ===
MC Kim Jin-pyo will flip a coin with the names of both crews. When one of the crews has been flipped, he will select 1 contestant from that crew and that selected contestant will pick an opponent from the opposite crew to compete in the 1-on-1 crew rap battles. The paired contestants will choose a beat or song from the producer crews that they will perform in the producers crews' special stages. Unlike previous seasons, special guest judges will be joining the producer judges in determining the winner for this round: YDG (season 3 producer judge), Dynamic Duo (season 6 judges), Paloalto (season 4 and 7 judge), Nafla (season 7 champion), Rhythm Power (Hangzoo (season 4 contestant and season 6 champion), Geegooin (season 4 and 6 contestant) and Boi B (season 5 and 7 contestant), Basick (season 4 champion), TakeOne (season 1 contestant), Geeks' Lil Boi (season 4 contestant), Flowsik (season 5 contestant), pH-1 (season 7 contestant) and Crush. The winners of their respective match-ups will move on to the next round. If the match-up ends up in a tie of number of votes, a sudden death battle will be done. After the 1-on-1 battles, each crew would select 4 of their eliminated crew members to take part in the revival battle, and only 2 from each crew can progress to the next round.

1-on-1 battles
40	vs.	BGM-v
A-Chess	vs.	Veiniyfl
TAKUWA	vs.	Heo Sung-hyun
Olltii	vs.	Untell
Slick O'Domar	vs.	Ahn Byung-woong
Sway D	vs.	ZENE THE ZILLA
Cox Billy (Later revealed as J'Kyun)	vs.	Mckdaddy
YUNHWAY	vs.	LO VOLF
Boo Hyun-seok	vs.	CHOILB (via Sudden Death)
KOR KASH	vs.	Woodie Gochild
YunB	vs.	Poy Muzeum
Leebido	vs.	OVDL
Donutman	vs.	Bla$e Kid
Yuja	vs.	Seo Dong-hyeon
Loxx Punkman	vs.	Dbo
Layone	vs.	JJANGYOU
MUSHVENOM	vs.	Punchnello
Lil tachi	vs.	EPTEND
Kim Seung-min	vs.	YANU
YUNG SOG WAVE	vs.	Young B
EK	vs.	Naughty Mae
Bully	vs.	X
M1NU	vs.	O'Day O$A
Owen Ovadoz	vs.	Kingchi Mane
Young Blood X	vs.	unofficialboyy
BRYN	vs.	HunnyHanna
DOGGYNOM	vs.	Mac9
Siggy Feb	vs.	Chillin Homie

Indicates the winning contestant.
Eliminated from the show.
Lost in the 1-on-1 round but chosen to participate in the Revival Round.

Revival Round

Crew	Rapper	Revived/Eliminated
40 Crew	YUNG SOG WAVE	Eliminated
40 Crew	Lil tachi	Revived
40 Crew	Kim Seung-min	Revived
40 Crew	Yuja	Eliminated
BGM-v Crew	Veiniyfl	Eliminated
BGM-v Crew	Untell	Eliminated
BGM-v Crew	Punchnello	Revived
BGM-v Crew	Kingchi Mane	Revived

- Originally advanced to the next round but voluntarily left the show after his recent controversy (see controversy section). The show's producers decided to blur out the contestant until his official elimination from the show.

Advances to the next round through revival
Eliminated from the show

=== Round Six: Producer Crew Performances + Producer Crew Battles ===
Both crews will perform in front of a live audience, including 1 new song from each crew, to determine who will get the first crew song track for the show. After the performances, the remaining 31 contestants (14 from 40 Crew, 17 from BGM-v Crew) will compete in the Producer Crew Battle. Before the Producer Crew Battle, both crews have to eliminate contestants until each crew has only 11 contestants remaining. Special guest judges for the Producer Crew Battle are Loopy (season 7 runner-up), Chaboom (season 7 contestant), Junoflo (season 5 and 6 contestant), The Quiett (seasons 3, 5 and 7 judge), Basick (season 4 champion), Lil Boi (season 4 contestant), TakeOne (season 1 contestant) and Paloalto (season 4 and 7 judge). For the Producer Crew Battle, similar to last season, each group will take turns as they do freestyle/pre-rehearsed raps under certain beats. The winning crew will advance to the next round while the losing crew will have its producers choose 1 contestant to eliminate. In the case of a tie after two rounds, a third round will be held to determine the winning crew.

Crew	Producer Judge	Song(s)	Winning Producer Crew Performance
40 Crew	Swings	"Bulldozer"	40 Crew
40 Crew	Mad Clown	"Lost Without You", "Stupid In Love" (ft. Soyou)	40 Crew
40 Crew	Kid Milli	"It's Heavy"	40 Crew
40 Crew	Swings, Kid Milli, Mad Clown	"Fill It Up" (담아) (ft. YUMDDA, pH-1) (Prod. BOYCOLD)	40 Crew
BGM-v Crew	Verbal Jint	"I", "Born Hater", "You Look Good", "1219 Epiphany"	40 Crew
BGM-v Crew	Giriboy	"I'm Sick" (ft. NO:EL), "Bumpercar" (ft. NO:EL, Han Yo-han)	40 Crew
BGM-v Crew	BewhY	"Adaption", "Forever", "GOTTASADAE", "I Did It"	40 Crew
BGM-v Crew	Bewhy, Giriboy, Verbal Jint, millic	"Too Loud" (요란) (Prod. millic)	40 Crew

- Indicates the new song performed by the Producer Crew's judges

Elimination Selection

Rapper	Crew
Young Blood X	40 Crew
MUSHVENOM	40 Crew
A-Chess	40 Crew
Mac9	BGM-v Crew
M1NU	BGM-v Crew
EPTEND	BGM-v Crew
YANU	BGM-v Crew
OVDL	BGM-v Crew
Ahn Byung-woong	BGM-v Crew

Round 1
Song	40 Crew	vs.	BGM-v Crew	Winning Crew
LSD - Genius	Kim Seung-min	vs.	Dbo	BGM-v Crew
Chance The Rapper - Wala Cam	TAKUWA	vs.	Seo Dong-hyeon	BGM-v Crew
Lil Pump - Butterfly Doors	YunB	vs.	ZENE THE ZILLA	BGM-v Crew
Jay-Z - Song Cry	Owen Ovadoz	vs.	JJANGYOU	BGM-v Crew
Billie Eilish - bad guy	YUNHWAY	vs.	Woodie Gochild	BGM-v Crew
Stormzy - Vossi Bop	Bully	vs.	Chillin Homie	BGM-v Crew

Round 2
Song	40 Crew	vs.	BGM-v Crew	Winning Crew
Pusha T - Nosetalgia	Donutman	vs.	Kingchi Mane	BGM-v Crew
Puff Daddy - I'll Be Missing You	Lil tachi	vs.	CHOILB	BGM-v Crew
Vince Staples - Yeah Right	BRYN	vs.	Punchnello	BGM-v Crew
Kendrick Lamar (ft. The Weeknd) - Pray for Me	Olltii	vs.	Mckdaddy	BGM-v Crew
Rae Sremmurd - YNO	EK	vs.	Young B	BGM-v Crew

Eliminated from the show

- Originally advanced to the next round but voluntarily left the show after his recent controversy (see controversy section). The show's producers decided to blur out the contestant until his official elimination from the show.

=== Round Seven: Crew Song Mission ===
Previously known as the Team Song Mission Round. Different from previous seasons, each producer crew will split its members into two groups and will perform in front of all the judges. At the end of each group performance, the producers of each crew will eliminate one contestant from each group, while the rest of the members of that group will advance to the next round, with their songs officially released as part of this season's official discography.

Crew	Rappers	Song	Eliminated Rapper
40 Crew	YunB, Kim Seung-min, YUNHWAY, Donutman, Olltii	Relieve (덜어) (Prod. BOYCOLD)	Olltii
BGM-v Crew	Woodie Gochild, CHOILB, Seo Dong-hyeon, Kingchi Mane, Young B, Chillin Homie	Sea (바다) (Prod. Giriboy)	Kingchi Mane
40 Crew	Lil tachi, TAKUWA, BRYN, EK, Bully	Ddaeng Ddaeng (땡땡) (Prod. BOYCOLD)	Bully
BGM-v Crew	Punchnello, Dbo, ZENE THE ZILLA, JJANGYOU, Mckdaddy	BAMN (Prod. millic)	Dbo

- Originally advanced to this round but voluntarily left the show after his recent controversy (see controversy section). For this round, the show's producers decided to blur out the contestant while performing his lyrics for the Crew Song mission, in which he made a crucial mistake and caused his official elimination from the show.

=== Round Eight: Crew Diss Battle ===
After the Crew Song Mission Round, both producer crews will each split themselves into 3 groups, and will engage in a 3-on-3 diss battle in each round, except for one round where 40 Crew has 1 less member, hence a 2-on-3 diss battle will be held. The producers from both crews play rock, paper, scissors to determine the crew that gets to choose their match-ups for the whole round. Before the battle, both producer crews will be outdoors for their crew bonding missions to win benefits for the battle, with guest host DinDin, and preparations for the battle. Each of the 100 members of the audience will vote for only 1 crew after each round. The losing crew will have its producers choose 1 contestant to eliminate.

Crew Diss Battle

Round 1

40 Crew (58)	vs.	BGM-v Crew (42)
YUNHWAY	vs.	JJANGYOU, Punchnello
Kim Seung-min	vs.	CHOILB

Round 2

40 Crew (6)	vs.	BGM-v Crew (94)
TAKUWA	vs.	Woodie Gochild
Lil tachi	vs.	Seo Dong-hyeon
EK	vs.	ZENE THE ZILLA

Round 3

40 Crew (93)	vs.	BGM-v Crew (7)
Donutman	vs.	Chillin Homie
BRYN	vs.	Mckdaddy
YunB	vs.	Young B

Indicates the winning crew
Eliminated from the show

=== Round Nine: Crew Revenge Battle ===
Each of the matchups from the Crew Diss Battle will collaborate to perform new songs. 200 members of the audience will vote for only 1 contestant in each matchup. From each matchup, 1 contestant will be eliminated while the other will advance to the next round.

40 Crew Rapper	BGM-v Crew Rapper	Song	Total Live Audience Votes
TAKUWA	Woodie Gochild	Individuality Generation (개성시대)	120-80
Donutman	Punchnello	Comfortable (편해)	20-180
EK	ZENE THE ZILLA	24/7 (연중무휴)	131-69
Kim Seung-min	CHOILB	Sangsu (상수) (feat. George)	72-128
YunB	Young B	Truman Show (트루먼 쇼)	81-119
BRYN	Mckdaddy	Bonnie & Clyde	146-54
YUNHWAY	JJANGYOU	Gwangalli 101 (광안리101)	44-156
Lil tachi	Seo Dong-hyeon	CCTV	87-113

Advances to the next round
Eliminated from the show

=== Rounds Ten to Twelve: Show Me The Challenge Tournament Open ===
For the remaining rounds, the competition will be of a tournament basis. With BGM-v Crew having 5 members left and 40 Crew having only 3 members left, 2 members from BGM-v Crew will battle against each other. The contestant will perform in a live audience either alone or with a special guest performer(s). Based on 2 rounds of audience voting (total in ₩), the winners of each matchup will advance to the next round. The final episode will consist of the semi-finals and the final round. It will be televised live in which the performers will perform alone or with their respective producers and/or with special guest performer(s). This year's final round marks the first time where two contestants from the same crew faced each other in this round. The contestant with the most number of combined votes from both the live audience and TV viewers will win this season. In addition, there will be special performances for both the semi-final and final rounds: the semi-final round will have the first ever Show Me The Money Teenage Cypher, and the finals will include special performances from other eliminated contestants from the show and/or special guest performers.

First Live Performances
1	CHOILB	1,587,500
2	Young B	3,250,000
3	BRYN	1,387,500
4	Seo Dong-hyeon	3,512,500
5	EK	1,512,500
6	Punchnello	3,350,000
7	TAKUWA	2,650,000
8	JJANGYOU	2,087,500

Semifinals
Young B	4,316,580
Seo Dong-hyeon	3,513,420
Punchnello	4,141,540
TAKUWA	3,518,460

Finals
Young B	5,153,043
Punchnello	10,006,957

Show Me The Challenge: First Live Performances
#	40 Crew Rapper	vs.	#	BGM-v Crew Rapper	Total Live Audience Votes (in ₩)
3	BRYN (ft. Park Ji-min): Cupid	vs.	4	Seo Dong-hyeon (ft. Coogie): Problem (문제)	1,387,500-3,512,500
1	CHOILB (ft. Suran): When It Rains (비가 와)	vs.	2	Young B (ft. VINXEN): Sold Out	1,587,500-3,250,000
5	EK (ft. JUSTHIS): Diablo	vs.	6	Punchnello (ft. Hangzoo): MAGMA (Prod. BewhY)	1,512,500-3,350,000
7	TAKUWA (ft. Han Yo-han): Higher (위로)	vs.	8	JJANGYOU: Alone (혼자)	2,650,000-2,087,500

Advances to the semi-final round
Eliminated from the show

Show Me The Challenge: Semi-final Round Performances
Crew	Rapper	vs.	Crew	Rapper	Total Live Audience Votes + SMS Votes (in ₩)
BGM-v	Young B (ft. BewhY): Boy (소년)	vs.	BGM-v	Seo Dong-hyeon (ft. Giriboy): Phone Number (전화번호)	4,316,580-3,513,420
40	TAKUWA (ft. Swings, Kid Milli): I'm Going (갈래)	vs.	BGM-v	Punchnello (ft. Penomeco, Sam Kim): Jungle (정글)	3,518,460-4,141,540

Advances to the final round
Eliminated from the show

Special performances
Song	Show Me The Money 8 Contestant(s)
Let It Burn (Prod. The Quiett)	Ahn Byung-woong, Chillin Homie (with The Quiett)
Icebreaker (쇄빙선)	Zizo, Layone, livur
SchoolSICK (급SICK) (Show Me The Money Teenage Cypher) (video only)	M1NU, Layone, Veinifyl, Seo Dong-hyeon

Show Me The Challenge: Final Round Performances
Crew	Rapper	vs.	Crew	Rapper	Total Live Audience Votes + SMS Votes (in ₩)
BGM-v	Punchnello (ft. Kwon Jeong-yeol of 10cm): Sorry For Being Sorry (미안해서 미안해)	vs.	BGM-v	Young B (ft. Osshun Gum): No Cap	10,006,957-5,153,043

Indicates Winner of Show Me the Money 8
Indicates Runner-up Show Me the Money 8

- Seo Dong-hyeon and TAKUWA, who were eliminated in the semi-finals, had their own performance songs if they advanced to the finals, namely Seo Dong-hyun's "Astronaut (Prod. Oviz)" and TAKUWA's "Thanks" (기역시옷) (feat. Paloalto). These songs were then released together in the season's discography.

== Show Me The Money 8 Top 21 ==
Contestant	Crew	Round 1	Round 2	Round 3	Round 4	Round 5	Round 6	Round 7	Round 8	Round 9	Round 10	Semi-finals	Finals
Punchnello	BGM-v	PASS	7 PASS	PASS	PICKED	REVIVED	WON	PASS	LOST	PASS	PASS	PASS	WINNER
Young B	BGM-v	PASS	ALL PASS	PASS	PICKED	PASS	WON	PASS	LOST	PASS	PASS	PASS	Runner-up
BIG Naughty (Seo Dong-hyeon)	BGM-v	PASS	ALL PASS	REVIVED	PICKED	PASS	WON	PASS	WON	PASS	PASS	ELIM	
TAKUWA	40	PASS	3 PASS	PASS	PICKED	PASS	LOST	PASS	LOST	PASS	PASS	ELIM	
BRYN	40	PASS	ALL PASS	PASS	PICKED	PASS	LOST	PASS	WON	PASS	ELIM		
EK	40	PASS	ALL PASS	PASS	PICKED	PASS	LOST	PASS	LOST	PASS	ELIM		
JJANGYOU	BGM-v	PASS	ALL PASS	PASS	PICKED	PASS	WON	PASS	LOST	PASS	ELIM		
CHOILB	BGM-v	PASS	ALL PASS	PASS	PICKED	PASS	WON	PASS	LOST	PASS	ELIM		
YunB	40	PASS	ALL PASS	PASS	PICKED	PASS	LOSS	PASS	WON	ELIM			
Kim Seung-min	40	PASS	ALL PASS	PASS	PICKED	REVIVED	LOSS	PASS	WON	ELIM			
Lil tachi	40	PASS	ALL PASS	PASS	PICKED	REVIVED	LOST	PASS	LOST	ELIM			
Donutman	40	PASS	6 PASS	PASS	PICKED	PASS	LOST	PASS	WON	ELIM			
YUNHWAY	40	PASS	1 PASS	PASS	PICKED	PASS	LOST	PASS	WON	ELIM			
Mckdaddy	BGM-v	PASS	ALL PASS	PASS	PICKED	PASS	WON	PASS	LOST	ELIM			
ZENE THE ZILLA	BGM-v	PASS	ALL PASS	PASS	PICKED	PASS	WON	PASS	WON	ELIM			
Woodie Gochild	BGM-v	PASS	3 PASS	PASS	PICKED	PASS	WON	PASS	WON	ELIM			
Chillin Homie	BGM-v	PASS	6 PASS	PASS	PICKED	PASS	WON	PASS	ELIM				
Dbo	BGM-v	PASS	ALL PASS	PASS	PICKED	PASS	WON	ELIM					
Bully	40	PASS	ALL PASS	PASS	PICKED	PASS	LOST	ELIM					
Olltii	40	PASS	7 PASS	PASS	PICKED	PASS	LOST	ELIM					
Kingchi Mane*	BGM-v	PASS	ALL PASS	PASS*	PICKED*	REVIVED*	WON*	ELIM*					

WINNER The contestant won Show Me the Money 8.
Runner-Up The contestant was the runner-up.
ALL-PASS The contestant received an All-Pass during the second round.
7 PASS The contestant received one fail during the second round.
6 PASS The contestant received two fails during the second round.
5 PASS The contestant received three fails during the second round.
4 PASS The contestant received four fails during the second round.
3 PASS The contestant's received five fails the second round.
2 PASS The contestant received six fails in the second round.
1 PASS The contestant only received one pass during the second round.
ELIM The contestant was eliminated.
WON The contestant's crew won the Group Battle Round.
WON The contestant crew's group won their match-up in the Crew Diss battle round.
The contestant did not participate in this round.

Italicized - The contestant originally advanced and made it to the final Top 21 but voluntarily left the show after the Group Challenge Round due to his recent controversy (see Controversies section). The show's producers decided to blur out the contestant until his official elimination from the show.

== Controversies ==
- Kingchi Mane - Although officially not eliminated from the show, he voluntarily dropped out of the show as per request of the show's producers and Hankuk University of Foreign Studies, where he was studying, after sexually harassing women in an online chatroom in 2017. As of the 1-on-1 Crew Battle Round, the producers edited him out by blurring him until he was officially eliminated on episode 6.
- MATTRIX - Gained attention after he insulted the producers during the second round. He later issued death threats toward Swings on his Instagram. He eventually apologised but maintained his opinions about Swings.
