= Zene the Zilla =

South Korean rapper (born 1994)

Zene the Zilla 제네 더 질라
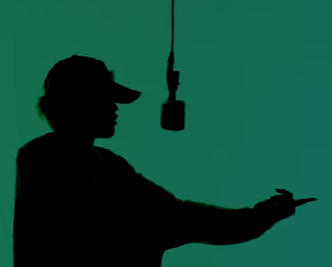
- Lee in 2021

Background information
- Born: Lee Sang-yong; July 7, 1994 (age 32); Chuncheon, Gangwon, South Korea
- Genres: Hip hop
- Occupation: Rapper
- Label: Ambition

Lee Sang-yong (Korean: 이상용; born July 4, 1994), known professionally as Zene the Zilla (Korean: 제네 더 질라), is a South Korean rapper. He first garnered attention when he appeared on Show Me the Money 777 in 2018.

== Early life ==
Lee was born in Chuncheon. He decided to become a rapper when he was in middle school. He graduated from Kangwon High School.

== Career ==
In September 2018, Zilla appeared on Show Me the Money 777. In December, he released his debut studio album Don't Call Me, I'm Flying High. In 2019, he signed to Ambition Musik. He released his second studio album Yamangkkun and appeared on Show Me the Money 8. In 2020, he released his third studio album FLOCC.

== Artistry ==
Zilla is known for his unique fashion and trot-like rap-singing performance.

== Discography ==
=== Studio albums ===
Title	Details	Peak chart position
Title	Details	KOR
Don't Call Me, I'm Flying High (전화하지마 비행 중이야)	Released: December 12, 2018; Label: Zillanation; Format: CD, streaming	97
Yamangkkun (야망꾼)	Released: July 24, 2019; Label: Ambition; Format: Streaming	—
FLOCC	Released: August 5, 2020; Label: Ambition; Format: CD, streaming	—

== Filmography ==
=== TV ===
Year	Title	Role
2018	Show Me the Money 777	Contestant
2019	Show Me the Money 8	Contestant
2024	Rap:Public	Contestant
2026	Show Me the Money 12	Contestant

== Awards and nominations ==
Award	Year	Nominee	Category	Result	Ref.
Korean Hip-hop Awards	2019	Himself	New Artist of the Year	Nominated	
Korean Hip-hop Awards	2021	"Swoosh Flow Remix" (Changmo feat. Zene the Zilla)	Collaboration of the Year	Nominated	
