= G2 (rapper) =

Korean-American rapper and singer

G2 황지투
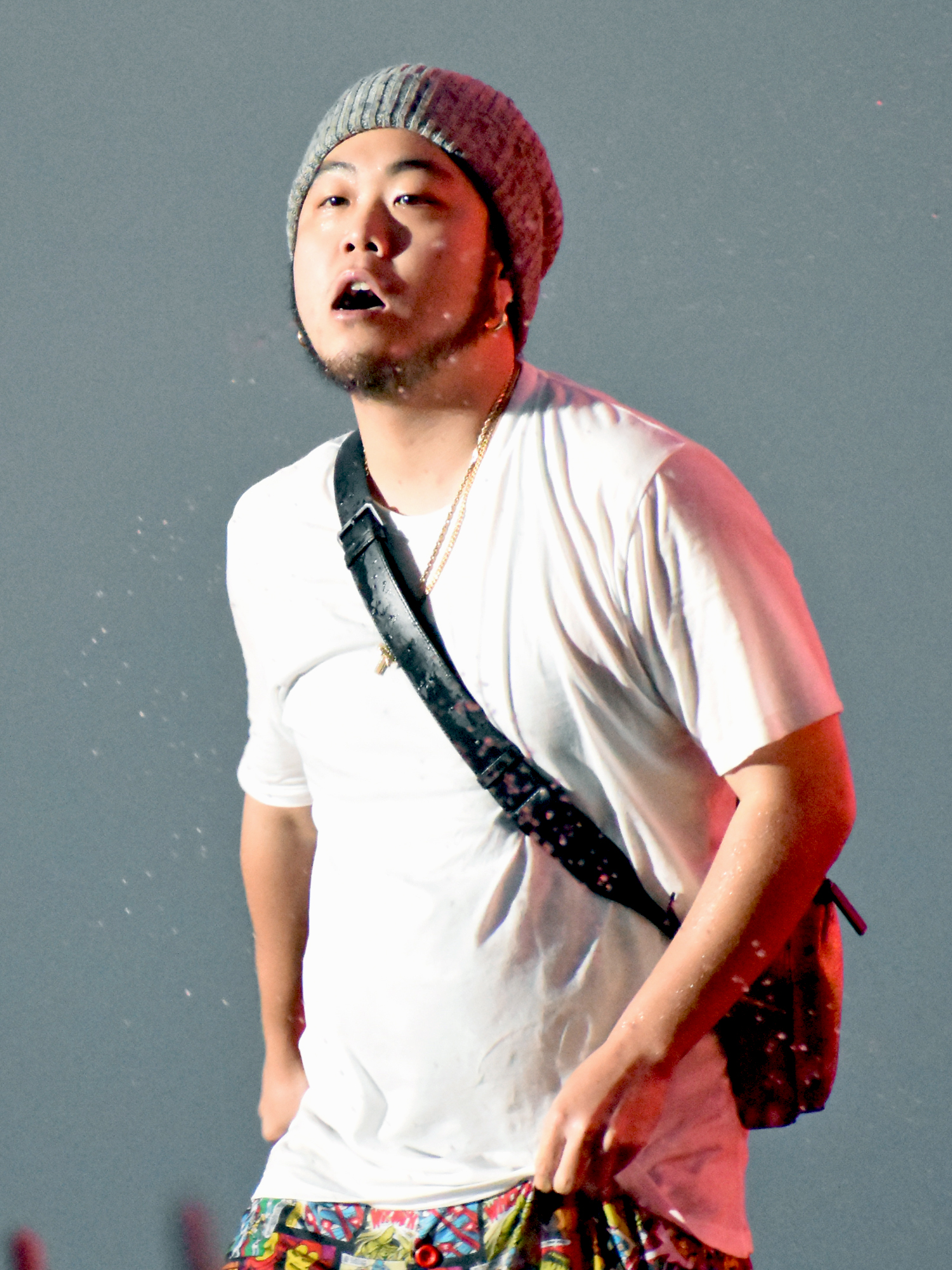
- G2 in 2018

Background information
- Born: Hwang G Two; May 1, 1992 (age 34); South Korea
- Origin: Lewisville, Texas
- Genre: Hip-hop
- Occupations: Rapper; singer
- Instrument: Vocals
- Years active: 2014–present
- Label: Hi-Lite Records
- Website: hiliterecords.com

- G2
- Hangul: 황지투
- RR: Hwang Jitu
- MR: Hwang Chit'u

Kevin Hwang (Korean: 케빈황; born May 1, 1992), also known by his Korean name Hwang Ji-tu (황지투) and better known by his stage name G2 (지투), is a Korean-American rapper and singer. He released his debut album, G2's Life, on March 30, 2017. He has also appeared on Show Me the Money 5 and Tribe of Hip Hop.

== Discography ==
=== Studio albums ===
Title	Album details	Peak chart positions	Sales
Title	Album details	KOR	Sales
G2's Life	Released: March 30, 2017; Label: Hi-Lite Records, CJ E&M; Formats: CD, digital download	56	—N/a
Throwing Up Butterflies	Released: December 7, 2018; Label: Hi-Lite Records, Interpark; Formats: CD, digital download	—	—N/a
Water	Released: August 17, 2020; Label: Stone Music Entertainment, Genie Music; Formats: CD, digital download	—	—N/a
"—" denotes releases that did not chart or were not released in that region.

=== Collaborative albums ===
Title	Album details
Project: Brainwash with Kid Ash	Released: January 22, 2014; Label: Make My Music, Luminant Entertainment; Formats: CD, digital download
Smiles and Tribulations with Junoflo	Released: July 30, 2021; Label: GLX, Woojo Entertainment; Formats: CD, digital download

=== Extended plays ===
Title	Album details	Peak chart positions	Sales
Title	Album details	KOR	Sales
G2`s Life, Pt. 1	Released: December 22, 2016; Label: Hi-Lite Records, CJ E&M; Formats: CD, digital download	—	—N/a
G2's Life, Pt. 2	Released: February 22, 2017; Label: Hi-Lite Records, CJ E&M; Formats: CD, digital download	—	—N/a
"—" denotes releases that did not chart.

=== Singles ===
Title	Year	Peak chart positions	Sales (DL)	Album
Title	Year	KOR	Sales (DL)	Album
As lead artist
"Hymn" (힘) feat. Don Mills	2015	—	—N/a	Non-album singles
"Shikgoo" (식구) feat. B-Free, Okasian, Reddy, Huckleberry P, Paloalto, Sway D, DJ Djanga	2015	—	—N/a	Non-album singles
"Paradise" feat. Sway D, Reddy	2016	—	—N/a	G2's Life
"We Are Young" (위하여) feat. Jessi	2016	—	—N/a	G2's Life
"1999" feat. Gray	2016	—	—N/a	G2's Life
"Young & Alive"	2016	—	—N/a	Entourage OST
"Knockin' at the Door"	2017	—	—N/a	G2's Life
"Growing Pains"	2017	—	—N/a	G2's Life
"Getaway"	2018	—	—N/a	Throwing Up Butterflies
"Drowning" feat. Owen	2020	—	—N/a	Water
"Outlawz" with Junoflo	2021	—	—N/a	Smiles and Tribulations
"X&OZ" with Junoflo	2021	—	—N/a	Smiles and Tribulations
"High Hopes" with Junoflo	2021	—	—N/a	Smiles and Tribulations
"Wanted" with Junoflo	2021	—	—N/a	Smiles and Tribulations
Collaborations
"999" with Kid Ash	2014	—	—N/a	Project: Brainwash
"I'm Not the Person You Used To Know" (니가 알던 내가 아냐) with Simon Dominic, One, BewhY	2016	2	KOR: 751,667+	Show Me the Money 5
"Goblin" (도깨비) with Flowsik, Hash Swan, Boi B, ₩uNo	2016	25	KOR: 120,785+	Show Me the Money 5
"Nightmare" with Yoon Do-hyun, Reddy, Inlayer, Johnny	2016	—	—N/a	SM Station
"Thank You" with Reddy feat. Dalchong of Cheeze	2016	—	—N/a	Non-album single
"Angel's Letter" with Kim Na-young	2017	—	—N/a	Sing for You OST
"Rapflicks" with Paloalto, Huckleberry P	2017	—	—N/a	Non-album single
"Break Bread" with Reddy, Sway D, Paloalto, YunB, Huckleberry P, Camo Starr	2018	—	—N/a	Break Bread
"Air" with Reddy, Sway D, Paloalto, YunB, Huckleberry P, Jowonu	2019	—	—N/a	#Air2019
"(Hi-Lite Sign) Remix" (한라산) with Sway D, YunB & Reddy	2019	—	—N/a	Non-album single
"—" denotes releases that did not chart.

=== Participation in albums ===
Title	Year	Album
"Homecoming" with Reddy, Sway D, Paloalto, YunB, Huckleberry P	2018	Break Bread
"Why" (왜) 24 FLAKKO (Xbf) feat. G2	2020	Transit #2
"Yezzir" with Reddy, Paloalto, Huckleberry P	2020	Legacy
"Savage" with Reddy, Illson	2020	Swag OST
