= Reddy (rapper) =

South Korean rapper and singer

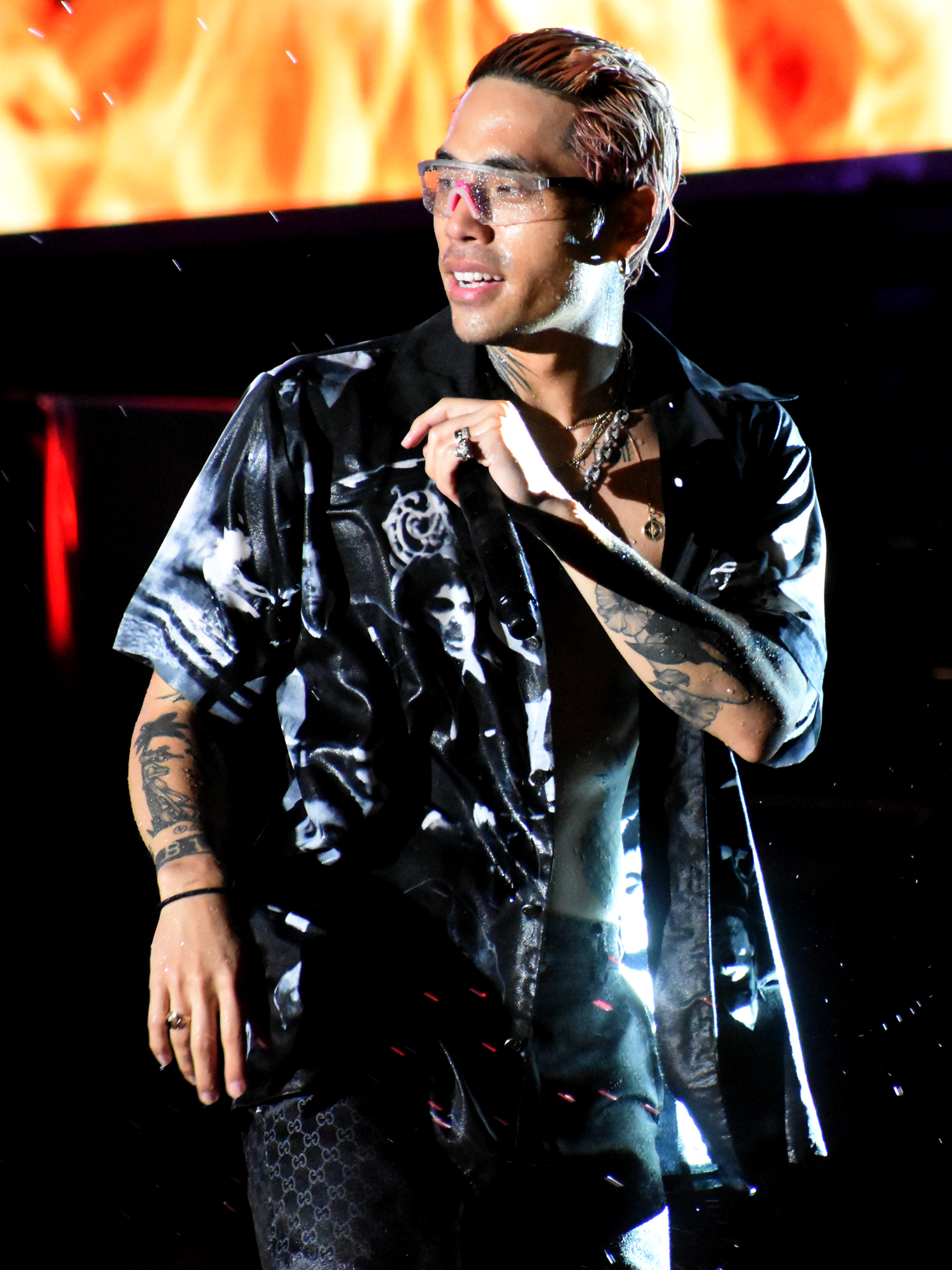
- Reddy at the Busan Sea Festival, August 2018

Background information
- Born: Kim Hong-woo; November 11, 1985 (age 41); South Korea
- Genres: Hip-hop; Rap
- Occupations: Rapper; singer
- Instrument: Vocals
- Years active: 2011–present
- Labels: Hi-Lite Records, 131
- Website: 131online.net/reddy

Korean name
- Hangul: 김홍우
- RR: Gim Hongu
- MR: Kim Hongu

Kim Hong-woo (Korean: 김홍우; born November 11, 1985), better known by his stage name Reddy (레디), is a South Korean rapper and singer. He released his debut single, "Capt. Reddy", on September 27, 2011. He has also appeared on Show Me the Money 5, Tribe of Hip Hop and High School Style Icon.

Following the dissolution of his former label, Hi-Lite Records, in April 2022, it was announced on September 30, 2022 that Reddy had signed with the record label 131 founded by B.I.

== Discography ==
=== Studio albums ===
Title	Album details	Peak chart positions	Sales
Title	Album details	KOR	Sales
Commitment	Released: August 29, 2013; Label: Genuine Music, CJ E&M; Formats: CD, digital download; Track listing: 1. "Welcome to My Show"; 2. "Feel It"; 3. "SE02L"; 4. "Different" (featuring B-Free); 5. "Gangbyeon Salja" (featuring Keith Ape); 6. "Keep Going" (featuring Paloalto & VEN); 7. "2:47"; 8. "Open My Eyes" (featuring Keith Ape); 9. "Pray"; 10. "Fresh I Am"; 11. "Distance"; 12. "Dear Mom"; 13. "Thank You"; 14. "Hello"	—	—N/a
Imaginary Foundation	Released: June 2, 2014; Label: Hi-Lite Records, CJ E&M; Formats: CD, digital download; Track listing: 1. "U Turn"; 2. "1985"; 3. "Just Do It"; 4. "Keep Your Pride"; 5. "Imaginary Foundation"; 6. "Stand"; 7. "Magic"; 8. "The Lite"	97	—N/a
Universe	Released: April 20, 2017; Label: Hi-Lite Records, CJ E&M; Formats: CD, digital download; Track listing: 1. "The New Birth" (featuring GSoul); 2. "Supreme"; 3. "Complicated" (featuring Killagramz); 4. "Moscato d'Asti" (featuring Chancellor); 5. "It's Alright" (featuring G2); 6. "Do My Thing" (featuring Cheetah & Paloalto); 7. "My Lite" (featuring A.C.T.); 8. "Amazing"	67	—N/a
Telescope	Released: April 12, 2018; Label: Hi-Lite Records, Interpark; Formats: CD, digital download; Track listing: 1. "Come Over"; 2. "Turkey" (featuring Year of the Ox); 3. "Flu"; 4. "Thanksgiving" (featuring Paloalto & Huckleberry P); 5. "Tracksuit" (featuring Sway D); 6. "UGP Interlude" (featuring G2); 7. "Check-In" (featuring Samuel Seo); 8. "Peach" (featuring Suran); 9. "Life" (featuring Horim); 10. "Bliss"; 11. "Flamingo" (featuring Gaeko)	78	—N/a
500000	Released: May 17, 2020; Label: Hi-Lite Records, Interpark; Formats: CD, digital download; Track listing: 1. "500000"; 2. "Buried Alive"; 3. "Humantree (Skit)"; 4. "Hmmm"; 5. "Do Better"; 6. "Teenage Shopper (Interlude)"; 7. "I Was a Boom Bap Kid"; 8. "The Surface"; 9. "Cheat Code"; 10. "Baby Driver"; 11. "No Worries"; 12. "Fade Out"	—	—N/a
"—" denotes releases that did not chart.

=== Extended plays ===
Title	Album details	Peak chart positions	Sales
Title	Album details	KOR	Sales
eightyfivesoul with Year of the Ox	Collaboration album; Released: October 5, 2018; Label: Hi-Lite Records, Interpark; Formats: CD, digital download; Track listing: 1. "No More Parties"; 2. "Knock Knock"; 3. "Do It" (featuring G2); 4. "Take It Slow"	—	—N/a
Reddy Action	Released: October 13, 2022; Label: 131, Dreamus; Formats: CD, digital download; Track listing: 1. "Ready"; 2. "A Doom"; 3. "Say U Wanna"; 4. "Chicken Dinna"; 5. "Under the Tree"; 6. "Reddy is the New Black"	—	—N/a
"—" denotes releases that did not chart.

=== Singles ===
==== As lead artist ====
Title	Year	Peak chart positions	Sales (DL)	Album
Title	Year	KOR	Sales (DL)	Album
"Capt. Reddy"	2011	—	—N/a	Non-album singles
"Let's Go" feat. Satbyeol	2012	—	—N/a	Non-album singles
"Another Night" feat. Lazy Kuma	2012	—	—N/a	Non-album singles
"Se02l"	2013	—	—N/a	Commitment
"Gangbyeon Salja" (강변살자; lit. 'riverside life') feat. Kid Ash	2013	—	—N/a	Commitment
"Keep Going" (행진; lit. 'March') feat. Paloalto & Ven	2013	—	—N/a	Commitment
"1985"	2014	—	—N/a	Imaginary Foundation
"Magic" (마술)	2014	—	—N/a	Imaginary Foundation
"Stand" (서있어)	2014	—	—N/a	Imaginary Foundation
"Chi Kwon" (취권; lit. 'drunken master') feat. Brandun DeShay	2015	—	—N/a	Non-album singles
"Think" (생각해) feat. Jay Park	2016	98	KOR: 24,700	Non-album singles
"Like This" feat. Bobby	2016	20	KOR: 166,038	Show Me the Money 5
"Ocean View"	2016	— (Note: "Ocean View" did not enter the Digital Chart, but appeared at number 91 on the component Download chart.)	KOR: 19,244	Non-album singles
"Blaze of Glory"	2016	—	—N/a	Non-album singles
"Even If It's You" (너라도) feat. Kim Boa of Spica	2016	—	—N/a	Entourage OST
"My Lite" feat. A.C.T.	2017	—	—N/a	Universe
"Supreme"	2017	—	—N/a	Universe
"Enjoy" (즐겨) feat. Chancellor	2017	—	—N/a	Non-album single
"Thanksgiving" (적셔) feat. Paloalto & Huckleberry P	2018	—	—N/a	Telescope
"Peach" feat. Suran	2018	—	—N/a	Telescope
"Stand by You" (Note: In addition to the original song, a Japanese version featuring Sky-Hi was released on December 14, 2018, and a collection of remixes, Stand by You Remixes, was released on January 5, 2019.)	2018	—	—N/a	Non-album singles
"Dress Code"	2019	—	—N/a	Non-album singles
"Vroom"	2019	—	—N/a	Non-album singles
"500000"	2020	—	—N/a	500000
"Buried Alive"	2020	—	—N/a	500000
"Humantree (Skit)"	2020	—	—N/a	500000
"Hmmm"	2020	—	—N/a	500000
"Do Better" (두 배로)	2020	—	—N/a	500000
"Teenage Shopper (Interlude)"	2020	—	—N/a	500000
"I Was a Boom Bap Kid" (Note: In addition to the original song, a remix featuring YDG was released on October 25, 2020.)	2020	—	—N/a	500000
"The Surface" (수면 위)	2020	—	—N/a	500000
"Cheat Code" (치트키)	2020	—	—N/a	500000
"Baby Driver"	2020	—	—N/a	500000
"No Worries"	2020	—	—N/a	500000
"Fade Out"	2020	—	—N/a	500000
"Too Busy" (바뻐)	2021	—	—N/a	Non-album singles
"Ceremony" feat. Big Naughty	2022	—	—N/a	Non-album singles
"Chicken Dinna"	2022	—	—N/a	Reddy Action
"Tap Tap Tap" feat. Bobby	2023	—	—N/a	Non-album singles
"Take Back" feat. Lil Cherry & Goldbuuda	2023	—	—N/a	Non-album singles
"Hippeh" feat. Mirani	2023	—	—N/a	Non-album singles
"I'm Up"	2024	—	—N/a	Non-album singles
"—" denotes releases that did not chart.

==== Collaborations ====
Title	Year	Peak chart positions	Sales (DL)	Album
Title	Year	KOR	Sales (DL)	Album
"Work" with B-Free	2013	—	—N/a	Hi-Life
"What We Do II" with Evo, Huckleberry P, Okasian, Paloalto, B-Free & Soul One	2013	—	—N/a	Hi-Life
"Bad Tooth" (충치; lit. 'cavity') with B-Free, Okasian & Paloalto	2013	—	—N/a	Non-album single
"New Seoul" with Okasian & Kid Ash	2013	—	—N/a	Orca-Tape
"I Wish" with B-Free	2014	—	—N/a	Non-album singles
"The Answer" with B-Free	2015	—	—N/a	Non-album singles
"Love Last Forever" with B-Free feat. Coke Jazz	2015	—	—N/a	Non-album singles
"$insa" (신사) with C Jamm & Xitsuh feat. Zion.T	2016	4	KOR: 493,535	Show Me the Money 5
"Wanted" with C Jamm	2016	13	KOR: 225,904	Show Me the Money 5
"Nightmare" with Yoon Do-hyun, G2, Inlayer & Johnny	2016	—	—N/a	SM Station
"Thank You" with G2 feat. Dalchong of Cheeze	2016	—	—N/a	Non-album single
"Complicated" with Kim Boa of Spica	2017	—	—N/a	Hip Hop Tribe 2
"Break Bread" with Paloalto, Sway D, YunB, G2, Huckleberry P & Camo Starr	2018	—	—N/a	Break Bread
"No More Parties" with Year of the Ox	2018	—	—N/a	eightyfivesoul
"Knock Knock" with Year of the Ox	2018	—	—N/a	eightyfivesoul
"Air" with Paloalto, Sway D, G2, YunB, Huckleberry P & Jowonu	2019	—	—N/a	#Air2019
"Hi-Lite Sign (Remix)" (한라산) with G2, Sway D, YunB	2019	—	—N/a	Non-album single
"Kid Rock" with Paloalto, jerd & Soovi	2020	—	—N/a	Legacy
"Automatic (Hi-Mix)" with Sway D, Paloalto & Chancellor	2020	—	—N/a	Non-album singles
"Tag" with Swervy	2021	—	—N/a	Non-album singles
"Yuppie" as part of Heartcore (with Swervy, Yosi, Sui)	2021	—	—N/a	Heartcore
"60 BPM" as part of Heartcore (with Swervy, Yosi, Sui)	2021	—	—N/a	Heartcore
"Film" with Une	2021	—	—N/a	Non-album single
"Rodeo" (압구정 로데오) with Gemini	2022	—	—N/a	Listen-Up Ep.8
"TTM" with B.I & Sik-K	2023	—	—N/a	Non-album single
"—" denotes releases that did not chart.
