= Swervy =

South Korean rapper (born 2001)

Swervy 스월비
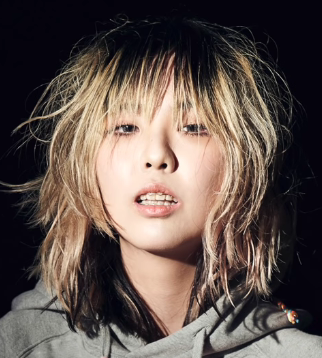
- Swervy in 2019

Background information
- Born: Shin Yu-bin; December 25, 2001 (age 24)
- Genres: Hip hop
- Occupation: Rapper
- Years active: 2017-present
- Label: Hi-Lite Records

Shin Yu-bin (Korean: 신유빈; born December 25, 2001), known professionally as Swervy (Korean: 스월비), is a South Korean rapper and songwriter. In 2021, she became the first female musician to win Best Rap Song at the Korean Music Awards with "Mama Lisa".

== Early life ==
Shin Yu-bin was studying in Russia when she was 12. She realized her talent in rapping when she sang along to Young Money's songs in the school festival. She then decided to be a rapper. She became interested in Korean hip hop after Swings called out fellow rappers on the beat of "Control". She took rap lessons from rapper JJK. She was influenced by Green Day, My Chemical Romance, and Panic! at the Disco. She adopted the stage name "Swervy" because she wanted to live without doing what she did not want to do.

== Career ==
In 2017, Swervy released her debut single "Yaya" with rapper Eco Yard. In 2019, she signed to Hi-Lite Records. In 2020, she released her debut studio album Undercover Angel, which received critical acclaim. In 2021, she became the first female musician to win Best Rap Song at the Korean Music Awards with "Mama Lisa".

== Philanthropy ==
In 2022, Swervy donated 100 thousand masks to three children's centers.

== Personal life ==
Swervy is genderqueer and has no pronoun preference.

== Discography ==
=== Studio album ===
Title	Details	Peak chart position
Title	Details	KOR
Bunny Bullet	Released: January 17, 2018; Label: Team Yaya; Format: digital download	--
Undercover Angel	Released: May 24, 2020; Label: Hi-Lite Records; Format: CD, digital download	34

== Filmography ==
=== TV ===
Year	Title	Role	Ref.
2018	Show Me the Money 777	Contestant	
2020	Show Me the Money 8	Contestant	

== Awards and nominations ==
Award	Year	Nominee	Category	Result	Ref.
Korean Music Awards	2021	"Mama Lisa"	Best Rap Song	Won	
Korean Hip-hop Awards	2021	Herself	New Artist of the Year	Nominated	
