= Okasian =

Korean-American rapper and singer

Okasian 김지용
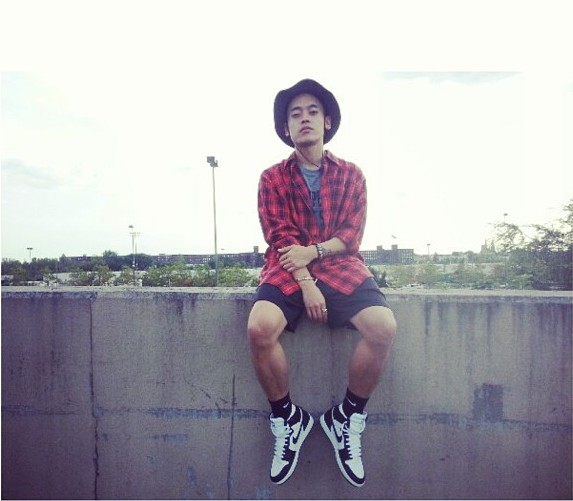
- Okasian in 2013

Background information
- Also known as: Alexander Kim
- Born: Kim Ji-yong; March 11, 1987 (age 39); Los Angeles, California, United States
- Genre: Hip-hop
- Occupations: Rapper; singer
- Instrument: Vocals
- Years active: 2011–present
- Label: The Black Label

- Okasian
- Hangul: 김지용
- RR: Gim Jiyong
- MR: Kim Chiyong

Kim Ji-yong (Korean: 김지용; also known as Alexander Kim; born March 11, 1987), better known by his stage name Okasian (오케이션), is a Korean-American rapper and singer. He graduated with a degree in biology from Pennsylvania State University. He released his debut album, Boarding Procedures, on December 6, 2012. In May 2017, Okasian joined YG Entertainment's sub-label, The Black Label.

== Discography ==
=== Studio albums ===
Title	Album details	Peak chart positions	Sales
Title	Album details	KOR	Sales
Boarding Procedures	Released: December 6, 2012; Label: Hi-Lite Records, CJ E&M; Formats: CD, digital download	—	—N/a
"—" denotes releases that did not chart.

=== Mixtapes ===
Title	Album details
Preseason#1	Released: 2010
Preseason#2	Released: 2011; Label: Hi-Lite Records
Dis//connect with Bryan Chase, B-Free	Released: 2017; Label: The Black Label; Formats: SoundCloud

=== Singles ===
Title	Year	Peak chart positions	Sales (DL)	Album
Title	Year	KOR	Sales (DL)	Album
As lead artist
"You're The One" feat. Evo	2011	—	—N/a	Non-album singles
"Reddy on Any Okasian" feat. Reddy	2012	—	—N/a	Non-album singles
"Good Night"	2012	—	—N/a	Boarding Procedures
"On My Way" (가는길이야) feat. Kid Ash	2012	—	—N/a	Boarding Procedures
"Can't Stop" (막지못해)	2012	—	—N/a	Boarding Procedures
"Spread the Word" (소문내)	2012	—	—N/a	Boarding Procedures
"Pshh"	2013	—	—N/a	Non-album singles
"Damn Thing Funny" feat. Paloalto	2014	—	—N/a	Non-album singles
"Fashionably Late"	2014	—	—N/a	Non-album singles
"Genius"	2014	—	—N/a	Non-album singles
"Get That Money"	2014	—	—N/a	Non-album singles
Collaborations
"Survive" (살아남아) with Paloalto & B-Free	2013	—	—N/a	Non-album singles
"Cavity" (충치) with B-Free, Paloalto & Reddy	2013	—	—N/a	Non-album singles
"—" denotes releases that did not chart.

== Awards and nominations ==
Year	Awards	Category	Recipient	Result	Ref.
2017	Korean Hip-Hop Awards	Best Collaboration	"₩ 1,000,000" feat. G-Dragon, BewhY and CL	Nominated	
