= Paloalto (rapper) =

South Korean rapper and singer

Paloalto 전상현
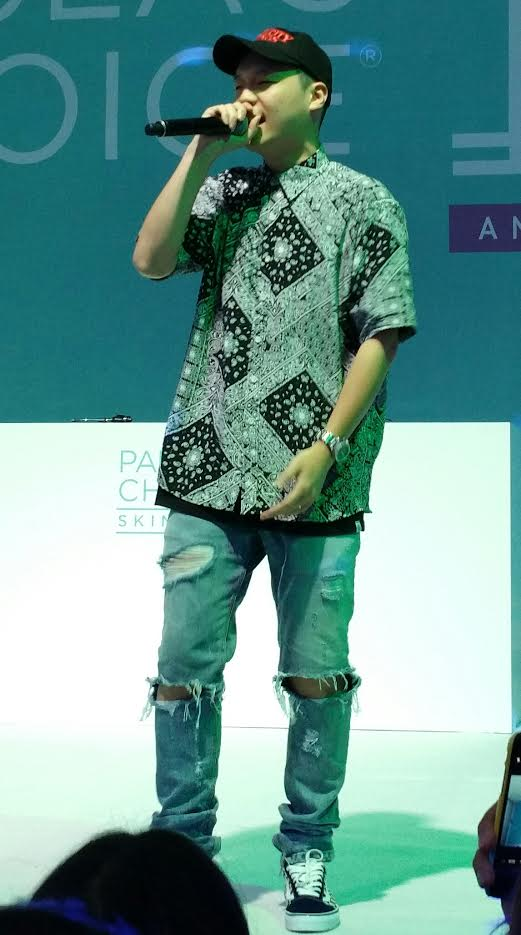
- Paloalto performing in Seoul, June 22, 2017

Background information
- Born: Jeon Sang-hyun; January 24, 1984 (age 42); South Korea
- Genres: Hip-hop; Rap
- Occupations: Rapper; singer
- Instrument: Vocals
- Years active: 2002–present
- Labels: Hi-Lite Records; Daytona Entertainment
- Website: hiliterecords.com

Korean name
- Hangul: 전상현
- RR: Jeon Sanghyeon
- MR: Chŏn Sanghyŏn

Jeon Sang-hyun (Korean: 전상현; born January 24, 1984), better known by his stage name Paloalto (팔로알토), is a South Korean rapper and singer. He is the founder of Hi-Lite Records. He has also appeared on Show Me the Money 4, Show Me the Money 777, Show Me the Money 9, and Tribe of Hip Hop.

== Discography ==
=== Studio albums ===
Title	Album details	Peak chart positions
Title	Album details	KOR
Resoundin'	Released: June 20, 2005; Label: Will Records; Formats: CD, digital download	—
Daily Routine	Released: November 9, 2010; Label: Hi-Lite Records, CJ E&M; Formats: CD, digital download	10
Eve (전야제)	Released: December 29, 2011; Label: Hi-Lite Records, CJ E&M; Formats: CD, digital download	—
Chief Life	Released: November 25, 2013; Label: Hi-Lite Records, CJ E&M; Formats: CD, digital download	—
Summer Grooves	Released: July 27, 2018; Label: Hi-Lite Records, Interpark; Formats: CD, digital download	—
Love, Money & Dreams: The Album	Released: September 29, 2019; Label: Hi-Lite Records, Interpark; Formats: CD, digital download	—
"—" denotes releases that did not chart.

=== Collaborative albums ===
Title	Album details	Peak chart positions
Title	Album details	KOR
Behind the Scenes (with Evo)	Released: July 26, 2012; Label: Hi-Lite Records, CJ E&M; Formats: CD, digital download	—
4 the Youth (with Justhis)	Released: March 7, 2018; Label: Hi-Lite Records, Interpark; Formats: CD, digital download	31

=== Extended plays ===
Title	Album details	Peak chart positions
Title	Album details	KOR
Footprints	Released: February 2, 2004; Label: Will Records; Formats: CD, digital download	—
Lonely Hearts	Released: April 20, 2010; Label: Hi-Lite Records, CJ E&M; Formats: CD, digital download	5
Fever For Calmness	Released: June 8, 2011; Label: Hi-Lite Records, CJ E&M; Formats: CD, digital download	—
Cheers	Released: September 23, 2014; Label: Hi-Lite Records, CJ E&M; Formats: CD, digital download	—
Victories	Released: October 27, 2016; Label: Hi-Lite Records, CJ E&M; Formats: CD, digital download	—
Yearend: Song Gu Young Shin (Yearend: 송구영신)	Released: December 21, 2018; Label: Hi-Lite Records, Interpark; Formats: CD, digital download	—
"—" denotes releases that did not chart.

=== Singles ===
Title	Year	Peak chart positions	Sales	Album
Title	Year	KOR	Sales	Album
"I Feel Love" (feat. Soul One)	2005	—		Resoundin'
"Positive Vibes" (feat. Yoon Mi-rae)	2010	77		Lonely Hearts
"Dreamer" (feat. Bumkey)	2010	—		Daily Routine
"I Feel Love" (feat. Koonta)	2011	—		Non-album single
"Would You Be My" (feat. Beenzino)	2011	—		Fever For Calmness
"After This Night" (이 밤이 지나고 나면) (feat. 211)	2011	53	KOR: 97,478	Non-album single
"Celebration" (feat. Dok2)	2011	—		Eve
"Au Revoir" (또봐)	2013	—		Chief Life
"Good Times" (feat. Babylon)	2014	—		Cheers
"Turtle Ship Remix" (거북선 Remix) (feat. G2, B-Free, Okasian & Zico)	2015	23	KOR: 110,041	Non-album singles
"Fancy" (feat. Dean & Sway D)	2016	—	KOR: 15,967	Non-album singles
"Victories"	2016	—		Victories
"Escape"	2017	—		Non-album single
"Pina Colada" (피나콜라다) (feat. Owell Mood, OLNL)	2018	—		Summer Grooves
"Fuck It"	2018	—		YEAREND: Song Gu Young Shin
"Get It"	2019	—		Love, Money & Dreams: The Album
"It Ain’t Love" (사랑이 아냐)	2019	—		Love, Money & Dreams: The Album
"Move On"	2019	—		Love, Money & Dreams: The Album
"The Greatest, Part 2" (feat. Los, Changmo & Owell Mood)	2019	—		Love, Money & Dreams: The Album
"Grind"	2019	—		Love, Money & Dreams: The Album
"Sentimental" (센치해) (feat. Swervy)	2019	—		Non-album single
"LM&D (Bonus Track)"	2020	—		Love, Money & Dreams: The Remixes
"Let the Story Begin"	2020	—		Non-album singles
"Energy"	2020	—		Non-album singles
"Who Gon' Win" (FIFA Online 4 promotional song)	2022			Non-album singles
"—" denotes releases that did not chart.

=== Collaborations ===
Title	Year	Peak chart positions	Sales	Album
Title	Year	KOR	Sales	Album
"Stand Up" (with Myunghee)	2011	—	—N/a	Non-album singles
"Baby" (with Soul One)	2011	—	—N/a	Non-album singles
"Day n Night" (with EachONE)	2011	—	—N/a	Fever For Calmness
"Cinderella" (with All That)	2011	—	—N/a	Non-album singles
"Don't Do This" (이러지마) (with Soul One feat. Okasian)	2011	—	—N/a	Non-album singles
"Seoul" (서울) (with Evo)	2012	—	—N/a	Behind The Scenes
"Do It Like Us" (with Evo)	2012	—	—N/a	Behind The Scenes
"Survive" (살아남아) (with B-Free & Okasian)	2013	—	—N/a	Non-album singles
"Cavity" (충치) (with B-Free, Okasian & Reddy)	2013	—	—N/a	Non-album singles
"The One & Only" (with Huckleberry P)	2013	—	—N/a	Non-album singles
"Moneyflow" (다 비켜봐) (with Mino & Zico)	2015	7	KOR: 362,442	Show Me the Money 4
"Dark Panda" (다크팬더) (with Hyolyn & Zico)	2015	39	KOR: 72,699	Non-album single
"Cooler Than the Cool" (with Justhis feat. Huckleberry P)	2017	—	—N/a	4 the Youth
"Rapflicks" (with G2, Huckleberry P)	2017	—	—N/a	Non-album single
"Brown Eyes View" (with Justhis feat. CIFIKA)	2017	—	—N/a	4 the Youth
"Break Bread " (with Reddy, Sway D, YunB, G2, Huckleberry P & Camo Starr)	2018	—	—N/a	Break Bread
"Switch" (with Justhis feat. CIFIKA)	2018	—	—N/a	4 the Youth
"Two Dawgz and The Ape" (with TeddyLoid & Salu)	2018	—	—N/a	SILENT PLANET: RELOADED
"Air" (아마두) (with Reddy, Sway D, G2, YunB, Huckleberry P & Jowonu)	2019	—	—N/a	#Air2019
"Hi-Lite Sign (Prod. by Yosi)" (한라산) (with Swervy, Jowonu, Huckleberry P)	2019	— (Note: "Hi-Lite Sign" did not enter the Gaon Digital Chart, but appeared at number 177 on the component Gaon Download Chart.)	—N/a	Dingo X Hi-Lite Records
"Forever 84" (with Yumdda, Deepflow, The Quiett, Simon Dominic)	2019	94	—N/a	Dingo X DAMOIM (Part 1)
"I'mma Do" (아마두) (with Yumdda, Deepflow, The Quiett, Simon Dominic, feat. Woo Won-jae, Keem Hyo-eun, Nucksal, Huckleberry P)	2019	2	—N/a	Dingo X DAMOIM (Part 2)
"The 8th grade syndrome" (중2병) (with Yumdda, Deepflow, The Quiett, Simon Dominic)	2019	69	—N/a	Dingo X DAMOIM (Part 3)
"Run" (아마두) (with Yumdda, Deepflow, The Quiett, Simon Dominic)	2020	54	—N/a	Dingo X DAMOIM (Part 4)
"THEY say" (with Bully Da Ba$tard)	2020	—	—N/a	Non-album single
"Happy Call" (with Urban Zakapa, Hash Swan & Dbo)	2020	—	—N/a	GANG Project
"Fadeaway" (with Jvcki Wai, Coogie, The Quiett & Bassagong)	2020	158	—N/a	Non-album single
"Kid Rock" (with jerd, Reddy & Soovi)	2020	—	—N/a	Legacy
"Automatic (Hi-Mix)" (with Reddy, Sway D & Chancellor)	2020	—	—N/a	Non-album single
"STARS" (with Kidd King, xs, Sycho, Bruno Champman, ChaMane, Jubittrain & Killagramz)	2020	—	—N/a	ON A!R PROJECT Part. 1 STARS
"Grand Master Theory" (with Young Soul)	2021	—	—N/a	Palo Got Young Soul
"Unsung Heroes (Prod.SUMIN)" (with Khundi Panda & SUMIN)	2021	—	—N/a	Non-album single
"4 the Youth Freestyle" (with Justhis)	2021	— (Note: "4 the Youth Freestyle" did not enter the Gaon Digital Chart, but appeared at number 114 on the component Gaon Download Chart, with the b-sides "잠궈 (Lock Up) Remix (feat. Swervy, Kid Milli, DON MALIK & Reddy)" and "Wayne Remix (feat. G2, Huckleberry P & P-TYPE)" appearing as number 185 and 184 on Download charts, respectively.)	—N/a	4 the Youth Freestyle & Remixes
"Mungpal" (멍멍팔팔) (with PH-1)	2021	—	—N/a	Non-album singles
"No Ex (Prod. SOMDEF)" (with Giriboy)	2021	— (Note: "No Ex" did not enter the Gaon Digital Chart, but appeared at number 160 on the component Gaon Download Chart.)	—N/a	Non-album singles
"—" denotes releases that did not chart.

== Filmography ==
=== Television shows ===
Year	Title	Role	Ref.
2022	Listen-Up	Regular Member	
