= Hi-Lite Records =

- Parent company: Stone Music Entertainment (CJ ENM E&M Division)
- Founded: April 20, 2010
- Founder: Paloalto
- Defunct: April 20, 2022
- Distributors: Genie Music; Stone Music Entertainment
- Genre: Korean Hip hop
- Location: Seoul, South Korea
- Official website: hiliterecords.com

Hi-Lite Records was a South Korean independent record label founded in 2010 by rapper Paloalto.

== Partnership with CJ E&M ==
It was announced in October 2015 that the entertainment company CJ E&M would be acquiring the label. Representatives stated the company would provide the label assistance in funding, marketing and expanding a global network, allowing it to solely focus on music.

== Accolades ==
- Won both "Album of the Year" (Hi-Life) and "Label of the Year" in the 2013 hiphopplaya awards.
- Won "Song of the Year" and "Music Video of the Year" with Keith Ape's "It G Ma" in the 2015 hiphopplaya awards

== Artists ==
- Paloalto (Founder and Former CEO)
- Pinodyne (Huckleberry P & Soul Fish)
- Reddy
- Soul One
- Camo Starr (CEO)
- Beshade
- Swervy
- Soovi
- Jerd

== Former ==
- Evo
- DJ Djanga
- GLV
- TKO
- DJ Frekeey
- Bella
- Keith Ape
- 211
- B-Free (left 7 May 2016)
- Okasian (left 27 May 2016)
- G2
- YunB
- Jowonu
- Sway D

== Discography ==
- HI-LITE Records - HI-LIFE (2013)
- The Cohort – Orca-Tape (2013)
