= Park Sae-byul =

South Korean musician (born 1985)

Park Saebyul
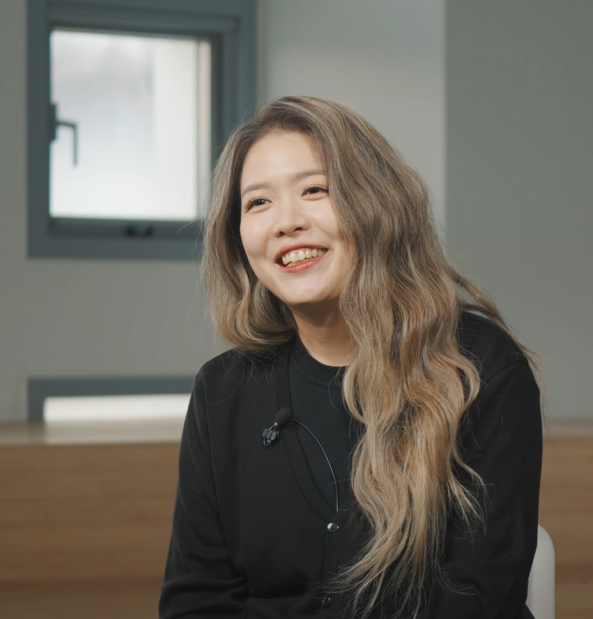
- Park Sae-byul in 2025

Background information
- Born: October 24, 1985 (age 40)
- Origin: Seoul, South Korea
- Genres: K-pop; R&B; Soul; Jazz; Ballad; Bossa Nova
- Occupations: Singer-songwriter, Musician, Producer, Lecturer
- Years active: 2006–present
- Label: Antenna Music (2006~Present)
- Website: https://www.antenna.co.kr/ParkSaeByul
- Spouse: Unknown (m. 2020)
- Children: 2

Korean name
- Hangul: 박새별
- RR: Bak Saebyeol
- MR: Pak Saebyŏl

Park Sae-byul (Korean: 박새별; born October 24, 1985) is a South Korean indie composer and singer-songwriter.

== Early life ==
Park Sae-byul was born in Seoul and graduated from Yonsei University with a major in psychology and later received both a master's and doctorate degree from KAIST, where she studied Artificial Intelligence with focus on music analysis.

She grew up in a musical family: her mother majored in composition and her older sister is a pianist. Despite this background, Park did not receive formal training in musical training and only began pursuing music during her early years in college.

== Career ==
In 2006, Park began her music career after submitting and performing demo recordings at a management company. She was noticed by Yoo Hee-yeol, who ran the agency Toy Music (now Antenna). Prior to her debut, Park taught herself MIDI production and wrote songs while also working as a keyboard session musician for stage performances and albums by Lucid Fall, Epik High, and Toy. On October 15, 2008, Park released her debut extended play (EP), Diary. She made her official debut as a solo artist three days later, on October 18, at the 2008 Grand Mint Festival.

On March 19, 2009, Park participated in the compilation album 남과 여…그리고 이야기 (Man and Woman... and Story), which featured 14 songs performed by 28 male and female artists from Korea and abroad. Park collaborated with Lee Han-cheol on the song “바야흐로 사랑의 계절” (“Now Is the Season of Love”), which was included in the album. In June 2009, Park began working as a host for MBCnet’s Culture Concert Nanjang, a program featuring live music performances, particularly by indie bands.

In March 2010, she released her first full-length album, 새벽별 (Morning Star), which she wrote and produced herself. From March 23 to 25, she also participated in her agency’s first label concert, Antenna Music Big Disappointment Show, alongside Yoo Hee-yeol, Jung Jae-hyung, Lucid Fall, and Peppertones. On August 28, 2010, Park held her first solo concert, 한여름 밤의 꿈 (A Midsummer Night’s Dream), which sold out. Later that year, from December 10 to 12, she held a year-end concert titled A Midsummer Night’s Star 2010.

From April 15 to 17, 2011, Park once again performed with her labelmates in the concert Antenna Music Warriors. She was also invited to work as a radio DJ, hosting 아름다운 동요세상 (Beautiful World of Children’s Songs) on the educational channel EBS from March 6, 2011, to February 28, 2012. On May 28, 2011, she reunited with her labelmates for an encore concert titled Always, Us Together.

Park Sae-byul also contributed singing voices for Korean-language dubs of several Disney films. In 2007, she provided the singing voice of Giselle in the Korean dubbing of Enchanted. In 2009, she performed the Korean version of the inserted song “Barking at the Moon” for Disney’s Bolt. The same year, she sang the Korean version of the ending song “Gift of a Friend” for Tinker Bell and the Lost Treasure. In 2011, she provided the singing voice of Rapunzel in the Korean dubbing of Tangled, performing all of the songs except “Healing Incantation”.

In 2012, she entered the Graduate School of Culture Technology at Korea Advanced Institute of Science and Technology (KAIST). On October 12, 2012, Sae-byul participated in the Busan Cultural Center’s planned performance The Concert Under the Sky, marking her first solo performance in Busan.

On May 28, 2013, Park Sae-byul released her second full-length album, High Heels, which she wrote, composed, and arranged herself. The album consists of nine tracks, including the title song “If Love Makes Us Meet Again”. On October 25 to 26, Sae-byul held a solo concert titled Star of an Autumn Night 2013.

In 2014, Sae-byul became part of the guest judge panel for K-pop Star 4 representing Antenna Music. In the same year, she sang for the Korean dubbing of Tinker Bell and the Legend of the NeverBeast. On June 11, Sae-byul took part in composing an OST for SBS series 'You're All Surrounded' titled 'I Only See You' sang by Kwon Jinah.

On June 5, 2015 she released her single 'Sky High' with DJ Duo 라이크라익스와(Like Likes) featuring Young K. On June 20 to 21, Sae-byul was part of the lineup for Rainbow Island 2015 Music & Camping, a festival promoting the concept of music, camping, and recreation. On October 10, she became a panelist for a variety science talk show '2015 Science Talk Talk in Gwangju' hosted by the Ministry of Science, ICT and Future Planning organized by the Korea Foundation for the Advancement of Science and Creativity. On November 28, a similar variety talk show '2015 Science Talk Talk in Busan' was conducted where Sae-byul was once more a panelist.

On September 23 to 25, 2016, Sae-byul (now part of the seniors of the company), joins her labelmates alongside the agency's new and junior artists Sam Kim, Kwon Jinah, Jung Seunghwan and Lee Jinah for a label concert called 'Hello, Antenna'. On November 29, Antenna debuted their artist Jung Seung-hwan with a debut song 'The Fool' composed by Park Sae-byul which swept the charts to reach No.1.

On August 11, 2017 Sae-byul joined her labelmates in a Naver V Live 'Antenna 101' broadcast showcasing the agency's artists talents parodying the 'Produce 101' show. In September, Sae-byul joined another label concert named 'With, Antenna' covering five cities of Korea and the US.

On February 19, Sae-byul helped compose and write the song 'Timeline' (타임라인) for Jung Seunghwan's album 'Spring Again' (그리고 봄). On October 25, 2018, Sae-byul took part in composing singer Lyn's title track 'Temperature of Parting' for her 10th album called '#10'.

On February 19, 2019, Sae-byul became the singer for the OST Part 4 of the drama 'What's Wrong with Secretary Kim' titled 'A Love That Hurts Too Much Was Not Love'. On October 31, she released her third full-length album 'Ballades Op.3' containing a total of 10 ballads that she wrote, composed, arranged, and sang herself.

On January 2, 2020, Sae-byul was featured in tvN's program 'Problematic Men: Brain Troupe'. On January 11, Park Sae-byul married a non-celebrity husband, a KAIST graduate and businessman. On February 15, Sae-byul composed OSTs for a web series 'Ending Again' with songs 'Someday', 'Next to You', and 'My Turn' sang by Park Won. From February 22 to 23, Sae-byul had her solo concert after 7 years called 'Star of a Midwinter Night'. From March 11 to 12 and 18 to 19, Antenna held an online live relay performance called 'Everything is OK with Antenna' in response to the ongoing COVID-19 pandemic in which Sae-byul participated. On May 6, EBS announced Sae-byul's participation on 'Ding Dong Daeng Kindergarten' as a teacher of nursery rhymes to children. On December 20, Sae-byul joined her labelmates on their first company Christmas carol called 'Our Winter'.

On May 14, 2021, Sae-byul posted in her Instagram that gave birth to a son named Kim Lee Jun. On July 29, Sae-byul took part in an album project called 'Mother's Song Vol. 1' with the track 'Your Day and Night' featuring mother artists active in Korean music industry and their stories with child-rearing during the pandemic. In October, Sae-byul joined her labelmates on a project show produced by Kakao Entertainment called 'Dereumi TV: Udangtangtang Antenna'(Clumsy Antenna). On December 1, Sae-byul joined her labelmates in releasing their second company Christmas carol 'See You Here Next Winter'.

On January 7, 2022, Sae-byul was featured in MBC's show 'Docuplex - Music Mentionary Mother' (다큐플렉스 - 뮤직멘터리 마더).

Sae-byul has also been active in teaching at Beakseok University's Music Department (since 2017), Hongik University (since 2020) and at Yonsei University's Underwood International Studies Department (Since 2022).

On February 17, 2023, Sae-byul finished her master's and doctorate degree by studying Artificial Intelligence in analyzing music at KAIST after 10 years. On May 2, Sae-byul gave birth to a daughter named Kim Lee-seo. On June 28, Sae-byul returned to her alma mater at KAIST for a performance and feature in an event called 'Innovate Korea 2023' hosted by Herald Economy. On October 24, Sae-byul released her EP 'Everblooming' in celebration of her 15th debut anniversary presenting music filled with her warm love of her children. This album also included a collaborative song called 'Fall in Love' that features an Artificial Intelligence male main vocalist created by a start-up company AudAi. In December, Sae-byul joined her labelmates in a relay concert called 'Club ARC with Antenna' in a LG Arts Center Seoul and Antenna collaboration with the concept 'A Day in the Life of a Singer-Songwriter'.

On July 5, 2024, Sae-byul performed in 'Innovate Korea 2024' at KAIST with her song 'Fall in Love' featuring an AI created male vocalist. On October 30, Sae-byul was featured in the song '어쩌면 오래전부터'(Maybe a long time ago) by Captain Planet. From November 2 to 3, Sae-byul participated on Captain Planet's concert alongside Lee Seung-gi, Tim, Lee Seok-hoon, Davichi and Park Ji-yoon. From December 21 to 22, Sae-byul held her solo-concert 'Everblooming' at the National Science Museum in Gwacheon showcasing a multi-dimensional experience of music and art of light.

On September 30, 2025, Sae-byul released her EP "Still". The album is the second story to her previous EP "Everblooming", featuring an experiment combining human creativity and AI Technology.

== Discography ==
=== Studio albums ===
Title	Album details	Peak chart positions	Sales
Title	Album details	KOR	Sales
Morning Star (새벽별)	Released: March 29, 2010; Label: Antenna; Format: CD, digital download	10	—N/a
High Heel (하이힐)	Released: May 28, 2013; Label: Antenna; Format: CD, digital download	22	—N/a
Ballades Op.3	Released: October 31, 2019; Label: Antenna; Format: CD, digital download	76	—N/a

=== Extended plays ===
Title	Album details	Peak chart positions	Sales
Title	Album details	KOR	Sales
Diary	Released: November 13, 2008; Label: Antenna; Format: CD, digital download	—N/a	—N/a
Everblooming	Released: October 24, 2023; Label: Antenna; Format: digital download	—N/a	—N/a
Still	Released: September 30, 2025; Label: Antenna; Format: digital download	—N/a	—N/a

=== Singles ===
Title	Year	Peak chart positions	Sales	Album
Title	Year	KOR	Sales	Album
"Can You Hear Me?"	2008	—N/a	—N/a	Diary
"Forget-me-not" (물망초)	2010	—	—N/a	Morning Star
"If Love Lets Us Reunite" (사랑이 우릴 다시 만나게 한다면)	2013	—	KOR: 24,520	High Heel
"I Will Sing" (노래할게요) feat. Christian Kim	2013	98	KOR: 18,203	Non-album singles
"Sky High" with Like, Likes feat. Young K	2015	—	—N/a	Non-album singles
"Don't Let Me Go" (잊으라 하지마)	2019	—	—N/a	Ballades Op.3
"Concert in the Forest" (숩속음악휘)	2020	—	—	EBS Dingdongdang Kindergarten Forest Concert

== Broadcasting ==
- "아름다운 동요세상 (Beautiful World of Children's Songs)" on EBS FM radio (March 6, 2011 – February 28, 2012)
- MC of "문화콘서트 난장 (Culture concert, Nanjang)" on Gwangju MBC (2009)
- Nursery Rhymes Teacher for EBS's 'Ding Dong Daeng Kindergarten'
- MBC's 'Docuplex - Music Mentionary Mother'

=== Web shows ===
Year	Title	Network	Role	Notes	Ref.
2021	Clumsy Antenna	Kakao TV	Main Cast	with Artist from Antenna	

== See also ==
- Antenna Music
