= Dragon Pony =

South Korean boy band

- Dragon Pony in 2026: From left to right: Kwon Se-hyeok, Ahn Tae-gyu, Go Kang-hoon

Background information
- Origin: Seoul, South Korea
- Genres: Rock; pop rock; alternative rock
- Years active: 2024–present
- Label: Antenna
- Members: Ahn Tae-gyu; Kwon Se-hyuk; Ko Gang-hun
- Past members: Pyun Seung-hyun
- Website: https://antenna.co.kr/252

Dragon Pony (Korean: 드래곤포니) is a South Korean rock band formed by Antenna. The band consists originally of four members: Ahn Tae-gyu, Pyun Sung-hyun, Kwon Se-hyuk, and Ko Gang-hun. They debuted on September 26, 2024, with the extended play (EP) Pop Up. On August 25, 2026, Pyun Sung-hyun left the band and Antenna, making the remaining members continue as a trio.

== Name ==
Before debuting, the band had been “practice-performing” on clubs under the name ‘Seahamano’(새하마노). The band's name was eventually changed into ‘Dragon Pony’, taken from the members' Chinese Zodiac signs being born in the year of the dragon and the horse.

== History ==
=== 2024: Introduction and debut with Pop Up ===
Prior to their debut, the members auditioned separately and trained under Antenna. Gang-hun and Se-hyuk were first to join the company, training for four years. They were followed by Sung-hyuk who trained for three and a half years, and finally by Tae-gyu.

On March 19, Dragon Pony was officially introduced by music and entertainment agency Antenna as their first boy band to debut.

On April 4, Dragon Pony revealed through their official YouTube channel that they were required to complete two missions set by Antenna CEO Yoo Hee-yeol in order to debut. The first mission was to reach 20,000 followers on their official social media account (Instagram), while the second was to hold a solo concert attended by at least 500 audience members. On April 22, the group surpassed 20,000 followers, successfully completing the first mission.

On June 29, Dragon Pony held their solo concert for 500 audience members at Musinsa Garage in Mapo District, Seoul, thereby completing their debut mission. During this pre-debut period, the group remained active on their YouTube channel, documenting their debut journey and releasing live performance clips of self-composed songs such as “Morse Code,” “Traffic Jam,” “Waste,” “Ouroboros,” and “Pity Punk.” Even before their official debut, Dragon Pony performed at several live stages and festivals, including Mint Festa Vol. 73: Fascinating, 66th Live Club Day, and Road to BU-ROCK. During the same period, Dragon Pony participated in a commercial project titled Samsung Gift Funding Song alongside their labelmates and seniors Peppertones, Jung Jae-hyung, and Kwon Jin-ah. They also took part in Peppertones’ 20th-anniversary album, recording a remake version of the song “Deneb.”

On September 26, Dragon Pony officially debuted with their self-composed and produced EP Pop Up. Shortly after debut, the group was included in major music festival lineups such as 2024 Hyundai Card Da Vinci Motel, 2024 Busan International Rock Festival, and Grand Mint Festival 2024.

On October 10 to 12, Dragon Pony held a three-day consecutive busking called 'Dragon Pony Pop-up Busking' held at Sinchon Myungmul Quarter (Seoul), Yangyang Liberty (Gangwon-do) and Hyundai Uplex Sinchon (Seoul). On October 12, the group announced their first club tour, Dragon Pony POP-UP Club LIVE, consisting of performances in four clubs across Seoul, Busan, and Jeonju throughout November. On October 25, Dragon Pony appeared in their first post-debut pictorial and interview with fashion magazine Cosmopolitan. From October 30 to November 3, British heritage brand Fred Perry collaborated with Dragon Pony to open a brand community space titled Fred Perry Agit under the concept “Artist’s Hideout.” The collaboration featured a public exhibition space showcasing Dragon Pony’s props, personal items, and brand storytelling, along with the production of various original content.

On December 8, Dragon Pony performed at their first international festival, Big Mountain Music Festival, held in Nakhon Ratchasima, Thailand. They later performed at 2024 SOMEDAY CHRISTMAS in Yeosu on December 21, followed by a performance at Countdown Fantasy 2024–2025 at KINTEX Exhibition Center in Ilsan on December 30 to close the year.

=== 2025: Fan Club Introduction, EP - 'Not Out', First Domestic and International Concert, First OST and Award ===
On February 22, 2025, Dragon Pony performed for the first time, on one of Taiwan's largest festivals 'EMERGE FEST 2025'.

On March 13, Dragon Pony announced their official fan club name, 포용 (For Young)—a name combining “Po” from Pony and “Yong,” the Korean word for dragon. The name can also be read in English as “For Young,” symbolizing shared moments of youth between the band and their fans. On March 19, Dragon Pony released their second EP 'Not Out'. On March 24, Kodak Apparel announced a collaboration campaign with Dragon Pony and city pop musician Kim Hyun-chul called 'THE ICONIC MAILER'.

On May 3–4, Dragon Pony held their first solo concert since debut named, 'Dragon Pony 1st Concert 'Not Out' in Seoul'. On May 3, Dragon Pony participated in their first OST titled, 'You Pour Down On Me' (네가 쏟아진다) for the television series Crushology 101. On May 15, Dragon Pony was selected as Billboard’s Rookie of the Month. On May 23–24, Dragon Pony successfully held their first international solo concert in Taipei, Taiwan.

On June 6, Dragon Pony performed in Hong Kong for the first time at the 'theNextwave xx25 Beach Music Festival'. On June 22, Dragon Pony performed in Malaysia for the first time at the ' ASEAN - Korea Music Festival 2025 Round'.

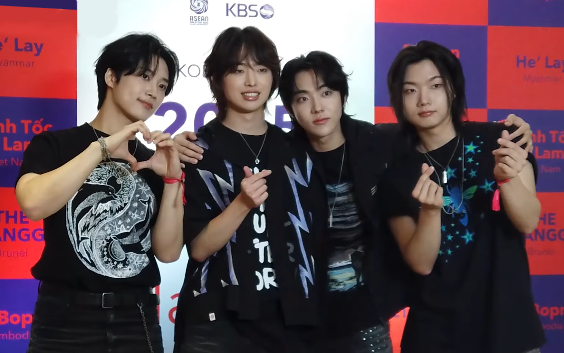
*From left to right: Pyun Seong-hyeon (Past Member), Kwon Se-hyeok, Ahn Tae-gyu, Go Kang-hoon at Round Festival 2025 Malaysia

On July 29, Dragon Pony released the digital single “지구소년 (Earth Boy),” also titled “Radio Silence” in English, which had been written during their trainee days.

On August 21, Dragon Pony won their first award at the '2025 K-WORLD DREAM AWARDS' receiving the 'Rookie Band Award'.

On September 20, Dragon Pony performed as of the lineup for the 2025 K-INDIE ON Rock Festival, organized by Koreanisches Kulturzentrum (Kultur Korea) and held at Säälchen Berlin, Germany—marking the group’s first performance in Europe.

On October 7–9, Dragon Pony attended the global music showcase series 'Korea Spotlight Showcase 2025' held in Tokyo and Osaka then followed by a showcase in Vietnam.

On November 22–23, Dragon Pony held a collaboration performance called 'Utopia Volume 2 'Dragon Pony X Kami wa Saikoro o Furanai' (Utopia) in Seoul.

In 2025, Dragon Pony also performed at various festivals namely: 'Inomas Music Series', 'The Glow 2025', 'Samcheok: A Visiting Popular Music Concert, Yonsei University’s 140th Anniversary Festival, Scent of Blue, '2025 Busan One Asia Festival', 'Beautiful Mint Life 2025', 'Seoul Park Music Festival', 'Live On BUSAN', 'SOUNDBERRY FESTA '25', '2025 Yeosu K-Mega Island Festival', '2025 Incheon Pentaport Rock Festival', '2025 Ulsan Summer Festival', '2025 SBS Gayo Daejeon', 'JUMF2025 (Jeongju Ultimate Music Festival)', '2025 Ulsan Summer Festival: Ulsan is Rock Too', '2025 Let's Rock Festival', 'MU:CON 2025', '2025 Donggu Dongrak Festival', '2025 Busan International Rock Festival', 'Grand Mint Festival 2025', and '2025 Someday Christmas in Busan'.

=== 2026: EP - 'RUN RUN RUN', Japan Debut with EP - 'Run to Run', departure of Bassist Pyun Sung-hyun and Single Album - 'Calling Back' ===
On January 16, 2026, Dragon Pony had a collaboration concert called youTopia vol.2 "Dragon Pony X KAMI WA SAIKORO WO FURANAI" held in Tokyo.

On March 10, Dragon Pony released their third EP 'RUN RUN RUN'. The EP is fully written, composed, arranged, and produced by the band.

On April 11, Dragon Pony participated in the '2026 MBN Sunset Marathon' at Seaside Park in Yeongjongdo, Incheon. On April 14 to 22, Dragon Pony operate a collaboration pop-up store with fashion brand AFTERMATH. On April 21, Dragon Pony's Vocalist An Tae Gyu sang the opening theme song for 'Pokémon: Rising Again' titled 'Orbit of Fragments'.

On May 1, Dragon Pony appeared on KBS 2TV's "The Seasons - Sung Si-kyung's Ear-Pleasing Boyfriend". On May 2 and 3, Dragon Pony held a solo concert called 'RUN RUN RUN in SEOUL' held in Gwangjin-gu, Seoul. This is followed by a solo concert in Taipei on May 23. On May 10, Dragon Pony was announced to be part of the 1st lineup for the 35th Seoul Music Awards. On May 14, Dragon Pony was featured in Marie Claire Korea's May issue.

On June 3, Dragon Pony pre-released 'Run to Win', the title track from their first Japanese EP, 'Run to Run'. On June, 6, Dragon Pony was included in the line-up for music festival 'Belleforet Week – My Volume 2026'. Dragon Pony made its Japanese debut on June 10 with release of the EP 'Run to Run' in partnership with Warner Music Japan. On June 13, the band performed in a collaborative concert with the band Touched titled, 'TOUCHED X DRAGON PONY: MINTPAPER 20th SPECIAL LIVE'. Dragon Pony held their first solo concerts after their Japanese debut at Tokyo on June 17 and Osaka on June 21. On June 20, Dragon Pony was given the Band Award at the 35th Seoul Music Awards.

On July 7, Dragon Pony announced that their member, Pyun Sung-hyun, will temporarily suspend his activities due to health reasons. The band will continue as a three-member group for the time being.

On August 16, Dragon Pony's vocalist An Tae-gyu participated in the OST for tVn drama 'Spooky in Love' (오싹한 연애) Part 8 titled 'Free Fall'. On August 17, Dragon Pony held a collaboration concert with ONEWE in Seoul Olympic Hall called 'live ICON 9 ONEWE X DRAGON PONY Mintpaper 20th Special Live'. On August 25, Antenna announced that Dragon Pony bassist, Pyun Sung-hyun, is leaving the band and the agency making the remaining members continue as a trio.

On October 4, Dragon Pony announced their year-end solo concert called '2026 Dragon Pony Concert Calling Back', to be held on December 5 and 6. On October 13, Dragon Pony announced the release of the single album, 'Calling Back", to be released on November 5.

On November 5, Dragon Pony made their first comeback as a trio with the single album 'Calling Back'. Dragon Pony also announced a solo concert to be held in Tokyo, Japan on January 10, 2027 titled, "2027 Dragon Pony Concert 'Calling back' in TOKYO".

On 2026, Dragon Pony also performed and were scheduled to be part of various festivals and events namely: 'Countdown Fantasy 2025-2026', 'EMERGE FEST 2026', 'THE GLOW 2026', '2026 MBN Sunset Festival', 'Incheon Pentaport Rock Festival 2026', 2026 Hongik University Seoul Campus Daedongje 'Hiesta:MEMENTO', 2026 Hanyang University 'Lachios:Chanran', Yonsei University 141st Anniversary Muak Daedongje <UNIT:Y>,'Beautiful Mint Life 2026', 'BELLEFORET WEEK:MY VOLUME', MINTPAPER 20th SPECIAL LIVE, '2026 Palette Festival', MINT FESTA Vol.84, '2026 Incheon Pentaport Rock Festival with KB Kookmin Card', '2026 Boryeong Mud Festival', '2026 CassCool Festival', '2026 Seocho Music & Art Festival', 'Sound Planet Festival 2026', '2026 Chung-ang University Community Festival RE:Play', '2026 Hyupsung University Auraji Festival: Untitled', 'The 4th Gwangsan Music ON Festival', '2026 Asia Top Artist Festival (hereinafter ATA Festival)', '2026 ESKARA:Waves of Green', '2026 Busan International Rock Festival', '2026 DEMICON: DEMISODA (Be) FRESH', '2026 Ansan Union Rock Festival', '2026 Kaohsiung Park Music Festival', 'October N Songjeong', 'Grand Mint Festival 2026', '2026 Jeju Festa', '2026 4th Ansan Union Festival', 'MAPO ON STAGE', '2026 Melon Music Awards" (MMA 2026) and 2026-2027 Countdown Fantasy.

== Members ==
- An Tae-gyu (안태규) – vocalist, rhythm guitar
- Kwon Se-hyuk (권세혁) – lead/rhythm guitar
- Ko Gang-hun (고강훈) – drummer

=== Past Member ===
- Pyun Sung-hyun (편성현) – bassist (2024-2026)

== Discography ==
=== Extended plays ===
List of extended plays, showing selected details, selected chart positions, and sales figures
Title	Details	Peak chart positions		Sales
Title	Details	KOR	JPN	Sales
Pop Up	Released: September 26, 2024; Label: Antenna; Formats: CD, digital download, streaming; Track listing: 1. "Pop Up"; 2. "Morse Code" (모스부호; 3. "Ouroboros" (꼬리를 먹는 뱀); 4. "Traffic Jam"; 5. "Pity Punk"	43	—	KOR: 5,143
Not Out	Released: March 19, 2025; Label: Antenna; Formats: CD, digital download, streaming; Track listing: 1. "Not Out"; 2. "Never"; 3. "Waste"; 4. "이타심 (To. Nosy Boy)"; 5. "On Air"	24	—	KOR: 15,111
Run Run Run	Released: March 10, 2026; Label: Antenna; Formats: CD, digital download, streaming; Track listing: 1. "Palm Lines" (손금); 2. "Oh Perfect!" (아 마음대로 다 된다!); 3. "Zombie"; 4. "Rehearsal" (리허설); 5. "Hidden" (숨긴 마음)	12	—	KOR: 16,083
Run to Run	1st Japanese EP; Released: June 10, 2026; Label: Antenna with Warner Music Japan; Formats: CD, digital download, streaming; Track listing: 1. "Run to Win"; 2. "Stand Together"; 3. "One Light, One Time"; 4. "Break the Chain"; 5. "Look Back"	—	49	JPN: 611

=== Single Albums ===
List of single albums, showing selected details, selected chart positions, and sales figures
Title	Details	Peak chart positions		Sales
Title	Details	KOR	JPN	Sales
Calling Back	Released: November 5, 2026; Label: Antenna; Formats: CD, digital download, streaming; Track listing: 1. Calling Back (Title Song); 2. Back When We Were Young	22	—	KOR: 15,579

=== Singles ===
List of singles, showing year released, selected chart positions, and name of the album
Title	Year	Peak chart positions	Album
Title	Year	KOR DL	Album
"Pop Up"	2024	—	Pop Up
"Not Out"	2025	171	Not Out
"지구소년"(Earth Boy) (English title: "Radio Silence")	2025	62	Non-album single
"Oh Perfect!" (아 마음대로 다 된다!)	2026	58	Run Run Run
"Palm Lines" (손금)	2026	76	Run Run Run
"Rehearsal" (리허설)	2026	79	Run Run Run
"Zombie"	2026	81	Run Run Run
"Hidden" (숨긴 마음)	2026	82	Run Run Run
"Calling Back"	2026	70	"Calling Back"
"Back When We Were Young"	2026	91	"Calling Back"

=== Soundtrack appearances ===
Title	Year	Peak chart positions	Album
Title	Year	KOR Circle	Album
"You Pour Down On Me" (네가 쏟아진다)	2025	—N/a	Crushology 101 OST

=== Other appearances ===
Title	Year	Album
"Deneb" (Remake song of the band Peppertones)	2024	Twenty Plenty
"Samsung Gift Funding Song" (with Peppertones, Jung Jae-hyung and Kwon Jin-ah)	2024	Non-album single
"So Nice (GMF2025 ver.)" (Grand Mint Festival theme song 2025 version)	2025	Non-album single

== Awards and nominations ==
Year	Award	Category	Nominee	Result	Ref.
2025	2025 K-World Dream Awards	Rookie Band Award	Dragon Pony	Won	
2026	35th Seoul Music Awards	Band Award	Dragon Pony	Won	
