= Da Capo (Toy album) =

Studio album by Toy
- Released: November 18, 2014
- Recorded: 2014
- Genre: K-pop, ballad
- Length: 56:18
- Language: Korean
- Label: Antenna Music, CJ E&M Music
- Producer: Yoo Hee-yeol, Shin Jae-pyung

Toy chronology
Thank You (2007)	Da Capo (2014)

Singles from Da Capo
- 1. "Three of Us (세 사람)" Released: November 18, 2014; 2. "Reset" Released: December 7, 2014

Da Capo (Italian music term meaning "from the beginning") is the seventh studio album by South Korean one-man project band Toy. It was released on November 18, 2014, by Antenna Music and distributed by CJ E&M Music.

The album drew attention as various musicians collaborated with the band for the album as featured artists; Sung Si-kyung, Kim Dong-ryool, Lee Juck, Sunwoo Jung-ah, Dynamic Duo, Crush, Beenzino, Zion.T, Kwon Jin-ah, Lee Soo-hyun of Akdong Musician, and Lim Kim of Togeworl.

Da Capo has spawned two singles, the number-one hit "Three of Us" and the top 20 song "Reset". The album, co-produced by Yoo Hee-yeol (the band's sole member) and Shin Jae-pyung (of electronic duo Peppertones), is Toy's first full-length release after a seven-year hiatus since Thank You (2007).

== Singles ==
=== "Three of Us" ===
"Three of Us" (Korean: 세 사람; RR: Se Saram), the album's lead single, is a 10-year sequel to "Good Person" (Korean: 좋은 사람; RR: Joeun Saram), which was served as the lead track for the group's fifth studio album Fermata (2001). Performed by Sung Si-kyung, this song follows the pitiful emotions of a man who has to watch the happiness of his two friends before their wedding, never expressing his love.

It was announced that actor Yoo Yeon-seok and former Miss Korea Kim Yu-mi starred in the song's music video.

== Track listing ==
CD/Digital download
No.	Title	Lyrics	Music	Length
1.	"No One Knows (Instrumental)" (아무도 모른다; Amudo Moreunda)		Yoo Hee-yeol	2:33
2.	"Reset" (with Lee Juck)	Yoo Hee-yeol	Yoo Hee-yeol	5:07
3.	"Goodbye Sun, Goodbye Moon" (with Lee Soo-hyun of Akdong Musician)	Lee Kyu-ho, Yoo Hee-yeol	Yoo Hee-yeol	4:48
4.	"Three of Us" (세 사람; Se Saram, with Sung Si-kyung)	Yoo Hee-yeol	Yoo Hee-yeol	4:45
5.	"Stay at Our Sea" (너의 바다에 머무네; Neoui Bada-e Meomune, with Kim Dong-ryool)	Yoo Hee-yeol, Lee Kyu-ho	Yoo Hee-yeol	5:16
6.	"U & I" (with Crush and Beenzino)	Yoo Hee-yeol, Beenzino, Crush	Yoo Hee-yeol	4:27
7.	"Life Is Beautiful" (인생은 아름다워; Insaeng-eun Areumdawo, with Dynamic Duo, Zion.T, and Crush)	Dynamic Duo, Kim Eana, Yoo Hee-yeol	Yoo Hee-yeol	4:22
8.	"Piano (Instrumental)" (피아노)		Yoo Hee-yeol	2:10
9.	"Pianissimo" (피아니시모; Pianisimo, with Lim Kim of Togeworl)	Yoo Hee-yeol	Yoo Hee-yeol	4:20
10.	"She Said" (그녀가 말했다; Geunyeoga Malhaetda, with Kwon Jin-ah)	Yoo Hee-yeol, Lee Kyu-ho	Yoo Hee-yeol	4:27
11.	"Always Being Strangers" (언제나 타인; Eonjena Tain, with Sunwoo Jung-ah)	Yoo Hee-yeol, Sunwoo Jung-ah	Yoo Hee-yeol	4:40
12.	"The Story of Us" (우리; Uri, performed by Yoo Hee-yeol)	Yoo Hee-yeol	Yoo Hee-yeol	5:20
13.	"The Night with No One" (취한 밤; Chwihan Bam, performed by Yoo Hee-yeol)	Yoo Hee-yeol	Yoo Hee-yeol	4:03
Total length:				56:18

Notes

- The title of track 4 literally means "Three People".
- The title of track 5 literally means "I Stay at Your Sea".
- The title of track 12 literally means "Us".
- The title of track 13 literally means "A Drunken Night".

== Chart performance ==
=== Album charts ===
Chart (2014)	Peak position	Sales
South Korean Gaon Weekly Albums Chart	2	KOR: 42,934+
South Korean Gaon Monthly Albums Chart	3	KOR: 42,934+
South Korean Gaon Year-End Albums Chart	46	KOR: 42,934+
US Billboard World Albums Chart	4	KOR: 42,934+

=== Single charts ===
Three of Us

Chart (2014)	Peak position	Sales
South Korean Gaon Weekly Singles Chart	1	KOR: 1,031,872+ (digital downloads only)
South Korean Gaon Monthly Singles Chart	6	KOR: 1,031,872+ (digital downloads only)
South Korean Gaon Year-End Singles Chart	64	KOR: 1,031,872+ (digital downloads only)

Reset

Chart (2014)	Peak position	Sales
South Korean Gaon Weekly Singles Chart	11	KOR: 231,484+ (digital downloads only)
South Korean Gaon Monthly Singles Chart	44	KOR: 231,484+ (digital downloads only)
South Korean Gaon Year-End Singles Chart	—	KOR: 231,484+ (digital downloads only)

=== Other charted songs ===
Title	Peak chart position	Sales
Title	KOR Gaon	Sales
"U & I"	3	KOR: 517,099+ (digital downloads only)
"Life Is Beautiful"	6	KOR: 283,584+ (digital downloads only)
"Stay at Our Sea"	8	KOR: 226,325+ (digital downloads only)
"Goodbye Sun, Goodbye Moon"	9	KOR: 265,786+ (digital downloads only)
"She Said"	10	KOR: 291,758+ (digital downloads only)
"Pianissimo"	16	KOR: 168,688+ (digital downloads only)
"The Story of Us"	20	KOR: 126,049+ (digital downloads only)
"The Night with No One"	22	KOR: 123,000+ (digital downloads only)
"Always Being Strangers"	24	KOR: 119,990+ (digital downloads only)
"No One Knows (Instrumental)"	30	KOR: 85,158+ (digital downloads only)
"Piano (Instrumental)"	32	KOR: 84,723+ (digital downloads only)

== Awards and nominations ==
=== Annual music awards ===
Year	Award	Category	Recipient	Result
2015	24th Seoul Music Awards	Bonsang (Main Prize)	Toy	Nominated
2015	24th Seoul Music Awards	High1/Mobile Popularity Award	Toy	Nominated
2015	24th Seoul Music Awards	Hallyu Special Award	Toy	Nominated

=== Music program awards ===
Song	Program	Date
"Three of Us"	Music Bank (KBS)	November 28, 2014
"Three of Us"	Show! Music Core (MBC)	November 29, 2014

== Release history ==
Region	Date	Format	Label
South Korea	November 18, 2014	CD, digital download	Antenna Music, CJ E&M Music
Worldwide	November 18, 2014	Digital download	Antenna Music, CJ E&M Music
