= Kwon Jin-ah =

South Korean singer-songwriter (born 1997)

Kwon Jin-ah 권진아
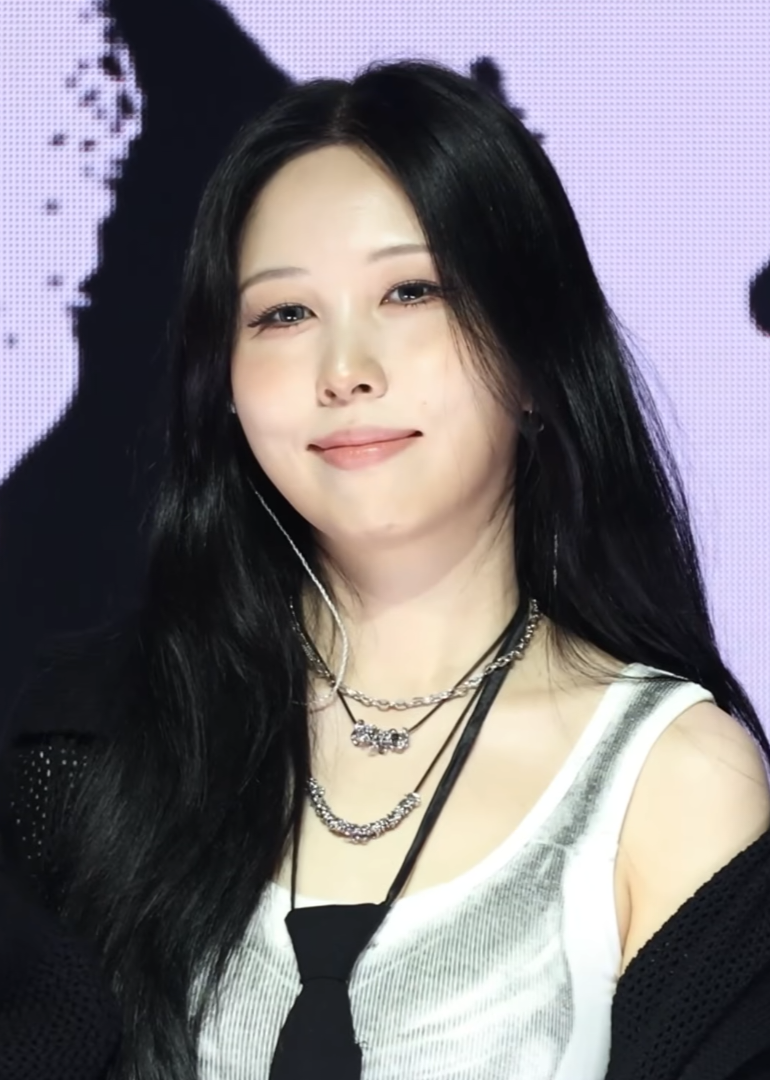
- Kwon in July 2026

Background information
- Born: July 18, 1997 (age 28)
- Origin: Busan, South Korea
- Genres: R&B; pop; rock
- Occupations: Singer; songwriter
- Instruments: Vocals; guitar; piano
- Years active: 2013–present
- Labels: Antenna Music (2014–2024); Another Label (2025–present)
- Website: kwonjinah.bstage.in

Kwon Jin-ah (Korean: 권진아; born July 18, 1997) is a South Korean singer-songwriter and guitarist. She began her music career after winning third place on SBS' K-pop Star 3 in 2014 and subsequently signing to Antenna Music. She debuted in 2016, with the studio album One Strange Night.

== Career ==
=== 2013–2015: K-pop Star 3 and pre-debut activities ===
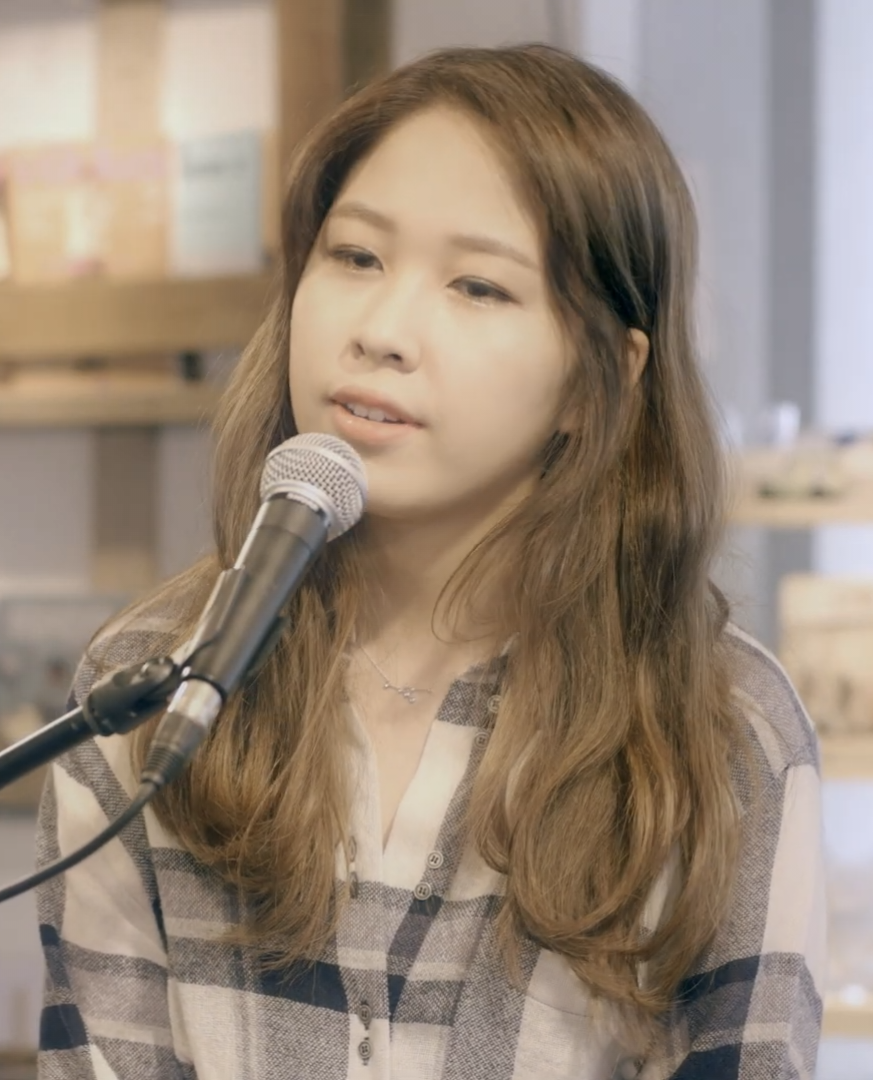
Kwon performing in 2015

In 2013, Kwon became a contestant on K-pop Star 3 and placed third in the competition. On May 13, 2014, it was announced that she had signed an exclusive contract with Antenna Music. On June 19, she released her first OST, "I Only See You", for the SBS drama You're All Surrounded. Later that year, she featured on the song "She Said" from Yoo Hee-yeol's Da Capo album. In 2015, she and RM from BTS featured in the song "U" on Primary's album, 2.

=== 2016–present: Debut ===
In July 2015, Antenna Music announced that Kwon's debut album was nearing completion, with an expected release date in September 2015. It was pushed back, however, due to her experiencing an emotional slump at the time.

On July 18, 2016, she released the duet single "For Now" with fellow Antenna signee and K-pop Star 3 finalist Sam Kim. The pair promoted as a duo, opening for Charlie Puth's concert in Seoul the following month and performing together at the Asia Song Festival in October.

On 19 September 2016, Kwon made her solo debut with the full-length studio album One Strange Night. It featured songwriting and production contributions from You Hee-yeol, Sunwoojunga, Cha Cha Malone, Ra.D, D.ear and Yun Seok-cheol. Kwon wrote lyrics and music for three songs on the album: "Zig Zag", "Smack" and "20"; with "Zig Zag" being completely self-produced and recorded in her bedroom at home. The album's lead single, "The End", debuted at 17 on the Gaon Digital Chart and charted within the top 100 for more than four months.

On March 24, 2022, Antenna released a video introducing Kwon's new single "Pink!" via SNS on the 24th, and announced their comeback on March 31, 2022.

In May 2022, tickets for Kwon's solo concert "The Dreamer" were sold out, which was held from June 3 to 5, 2022.

In October 2022, Kwon released her new digital single "Stupid Love", released on October 13.

In February 2023, the agency announced that Kwon will make a comeback with EP "The Flag" which is scheduled to be released on March 2, and will also hold solo concerts on April 1 and 2. In July 29–30, Kwon held her first fan concert since her debut called "Love Me" in which she performed covers and several of her songs including unreleased and to be released songs. In August 10, Kwon released her self-composed single "Love Me Love Me" which is intended to be a bright and refreshing song. In September 15, Antenna announced Kwon's official fun club "JinahON" recruitment followed by a pop up store to commemorate the release of her single and founding of her fan club. In September 22, Kwon appeared in Tiny Desk Korea. In October 21, Antenna announced Kwon's first solo international concert in Taipei, Taiwan to be held on 26 November. In November 1, Hyundai Korea released a song called "Wish" featuring Kwon Jinah, Kyuhyun, and Sam Kim.

On January 9, 2024, Kwon won the female vocal category at the 2024 Korea First Brand Awards. In March 4, Kwon started taking pre-orders for the limited edition LP of her EP Our Way. In March 15–17, Kwon held her largest solo concert called "Floriography" at SK Olympic Handball Stadium. In May 26, Kwon appeared in a program called Song Stealer, where it features musicians reinterpreting other contestant's songs. Kwon also joined her fellow agency artists for an Antenna and Samsung Collaboration of a Gift Funding Song. In June 17, Kwon is one of the featured artists for Antenna and Jeju Air collaboration. In September 5, Antenna announced Kwon's departure from the agency after 10 years. On December 13–15, Kwon held her first year-end and sold-out concert called "This Winter".

On February 14, 2025, Kwon signs and established a one-person agency called "Another Label". On April 25, 2025, Kwon released her third full-length album in six years called The Dreamest with 10 tracks.

== Discography ==
=== Studio albums ===
Title	Album details	Peak chart positions	Sales (Phys.)
Title	Album details	KOR	Sales (Phys.)
One Strange Night (웃긴 밤)	Released: September 19, 2016; Label: Antenna Music; Formats: CD, digital download; Track listing: 1. "Zigzag" (지그재그); 2. "The End" (끝); 3. "Smack" (쪽쪽); 4. "Yah!" (야) (ft. Babylon); 5. "You Know..." (다 알면서...) (feat. Jay Park); 6. "Wanna Be Her" (그녀가 되길); 7. "20" (스물)	10	KOR: 1,600
Shape of Me (나의 모양)	Released: September 19, 2019; Label: Antenna Music; Formats: CD, digital download; Track listing: 1. "I Got Lucky" (운이 좋았지); 2. "6:35 PM" (시계 바늘); 3. "Late Farewell" (늦은 배웅); 4. "The Night" (그날 밤); 5. "Just Wanna Love You" (그냥 사랑할래); 6. "Melody" (멜로디); 7. "Hide and Seek" (숨바꼭질); 8. "Tell Me About Your Day" (오늘 뭐 했는지 말해봐); 9. "Meet Me in Dreams" (꿈에서 만나); 10. "Shape of Me" (나의 모양)	57	—N/a
The Dreamest (더 드리미스트)	Released: April 25, 2025; Label: Another; Formats: CD, digital download; Track listing: 1. "Turning Page" (새 발자국); 2. "Reunion" (재회); 3. "Let Me Go" (놓아줘); 4. "Don't Go Today" (오늘은 가지마); 5. "stillmissu" (스틸 미스 유); 6. "Naughty Train" (노티 트레인); 7. "Wonderland" (원더랜드); 8. "Love & Hate" (러브 앤 헤이트); 9. "Adult Child" (어른이 된 아이); 10. "To Meet You" (널 만나려고)	44	KOR: 1,377

=== Extended plays ===
Title	EP details	Peak chart positions	Sales (Phys.)
Title	EP details	KOR	Sales (Phys.)
The Way For Us (우리의 방식)	Released: February 18, 2021; Label: Antenna; Formats: CD, digital download; Track listing: 1. "The Way For Us" (우리의 방식); 2. "Good Bye" (잘 가); 3. "Flower Heart" (꽃말); 4. "You Already Have"; 5. "Pretend To Be" (어른처럼) (with George); 6. "The Dreamer" (여행가)	40	KOR: 4,455
The Flag	Released: March 2, 2023; Label: Antenna; Formats: CD, digital download; Track listing: 1. "Nighttide" (밤); 2. "Raise Up the Flag"; 3. "These Days" (이런 식); 4. "As I Dream" (꿈꾸는 대로); 5. "Butterfly"	65	KOR: 2,192

=== Singles ===
Title	Year	Peak chart positions	Sales (DL)	Album
Title	Year	KOR	Sales (DL)	Album
As lead artist
"The End" (끝)	2016	17	KOR: 506,059	One Strange Night
"Fly Away"	2017	33	KOR: 108,199	Non-album singles
"This Winter" (이번 겨울)	2018	69	—N/a	Non-album singles
"Tell Me About Your Day" (오늘 뭐 했는지 말해봐)	2019	87	—N/a	Shape of Me
"I Got Lucky" (운이 좋았지)	2019	—	—N/a	Shape of Me
"6:35 PM" (시계 바늘)	2019	87	—N/a	Shape of Me
"Something's Wrong" (뭔가 잘못됐어)	2020	109	—N/a	Non-album single
"Good Bye" (잘 가)	2021	110	—N/a	The Way for Us
"I"	2021	—	—N/a	Ad campaign singles
"Walk Home with Me" (Acoustic Ver.)	2021	—	—N/a	Ad campaign singles
"Pink!"	2022	—	—N/a	Non-album singles
"Stupid Love" (진심이었던 사람만 바보가 돼)	2022	81	—N/a	Non-album singles
"Pretend to Be (Sleep Mix)" (어른처럼 (Sleep Mix))	2022	—	—N/a	Non-album singles
"Raise Up the Flag"	2023	—	—N/a	The Flag
"Love Me Love Me"	2023	—	—N/a	Non-album singles
"Excuse" (핑계)	2025	127	—N/a	Non-album singles
"Last Love" (끝사랑)	2025	156	—N/a	Non-album singles
Collaborations
"Duet" (with E Z Hyoung)	2015	—	—N/a	Non-album singles
"For Now" (여기까지) (with Sam Kim)	2016	17	KOR: 141,804	Non-album singles
"Should We Start?" (우리 시작해도 괜찮을까요) (with Jung Joon-Il)	2019	61	—N/a	Fever Music 2019
"Everything Is OK (with Antenna Version)" (with Antenna artists (Note: Lucid Fall, Chai, Lee Jin-ah, Jung Seung-hwan, Jung Jae-hyung, Sam Kim, Park Sae-byul, Peppertones, Yun Seok-cheol, Toy))	2020	—	—N/a	Non-album singles
"Our Christmas Wish for You" (겨울의 우리들) (with Antenna artists (Note: Toy, Jung Seung-hwan, Sam Kim, Jung Jae-hyung, Lucid Fall, Peppertones, Park Sae-byul, Lee Jin-ah, Yun Seok-cheol, Jukjae, Chai, Seo Dong-hwan))	2020	107	—N/a	Non-album singles
"For You, My Sunshine" (빛나는 당신을 위해) (with Jukjae)	2021	123	—N/a	Ad campaign single
"I Feel Like" (마음이 그래) (with Gaeko)	2021	40	—N/a	Non-album singles
"Knock" (with Park Moon-chi)	2021	156	—N/a	Non-album singles
"End of Night" (밤의 한계) (with Ecobridge)	2022	—	—N/a	Non-album singles
"Happy Hour" (with J.Y. Park)	2025	—	—N/a	Non-album singles
As featured artist
"Don't Forget" (잊지 말기로 해) (Sung Si-kyung feat. Kwon Jin-ah)	2014	1	KOR: 586,405	Winter Wonderland
"I'm Still" (그 땔 살아) (Eden feat. Kwon Jin-ah)	2017	—	—N/a	Urban Hymns
"Say You'll Be Mine" (Mamas Gun feat. Kwon Jin-ah)	2019	—	—N/a	We Are Mamas Gun
"Teddy Bear" (Davii feat. Kwon Jin-ah)	2020	—	—N/a	Non-album single
Charted soundtrack appearances
"Lonely Night"	2020	45	—N/a	Hospital Playlist Season 1 OST
"What I Want" (문턱)	2021	126	—N/a	Odd Girl Out webtoon OST
"—" denotes releases that did not chart or were not released in that region.

=== Other charted songs ===
Title	Year	Peak chart positions		Sales (DL)	Album
Title	Year	KOR Gaon	KOR Hot 100 (Note: The K-pop Hot 100 was discontinued on July 16, 2014. The chart was later re-established following the term date of May 29 – June 4, 2017.)	Sales (DL)	Album
As lead artist
"See Through" (씨스루)	2014	10	10	KOR: 353,993	K-pop Star Season 3 Top 10 Part 1
"24 Hours"	2014	21	48	KOR: 81,614	K-pop Star Season 3 Top 8
"Fields of Gold"	2014	60	72	KOR: 23,710	K-pop Star Season 3 Top 6
"Even After Ten Years" (십년이 지나도)	2014	23	36	KOR: 54,876	K-pop Star Season 3 Top 4
"Love"	2014	43	72	KOR: 77,105	K-pop Star Season 3 Top 3
"You Know..." (다 알면서...) (feat. Jay Park)	2016	89	—N/a	KOR: 25,936	One Strange Night
As featured artist
"She Said" (그녀가 말했다) (Toy feat. Kwon Jin-ah)	2014	10	—N/a	KOR: 291,758	Da Capo
"U" (Primary feat. Kwon Jin-ah, Rap Monster)	2015	22	—N/a	KOR: 143,705	2

=== Soundtrack appearances ===
Title	Year	Album
"I Only See You" (그대만 보여요)	2014	You're All Surrounded OST Part 4
"With You" (연애 좀 할까)	2016	Don't Dare to Dream OST Part 11
"I Do (Main Song)" with Sam Kim	2017	The Lovebirds: Year 1 X Antenna
"Everyday (Happy Ver.)" with Sam Kim	2017	The Lovebirds: Year 1 X Antenna
"Behind the Page" (이별 뒷면)	2017	Flower Ever After OST Part 2
"Consolation" (위로)	2019	Be Melodramatic OST Part 1
"Lonely Night"	2020	Hospital Playlist OST Part 1
"Like a Star" (별처럼)	2020	Oh My Baby OST Part 4
"Light and Darkness" (평행선)	2020	TalesRunner OST Part 2
"What I Want" (문턱)	2021	Odd Girl Out webtoon OST
"Run to You"	2021	The Great Shaman Ga Doo-shim OST
"When You Believe" (사랑이 올 거야)	2022	Nine of Us webtoon OST
"Such a Beautiful Thing" (참 아름다운 일)	2022	Cheer Up OST Part 7
"Astelle"	2023	MapleStory M OST
"You"	2023	Agency OST Part 4
"You Are Different"	2023	A Secret I Want to Tell OST
"Dalangbi"(濛雨)	2024	Sejak, The Enchanted OST
'How You Feelin"	2025	'My Perfect Secretary' OST Part 2

=== Broadcast singles ===
Title	Year	Album
"I Don't Stop" (난 멈추지 않는다) with Sam Kim	2016	Two Yoo Project Sugar Man Part 35
"At This Time" (이맘 때면) with Chancellor	2016	Sing for You – The Second Christmas
"Y" with Big Naughty	2020	Two You Project Sugar Man 3 Episode 6
"Couple" (연인)	2020	You Hee-yul's Sketchbook: 27th Voice
"Lonely Night" with 10cm	2021	Begin Again Open Mic Episode 9
"Stalker" with 10cm	2021	Begin Again Open Mic Episode 9

=== Other appearances ===
Title	Year	Album
"Your Song" (연애 좀 할까) Sam Kim with Lee Jin-ah, Jung Seung-hwan and Kwon Jin-ah	2016	I Am Sam
"We Are" (우리 시작) Lee Jin-ah with Sam Kim, Kwon Jin-ah, Jung Seung-hwan, Chai	2018	Jinah Restaurant Full Course
"Change" (변한 걸까) Kwon Soon-il with Kwon Jin-ah	2019	With
"Goodnight" Dvwn feat. Kwon Jin-ah	2021	It's Not Your Fault
"Rope" (줄) Be'O feat. Kwon Jin-ah	2022	Five Senses
"Wish" with Kyuhun and Sam Kim	2023	Hyundai Motors, 2024 New Year's Countdown

== Filmography ==
=== TV series ===
Year	Title	Notes
2013–2014	K-pop Star 3	Contestant
2019, 2021	King of Mask Singer	Contestant (ep. 191–193, 297–298)
2022	Hangout with Yoo	Regular cast (as member of WSG Wannabe)
2024	Song Stealer	Contestant

=== Web shows ===
Year	Title	Notes	Ref.
2021	Clumsy Antenna	Series regular (with Antenna artists)	

== Awards and nominations ==
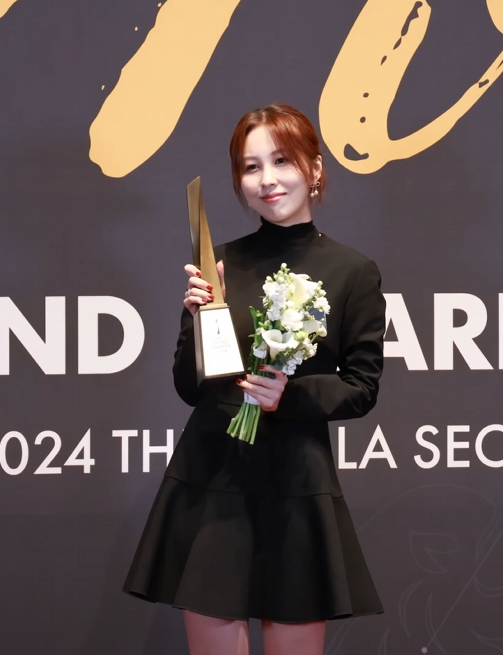
Kwon at the Korea First Brand Awards in 2024

Year	Award	Category	Nominee	Result	Ref.
2016	Golden Disc Awards	Best New Artist	Kwon Jin-ah	Nominated	
2016	Melon Music Awards	Best Rookie	Kwon Jin-ah	Nominated	
2021	Mnet Asian Music Awards	Best Collaboration	"I Feel Like" (with Gaeko)	Nominated	
2024	Korea First Brand Awards	Female Vocal	Kwon Jin-ah	Won	
