= Lee Jin-ah =

South Korean musician (born 1991)

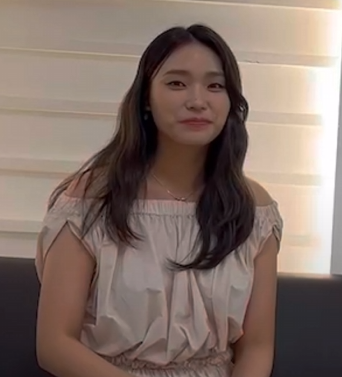
- Lee in 2022
- Born: March 16, 1991 (age 35); Gwangju, South Korea
- Occupations: Musician; singer-songwriter; film music director
- Years active: 2013–present
- Spouse: Shin Sung-jin (m. 2019)
- Children: 1
- Musical career
- Genres: Jazz; pop
- Instruments: Vocals; piano; keyboards
- Label: Antenna
- Website: antenna.co.kr/LeeJinAh

Korean name
- Hangul: 이진아
- Hanja: 李珍雅
- RR: I Jina
- MR: I China

Lee Jin-ah (Korean: 이진아; born March 16, 1991) is a South Korean singer-songwriter and jazz pianist. After finishing in third place on SBS's K-pop Star 4, she signed with Antenna in 2015. Her distinctive musical style combines jazz with pop and R&B, often featuring whimsical lyrics.

== Biography ==
=== Early career ===
Lee Jin-ah majored in applied music at Seoul Institute of the Arts.

In 2011, she took part in the CCM singer audition program Gospel Star C Season 1 as part of a group called Snowdrop, who placed within the final top 10.

On March 5, 2012, she was selected as the winner of the 9th Tune Up, a competition and musician support program run by the CJ Cultural Foundation.

Lee debuted in 2013 with her first album, Invisible. The album was produced by Kim Soo-jin, a music director who had previously produced OSTs for dramas including Behind The White Tower, Sign, and Queen Seondeok. Lee Han-jin, a professor of applied music at Seoul Institute of the Arts participated in this album as a jazz trombone performer. This album was considered too intense to be a debut of a new musician.

She was a member of the "JinA Band". The other members of "JinA Band" were Park Hyun (contrabass) and Cho Sun-kyun (drums) before and after K-pop Star 4.

=== 2014–2016: K-pop Star 4 and signing with Antenna Music ===
In 2014, she participated as a contestant in K-pop Star 4, a reality television audition program on SBS. She performed seven self-written songs, which is rare in audition programs, drawing rave reviews from the judges with her performances. JYP Entertainment CEO Park Jin-young, one of the three judges, became especially impressed, saying he "might as well quit the music industry now." Antenna Entertainment CEO You Hee-yeol drew attention by saying, "I think I saw here the reality of a female musician who I had dreamed of not being able to conclude or define." Lee and her songs became very popular through this program.

On April 5, 2015, she won 3rd place in said competition. On April 20, it was announced that she had signed with Antenna Music alongside Jung Seung-hwan who was her co-contestant and runner-up for K-pop Star 4.

On June 10, 2016, Lee Jin-ah made a label debut with the single "I'm Full" which is the first part of her trilogy release. She also was involved in the agency concert called "Hello Antenna:The Label Concert" held from September 23–25.

=== 2017–2018: Random and Jinah Restaurant Full Course ===
In March, 2017, Lee Jin-ah was part of a concert by "Antenna Angels" (Antenna Music's junior artists) called "We, Begin". On July 20, 2017, her first EP Random was released. This served as the second part of her trilogy release. She produced all songs in it at the recommendation of her agency CEO You Hee-yeol. You Hee-yeol said to her not to pay much attention to the album's success, praising her as "a musician who shows her true value at a concert hall."

Random was described by Jung Yeon-kyung at the music publication IZM as "a mixture of Girls' Generation, Jamie Cullum, Okdal, and Disney animated musicals". In particular, the song "Stairs" was noticed by critics for its novel fusion of pop and jazz. On the title track "Random", the lyrics describe an experience in which she discovered an unexpected joy while listening to music in random play. She said this song contains the meaning of discarding prejudice in music and other things. The EP was later nominated for Best Pop Album at the 2018 Korean Music Awards.

In 2017 Park Jong-woo (bass) joined the "Lee Jin-ah trio". Another member of the "Lee Jin-ah Trio" is Seo Ju-young (drums). Both Lee Jin-ah and Seo Ju-young entered Seoul Institute of the Arts in the same year. Park Jong-woo was a year senior. Park and Seo have sometimes participated in composing and arranging her songs.

Lee Jin-ah was also part of Antenna's label concert later that year called "With, Antenna" that toured throughout 5 cities in South Korea and U.S.

On June 26, 2018, she released her 2nd full album Jinah Restaurant Full Course which is the final part of her trilogy release.

=== 2020–present: Candy Pianist and Hearts of the City ===
In 2020, her second EP, Candy Pianist was released. By participating in writing and composing all the songs in this EP, Lee once again proved her ability as a singer-songwriter. The theme of it is "Awakening", which is clearly shown in the title song "Dreamy Alarm", "Awake (Feat. Sam Kim)", and other tracks. This EP contains Lee's desire to give strength and motivate those who listen to her music as a candy pianist.

In 2021, she made her debut as a film music director with Children Are Happy OST.

On September 13, 2023, Lee Jin-ah released her 3rd full length album after 5 years called Hearts of the City. This album is filled with 12 songs presenting a new musical world built from various emotions observed in a familiar but scary world called "city" while also warmly touching the inner hearts of those who live in one. It has two title tracks, namely "Mystery Village" depicting the city as mysterious place, and "My Whole New World" giving encouragement to build our own enjoyable city. This album also features various artists such as Stella Jang, Sarah Kang, cellist Hong Jin-ho, Lee Hyo-ri, Lee Sangsoon, and producers Park Moon-chi and Simon Petrén.

== Personal life ==
Lee married pianist Shin Sung-jin in March 2019. They met as music students at Seoul Institute of the Arts. Shin has steadily participated in her songs by playing musical instruments, rhythm programming, and string arrangements. On January 7, 2025, Lee announced her pregnancy. Lee announced the birth of her first child on July 7, 2025.

== Discography ==
=== Studio albums ===
Title	Album details	Peak chart positions	Sales
Title	Album details	KOR	Sales
Unvisible (보이지 않는 것)	Released: October 10, 2013; Label: Chili Music Korea; Formats: CD, digital download; Track listing: 1. Unvisible (보이지 않는 것); 2. A Letter (편지); 3. I Love You Song (사랑해 쏭); 4. Time Slow Down (시간아 천천히); 5. After Years; 6. Believe (믿어요) (feat. Lee Han-jin); 7. Coloring Book (색칠놀이); 8. Single Flower of Star (별 한송이); 9. Ordinary Days (feat. Lee Gyeong-rok); 10. Farewell Diamond (이별보석)	13	KOR: 1,550
Jinah Restaurant Full Course (진아식당 Full Course)	Released: June 26, 2018; Label: Antenna; Formats: CD, digital download; Track listing: 1. Run (with Gray); 2. What is Love? (편하다는 건 뭘까); 3. Yum Yum Yum (냠냠냠) (Rebooted Ver. with TAK); 4. Like & Love; 5. Stairs (계단); 6. Random; 7. Nothing Special (별것도 아닌 일); 8. Everyday; 9. What Should I Do (어디서부터); 10. Bye Bye Bye (밤, 바다, 여행); 11. Find the Day (오늘을 찾아요); 12. We Are (우리 시작) (with Sam Kim, Kwon Jin-ah, Jung Seung-hwan, Chai)	40	—N/a
Hearts of the City (도시의 속마음)	Released: September 13, 2023; Label: Antenna; Formats: CD, digital download; Track listing: 1. My Whole New World; 2. Mystery Village (with producer Simon Petrén); 3. End of the Journey (여행의 끝에서) (with Stella Jang); 4. Skyline (도시의 건물); 5. True Friends ((진정한 친구); 6. City Lights (with Sarah Kang); 7. Dreams of Sadness (잠결의 슬픔) (feat. Hong Jin-ho); 8. Midnight Delivery; 9. Accepting; 10. When You Come Home (너가 집에 오면 난); 11. Sing! (Prod. Park Moon-chi); 12. Words(말) (with Lee Hyo-ri and Lee Sang-soon)	—	—N/a
"—" denotes releases that did not chart or were not released in that region.

=== Extended plays ===
Title	Album details	Peak chart positions	Sales
Title	Album details	KOR	Sales
Random	Released: July 20, 2017; Label: Antenna; Formats: CD, digital download; Track listing: 1. Stairs (계단); 2. Random; 3. Nothing Special (별것도 아닌 일); 4. Everyday; 5. What Should I Do (어디서부터); 6. Bye Bye Bye (밤, 바다, 여행); 7. Find the Day (오늘을 찾아요)	35	KOR: 999
Candy Pianist (캔디 피아니스트)	Released: September 29, 2020; Label: Antenna; Formats: CD, digital download; Track listing: 1. Candy Pianist (캔디 피아니스트); 2. The Wall Blocks Me (나를 막는 벽); 3. Dreamy Alarm (꿈같은 알람); 4. Noisily Anywhere (여기저기 시끄럽게) (feat. Toy); 5. Dust (먼지); 6. Awake (feat. Sam Kim)	28	—N/a

=== Singles ===
Title	Year	Peak chart positions	Sales	Album
Title	Year	KOR	Sales	Album
"Coloring Book" (색칠놀이)	2013	—	—N/a	Unvisible
"Life is Ninano" (사는게 니나노)	2015	—	—N/a	Ad campaign singles
"Road to the Airport" (공항 가는 길) with J.Y. Park	2015	45	KOR: 57,544	Ad campaign singles
"I'm Full" (배불러)	2016	—	—N/a	Appetizer single album
"Starry Night" (밤과 별의 노래) with Onew	2016	47	KOR: 68,668	SM Station Season 1
"Random"	2017	—	—N/a	Random
"Run" with Gray	2018	—	—N/a	Jinah Restaurant Full Course
"I-Nuri Song" (아이누리 Song)	2019	—	—N/a	Ad campaign singles
"Warm Heart" (따뜻한 힘)	2019	—	—N/a	Ad campaign singles
"Everything Is OK (With Antenna Ver.)" with Antenna artists	2020	—	—N/a	Non-album singles
"Dangerous Dream"	2020	—	—N/a	Non-album singles
"Our Christmas Wish For You" (겨울의 우리들) with Antenna artists	2020	107	—N/a	2020 Antenna Christmas Carol
"Dreamy Alarm" (꿈 같은 알람)	2020	—	—N/a	Candy Pianist
"Hello Antenna, Hello Christmas" with Antenna artists	2021	124	—N/a	2021 Antenna Christmas Carol
"Rum Pum Pum" (람팜팜)	2022	—	—N/a	Rum Pum Pum single album
"Where the Wind Rises" (바람이 불어오는 곳)	2022	—	—N/a	A Daily Adventurer (일상모험歌); Ad campaign single
"—" denotes release did not chart.

=== K-pop Star 4 songs ===
Title	Original artist	Year	Peak chart positions	Sales	Album
Title	Original artist	Year	KOR	Sales	Album
"Time Slow Down" (시간아 천천히)	Original songs	2014	3	KOR: 425,801	K-pop Star Season 4 digital singles
"My Own Way" (마음대로)	Original songs	2014	2	KOR: 154,236	K-pop Star Season 4 digital singles
"Exciting Waltz" (두근두근 왈츠)	Original songs	2015	83	KOR: 18,950	K-pop Star Season 4 digital singles
"Yum Yum Yum" (냠냠냠)	Original songs	2015	9	KOR: 101,751	K-pop Star Season 4 digital singles
"Winter Rich" (겨울부자)	Original songs	2015	78	KOR: 20,325	K-pop Star Season 4 Top 10 Part 2
"Cheerleader Song" (치어리더 쏭)	Original songs	2015	—	—N/a	K-pop Star Season 4 Top 8
"My Reflection in My Heart" (내 마음에 비친 내 모습)	Yoo Jae-ha	2015	—	—N/a	K-pop Star Season 4 Top 6
"Reminiscence" (회상)	Sanullim	2015	—	—N/a	K-pop Star Season 4 Top 4 Part 2
"Already One Year (Live)" 벌써 일년) with Jung Seung-hwan	Brown Eyes	2015	69	KOR: 81,596	K-pop Star Season 4 Top 4 Part 2
"Road" (길)	g.o.d	2015	—	—N/a	K-pop Star Season 4 Top 3

=== Soundtrack appearances ===
Title	Year	Album
"Again and Again" (또또또)	2016	Weightlifting Fairy Kim Bok-joo OST
"Good Morning (Piano Solo)"	2017	The Lovebirds: Year 1 OST
"Good Night (Piano Trio)"	2017	The Lovebirds: Year 1 OST
"Fly Away"	2018	Shinbi Apartment: Birth of Ghost Ball X OST (season 2)
"Always with Us (Inspired by '파랑')"	2018	D Museum Weather exhibition OST
"School Episode: Walk Together"	2019	Music from Sound Garden digital singles
"Tongyeong Episode: To Cats"	2019	Music from Sound Garden digital singles
"Camping Episode: Let's Go Camping"	2019	Music from Sound Garden digital singles
"Stationary Store Episode: Stationary Store"	2019	Music from Sound Garden digital singles
"Photo Studio Episode: Self Portrait"	2019	Music from Sound Garden digital singles
"Love With You"	2020	Sweet Munchies OST
"Target for Love"	2021	Blue Archive OST

=== Other appearances ===
Title	Year	Album
"Who's Your Mama? (Soul Ver.)" J. Y. Park feat. Lee Jin-ah & Ji John	2015	24/34
"I Know Why Stars Twinkle" Lucid Fall (vocals by Lee Jin-ah)	2015	Someone, Somewhere
"Your Song" with Sam Kim, Jung Seung-hwan, Kwon Jin-ah	2016	I Am Sam
"I Love You, Be Happy" (사랑해 행복해)	2016	Melody to Masterpiece: Track 6
"Granny and Her Old Rocket" Peppertones with Lee Jin-ah	2016	Long Way
"Meet the Rose" (장미대선) Hyungdon and Daejun feat. Lee Jin-ah	2017	Non-album single
"You In My Arms" (그대 내 품에) Yoo Jae-ha cover	2017	Yoo Jae-ha 30th Anniversary: Forever as We Are
"Hope" (빛) H.O.T. cover	2019	You Hee-yul's Sketchbook 10th Anniversary Project: 19th Voice
"New Day" Sam Ock feat. Lee Jin-ah	2020	To Belonging
"Heat Haze" Younghotstuff feat. Lee Jin Ah Trio	2020	Paradox Life
"LAN Escape" The Blank Shop feat. Lee Jin-ah	2020	Tailor
"Stairs (Onstage Ver.)" (계단 (온스테이지 Ver.)	2020	Onstage 10th Anniversary - Only Onstage: 7
"I Wanna Be Loved" (사랑받고 싶어서) Deulrejang feat. Lee Jin-ah	2021	Non-album single

== Songwriting credits ==
The following credits are adapted from the Korea Music Copyright Association database.

List of songs written or co-written by Lee Jin-ah for other artists
Year	Title	Artist(s)	Album	Lyrics		Music		Arrangement	
Year	Title	Artist(s)	Album	Credited	With	Credited	With	Credited	With
2016	"Always"	Miiso	Good Night	No	—N/a	No	—N/a	Yes	Miiso
2018	"Singing Like a Wind" (바람 같은 노래를)	Jung Seung-hwan	Spring Again	No	—N/a	No	—N/a	Yes	—N/a
2018	"Think About You" (Prelude: 너를 생각해)	Yoo Seon-ho	Spring, Seonho	—N/a	—N/a	Yes	—N/a	Yes	—N/a
2018	"Maybe Spring" (봄이 오면)	Yoo Seon-ho	Spring, Seonho	Yes	—N/a	Yes	—N/a	Yes	—N/a
2018	"Your Song" (보고 싶어)	Yoo Seon-ho	Spring, Seonho	Yes	—N/a	Yes	—N/a	Yes	Jo Sang-jun, Park Hyun
2018	"Fine" (잘 지내요)	Jung Seung-hwan	Life OST	No	—N/a	Yes	—N/a	Yes	—N/a
2019	"Hide and Seek" (숨바꼭질)	Kwon Jin-ah	Shape of Me	No	—N/a	Yes	Hen, You Hee-yeol	Yes	Kwon Young-chan
2021	"First Love" (첫사랑)	Jung Joon-il feat. Sole	Non-album single	Yes	Jung Joon-il	No	—N/a	No	—N/a
2021	"For You, My Sunshine" (빛나는당신을위해)	Jukjae, Kwon Jin-ah	Ad campaign singles	Yes	—N/a	Yes	—N/a	Yes	—N/a
2021	"Walk Home with Me (Full Band Ver.)"	Jung Seung-hwan	Ad campaign singles	Yes	Kim Da-mi	Yes	—N/a	Yes	Seo Ju-young, Park Jong-woo
2021	"Walk Home with Me (Acoustic Ver.)"	Kwon Jin-ah	Ad campaign singles	Yes	Kwon Jin-ah	Yes	—N/a	Yes	—N/a
2021	"Adventure"	Kwon Jin-ah, Sam Kim	Ad campaign singles	Yes	Sam Kim, Kwon Jin-ah	Yes	Sam Kim, Kwon Jin-ah, An Kwang-hyun	Yes	Simon Petrén, An Kwang-hyun
2022	"Close the Door" (방문을 닫고)	Lee Soo-young	SORY	Yes	—N/a	Yes	—N/a	No	—N/a
2022	"Don't Ever Leave Me" (내곁에서 떠나지 말아요)	Sole	Seoul Check-in OST Part 8	Yes	Jung Joon-il	No	—N/a	No	—N/a
2022	"First Love" (처음 사랑해)	Jukjae	Ad campaign single	Yes	Jukjae	Yes	Jukjae	Yes	Jukjae
2022	"Frame" (액자)	Hong Jin-ho	Modern Cello	—N/a	—N/a	Yes	—N/a	—N/a	—N/a
2024	"Star to Start" (별의 왈츠)	Babylon (singer)	EGO 90'S PART 3	Yes	Babylon (singer)	Yes	—N/a	Yes	—N/a
2024	"First Love" (첫사랑)	Doyoung	First Love	Yes	Jung Joon-il	No	—N/a	No	—N/a

List of jingles written by Lee Jin-ah
Year	Title(s)	Artist	Show/Company
2016	"Logo Song"	Lee Jin-ah	Park Ji-yoon's Gayo Plaza
2018	"Jingle 1", "Logo Song 1"	Lee Jin-ah	EBS
2018	"Mallang Song" (말랑송), "Kulkul Song" (쿨쿨송)	Jung Seung-hwan	The Spring Home
2018	"Title Song", "Opening Song", "Ending Song", "Part 2 Signal"	Lee Jin-ah	Lee Jin-ah's Night Journey
2021	"Book Hangout" (책하고놀자)	Lee Jin-ah	Kim Seon-jae's Book Hangout

== Filmography ==
Year	Title	Type	Network	Notes	Ref.
2014–2015	K-pop Star Season 4	Television	SBS	Contestant	
2016	Melody to Masterpiece (노래의탄생)	Television	tvN	Series regular	
2019	Sound Garden (소리풍경)	Web show	Lululala Music	Host	
2019–2024	Lee Jin-ah's Night Journey	Radio	SBS Power FM	Host	
2021	Clumsy Antenna (우당탕탕 안테나)	Web show	Kakao TV	Main cast (with Antenna artists)	

== Awards and nominations ==
Award-giving body	Year	Category	Nominated work	Result	Ref.
Korean Music Awards	2018	Best Pop Album	Random	Nominated	
Korean Music Awards	2019	Best Pop Album	Jinah Restaurant Full Course	Nominated	
Korean Music Awards	2024	Album of the Year	Hearts of the City	Nominated	
Korean Music Awards	2024	Best Pop Album	Hearts of the City	Won	
