= Lee Soo-jung =

Lee Soo-jung Crystal Yi
- Also known as: Chai
- Born: June 1993 (age 33)
- Genres: R&B; soul; pop
- Occupations: Singer; Songwriter; Voice Actor
- Years active: 2015–present

Korean name
- Hangul: 이수정
- Hanja: 李秀晶
- RR: I Sujeong
- MR: I Sujŏng

Crystal Yi (born 1993), known by her stage name Chai or her Korean name Lee Soo-jung (이수정), is an American singer-songwriter. She is best known for winning SBS's K-pop Star 5.

== Career ==
In 2015–2016, Yi participated in the fifth season of the audition talent show K-pop Star. She finished in first place with a perfect score of 300 points and selected Antenna as her agency.

After winning the competition, she returned to Chicago to finish her senior year as an art major at the University of Illinois at Chicago. During this time, in February 2017, she self-released the single "Color You", featuring the Chicago-based duo Iris Temple. In April 2017, she released a music video for "Thirst Trap", a single she had originally released in 2015 prior to joining K-pop Star.

In September 2017, she took part in Antenna's label concert series With Antenna, which toured South Korea and the US. Later that year, she featured on the winter duet single "When You Fall" with Sam Kim. She released an OST for the drama Angel's Last Mission: Love in May 2019.

Yi made her official Korean debut with the single album Give and Take in June 2019. The album consisted of three songs: "Alright", which she co-produced with Sam Ock; the title track "Give and Take", featuring pH-1; and "Color You", featuring Sam Kim, a remake of her 2017 single. Her second single album, Gimme That, featured two songs produced by Colde and was released in February 2020.

Yi parted ways with Antenna in May 2021, after four years with the company. She signed to World Star Entertainment in July 2021. Yi mentioned in her YouTube channel that she eventually left World Star Entertainment to take a step back from being a full time musician.

== Discography ==
=== Single albums ===
Title	Album details	Track listing
Give and Take	Released: June 19, 2019; Label: Antenna; Formats: Digital download	1. "Alright"; 2. "Give and Take" (feat. pH-1); 3. "Color You" (feat. Sam Kim)
Gimme That	Released: February 28, 2020; Label: Antenna; Formats: Digital download	1. "Gimme That" (feat. Saay) (prod. Stally, Colde); 2. "Boyfriend" (feat. Khakii) (prod. Colde)

=== Digital singles ===
==== As lead artist ====
- "Thirst Trap" (2015)
- "Color You" (feat. Iris Temple, 2017)
- "Time's Up" (2021)
- "Wondering" (2021)

==== Soundtrack appearances ====
- "Oh My Angel" (Angel's Last Mission: Love, 2019)
- "Gift" (Dali & Cocky Prince, 2021)

==== Collaborations ====
- "Everything is Okay" (with Antenna artists, 2020)
- "Our Christmas Wish for You" (with Antenna artists, 2020)
- "Deserve Better" (with MRSHLL, 2021)

==== As featured artist ====
- "When You Fall" (Sam Kim feat. Chai, 2018)
- "God Be My Witness" (Uzuhan feat. Chai, 2019)

=== Album appearances ===
- Lee Jin-ah with Sam Kim, Kwon Jin-ah, Jung Seung-hwan and Chai – "We Are" (Jinah Restaurant Full Course, 2018)
- Lucid Fall feat. Chai – "Pit-a-pat" (Nowana, 2019)
- Dolly Ave feat. Chai & Always Dime – "Try" (Sleep, 2021)

=== Other charted songs ===
Title	Year	Chart peak	Sales	Album
Title	Year	KOR	Sales	Album
"Lies" (거짓말)	2016	48	KOR: 31,916	K-pop Star 5 OST
