= DdeunDdeun =

South Korean YouTube channel

YouTube information
- Channel: 뜬뜬 DdeunDdeun
- Years active: 2022–present
- Genres: Talk Show; Variety; Comedy; Travel
- Subscribers: 3.4 million
- Views: 1.3 billion
- Last updated: 11 November 2026

DdeunDdeun (Korean: 뜬뜬) is a South Korean YouTube Channel founded on November 15, 2022, known for its main show 'Pinggyego' featuring Yoo Jae-suk as the main host. It was established by Antenna Plus, an independent entertainment studio under the agency Antenna.

== History ==
On November 15, 2022, DdeunDdeun was established by 'Antenna Plus', an independent entertainment studio under the agency Antenna. The channel launched with its first program 'Pinggyego' (Just an Excuse) through a video titled 'Explanation_Video_with_Explanation_of_Excuses.mp4'. The video featured Yoo Jae-suk explaining the channel's direction of producing a web variety show featuring various artists.

On June 28, 2023, in less than a year since opening, the channel surpassed 1 million subscribers. On December 11, DdeunDdeun was named as YouTube Korea's fourth 'Most Popular YouTube Creator" and third 'Most Popular Video' for the video titled 'The Lunar New Year Holiday is an Excuse'. On December 17, 2023, DdeunDdeun held its first 'Pinggyego Awards Ceremony' to celebrate the channel's first anniversary.

On November 28, 2024, Pinggyego was one of the winners of the '2024 Viewers' Choice Variety Show of the Year' at the KCA Culture and Entertainment Awards Ceremony. On December 20, Pinggyego wins the 'Best IP in Media' awarded at Kakao Entertainment's first in-house year-end awards ceremony, 'ENTOP AWARDS 2024'.

On May 5, 2025, Punghyanggo won the 'Best Entertainment Award' in broadcast category at the 61st Baeksang Arts Awards. On December 9, DdeunDdeun was again one of the winners for '2025 Viewers' Choice Variety Show of the Year' at the KCA Culture and Entertainment Awards Ceremony.

== Programs ==
=== Pinggyego (핑계고) ===
'Pinggyego' (Just an Excuse), is the channel's main program, featuring Yoo Jae-suk engaging in casual conversations with guests through small stories and lighthearted banter. Each episode runs for approximately 50 minutes and features minimal editing and subtitles, deviating from the trend of short-form content and heavily edited variety shows. The show has featured a diverse range of guests, including Lee Dong-wook, Jee Seok-jin and Cho Se-ho, among others.

=== Bbam Bbam Social Club (빰빰소셜클럽) ===
BBam Bbam Social Club is a program in which the cast enjoys drinks while exploring both classic and contemporary “MZ” (Millennial and Generation Z) social games. The show features six cast members: Joo Woo-jae, Monsta X's Joohoney, Lee Yong-joo, Aiki, Park Se-mi and The Boyz's Sunwoo. The first episode was released on February 10, 2023.

=== Mini Pinggyego ===
Mini Pinggyego is a spinoff of 'Pinggyego', featuring a shorter format and a more intimate setting. It premiered on March 1, 2023.

=== Silbi House (실비집) ===
Silbi House is a cooking program hosted by comedian Nam Chang-hee, showcasing a relaxed atmosphere centered around food and conversation. The first episode was released on July 18, 2023.

=== Gyewon of the Month ===
Gyewon of the month is a spin-off series featuring guests from 'Pinggyego' hosting their own episodes in the channel. The first episode released on January 31, 2024, with subsequent episodes airing at the end of the following months.

=== Morning Colatheque ===
Morning Colatheque is an early morning event that transformed the Antenna Plus Office into a small club. Yoo Jae-suk served as the main DJ alongside performers Jo Hye-run, Dynamic Duo and comedian Yoon Seong-ho. The event also featured guests including Sakura and Kim Chae-won of Le Seraphim, Park Bo-young, Im Soo-jung, K.Will and others. The episode was released on April 27, 2024.

=== PunghyangGo ===
PunghyangGo is a travel program featuring Yoo Jae-suk traveling with fellow cast members to foreign destinations. The title and concept came from a mispronunciation of 'Pinggyego by the guest, Hwang Jung-min. The title is a play on words meaning “going where the wind blows,” reflecting the show's theme of spontaneous, app-free travel.

The first season premiered on November 24, 2024, featuring Yoo Jae-suk, Hwang Jung-min, Jee Seok-jin and Yang Se-chan on a trip to Hanoi and Sa Pa, Vietnam.

On January 24, 2026, the second season was released, featuring original cast members, Yoo Jae-suk, Jee Seok-jin and Yang Se-chan, joined by a new member, Lee Sung-min. The group traveled to Budapest, Hungary and Vienna, Austria.

=== Kkangchon Kangs (깡촌캉스) ===
Kkangchon Kangs is a travel program featuring Yoo Jae-suk alongside Lee Dong-wok, Nam Chang-hee and Lee Sang-yi as they travel for a vacation in a rural village at Uiseong, Gyeongbuk. The first episode was released on May 24, 2025.

On November 21, 2026, season 2 of the show was released featuring the same cast in a trip to Boryeong, South Chungcheong Provice,

=== Closet Cleaner Reboot ===
Closet Cleaner Reboot is a fashion talk variety show featuring Key, who reviews guests’ wardrobes and provides styling suggestions. The first episode was released on November 21, 2025. The show was later cancelled following Key's involvement in a controversy.

=== Wanna Go Eat Ramen? (라면 먹고 올래?) ===
Wanna Go Eat Ramen? is a travel and food variety show starring Yoo Jae-Suk, Kim Nam-gil, Yoon Kyung-ho and Ju Ji-hoon. The program follows the four cast members on a spontaneous one-day trip around Incheon, travelling by car and motorcycles while conversing and visiting various locations to eat ramen. The first episode premiered on July 11, 2026.

=== Punghyangjung (풍향중) ===
On August 1, 2026, 'Punghyangjung', a spin-off of 'PunghyangGo' aired its first episode featuring a domestic road trip format. Continuing the original program's "No App, No Reservation" concept, the series introduced additional rules by prohibiting the use of GPS Navigation and expressways. The cast travelled toward the designated destination of Iksan, with their route determined by a spinning wheel. Along the way, they visited and introduced cities of Asan, Gongju, and Nonsan, before making detours to Gunsan and Boryeong. The program stars Yoo Jae-Suk, Jee Seok-jin, Yang Se-chan and Lee Sung-min.

On August 20, Iksan City reported that the number of visitors from August 15 to 17 had increased more than three fold compared to the previous week, following the release of the episodes. The series was also credited with contributing to the revitalization of local economies of the locations featured in the program.

== Events and Ceremonies ==
=== Pingyego Awards Ceremony (핑계고 시상식) ===
Pinggyego Awards Ceremony is a year end event organized by the DdeunDdeun channel. It was first held on December 17, 2023, in celebration of the channel's first anniversary. The ceremony later became an annual event. Nominees are selected from guests who appeared in Pinggyego episodes and its spin-offs, as well as from the episodes themselves. Winners are determined through online voting for the Grand Prize, while other categories are decided through a combination of online votes and third-party judges.

==== 2023 ====
List of Winners and Nominees of the 1st Pinggyego Awards

Category	Winner	Nominees	Ref.
Rookie of the Year	Yoo Yeon-Seok	Gong Yoo, Kim Eun-hee, Lee Yong-joo, Hoshi	
Popular Star Award	Lee Dong-wook and Nam Chang-hee	All guests who appeared in the 1st year shows	
Best Program	Lee Dong-wook and Nam Chang-hee of the episode: Lunar New Year's Holiday is an Excuse	All shows in the 1st year	
Excellence Award	Hong Jin-kyung	Kim Sook, Defconn, Yang Se-chan, Lee Dong-hwi, Jang Hang-jun, Cha Tae-hyun, and Haha	
High Excellence Award	Jee Seok-jin and Cho Sae-ho	Nam Chang-hee, Song Eun-i, Lee Dong-wook, Joo Woo-jae	
Grand Prize (Daesang)	Lee Dong-wook	Nam Chang-hee, Song Eun-i, Joo Woo-jae, Jee Seok-jin and Cho Sae-ho	

==== 2024 ====
List of Winners and Nominees of the 2nd Pinggyego Awards

Category	Winner	Nominees	Ref.
Rookie of the Year	Lee Sung-min	Kang Min-kyung, Park Bo-young, Jin Seon-kyu, Karina and Koo Kyo-hwan	
Popular Star Award	Shinee's Key and Kim Go-eun	All guests who appeared in the 2nd year shows	
Veteran Award	Jee Seok-jin and Hong Jin-kyung	Guests whose professional experience exceeds the calculated average of Year 2 episode guests	
Best Program	Lee Dong-wook, Gong Yoo and Jo Se-ho of the episode: Lunar New Year's Holiday is Just Another Excuse	All shows in the 2nd year	
Excellence Award	Lee Sang-yi	Gong Yoo, Kim Won-hee, Lee Kwang-soo, Jo Hye-ryun, Cha Seung-won, Key, and Hong Jin-kyung	
High Excellence Award	Lee Dong-hwi	Nam Chang-hee, Yang Se-chan, Lee Dong-wook, Cho Sae-ho, Jee Seok-jin, and Hwang Jung-min	
Grand Prize (Daesang)	Hwang Jung-min	Nam Chang-hee, Yang Se-chan, Lee Dong-wook, Cho Sae-ho, Jee Seok-jin and Lee Sang-yi	

==== 2025 ====
List of Winners and Nominees of the 3rd Pinggyego Awards

Category	Winner	Nominees	Ref.
Rookie of the Year	Yoon Kyung-ho	Kim So-hyun, Na Young-seok, Song Seung-heon, Lee Jun-hyuk and Han Sang-jin	
Rising Popular Star Award	Lee Kwang-soo and Hong Hyun-hee	Guests whose professional experience remain below the calculated average of Year 3 episode guests	
Veteran Popular Award	Lee Dong-wook and Hong Jin-kyung	Guests whose professional experience exceeds the calculated average of Year 3 episode guests	
Best Program	Lee Dong-wook, Lee Kwang-soo and Yang Se-chan of the episode: Guaranteed Laughs is Just an Excuse	All shows in the 3rd year	
Excellence Award	Cha Tae-hyun	Ko Kyung-pyo, Lee Sung-min, Lee Kwang-soo, Joo Woo-jae, Ji Ye-eun, and Hong Hyun-hee	
High Excellence Award	Lee Hyo-ri	Song Eun-i, Lee Kwang-soo, and Lee Byung-hun	
Grand Prize (Daesang)	Jee Seok-jin	Nam Chang-hee, Yang Se-chan, Cho Sae-ho	

== Other Works ==
=== Mechanism ===
'Mechanism' is a music group formed through 'Pinggyego', composed of comedian Jo Hye-run and music duo Peppertones. The group debuted on May 21, 2025, with the title track "Broken Time Machine" and secondary track "NA PI! (π)". The official music videos were released through the DdeunDdeun YouTube channel.

== Awards and nominations ==
Year	Award	Category	Nominee	Result	Ref.
2023	YouTube Media Summit 2023	봐도 봐도 보고싶샹	뜬뜬 DdeunDdeun	Won	
2023	YouTube Media Summit 2023	현장 인기투표상 (On-site Popularity Award)	뜬뜬 DdeunDdeun	Won	
2024	The 29th Consumers' Day KCA Culture and Entertainment Awards Ceremony	Viewers' Choice Variety Show of the Year Award	Pinggyego	Won	
2024	ENTOP AWARDS	Best IP in Media	Pinggyego	Won	
2025	61st Baeksang Arts Awards	Best Entertainment Award	PunghyangGo	Won	
2025	The 30th Consumers' Day KCA Culture and Entertainment Awards Ceremony	Viewers' Choice Variety Show of the Year Award	PunghyangGo	Won	
