= Jung Seung-hwan (singer) =

South Korean singer (born 1996)

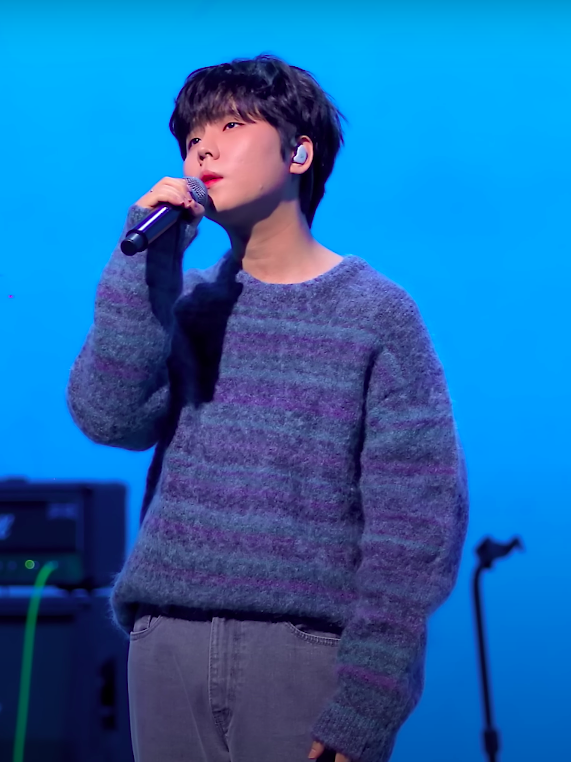
- Jung in 2023

Background information
- Born: August 21, 1996 (age 30); Sabuk-eup, Jeongseon County, Gangwon Province, South Korea
- Genres: Korean ballad; K-pop
- Occupation: Singer
- Years active: 2014–present
- Label: Antenna

Korean name
- Hangul: 정승환
- Hanja: 鄭承煥
- RR: Jeong Seunghwan
- MR: Chŏng Sŭnghwan

Jung Seung-hwan (Korean: 정승환; born August 21, 1996) is a South Korean singer.

== Career ==
Before Jung made his debut, he became popular with his hit OST "If It Was You" (너였다면). He gained wider attention for placing second in the fourth season of SBS' K-pop Star. He is best known for his cover performance of Kim Johan's "I Want to Fall in Love" (사랑에 빠지고 싶다) on K-pop Star 4 and charted in the Melon Charts for weeks. Throughout his career, he has released several OSTs that have charted. He made his debut in November 2016 with the EP His Voice and later released his full studio album Spring Again, in February 2018. In April 2019, he released his second EP Dear, My Universe. In May 2021, he released his third EP Five Words Left Unsaid.

Several media outlets have given him the nickname "Ballad's Park Bo-gum".

== Personal life ==
Jung applied to the Army Military Band and would enlist on July 17, 2023 after receiving his final acceptance notice from the Manpower Administration. Jung completed his military service and was discharged on January 16, 2025.

== Discography ==
=== Studio albums ===
Title	Album details	Peak chart positions	Sales
Title	Album details	KOR	Sales
Spring Again (그리고 봄)	Released: February 19, 2018; Label: Antenna; Format: CD, digital download; Track listing: 1. You Are My Spring (다시, 봄); 2. The Snowman (눈사람); 3. It's Raining (비가 온다); 4. Excuses (변명); 5. Shall We Walk Together? (사뿐); 6. Timeline (타임라인); 7. Still Here (제자리); 8. Tumbling Doll (오똑이); 9. Singing Like A Wind (바람 같은 노래를); 10. At The End Of The Day (이 노래가)	8	KOR: 7,100
Called Love (사랑이라 불린)	Released: October 30, 2025; Label: Antenna; Format: CD, digital download; Track listing: 1. Called Love (사랑이라 불린); 2. Prayer (앞머리); 3. The Way You Loved (그런 사랑); 4. Without You (행복은 어려워); 5. Incomplete (미완성); 6. Way To You (행성); 7. To US (우리에게); 8. Hug (품); 9. Moving On (넌 어떨까); 10. Our Story(여기까지)	35	KOR: 3,264

=== Extended plays ===
Title	Album details	Peak chart positions	Sales
Title	Album details	KOR	Sales
His Voice (목소리)	Released: November 29, 2016; Label: Antenna; Format: CD, digital download; Track listing: 1. Polaris (Prologue) (북극성 (프롤로그)); 2. Forest (숲으로 걷는다); 3. The Fool (이 바보야); 4. In That Winter (그 겨울); 5. The Voice (목소리); 6. Polaris (Epilogue) (북극성 (에필로그))	8	KOR: 7,471
Dear, My Universe (안녕, 나의 우주)	Released: April 18, 2019; Label: Antenna; Format: CD, digital download; Track listing: 1. Dear My Universe (안녕, 나의 우주); 2. The Voyager (우주선); 3. You're Coming (네가 온다); 4. Promise Me (믿어); 5. Going in Reverse (자꾸만 반대로 돼); 6. Behind You (뒷모습); 7. Ongnyeon-Dong (옥련동)	10	KOR: 5,132
Five Words Left Unsaid (다섯 마디)	Released: May 26, 2021; Label: Antenna; Format: CD, digital download; Track listing: 1. The Spring Day Passes (봄을 지나며); 2. We, From The First (친구, 그 오랜시간); 3. Thinking of You (그런 사람); 4. If You Are With Me (그대가 있다면); 5. Love Letter (러브레터)	29	

=== Singles ===
Title	Year	Peak chart positions		Sales (DL)	Album
Title	Year	KOR Circle	KOR Hot 100 (Note: The K-pop Hot 100 was discontinued on July 16, 2014. The chart was later re-established following the term date of May 29 – June 4, 2017.)	Sales (DL)	Album
Pre-debut
"I Want to Fall in Love" (사랑에 빠지고 싶다)	2014	1	—N/a	KOR: 1,020,363+	K-pop Star Season 4 I Want to Fall in Love
"I Have to Forget You" (슬픔 속에 그댈 지워야만 해) (with Park Yoon-ha)	2015	1	—N/a	KOR: 682,898+	K-pop Star Season 4 Casting Audition Part.1
"Those Days" (그날들)	2015	20	—N/a	KOR: 86,982+	K-pop Star Season 4 TOP10 Part.1
"Running Across the Sky" (하늘을 달리다)	2015	—	—N/a	—N/a	K-pop Star Season 4 TOP8
"Love That Guy" (사랑 그 놈)	2015	— (Note: "Love That Guy" did not enter the Gaon Digital chart top 100, but debuted and peaked at number 83 on the Gaon Download Chart.)	—N/a	KOR: 15,556+	K-pop Star Season 4 TOP6
"Please" (제발)	2015	41	—N/a	KOR: 41,856+	K-pop Star Season 4 TOP4 Part.1
"Already One Year" (벌써 일년) (with Lee Jin-ah)	2015	69	—N/a	KOR: 81,596+	K-pop Star Season 4 TOP4 Part.2
"Walk to Remember" (기억을 걷다)	2015	39	—N/a	KOR: 40,260+	K-pop Star Season 4 TOP3
"What If" (만약에 말야)	2015	59	—N/a	KOR: 29,240+	K-pop Star Season 4 TOP2 Part.1
"Where You Need to Be" (니가 있어야 할 곳)	2015	—	—N/a	—N/a	K-pop Star Season 4 TOP2 Part.2
"Jamsu Bridge" (잠수교) (with J.Y Park)	2015	38	—N/a	KOR: 75,270+	Sing the Road #02
Post-debut
"The Fool" (이 바보야)	2016	1	—N/a	KOR: 986,175+	His Voice
"In That Winter" (그 겨울)	2016	13	—N/a	KOR: 164,407+	His Voice
"Tears" (눈물나게) (with Lee Si-eun)	2017	—	—N/a	—N/a	Non-album single
"The Snowman" (눈사람)	2018	8	6	—N/a	Spring Again
"It's Raining" (비가 온다)	2018	20	25	—N/a	Spring Again
"The Voyager" (우주선)	2019	67	—	—N/a	Dear, My Universe
"My Christmas Wish" (십이월 이십오일의 고백)	2019	7	8	—N/a	Non-album singles
"Whenever Wherever" (언제라도 어디에서라도)	2020	49	32	—N/a	Non-album singles
"Walking Along the Moon" (달을 따라 걷다 보면)	2020	—	—	—N/a	Ad campaign single
"Winter Again" (어김없이 이 거리에)	2020	47	—	—N/a	Non-album single
"We, From the First" (친구, 그 오랜시간)	2021	95	—	—N/a	Five Words Left Unsaid
"Promise" (그러니까)	2021	—	—	—N/a	Promise collaborative single album
"Walk Home with Me" (집에 같이 갈래)	2021	—	—	—N/a	Ad campaign single
"I Have a Lover" (애인 있어요) (Lee Eun-mi cover)	2021	—	—	—N/a	Cyworld BGM 2021
"Dear" (별)	2021	125	95	—N/a	Non-album singles
"And the End" (안녕이란 말)	2022	103	—	—N/a	Non-album singles
"A Common Excuse" (흔한 거짓말)	2022	110	—	—N/a	Non-album singles
"My Favorite Winter" (겨울이 좋아졌어)	2022	101	—	—N/a	Non-album singles
"Someday" (그런 날이 올까요)	2023	135	—	—N/a	Non-album singles
"It'll Pass" (언젠간 괜찮아질 이야기) (with Heize)	2023	75	—	—N/a	Non-album singles
"One More Day" (하루만 더)	2025	—	—	—N/a	Non-album singles
"As If" (마치 오늘처럼)	2026	121	—	—N/a	Non-album singles

=== Soundtrack appearances ===
Title	Year	Peak chart positions	Sales	Album
Title	Year	KOR	Sales	Album
"The Time We Were Not in Love" (너를 사랑한 시간)	2015	22	KOR: 239,065	The Time We Were Not in Love OST
"If It Was You" (너였다면)	2016	7	KOR: 2,500,000	Another Miss Oh OST
"Wind" (바람)	2016	49	KOR: 80,613	Moon Lovers: Scarlet Heart Ryeo OST
"An Ordinary Day" (보통의 하루)	2018	—	—N/a	My Mister OST
"Fine" (잘 지내요)	2018	20	—N/a	Life OST
"Because It's You" (그건 너이니까)	2019	—	—N/a	My Country: The New Age OST
"I Am You" (나는너야)	2019	—	—N/a	Hyena OST
"Day and Night" (낮과 밤)	2020	—	—N/a	Start Up OST
"The Wind Blows on a Star – Yugi Theme" (저 별에 바람 불어 - 유기 테마)	2021	—	—N/a	Blade & Soul 2 OST
"Belief"	2021	168	—N/a	Yumi's Cells OST
"Because You're Not Here" (푸르른 계절도 내겐 의미 없어요)	2021	68	—N/a	Now, We Are Breaking Up OST
"Get to You" (너에게 닿을게)	2023	122	—N/a	King the Land OST
"Night and Day" (그날 밤)	2023	143	—N/a	Castaway Diva OST
"It Might Not Be Saying I Love You" (사랑한다는 말이 아닐지는 몰라도)	2025	—	—N/a	Motel California OST
"What Else" (내가 뭘 더)	2025	—	—N/a	Crushology 101 OST
"If I Love Again" (다시 사랑한다면)	2025	189	—N/a	Just for Meeting You OST
"Every Moment"	2026	—	—N/a	The Practical Guide to Love OST
"Through the Moon"	2026	—	—N/a	Four Hands, Two Sonatas OST

=== Other charted songs ===
Title	Year	Peak chart positions	Album
Title	Year	KOR Gaon	Album
"You're My Spring" (다시, 봄)	2018	95	His Voice

=== Other appearances ===
Title	Year	Album
"Your Song" (Sam Kim with Lee Jin-ah, Jung Seung-hwan, Kwon Jin-ah)	2016	I Am Sam
"We Are" (우리 시작) (Lee Jin-ah with Sam Kim, Kwon Jin-ah, Jung Seung-hwan, Chai)	2018	Jinah Restaurant Full Course
"Eternal Christmas" (Lucid Fall featuring Jung Seung-hwan)	2019	Nowana
"One-Way" (너의 여행) (Yoon Jong-shin with Jung Seung-hwan)	2022	Non-album single
"Pass Away" (나를 떠나가는 것들) (Choi Baek-ho featuring Jung Seung-hwan)	2022	Moment

== Filmography ==
=== TV series ===
Year	Title	Network	Notes
2014–2015	K-pop Star 4	SBS	Contestant
2016–2017	King of Mask Singer	MBC	Contestant (ep. 91–92)
2017	Duet Song Festival	MBC	Contestant (ep. 37, 39)
2017–2020	Immortal Songs	KBS	Contestant (ep. 289, 295, 355, 360, 449)
2020	Begin Again Korea	JTBC	Main cast member (Season 4)
2020	Hidden Singer	JTBC	Panelist (Season 6, ep. 13)
2025	The Gentlemen's League 4	JTBC	Cast member

=== Web shows ===
Year	Title	Role	Notes	Ref.
2019	Sam Kim & Jung Seung-hwan Self Live Tour	Cast member	Travel show produced by Visit Singapore and Dingo Travel	
2021	Clumsy Antenna	Cast member	with Antenna artists	
2022	Gomak Boys	Cast member	with Paul Kim, Kim Min-seok, Ha Hyun-sang and Big Naughty	

=== Radio shows ===
Year	Title	Network	Role	Note	Ref.
2018–2020	Music Forest, This is Jung Seung-hwan (음악의 숲, 정승환입니다)	MBC FM4U	Host	April 9, 2018 – May 10, 2020	
2021	Beautiful Morning This is Kim Chang-wan (아름다운 이 아침 김창완입니다)	SBS Power FM	Special host	August 13 – August 15	

== Awards and nominations ==
Year	Award	Category	Nominee	Result	Ref.
2016	Gaon Chart Music Awards	Rookie of the Year	Jung Seung-hwan	Nominated	
2016	Gaon Chart Music Awards	Song of the Year (November)	"The Fool"	Nominated	
2017	Beautiful Mint Life Awards	Best Rookie	Jung Seung-hwan	Won	
2018	Genie Music Awards	Artist of the Year	Jung Seung-hwan	Nominated	
2018	Genie Music Awards	Male Artist Award	Jung Seung-hwan	Won	
2018	Genie Music Awards	Genie Music Popularity Award	Jung Seung-hwan	Nominated	
2018	Mnet Asian Music Awards	Best Vocal Performance – Solo	"The Snowman"	Nominated	
2018	Mnet Asian Music Awards	Song Of The Year	"The Snowman"	Nominated	
2018	Mnet Asian Music Awards	Album Of The Year	Spring Again	Nominated	
2020	Gaon Chart Music Awards	MuBeat Global Choice Award (Male)	Jung Seung-hwan	Nominated	
2020	Mnet Asian Music Awards	Best Vocal Performance – Solo	"My Christmas Wish"	Nominated	
2020	Mnet Asian Music Awards	Song Of The Year	"My Christmas Wish"	Nominated	

== K-Pop Star 4 performances ==
Release date	Song (Original artist)	Round
November 23, 2014	"This Pain Will Pass" (Kim Bum-soo)	Round 1 Talent Audition
December 7, 2014	"I Want To Fall in Love" (Kim Jo-han)	Round 2 Ranking Audition
January 11, 2015	"The Name That Hurts" (Ann)	Round 3 Team Mission (with Kim Dong-woo)
January 18, 2015	"I Have To Forget You" (Lee Hyun-woo)	Round 4 Casting Audition (with Park Yoon-ha)
February 1, 2015	"Too Painful Love Is Not a Love" (Kim Kwang-seok)	Round 5 Special stage
February 8, 2015	"Please" (Lee So-ra)	Round 6 Stage Audition
February 22, 2015	"The First Day" (Echo Bridge ft. Naul)	Round 6 Stage Audition Rematch
March 1, 2015	"Those Days" (Kim Kwang-seok)	Top 10
March 15, 2015	"Running Across the Sky" (Lee Juck)	Top 8 Live
March 22, 2015	"Love That Guy" (Bobby Kim)	Top 6 Live
March 29, 2015	"Please" (Wild Chrysanthemum)	Top 4 Live Round 1
March 29, 2015	"Already One Year" (Brown Eyes)	Top 4 Live Round 2 Special Stage (with Lee Jin-ah)
April 5, 2015	"Walk To Remember" (Kim Bum-soo)	Top 3 Live
April 5, 2015	"Farewell Under the Sun" (Park Jin-young)	Top 3 Live Collaboration Stage (with Miss A's Suzy)
April 12, 2015	"Where You Need To Be" (g.o.d)	Finals Round 1
April 12, 2015	"What If" (Noel)	Finals Round 2
