= Jukjae =

South Korean singer (born 1989)

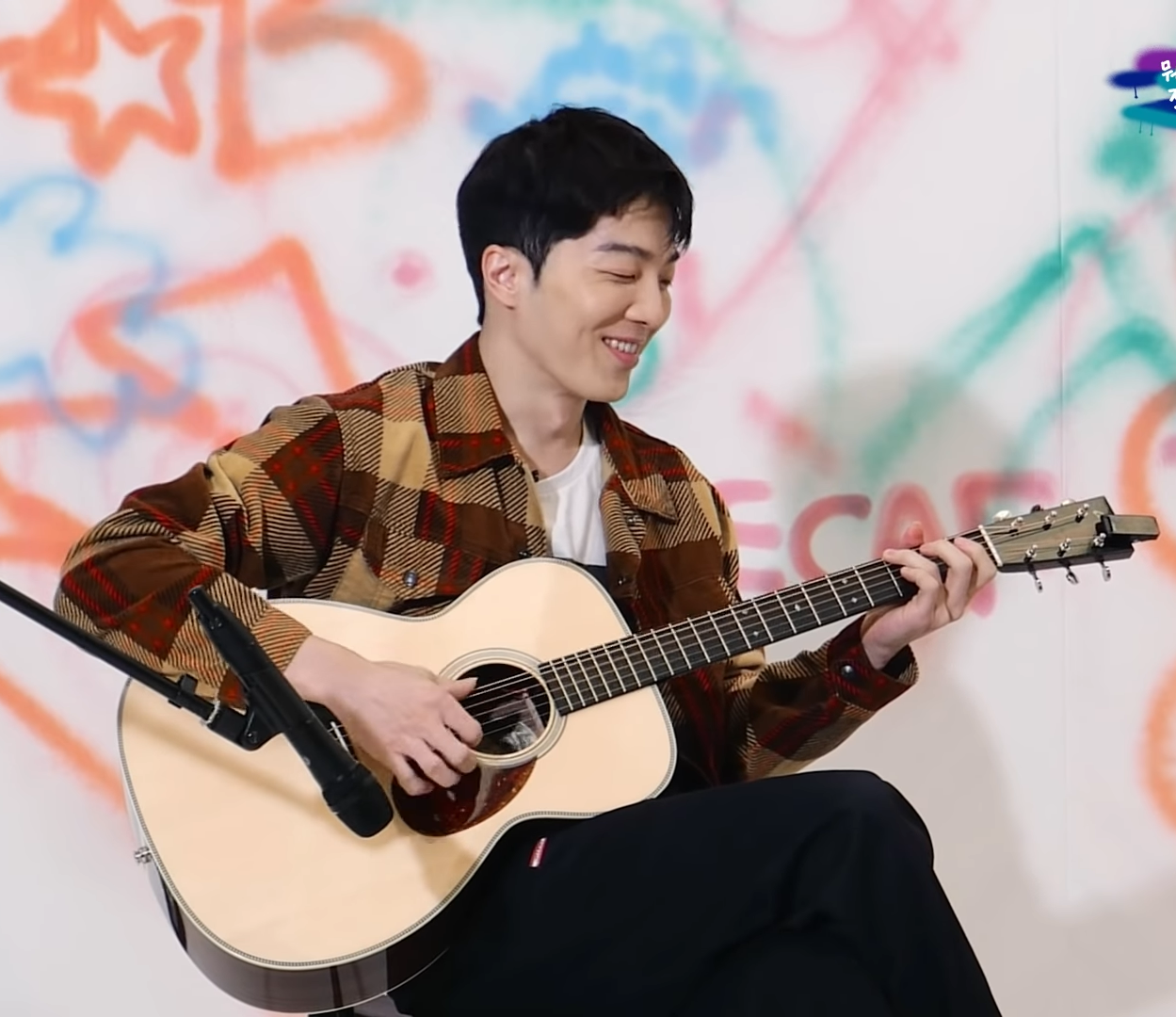
- Jukjae in 2021
- Born: Jeong Jae-won; January 26, 1989 (age 37); Gwangju, South Korea
- Education: Seoul Institute of the Arts
- Spouse: Heo Sung-yeon (m. 2025)
- Musical career
- Genres: Folk; K-pop; blues
- Occupations: Singer; songwriter; guitarist
- Years active: 2014–present
- Label: Abyss Company (2023–present)

Korean name
- Hangul: 정재원
- RR: Jeong Jaewon
- MR: Chŏng Chaewŏn

Stage name
- Hangul: 적재
- RR: Jeokjae
- MR: Chŏkchae

Jeong Jae-won (Korean: 정재원; born January 26, 1989), known professionally as Jukjae (적재), is a South Korean singer, songwriter and guitarist. He is affiliated with Abyss Company.

== Career ==
Jeong graduated from Seoul Institute of the Arts with a bachelor's degree in practical music in 2008 and began his musical career as a guitarist.

On November 10, 2014, Jukjae debuted with his first studio album, One Word (한마디). He also wrote the lyrics, composed the music, arranged, produced, sang, and played guitar on this album under the name Jeong Jaewon. The following year, on April 23, 2015, he released the digital single "사랑한대".

On March 9, 2017, Jukjae released his first EP, FINE. The title song, "Let's Go See the Stars," is one of Jukjae's signature songs, and became a hot topic after being covered by actor Park Bo-gum.

On June 29, 2019, he held his first solo concert in about three years, "One Step Further" (한걸음, 더), at the Seogang Merry Hall Grand Theater.

On September 1, 2020, Jukjae signed an exclusive contract with his agency, Antenna. On November 9, he released his second studio album, The LIGHTS, their first in about eight years. On November 12, he released his second EP, 2006. Jukjae described it as "an album that contains songs that best express my true colors." On December 4, he won the Best Session Award (Other Category) at the Melon Music Awards 2020.

On June 30, 2023, Jukjae's exclusive contract with Antenna ended. On July 3, he signed an exclusive contract with Abyss Company.

In December 2025, Fender Music Korea released the JUKJAE Stratocaster Baggy, the first signature guitar by a Korean artist.

== Personal life ==
In an interview, Jukjae said, "When we think of a band, we often think of the vocalist and the supporting musicians separately, but I want to be a musician who shows what it means to have both instruments and voices working in harmony and to make the most of both."

In addition to his singing career, Jukjae is also actively involved in music, arranging and playing guitar for albums and concerts by fellow musicians such as IU, Akdong Musician, Jung Eun-ji, Taeyeon, Ha Sung-woon, and Lim Han-byul. He was particularly active as the guitarist for the so-called "IU team" during IU's live sessions. Jukjae's activities as part of the IU team came to an end with the IU special episode of "Yoo Hee-yeol's Sketchbook," which aired on KBS2 on September 18, 2020.

In July 2025, Jukjae announced his marriage to Heo Sung-yeon, the older sister of Kara member Youngji. The wedding took place in October of the same year.

== Discography ==
=== Studio albums ===
List of studio albums, showing selected details
| Title | Details |
|---|---|
| One Word | Released: November 10, 2014; Label: Stomp Music; Formats: CD, digital download, streaming |
| The Lights | Released: November 9, 2022; Label: Antenna; Formats: CD, digital download, streaming |
| Cliché | Released: October 29, 2024; Label: Abyss Company; Formats: CD, digital download, streaming |

=== Extended plays ===
List of extended plays, showing selected details
| Title | Details |
|---|---|
| Fine | Released: March 9, 2017; Label: Stomp Music; Formats: CD, digital download, streaming |
| 2006 | Released: November 12, 2020; Label: Antenna; Formats: CD, digital download, streaming |
