= Antenna (record label) =

South Korean record label

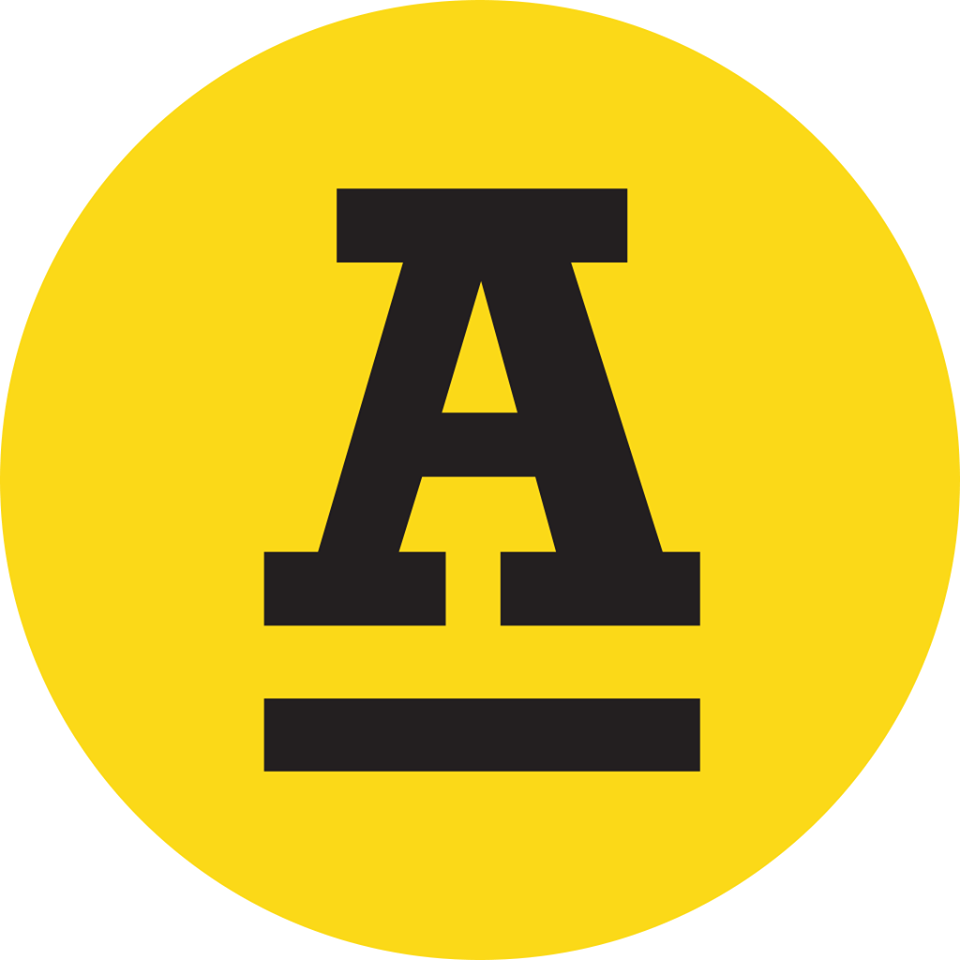
- Native name: (주)안테나
- Formerly: Toy Music (1997–2007); Antenna Music (2007–2014); Antenna Co. Ltd. (2015–present)
- Industry: Music; Entertainment
- Genre: K-pop; R&B; Soul; Jazz; Ballad; Folk; Modern rock; Classical; Ambient; EDM
- Founded: 1997
- Founder: You Hee-yeol
- Headquarters: 32-10, Eonju-ro 135-gil, Gangnam-gu, Seoul, South Korea
- Key people: You Hee-yeol (CEO)
- Owner: Kakao Entertainment (57.93%); You Hee-yeol (21.37%); Yoo Jae-suk (20.7%)
- Parent: Kakao Entertainment (since 2021)
- Divisions: Antenna Plus
- Website: antenna.co.kr

Antenna (Korean: 안테나) is a South Korean music and entertainment agency founded by You Hee-yeol of the project band Toy in 1997. Formerly an independent label, it was fully incorporated as a subsidiary under Kakao Entertainment in August 2021. Antenna is known for its motto: "Good people, good music, good laughter".

== History ==
=== 1997–2011: Formation and first generation of artists ===
South Korean musician You Hee-yeol, known as Toy, founded the indie record label "Toy Music" in 1997. In the early years, the label had produced and published several albums for artists including Lucid Fall, Kim Yeon-woo and You Hee-yeol himself as Toy.

In 2007, the label's name was changed from "Toy Music" to "Antenna Music". It means introducing music that is faithful to the essence of music and spreading good musical waves to everyone even if it is a small radio wave. In the same year, Antenna Music debuted South Korean rock band Dear Cloud.

In 2008, the modern electronic band Peppertones signed under Antenna Music. On September, Antenna Music signed pianist and film musician Jung Jae-hyung after completing his degree from the École Normale de Musique de Paris. Singer-songwriter Park Sae-byul debuted the same year under the agency.

In April 2010, the first label concert called "The Great Disappointment Show" was held as a gimmick to prove the best vocal artist of the agency.

In 2011, with the success of the first label concert, a second label concert was held called "Antenna Music Warriors: Yes, We Are Together", with a follow-up concert called "Encore Antenna Music Warriors Concert: Always, We Are Together".

=== 2013–2020: Second generation of artists and producers ===
From 2013 to 2017, You Hee-yeol served as a judge on Seasons 3–6 of the reality television competition show K-pop Star. During this time, Sam Kim, Kwon Jin-ah, Jung Seung-hwan, Lee Jin-ah and Lee Soo-jung signed to the label after successfully auditioning for the program and finishing in the top three of their respective seasons.

On July 7, 2015, the company restructured and rebranded from "Antenna Music" to "Antenna Co., Ltd", which is also known as just "Antenna".

On April 10, 2016, Sam Kim debuted with his EP called My Name is Sam. Lee Jin-ah then made her debut under the label with the single "I'm Full" on June 10. Kwon Jin-ah also made her debut with the full-length studio album called One Strange Night on September 19. On September 23–25, the third label concert was held called "Hello Antenna:The Label Concert". This is a joint concert between the "Antenna Warriors" (Seniors namely: You Hee-yeol, Jung Jae-hyung, Lucid Fall, Peppertones and Park Sae-byul) and "Antenna Angels" (Juniors namely: Sam Kim, Kwon Jin-ah, Jung Seung-hwan, Lee Jin-ah) with the exception of Lee Soo-jung who was in the U.S. at the time to focus on finishing her studies. On November 29, Jung Seung-hwan made his debut with the EP Voice.

In March 2017, "Antenna Angels", had their first joint concert named "We, Begin". Antenna had another label concert tour named "With, Antenna" where all the label artists performed for the first time in 5 cities both of South Korea and U.S. namely Seoul, Busan, Daegu, Los Angeles, and New York.

On March 18, 2019, Antenna announced that they had signed jazz pianist and producer Yun Seok-cheol. On June 19, Lee Soo-jung (Chai) released her first single under the label called, "Give and Take".

In 2020, with the difficulties caused by global pandemic COVID-19, the label held online contents and live streams under the tag "Everything is OK" with Antenna. A re-released song by Peppertones named "Everything Is OK" (with Antenna Ver.) became its theme song where the Antenna's artists participated. All proceeds were used for the purpose of overcoming COVID-19. On September 1, Antenna signed singer-songwriter and guitarist Jukjae. He was followed by composer and producer Seo Dong-hwan who joined on November 30. On December 20, Antenna's first agency Christmas carol named "Our Christmas Wish For You" was released that featured all their artists at that time.

=== 2021: Partnership with Kakao Entertainment ===
In March 2021, Antenna acquired a new office building located at Nonhyeon-dong, Gangnam-gu, Seoul. It is their first privately owned office building after 14 years. In May 2021, Kakao Entertainment acquired 19% of Antenna's shares, establishing a strategic partnership between the two companies. On May 1, Antenna announced Lee Soo-Jung's departure from the company. On July 14, Antenna had signed television personality Yoo Jae-suk, the first non-musician to be managed by the label. On August 1, Kakao acquired Antenna's remaining shares, making it a fully owned subsidiary. On October 1, Kakao TV's Dereumyi TV: Udang Tangtang Antenna (Clumsy Antenna) was aired as an entertainment project with the goal to promote and showcase the charm of Antenna's artists. On November 17, Antenna had signed singer, dancer, entertainer and Lovelyz member Mijoo. On December 1, Antenna released their second agency Christmas carol named "Hello Antenna, Hello Christmas" featuring all their artists and producers including newly signed Yoo Jae-suk and Mijoo.

=== 2022–2024: Agency expansion and new artists ===
On January 7, 2022, Antenna had signed producer from Superband 2 and member of Lofibaby, Meum, and THE FIX Hwang Hyeon-jo. On November 15, Antenna established an independent entertainment studio named Antenna Plus. As a start, a YouTube Channel called "Ddeun Ddeun" was opened to create a variety of content. On November 21, singer-songwriter, DJ, and guitarist Lee Sang-soon signed with the company.

On February 26, 2023, it was announced that Antenna had signed singer and television personality Lee Hyori following her husband Lee Sang-soon. On May 17, Mijoo had her debut single album under Antenna called Movie Star with a lead single of the same name and a ballad track, "Miss You". On June 30, Jukjae's contract expired and left Antenna. In July 2023, CEO You Hee-yeol bought back 21.37% of Antenna shares which was followed by Yoo Jae-suk buying 20.7% stake leaving Kakao Entertainment with 57.93% stake. On August 6, Antenna debuted a new artist, singer-songwriter and producer Drewboi (Park Jong-hyuk) with his single "Sunday". On August 7, Antenna announced that they had signed singer, musical theatre actor, and Super Junior member Cho Kyu-hyun. On October 12, Lee Hyori made her comeback with her first single under Antenna called "HOODIE E BANBAJI(후디에 반바지)". On November 1, Antenna officially signed its first actor Lee Seo-jin.

On January 9, 2024, Cho Kyu-hyun released a new EP called Restart; his first solo album under Antenna. On January 16, Antenna announced that they had signed all-round entertainer Yang Se-chan. On March 7, Jeju Air announced a business agreement with Antenna allowing both companies to collaborate on projects that would include production of in-flight music, Antenna wrapped aircraft, and making of joint online and offline contents. On March 8, Antenna announced Sam Kim's departure from the company after 10 years since his debut. On March 19, Antenna introduces their first boy band to debut called Dragon Pony consisting of four members: vocalist Ahn Tae-gyu, bassist Pyeon Seong-hyeon, guitarist Kwon Se-hyuk, and drummer Ko Kang-hoon. On May 16, Antenna's entertainment studio Antenna Plus launches another YouTube Channel "Ssook Ssook" (쑥쑥) featuring Yang Se-chan and the studio's production team members. On July 4, Lee Sang-soon released his first digital single under the company titled "Perfect Day" On September 5, Antenna announced Kwon Jin-ah's departure from the company after 10 years. On September 26, Antenna officially debuts their first rock band Dragon Pony, with the EP POP UP. Their debut marks the third generation of Antenna artists to debut.

=== 2025-Present: Artist Departure and announcement of new Girl Group ===
On April 16, 2025, Antenna announced Drewboi's end of contract with the company. On November 6, Antenna announces Mijoo's departure from the company.

On March 19, 2026, Antenna announced Lee Jin-ah and Yun Seok-cheol's departure from the company. On July 8, Antenna announced that the company is preparing to debut their first girl group in 2027. On August 25, Antenna announced that Dragon Pony's bassist, Pyun Sung-hyun, withdraws from the band and the agency.

== Artists ==
=== Soloists ===
- You Hee-yeol
- Lucid Fall
- Park Sae-byul
- Jung Jae-hyung
- Jung Seung-hwan
- Lee Sang-soon
- Lee Hyori
- Cho Kyu-hyun

=== Groups ===
- Peppertones
- Dragon Pony

=== Entertainer ===
- Yoo Jae-suk
- Yang Se-chan

=== Actors ===
- Lee Seo-jin

== Former artists ==
- Toy
  - Kim Yeon-woo
  - Yoon Jeong-oh
- Dear Cloud (2007)
- Lee Soo-jung (Chai) (2016–2021)
- Jukjae (2020–2023)
- Sam Kim (2014–2024)
- Kwon Jin-ah (2014–2024)
- Drewboi (2023–2025)
- Mijoo (2021–2025)
- Lee Jin-ah (2015–2026)
- Yun Seok-cheol (2019–2026)
- Dragon Pony
  - Pyun Sung-hyun (2024-2026)

== Antenna Plus (안테나 플러스) ==
Antenna Plus Logo

Antenna Plus, is an independent entertainment studio introduced in November 15, 2022. Through this division, the variety YouTube channels DdeunDdeun and SsookSsook were launched and are being produced.

== Label concerts and tours ==
- The Great Disappointment Show (2010)
- Antenna Music Warriors: Yes, we are together (2011)
- Encore Antenna Music Warriors Concert: Always, We Are Together (2011)
- Hello Antenna: The Label Concert (2016)
- Antenna Angels Concert: We, Begin (2017)
- With Antenna (2017 - label tour in 5 cities namely Seoul, Busan, Daegu, L.A. and New York)

== Shows ==
- Dereumyi TV: Udang Tangtang Antenna
