= Lucid Fall =

South Korean singer-songwriter (born 1975)

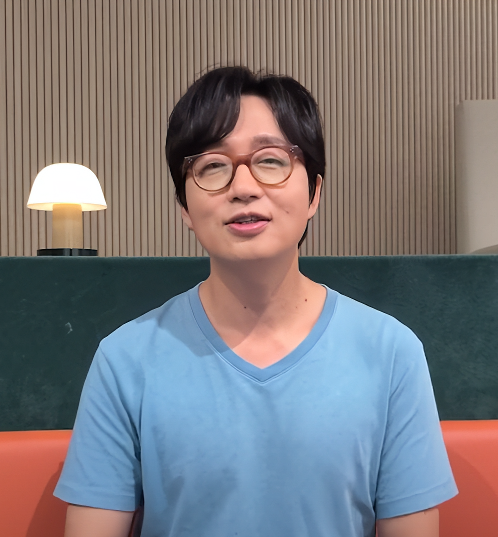
- Jo Yun-suk in 2021.

Background information
- Born: Jo Yun-suk; March 18, 1975 (age 51); Seoul, South Korea
- Genres: Folk; Pop; Ambient
- Occupation: Singer-songwriter
- Instruments: Vocals; guitar
- Years active: 2001–present
- Label: Antenna Music
- Spouse: Unknown (m. 2014)
- Website: mulgogi.net

Jo Yun-suk (Korean: 조윤석; born March 18, 1975), known by the stage name Lucid Fall (루시드폴), is a South Korean singer-songwriter. He began his music career in 1997 as a member of the band Misoni (미선이), but has been most prolific as a solo artist, having released eleven studio albums since 2001. Lucid Fall's musical style incorporates folk, pop, and bossa nova. Since getting married and moving to Jeju Island in 2014 and becoming a tangerine orchardist, his output has also included ambient compositions. He uses a nylon guitar as his primary instrument and is known for his poetic lyrics.

== Biography ==
Lucid Fall was born Jo Yun-suk in 1975 in Seoul, South Korea. His family moved to Busan where he spent most of his childhood and attended high school.

=== Musical career ===
In 1993, Lucid Fall won the bronze award at the 5th Yoo Jae-ha Music Contest (유재하 음악경연대회) with "A Song of Mirror". He formed the band Misoni in March 1997, serving as a lead vocalist and guitarist. They performed around Hongdae and eventually released their debut album Drifting in 1999. After Misoni halted activities due to members' military service, he formed the one-man band Lucid Fall and released the self-titled album Lucid Fall on Radio Music. He worked on the original soundtrack of the movie L'abri in 2002. In 2005, he released his second studio album, Oh, Love, with the album's title track winning the award for Best Pop Song at the 2006 Korean Music Awards. In 2007, he released a live album, Light of Songs, and a third studio album, A Night at the Border. In December 2022, he released the tenth studio album Voice Beside Guitar.

=== Research career ===
Lucid Fall graduated from Seoul National University majoring in chemical engineering in 1999. He moved to Europe for his study and received a licentiate of materials science at Royal Institute of Technology (KTH), Sweden in 2004. He then moved to Lausanne, Switzerland and got his PhD in bioengineering at École Polytechnique Fédérale de Lausanne (EPFL) in 2008, for research in drug delivery systems. His paper, "Micelles of Delivery of Nitric Oxide", was published in the Journal of the American Chemical Society in September 2009. Having spent seven years as a researcher, he returned to South Korea in late 2009 for a life as a full-time musician, no longer pursuing an academic career.

== Discography ==
=== Studio albums ===
- Lucid Fall (2001)
- Oh, Love (오, 사랑; 2005)
- Night at the Border (국경의 밤; 2007)
- Les Misérables (레미제라블; 2009)
- Beautiful Days (아름다운 날들; 2011)
- Flowers Never Say (꽃은 말이 없다; 2013)
- Someone, Somewhere (누군가를 위한; 2015)
- Living Small and Tiny Farm (모든 삶은, 작고 크다; lit. 'All of Life is Small and Big'; 2017)
- Nowana (너와 나; neowa na; lit. 'You and Me'; 2019)
- Dancing with Water (2021)
- Voice Beside Guitar (목소리와 기타; 2022)

=== Live albums ===
- Light of Songs (2007)

=== Soundtrack albums ===
- L'Abri (버스, 정류장; 2002)

== Filmography ==
=== Web show ===
Year	Title	Network	Notes	Ref.
2021	Clumsy Antenna	Kakao TV	Main cast (with Antenna artists)	

== Awards ==
Award	Year	Category	Nominee/work	Result	Ref.
Yoo Jae-ha Music Contest	1993	—N/a	"거울의 노래"	Bronze	
Korean Music Awards	2006	Best Pop Album	Oh, Love	Nominated	
Korean Music Awards	2006	Best Pop Song	"Oh, Love"	Won	
Korean Music Awards	2006	Song of the Year	"Oh, Love"	Nominated	
Korean Music Awards	2006	Musician of the Year (Male)	Lucid Fall	Nominated	
Korean Music Awards	2009	Best Pop Album	Night at the Border	Nominated	
Korean Music Awards	2009	Best Pop Song	"Night at the Border"	Nominated	
Korean Music Awards	2011	Best Pop Album	Les Misérables	Nominated	
Korean Music Awards	2023	Best Folk Album	Voice Beside Guitar	Nominated	
Korean Music Awards	2023	Best Folk Song	A Small Handful of Songs	Nominated	
