= You Hee-yeol =

South Korean musician (born 1971)

You Hee-yeol 유희열
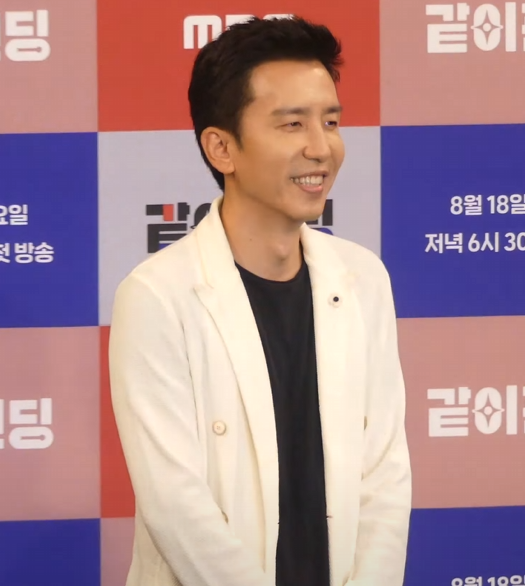
- Yoo Hee-yeol during MBC 'Funding Together' production presentation in 2019

Background information
- Born: April 19, 1971 (age 54)
- Origin: Seoul, South Korea
- Genres: Pop; adult contemporary
- Occupations: Singer-songwriter; disk jockey; television host
- Years active: 1992–present
- Labels: Antenna Music
- Website: antenna - You Hee-yeol

Korean name
- Hangul: 유희열
- Hanja: 柳喜烈
- RR: Yu Huiyeol
- MR: Yu Hŭiyŏl

You Hee-yeol (Korean: 유희열; born April 19, 1971) is a South Korean singer-songwriter, radio disk jockey, and the host of You Hee-yeol's Sketchbook. He is the founder of the record label Antenna Music and the sole member of the project band Toy.

== Early life ==
You was born in Seoul and attended Kyungbock High School. He graduated from Seoul National University's College of Music with a major in composition. He debuted in the local pop music scene by winning the grand prize at the fourth You Jae-ha Music Contest held in 1992 with "The Moonlight Song" (Korean: 달빛의 노래).

In 1994, You started the band Toy as a duo with Yoon Jeong-oh. However, after releasing Toy's first album, Yoon left the band to study overseas and You joined the navy for his mandatory military service. Since 1996, Toy has continued as a one-man band with You as the sole member. After his discharge from military service, Toy's second album Fairy Tales for Adults was released, with the title song "Remember I Was Next to You" sung by Kim Yeon-woo becoming a big hit. Since then, You has rarely sung the songs in his albums and instead features guest vocalists such as Kim Yeon-woo, Kim Hyung-joong, Lee Jang-woo, Yoon Jong-shin, Kim Jang-hoon, Jinu (also known as Hitchhiker), and Byeon Jae-won.

You has also produced many albums for K-pop musicians including Lee Seung-hwan, Yoon Jong-shin, Lee Sora and Lee Moon-se. In 1997, he founded the record label Antenna Music, then known as Toy Music.

In July 1999, You published a book of illustrations titled In Front of a Familiar House. The album of the same title contained instrumental tracks in a range of genres. Besides songwriting, You has worked as a radio DJ, appearing on MBC FM4U's Yoo Hee-yeol's Music City (1999–March 2001), MBC FM4U's All That Music (October 2, 2002 – April 25, 2004), and You Hee-yeol's Radio Heaven (2008–November 11, 2011) by KBS 2FM.

Since 2009, You has hosted the major K-pop live music program You Hee-yeol's Sketchbook on KBS 2TV. He was also a member of the judging panel for K-pop Star 3 (2013–14) and a member of the cast of Saturday Night Live Korea in September 2013. In 2015, he appeared in the music video for Psy's single "Daddy". Since 2015, he became a co-host with Yoo Jae Suk in Two Yoo Project Sugar Man.

On December 11, 2021, You was diagnosed with COVID-19, canceled all of his schedules and is taking necessary measures in accordance with quarantine agency guidelines. As of December 21, 2021, it was reported that Yoo had recovered from the infection as of December 19 after completing home treatment for COVID-19 according to a decision by health officials.

In 2022, You faced multiple allegations of plagiarism. After acknowledging the similarities between his song "Very Private Night" and "Aqua" by Japanese composer Ryuichi Sakamoto, the controversy continued over songs "Happy Birthday to You" (composed by You and performed by Sung Si-kyung) and "Time to Turn On". On July 18, 2022, You published an apology through his record label Antenna, announcing his intention to step down from his program You Hee-yeol's Sketchbook, and that he "will look after [himself] more strictly so that a controversy such as this does not arise again."

== Discography ==
- In Front of a Familiar House (익숙한 그 집 앞) (1999)
- A Walk Around the Corner (유희열이 초대하는 새로운 음악세계) (2002)
- Summer Days (여름날) (2008)

=== Singles ===
- "Mother's Sea" (엄마의 바다) (2014)

=== Music video ===
- IU - The Red Shoes (분홍신) (2013)
- Unnies (언니쓰) - Shut Up (2016)
- Sechs Kies (젝스키스) - Don't Look Back (뒤돌아보지 말아요) (2021)

=== Television shows ===
Year	Title	Role	Notes	Ref.
2009–2022	You Hee-yeol's Sketchbook	Host		
2020–2022	Sing Again	Judge	Season 1–2	
2021	Many Chat	Host	with Cha Tae-hyun	
2022	Famous Singers	Host	Season 2	
2022	New Festa	Host		

=== Web shows ===
Year	Title	Role	Notes	Ref.
2021	Clumsy Antenna	Main Cast	with Artist from Antenna	
2022	Take 1	Participant		

== Bibliography ==
- You Hee-yeol Illustrations - In Front of a Family House (유희열 삽화집 - 익숙한 그 집 앞)

== Awards ==
- 2015 MelOn Music Awards: Top 10 Artist (2015)
- 11th KBS Entertainment Awards: Best Entertainer Award in the Music Show category (2012)
- 9th KBS Entertainment Awards: Radio DJ Award (2010)
- 6th Korean Music Awards: Musician of the Year (2009)
- 6th Korean Music Awards: Best Pop Song – 뜨거운 안녕 (A Passionate Goodbye) (2009)
- 4th Yoo Jae-ha Music Contest: Grand Prize (1992)

=== Music show awards ===
==== KBS Music Bank ====
Year	Date	Song
2014	November 28	"Three People"
