= Peppertones =

South Korean musical group

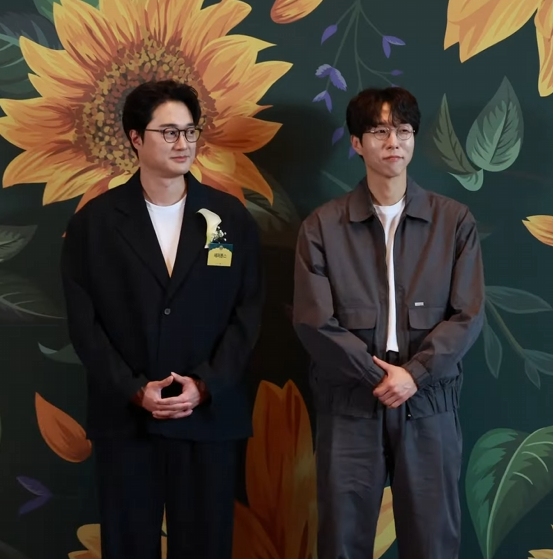
- Peppertones in 2024

Background information
- Origin: South Korea
- Genres: Indie rock; indie pop; Shibuya-kei; indietronica
- Years active: 2003–present
- Labels: Cavare Sound; Antenna Music
- Members: Shin Jae-pyung (Sayo); Lee Jang-won (Noshel)
- Website: www.peppertones.net

Peppertones (Hangul: 페퍼톤스), is a Korean rock band formed in 2003 by Shin Jae-pyung and Lee Jang-won. The pair met as computer science students at KAIST in Daejeon. The band's first EP album A Preview was released in 2004. They released their first album, Colorful Express, in 2005.

== Members ==
- Shin Jae-pyung (신재평) a.k.a. Sayo - guitar, vocals (born June 19, 1981)
- Lee Jang-won (이장원) a.k.a. Noshel - bass, vocals (born August 30, 1981)

== History ==
Shin Jae-pyung and Lee Jang-won both graduated from the Department of Computer Science at KAIST. The duo met as members of KAIST's Folk Club and Rock Club. Originally, Shin Jae-pyung was part of a pop band, while Lee Jang-won was part of a folk band. Lee Jang-won's band then was named "Triangular Rice Balls and Konjac Jelly" (삼각 주먹밥 과 곤약젤리) because he was eating just these two food items to save money to buy a guitar. Their respective bands took part in KAIST's creative song festival, which Lee Jang-won's band won. Following that, Shin Jae-pyung's band recruited Lee Jang-won.

The band built its reputation by performing live in Hongdae clubs with Deb and Westwind, who played the guest vocal roles. They released their first EP called A Preview in 2004 with the independent music label Cavare Sound. They were recognized by critics as the winner of the "Best Dance & Electronic Song" award for their song Superfantastic from their first album Colorful Express (2005) at the 4th Korean Music Awards in 2007. In September 2008, they moved to their current label, Antenna Music.

Sayo and Noshel are the stage names they used at the beginning of their debut, and they are now active under their real names. At the beginning of their career, their songs are sung by guest vocalists, notably Deb and Westwind. In their first album, Colorful Express (2005), they began singing on their own, with Shin mostly occupying the main vocal role and Lee as backing vocals.

Lee earned a Master of Business Engineering degree from KAIST's Business School and worked as an intern for Mirae Asset Management in late 2009. He is currently a doctorate student at KAIST's Graduate School of Culture and Technology. He is also currently active as a cast member of the TV show Problematic Men since 2015.

Shin was a radio DJ for the Our Beautiful Night Radio program on EBS FM from May 30 to August 28, 2011. He has also written songs for other artists, most notably K-pop girl group f(x), singer-actress Park Ji-yoon, and singer Baek A-yeon.

== Discography ==
=== Studio albums ===
Title	Album details	Peak chart positions	Sales
Title	Album details	KOR	Sales
Colorful Express	Released: December 16, 2005; Label: Cavare Sound; Formats: CD	—	—
New Standard	Released: March 25, 2008; Label: Cavare Sound; Formats: CD	23	KOR: 4,712
Sounds Good!	Released: December 17, 2009; Label: Antenna; Formats: CD, digital download	21	—
Beginner's Luck	Released: April 24, 2012; Label: Antenna; Formats: CD, digital download	9	KOR: 5,061
High-Five	Released: August 14, 2014; Label: Antenna; Formats: CD, digital download	7	KOR: 2,366
Long Way	Released: May 9, 2018; Label: Antenna; Formats: CD, digital download	16	KOR: 2,452
Thousand Years	Released: September 20, 2022; Label: Antenna; Formats: CD, digital download	47	KOR: 1,900
Twenty Plenty	Released: April 17, 2024; Label: Antenna; Formats: CD, digital download	22	KOR: 4,300
"—" denotes release did not chart.

=== Live albums ===
Title	Album details	Peak chart positions	Sales
Title	Album details	KOR	Sales
2014-2015 Two Lives	Released: August 3, 2016; Label: Antenna; Formats: CD, digital download	19	KOR: 1,109

=== Extended plays ===
Title	Album details	Peak chart positions	Sales
Title	Album details	KOR	Sales
A Preview	Released: March 23, 2004; Label: Cavare Sound; Formats: CD	—	—
Open Run	Released: November 15, 2012; Label: Antenna; Formats: CD, digital download	12	KOR: 2,144
"—" denotes release did not chart.

=== Digital singles ===
- "April Funk" (2005)
- "Thank You" (2013)
- "Campfire" (2015)
- "Someone Who Gives Me Happiness" (2021)
- "Tangerine" (2021)
- "Broken Time Machine" (2025)
  with Jo Hye-ryun as a collaboration group called "Mechanism"
- "NA PI ! (π)" (2025)
  with Jo Hye-ryun as a collaboration group called "Mechanism"

=== Soundtrack appearances ===
Year	Title	Album
2006	"In Changing Times" (변해간 세월속에서) feat. Cabinet Singalongs	Soulmate OST
2008	"Mr. Herman (The Greatest Comedian Ever)" with Miki of The Indigo	The Mystery of KK Island OST
2013	"Chance!"	Dating Agency: Cyrano OST
2019	"Fool"	The Secret Life of My Secretary OST
2022	"Shine"	Cheer Up OST

=== Compilation appearances ===
Year	Title	Album
2004	"Winterstalgia - Comet Mix Version"	Christmas Meets Cavare Sound
2007	"Hotdog!"	Story of Dogs
2008	"Runner's High"	Yoonsang Songbook: Play With Him!
2009	"ABC" with Arina of Mocca	Man and Woman… and the Story

== Filmography ==
Year	Title	Type	Notes	Ref.
2021	Clumsy Antenna	Web show	Main cast (with Antenna artists)	
2022	Great Seoul Invasion	Television shows	Consultant	

== Awards ==
Year	Awards	Category	Nominee/work	Result	Ref.
2007	Korean Music Awards	Best Dance & Electronic Song	"Superfantastic"	Won	
2007	Korean Music Awards	Best Dance & Electronic Album	Colorful Express	Nominated	
2012	Beautiful Mint Life Awards	Best Artist	Peppertones	Nominated	
2012	Beautiful Mint Life Awards	Best Performance	Peppertones	Won	
2013	Beautiful Mint Life Awards	Best Artist	Peppertones	Nominated	
2016	Beautiful Mint Life Awards	Best Artist	Peppertones	Nominated	
2016	Beautiful Mint Life Awards	Best Performance	Peppertones	Won	
2016	Grand Mint Festival Awards	Best Artist	Peppertones	Won	
2016	Grand Mint Festival Awards	Best Performance	Peppertones	Nominated	
2016	Grand Mint Festival Awards	Achievement Award (공로상)	Peppertones	Won	
2017	Beautiful Mint Life Awards	Best Artist	Peppertones	Nominated	
2017	Beautiful Mint Life Awards	Best Performance	Peppertones	Nominated	

== See also ==
- Antenna Music
