= Yerin Baek discography =

South Korean singer-songwriter

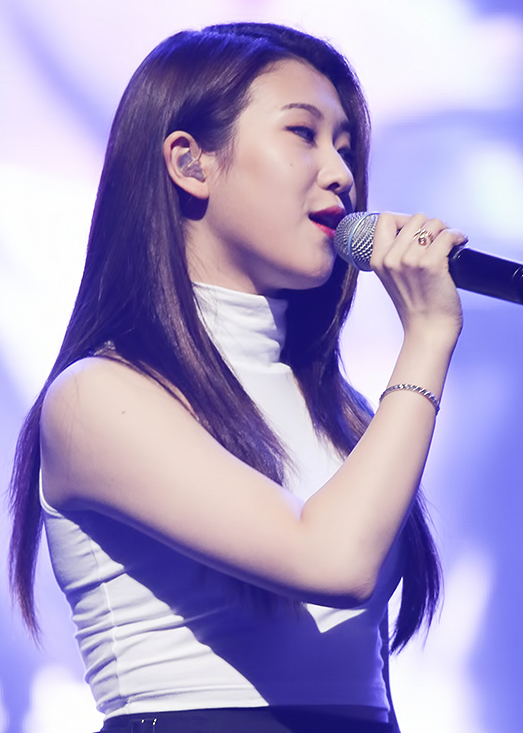
- Yerin Baek performing "Sugar" on July 10, 2014
- Studio albums: 2
- EPs: 4
- Live albums: 1
- Singles: 5

South Korean singer-songwriter Yerin Baek has released three studio albums, four extended plays (one remix EP and one cover EP), one live vinyl album, and several singles (including 15 as a featured artist). Baek has also participated in three soundtracks for television series.

Baek's solo career started with the release of her first extended play, Frank (2015), during the hiatus of her vocal duo 15&. Prior to and after the release of her EP, she was featured in multiple singles by different South Korean rappers, all of which peaked at number one on digital charts.

In 2016, Baek released her digital singles, "Bye Bye My Blue", and "Love You on Christmas". In 2018, she formed The Volunteers with members of the independent rock band Bye Bye Badman.

Baek released her second extended play, Our Love Is Great (2019), which won the Album of the Year and Best Pop Album at the 2020 Korean Music Awards, along with the lead track "Maybe It's Not Our Fault" winning Best Pop Song. Following Baek's end of contract with JYP, the vocal duo 15& officially disbanded and she continued with her solo career, releasing her first studio album Every Letter I Sent You (2019), a double album under her own independent label, Blue Vinyl. The album had 17 out of 18 songs sung in English, and it included the track "Square (2017)" which was a hot topic when a fan-taken performance of the song was uploaded to YouTube in 2017. The track became the first English single by a South Korean artist to top the charts. Baek was awarded Best Pop Album for Every Letter I Sent You at the 2021 Korean Music Awards.

One year after her first studio album, Baek released her second studio album Tellusboutyourself (2020). Six remixed tracks from the album were released through her third EP (and first remix EP), Tellusboutyourself Remixes (2021). She also released her fourth EP (and first cover EP), Love, Yerin (2021) on the same year.

In 2022, Baek released the digital single "Pisces".

In 2023, Baek released the digital single "New Year".

In 2025, Baek released the digital single "I Met Peejay".

Baek released her third studio album, Flash and Core(2025). It is her first studio album in about five years since her second studio album Tellusboutyourself (2020), with a total of 15 tracks.

== Albums ==
=== Studio albums ===
List of albums, showing selected details, selected chart positions, and sales figures
Title	Details	Peak chart positions	Sales
Title	Details	KOR	Sales
Every Letter I Sent You	Released: December 10, 2019; Label: Blue Vinyl, Dreamus Company; Formats: CD, LP, digital download, streaming	2	KOR: 35,000
Tellusboutyourself	Released: December 10, 2020; Label: Blue Vinyl, Dreamus Company; Formats: CD, digital download, streaming	7	KOR: 20,338
Flash and Core	Released: October 2, 2025; Label: peoplelikepeople; Formats: CD, digital download, streaming	10	KOR: 9,461

== Extended plays ==
List of extended plays, showing selected details, selected chart positions, and sales figures
Title	Details	Peak chart positions	Sales
Title	Details	KOR	Sales
Frank	Released: November 30, 2015; Label: JYP Entertainment, Studio J; Formats: CD, digital download, streaming	—	—
Our Love Is Great	Released: March 18, 2019; Label: JYP Entertainment, Studio J; Formats: CD, digital download, streaming	17	KOR: 3,000
Love, Yerin	Released: September 10, 2021; Label: Blue Vinyl, Dreamus Company; Formats: CD, digital download, streaming	15	KOR: 20,196
"—" denotes a recording that did not chart or was not released in that territory

== Singles ==
=== As lead artist ===
List of singles as lead artist, showing year released, selected chart positions, sales figures, and name of the album
Title	Year	Peak chart positions		Sales (DL) (Note: Gaon Chart no longer releases download sales figures from January 2018 onwards.)	Certifications (Note: In April 2018, the Korea Music Content Association introduced music recording certifications for albums and singles.)	Album
Title	Year	KOR	KOR Hot	Sales (DL)	Certifications	Album
"Across the Universe" (우주를 건너)	2015	7	—N/a	KOR: 1,116,655	—N/a	Frank
"Bye Bye My Blue"	2016	3	—N/a	KOR: 2,500,000	—N/a	Non-album singles
"Love You on Christmas"	2016	22	42	KOR: 114,795	—N/a	Non-album singles
"Maybe It's Not Our Fault" (그건 아마 우리의 잘못은 아닐 거야)	2019	1	3	—N/a	—N/a	Our Love Is Great
"Suddenly" (어느 새) (Digging Club Seoul version)	2019	—	—	—N/a	—N/a	Non-album single
"Popo (How Deep Is Our Love?)"	2019	24	25	—N/a	—N/a	Every Letter I Sent You
"0310"	2019	37	28	—N/a	—N/a	Every Letter I Sent You
"Square (2017)"	2019	1	1	—N/a	KMCA: Platinum (Note: "Square (2017)" was certified platinum for streaming in September 2022.)	Every Letter I Sent You
"Hate You"	2020	56	53	—N/a	—N/a	Tellusboutyourself
"0415"	2020	108	72	—N/a	—N/a	Tellusboutyourself
"Why Me?" (왜? 날)	2021	78	—	—N/a	—N/a	Love, Yerin
"A Walk" (산책)	2021	26	—	—N/a	—N/a	Love, Yerin
"The Other Side" (너머) (with Monika and Lip J)	2022	148	—	—N/a	—N/a	Non-album singles
"Pisces" (물고기)	2022	91	—	—N/a	—N/a	Non-album singles
"Fuckin' New Year"	2023	110	—	—N/a	—N/a	Non-album singles
"Big World"	2023	137	—	—N/a	—N/a	Non-album singles
"1-4-3"	2025	144	—	—N/a	—N/a	Non-album singles
"—" denotes a recording that did not chart or was not released in that territory

=== As featured artist ===
List of singles as featured artist, showing year released, selected chart positions, sales figures, and name of the album
Title	Year	Peak chart positions	Sales (DL)	Album
Title	Year	KOR	Sales (DL)	Album
"It's Only You" (Taecyeon of 2PM featuring Baek Ye-rin)	2014	—	—N/a	Genesis of 2PM
"Suddenly" (문득) (with Jun. K of 2PM & Jo Kwon)	2014	—	—N/a	JYP Nation Korea 2014 – One Mic
"Excited" (Olltii featuring Baek Ye-rin)	2015	—	—N/a	Graduation
"On & On" (Yuk Ji-dam featuring Baek Ye-rin)	2015	20	KOR: 155,875	Unpretty Rapstar Semi-final 2
"Chocolate" (チョコレート) (Taecyeon of 2PM featuring Baek Ye-rin)	2015	—	—N/a	2PM of 2PM
"Me You" (San E featuring Baek Ye-rin)	2015	2	KOR: 1,127,476	The Boy Who Cried Wolf
"Come Over" (넘어와) (Dean featuring Baek Ye-rin)	2017	6	KOR: 827,673	Limbo
"Light" (The Quiett featuring Baek Ye-rin)	2017	—	—N/a	Millionaire Poetry
"How Did You?" (너는 어떻게) (Ku One Chan featuring Baek Ye-rin)	2018	—	—N/a	Non album-singles
"Doodle" (낙서) (Punchnello featuring Baek Ye-rin)	2019	84	—N/a	Non album-singles
"Nerdy Love" (PH-1 featuring Baek Ye-rin)	2020	38	—N/a	Non album-singles
"KnoCK" (Code Kunst featuring Baek Ye-rin)	2020	—	—N/a	People
"Neo Seoul Love" (Loopy featuring Baek Ye-rin)	2020	—	—N/a	No Fear
"Gae Na Ri" (개나리) (Samuel Seo featuring Baek Ye-rin)	2020	—	—N/a	D I A L
"We Are All Muse" (The Blank Shop featuring Baek Ye-rin)	2020	—	—N/a	Tailor
"—" denotes a recording that did not chart or was not released in that territory

=== Soundtrack appearances ===
List of soundtrack singles, showing year released, selected chart positions, sales figures, and name of the album
Title	Year	Peak chart positions			Sales (DL)	Album
Title	Year	KOR	KOR Hot	US World	Sales (DL)	Album
"Blooming Memories" (아주 오래된 기억)	2017	93	—	—	KOR: 22,505	Chicago Typewriter OST
"Lean On Me" (스며들기 좋은 오늘)	2019	73	—	—	—N/a	A-Teen 2 OST
"Here I Am Again" (다시 난, 여기)	2020	4	6	21	—N/a	Crash Landing on You OST
"(They Long to Be) Close to You"	2025	—	—	—	—N/a	A Hundred Memories OST
"—" denotes a recording that did not chart or was not released in that territory

== Other charted songs ==
List of other charted songs, showing year released, selected chart positions, sales figures, and name of the album
Title	Year	Peak chart positions		Sales (DL)	Album
Title	Year	KOR	KOR Hot	Sales (DL)	Album
"As I Am"	2015	48	—N/a	KOR: 75,460	Frank
"Blue"	2015	49	—N/a	KOR: 70,212	Frank
"Don't Leave Me Alone" (혼자 두지 마)	2015	54	—N/a	KOR: 68,921	Frank
"Zz" (잠들고 싶어)	2015	61	—N/a	KOR: 56,488	Frank
"That's Why"	2015	67	—N/a	KOR: 50,315	Frank
"His Ocean" (그의 바다)	2016	25	—N/a	KOR: 142,107	Bye Bye My Blue
"Zero"	2016	35	—N/a	KOR: 79,130	Bye Bye My Blue
"Merry and the Witch's Flower" (야간비행 (魔女の花))	2019	10	14	—N/a	Our Love Is Great
"I Don't Know" (내가 날 모르는 것처럼) (featuring Car, the Garden)	2019	21	25	—N/a	Our Love Is Great
"See You Again" (지켜줄게)	2019	38	40	—N/a	Our Love Is Great
"Dear My Blue"	2019	42	44	—N/a	Our Love Is Great
"Our Love Is Great"	2019	46	48	—N/a	Our Love Is Great
"I Don't Know" (내가 날 모르는 것처럼) (2019 version)	2019	64	68	—N/a	Our Love Is Great
"Intro"	2019	158	—	—N/a	Every Letter I Sent You
"Rest"	2019	68	40	—N/a	Every Letter I Sent You
"Can I B U"	2019	94	69	—N/a	Every Letter I Sent You
"Meant to Be"	2019	90	64	—N/a	Every Letter I Sent You
"Mr.Gloomy"	2019	89	65	—N/a	Every Letter I Sent You
"Lovelovelove"	2019	85	60	—N/a	Every Letter I Sent You
"Bunny"	2019	78	52	—N/a	Every Letter I Sent You
"Berlin"	2019	126	75	—N/a	Every Letter I Sent You
"Datoom"	2019	101	71	—N/a	Every Letter I Sent You
"Not a Girl"	2019	110	74	—N/a	Every Letter I Sent You
"Newsong2"	2019	140	92	—N/a	Every Letter I Sent You
"Amy"	2019	147	—	—N/a	Every Letter I Sent You
"True Lover"	2019	131	82	—N/a	Every Letter I Sent You
"Point" (featuring Loopy)	2019	115	84	—N/a	Every Letter I Sent You
"London"	2019	104	73	—N/a	Every Letter I Sent You
"Lovegame"	2020	102	8	—N/a	Tellusboutyourself
"You're So Lonely Now, So You Need Me Back by Your Side Again"	2020	144	38	—N/a	Tellusboutyourself
"I Am Not Your Ocean Anymore"	2020	150	73	—N/a	Tellusboutyourself
"Hall&Oates"	2020	178	96	—N/a	Tellusboutyourself
"Ms. Delicate"	2020	189	100	—N/a	Tellusboutyourself
"Interlude"	2020	— (Note: "Interlude", "Loner", "Homesweethome", "Loveless", "I'll Be Your Family!", "I'm in Love" and "Bubbles&Mushrooms" did not enter the Gaon Digital chart top 200, but appeared at number 127, 113, 106, 98, 99, 107, 117 on the component Download chart, respectively.)	—	—N/a	Tellusboutyourself
"Loner"	2020	—	—	—N/a	Tellusboutyourself
"Homesweethome"	2020	—	—	—N/a	Tellusboutyourself
"Loveless"	2020	—	—	—N/a	Tellusboutyourself
"I'll Be Your Family!"	2020	—	—	—N/a	Tellusboutyourself
"I'm in Love"	2020	—	—	—N/a	Tellusboutyourself
"Bubbles&Mushrooms"	2020	—	—	—N/a	Tellusboutyourself
"Whenever" (그럴때마다)	2021	92	—	—N/a	Love, Yerin
"Antifreeze"	2021	73	—	—N/a	Love, Yerin
"Go Back" (돌아가자)	2021	123	—	—N/a	Love, Yerin
"Limit" (한계)	2021	98	—	—N/a	Love, Yerin
"It Was Me" (그게 나였네)	2022	149	—	—N/a	Pisces
"The Loved One" (막내)	2022	193	—	—N/a	Pisces
"—" denotes a recording that did not chart or was not released in that territory
