= The Volunteers (South Korean band) =

South Korean rock band

- Origin: South Korea
- Genre: Rock
- Years active: 2017–present
- Labels: Blue Vinyl (2021-2024); peoplelikepeople (2024-present)
- Members: Yerin Baek; Jonny; Chiheon
- Past members: Cloud

The Volunteers (Korean: 더 발룬티어스, abbreviated to TVT) is a South Korean rock band originally formed in 2017. Their first EP, Vanity&people, was independently released on September 15, 2018, through YouTube and SoundCloud. Prior their official debut, the group already amassed a fan base, with three million streams on SoundCloud and one million music video views on YouTube.

The band consists of three members: Yerin Baek (vocals, guitar), Jonny (leader, guitar), and Chiheon Kim (drums). Music producer and guitarist Cloud, who was a long-time collaborator of Baek on her solo activities left the band after the official termination of their contract and the closing of their agency Blue Vinyl. The band is currently under the agency peoplelikepeople.

According to Baek, the idea behind the name came from when the other members used to volunteer to help her create music and record without compensation, becoming "the people who volunteer to provide music that can do good for others.”

== History ==
=== 2017-2020: Formation ===
Members Jonny and Cloud debuted in 2011 as members of the South Korean indie band, Bye Bye Badman and Baek was introduced to Cloud and became long-time collaborators from the release of her first solo EP, Frank (2015), after she left the JYP duo, 15&. Drummer Chiheon got connected with the members through Cloud as a junior from his university.

The group was loosely formed at a drinking party on 2017, and though there was no plan to start anything, the members started making music around that time. According to Cloud, Baek's voice "sounded like rock material," and leader Jonny stated that the reason for not being able to debut sooner is due to the members being signed under different labels. Drummer Chiheon also mentioned that there were a lot of personal stuff going on and the members were all looking for the perfect timing.

The band cited influences such as Oasis, Red Hot Chili Peppers, Avril Lavigne, French pop band Tahiti 80, Japanese rock band Tokyo Jihen, British alternative rock band Wolf Alice, The Cranberries, and The Beatles.

On September 15, 2018, the band's Instagram account announced the release of their first independent EP, Vanity&people which contains five tracks, some of which were previously released on the band's SoundCloud account. On May 27, 2019, the band released their single "Radio".

=== 2021-2023: Blue Vinyl, The Volunteers, and solo concerts ===
On May 9, 2021, the band posted a recording behind-the-scenes video on their YouTube channel. A few days after, it was announced that the band officially joined Baek's independent label Blue Vinyl along with Baek herself and Cloud. On May 27, 2021, the group announced the release of their official commercial debut album, The Volunteers, consisting of new songs and previously released demos, marking the group's official debut.

On June 21, 2021, Blue Vinyl announced the band's first solo concert, Join the TVT Club, at the Hongdae Rolling Hall, with eight dates from July 15 to 25 of the following month, with all the dates sold out within 30 seconds. Following the tour, the band performed at the 17th Jecheon International Music & Film Festival, and the Incheon Pentaport Music Festival.

On June 22, 2022, a year after the announcement of the band's first solo concert, their second solo concert, This Is TVT Club was announced, with three dates from July 15 to 17 all immediately sold out. On July 7, 2022, the band revealed the artwork for their single, "New Plant", which was released on the 12th containing two tracks. Following the tour, the band performed at the Incheon Pentaport Music Festival, and Busan International Rock Festival.

=== 2024-present: Cloud's departure, "L", world tour, "Rules" ===
On March 3, 2024, following the end of the artists' contracts with the independent label Blue Vinyl, Cloud announced that he will officially withdraw from the band. The label also announced their closure the following month.

On June 10, 2024, the band announced their North American tour, confirming that the band will continue with three members. The tour kicked off in Seattle, and will end in Chicago. On June 14, 2024, the band announced the establishment of the new creative label, peoplelikepeople, with Baek acting as the creative director. The same day, the label's Instagram posted photos of the remaining members, signifying the band's new management, along the teaser photos for the band's second EP, "L", which was released on the 25th.

On July 1, 2024, the band announced their Asia Tour, spanning 10 cities across Asia.

On 14 February 2025, the group announced to their SNS accounts that they will be releasing a new single. On 25 February they released the single album "Rules" featuring the lead single of the same name, as well as another track titled "She's in someone's locket".

== Members ==
Current members

- Yerin Baek – vocals, keyboards, guitar
- Jonny (Kwak Min-hyeok) – leader, guitar, backing vocals
- Chiheon Kim (Kim Chi-heon) – drums, backing vocals

Former members

- Cloud (Ko Hyeong-seok) – bass, backing vocals

== Artistry ==
=== Musical Style and Influences ===
The Volunteers' music style is based primarily on the genre of rock music in the 1980s and 90s, especially alternative rock and grunge rock. Critics say that the band's music is characterized by the combination of Backing centered on bold power chords with melodies and vocals (beautiful harmony, delicate vibrato tones) unique to Yerin Baek. Some say that it reminds of The Cranberries or Sinéad O'Connor.

=== Sound and Instrumentation ===
In order to realize rock sound, the band mainly used Gibson Les Paul guitars and fuzz effectors instead of fender guitars. In addition, the drum sound tried to capture the natural sound as raw as possible.

=== Lyrical Themes ===
The lyrics contain emotions of 'rebel' or 'anger' toward society. In addition, songs such as 'Nicer' and 'S.A.D.' also express social anxiety and cynical attitudes.

== Reception ==
The band's debut studio album, The Volunteers, received positive reviews from music critics. It was nominated for Best Modern Rock Album at the 19th Korean Music Awards. Kwon Ik-do, a member of the Korean Music Awards selection committee, praised the album. He called the opening track "Violet" a "rock declaration" and described Yerin Baek's melodies and vocals as sparkling "like 'magic dust'" over the band's "solid, power-chord-centric backing."

== Discography ==
=== Studio albums ===
No.	Album Detail	Track Listing
1st	The Volunteers: Released: May 27, 2021; Label: Blue Vinyl	Track Listing: 1. Violet; 2. PINKTOP; 3. Let me go!; 4. Time to fight back in my way 5. Radio; 6. Crap; 7. Nicer; 8. Medicine; 9. S.A.D; 10. Summer
2nd	i love u: Released: September 14, 2026; Label: peoplelikepeople	1. That's my girl 2. White Truck; 3. happysad 4. Angels; 5. Broken Wedding; 6. Cool Kids Always Late; 7. Little Riot; 8. TIME (all yours..); 9. Our Life Is A Constant Western Film; 10. "RBF"; 11. i love u 12. Out-of-Body

=== EPs ===
No.	Album Detail	Track Listing
1st	Vanity&people: Released: September 15, 2018; Label: Independent	Track Listing: 1. Violet (remastered); 2. Nicer (remastered); 3. Crap (remastered); 4. S.A.D; 5. Summer
2nd	"L": Released: June 25, 2024; Label: peoplelikepeople	Track Listing: 1. Velvet Glove; 2. Psycho; 3. Tell 'em boys 4. Starfish on your head 5. L

=== Singles ===
Title	Year	Album
New Plant	2023	"New Plant"
Hypocreep	2023	"New Plant"

Title	Year	Album
Rules	2025	"Rules"
She's in someone's locket	2025	"Rules"

=== Music videos ===
Title	Year	Director(s)	Ref.
"Violet"	2021	Unknown	
"Let me go!"	2021	Unknown	
"L"	2024	Hyeongjun Park	
"Rules"	2025	Unknown	
"RBF"	2026	Taejong Song	

== Concerts and tours ==
=== Headlining ===
==== Concerts ====
- Welcome to TVT Club (2021)
- This Is TVT Club (2023)

==== World tours ====
- 2024 The Volunteers North American Tour
- 2024 The Volunteers Asia Tour

== Awards and nominations ==
Year	Award	Category	Nominated work	Result	Ref.
2022	19th Korean Music Awards	Best Modern Rock Album	The Volunteers	Nominated	
