= 2020 Melon Music Awards =

Korean music award ceremony, 2020

- Date: December 2–5, 2020
- Location: South Korea

Highlights
- Most awards: BTS (6)
- Most nominations: BTS (8)
- Artist of the Year Award: BTS
- Album of the Year Award: Map of the Soul: 7
- Song of the Year Award: "Dynamite"
- Website: www.melon.com/mma/index.htm

Television/radio coverage
- Network: 1theK; Daum; Melon; YouTube; KakaoTV

The 2020 Melon Music Awards ceremony, organized by Kakao M through its online music store, Melon, took place virtually from December 2 through December 5, 2020 (dubbed as "MMA Week") in South Korea, with the main ceremony taking place on December 5 at 19:00 KST. This is the twelfth ceremony in the show's history, and the first to be held online and over a span of four days. It was held without an audience due to the COVID-19 pandemic.

BTS won 6 awards during the ceremony, sweeping all three Grand Awards (Daesangs) including Artist of the Year for the second consecutive year.

== Judging criteria ==
Division	Online Voting	Digital Sales	Judge Score
Top 10 Artists	20%	80%	—
Main awards*	20%	60%	20%
Genre Awards**	20%	50%	30%
Popularity Awards***	60%	40%	—
Special Awards****	—	—	100%
*Artist of the Year, Album of the Year, Song of the Year, Best New Artist; **Rap/Hip Hop, R&B/Ballad, Rock, OST, Trot, Pop, Dance, Folk/Blue, Indie, Electronic, Hot Trend Award; ***Netizen Popularity Award, KaKao Hot Star Award; ****Record of the Year, Stage of the Year, Music Video Award, Song Writer Award, 1theK Performance Award

== Winners and nominees ==
Voting for Melon's Top 10 Artists category opened on the Melon Music website on November 11 and continued until November 20. Only artists who released music between November 30, 2019, and November 10, 2020, are eligible. The longlist of nominees was selected based on a chart performance score (60% downloads and 40% streams) for each artist combined with weekly Melon Popularity Award votes achieved during the eligibility period. Voting for Category awards, including daesang and rookie awards, took place from November 21 to 26, 2020.

Winners are listed first and highlighted in bold.

Top 10 Artists (Bonsang)	Song of the Year (Daesang)
**Kim Ho-joong**; **BTS**; **Baek Ye-rin**; **Baekhyun**; **IU**; **Oh My Girl**; **Lim Young-woong**; **Zico**; **Blackpink**; **Iz*One**	**BTS – "Dynamite"**; Blackpink – "How You Like That"; Yerin Baek – Square (2017); IU – "Eight" featuring Suga; Zico – "Any Song"; Red Velvet – "Psycho"; Hwasa – Maria; MC the Max – Bloom; Oh My Girl – Nonstop; SSAK3 – Beach Again
Artist of the Year (Daesang)	Album of the Year (Daesang)
**BTS**; Baek Ye-rin; IU; Lim Young-woong; Zico; Blackpink; Baekhyun; Iz*One; Kim Ho-joong; Oh My Girl	**BTS – Map of the Soul: 7**; Iz*One – Bloom*Iz; Baek Ye-rin – Every letter I sent you; Oh My Girl – Nonstop; Blackpink – The Album; Baekhyun – Delight; Bol4 – Youth Diary II; Hwasa – María (EP); NCT 127 – Neo Zone; Red Velvet – The ReVe Festival: Finale
Best New Artist	Netizen Popularity Award
**Cravity**; **Weeekly**; Treasure; Cignature; MCND	**BTS**; Iz*One; Baekhyun; Blackpink; Apink; IU; Oh My Girl; Suho; SSAK3; Lim Young-woong
Best Dance Award (Male)	Best Dance Award (Female)
**BTS – "Dynamite**"; Seventeen – "Left & Right"; NCT Dream – "Ridin'"; SF9 – "Good Guy"; J. Y. Park featuring Sunmi – "When We Disco"	**Blackpink – "How You Like That"**; Oh My Girl – "Nonstop"; Hwasa – "Maria"; Iz*One – "Fiesta"; Red Velvet – "Psycho"
Best R&B/Soul Award	Best Rap/Hip Hop Award
**Baek Ye-rin – "Square (2017)"**; Baekhyun – "Candy"; Lee Hi – "Holo"; Taeyeon – "Happy"; Paul Kim – "But I'll Miss You"	**Yumdda, The Quiett, Deepflow, Paloalto & Simon Dominic – "I'mma Do"**; BTS – "On"; Jessi – "Nunu Nana"; Zico – "Any Song"; Rain, Jay Park, Haon, Sik-K, PH-1 – "Gang (Remix)"
Best OST Award	Best Rock Award
**Jo Jung-suk – "Aloha"**; Gaho – "Start Over"; Kim Feel – "Someday, the Boy"; IU – "Give You My Heart"; Jeon Mi-do – "I Knew I Love"	**IU – "Eight" featuring Suga**; Suho – "Let's Love"; N.Flying – "Oh Really"; Day6 – "Zombie"; Younha – "Dark Cloud"
Best Pop Award	Best Ballad Award
**Sam Smith – "To Die For"**; Ariana Grande and Justin Bieber – "Stuck With U"; Harry Styles – "Watermelon Sugar"; Jawsh 685, Jason Derulo, BTS – "Savage Love (Laxed – Siren Beat) (BTS Remix)"; Anne-Marie – "Birthday"	**Davichi – "Dear."**; IU and Sung Si Kyung – "First Winter"; Jung Seung-hwan – "My Christmas Wish"; MC the Max – "Bloom"; Baek Ji-young – "No Love, No Heartbreak"
Best Indie Award	Best Trot Award
**Bolbbalgan4 – Leo (featuring Baekhyun)**	**Lim Young-woong – "Trust in Me"**; Kim Ho-joong – "I Love You More Than Me"; Second Aunt Kim Da-vi – "Gimme Gimme"; Young Tak – "Jjin-iya"; Jung Dong-won – "Blank Spaces"
Hot Trend Award
**Trot Men 6**; SSAK3; Jo Jung-suk; Zico; Sik-K, PH-1, Jay Park, Haon

=== Other awards ===
Award	Winner(s)
**Best Songwriter Award**	Young Tak
**1theK Original Content**	The Boyz
**Best Performance Director**	Son Sung-deuk
**Best Performance**	Monsta X
**Best Session Instrumental**	Drums – Shin Seok-cheol; Sound Designer – Hong Soo-jin; Bassist – Choi-hoon; Cross – Kim Hyun-ah; Guitarist – Jukjae

== Performers ==
List of performances at 2020 Melon Music Awards
Artist(s)	Song(s)	Notes / Segment
Day 1
Yumdda, The Quiett, Deepflow, Paloalto, Simon Dominic	"I'mma Do"	Best Rap & Hip Hop awardee
Day6	"Landed" / "Where the Sea Sleeps" / "Thanks To"	Tiny Room Live
Park Moon-chi	"We're Cool" (with Park Moon-chi Universe) / "I'm Into You" (with Kirin, Dala, & Jungu)	Park Moon Chi & Friends' City Music Tour
Day 2
Gaho	"Start Over" (Itaewon Class OST)	"OST Medley"
Gaho	"Give You My Heart" (orig. by IU) (Crash Landing on You OST)	"OST Medley"
Gaho	"Aloha" (orig. by Cool & Jo Jung-suk) (Hospital Playlist OST)	"OST Medley"
Gaho	"My Love" (orig. by Baekhyun) (Dr. Romantic 2 OST)	"OST Medley"
Gaho	"Running" (Start-Up OST)	"OST Medley"
Leenalchi	Intro / "You Know Who I Am?" / "Tiger Is Coming"	Leenalchi Bespoke Story
Day 3
Jeong Se-woon	"Twenty-Something"	Performance during "The-Play" segment
Crying Nut	"Isn't That Good"	Performance during "The-Play" segment
Weeekly	"Zig Zag" / "Tag Me"	Rookie Stage
Cravity	"Break All the Rules"	Rookie Stage
Jang Beom-june	"Your Shampoo Scent In The Flowers" / "Can't Sleep" / "Karaoke"	Tiny Room Live
Day 4
Choi Jung-hoon (Jannabi), Simon Dominic, Code Kunst	"For the Gone" (with Elle Korea)	Reconnect
Iz*One	Intro / "Fiesta" / "Secret Story of the Swan"	Bloomy
TXT	Intro / "Puma" / "Blue Hour" / Outro	The Moment When Time Becomes Space
Young Tak	"Why Are You Coming Out From There?" / "Jjin-iya"	Come On! My life
The Boyz	Intro / "The Stealer"	Dark Before the Dawn
YooA (Oh My Girl)	"Far" / "Bon Voyage"	Oh My Utopia
Oh My Girl	"Dolphin" (acoustic ver.) / "Nonstop"	Oh My Utopia
Monsta X	Intro / "Beastmode" / Love Killa"	Love's Madness
Lim Young-woong	"Trust In Me" / "Hero"	Hero: The Origin Of Love
BTS	"Black Swan" / "On" / "Life Goes On" / "Dynamite"	"Be" There

== Presenters ==
Day 1

- Jae Jae, Wyatt (ONF), Lee Dae-hwi (AB6IX), Lee Jang-jun (Golden Child) – opening segment
- Davichi – Best Ballad Award & brief Q&A segment

Day 2

- Jae Jae, Wyatt, Lee Dae-hwi, Lee Jang-jun – opening segment
- Jo Jung-suk – Best OST & brief Q&A segment

Day 3

- Jeong Se-woon, Dr. Seo Chang-hun, Weeekly, Crying Nut – "The-Play" segment
- Shin Seok-cheol, Hong Soo-jin, Choi-hoon, Kim Hyun-ah, Juckjae – presented Best Session Instrumental Award & brief Q&A segment

Day 4

- Jeff Benjamin, David Amber, Mayu Wakisaka, Danny Lee, Andreas Oberg – opening Q&A segment
- Bae Suzy – narrator for intro and outro
- Yoo Yeon-seok – opening introduction
- Yoo Jae-suk – presented Album of the Year
- Kim Jun-soo – presented Best Dance Awards
- Ock Joo-hyun – presented Song of the Year
- Yoo Hee-yeol – presented Artist of the Year
