= K-pop Star 5 =

- Season 5
- Hosted by: Jun Hyun-moo; Boom
- Judges: Park Jin-young; Yang Hyun-suk; You Hee-yeol
- Winner: Lee Soo-jung
- Runner-up: Ahn Ye-eun

Release
- Original network: SBS
- Original release: November 22, 2015 – April 10, 2016

Season chronology
- ← Previous; K-pop Star 4 Next → K-pop Star 6: The Last Chance

The fifth season of the South Korean reality television competition show K-pop Star premiered on SBS on November 22, 2015, airing Sunday evenings at 6:10 pm KST as part of the Good Sunday lineup. Yang Hyun-suk, Park Jin-young, and You Hee-yeol returned as judges. The contest began receiving applications in May, with preliminary auditions taking place in Seoul and throughout South Korea, as well as the United States, Europe, Asia, and Australia until September 2014. The season ended on April 10, 2016, with Lee Soo-jung crowned as winner and choosing to sign with Antenna Music.

== Process ==
- Audition applications + Preliminary auditions (May – September 2015)
  - Preliminary auditions were held in Seoul, Busan and Gwangju, with global auditions being held in New York, Los Angeles, Chicago, Toronto, Atlanta and Vancouver.
- Round 1: Talent Audition (Airdate: November 22 – December 6, 2015)
  - Contestants who passed the preliminary auditions appear in front of the three judges for the first time. Contestants can pass with at least two "passes" from the judges, or a judge can offer to use the Wild Card.
- Round 2: Ranking Audition (Airdate: December 6 – 27, 2015)
  - Contestants who pass the first round are put into groups with others that are most similar to their singing style. The whole group can pass, fail, or a selected few can pass. Each contestant gets to have one-on-one training with Park Jin-young, Yang Hyun-suk, or You Hee-yeol.
- Round 3: Team Mission (Airdate: December 27, 2015 – January 17, 2016)
  - Contestants form teams to compete against another team. The winning team moves on to the next round. At least one member of the losing team must be eliminated.
- Round 4: Casting Audition (Airdate: January 24 – 31, 2016)
  - Contestants perform solo or in teams assigned by the judges. Each judge has six casting cards. Each spot can be occupied by a contestant or a team of contestants. Contestants selected train with their particular judge for the battle audition. Contestants not selected in the casting round are eliminated.
- Round 5: Battle Audition (Airdate: February 7 – 21, 2016)
  - Contestants represent the company they were cast to in a 1 to 1 to 1 battle. First place automatically gets to be in the Top 10, while 3rd place is eliminated. Contestants who finish in 2nd place battle the other contestants who finished 2nd place. Anyone who does not get in the Top 10 teams/contestants is eliminated.
- Round 6: Stage Audition (Airdate: February 28 – April 10, 2016)

== Judges ==
- Yang Hyun-suk: YG Entertainment founder, producer, dancer
- Park Jin-young: JYP Entertainment founder, producer, singer, songwriter
- You Hee-yeol: Antenna Music founder, songwriter, composer, pianist

== Top 10 ==
- 이수정 (Lee Soo-jung) – 23 (1993) (United States), Winner, signed under Antenna Music
- 안예은 (Ahn Ye-eun) – 24 (1992) (Korea), Runner-up, signed under Pandawhale
- 이시은 (Lee Si-eun) – 21 (1995) (Korea), eliminated on April 3, 2016 (4th Live), signed under HF Music Company
- 마진가S (Mazinga S):, eliminated on April 3, 2016 (3rd Live)
  - 조이스 리 (Joyce Lee) – 18 (1998) (United States),
  - 김예림 (Kim Ye-rim) – 22 (1994) (Korea),
  - 려위위 (Liu Yuyu)- 18 (1998) (China),
  - 데니스 김 (Denise Kim) – 15 (2001) (United States), trained under YG Entertainment, debuted in Secret Number under Vine Entertainment
- 유제이 (Jei Yu) – 16 (2000) (United States), eliminated on March 27, 2016 (3rd Live), signed under WorldStar Entertainment
- 우예린 (Woo Ye-rin) – 21 (1995) (Korea), eliminated on March 27, 2016 (3rd Live), signed under PurplePine Entertainment
- 정진우 (Jung Jin-woo) – 19 (1997) (Korea), eliminated on March 22, 2016 (2nd Live), signed under Planetarium Records
- 박민지 (Park Min-ji) – 18 (1998) (Korea), eliminated on March 22, 2016 (2nd Live)
- 소피 한 (Sophie Han) – 15 (2001) (United States), eliminated on March 6, 2016 (1st Live)
- 주미연 (Joo Mi-yeon) – 25 (1991) (Korea), eliminated on March 6, 2016 (1st Live)

== Round 6: Stage Auditions ==
- For the Top 8 Finals, the Top 10 competed in two groups on stage with the results determined by the judges. The top three contestants from each group were chosen to proceed to the next round.
  - The Top 8, who proceeded to the live stage, were determined by the three judges as well as a 100-member Audience Judging Panel. The last two contestants from each group became Elimination Candidates, with the Audience Judging Panel voting for their preferred act. The two acts with the most votes from the four Elimination Candidates proceeded to the Top 8, with the other two contestants eliminated.

Episode #	Group	Order	Name	Song – Original Artist	Rank	Result
Top 8 Finals (Feb 28 & March 6)
15	B	1	Lee Si-eun	빨래 – 이적 (Lee Juck)	Elimination Candidate	Top 8
15	B	2	Ju Mi-yeon	아니 – 거미 (Gummy)	Elimination Candidate	Eliminated
15	B	3	Ahn Ye-eun	미스터 미스터리 (Mister Mystery) – 자작곡 (Self-Written Song)	1st	Top 8
15	B	4	Mazinger S	HER – (Block B)	3rd	Top 8
15	B	5	Park Min-ji	우주를 건너 – 박예린 (Baek Ye-rin)	2nd	Top 8
16	A	1	Woo Ye-rin	우울한 편지 – 유재하 (Yoo Jae Ha)	1st	Top 8
16	A	2	Lee Soo-jung	시간이 흐른뒤 (After Time Passes) – 윤미래 (Yoon Mi-rae)	2nd	Top 8
16	A	3	Jung Jin-woo	너에게 – 서태지와 아이들 (Seo Taiji and Boys)	3rd	Top 8
16	A	4	Sophie Han	미쳤어 (Crazy) – 손담비 (Son Dam-bi)	Elimination Candidate	Eliminated
16	A	5	Jei Yu	고해 – 임재범 (Yim Jae-beom)	Elimination Candidate	Top 8

- The Top 8 competes 1:1 on the live stage with the results determined by the judges. One contestant from each group is chosen to proceed to the next round.
- The contestants not chosen will go through voting by 100 citizen judges, where the two top contestants will proceed to the next round.

Episode #	Group	Order	Name	Song – Original Artist	Judge's Decision			2nd Chance	Result
Episode #	Group	Order	Name	Song – Original Artist	JYP	YG	Antenna	2nd Chance	Result
Top 6 Finals (March 13 & March 20)
17 & 18	1	1	Lee Soo-jung	Twenty Three (스물셋) – IU (아이유)	Mazinger S	Mazinger S	Mazinger S	2nd	Top 6
17 & 18	1	2	Mazinger S	그녀는 예뻤다 – Park Jin-young (박진영)	Mazinger S	Mazinger S	Mazinger S	N/A	Top 6
17 & 18	2	3	Lee Si-eun	이 밤이 지나면 – Yim Jae-beom (임재범)	Ahn Ye-eun	Lee Si-eun	Ahn Ye-eun	1st	Top 6
17 & 18	2	4	Ahn Ye-eun	하얀 원피스 (White Dress) – 자작곡 (Self-written song)	Ahn Ye-eun	Lee Si-eun	Ahn Ye-eun	N/A	Top 6
17 & 18	3	5	Woo Ye-rin	허쉬 (Hush) – Miss A (미쓰에이)	Woo Ye-rin	Woo Ye-rin	Woo Ye-rin	N/A	Top 6
17 & 18	3	6	Jung Jin-woo	동화책 없어 (No Fairy Tales) – 자작곡 (Self-written song)	Woo Ye-rin	Woo Ye-rin	Woo Ye-rin	–	Eliminated
17 & 18	4	7	Jei Yu	"I Want To Fall in Love (사랑에 빠지고 싶다) – Kim Jo-han (김조한)	Jei Yu	Jei Yu	Park Min-ji	N/A	Top 6
17 & 18	4	8	Park Min-ji	Rough (시간을 달려서) – GFriend (여자친구)	Jei Yu	Jei Yu	Park Min-ji	–	Eliminated

- For the Top 4, 3 Finals, Semi-finals and Finals, the judges and viewers' scores were weighted 60:40, and were combined to eliminate the contestant with the lowest score.

Episode #	Order	Name	Song – Original Artist	Judges Score			Result
Episode #	Order	Name	Song – Original Artist	JYP	YG	Antenna	Result
Top 4 Finals (March 27)
19	1	Woo Ye-rin	잠 못 드는 밤 비는 내리고 – Kim Gun-mo (김건모)	85	90	91	Eliminated
19	2	Lee Si-eun	한숨 (Breathe)- Lee Hi (이하이)	87	95	96	Top 4
19	3	Jei Yu	Hit the Road Jack – Ray Charles	86	85	90	Eliminated
19	4	Mazinger S	둘이서 (Two of Us) – 채연 Chae Yeon	97	95	94	Top 4
19	5	Lee Soo-jung	소녀 (A Little Girl) – Lee Moon-se (이문세)	100	97	95	Top 4
19	6	Ahn Ye-eun	If Spring Comes (봄이 온다면) – 자작곡 (Self Written Song)	98	95	93	Top 4
Top 2 Finals (April 3)
20	1	Lee Si-eun	취중진담 – 김동률	87	92	90	Eliminated
20	2	Lee Soo-jung	니가 사는 그집 (Your House) – Park Jin-young (박진영)	95	94	94	Top 2
20	3	Ahn Ye-eun	호구 – 자작곡 (Self Written Song)	88	95	95	Top 2
20	4	Mazinger S	Hero – Mariah Carey	90	94	89	Eliminated
Finals (April 10)
21	Round 1: Choice						
21	1	Ahn Ye-eun	Just say it- 자작곡 (Self Written Song)	92	95	97	–
21	2	Lee Soo-jung	편지 (The Letter) – Kim Kwang-jin (김광진)	92	92	93	–
21	Round 2: Song Previously Sung by opponent						
21	1	Ahn Ye-eun	Part-Time Lover – Stevie Wonder	98	100	98	Runner-up
21	2	Lee Soo-jung	Stick-er – (자작곡) Ahn Ye Eun	100	100	100	Winner

== Ratings ==
In the individual show ratings below, the highest rating is in red, with the lowest in blue. (Note: Individual show ratings do not include commercial time, which regular ratings include.)

Episode #	Original Airdate	TNmS Ratings	AGB Ratings
Episode #	Original Airdate	Nationwide	
1	November 22, 2015	10.1%	11.5%
2	November 29, 2015	9.3%	12.0%
3	December 6, 2015	9.3%	12.6%
4	December 13, 2015	9.3%	11.4%
5	December 20, 2015	10.0%	12.7%
6	December 27, 2015	9.6%	12.4%
7	January 3, 2016	9.6%	13.3%
8	January 10, 2016	9.9%	12.4%
9	January 17, 2016	10.6%	12.4%
10	January 24, 2016	11.2%	13.1%
11	January 31, 2016	11.8%	12.5%
12	February 7, 2016	9.6%	11.2%
13	February 14, 2016	11.5%	14.4%
14	February 21, 2016	9.5%	10.8%
15	February 28, 2016	–	11.7%
16	March 6, 2016	–	12.3%
17	March 13, 2016	–	13.1%
18	March 20, 2016	–	11.3%
19	March 27, 2016	–	12.2%
