= Yun Seok-cheol =

South Korean jazz pianist (born 1985)

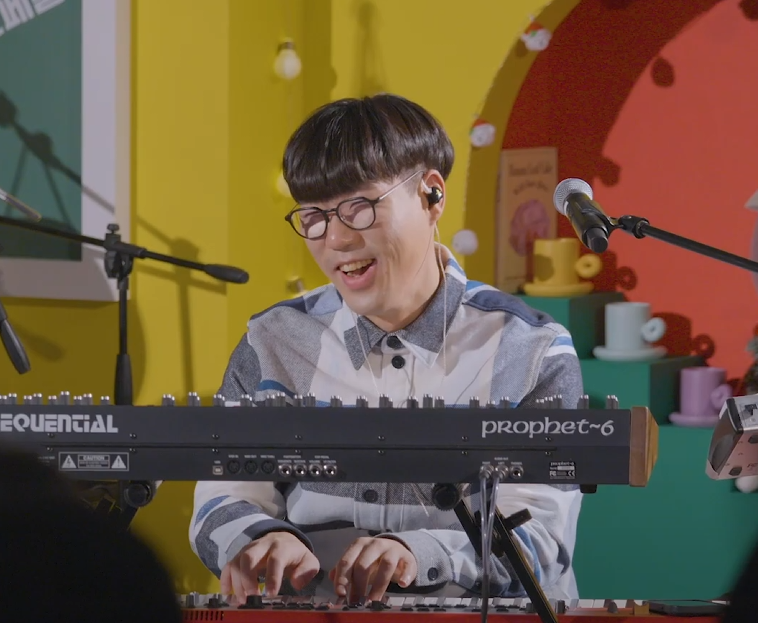
- Yun Seok-cheol during a small scale fan invitation concert in 2023

Background information
- Also known as: The Blank Shop
- Born: April 10, 1985 (age 41)
- Genres: Jazz; Korean indie
- Occupations: Jazz pianist; composer; record producer
- Instruments: Piano; keyboards; vocals
- Years active: 2004–present
- Labels: Private Curve Entertainment; Antenna (2019 - present)
- Website: http://blog.naver.com/scjazzy

Yun Seok-cheol (Korean: 윤석철; born April 10, 1985) is a South Korean jazz pianist, composer and record producer. Coming to prominence in the Korean jazz scene as part of the Yun Seok Cheol Trio, he is also a member of the band Temperature of Saying Hi, as well as a producer under the name The Blank Shop. He has appeared in various radio and television programs in South Korea including You Hee-yeol's Sketchbook, Sunny's FM Date, and The EBS space.

== Biography ==
Yun Seok-cheol was born in Seoul, South Korea. He attended Daejin High School and majored in jazz at JEI University. He began playing in local jazz clubs at the age of 20, hosting a jam night at Club Evans in Hongdae, Seoul for more than seven years. He won first place at the Ulsan Jazz Festival in 2005 and won third place at the Jarasum International Jazz Festival competition in 2008.

Along with bassist Kim Sang-yee and drummer Kim Yong-jin, he is a member of the Yun Seok Cheol Trio, which was formed with the desire to "create a jazz group that felt like a rock or indie band". They released their first album, Growth, in 2009 and released their second album Love is a Song in 2013. In 2018, they released the D Flat in April, an EP containing new tracks as well remakes of old songs.

Yun is active in the K-pop scene as a producer and session musician, working with singers such as Zion.T, Beenzino, Jang Hye-jin, Sam Kim, Kwon Jin-ah and Baek Yerin. His best known composition is arguably "Just" by Crush and Zion.T, which debuted atop the Gaon Digital Chart in 2015 with an eventual chart run of 35 weeks. His production work fuses elements of jazz, hip-hop and electronic music.

He joined You Hee-yeol's music label Antenna in March 2019. On September 17, 2020, he released Tailor, his first album under the producer alias The Blank Shop. It featured guest appearances from Sunwoojunga, 10cm, Ha Heon-jin, Wonpil, Yerin Baek, Cadejo, Lee Jin-ah, and Hello Ga-Young.

Yun was previously a lecturer in the Practical Music Department at Dongduk Women's University and the Jazz Music Department at JEI University. He currently lectures at Kukje University of Arts.

In 2024, Yun joined V of BTS and Park Hyo-shin for an alternate version of the song, "Winter Ahead".

On February 6, 2025, Yun Seok-cheol Trio (namely Yoon Seok-cheol, Jeong Sang-i, and Kim Young-jin) has been nominated for the "22nd Korean Music Awards" under the category 'Best Jazz - Instrumental Album' category. Yun together with the Yun Seok-cheol Trio, will be having a club tour starting called '2025 Yoon Seok-cheol Trio Club Tour' in four regions od South Korea starting with Daegu on February 15, Jeonju on the 16th, Wonju on the 21st and daejeon on the 23rd.

== Discography ==
=== As a solo artist ===
| Title | Album information | Track listing |
|---|---|---|
| Hello Again | Released: April 15, 2010; Label: Mirrorball Jazz World; Format: CD, digital download | Track listing: 1. Say Hello Again; 2. Unforgettable; 3. Self-Portrait; 4. Playground Of Stars; 5. Kids Play In Jazz; 6. Lovers; 7. Music Box; 8. My Brother; 9. I Am Not Full; 10. The Drunken Cat; 11. The 19th Of March; 12. I Forgot You; 13. Leave Me Alone; 14. In A Depressed Mood; 15. I Walk This Way; 16. I Don't Know The End; 17. Adlib (Bonus Track) |
| Alice Into the Rabbit Hole | Released: March 14, 2018; Label: Private Curve; Format: Digital download | Track listing: 1. Curiouser and Curiouser; 2. Into the Rabbit Hole; 3. Central Square; 4. Mirror Room; 5. Who R U 6. Good Advice; 7. A Very Merry Unbirthday; 8. Goodbye, Dinah! |
| Sugar Planet | Released: September 6, 2018; Label: Private Curve; Format: Digital download | Track listing: 1. Cook Everything; 2. Pink Cloud; 3. Candy and Rhodes; 4. Deep Blue Piano; 5. Choco Pool; 6. Funky Lemon Juice; 7. My Heart! My Heart!; 8. Walking With the Wind; 9. We Are Sweet; 10. We're Going to Sweet Planet |

=== As The Blank Shop ===
| Title | Album information | Track listing |
|---|---|---|
| Tailor | Released: September 17, 2020; Label: Antenna; Format: CD, digital download, vinyl | Track listing: 1. AmoneThat'sCapone (feat. Sunwoojunga); 2. No Place to Retreat (feat. 10cm); 3. How Can I Live Without Love (feat. Ha Heonjin); 4. Lazy Mornings; 5. Love Song (feat. Wonpil); 6. We Are All Muse (feat. Yerin Baek); 7. Stay at Home; 8. Kick the Radio (feat. Cadejo); 9. Ensemble; 10. LAN Escape (feat. Lee Jin-ah; 11. Mold in Closet; 12. Yawning Song; 13. 500,000; 14. What I Can't Do (feat. Hello Ga-Young) |

=== With Yun Seok Cheol Trio ===
| Title | Album information | Track listing |
|---|---|---|
| Growth | Released: December 2009; Label: Universal Music; Format: CD, digital download | Track listing: 1. Attack Key; 2. Gony; 3. 2004 Seoul; 4. Can You Feel My Love; 5. Vacant Mind; 6. Growth; 7. Pine Away Intro; 8. Pine Away; 9. Peri's Scope; 10. Not Yet; 11. 안녕히 주무세요 |
| Love is a Song | Released: February 6, 2013; Label: Evans Music; Format: CD, digital download | Track listing: 1. No Matter; 2. We Don't Need to Go There; 3. Show Must Go On; 4. Three Points of View; 5. Stubborn (막무가내); 6. Boost Drinking, Simple Music (음주권장경음악); 7. Trampoline; 8. Good Night (안녕히 주무세요); 9. Love is a Song; 10. Muse |
| Merrily Music (즐겁게, 음악.) | Released: November 17, 2014; Label: Evans Music; Format: CD, digital download | Track listing: 1. Man Living Near the Women's University (여대 앞에 사는 남자); 2. Someday My Fxxxxx Will Come; 3. Class in Session (렛슨 중); 4. Merrily Music (즐겁게, 음악.); 5. Renoir; 6. Gentle Wind |
| Jayu Rhythm (자유리듬) | Released: May 19, 2016; Label: Private Curve; Format: CD, digital download | Track listing: 1. Fake Monologue (독백이라 착각하기 쉽다); 2. Fatigue in the Springtime (춘곤); 3. Lesson 2 (렛슨중2) (Feat. Kim Kan-ji); 4. Giant Steps; 5. Free Rhythm (자유리듬); 6. Gogh (고흐) |
| Songbook | Released: December 11, 2019; Label: Antenna; Format: CD, digital download | Track listing: 1. His Gait is Strange; 2. Do Not Speed! (feat. Antonio Zanetti); 3. Breath; 4. Conversation Between Two; 5. 2019 Seoul; 6. Not Yet; 7. Man Living Near the Women's University; 8. Merrily, Music; 9. Love is a Song |
| Familiar and Constant (익숙하고 일정한) | Released: February 21, 2022; Label: Antenna; Format: Digital download, streaming | Track listing: 1. Korean Fairy Tale; 2. Love Song; 3. How Could You; 4. Familiar and Constant; 5. Dosanim Funk |

=== With Temperature of Saying Hi ===
| Title | Album information | Track listing |
|---|---|---|
| The Individual Memory of Love (사랑에 관한 각자의 기억) | Released: February 1, 2017; Label: Top2; Format: CD, digital download | Track listing: 1. Forever Winter (feat. Grace); 2. In the Middle of Love (feat. Sunwoojunga); 3. Cruel (feat. Yun Seok-cheol); 4. What Am I Gonna Do? (feat. Jiun); 5. The Night to Live for Winter (feat. NoticeNote); 6. One Side Love (feat. Grace); 7. Swamp (feat. Joonha Park); 8. The Day We Said Goodbye (feat. Hello Ga-Young); 9. Star (Bye Flower) (feat. Moha); 10. Now (feat. Lee So Wall); 11. The Individual Memory of Love (feat. Sang E Jung) |
| Feel It (느껴봐) | Released: November 28, 2019; Label: Top2; Format: Digital download | Track listing: 1. Feel It; 2. Days Like These; 3. Rainbow; 4. If You Tell Me; 5. My Heart is an Ocean; 6. I'm Okay With Being Alone (feat. Samjumoh) |

== Awards, nominations and invitations ==
- 6th Ulsan Jazz Festival in 2005 – First place
- 2nd Jarasum International Jazz Festival Competition in 2008 - Third place
- Nominated a 2009 'Rising Star' by Korean jazz magazine Jazz People
- Invited to Japan Takatsuki Jazz Festival
- Invited to Taichung Jazz Festival
- Nominated for Best Jazz Album at 2017 Korean Music Awards for Jayu Rhythm
- Nominated for Best Pop Album at 2021 Korean Music Awards for Tailor
- Nominated for Best Jazz Instrumental Album at 2025 Korean Music Awards for My Summer's Not Over Yet

== Filmography ==
=== Web shows ===
| Year | Title | Network | Role | Notes | Ref. |
|---|---|---|---|---|---|
| 2021 | Clumsy Antenna | Kakao TV | Main Cast | with Artist from Antenna | |
