= Ahn Ye-eun =

South Korean singer (born 1992)

Ahn Ye-eun 안예은
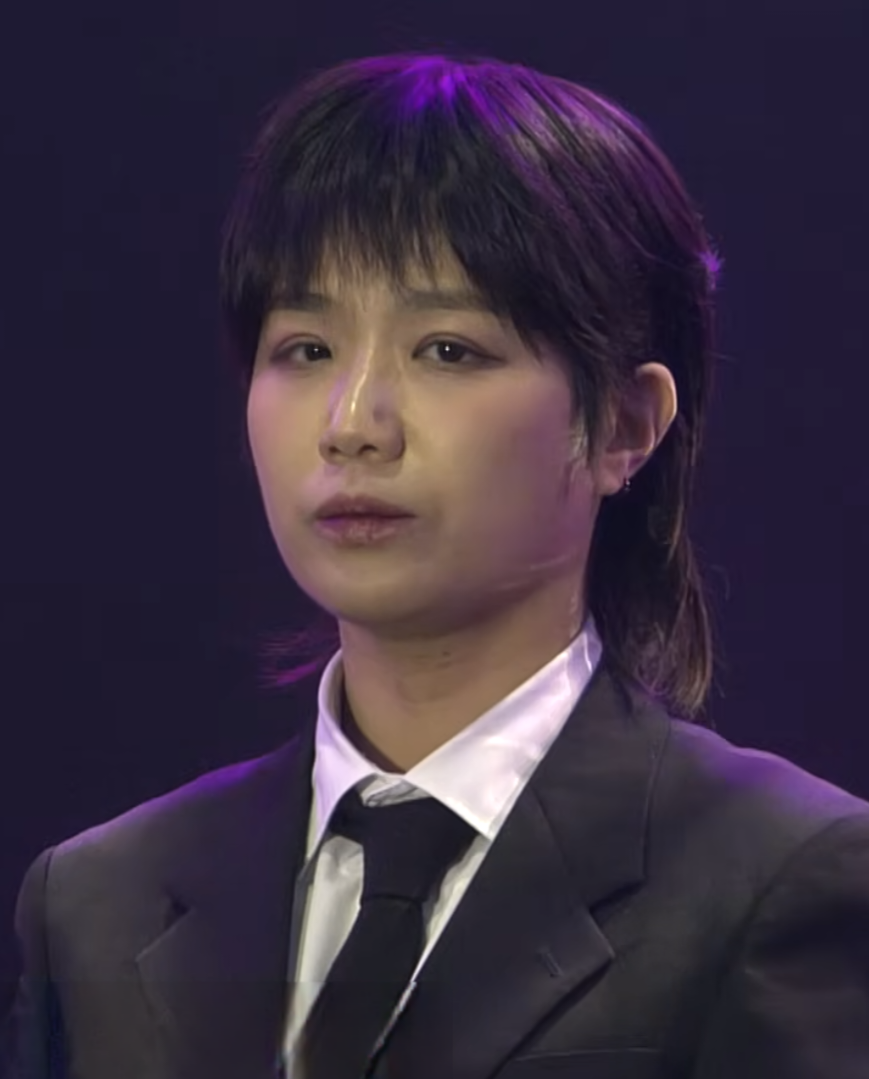
- Ahn in 2026

Background information
- Born: May 21, 1992 (age 34); Garak-dong, Songpa District, Seoul, South Korea
- Genres: Pop rock; Folk rock; R&B; Blues; Ballad
- Occupations: Singer; songwriter
- Instruments: Vocals; keyboard
- Years active: 2016–present

Korean name
- Hangul: 안예은
- Hanja: 安叡垠
- RR: An Yeeun
- MR: An Yeŭn

Ahn Ye-eun (Korean: 안예은; born May 21, 1992), is a South Korean genre-bending singer-songwriter, who is best known as the runner-up of K-pop Star 5. She is well known for singing the soundtrack for the TV series The Rebel.

== Early life and education ==
Ahn was born with congenital heart defect, and she said she had spent almost her entire childhood in hospitals. She started learning piano at the age of four. Influenced by Kim Yoon-ah, the lead singer in Jaurim, and female-fronted bands such as Loveholics and Cherry Filter, Ahn had wished to become a singer since middle school. She was attending the Applied Music department of Dong-ah Institute of Media and Arts. In 2019, a social media post accused Ahn of past school violence, but she and her agency since refuted the legitimacy of this accusation.

== Artistry ==
"Changgwi"
Sample from "Changgwi", based on the ghostlore of the same name. The Harvard Crimson described the story and style of the single as "ambiguous", means the song bobs and weaves between genres, cultures and time periods.

Ahn's musical style mixed traditional folk and pop. Her mostly musical style is pansori, a traditional Korean narrative singing. Ahn's discography saw more modern and new pansori that kept the base elements of pansori while adding a different touch such as the inclusion of more instruments. The switch between similar-sounding instruments of different cultures appears in her songs.

Ahn's music has various motifs, most from Korean folktales and historical events, while others from the Proust phenomenon, Korean shamanism, etc. Her debut album Ahn Ye-eun was about love. She released four horror songs since 2020, which started out "curiosity about whether music alone can make people feel scared".

== Discography ==
=== Studio albums ===
Title	Album details	Peak chart positions	Sales
Title	Album details	KOR	Sales
Ahn Ye-eun	Released: November 28, 2016; Label: pandawhale company; Formats: CD, digital download	21	KOR: 1,148
O	Released: July 12, 2018; Label: pandawhale company; Formats: CD, digital download	—	—N/a
ㅇㅇㅇ	Released: February 25, 2020; Label: Double X Entertainment; Formats: CD, digital download	72	—N/a
"—" denotes release did not chart.

=== EPs ===
Title	Album details
One Day (Every Day) (一日 (일일))	Released: August 21, 2017; Label: pandawhale company; Formats: CD, digital download
To the Island (섬으로)	Released: April 3, 2021; Label: JMG (Double X Entertainment); Formats: CD, digital download

=== Singles ===
Title	Year	Peak chart positions	Album
Title	Year	KOR	Album
"Somehow" (어쩌다보니)	2016	—	Ahn Ye Eun
"Okay!" (그래!)	2017	—	One Day (Every Day)
"Same Thought" (같은 생각)	2017	—	Non-album single
"Spring Alone" (홀로봄)	2018	—	O
"You" (유)	2018	—	O
"Woman's March" (8호 감방의 노래)	2019	—	Non-album single
"Kakotopia" (카코토피아)	2020	—	ㅇㅇㅇ
"Trumpet Creeper" (능소화)	2020	—	Non-album singles
"Waltz" (윤무)	2020	—	Non-album singles
"Proust" (프루스트)	2021	—	Non-album singles
"Sailing" (출항)	2021	—	To the Island
"Changgwi" (창귀)	2021	—	Non-album single
"Not Me Not Mine" (그 사랑은 내 사랑이 아니었음을)	2024	—	Non-album single

=== Soundtrack appearances ===
Title	Year	Peak chart positions	Album
Title	Year	KOR	Album
"If Spring Comes (Drama Version)" (봄이 온다면 (Drama Version))	2017	—	The Rebel OST
"Magic Lily" (상사화)	2017	—	The Rebel OST
"Spring of Ilkhwari" (익화리의 봄)	2017	—	The Rebel OST
"New Day" (새날)	2017	—	The Rebel OST
"Red Tie (Drama Version)" (홍연 (Drama Version))	2017	—	The Rebel OST
"Red Tie (Original Version)" (홍연 (Original Version))	2017	—	The Rebel OST
"Light Saver" (위화(衛華))	2019	—	The Crowned Clown OST
"Keep Alive"	2019	—	The Banker OST
"Against the Wind" (바람이 불어와도)	2021	— (Note: "Against The Wind" did not enter Gaon Digital Chart, but peaked 62 position on the Gaon Download Chart:)	River Where the Moon Rises OST
"Night Flower" (야화)	2021	—	Painter of the Night OST
"The Moon During the Day" (낮에 뜨는 달)	2023	127	Moon in the Day OST
"To the Moon"	2025	— (Note: "To the Moon" did not enter Circle Digital Chart but peaked at number 174 on the BGM Chart.)	To the Moon OST

=== Compilation appearances ===
Title	Year	Peak chart positions	Album
Title	Year	KOR	Album
"Mister Mystery" (미스터 미스터리)	2016	73	K-pop Star 5 TOP10 Part.1
"White Dress" (하얀 원피스)	2016	—	K-pop Star 5 TOP8 Part.1
"If Spring Comes" (봄이 온다면)	2016	—	K-pop Star 5 TOP6
"Hogu" (호구)	2016	—	K-pop Star 5 TOP4
"Talk to Me" (말을 해 봐)	2016	—	K-pop Star 5 TOP2 Part.1
"Part-Time Lover"	2016	—	K-pop Star 5 TOP2 Part.2
"Heart Song" (마음으로 부르는 노래) with Rooftop Moonlight, Kwon Soon Kwan, Jo So Jung, Hello Ga-Young, Sunwoo Jung-a, Jo Min Hwi, Lee Seol Ah, Jo Ye Ran	2017	—	A Song That I Sing with My Heart
"Jinttobaegi" (진또배기)	2020	—	Lotto Singer Episode 4
"Spring Rain" (봄비) with Lee Bong-geun	2021	—	Immortal Songs: Singing the Legend - Fantastic Duet (Friend Special)

== Filmography ==
=== Variety/Reality show ===
Year	Title	Network	Notes	Ref.
2015–16	K-pop Star 5	SBS	Runner-up	
2020	King of Mask Singer	MBC	Contestant as "Ring Expedition" (episodes 277–278)	
