= Our Love Is Great =

EP by Yerin Baek
- Released: March 18, 2019
- Genre: R&B
- Length: 25:24
- Language: Korean, English
- Label: JYP Entertainment

Yerin Baek chronology
Frank (2015)	Our Love Is Great (2019)	Every Letter I Sent You (2019)

Our Love Is Great (stylized as Our love is great) is the second extended play by South Korean singer-songwriter and record producer Yerin Baek, released on March 18, 2019, under JYP Entertainment. It contains seven tracks mostly written and composed by Baek, and marked her second collaboration with music producer Cloud, who also produced her first extended play, Frank, and her first digital single "Bye Bye My Blue".

Our Love Is Great marked Baek's last work released under JYP Entertainment before officially ending her contract on September 14, 2019, announcing that she will be starting an independent label.

At the 17th Korean Music Awards, Baek was awarded Album of the Year (Grand Prize), Best Pop Album for Our Love Is Great, and Best Pop Song for the single "Maybe It's Not Our Fault".

== Background and release ==
Following the release of her three-track single "Bye Bye My Blue" and "Love You on Christmas" in 2016, she was featured on South Korean alternative R&B singer Dean's single "Come Over", recorded "Blooming Memories" as part of the soundtrack for the drama Chicago Typewriter, and focused on live performances.

On March 8, 2019, it was announced that Baek is preparing for a comeback. JYP Entertainment released a teaser photo of Baek holding a flower for the digital mini album Our love is great on March 11, 2019. According to Baek, it took six months to prepare the album. The following day, "Maybe It's Not Our Fault" was revealed to be the title track, and the EP contained "I Don't Know" which was previously released on Baek's personal SoundCloud.

Prior to the release of the EP, the album sampler was released on JYP Entertainment's official YouTube channel. On March 18, 2019, Our Love Is Great and the music video for "Maybe It's Not Our Fault" were released.

== Commercial performance ==
Upon the release of the EP, the lead single "Maybe It's Not Our Fault" achieved all-kill and topped eight major music charts such as Melon, Genie, Bugs!, among others. Other tracks from the album also ranked within the top ten on Bugs! Following the day of the release, Our Love Is Great topped the iTunes album charts in Indonesia, Thailand, Malaysia, Taiwan, Hong Kong, and Kazakhstan.

== Track listing ==
All lyrics are written by Yerin Baek; all music is composed by Baek Yerin, Cloud.

Our Love Is Great track listing
No.	Title	Length
1.	"Merry and the Witch's Flower" (야간비행 [魔女の花])	4:05
2.	"Maybe It's Not Our Fault" (그건 아마 우리의 잘못은 아닐 거야)	3:53
3.	"Dear My Blue"	2:18
4.	"Our Love Is Great"	4:08
5.	"I Don't Know" (내가 날 모르는 것처럼; featuring Car, the Garden)	3:56
6.	"See You Again" (지켜줄게)	3:45
7.	"I Don't Know" (내가 날 모르는 것처럼; 2019 ver.)	3:19
Total length:		25:24

== Awards and nominations ==
17th Korean Music Awards, South Korea (2020)
Award	Nomination	Result
Album of the Year	Our Love Is Great	Won
Song of the Year	"Maybe It's Not Our Fault"	Nominated
Artist of the Year	Yerin Baek	Nominated
Best Pop Album	Our Love Is Great	Won
Best Pop Song	"Maybe It's Not Our Fault"	Won

== Personnel ==
Musicians

- Yerin Baek – vocals, background vocals (all tracks)
- Cloud – electric guitar, keyboards, background vocals, bass (all tracks)
- Jonny – electric guitar (tracks 1, 2, 3, 4, 6)
- Lee Jung-woo (이정우) – bass (tracks 1, 4)
- Kim Chiheon (김치헌) – drums (tracks 1, 4, 6)
- Yun Seok-cheol (윤석철) – piano (track 3)
- d.ear – strings (track 4, 6)

Technical

- Yerin Baek – recording (all tracks)
- Cloud – computer programming, recording, mixing (all tracks)
- Yasman Maeda – mastering (tracks 1, 3, 4, 5, 6, 7)
- Shin Jaemin (신재민) – mastering (track 2)

== Charts ==
Chart performance for Our Love Is Great
Chart (2019)	Peak position
South Korean Albums (Circle)	17
