= MC the Max discography =

- Studio albums: 12
- Soundtrack albums: 8
- Live albums: 2
- Compilation albums: 3
- Singles: 22
- Special albums: 3

This is the discography of the South Korean rock band MC the Max. MC the Max have been in the music business ever since debuting in May 2000, under the name Moon Child before changing its group name to its current one in 2002.

== Albums ==
=== Studio albums ===
| Title | Album details | Peak chart positions | | Sales |
| Title | Album details | KOR RIAK | KOR Gaon | Sales |
As Moon Child
| Delete | Released: April 14, 2000; Label: GM Contents Media; Format: CD, cassette | 12 | — | KOR: 53,899 |
| Because of Love (사랑하니까) | Released: May 11, 2001; Label: GM Contents Media; Format: CD, cassette | 6 | — | KOR: 143,151 |
As M.C the Max
| M.C the Max! | Released: October 31, 2002; Label: You & I Entertainment; Format: CD, cassette | 12 | — | KOR 154,075 |
| Love Is Time Sixth Sense | Released: December 11, 2003; Label: You & I Entertainment; Format: CD, cassette | 2 | — | KOR 244,504 |
| Solitude Love... | Released: November 18, 2004; Label: You & I Entertainment; Format: CD, cassette | 2 | — | KOR 184,716 |
| The Rusted Love | Released: November 23, 2005; Label: You & I Entertainment; Format: CD, cassette | 2 | — | KOR: 130,765 |
| Returns | Part 1: Released: April 18, 2007; Label: Vitamin Entertainment; Format: CD, cassette | 2 | — | KOR: 80,303 |
| Returns | Part 2: Released: May 22, 2007; Label: Vitamin Entertainment; Format: CD, cassette | 2 | — | KOR: 80,303 |
| Via 6 | Released: September 30, 2008; Label: Vitamin Entertainment; Format: CD | —N/a | — | |
| Unveiling | Released: January 2, 2014; Label: Music&NEW; Format: CD, digital download | —N/a | 4 | KOR: 11,978 |
| Pathos | Released: January 28, 2016; Label: Music&NEW; Format: CD, digital download | —N/a | 4 | KOR: 6,815 |
| Circular | Released: January 2, 2019; Label: 325 E&C; Format: CD, digital download | —N/a | 10 | KOR: 5,003 |
| Ceremonia | Released: March 25, 2021; Label: 325 E&C; Format: CD, digital download | —N/a | 26 | |

=== Live albums ===
| Title | Album details | Peak chart positions | Sales |
| Title | Album details | KOR Gaon | Sales |
|---|---|---|---|
| Moonchild Is Invincible (Live) (월아무적 (Live)) | Released: February 19, 2009; Label: Vitamin Entertainment; Format: CD+DVD, digital download | 53 | |
| Pathos Tour Live Album | Released: October 7, 2016; Label: 325 E&C; Format: CD, digital download | 15 | KOR: 1,361 |

=== Compilation albums ===
| Title | Album details | Peak chart positions | Sales |
| Title | Album details | KOR Gaon | Sales |
|---|---|---|---|
| Curtain Call Vol. 1 | Released: April 16, 2007; Label: Ogam Entertainment; Format: CD, digital download | — | |
| Best Curtain Call | Released: May 10, 2007; Label: Ogam Entertainment; Format: CD, digital download | — | |
| Best of Best | Released: February 25, 2014; Label: Vitamin Entertainment; Format: CD, digital download | 16 | KOR: 3,842 |

=== Special albums ===
| Title | Album details | Peak chart positions | Sales |
| Title | Album details | KOR RIAK | Sales |
|---|---|---|---|
| Memory Traveler | Released: July 27, 2005; Label: You & I Entertainment; Format: CD, cassette | 4 | KOR: 37,510 |
| Unlimited (언리미티드) | Released: December 11, 2008; Label: Vitamin Entertainment; Format: CD, digital download | —N/a | |
| Rewind & Remind | Released: June 18, 2009; Label: Vitamin Entertainment; Format: CD, digital download | —N/a | |

== Singles ==
| Title | Year | Peak chart positions | Sales | Certifications | Album |
| Title | Year | KOR | Sales | Certifications | Album |
|---|---|---|---|---|---|
| "Because I Love You" (사랑하니까) | 2001 | —N/a | | —N/a | Because I Love You |
| "Goodbye For a Moment" (잠시만 안녕) | 2002 | 63* | KOR: 269,071 | —N/a | M.C The Max |
| "You Are Tearful" (그대는 눈물 겹다) | 2003 | 99* | | —N/a | Love Is Time Sixth Sense |
| "Love Poem" (사랑의 시) | 2003 | —N/a | | —N/a | Love Is Time Sixth Sense |
| "Sunflowers Drop Sometimes" (해바라기도 가끔 목이 아프죠) | 2004 | —N/a | | —N/a | Solitude Love |
| "Don't Be Happy" (행복하지 말아요) | 2004 | 130* | | —N/a | Solitude Love |
| "Reunion in Memory" (추억속의 재회) | 2005 | —N/a | | —N/a | Memory Traveler |
| "Love Is Going to Hurt" (사랑은 아프려고 하는 거죠) | 2005 | —N/a | | —N/a | The Rusted Love |
| "Bolttaegi Love" (볼때기 사랑) | 2007 | —N/a | | —N/a | Non-album singles |
| "The Ugly Duckling" (미운오리 새끼) | 2007 | —N/a | | —N/a | Non-album singles |
| "Tears" (눈물) | 2007 | —N/a | | —N/a | Returns |
| "Run to the Sky" (Cooler Remix) | 2007 | —N/a | | —N/a | Non-album singles |
| "Fall in Love" (사랑을 외치다) | 2007 | —N/a | | —N/a | Non-album singles |
| "Secret to My Tears" (눈물은 모르게) | 2008 | —N/a | | —N/a | Via 6 |
| "Goodbye to Romance" | 2008 | —N/a | | —N/a | Unlimited |
| "Following Car Is Honking a Horn" (뒤차가 경적을) | 2009 | —N/a | | —N/a | Rewind & Remind |
| "So Sick" (소식) (with Daylight) | 2009 | —N/a | | —N/a | Non-album singles |
| "I Love You" (사랑합니다) (featuring Boohwal) | 2010 | 20 | | —N/a | Non-album singles |
| "Wind That Blows" (그대가 분다) | 2014 | 1 | KOR: 1,583,932 | —N/a | Unveiling |
| "No Matter Where" (어디에도) | 2016 | 3 | KOR: 2,748,300 | —N/a | Pathos |
| "You You and You" (그대 그대 그대) | 2016 | 15 | KOR: 282,960 | —N/a | Pathos Tour Live Album |
| "After You've Gone" (넘쳐흘러) | 2019 | 1 | | KCMA: Platinum (Streaming) | Circular |
| "Bloom" (처음처럼) | 2020 | 1 | | KCMA: Platinum (Streaming) | Ceremonia |
| "In Dreams" (너의 흔적) | 2021 | 108 | | | Ceremonia |
| "Eternity" (흩어지지 않게) | 2022 | 43 | | | Eternity |
* The Gaon Digital Chart was established in 2010, thus these peaks were achieved later.

== Soundtrack appearances ==
| Title | Year | Peak chart positions | Sales | Album |
| Title | Year | KOR | Sales | Album |
|---|---|---|---|---|
| "I Dared to Love You" (사랑하고 있네요) | 2006 | —N/a | —N/a | Which Star Are You From OST |
| "Run to the Sky" | 2006 | —N/a | —N/a | Eon Kid OST |
| "The Shadow of the Sun" (태양의 그림자) | 2012 | 28 | KOR: 272,819 | Korean Peninsula OST |
| "The Only One" (만에하나) | 2013 | 62 | KOR: 30,114 | The King's Doctor OST |
| "U" | 2014 | 26 | KOR: 155,912 | It's Okay, That's Love OST |
| "Just Looking" (바라보기) | 2014 | 17 | KOR: 327,136 | Birth of a Beauty OST |
| "Because of You" (그 남잔 말야) | 2015 | 15 | KOR: 1,114,380 | A Girl Who Sees Smells OST |
| "Wind Beneath Your Wings" (그대, 바람이 되어) | 2016 | 7 | KOR: 439,574 | Descendants of the Sun OST |

== Other charted songs ==
| Title | Year | Peak chart positions | Album |
| Title | Year | KOR | Album |
|---|---|---|---|
| "Lying On Your Lips" (입술의 말) | 2014 | 8 | Unveiling |
| "Then We" (그때 우리) | 2014 | 4 | Unveiling |
| "Vacancy" (빈자리) | 2014 | 16 | Unveiling |
| "On My Way Home" (퇴근길) | 2014 | 9 | Unveiling |
| "Night We Shine" (백야) | 2014 | 5 | Unveiling |
| "January" (1월) | 2014 | 20 | Unveiling |
| "One More Day" (하루만 빌려줘) | 2014 | 11 | Unveiling |
| "My Story" (내 이야기) | 2014 | 25 | Unveiling |
| "Final Song" (다시, 노래...) | 2014 | 29 | Unveiling |
| "Don't Be Happy (2013 Live Ver.)" (해바라기도 가끔 목이 아프죠) | 2014 | 59 | Unveiling |
| "My Last Breath (2013 Live Ver.)" (마지막 내 숨소리) | 2014 | 90 | Unveiling |
| "Sunflowers Drop Sometimes (2013 Live Ver.)" (해바라기도 가끔 목이 아프죠) | 2014 | 91 | Unveiling |
| "Love Poem (2013 Live Ver.)" (사랑의 시) | 2014 | 81 | Unveiling |
| "Dimly" (아스라이) | 2016 | 29 | Pathos |
| "All Right" (괜찮다가도) | 2016 | 21 | Pathos |
| "Pale Blue Note" | 2016 | 46 | Pathos |
| "Certainly" (어김없이) | 2016 | 28 | Pathos |
| "Always" | 2016 | 70 | Pathos |
| "Before This Night" 이 밤이 지나기 전에) | 2016 | 60 | Pathos |
| "Even If I Want to Say" (말하고 싶어도) | 2016 | 73 | Pathos |
| "Love & Hate" (미움 받을 용기) | 2016 | 81 | Pathos Tour Live Album |
