= Love You on Christmas =

2016 single by Baek Ye-rin

Single by Yerin Baek
- B-side: "November song"
- Released: December 7, 2016
- Recorded: 2016
- Genre: Ballad; Jazz
- Label: JYP Entertainment; KT Music
- Songwriter: Baek Ye-rin

Yerin Baek singles chronology
"Bye Bye My Blue'" (2016)	"Love You on Christmas" (2016)	"Maybe It's Not Our Fault" (2019)

"Love You on Christmas" is the second digital single by South Korean singer Yerin Baek. It was released digitally by JYP Entertainment on December 7, 2016, and distributed by KT Music.

== Background and composition ==
Yerin announced would be releasing her holiday single titled Love You on Christmas on November 7. Yerin released album spoiler for lead single Love You on Christmas and B-side English single November song on November 6. The single was written and composed by Yerin.

== Track listing ==
No.	Title	Lyrics	Music	Arrangement	Length
1.	"Love You on Christmas"	Baek Ye-rin	Baek Ye-rin	윤석철; 구름	3:21
2.	"November Song"	Baek Ye-rin	Baek Ye-rin	Baek Ye-rin	3:14
