= Tellusboutyourself =

- Standard edition cover

Studio album by Yerin Baek
- Released: December 10, 2020
- Recorded: Mid-2019–2020
- Genre: R&B; deep house; dream pop; synth-pop; modern rock
- Length: 51:35
- Language: English
- Label: Blue Vinyl; Dreamus
- Producer: Yerin Baek; Cloud; Bang Min-hyuk

Yerin Baek chronology
Every Letter I Sent You (2019)	Tellusboutyourself (2020)	Love, Yerin (2021)

Singles from Tellusaboutyourself
- 1. "0415" Released: December 10, 2020; 2. "Hate You" Released: December 10, 2020

Tellusboutyourself is the second studio album by South Korean singer Yerin Baek. It was released digitally through Blue Vinyl on December 10, 2020, and physically on January 8, 2021, by Dreamus. Written and recorded in English, the album is primarily a pop-R&B record. It contains fourteen tracks including the double title tracks "Hate You" and "0415", which were released simultaneously with the album's digital release.

== Background and release ==
On November 23, 2020, Baek Yerin officially announced that she would release her second album Tellusboutyourself on December 10. The album contains 14 songs, including the title songs "0415" and "Hate You". The album attracted attention to Yerin's foretelling of a new musical transformation, showcasing a wider world of music from existing music and encompassing genres such as R&B, deep house, synth-pop, modern rock and dream pop.

== Critical reception ==
Professional ratings
Review scores
Source	Rating
IZM	3/5 stars

Billboard chose Tellusboutyourself as one of "The 10 Best K-pop Albums of 2020 (Critics' Picks)". Contributor Joshua Minsoo Kim wrote, "You can hear the sound of [t]ellusboutyourself from saying the title out loud: it's casual, conversational, intimate. As always, Yerin Baek sings with a firm conviction that belies her graceful vocals, transforming the simplest of lyrics into immersive pools of emotion. The truths she relays can be hard to swallow, so she allows gauzy instrumentation to provide a welcoming atmosphere."

Year-end lists
Critic/Publication	List	Rank	Ref.
Billboard	The 10 Best K-pop Albums of 2020: Critics' Picks	9	

== Track listing ==
All tracks are written by Yerin Baek. All tracks are produced by Yerin Baek, Cloud, and Bang Min-hyuk. (Bang Min-hyuk didn't produce track 1, 9 and 12)

Tellusboutyourself track listing
No.	Title	Length
1.	"Lovegame"	3:33
2.	"You're So Lonely Now, So You Need Me Back by Your Side Again"	3:42
3.	"I Am Not Your Ocean Anymore"	3:17
4.	"Hall&Oates"	2:46
5.	"Ms. Delicate"	3:59
6.	"Interlude"	1:43
7.	"Loner"	3:56
8.	"“Homesweethome”"	4:17
9.	"Loveless"	3:48
10.	"Hate You"	3:39
11.	"0415"	4:24
12.	"I'll Be Your Family!"	3:49
13.	"I'm in Love"	4:40
14.	"Bubbles&Mushrooms"	3:57
Total length:		51:35

Notes

- "You're So Lonely Now, So You Need Me Back by Your Side Again", "I Am Not Your Ocean Anymore", "Hate You", "I'll Be Your Family!", "I'm in Love" are stylized in sentence case.
- "Homesweethome" is stylized in all caps with quotation marks.

== Charts ==
=== Weekly charts ===
Chart (2021)	Peak position
South Korean Albums (Gaon)	7

=== Monthly charts ===
Chart (2021)	Peak position
South Korean Albums (Gaon)	34

== Sales ==
Region	Sales
South Korea	12,518

== Awards and nominations ==
Year	Award	Category	Nominated work	Result
2021	5th Korean Hip-hop Awards	R&B Album of the Year	Tellusboutyourself	Nominated
2021	13th Melon Music Awards	Album of the Year	Tellusboutyourself	Nominated

== Release history ==
Region	Date	Format	Label	Ref.
Various	December 10, 2020	Streaming; digital download	Blue Vinyl; Dreamus	
South Korea	January 8, 2021	CD	Blue Vinyl; Dreamus	
