= Every Letter I Sent You =

Studio album by Yerin Baek
- Released: December 10, 2019
- Genre: R&B
- Length: 61:26
- Language: Korean, English
- Label: Blue Vinyl; Dreamus
- Producer: Yerin Baek; Cloud

Yerin Baek chronology
Our Love Is Great (2019)	Every Letter I Sent You (2019)	Tellusboutyourself (2020)

Singles from Every Letter I Sent You
- 1. "Square (2017)" Released: December 10, 2019; 2. "Popo (How Deep Is Our Love?)" Released: December 10, 2019; 3. "0310" Released: December 10, 2019

Every Letter I Sent You is the first studio album and the first double album by South Korean singer-songwriter and record producer Yerin Baek. It was released through Blue Vinyl and published by Dreamus on December 10, 2019. It features 18 tracks, with "Popo (How Deep Is Our Love?)", "0310" and "Square (2017)" simultaneously released as the album's three singles. The physical album comes in a CD and LP format.

This is her first release under her new label, Blue Vinyl, after leaving JYP Entertainment in September 2019.

Every Letter I Sent You was met with generally positive reviews from music critics and debuted at number two in South Korea, selling over 35,000 copies. The album received nominations for Album of the Year at 12th Melon Music Awards, while its single "Square (2017)" won Best R&B/Soul award, and was also nominated for Song of the Year award.

== Background and release ==
Every Letter I Sent You is Yerin Baek's first studio album released after the establishment of her independent label Blue Vinyl. On December 10, 2019, the "Popo (How Deep Is Our Love?)" and "0310" music videos were released on YouTube. The album includes a total of 18 tracks, was the result of Baek's four years from 19 to 22 years old, and was called her most honest and elaborate album to date.

== Track listing ==
All tracks are written by Yerin Baek; "Point" co-written by Loopy. All tracks are produced by Yerin Baek and Cloud.

Disc one
No.	Title	Length
1.	"Intro"	1:42
2.	"Rest"	3:28
3.	"Popo (How Deep Is Our Love?)"	4:31
4.	"Can I B U"	2:13
5.	"Meant to Be"	3:01
6.	"Mr.Gloomy"	3:35
7.	"Lovelovelove"	4:34
8.	"Bunny"	3:57
9.	"0310"	3:58

Disc two
No.	Title	Length
1.	"Berlin"	1:38
2.	"Datoom"	3:49
3.	"Not a Girl"	3:49
4.	"Newsong2"	3:35
5.	"Amy"	2:21
6.	"True Lover"	3:20
7.	"Point" (featuring Loopy)	4:13
8.	"Square (2017)"	4:21
9.	"London"	3:21
Total length:		61:26

Notes

- The subtitle of "Popo (How Deep Is Our Love?)", "Meant to Be", "Mr.Gloomy", "Not a Girl", and "True Lover" are stylized in sentence case.
- "Can I B U", "Lovelovelove" are stylized in all lowercase.

== Charts ==
=== Weekly charts ===
Chart (2019)	Peak position
South Korean Albums (Gaon)	2

=== Monthly charts ===
Chart (2020)	Peak position
South Korean Albums (Gaon)	13
South Korean Albums (Gaon)	79 (Note: LP (limited edition))
South Korean Albums (Gaon)	25 (Note: LP (regular))

== Sales ==
Region	Sales
South Korea	35,365 (Note: Sales combined with the LP (limited edition) and LP (regular) version)

== Awards and nominations ==
Year	Award	Category	Nominated work	Result
2020	12th Melon Music Awards	Album of the Year	Every Letter I Sent You	Nominated
2020	12th Melon Music Awards	Best R&B/Soul	"Square (2017)"	Won
2020	12th Melon Music Awards	Song of the Year	"Square (2017)"	Nominated
2020	22nd Mnet Asian Music Awards	Best Vocal Performance – Solo	"Square (2017)"	Nominated
2020	22nd Mnet Asian Music Awards	Song of the Year	"Square (2017)"	Longlisted
2020	4th Korean Hip-hop Awards	R&B Album of the Year	Every Letter I Sent You	Nominated
2021	10th Gaon Chart Music Awards	Song of the Year – December	"Square (2017)"	Nominated
2021	35th Golden Disc Awards	Digital Bonsang	"Square (2017)"	Nominated
2021	18th Korean Music Awards	Album of the Year	Every Letter I Sent You	Nominated
2021	18th Korean Music Awards	Best Pop Album	Every Letter I Sent You	Won
2021	18th Korean Music Awards	Song of the Year	"Square (2017)"	Nominated
2021	18th Korean Music Awards	Best Pop Song	"Square (2017)"	Nominated

== Release history ==
Region	Date	Format	Label	Ref.
Various	December 10, 2019	Streaming; digital download	Blue Vinyl, Dreamus Company	
South Korea	January 13, 2020	CD	Blue Vinyl, Dreamus Company	
South Korea	May 11, 2020	LP (Limited Edition)	Blue Vinyl, Dreamus Company	
South Korea	August 7, 2020	LP (reissue)	Blue Vinyl, Dreamus Company	
