= Hello Ga-Young =

- 안녕하신가영
- Born: Baek Ga-young; October 23, 1987 (age 37); Busan, South Korea
- Occupations: Singer-songwriter; Bassist
- Musical career
- Genres: K-pop; Folk-pop
- Instruments: Vocals; Bass
- Years active: 2013–present
- Labels: helloeumak; Interpark Entertainment
- Website: Official artist page on Facebook

Korean name
- Hangul: 백가영
- RR: Baek Gayeong
- MR: Paek Kayŏng

Stage name
- Hangul: 안녕하신가영
- Lit.: Hello, how's your day going?
- RR: Annyeonghasingayeong
- MR: Annyŏnghasin'gayŏng

Baek Ga-young (Korean: 백가영; born October 23, 1987), better known by her stage name Hello Ga-young (안녕하신가영), is a South Korean singer-songwriter. Before beginning her solo project, she was a member of Joa Band, a Korean indie band, from 2009 to 2013. She debuted as a singer-songwriter in December 2013, with her first single "A Song of Old Lovers" (우리 너무 오래 아꼈던 그 말). Her albums were released by her independent music label helloeumak (안녕음악), before she established a partnership with Interpark Entertainment in 2017. Except for some soundtrack appearances, all of her songs released to date were written by herself. From 2013 to present, Hello Ga-young has released two albums, three extended plays, and seventeen singles.

== Career ==
=== 2009–2013: a bassist of Joa Band ===
The musical career of Baek Ga-young began when she joined Joa Band as a bassist in 2009. Because Joa Band members would typically sing songs they wrote themselves, she began writing and singing her songs while in the band. Her first song in Joa Band was "Life Is Unpredictable (Hot Choco)" (인생은 알 수가 없어 (핫초코)). She composed and sang three more songs, "잘 지내니 좀 어떠니" (Literal meaning: "Are you doing all right?"), "길을 잃기 위해서" (Literal meaning: "For the purpose of getting lost"), and "A World Without Time" (10분이 늦어 이별하는 세상). "잘 지내니 좀 어떠니", which was her first song to be introduced on a television show, "2 Days & 1 Night" of KBS2.

=== 2013–2015: single debut, Those Moments ===
In 2013, she started a small music label, helloeumak, with her friend Cheon See-woo (천시우) as an A&R executive. Her debut single, "A Song of Old Lovers", was released on December 30, 2013. On March 20, 2014, her first extended play "Opponent Process Theory" (반대과정이론) was released, including two singles "A Song of Old Lovers" and "Just Because I Like You" (네가 좋아), and three more new songs: "I'm Coming to You" (너에게 간다), "Opponent Process Theory", and "Dish" (그릇).

In 2015, Hello Ga-young released her first album, "Those Moments" (순간의 순간). The album ranked second within the first two weeks after the release at K-Indie Chart vol.48, a Korean independent music chart released twice a month by Mirrorball Music. Those Moments remained in the top 30 of the chart for 14 weeks (vol.48~vol.54, from February 11, 2015 to May 25, 2015). On July 9, 2015, she was featured on Picnic Live Sopung, a Korean music program owned by MBC Music, and performed "Sleepless Summer Night" and "A World Without Time".

=== 2016–2018: Feelings, Collection Of Short Stories ===
Her musical career began in 2016 with the release of the second extended play Feelings (좋아하는 마음) on January 19. In March, she announced her one-year music project, Collection Of Short Stories (단편집). The first single of the project was "Collection Of Short Stories – Winter To Spring" (단편집 – 겨울에서 봄). Following the first single, "Collection Of Short Stories – Satellite" (단편집 – 인공위성), "Collection Of Short Stories – Hang In There When You Feel Down" (단편집 – 우울한 날들에 최선을 다해줘), and "Collection Of Short Stories – Where Is Love" (단편집 – 어디에 있을까) were respectively released in summer, autumn, and winter. She also wrote and published her first essay, "Sleepless Summer Night", during the project. The book's title was inspired by her single "Sleepless Summer Night" (언젠가 설명이 필요한 밤), previously released in 2014, and each chapter's title was inspired by the titles of four singles of Collection of Short Stories. The project ended as her third extended play, Collection Of Short Stories (Almost Like Missing You), was released on March 17, 2017, including the four Collections Of Short Stories singles as well as her new song "Almost Like Missing You" (그리움에 가까운). The album ranked third at the K-Indie Chart vol.98. The chart has also noted that the album contains strong seasonal feelings.

=== 2019–present: something special ===
When her second album something special (특별히 대단할 것) was released in 2019, she performed a solo concert celebrating the release at Ewha Girls' High School's 100th-Anniversary Hall, from February 16 to 17.

== Discography ==
=== Studio albums ===
Title	Album details	Peak chart positions	Sales
Title	Album details	KOR	Sales
Those Moments (순간의 순간)	Released: February 23, 2015; Label: helloeumak; Formats: CD, digital download	67	—
Something Special (특별히 대단할 것)	Released: January 23, 2019; Label: Interpark Entertainment; Formats: CD, digital download	51	—

=== Extended plays ===
Title	Album details	Peak chart positions	Sales
Title	Album details	KOR	Sales
Opponent Process Theory (반대과정이론)	Released: March 21, 2014; Label: helloeumak; Formats: CD, digital download	—	—
Feelings (좋아하는 마음)	Released: January 19, 2016; Label: helloeumak; Formats: CD, digital download	47	—
Collection of Short Stories – Almost Like Missing You (단편집 – 그리움에 가까운)	Released: March 17, 2017; Label: helloeumak; Formats: CD, digital download	53	—
On the Edge of ( ) (가장( )자리에서)	Released: December 7, 2021; Label: Interpark; Formats: CD, digital download	94	—

=== Single albums ===
Title	Album details	Peak chart positions	Sales
Title	Album details	KOR	Sales
At the Han River (한강에서)	Released: March 21, 2018; Label: Interpark Entertainment; Formats: CD, digital download	64	—

=== Singles ===
Title	Year	Peak chart positions	Sales	Album
Title	Year	KOR	Sales	Album
"A Song of Old Lovers" (우리 너무 오래 아꼈던 그 말)	2013	—	—	Opponent Process Theory
"Just Because I Like You" (네가 좋아) with Won Park of One more Chance	2014	—	—	Opponent Process Theory
"Opponent Process Theory" (반대과정이론)	2014	—	—	Opponent Process Theory
"Sleepless Summer Night" (언젠가 설명이 필요한 밤)	2014	—	—	Those Moments
"The Work Of Boring Creation" (재미없는 창작의 결과)	2014	—	—	Those Moments
"We Were Fine" (문제없는 사이)	2015	—	—	Those Moments
"Those Moments" (순간의 순간)	2015	—	—	Those Moments
"Cotton & Candy" (솜과 사탕)	2015	—	—	Non-album single
"Feelings" (좋아하는 마음)	2016	—	KOR: 15,147	Feelings
"Collection Of Short Stories – Winter To Spring" (단편집 – 겨울에서 봄)	2016	—	—	Collection Of Short Stories – Almost Like Missing You
"Collection Of Short Stories – Satelite" (단편집 – 인공위성)	2016	—	—	Collection Of Short Stories – Almost Like Missing You
"Collection Of Short Stories – Hang In There When You Feel Down" (단편집 – 우울한 날들에 최선을 다해줘)	2016	—	—	Collection Of Short Stories – Almost Like Missing You
"Collection Of Short Stories – Where Is Love" (단편집 – 어디에 있을까)	2016	—	—	Collection Of Short Stories – Almost Like Missing You
"Almost Like Missing You" (그리움에 가까운)	2016	—	—	Collection Of Short Stories – Almost Like Missing You
"literal meaning: Now is our everything" (지금이 우리의 전부)	2017	—	—	Non-album single
"At the Han River" (한강에서)	2018	—	—	At the Han River
"Stars In The Night Sky" (밤하늘의 별들은)	2018	—	—	something special
"my day is too long" (나의 하루는 너무 길다)	2018	—	—	something special
"In a dream" (꿈 속) with Mind U	2019	—	—	something special
"tease me" (슬픈 노래만 날 위로할 수 있어요)	2019	—	—	Non-album single
"The Memory about Winter" (그래도 겨울이 따뜻한 이유)	2019	—	—	Tiny Bits of Life Part.12
"It's the sun that's sinking, it's not you" (지고 있는 건 노을이에요, 그대가 아니잖아요.)	2020	—	—	Non-album singles
"Spring Is Gone by chance (2021)" (우연히 봄 (2021))	2021	185	—	Non-album singles

=== Soundtrack appearances ===
Title	Year	Peak chart positions	Sales (DL)	Album
Title	Year	KOR	Sales (DL)	Album
"literal meaning: Recalling myself... in the memory" (그 기억 속에... 나를 불러본다)	2016	—	—	Missing You OST
"literal meaning: Alone but happy" (혼자라도 좋아) with Lee Han Cheol	2016	—	—	Dingo Food OST
"Literal meaning: Shining bright" (밝아졌죠)	2016	—	—	Woman with a Suitcase OST Part. 4
"Good Bye" (어떤 안녕)	2017	—	—	My Friend's Romance OST Pt.3
"Blue Day" (마음이 아픈 날에는)	2017	—	—	Avengers Social Club OST Part 3
"Where are you?" (넌 어디에)	2017	—	—	My first love OST Part.2
"123 LOVE" (123 사랑)	2019	—	—	Beautiful Love, Wonderful Life OST Part.1
"Did you wake up?" (일어났어?)	2020	—	—	Did you wake up? (one and only romance X Hello Ga-Young, Wonpil(DAY6))
"How Is It?" (어때요)	2021	—	—	No, Thank You OST Part.2
"I Guess I Like You" (그댈 많이 좋아하는가 봐요)	2022	—	—	Poong, the Joseon Psychiatrist OST Part.2

=== Collaborations ===
Title	Year	Album	Other artist(s)
"For to be Strangers" (우리는 남보다도 못한 사이가 되기 위해서)	2014	bright #2	—
"So Nice (GMF 2015 Ver.)"	2015	So Nice(GMF 2015 Ver.)	Gyepi of autumn vacation, Bily Acoustie, Standing Egg, Lee Hyunsong of The Koxx, Joo Woo Jae
"Literal meaning: LDR" (롱디)	2016	정규앨범 4집 '꽃' (Literal meaning: The Fourth Studio Album 'Flower')	Coffeeboy
"The Day We Said Goodbye" (이별이 유일했던 날)	2016	The Day We Said Goodbye	Temperature of Saying "Hi"
"Literal meaning: And You" (그리고 너)	2016	Nodeul Music, Vol. 1	Soran
"So Nice (GMF 2016 Version)"	2016	So Nice (GMF 10th anniversary special version)	Great Mint Band, Kwon Jeong Yeol of 10cm, Kim Min-seok of MeloMance, Dalchong, Bily Acoustie, Lee Won-suk of Daybreak, Lee Han Cheol, Peppertones
"Heart Song" (마음으로 부르는 노래)	2017	A song that I sing with my heart	Rooftop Moonlight, Kwon Soon Kwan, Jo So Jung, Ahn Ye-eun, Sunwoo Jung-a, Jo Min Hwi, Lee Seol Ah, Jo Ye Ran

== Books ==
Date	Title	Type	Publisher
March 17, 2017	Sleepless Summer Night ((쉽게 잠들지 못하는 밤은) 언젠가 설명이 필요한 밤)	Essay	Billybutton
