= Love, Yerin =

- Digital cover

EP by Yerin Baek
- Released: September 10, 2021
- Genre: K-pop
- Length: 22:57
- Language: Korean
- Label: Huawei Music

Yerin Baek chronology
Tellusboutyourself (2020)	Love, Yerin (2021)	Flash and Core (2025)

Love, Yerin (Korean: 선물; RR: seonmul; lit. Gift) is the first cover extended play and fourth overrally by South Korean singer-songwriter Yerin Baek. It was released on September 10, 2019, under Blue Vinyl. The EP featured covers of six tracks from artists such as Nell and The Black Skirts.

== Background and release ==
In 2019, Baek uploaded covers of the songs, "A Walk" by Sorri, and "Whenever" by Toy to her personal SoundCloud.

Following the release of Baek's second studio album, Tellusboutyourself in December 2020, she released her first remix album and third extended play, Tellusboutyourself Remixes on February 16, 2021, containing six remixed songs from the title album. On May 27, 2021, Baek, along with her band, The Volunteers, went on to release their self-titled debut album.

On August 23, 2021, Baek announced the release of a cover album titled "Gift" on her Instagram with a release schedule on September 10, 2021.

On September 1, 2021, Baek released the track list for the EP containing six songs, including two songs which Baek previously uploaded on her SoundCloud, along the original artists of the tracks.

Love, Yerin was released on September 10, 2021. According to the agency, Blue Vinyl, the album name (Gift) pertains to the album as a gift to the fans, since cover songs are performed on stage and festivals, and in a situation where the artist cannot meet the audience in person, they thought it would be a great gift. They also added that the intention for the EP is to honor the original artists, and to be a surprise gift before moving on to the next chapter of Baek's solo career.

== Commercial performance ==
Following the day of the EP's release, all tracks entered the top ten charts of Melon, Genie, and Bugs!, with the first track, "A Walk", occupying the top spot.

== Track listing ==
Love, Yerin track listing
No.	Title	Lyrics	Music	Original Artist	Length
1.	"Whenever" (그럴 때마다)	You Hee-yeol	You Hee-yeol	Toy	3:33
2.	"Antifreeze"	Jo Hyu-il	Jo Hyu-il	The Black Skirts	4:06
3.	"Go Back" (돌아가자)	Lee Young-hoon	Lee Young-hoon	Lee Young-hoon	4:03
4.	"Why Me?" (왜? 날)	Kio	Kio	Kio	4:05
5.	"Limit" (한계)	Kim Jong-wan	Kim Jong-wan	Nell	3:47
6.	"A Walk" (산책)	Sorri	Lee Han-chul	Sorri, Lee Han-chul	3:26
Total length:					22:57

== Charts ==
Chart performance for Love, Yerin
Chart (2021)	Peak position
South Korean Albums (Circle)	15
