= Jarasum International Jazz Festival =

Annual music festival in South Korea

- Genre: Jazz festival
- Dates: October 9–11, 2026
- Locations: Jarasum, Gapyeong-gun, Gyeonggi-do, Republic of Korea
- Years active: 2004-present
- Attendance: over 200,000 → 2.97 million (cumulative)

The Jarasum International Jazz Festival (Korean: 자라섬국제재즈페스티벌) is an annual Jazz Festival in South Korea. The festival began in 2004 with 30 teams of jazz artists from 12 countries. Well established as a significant international festival, every year, over 100,000 people visit this particularly popular festival and 95% of the attendees are actually previous visitors. In 2014, the festival ran from Friday, October 3 to Sunday, October 5. Jarasum (which means "terrapin island" in Korean) is located in the center of the Korean peninsula.

The main lineup for 2014 included Maceo Parker, Paquito D’Rivera and Trio Corrente, The Yellowjackets, Allan Holdsworth, Terje Rypdal and Ketil Bjørnstad, Joachim Kühn, Dominic Miller, Mathias Eick, Tord Gustavsen, Jan Lundgren, Gregoire Maret and Jazz Connection.

== International Recognition ==
In 2023, the festival became a member of the Europe Jazz Network (EJN) and the Forum of Worldwide Music Festivals (FWMF).

The festival has been designated a "Representative Festival of Korea" by the Ministry of Culture, Sports and Tourism (2016, 2018).

== Venue ==
The festival takes place on Jaraseom Island, a group of four small islands (Dongdo, Seodo, Jungdo, and Namdo) located in the Bukhan River in Gapyeong, Gyeonggi Province, approximately 70 km northeast of Seoul.

The outdoor venue features open grassy areas where attendees sit during performances. The festival is held in mid-October, when the surrounding mountains and riverbanks are at peak autumn foliage.

== Atmosphere ==
The festival is held entirely outdoors across multiple stages, with open grassy areas serving as the primary audience space. Programming across the stages varies in genre and intensity, ranging from mainstream jazz to experimental performances.

== Country Focus Program ==
The festival includes an annual "Country Focus" program, spotlighting artists from a selected nation each year in collaboration with that country's embassy or cultural institute.

- 2024: Poland
- 2025: Hungary
- 2026: France

== History ==
- 2023: The festival joined the Europe Jazz Network (EJN) and the Forum of Worldwide Music Festivals (FWMF).
- As of 2026 (23rd edition): The festival has hosted acts from 60 countries and 1,444 artist teams. Cumulative attendance has reached approximately 2.97 million.

== See also ==
- List of music festivals in South Korea
- List of jazz festivals
