= Frank (Yerin Baek EP) =

EP by Yerin Baek
- Released: November 30, 2015
- Genre: R&B
- Length: 22:34
- Language: Korean, English
- Label: JYP Entertainment

Yerin Baek chronology
Frank (2015)	Our Love Is Great (2019)

Frank (stylized in all caps) is the debut extended play by South Korean singer-songwriter Yerin Baek, released on November 30, 2015, under JYP Entertainment. It contains six tracks which were entirely written and composed by Baek, and she took part in the conceptualization of the album content, album jacket, and music video. The EP marked Baek's long-time collaboration with music producer Cloud.

According to Baek, the album title meant "being honest and not hiding anything", and references the title of the debut album by Amy Winehouse who has been cited as one of Baek's influences.

== Background and release ==
In 2012, Baek debuted as part of a South Korean duo called 15&, along with K-pop Star season 1 winner Jamie. Following the duo's hiatus in February 2015, Baek was featured in a number of tracks such as "Excited" by rapper Olltii, "On & On" by rapper Yuk Ji-dam, and "Me You" by rapper San E, all of which topped realtime music charts.

On November 25, 2015, JYP Entertainment released the teaser for Baek's upcoming debut extended play, Frank, along with a teaser photo with the upcoming single "Across the Universe". The following day, the teaser for the music video, "Across the Universe" was revealed. On the 27th, the track list, along with 15-second snippets of the songs was released on Baek's Instagram account.

On November 30, 2015, Frank was released along with the music video of "Across the Universe".

== Track listing ==
All lyrics are written by Yerin Baek; all music is composed by Baek Yerin, Cloud.

Frank track listing
No.	Title	Length
1.	"Blue"	3:46
2.	"Across the Universe" (우주를 건너)	4:07
3.	"As I am"	3:54
4.	"Don't Leave Me Alone" (혼자 두지 마)	3:28
5.	"(zZ)" (잠들고 싶어(zZ))	3:38
6.	"That's Why"	3:45
Total length:		22:34
