= Yerin Baek =

South Korean singer-songwriter (born 1997)

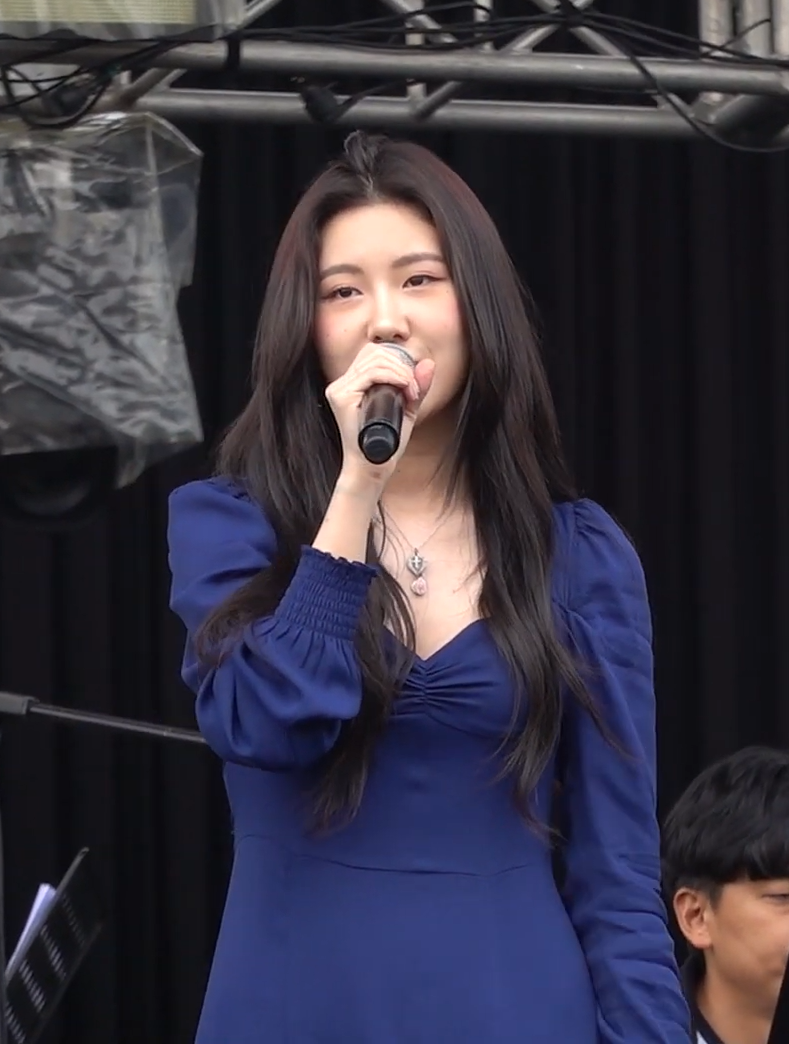
- Baek performing in 2019
- Born: Baek Ye-rin; June 26, 1997 (age 29); Daejeon, South Korea
- Education: Hanlim Multi Art School
- Occupation: Singer-songwriter
- Musical career
- Genres: K-pop; R&B
- Instruments: Vocals; guitar; piano
- Years active: 2012–present
- Label: peoplelikepeople
- Member of: The Volunteers
- Formerly of: 15&

Korean name
- Hangul: 백예린
- Hanja: 白藝潾
- RR: Baek Yerin
- MR: Paek Yerin

Baek Ye-rin (Korean: 백예린; born June 26, 1997), anglicized as Yerin Baek, is a South Korean singer-songwriter. A former member of South Korean duo 15&, she debuted as a solo artist with her extended play, Frank, in 2015. Baek is credited with writing and composition for the majority of her songs, often touching on personal topics and real-life experiences. In addition to her solo career, she is also the lead vocalist and guitarist for the South Korean rock band The Volunteers and has been performing with them since 2018.

== Early life ==
Yerin Baek was born on June 26, 1997, in Daejeon.

=== Before debut ===
In 2007, at age 10, Baek appeared in episode 6 of SBS's Star King as the "10-year-old ballad prodigy," performing Whitney Houston's "I Have Nothing" and winning the competition. At the time, she sang pop songs by Whitney Houston and Beyoncé, which she later credited to the influence of her father, who had participated in a college band.

In the same year, Yangpa and Beyoncé also appeared on KBS2 Relaxed under the title "Ballad prodigy who will cry." When she mentioned this in an interview nine years later, she recalled, "It is a dark history to be on Relaxed. Back then, I didn't know what I was doing and just did what my mom told me to do."

Baek later auditioned for the first open recruitment at JYP Entertainment, singing Beyoncé's "Listen," and began her trainee life after finishing in second place overall. She became one of a trio of trainees whom JYP sent to the United States for training. Baek trained for a total of five years, including two years in New York and New Jersey starting at age 13. During her time in the United States, she experienced difficulties adapting to the language but managed to overcome her fear of English after two years. Since her solo debut, she has released most of her songs with English lyrics.

== Career ==
=== 2007–2015: Career beginnings and 15& ===
In 2007, Baek appeared on the sixth episode of the SBS variety show Amazing Contest Star King along Seunghee, a member of the South Korean girl group Oh My Girl. She was labeled as a "10-year-old ballad genius" and performed "I Have Nothing" by Whitney Houston, and won first place. She also appeared on the KBS2 television show Yeo Yoo Man Man.

In the same year, Baek auditioned to become a trainee during JYP Entertainment's first open audition and won second place behind 2PM's Jang Wooyoung. According to Baek, she would go to school during weekdays, and travel from Daejeon to Seoul on Friday nights where she would be practicing until Monday morning, and come back to Daejeon to attend her classes.

In 2010, while a trainee under JYP Entertainment, Baek moved to New York for two years where she spent her time practicing English, singing, and dancing. She had Johan Kim as a vocal coach during her trainee days. She would move back and forth Korea and the United States during her trainee days.

On September 27, 2012, it was revealed that Baek will debut as part of a duo along with K-pop Star season 1 winner Park Ji-min called 15&. On October 7, 15& debuted with their first single, "I Dream", on SBS's Inkigayo.

=== 2015–2019: Solo success and departure from JYP ===
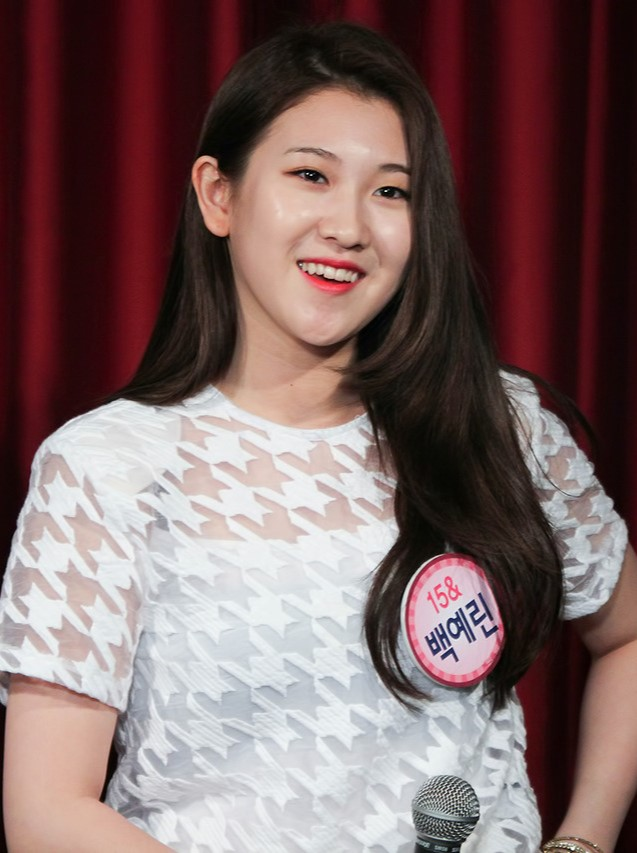
Baek in 2014

Following 15&'s four-year hiatus in February 2015, Baek was featured in a number of tracks. She was featured in South Korean rapper Olltii's single "Excited" from his debut album which topped the realtime charts upon release, and appeared in the final episode of the rap competition show Unpretty Rapstar, as a featured artist in contestant Yuk Ji-dam's song, "On & On". The song also went on to top the charts upon release. She was also featured on San E's single "Me You", and eventually topped the real-time charts of seven major music charts.

In November 2015, it was announced that Baek will postpone her college entrance examinations and will focus on her musical career. She officially debuted as a solo artist with her first extended play, Frank, with the lead single titled "Across the Universe" on the 30th. The EP marked the start of Baek's long-time collaboration with producer Cloud.

In February 2016, Baek graduated from Hanlim Multi Art School alongside 15& member Park Ji-min and Yugyeom of Got7.

Baek released her first digital single titled "Bye Bye My Blue" on June 20, 2016. Her follow-up digital single titled "Love You on Christmas" was released on December 7.

Baek continued to be featured on songs by popular artists, and began performing covers and her own unreleased songs at festivals. In 2017, Baek performed her then unreleased song "Square" at a festival in Han River while wearing a green dress, and the fan-taken video which was uploaded to YouTube instantly became a hot topic and continues to garner views. The song was eventually released two years later.

In 2018, she formed The Volunteers with members of the independent rock band Bye Bye Badman, and released their first EP, the post-grunge rock "Vanity & People". The Seoul-based rock band consists of vocalist and guitarist Baek, bassist Hyungseok Koh (Cloud), guitarist Jonny, and drummer Chiheon Kim. Like the majority of Baek's post-JYP solo work, The Volunteer's lyrics are written entirely in English.

Baek released her second EP, Our Love Is Great, on March 18, 2019. The following day, her title track "Maybe It's Not Our Fault" went to the top of all eight domestic music sites' realtime charts. At the 2020 Korean Music Awards, Our Love is Great and lead track "Maybe It's Not Our Fault" won Album of the Year, Best Pop Album, and Best Pop Song respectively.

Baek also contributed to the soundtrack of the popular 2019 K-drama Crash Landing on You, with an original ballad, "Here I am Again." The song peaked at #6 on Billboard's K-Pop Hot 100 chart, her highest position on the chart yet.

In 2019, Baek's duo 15& officially disbanded following Park Ji-min's departure from JYP Entertainment. On September 13, Baek announced that her contract with JYP Entertainment ended, and that she was leaving to create her own independent record label.

=== 2019–2021: Founding of label Blue Vinyl, Every Letter I Sent You and Tellusboutyourself ===
On November 6, 2019, Baek officially launched her own label, Blue Vinyl, and released her first studio and double-album through the label, Every Letter I Sent You the following month with 17 out of the 18 songs being written in English. Her single "Square (2017)" also made Baek the first South Korean artist to top the charts with a song sung entirely in English. The track achieved 'all kill' status, topping the daily and realtime charts of Melon, Genie, Bugs, and Soribada, and realtime charts of Flo and iChart.

At the 2020 Melon Music Awards, Baek was nominated for four of the major awards such as Artist of the Year, Song of the Year for "Square (2017)" and Album of the Year of Every Letter I Sent You, and was eventually awarded Top 10 Artist and Best R&B/Soul for her track "Square (2017)", and at the 2021 Korean Music Awards, Baek was awarded Best Pop Album for Every Letter I Sent You.

In February 2020, Baek embarked on her first solo concert, "Turn on that Blue Vinyl". Tickets for about 4,400 seats were sold out in 30 seconds.

On December 10, 2020, exactly one year after her previous album, Baek released her second studio album Tellusboutyourself. The album featured a wider range of musical genres and lyrical themes than her previous work. Her first remix, and third EP, Tellusboutyourself Remixes, featuring six remixed tracks from the album was released on February 16, 2021.

=== 2021–2024: The Volunteers, world tour, and departure from Blue Vinyl ===
On May 11, 2021, Baek's band, The Volunteers, joined her independent label, Blue Vinyl, and launched their self-titled debut album on May 27, after previously making their music solely available through SoundCloud and YouTube.

On September 10, 2021, Baek released her first cover and fourth EP, Love, Yerin, featuring six remake tracks from artists such as Nell and The Black Skirts. Following the release of the EP, all tracks entered the top ten charts of Melon, Bugs, and Genie.

On May 24, 2022, Baek released the digital single "Pisces".

On September 19, 2022, Baek announced her North American tour on Instagram which embarked in Atlanta on November 28, and concluded in Vancouver on December 22.

On January 1, 2023, Baek released the digital single "New Year". The following month, Baek followed up with her Asia-Pacific tour, announcing the tour dates on her Instagram with the tour starting with her three-day solo concert in Seoul, titled "Square", on May 19 to 21, 2023. Tickets were sold-out as soon as it opened with a waitlist of 40,000 units. The tour concluded in Bangkok on June 17, 2023.

On April 9, 2024, Baek announced her departure and termination of Blue Vinyl, her self-founded independent label, due to her expired contract alongside The Volunteers bandmates.

=== 2024–present: Independent label peoplelikepeople ===
On June 15, 2024, Baek signed a management contract with independent label peoplelikepeople.

On May 7, 2025, Baek released the digital single "I Met Peejay".

On October 2, 2025, Baek released her third studio album, Flash and Core. It is her first studio album in about five years following her second studio album Tellusboutyourself, with a total of 15 tracks.

== Artistry ==
=== Influences ===
Baek has cited Beyoncé, Amy Winehouse, Norah Jones, Rachel Yamagata, Oasis, Avril Lavigne, Rage Against the Machine, as well as Korean artists BoA, Light & Salt, Yoo Jae-ha and The Black Skirts as her influences. Additionally she covered The Black Skirts Song Antifreeze on her EP Love, Yerin. She titled her first EP, Frank, as a tribute to Winehouse, whose debut album share the same name. Baek also revealed through her live performances that she wrote the songs "Amy" and "True Lover" from her debut album dedicated to Winehouse.

=== Musical Style and Themes ===
Baek is known for her candid and straightforward lyrics. Upon debuting as a solo artist, Baek participated in writing and composing all of the songs on, Frank, revealing her singer-songwriter side. When writing songs for the EP, Baek wrote about her memories and current self. She would then eventually write the lyrics and compose the majority of her songs.

On her decision to write her songs in English, Baek explains her intentions to make her music accessible to international fans, her plans to have an international tour, and the influence of English-language artists who made an impact on her style and music. In a 2021 interview, Baek mentioned that it is her dream to perform in the home countries of the artists that inspired her.

On her lyrical inspiration for her second album, Tellusboutyourself, Baek cites the poetic metaphors of Blossom Dearie and the straightforward style of Amy Winehouse as influences.

Baek's range is from a minimum of 1 octave me (E3) to a maximum of 3 octaves ♭ (B♭5).

Video of Baek Yerin's range (1)

Video of Baek Yerin's range (2)

=== Voice and Vocals ===
Baek's voice is frequently characterized as having an ethereal, fragile, and subtly emotive tone, which is seen as a defining characteristic of her sound, particularly within the dream pop genre.

Technologically, her vocals demonstrate a mastery of soul and R&B techniques, frequently utilizing an effortless falsetto and subtle vocal runs to deliver emotional depth. Her use of breath control and whispers adds an intimate layer to her delivery.

Her diction, especially in her English tracks, has been noted by critics for its unique, sometimes indistinct quality. This specific vocal delivery often complements the lo-fi, dreamlike texture of her music, emphasizing atmosphere over linguistic clarity.

== Discography ==
- Every Letter I Sent You (2019)
- Tellusboutyourself (2020)
- Flash and Core (2025)

=== Songwriting credits ===
Songs of other artists written by Yerin Baek
Title	Artist	Year	Album	Notes
"Before I Knew It" (나도 모르게)	Yeonsoo	2017	Non-album single	Lyricist
"Still the One" (좋은 사람)	Soyou	2017	Re:Born	Lyricist
"From Now On"	Chungha	2018	Blooming Blue	Songwriter
"Smile" (미소)	Yeonsoo	2018	Non-album single	Lyricist
"Young in Love" (우리가 즐거워)	Chungha	2019	Flourishing	Songwriter
"All Night Long"	Chungha	2021	Querencia	Songwriter

=== Music videos ===
Music videos by Yerin Baek
Title	Year	Director(s)	Ref.
"Across the Universe" (우주를 건너)	2015	Unknown	—N/a
"That's Why"	2016	L5M.	
"Bye Bye My Blue"	2016	Kyle	
"Maybe It's Not Our Fault" (그건 아마 우리의 잘못은 아닐 거야)	2019	INSP (Koinrush)	
"Popo (How Deep Is Our Love?)"	2019	A Hobin Film	
"0310"	2019	A Hobin Film	
"0415"	2020	A Hobin Film	
"Hate You"	2020	A Hobin Film	
"I'll Be Your Family!"	2020	Tezo Don Lee (Tjoff Koong Studios London)	
"I'm in Love"	2020	A Hobin Film	
"You're So Lonely Now, So You Need Me Back by Your Side Again"	2020	Mareykrap	
"Pisces" (물고기)	2022	Ga (KeepUsWeird)	
"Fuckin' New Year"	2023	Hyeongjun Park (ambienceseoul)	
"Big World"	2023	Hyeongjun Park (ambienceseoul)	
"MIRROR"	2025	Hyeongjun Park (End of Opera)	

== Tours and concerts ==
=== Concert tours ===
==== "2022 Yerin Baek North America Tour" ====
Yerin Baek North America Tour (2022)
Date	City	Country	Venue
November 28, 2022	Atlanta, Georgia	United States	Center Stage
November 30, 2022	Houston, Texas	United States	Warehouse Live
December 1, 2022	Fort Worth, Texas	United States	Tulips
December 4, 2022	Santa Ana, California	United States	The Observatory
December 5, 2022	Los Angeles, California	United States	The Belasco
December 7, 2022	Berkeley, California	United States	The UC Theatre
December 9, 2022	Denver, Colorado	United States	Marquis Theatre
December 11, 2022	Chicago, Illinois	United States	Chop Shop
December 13, 2022	Toronto, Ontario	Canada	The Opera House
December 15, 2022	Boston, Massachusetts	United States	Crystal Ballroom
December 17, 2022	New York	United States	Irving Plaza
December 19, 2022	Silver Spring, Maryland	United States	The Fillmore Silver Spring
December 21, 2022	Seattle, Washington	United States	Neptune Theater
December 22, 2022	Vancouver, British Columbia	Canada	Hollywood Theater

==== "2023 Yerin Baek Asia-Pacific Tour" ====
Yerin Baek Asia-Pacific Tour (2023)
Date	City	Country	Venue
May 31, 2023	Jakarta	Indonesia	Balai Sarbini
June 2, 2023	Taipei	Taiwan	Legacy Taipei
June 5, 2023	Tokyo	Japan	Yebisu Garden Hall
June 7, 2023	Osaka	Japan	Umeda Club Quattro
June 9, 2023	Auckland	New Zealand	The Tuning Fork
June 11, 2023	Brisbane	Australia	The Triffid
June 13, 2023	Melbourne	Australia	170 Russell
June 15, 2023	Sydney	Australia	The Metro Theatre
June 17, 2023	Bangkok	Thailand	Royal Paragon Hall

=== One-off concerts ===
==== "Turn on that Blue Vinyl" ====
Yerin Baek 1st Concert "Turn on that Blue Vinyl" (2020)
Date	City	Country	Venue
February 8, 2020	Seoul	South Korea	Yes24 Live Hall
February 9, 2020	Seoul	South Korea	Yes24 Live Hall

==== "Square" ====
Yerin Baek Concert "Square" (2023)
Date	City	Country	Venue
May 19, 2023	Seoul	South Korea	SK Olympic Handball Gymnasium
May 20, 2023	Seoul	South Korea	SK Olympic Handball Gymnasium
May 21, 2023	Seoul	South Korea	SK Olympic Handball Gymnasium

==== "Flash and Core" ====
Yerin Baek 2025 Concert "Flash and Core" (2025)
Date	City	Country	Venue
October 25, 2025	Incheon	South Korea	Inspire Arena
October 26, 2025	Incheon	South Korea	Inspire Arena

==== "wanna see you dance again" ====
Yerin Baek 2025 Live "wanna see you dance again" (2025)
Date	City	Country	Venue
November 20, 2025	Seoul	South Korea	SFACTORY Seongsu
November 21, 2025	Seoul	South Korea	SFACTORY Seongsu
November 22, 2025	Seoul	South Korea	SFACTORY Seongsu
November 23, 2025	Seoul	South Korea	SFACTORY Seongsu

== Ambassadorship ==
- 5th Seoul Animal Film Festival (2022)

== Awards and nominations ==
Name of the award ceremony, year presented, award category, nominee(s) of the award, and the result of the nomination
Award ceremony	Year	Category	Nominee(s)/work(s)	Result	Ref.
Asia Artist Awards	2021	Female Solo Singer Popularity Award	Baek Ye-rin	Nominated	
Brand Customer Loyalty Awards	2021	Best Female Vocalist	Baek Ye-rin	Nominated	
Gaon Chart Music Awards	2017	Artist of the Year – Digital Music (June 2016)	"Bye Bye My Blue"	Nominated	
Gaon Chart Music Awards	2020	Artist of the Year – Digital Music (March 2019)	"Maybe It's Not Our Fault"	Nominated	
Gaon Chart Music Awards	2021	Artist of the Year – Digital Music (December 2019)	"Square (2017)"	Nominated	
Genie Music Awards	2019	Best Female Artist	Baek Ye-rin	Nominated	
Golden Disc Awards	2021	Digital Bonsang	"Square (2017)"	Nominated	
Korean Hip-hop Awards	2020	R&B Album of the Year	Every letter I sent you.	Nominated	
Korean Hip-hop Awards	2021	R&B Album of the Year	tellusboutyourself	Nominated	
Korean Music Awards	2020	Musician of the Year	Baek Ye-rin	Nominated	
Korean Music Awards	2020	Album of the Year	Our Love is Great	Won	
Korean Music Awards	2020	Best Pop Album	Our Love is Great	Won	
Korean Music Awards	2020	Song of the Year	"Maybe It's Not Our Fault"	Nominated	
Korean Music Awards	2020	Best Pop Song	"Maybe It's Not Our Fault"	Won	
Korean Music Awards	2021	Musician of the Year	Baek Ye-rin	Nominated	
Korean Music Awards	2021	Album of the Year	Every letter I sent you.	Nominated	
Korean Music Awards	2021	Best Pop Album	Every letter I sent you.	Won	
Korean Music Awards	2021	Song of the Year	"Square (2017)"	Nominated	
Korean Music Awards	2021	Best Pop Song	"Square (2017)"	Nominated	
Melon Music Awards	2019	Top 10 Artists	Baek Ye-rin	Nominated	
Melon Music Awards	2019	Best R&B/Soul	"Maybe It's Not Our Fault"	Nominated	
Melon Music Awards	2020	Artist of the Year	Baek Ye-rin	Nominated	
Melon Music Awards	2020	Album of the Year	Every letter I sent you.	Nominated	
Melon Music Awards	2020	Top 10 Artists	Baek Ye-rin	Won	
Melon Music Awards	2020	Best R&B/Soul	"Square (2017)"	Won	
Melon Music Awards	2021	Album of the Year	Tellusboutyourself	Nominated	
Melon Music Awards	2021	Top 10 Artists	Baek Ye-rin	Nominated	
Mnet Asian Music Awards	2016	Best Vocal Performance – Female Solo	"Across the Universe"	Nominated	
Mnet Asian Music Awards	2020	Best Vocal Performance – Solo	"Square (2017)"	Nominated	
Mnet Asian Music Awards	2020	Best OST	"Here I Am Again"	Nominated	
Seoul Music Awards	2016	Bonsang Award	Frank	Nominated	
Seoul Music Awards	2017	Bonsang Award	Bye Bye My Blue	Nominated	
Seoul Music Awards	2020	Bonsang Award	Our Love is Great	Nominated	
Seoul Music Awards	2020	Ballad Award	"Maybe It's Not Our Fault"	Nominated	
Seoul Music Awards	2021	OST Award	"Here I Am Again"	Nominated	
