= Na (EP) =

2024 extended play by Nayeon

- Digital cover

EP by Nayeon
- Released: June 14, 2024
- Studio: JYP Studios
- Length: 22:27
- Languages: Korean; English
- Labels: JYP; Republic

Nayeon chronology
Im Nayeon (2022)	Na (2024)	Na-sty (2026)

Singles from Na
- 1. "ABCD" Released: June 14, 2024

Professional ratings
Review scores
Source	Rating
Beats Per Minute	84/100

Na is the second extended play by South Korean singer Nayeon of the girl group Twice, released through JYP Entertainment and Republic Records on June 14, 2024. The EP contains seven tracks, including the lead single "ABCD" and collaborations with singers Sam Kim and Julie from Kiss of Life. It aims to showcase a stronger and more mature side of the singer, incorporating hip hop and dance elements.

== Background and release ==
Nayeon launched her solo career with her first EP, Im Nayeon, in June 2022. The EP peaked at number seven on the Billboard 200. Its lead single, "Pop!", became "a summer hit" on domestic streaming charts, including the Circle Digital Chart, where it peaked at number two. On April 9, 2024, South Korean news outlet Xsports News reported that Nayeon was preparing for a new release in June. JYP Entertainment responded that no release date had been decided yet. Subsequently, on May 13, it was announced that her new release would be released on June 14, 2024, with the release of a logo motion at midnight alongside a poster containing the phrase "How to Fall in Love with Na". Following the announcement, the company released a series of concept images from May 20 to 30, 2024.

On May 24, JYP released a teaser for her solo lead single "ABCD", released with the EP Na. The teaser featured a spoiler of the track, which is a hip hop-influenced pop dance track with the opening line, "Hey listen to me now". The lyrics, written by Rick Bridges and Park Jin-young, use the alphabet creatively to convey a message about teaching and tempting a love interest. The song was composed and arranged by Pdogg.

== Conception and title ==
On May 24, 2024, as her magazine feature, Nayeon appeared in a Cosmopolitan pictorial with a "fresh summer vibe." In her interview, she highlighted her second record, Na, noting it shows a stronger and more mature side, with hip-hop and sporty elements. She explained, "If the first album contained the image that many people think of me when they see me, I wanted to show a different side of me in the second album. You can expect a strong and mature appearance, whether in performance or vocals. It has a hip-hop feel, and also a sporty yet sexy feel. It was another challenge because it was a dance style that Twice had never done before." The album title represents Nayeon's 'I' (na 나 means "I" in Korean) and conveys the message "Me! Only me!", in contrast to her first EP, Im Nayeon, which highlighted "I am Nayeon" with a near-identical spelling of the artist's last name. This album boldly emphasizes Nayeon's determination to reveal only her authentic self.

== Track listing ==
Na track listing
No.	Title	Lyrics	Music	Arrangement	Length
1.	"ABCD"	Rick Bridges; J.Y. Park	Pdogg; Ghstloop; Aron Bergerwall; Louise Lindberg; Shorelle	Ghstloop; Pdogg; Aron Wyme; Evan	2:42
2.	"Butterflies"	Rachel West; Barry Cohen	Rachel West; Barry Cohen	Gingerbread	3:41
3.	"Heaven" (duet with Sam Kim)	Johan Fransson; Henrik Goranson; Lily Leilani Meola; Sam Fischer; Sam Kim	Johan Fransson; Henrik Goranson; Lily Leilani Meola; Sam Fischer; Sam Kim	Johan Fransson; Henrik Goranson	3:06
4.	"Magic" (featuring Julie of Kiss of Life)	Charli Taft; Daniel "Obi" Klein	Charli Taft; Daniel "Obi" Klein	Daniel "Obi" Klein	3:26
5.	"HalliGalli"	Lee Chan-hyuk	Lee Chan-hyuk; LP	LP	3:07
6.	"Something"	Jinli (Full8loom)	Sam Klempner; Blvsh; Sandra Wikström	Sam Klempner	3:07
7.	"Count It"	Sole	Sofia Kay; Aaron Theodore Berton; Matthew Crawford	Theo & The Climb	3:14
Total length:					22:27

== Charts ==
=== Weekly charts ===
Weekly chart performance for Na
Chart (2024)	Peak position
Austrian Albums (Ö3 Austria)	48
Belgian Albums (Ultratop Flanders)	147
Belgian Albums (Ultratop Wallonia)	89
Croatian International Albums (HDU)	5
French Albums (SNEP)	29
German Albums (Offizielle Top 100)	50
Japanese Albums (Oricon)	4
Japanese Combined Albums (Oricon)	3
Japanese Hot Albums (Billboard Japan)	21
South Korean Albums (Circle)	1
Spanish Albums (Promusicae)	53
Swedish Physical Albums (Sverigetopplistan)	19
Swiss Albums (Schweizer Hitparade)	64
UK Album Downloads (Official Charts)	81
UK Physical Singles (OCC)	1
UK Singles Sales (OCC)	11
US Billboard 200	7
US World Albums (Billboard)	1

=== Monthly charts ===
Monthly chart performance for Na
Chart (2024)	Position
Japanese Albums (Oricon)	32
South Korean Albums (Circle)	5

=== Year-end charts ===
Year-end chart performance for Na
Chart (2024)	Position
South Korean Albums (Circle)	54

== Certifications ==
Certifications for Na
Region	Certification	Certified units/sales
South Korea (KMCA)	Platinum	250,000^{^}
^{^} Shipments figures based on certification alone.

== Release history ==
Release dates and formats for Na
Region	Date	Format	Label	Ref.
Various	June 14, 2024	CD; digital download; streaming; vinyl	JYP; Republic	
South Korea	June 14, 2024	Nemo	JYP	

== See also ==
- List of Circle Album Chart number ones of 2024
- List of K-pop albums on the Billboard charts
