= Bernard Park =

South Korean singer (born 1993)

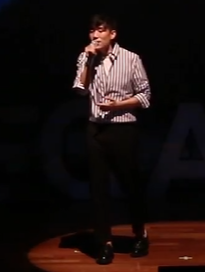
- Park in August 2018
- Born: Bernard Park; January 29, 1993 (age 33); Chicago, Illinois, U.S.
- Other name: Park Nak-joon
- Citizenship: United States (renounced), South Korea
- Musical career
- Genres: K-pop; R&B; soul; acoustic
- Occupation: Singer
- Years active: 2013–present
- Label: JYP
- Website: bernardpark.jype.com

Korean name
- Hangul: 박낙준
- RR: Bak Nakjun
- MR: Pak Nakchun

Bernard Park (born January 29, 1993), also known as Nakjoon, is an American singer based in South Korea. He is best known as the winning contestant of K-pop Star Season 3. He made his official debut on October 13, 2014 with his first extended play I'm.

== Early life ==
Bernard Park, also known by his Korean name Park Nak-joon (박낙준), was born in Chicago, Illinois, and lived there for ten years before moving to Atlanta, Georgia. He is the youngest son of Park Sang-wook, who runs a laundromat in Marietta. After graduating from North Gwinnett High School, Park was studying at Gwinnett College and working part-time at a restaurant near Duluth, when he took a leave of absence and moved to South Korea to compete in the reality competition show K-pop Star.

== Career ==
Bernard Park first gained recognition in South Korea by winning K-pop Star Season 3 in its final episode which aired on April 13, 2014, beating out fellow Korean-American singer Sam Kim. He chose to sign a contract with JYP Entertainment in preparation for his official debut in the music industry. Six months later, Park made his official debut with the release of his first EP, I'm..., on October 13, with the album debuting at its peak position of number 9 on the Gaon Album Chart. The album was supported by the pre-release track of the same name, "I'm" (난), which was a reinterpretation of a song earlier released by Park Jin-young in 1997.

On August 9, 2014, Park participated in the JYP Nation concert "One Mic" which was held at the Jamsil Indoor Gymnasium in Seoul. He performed the song "The Last Time", before collaborating with Miss A member Suzy for the song "Farewell Under the Sun" (대낮에 한 이별). The latter song eventually became the title track for the live concert album which was released on December 10.

On October 15, 2014, Park held his first solo concert titled "Bernard Park's Fall Music Appreciation Concert" at the JBK Convention Hall in Samseong-dong. The following month, Park participated at J.Y.Park's "42 No. 1" 20th Anniversary concert at the Milk Music Live Station, which was held on November 8 at the Olympic Hall located in the Olympic Park, Seoul. Then on December 28, Park performed at the 6th Philippine K-pop Convention held at the SMX Convention Center in Pasay, appearing alongside Sistar and labelmates Got7.

Park then collaborated with labelmates Park Jimin and J.Y.Park with the release of the song "Busan Memories" (부산에 가면) on September 22, 2015. The song reached its peak position of 99 on the Gaon Digital Chart.

On April 4, 2016, Park released the digital single titled "With You" (니가 보인다), which was a duet with Wonder Girls member Hyerim. The song reached a peak position of number 53 on the Gaon Digital Chart. On July 6, Park released the song "Dirt" (먼지) in his first soundtrack participation for the drama A Beautiful Mind.

On June 21, 2017, Park announced that he would be promoting himself in his future activities with his Korean name, Nakjoon, in conjunction with the first reveal of his new song "Blame" featuring rapper Changmo. The song was released as a maxi single on June 28, supported by the B-sides "Your Story" and "Marry Me".

Park then participated in the soundtrack album for the drama Radio Romance with the release of the song "The Covered Up Road" (가리워진 길), which was released on February 5, 2018. On October 10, he collaborated with former f(x) member Luna for his digital single titled "Still". The single was supported with the pre-release track "Sleep Mode", which was released in both Korean and English on October 7 and was written by labelmate Young K of Day6.

On December 7, it was first announced that Park would be enlisting for mandatory military service as an active duty soldier, having given up his US citizenship in order to do so. He later held a mini-fan meeting titled 'Starry Night' to deliver a performance for his fans before undergoing his enlistment. On December 17, he entered the 22nd Division of the ROK Army where he began basic military training and continued active service in the division's military band. Park formally finished his military service on July 27, 2020.

Park made his first onstage performance and media appearance after enlistment with an appearance on MBC's King of Mask Singer in its episode which aired on August 30, 2020.

On October 7, Park announced that he would go back to using 'Bernard Park' for future promotions. In the same month, he participated in the soundtrack album for the JTBC drama More Than Friends with the release of the song "Close Your Eyes", marking his first song after his military enlistment, as well as the return of his birth name for promotions.

On November 15, 2021, Park released a new digital single titled "Bad Influence".

On September 19, 2022, JYP Entertainment announced his departure from the label after deciding not to renew his contract.

== Discography ==
=== Extended plays ===
Title	Album details	Peak chart positions	Sales
Title	Album details	KOR	Sales
I'm…	Released: October 13, 2014; Label: JYP Entertainment; Format: CD, digital download; Track listing: 1. "I'm" (난); 2. "Before the Rain"; 3. "A Woman like You" (너 같은 여잘); 4. "One More Day" (하루만 더); 5. "To Be Honest" (솔직히 말해서); 6. "Even If I Become a Singer" (가수가 돼도)	9	KOR: 2,750
To Whom It May Concern	Released: September 6, 2022; Label: JYP Entertainment; Format: CD, digital download; Track listing: 1. "All Day" (하루종일 부르지); 2. "Friend Zone"; 3. "Happy" (행복한 사람); 4. "Crossroad"; 5. "Giving Tree"	—	—

=== Singles ===
Title	Year	Peak chart positions	Sales	Album
Title	Year	KOR	Sales	Album
"I'm" (난)	2014	32	KOR: 69,628	I'm...
"Before the Rain"	2014	68	KOR: 28,943	I'm...
"Farewell Under the Sun" (대낮에 한 이별) (with Suzy)	2014	40	KOR: 92,093	JYP Nation Korea 2014 'One Mic'
"Busan Memories" (부산에 가면) (with J.Y. Park and Park Ji-min)	2015	99	KOR: 24,900	Non-album singles
"With You" (니가 보인다) (with Hyerim)	2016	53	KOR: 38,255	Non-album singles
"Blame" (featuring Changmo)	2017	—	—N/a	Non-album singles
"Still" (featuring Luna)	2018	—	—N/a	Non-album singles
"Bad Influence"	2021	—	—N/a	Non-album singles
"All Day" (하루종일 부르지)	2022	—	—N/a	To Whom It May Concern

=== Soundtrack appearances ===
Title	Year	Peak chart positions	Sales	Album
Title	Year	KOR	Sales	Album
"Dirt" (먼지)	2016	—	—N/a	A Beautiful Mind OST
"The Covered Up Road" (가리워진 길)	2018	—	—N/a	Radio Romance OST
"Close Your Eyes"	2020	—	—N/a	More Than Friends OST
"I fell in love" (아이 펠 인 러브)	2023	—	—N/a	Three Bold Siblings OST

=== Other charted songs ===
Title	Year	Peak chart positions	Sales	Album
Title	Year	KOR	Sales	Album
"What I Want To Say" (하고 싶은 말)	2014	99	KOR: 18,207	K-pop Star Season 3 Top 10 Part 1
"Home"	2014	35	KOR: 35,461	K-pop Star Season 3 Top 8
"Right Here Waiting"	2014	35	KOR: 121,317	K-pop Star Season 3 Special Track
"I Believe I Can Fly"	2014	96	KOR: 14,153	K-pop Star Season 3 Top (Bernard Park)
"Because I Love" (사랑하기 때문에)	2014	27	KOR: 67,759	K-pop Star Season 3 Top (Bernard Park)

== Filmography ==
=== Reality show ===
- K-pop Star Season 3 (2013–2014)

=== Variety show ===
- King of Mask Singer (2020)
- Artistak Game - player (2022)

== Awards and nominations ==
Year	Award	Category	Nominated work	Result
2014	K-pop Star 3	1st Place (Winner)	—N/a	Won
2015	29th Golden Disc Awards	Best New Artist	—N/a	Nominated
2015	24th Seoul Music Awards	Bonsang Award	"Before the Rain"	Nominated
2015	24th Seoul Music Awards	Popularity Award	"Before the Rain"	Nominated
2015	24th Seoul Music Awards	Rookie Award	"Before the Rain"	Nominated
2015	24th Seoul Music Awards	Hallyu Special Award	"Before the Rain"	Nominated
2015	The 6th Philippine Kpop Awards	Rookie of the Year	—N/a	Nominated

== Concerts and tours ==
=== Special Concert ===
- Bernard Park's Fall Music Appreciation (2014)

=== JYP Nation ===
- JYP Nation One Mic in Seoul (2014)
- JYP Nation One Mic in Bangkok (2014)

=== Concert Participation ===
- MILK Music Like Station (Concert for JYP's 20th Years Debut) (2014)
- KPOP Convention 6 in the Philippines (2014)
- GOT7 1st Fan Party in Bangkok ft. Bernard Park (2015)
