= I Am Sam (disambiguation) =

I Am Sam is a 2001 film.

I Am Sam may also refer to:

- I Am Sam (soundtrack), a soundtrack album from the film
- I Am Sam (TV series), a South Korean television series
- I Am Sam (EP), an EP by Sam Kim
