= List of Circle Album Chart number ones of 2024 =

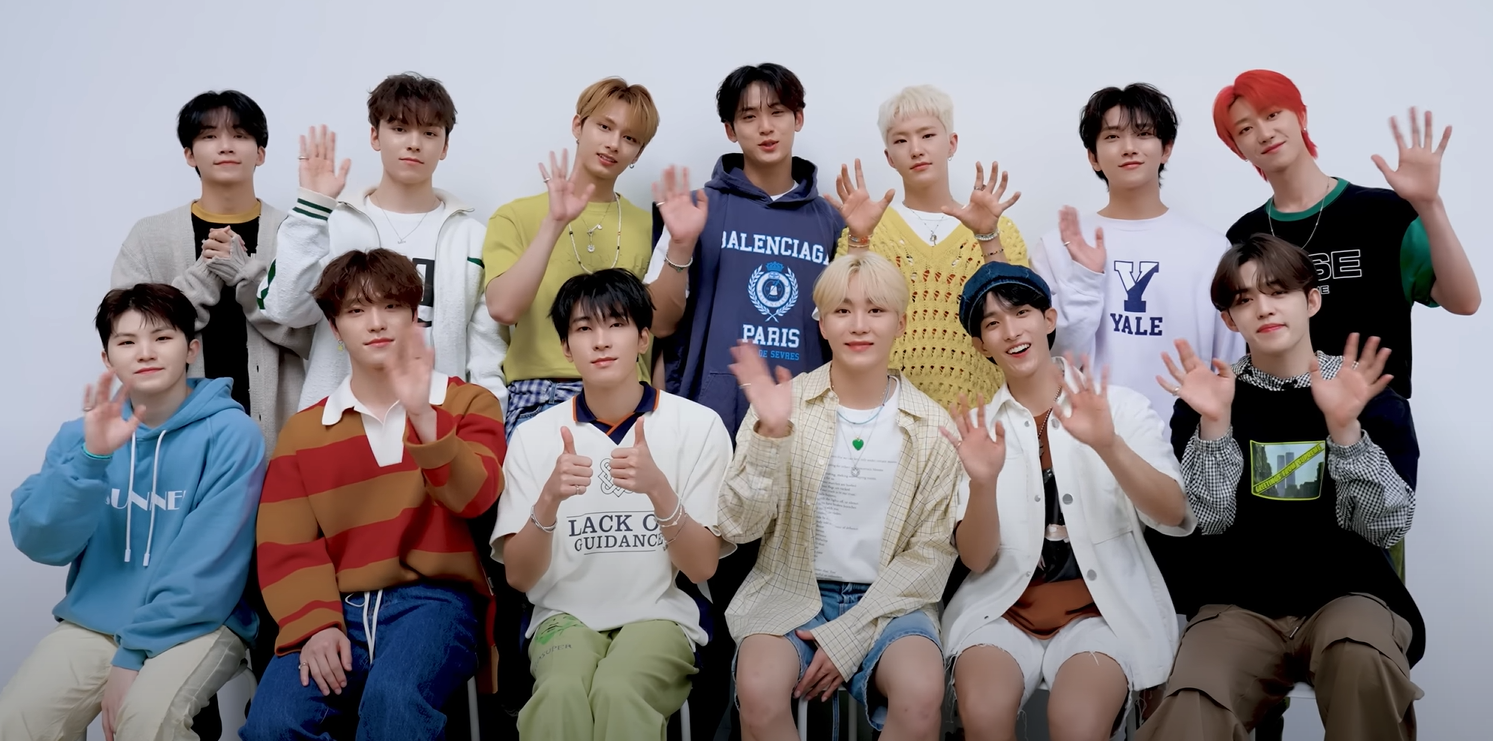
South Korean boy band Seventeen had the two best-selling albums of the year. Their sixteenth extended play, Spill the Feels, sold 3.18 million physical copies, while the compilation album 17 Is Right Here achieved the highest first-week sales, with 2.79 million copies sold. The compilation album finished second on the year-end list, with 3.15 million copies sold.

The Circle Album Chart is a South Korean record chart that ranks the best-selling albums and EPs in South Korea. It is part of the Circle Chart, which launched in February 2010 as the Gaon Chart. The data is compiled by the Ministry of Culture, Sports and Tourism and the Korea Music Content Industry Association based upon weekly/monthly physical album sales by major South Korean distributors such as Kakao Entertainment, YG Plus, Sony Music Korea, Warner Music Korea, Universal Music and Dreamus.

== Weekly charts ==
Key
†	Indicates best-selling album of 2024

List of number-one albums on the weekly Circle Album Chart in 2024
Week ending date	Album	Artist	Weekly sales	Ref.
January 6	Be There for Me	NCT 127	131,270	
January 13	Born to Be	Itzy	487,655	
January 20	Fe3O4: Break	Nmixx	703,495	
January 27	Sparkling Blue	TWS	237,606	
February 3	2	(G)I-dle	860,788	
February 10	Killin' It	P1Harmony	148,136	
February 17	Happy &	N.SSign	203,820	
February 24	Easy	Le Sserafim	977,946	
March 2	Asterum: 134-1	Plave	394,220	
March 9	Wish	NCT Wish	244,157	
March 16	Voyage	Tempest	114,888	
March 23	Phantasy Pt. 3: Love Letter	The Boyz	253,016	
March 30	Dream()scape	NCT Dream	1,821,041	
April 6	Minisode 3: Tomorrow	Tomorrow X Together	1,542,718	
April 13	Youth Chapter 1: Youth Days	Epex	178,537	
April 20	How?	BoyNextDoor	566,083	
April 27	Bright; 燦	Lee Chan-won	601,213	
May 4	17 Is Right Here	Seventeen	2,792,406	
May 11	17 Is Right Here	Seventeen	206,947	
May 18	You Had Me at Hello	Zerobaseone	902,638	
May 25	How Sweet	NewJeans	826,802	
June 1	Golden Hour: Part.1	Ateez	1,140,270	
June 8	Give Me That	WayV	300,719	
June 15	Na	Nayeon	390,799	
June 22	Supernatural	NewJeans	832,656	
June 29	Summer Beat!	TWS	489,200	
July 6	Songbird	NCT Wish	348,222	
July 13	Romance: Untold	Enhypen	1,841,054	
July 20	Ate	Stray Kids	2,654,572	
July 27	Romance: Untold	Enhypen	193,310	
August 3	Romance: Untold	Enhypen	147,728	
August 10	Ate	Stray Kids	94,238	
August 17	Supersonic	Fromis 9	92,522	
August 24	Fe3O4: Stick Out	Nmixx	577,997	
August 31	Cinema Paradise	Zerobaseone	1,086,861	
September 7	Hello, World	Baekhyun	765,312	
September 14	19.99	BoyNextDoor	752,084	
September 21	Riizing: Epilogue	Riize	203,760	
September 28	Steady	NCT Wish	329,726	
October 5	Walk	NCT 127	84,582	
October 12	Cinema Paradise	Zerobaseone	51,417	
October 19	Spill the Feels †	Seventeen	2,674,583	
October 26	Whiplash	Aespa	841,757	
November 2	Drip	Babymonster	444,674	
November 9	The Star Chapter: Sanctuary	Tomorrow X Together	1,522,379	
November 16	Romance: Untold -Daydream-	Enhypen	1,126,568	
November 23	Golden Hour: Part.2	Ateez	677,153	
November 30	Last Bell	TWS	430,099	
December 7	Strategy	Twice	819,887	
December 14	Hop	Stray Kids	1,853,071	
December 21	Hop	Stray Kids	159,885	
December 28	Like a Flower	Irene	34,874	

== Monthly charts ==
List of number-one albums on the monthly Circle Album Chart in 2024
Month	Album	Artist	Sales	Ref.
January	2	(G)I-dle	815,288	
February	With You-th	Twice	1,086,571	
March	Dream()scape	NCT Dream	1,836,475	
April	17 Is Right Here	Seventeen	2,763,981	
May	Golden Hour: Part.1	Ateez	1,140,270	
June	Riizing	Riize	962,509	
July	Ate	Stray Kids	2,723,327	
August	Cinema Paradise	Zerobaseone	1,086,861	
September	Hello, World	Baekhyun	1,183,786	
October	Spill the Feels	Seventeen	3,076,910	
November	The Star Chapter: Sanctuary	Tomorrow X Together	1,663,159	
December	Hop	Stray Kids	2,041,231	
