= ABCD (song) =

2024 song by Nayeon

Single by Nayeon

from the EP Na
- Language: Korean
- Released: June 14, 2024
- Recorded: April 30, 2024
- Genre: Dance-pop; hip hop
- Length: 2:43
- Label: JYP; Republic
- Composers: Pdogg; Ghstloop; Aron Bergerwall; Louise Lindberg; Shorelle
- Lyricists: Rick Bridges; J.Y. Park "The Asiansoul"
- Producers: Ghstloop; Pdogg; Bergerwall; Evan

Nayeon singles chronology
| "Pop!" (2022) | "ABCD" (2024) |

Music video
- "ABCD" on YouTube

"ABCD'" is a song recorded by South Korean singer Nayeon for her second extended play, Na. It was released by JYP Entertainment as the EP's lead single on June 14, 2024.

== Background and release ==
On May 13, 2024, JYP Entertainment announced that Nayeon would be releasing her second extended play titled Na on June 14. The promotional schedule was also released on the same day. Three days later, the track listing was released with "ABCD" announced as the lead single. On May 24, a snippet of the song was released. On June 7, the highlight medley teaser video was released. On June 10, the first music video teaser was released, followed by the second music video teaser two days later. The song was released alongside its music video and the extended play on June 14.

== Composition ==
"ABCD" was written by Rick Bridges and J.Y. Park "The Asiansoul", composed and arranged by Pdogg, Ghstloop, and Aron Bergerwall with Louise Lindberg and Shorelle participating in the composition, and Evan participating in the arrangement. It was described as a dance-pop and hip hop song with "early 2000s pop diva vibes" and containing the message of "teaching and tempting the person who is my type from A to Z about love from beginning to end". In terms of musical notation, it was composed in the key of E-flat minor, with a tempo of 106 beats per minute.

== Music video ==
The music video directed by Guzza of Kudo was released alongside the song by JYP Entertainment on June 14. The visual depicts "Nayeon walking down a busy street after a car crash [with] drivers and onlookers captivated by her as she moves through different time periods and set locations". Throughout the video, the singer dances with "effortless charisma showcasing her captivating presence with every move".

== Promotion ==
Prior to the release of Na, on June 13, 2024, Nayeon held a live offline event aimed at introducing the extended play and its tracks, including "ABCD", and connecting with her fanbase. She subsequently performed on three music programs: KBS's Music Bank on June 14, MBC's Show! Music Core on June 15, and SBS's Inkigayo on June 16. She also performed at the Waterbomb festival in Seoul on July 7.

== Accolades ==
On South Korean music programs, "ABCD" achieved first place wins on the June 19 episode of Show Champion, and June 21 episode of Music Bank.

== Track listing ==
- Digital download and streaming – digital EP
1. "ABCD" (original version) – 2:42
2. "ABCD" (extended version) – 3:20
3. "ABCD" (original version; instrumental) – 2:42
4. "ABCD" (extended version; instrumental) – 3:20

== Credits and personnel ==
Credits adapted from liner notes of Na.

Studio

- JYPE Studios – recording, mixing (vinyl version only)
- Henson Studios – mixing
- Glab Studios – mixing
- 821 Sound Mastering – mastering

Personnel

- Nayeon – vocals
- Jinli (Full8loom) – background vocals
- Rick Bridges – lyrics
- J.Y. Park "The Asiansoul" – lyrics
- Pdogg – composition, arrangement, recording, digital editing, vocal arrangement, vocal directing, keyboard, synthesizer
- Ghstloop – composition, arrangement, digital editing, keyboard, synthesizer
- Aron Bergerwall – composition, arrangement, guitar, keyboard, synthesizer
- Louise Lindberg – composition
- Shorelle – composition
- Evan – arrangement
- Seo Eun-il – recording
- Josh Gudwin – mixing
- Felix Byrne – mixing (assistant)
- Lee Tae-seop – mixing (vinyl version only)
- Shin Bong-won – mixing
- Park Nam-joon – mixing (assistant)
- Kwon Nam-woo – mastering
- Nugi – bass

== Charts ==
=== Weekly charts ===
Weekly chart performance for "ABCD"
| Chart (2024) | Peak position |
|---|---|
| Global 200 (Billboard) | 54 |
| Hong Kong (Billboard) | 17 |
| Japan (Japan Hot 100) | 25 |
| Japan Combined Singles (Oricon) | 29 |
| Malaysia (Billboard) | 23 |
| Malaysia International (RIM) | 16 |
| New Zealand Hot Singles (RMNZ) | 17 |
| Philippines (Philippines Hot 100) | 73 |
| Singapore (RIAS) | 12 |
| South Korea (Circle) | 95 |
| Taiwan (Billboard) | 9 |
| UK Singles Downloads (Official Charts) | 36 |
| UK Singles Sales (OCC) | 42 |
| US World Digital Song Sales (Billboard) | 2 |

=== Monthly charts ===
Monthly chart performance for "ABCD"
| Chart (2024) | Position |
|---|---|
| South Korea (Circle) | 109 |

== Release history ==
Release history for "ABCD"
| Region | Date | Format | Version | Label |
|---|---|---|---|---|
| Various | June 14, 2024 | Digital download; streaming | Original | JYP; Republic |
| Various | June 24, 2024 | Digital download; streaming | Digital EP | JYP; Republic |

== See also ==
- List of Music Bank Chart winners (2024)
- List of Show Champion Chart winners (2024)
