= Im Nayeon (EP) =

2022 extended play by Nayeon

- Digital cover

EP by Nayeon
- Released: June 24, 2022
- Studio: JYP Studios
- Genres: Pop; R&B
- Length: 21:44
- Languages: Korean; English
- Labels: JYP; Republic

Nayeon chronology
| Im Nayeon (2022) | Na (2024) |

Singles from Im Nayeon
- 1. "Pop!" Released: June 24, 2022

Im Nayeon (/aɪm nɑːjʌn/ eye-m na-yun) is the debut extended play (EP) by South Korean singer Nayeon of the girl group Twice. It was released through JYP Entertainment and Republic Records on June 24, 2022. The EP contains seven tracks, including the lead single "Pop!" and collaborations with Felix from Stray Kids and Wonstein. The EP is primarily a pop record that blends genres such as R&B, dance, disco, jazz, and ballads. The album's themes revolve around self-confidence, overcoming hardships, struggling with inner anxieties, love, and sad breakups.

Im Nayeon was met with generally favorable reviews from critics, who praised its fun and catchy production and its way of blending various genres with pop music. Commercially, the EP debuted at number one on the Circle Album Chart. In the United States, it became the first album by a South Korean soloist to reach top ten on the Billboard 200 with over 52,000 pure physical sales. Additionally, the EP was certified 2× Platinum by the Korea Music Content Association (KMCA) for selling over 500,000 physical copies.

== Background ==
On May 19, 2022, it was announced via Twice's social media pages that Nayeon would release her first extended play, titled Im Nayeon, on June 24. It was accompanied by a teaser image featuring a close-up shot of what appears to be a coffee table, with trinkets such as bottles of nail polish, jewellery and a cup of tea strewn across. Specifics about Im Nayeon and its impending release were also unveiled in the following weeks, with worldwide pre-orders for the EP starting on May 24.

== Title and composition ==
The album's title, Im Nayeon, is a play on the near-identical spelling of the artist's last name and the contraction "I'm". It is twenty-one minutes long and consists of seven songs. The EP features two guest appearances from Felix of Stray Kids and the South Korea rapper Wonstein. It features genres such as R&B, dance, disco, jazz, and ballads. Nayeon worked with many notable names, including, Jade Thirlwall, Kenzie, LDN Noise, The Stereotypes, and American singer-songwriter Destiny Rogers. The first half of the EP is described as "wonderfully luminescent and colourful," that revolves around more upbeat production, such as dance and disco-pop sounds, with lyrics talking about confidence, " glowing happiness in newfound romance," and pursuing one's own feelings, while the second half is more mature, chill, and gentle, focusing more on R&B, jazzy, and ballad production, with lyrics that deal with inner anxieties while being in a relationship, worries, stress and, a state after a breakup.

=== Songs ===
The record opens with the lead single, "Pop!" which described as a song that "conjures classic Twice" It is a pop and bubblegum song that takes inspiration from the sounds of second-generation bubblegum K-pop. Characterized by bright beats, live instruments such as bass, guitar, and horn, winding high notes, and a variety of ad libs. Its lyrics revolve around "a bold declaration of confidence." Where the protagonist sings about her ability to capture her lover's heart with ease. The lyrics "explored the flirtatious and accrescent sentiments of romance using onomatopoeia to portray popping a lover’s heart like a bubble." The second track "No Problem" is an English-language collab with Felix of Stray Kids. It is a disco-pop song, described as "a comforting song about the power of love." Followed with the second collaboration "Love Countdown" with the South Korean rapper Wonstein. It is an R&B and pop track that incorporate "summery" guitar riffs, synths and "a smooth tempo." Its lyrics revolve around "Nayeon waiting for someone to admit their feelings for her in a very coy fashion, urging the person to hurry as she’s already at the starting line, while Wonstein’s verse provides a great counterpart in showing the other side’s perspective in waiting for her to approach him. It’s a fun and playful track whose lesson is that hesitation won’t get you very far in pursuing your feelings." The fourth track "Candyfloss," was co-composed and produced by Jade Thirlwall of British girl group Little Mix. It is an 80s-Inspired pop track that features synths and saxophone. Some critics described it as "an extension of the typical Twice's image." Fifth track, “All Or Nothing," written by Nayeon. It is an R&B song that maintains a synth-y sound that is "minimal and chill compared to previous tracks." Nayeon wrote the track while on tour with Twice in the United States. It talks about all the things that helped her overcome hardships during the course of her life. Its lyrics shows Nayeon singing about getting into relationship "while combating inner anxieties." Followed with “Happy Birthday to You,” another R&B track, described as "lowkey and vibey," rather than "a bright, festive celebratory track." Lyrically, it's about "Nayeon sings to someone about how worries and stress are omnipresent but it’s okay to let things go once in a while. Although birthdays are frequently treated with cynicism, she refuses to let such days be anything but special." It's described as a "comforting reminder that, whether it’s your birthday or not, there’s nothing wrong with taking time for yourself." The closing track, “Sunset," is a chill and jazzy song that incorporates the production of strings, a gentle tempo, keyboards, and bass. Its lyrics revolve around Nayeon, who "takes solace in watching the sunset after a breakup."

== Critical reception ==
Professional ratings
Aggregate scores
| Source | Rating |
|---|---|
| Metacritic | 78/100 |
Review scores
| Source | Rating |
| AllMusic | 3.5/5 stars |
| Beats Per Minute | 79/100 |
| IZM | 3/5 stars |
| NME | 4/5 stars |
| Sputnikmusic | 4.1/5 |

On Metacritic, which assigns a normalized rating out of 100 to reviews from professional publications, Im Nayeon received a mean score of 78 based on 5 reviews, indicating "generally favorable reviews".

NME's Rhian Daly gives four stars out of five, highlighting its showcase of her pop brilliance and songwriting talent, despite staying close to Twice's sound. Standout tracks include 'Love Countdown' and 'All Or Nothing', though some, like 'Happy Birthday To You', feel lightweight. 'Pop' and 'Sunset' shine as the best tracks, demonstrating Nayeon's versatility. Overall, 'IM NAYEON' serves as a warm introduction to her solo career.

Beats Per Minute's JT Early, give it a 79% rating, praising its blend of bright pop and mature R&B. Standout tracks include "Pop," "No Problem" featuring Stray Kids' Felix, and "Love Countdown" featuring Wonstein. He note that despite a shift towards mature R&B, the album still maintained charm, marking a strong solo debut for Nayeon. JesperL from Sputnikmusic give it a four out of five. He describes it as a delightful 20 minutes of sugary catchiness, with catchy songs about sweet themes. He noted that despite a slight derailment from an "awkward" feature, the album maintains its charisma and leaves a lasting impression.

Uproxx including the album on their list of best pop album of 2022. Praising its way of blending pop production with various genres, writing, "IM NAYEON has set the standard for what’s to come and what to look out for with future solo projects from twice".

=== Year-end lists ===
Im Nayeon on year-end lists
| Critic/Publication | List | Rank | Ref. |
|---|---|---|---|
| Uproxx | The Best pop Albums of 2022 | —N/a | |
| Uproxx | The Best K-Pop Albums of 2022 | —N/a | |

== Commercial performance ==
Ahead of its release, the Im Nayeon surpassed over 500,000 pre-orders, the highest number of pre-orders by a female soloist thus far in 2022. The EP debuted and peaked at number 1 on the South Korean Gaon Album Chart. On the US Billboard 200, the EP peaked at number 7 with pure 52,000 copies sold, making Nayeon the first South Korean soloist to enter the top 10 and highest selling female act of the year upon its release. In Japan, it reached number 7 on the Japanese Digital Albums chart and number 19 on the Japanese Hot Albums chart. In Europe, it charted in Finland, Poland, and the United Kingdom.

In August 2022, the EP received a Platinum certification from the Korea Music Content Association (KMCA) for selling over 250,000 units in South Korea. It was later certified 2× Platinum in November 2022 for surpassing 500,000 units sold.

== Track listing ==
Im Nayeon track listing
| No. | Title | Lyrics | Music | Arrangement | Length |
|---|---|---|---|---|---|
| 1. | "Pop!" | Lee Seu-ran | Kenzie; Hayden Chapman; Greg Bonnick; Ellen Berg | LDN Noise | 2:48 |
| 2. | "No Problem" (featuring Felix of Stray Kids) | Lewis Shay Jankel | Jankel | Jankel | 3:16 |
| 3. | "Love Countdown" (featuring Wonstein) | Nayeon; Wonstein | Earattack; Ronnie Icon; Willemijn May; Eniac; 24E! | Earattack; Eniac | 3:17 |
| 4. | "Candyfloss" | Shim Eun-ji | Jade Thirlwall; Rick Parkhouse; George Tizzard | Red Triangle | 3:01 |
| 5. | "All or Nothing" | Nayeon | Destiny Rogers; Carmen Reece; Jonathan Yip; Ray Romulus; Jeremy Reeves; Ray Charles McCullough II | The Stereotypes | 3:04 |
| 6. | "Happy Birthday to You" | E.One | E.One | E.One | 3:05 |
| 7. | "Sunset" (노을만 예쁘다; Noeulman Yeppeuda; lit. '"Only the Sunset Is Pretty"') | Park Woo-sang | Park | Park | 3:13 |
| Total length: | | | | | 21:44 |

== Credits and personnel ==
Credits adapted from Melon.

Studios

- JYP Studios – recording (all tracks), mixing (track 2, 3)
- Chapel Swing Studios – mixing
- Sound360 – dolby atmos music mixing & mastering
- 821 Sound – mastering

Musician

- Nayeon – vocals (all track), background vocals (track 2), lyricist (track 3, 5)
- Sophia Pae — background vocals (track 1- 5)
- LDN Noise – all instruments (track 1)
- Eunji Shim – vocal director (track 1, 4)
- Felix – featured artist (track 2)
- Sam Carter – vocal director (track 2)
- Earattack – vocal director (track 2, 3, 5), all instruments (track 3), keyboard (track 3)
- Wonstein – featured artist, background vocals, vocal editing ( track 3)
- Eniac – all instrumental, keyboard (track 3)
- Kim Jong-seong – guitar (track 3)
- Hohyun Jung (e.one) – keyboard, vocal director (track 6)
- Eunjin Kwon – chorus (track 6)
- Park Woo-sang – vocal director (track 7)
- Young (Jeong Jae-pil) – guitar (track 7)
- Rb-Inj – string preferences (track 7)
- Kwon Seok-hong – string arrangement (track 7)
- Yoo-ra Lee – chorus (track 7)

Technical

- Eunji Shim – audio engineer (track 1, 4)
- Kyung-Won Lee – digital editing (track 2, 5)
- Hyejin Koo - recording (track 1, 2, 4, 6, 7)
- Tony Maserati – mixing (track 1)
- David K. Younghyun – mixing (track 1)
- Sangyeob Lee – recording (track 2)
- Taeseop Lee – mixing (track 2, 3, 6)
- Gyeongwon Lee, – digital editing (track 3)
- Byunghyun Hong – vocal editing (track 3)
- Sehee Um – recording (track 3, 5)
- Byunghyun Hong – recording (track 3)
- Hong-Jin Lim – mixing (track 4, 5)
- Park Woo-sang – mixing (track 7)
- Haneul Lee – Immersive mix engineer (all tracks)
- Jung-Hoon Choi – Immersive mix engineer (all tracks)
- Namwoo Kwon – mastering (all tracks)

== Charts ==
=== Weekly charts ===
Chart performance for Im Nayeon
| Chart (2022) | Peak position |
|---|---|
| Australian Digital Albums (ARIA) | 21 |
| Australian Hitseekers Albums (ARIA) | 2 |
| Canadian Albums (Billboard) | 54 |
| Finnish Albums (Suomen virallinen lista) | 25 |
| Japanese Albums (Oricon) | 6 |
| Japanese Digital Albums (Oricon) | 7 |
| Japanese Hot Albums (Billboard Japan) | 19 |
| Polish Albums (ZPAV) | 38 |
| South Korean Albums (Gaon) | 1 |
| UK Album Downloads (Official Charts) | 69 |
| US Billboard 200 | 7 |
| US World Albums (Billboard) | 1 |

=== Monthly charts ===
Monthly chart performance for Im Nayeon
| Chart (2022) | Peak position |
|---|---|
| Japanese Albums (Oricon) | 23 |
| South Korean Albums (Circle) | 3 |

=== Year-end charts ===
Year-end chart performance for Im Nayeon
| Chart (2022) | Position |
|---|---|
| South Korean Albums (Circle) | 32 |

== Certifications and sales ==
Certifications for Im Nayeon
| Region | Certification | Certified units/sales |
|---|---|---|
| Japan | — | 16,366 |
| South Korea (KMCA) | 2× Platinum | 544,265 |
| United States | — | 52,000 |

== Release history ==
Release dates and formats for Im Nayeon
| Region | Date | Format(s) | Label | Ref. |
|---|---|---|---|---|
| Various | June 24, 2022 | CD; digital download; streaming | JYP; Republic | |
| United States | November 18, 2022 | Vinyl | JYP; Republic | |

== See also ==
- List of certified albums in South Korea
- List of Circle Album Chart number ones of 2022
- List of K-pop albums on the Billboard charts
