= K-pop Star 3 =

- Season 3
- Hosted by: Jun Hyun-moo; Yoo Hye-young
- Judges: Park Jin-young; Yang Hyun-suk; You Hee-yeol
- Winner: Bernard Park
- Runner-up: Sam Kim

Release
- Original network: SBS
- Original release: November 24, 2013 – April 21, 2014

Season chronology
- ← Previous; K-pop Star 2 Next → K-pop Star 4

The third season of the South Korean reality television competition show K-pop Star premiered on SBS on November 24, 2013, airing Sunday evenings at 4:55 pm KST as part of the Good Sunday lineup. Jun Hyun-moo replaced Yoon Do-hyun as host and narrator, and Yoo Hye-young replaced Boom as live host. Yang Hyun-suk and Park Jin-young returned as judges. BoA was replaced by You Hee-yeol, as she was focusing on her music career instead. Changes to the format occurred, including the choice of company for debut made immediately on the live finale. The season ended on April 13, 2014, with Bernard Park crowned as winner and choosing to sign with JYP Entertainment.

A special episode named, K-pop Star 3 D-1 Final Stage, aired on April 12, 2014 before the finals as a summary and analysis of the season.

== Process ==
- Audition applications + Preliminary auditions (June – September 2013)
  - Preliminary auditions were held around the world in the United States, Australia, Hong Kong, Taiwan, and France.
- First round: Talent Audition – Check for talents and skills (Airdate: November 24 – December 8, 2013)
- Second round: Good, Fair, Poor Audition – Grading by judges into groups for audition (Airdate: December 15–29, 2013)
- Third round: Team Mission – Contestants formed teams to compete (Airdate: December 29, 2013 – January 19, 2014)
- Fourth round: Casting Audition – Being cast by one of three companies for a two-week training session (Airdate: January 19 – February 2, 2014)
- Fifth round: Battle Audition – Competing for a spot in the Top 10 to advance to the live competition (Airdate: February 2–23, 2014)
- Sixth round: Stage Audition – Judges decided and viewers voted during live competition to decide the final winner (Airdate: March 2 – April 13, 2014)

== Judges ==
- Yang Hyun-suk: YG Entertainment CEO, producer, singer
- Park Jin-young: JYP Entertainment Executive producer, producer, singer, songwriter
- You Hee-yeol: Antenna Music Singer, songwriter, composer, pianist

== Top 10 ==
- Bernard Park: Born 1993, from Atlanta, United States, Winner, debuted as soloist under JYP Entertainment
- Sam Kim: Born 1998, from Federal Way, United States, Runner-up, debuted as soloist under Antenna Music
- Kwon Jin-ah: Born 1997, from Busan, eliminated April 6, 2014 (5th Live), debuted under Antenna Music
- The Shorties: eliminated on March 30, 2014 (4th Live),
  - Ryu Taekyung: Born 1995, from Daegu debuted under CS Entertainment
  - Yeo Inhye: Born 1995, from Daegu debuted under CS Entertainment
  - Park Najin (Former): Born 1995, from Daegu
- Almeng, eliminated March 23, 2014 (3rd Live), debuted as duo under YNB Entertainment, left in 2018 and signed with 2LSON Entertainment
  - Lee Haeyong: Born 1990
  - Choi Rin: Born 1990
- Han Hee-jun: Born 1989, from New York City, United States, eliminated March 23, 2014 (3rd Live), signed under Polaris Entertainment
- Jang Hannah: Born 1996, from Yangpyeong County, eliminated March 16, 2014 (2nd Live), signed under YG Entertainment, but left in 2017
- Bae Mina: Born 1999, eliminated March 16, 2014 (2nd Live)
- Something, eliminated March 9, 2014 (1st Live)
  - Kim Ahyeon: Born 1992
  - Jeong Sewoon: Born 1997, from Busan, debuted as soloist under Starship Entertainment after competing in Produce 101 Season 2, finishing in the 12th place.
- Nam Youngju: Born 1991, from Seoul, eliminated March 9, 2014 (1st Live), debuted as soloist under JJ Holic Media

== Round 6: Stage Auditions ==
- For the Top 8 Finals, the Top 10 competed in two groups on stage with the results determined by the judges. The top three contestants from each group were chosen to proceed to the next round.
  - The Top 8, who proceeded to the live stage, were determined by the three judges as well as a 100-member Audience Judging Panel. The last two contestants from each group became Elimination Candidates, with the Audience Judging Panel voting for their preferred act. The two acts with the most votes from the four Elimination Candidates proceeded to the Top 8, with the other two contestants eliminated.
- For the live Top 6 Finals, the Top 8 competed 1:1 on the live stage with the results determined by the judges. One contestant from each group was chosen to proceed to the next round.
  - The contestants not chosen became Elimination Candidates and went through live TV viewers' voting by SMS and mobile messenger KakaoTalk, the top contestant proceeding to the next round.
  - Of the remaining contestants, the judges chose to save one of them.

| Episode # | Group | Order | Name | Song – Original Artist | Rank | Result |
|---|---|---|---|---|---|---|
Top 8 Finals (March 2 & 9)
| 15 | A | 1 | Sam Kim | 그XX – G-Dragon | Elimination Candidate | Top 8 |
| 15 | A | 2 | The Shorties | BrownCity – Brown Eyed Soul | 2nd | Top 8 |
| 15 | A | 3 | Kwon Jin-ah | 씨스루 – Primary | 1st | Top 8 |
| 15 | A | 4 | Bernard Park | 하고 싶은 말 – Kim Tae-woo | Elimination Candidate | Top 8 |
| 15 | A | 5 | Almeng | 담배가게 아가씨 – Song Chang-sik | 3rd | Top 8 |
| 16 | B | 1 | Han Hee-jun | 미련 – Kim Gun-mo | 1st | Top 8 |
| 16 | B | 2 | Bae Min-ah | Day by Day – As One | 3rd | Top 8 |
| 16 | B | 3 | Nam Young-ju | 너의 뒤에서 – Park Jin-young | Elimination Candidate | Eliminated |
| 16 | B | 4 | Jang Han-nah | 경고 – Tashannie | 2nd | Top 8 |
| 16 | B | 5 | Something | 21세기 카멜레온- Self-Written Song | Elimination Candidate | Eliminated |
Top 6 Finals (March 16)
| 17 | 1 | 1 | Han Hee-jun | 니가 사는 그집 – Park Jin-young | Elimination Candidate | Top 6 |
| 17 | 1 | 2 | Almeng | 정류장 – Panic | 1st | Top 6 |
| 17 | 2 | 3 | Sam Kim | Billie Jean – Michael Jackson | Elimination Candidate | Top 6 |
| 17 | 2 | 4 | Kwon Jin-ah | 24시간이 모자라 – Sunmi | 1st | Top 6 |
| 17 | 3 | 5 | Jang Han-nah | Goodbye Sadness, Hello Happiness – Yoon Mi-rae | Elimination Candidate | Eliminated |
| 17 | 3 | 6 | The Shorties | Let It Go – Idina Menzel | 1st | Top 6 |
| 17 | 4 | 7 | Bae Min-ah | Whenever You Call – Mariah Carey, Brian McKnight | Elimination Candidate | Eliminated |
| 17 | 4 | 8 | Bernard Park | Home – Michael Bublé | 1st | Top 6 |

- For the next three episodes (18–20), each week showcased a different company. As this season featured the winner choosing the company they wished to sign with on the final live stage, this gave the contestants the opportunity to experience and explore each company equally. The first week (Top 4 Finals) was YG Week, in which contestants received advice and help from YG. The second week (Top 3 Finals) was JYP Week. The third week (Semifinals) was Antenna Week.
- For the Top 4, 3 Finals, Semifinals and Finals, the judges and viewers' scores were weighted 60:40, and were combined to eliminate the contestant with the lowest score.

| Episode # | Order | Name | Song – Original Artist | Judges Score | | | Result |
| Episode # | Order | Name | Song – Original Artist | JYP | YG | Antenna | Result |
|---|---|---|---|---|---|---|---|
Top 4 Finals (March 23)
| 18 | 1 | Almeng | 청개구리 – Psy | 82 | 90 | 90 | Eliminated |
| 18 | 2 | Bernard Park | 넌 감동이였어 – Sung Si-kyung | 86 | 89 | 92 | Top 4 |
| 18 | 3 | The Shorties | Listen – Beyoncé | 96 | 96 | 95 | Top 4 |
| 18 | 4 | Sam Kim | 너뿐이야 – Park Jin-young | 97 | 95 | 97 | Top 4 |
| 18 | 5 | Han Hee-jun | 천일동안 – Lee Seung-hwan | 84 | 85 | 90 | Eliminated |
| 18 | 6 | Kwon Jin-ah | Fields of Gold – Sting | 96 | 90 | 96 | Top 4 |
Top 3 Finals (March 30)
| 19 | 1 | Kwon Jin-ah | 십년이 지나도 – Park Jin-young | 99 | 95 | 98 | Top 3 |
| 19 | 2 | Sam Kim | Stand By Me – Ben E. King | 94 | 95 | 95 | Top 3 |
| 19 | 3 | The Shorties | 뜨거운 안녕 – Toy | 92 | 92 | 96 | Eliminated |
| 19 | 4 | Bernard Park | Right Here Waiting – Richard Marx | 99 | 100 | 100 | Top 3 |
Semifinals (April 6)
| 20 | 1 | Bernard Park | Who's Loving You – The Jackson 5 | 92 | 93 | 97 | Top 2 |
| 20 | 2 | Kwon Jin-ah | Love – Primary | 93 | 93 | 97 | Eliminated |
| 20 | 3 | Sam Kim | Honey – Park Jin-young | 99 | 100 | 99 | Top 2 |
Finals (April 13)
| 21 | Round 1: Judges Chosen Song | | | | | | |
| 21 | 1 | Sam Kim | 거짓말 – Big Bang | 91 | 94 | 93 | – |
| 21 | 2 | Bernard Park | 사랑하기 때문에 – Yoo Jae-ha | 95 | 96 | 95 | – |
| 21 | Round 2: Choose Your Own Song | | | | | | |
| 21 | 1 | Sam Kim | Englishman in New York – Sting | 99 | 100 | 100 | Runner-up |
| 21 | 2 | Bernard Park | I Believe I Can Fly – R. Kelly | 95 | 95 | 97 | Winner |

== Ratings ==
In the ratings below, the highest rating for the show is in red, and the lowest rating for the show is in blue. (Note: Individual corner ratings do not include commercial time, which regular ratings include.)

| Episode # | Original Airdate | TNmS Ratings | | AGB Ratings | |
| Episode # | Original Airdate | Nationwide | Seoul National Capital Area | Nationwide | Seoul National Capital Area |
|---|---|---|---|---|---|
| 1 | November 24, 2013 | 8.8% | 9.1% | 8.4% | 8.3% |
| 2 | December 1, 2013 | 8.6% | 10.3% | 9.0% | 8.9% |
| 3 | December 8, 2013 | 9.1% | 11.0% | 10.7% | 12.2% |
| 4 | December 15, 2013 | 9.4% | 11.0% | 11.0% | 12.6% |
| 5 | December 22, 2013 | 9.2% | 11.0% | 9.8% | 10.8% |
| 6 | December 29, 2013 | 8.4% | 10.0% | 10.6% | 11.0% |
| 7 | January 5, 2014 | 10.2% | 12.0% | 11.6% | 12.0% |
| 8 | January 12, 2014 | 10.0% | 11.8% | 11.7% | 13.0% |
| 9 | January 19, 2014 | 9.8% | 11.7% | 11.2% | 12.1% |
| 10 | January 26, 2014 | 11.1% | 12.7% | 12.9% | 14.8% |
| 11 | February 2, 2014 | 10.9% | 13.7% | 10.8% | 11.6% |
| 12 | February 9, 2014 | 12.1% | 14.1% | 12.7% | 13.3% |
| 13 | February 16, 2014 | 10.3% | 12.0% | 11.5% | 12.3% |
| 14 | February 23, 2014 | 10.6% | 12.2% | 11.9% | 13.2% |
| 15 | March 2, 2014 | 9.7% | 11.4% | 10.5% | 11.2% |
| 16 | March 9, 2014 | 9.4% | 10.9% | 10.5% | 11.8% |
| 17 | March 16, 2014 | 8.9% | 10.8% | 9.5% | 9.9% |
| 18 | March 23, 2014 | 8.5% | 10.6% | 11.0% | 12.3% |
| 19 | March 30, 2014 | 8.8% | 10.5% | 10.2% | 11.0% |
| 20 | April 6, 2014 | 8.2% | 10.3% | 9.1% | 10.1% |
| 21 | April 13, 2014 | 9.1% | 11.2% | 9.5% | 10.6% |
