= Sun and Moon (album) =

Studio album by Sam Kim
- Released: November 22, 2018
- Studio: Antenna Studio, Seoul
- Genre: R&B; soul; neo soul; folk
- Length: 34:56
- Label: Antenna
- Producer: Sam Kim; Hong So-jin; Jukjae

Sam Kim chronology
I Am Sam (2016)	Sun and Moon (2018)

Singles from Sun and Moon
- 1. "Make Up (featuring Crush)" Released: October 23, 2018; 2. "It's You (featuring Zico)" Released: November 22, 2018

Sun and Moon is the first full-length studio album by Korean-American singer-songwriter Sam Kim, released on November 22, 2018, by Antenna Music. It was preceded by the promotional EP Sun and Moon Pt. 1 on October 23, 2018, consisting of three songs later included in the full album release: "Sun and Moon", "Make Up" (featuring Crush) and "Sunny Days, Summer Nights".

== Track listing ==
Credits adapted from Antenna Music website.

No.	Title	Lyrics	Music	Arrangement	Length
1.	"Sun and Moon"	Ahn Hyo-jin; Sam Kim	Sam Kim; Hong So-jin; Jukjae	Sam Kim; Hong So-jin; Jukjae	5:02
2.	"It's You" (featuring Zico)	Sam Kim; Zico	Sam Kim; Zico	Sam Kim; Hong So-jin; Jukjae	4:18
3.	"Make Up" (featuring Crush)	Crush; Sam Kim	Sam Kim; Crush; Hong So-jin; Jukjae	Hong So-jin; Jukjae; Sam Kim	3:28
4.	"Sunny Days, Summer Nights" (그 여름밤)	Sam Kim; Jukjae; Ahn Hyo-jin	Sam Kim	Sam Kim; Hong So-jin; Jukjae	4:10
5.	"The One"	Sam Kim	Sam Kim; Hong So-jin; Jukjae	Sam Kim; Hong So-jin; Jukjae	4:20
6.	"Would You Believe"	Sam Kim	Sam Kim	Hong So-jin; Jukjae	4:24
7.	"The Weight" (무기력)	Sam Kim; Jung Seung-hwan	Sam Kim; Hong So-jin	Sam Kim; Hong So-jin	4:26
8.	"If"	Sam Kim; Hong So-jin; Jukjae	Sam Kim; Jukjae	Sam Kim; Hong So-jin; Jukjae	4:48
Total length:					23:44

== Personnel ==
Credits adapted from Antenna Music website and album preview video.

Musicians

- Sam Kim – vocals (all tracks), backing vocals (1, 2, 3, 4, 5, 6, 8), guitars (1, 2, 3, 8)
- Hong So-jin – piano (1, 2, 6, 7, 8), synth (1, 2, 3, 8), electric piano (2, 3, 4, 5), organ (3, 4, 6), synth bass (5), strings (5), string arrangement (1, 8), recording direction
- Jukjae – drums (1, 2, 3, 4, 5, 8), guitars (1, 2, 3, 4, 5, 6, 8), bass (2, 3, 5, 8), recording direction
- Crush – vocals (3), backing vocals (3), recording direction (3)
- Zico – vocals (2), backing vocals (2)
- Choi In-sung – bass (4, 6)
- Kim Seung-ho – drums (6)
- Joo Hyun-woo – brass arrangement (4, 5), saxophone (4, 5)
- Kim Sung-min – trumpet (4, 5)
- Woo Sung-min – trombone (4, 5)
- Kang Chan-wook – cello (1, 8)
- Park Yong-eun – viola (1, 8)
- Im Hong-kyun – violin (1, 8)
- Song Hae-rim – violin (1, 8)
- Park In-young – string arrangement and conducting (7)
- L.A. String Ensemble – strings (7)

Engineers

- Ji Seung-nam – mixing, recording direction
- Kwon Nam-woo – mastering
- Yang Seo-yeon – mastering assistant
- Kim Il-ho – mastering assistant
- Kwak Dong-joon – mastering assistant

== Chart performance ==
=== Weekly charts ===
Chart (2018)	Peak position
South Korean Albums (Gaon)	23

=== Monthly charts ===
Chart (2018)	Peak position
South Korean Albums (Gaon)	67

== Release history ==
Region	Date	Format	Label	Ref.
Worldwide	November 22, 2018	Digital download; streaming	Antenna; Kakao Entertainment	
South Korea	November 22, 2018	CD	Antenna; Kakao Entertainment	
Various	November 23, 2018	CD	Antenna; Kakao Entertainment	
South Korea	January 22, 2019	Vinyl	Antenna; Kakao Entertainment	
