= Sam Kim =

American musician (born 1998)

Sam Kim 김건지
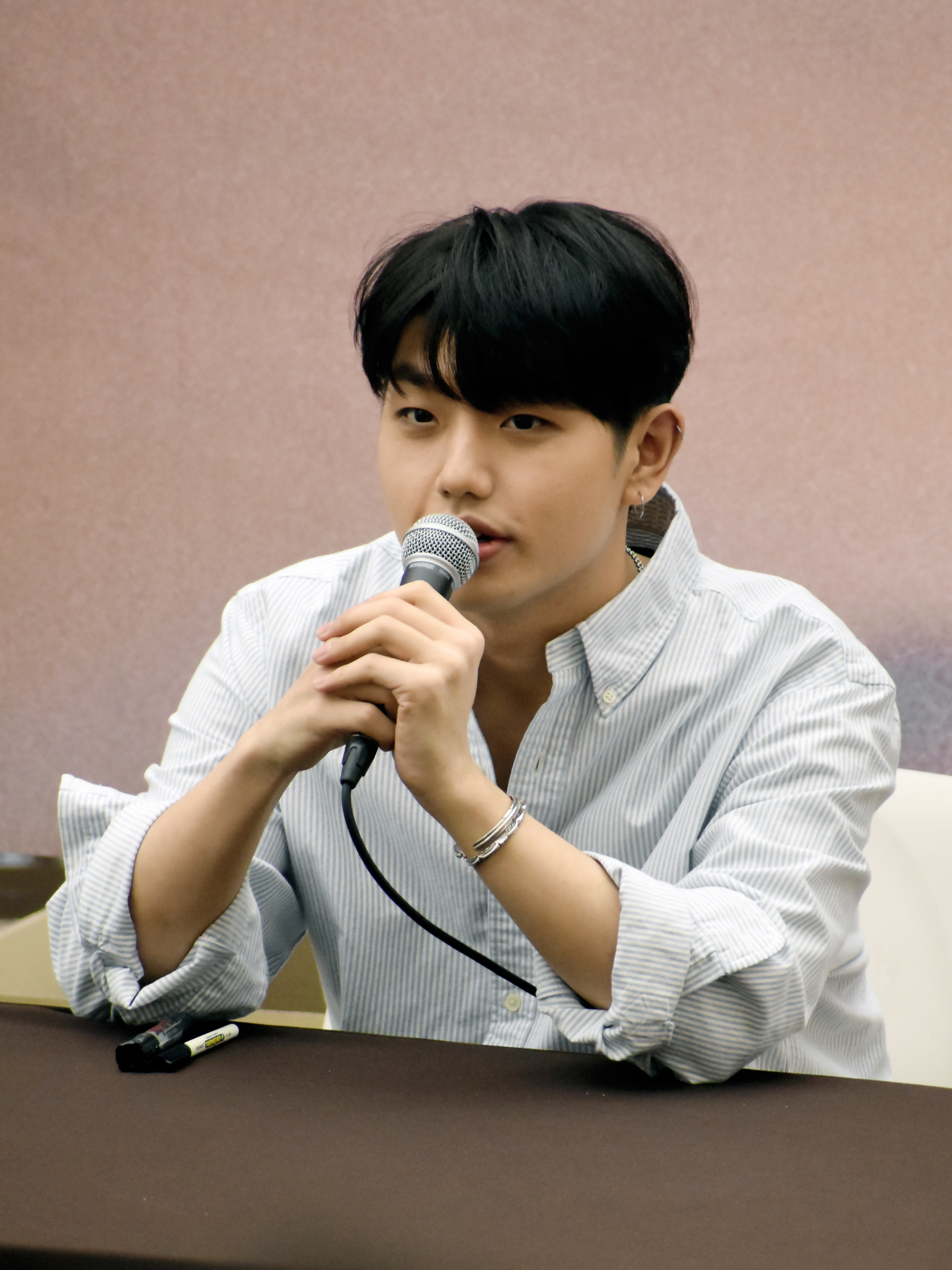
- Kim during an autograph event at the COEX Convention & Exhibition Center, December 2018

Background information
- Born: Kim Gun-ji; February 19, 1998 (age 28); Seattle, Washington, United States
- Genres: R&B; soul; pop; folk; jazz
- Occupations: Singer; songwriter; guitarist
- Instruments: Vocals; guitar; keyboards
- Years active: 2013–present
- Labels: Antenna Music (2014–2024); Herbigharo

Sam Kim (Korean: 샘김) is an American singer-songwriter, producer, and guitarist based in South Korea. He signed to Antenna Music after finishing as the runner-up on the talent show K-pop Star 3 in 2014. He made his official debut on April 10, 2016, with the EP I Am Sam, following it with the studio album Sun and Moon on November 22, 2018.

== Life and career ==
After passing preliminary auditions in Los Angeles, Kim moved to South Korea at the age of 15 to participate in the third season of the talent show K-pop Star. He placed second in the competition and was signed by Antenna Music's CEO You Hee-yeol, a judge on the show.

Sam released the first part of his debut EP, My Name Is Sam, on March 28, 2016. It contained three tracks including the pre-release single "Mama Don't Worry". His full-length EP, I Am Sam, was released on April 10. Its lead single was "No 눈치 (No Sense)", featuring Crush. His debut performance was at the finale stage of K-pop Star 5 on the same day.

The music video for the single "Make Up" was released on October 23, 2018, ahead of Sam's upcoming studio album, Sun and Moon. It was his second lead single to feature Crush. The full album was released on November 22, 2018, along with a music video for the second single "It's You", featuring Zico.

On March 8, 2024, Antenna published a post on its social media accounts, stating that Sam would be amicably parting ways with the company after ten years under the label. On September 20, it was announced that Sam had signed to Park Hyo-shin's company Herbigharo.

== Personal life ==
On January 26, 2023, Antenna Music announced that Sam Kim's father had been killed during the course of an attempted robbery. According to local media, on January 13 (US time), the restaurant owner, Mr. Kim, was shot then transported to a nearby hospital, where he succumbed to his injuries. With the investigation over the funeral was held on the 24th at the Bonnie Watson Funeral Home in the United States.

== Discography ==
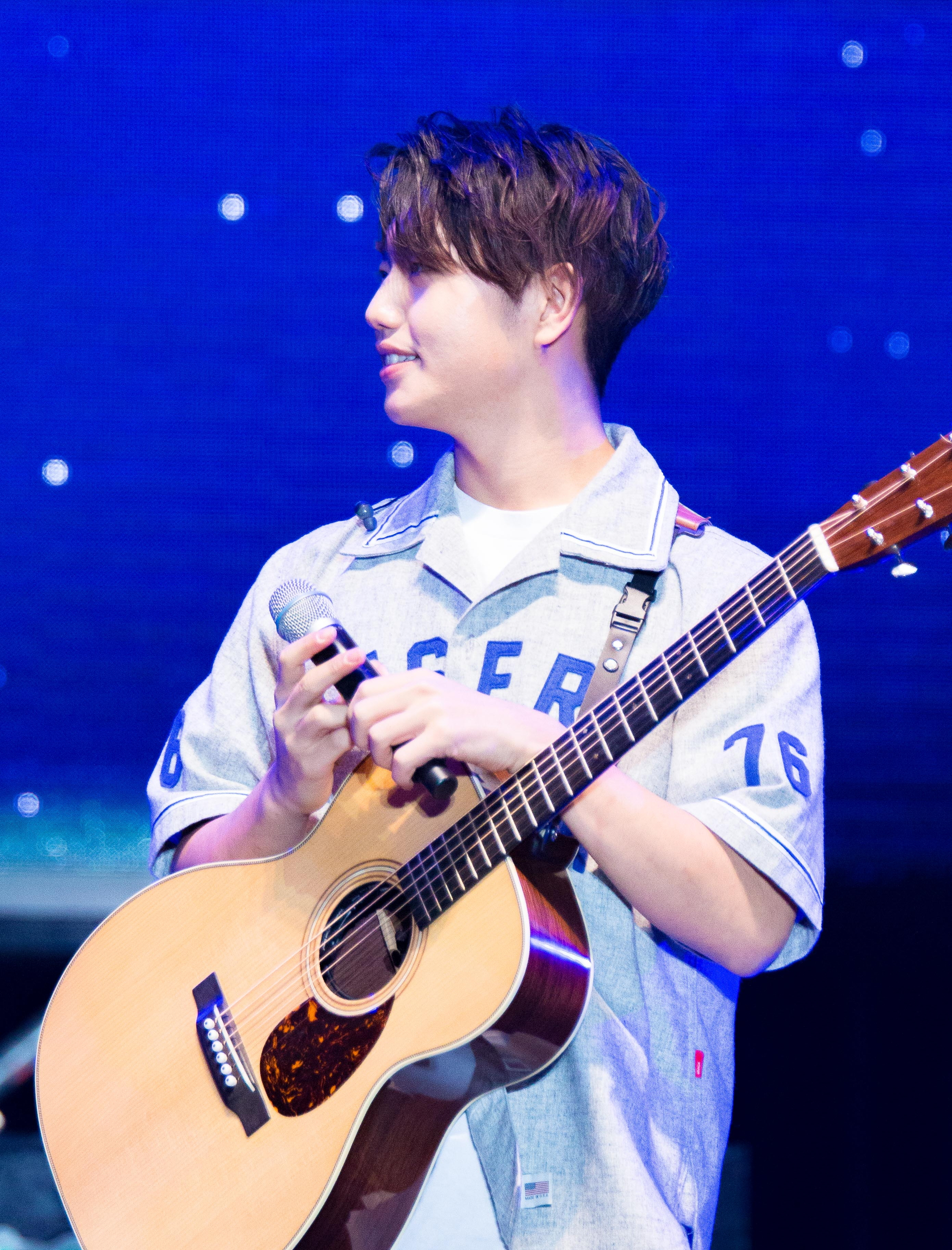
Kim performing in 2016

=== Studio albums ===
Title	Album details	Peak chart positions	Sales (CD)
Title	Album details	KOR	Sales (CD)
Sun and Moon	Released: November 22, 2018; Label: Antenna; Formats: CD, digital download, vinyl	23	KOR: 2,192

=== Extended plays ===
Title	EP details	Peak chart positions	Sales (CD)
Title	EP details	KOR	Sales (CD)
I Am Sam	Released: April 10, 2016; Label: Antenna; Formats: CD, digital download	11	KOR: 2,077

=== Singles ===
Title	Year	Peak chart positions	Sales (DL) (Note: Gaon stopped releasing download sales numbers in January 2018.)	Album
Title	Year	KOR	Sales (DL)	Album
As lead artist
"Mama Don't Worry"	2016	—	—N/a	I Am Sam
"No Sense" (No 눈치) (featuring Crush)	2016	37	KOR: 59,348	I Am Sam
"Make Up" (featuring Crush)	2018	56	—N/a	Sun and Moon
"It's You" (featuring Zico)	2018	88	—N/a	Sun and Moon
"When You Fall" (featuring Chai)	2018	—	—N/a	Non-album singles
"Where's My Money"	2019	—	—N/a	Non-album singles
"What About" (featuring Penomeco)	2020	—	—N/a	Non-album singles
"The Juice"	2021	—	—N/a	Non-album singles
"These Walls"	2021	—	—N/a	Ad campaign single
"Look at Me" (바라봐줘요) (George cover)	2021	—	—N/a	You Hee-yul's Sketchbook: 78th Voice
"Aqua Man" (Beenzino cover)	2021	—	—N/a	You Hee-yul's Sketchbook: 78th Voice
Collaborations
"For Now" (여기까지) (with Kwon Jin-ah)	2016	17	KOR: 141,804	Love Antenna
"Think About' Chu" (with Loco) (Asoto Union cover)	2017	16	KOR: 197,273	Boys and Girls Music, Vol. 1
"Like a Fool" (with NIve)	2020	—	—N/a	Non-album singles
"Everything Is OK (with Antenna Version)" (with Antenna artists) (Peppertones cover)	2020	—	—N/a	Non-album singles
"Our Christmas Wish for You" (겨울의 우리들) (with Antenna artists)	2020	107 (Note: "Our Christmas Wish for You" peaked at 24 on the Billboard K-pop Hot 100.)	—N/a	2020 Antenna Christmas Carol
"Closer" (with Jukjae and Kwon Jin-ah)	2021	—	—N/a	Ad campaign single
"Hello Antenna, Hello Christmas" (with Antenna artists)	2021	124 (Note: "Hello Antenna, Hello Christmas" peaked at 14 on the Billboard K-pop Hot 100.)	—N/a	2021 Antenna Christmas Carol
"Before 4:30 (She Said...)" (with Mew Suppasit)	2021	— (Note: "Before 4:30 (She Said...)" peaked at 4 on the Billboard R&B Digital Song Sales chart and at 8 on the Billboard R&B/Hip-Hop Digital Song Sales chart.)	—N/a	Non-album single
"Nap Fairy" (낮잠) (with Yeri)	2022	— (Note: "Nap Fairy" did not enter the Circle Digital Chart, but peaked at number 50 and 74 on the Circle BGM Chart and Download Chart, respectively.)	—N/a	SM Station Season 4
As featured artist
"~42" (Primary feat. Sam Kim, Esna)	2017	44	KOR: 92,674	Shininryu
"23" (Punchnello feat. Sam Kim)	2019	—	—N/a	Non-album single
"Bless You" (Primary feat. Sam Kim, Woodz, pH-1)	2020	—	—N/a	Paktory Playlist 2020
"Someday" (Raisa feat. Sam Kim)	2021	—	—N/a	It's Personal
"—" denotes releases that did not chart or were not released in that region.

=== Soundtrack appearances ===
Title	Year	Peak chart positions			Sales (DL)	Album
Title	Year	KOR Circle	KOR Hot 100 (Note: The K-pop Hot 100 was discontinued on July 16, 2014. The chart was later re-established following the term date of May 29 – June 4, 2017.)	US World	Sales (DL)	Album
"Who Are You"	2016	3	—N/a	15	KOR: 914,314	Goblin OST
"I Do" (with Kwon Jin-ah) "Everyday" (with Kwon Jin-ah) "Cooking"	2017	—	—N/a	—	—N/a	The Lovebirds: Year 1 OST [ko]
"Scent" (향기)	2019	137	—	—	—N/a	Search: WWW OST
"Breath" (숨)	2020	59	61	—	—N/a	It's Okay to Not Be Okay OST
"Love Me Like That"	2021	116	—	—	—N/a	Nevertheless OST
"Summer Rain" (여름비)	2022	37	45	—	—N/a	Our Beloved Summer OST
"For You"	2022	—	—	—	—N/a	Cleaning Up OST
"Confession" (고백)	2022	— (Note: "Confession" did not enter the Circle Digital Chart, but peaked at number 46 and 79 on the Circle BGM Chart and Download Chart, respectively.)	—	—	—N/a	Cheer Up OST
"Say You Love Me" (그대라는 봄)	2023	— (Note: "Say You Love Me" did not enter the Circle Digital Chart, but peaked at number 16 and 78 on the Circle BGM Chart and Download Chart, respectively.)	—	—	—N/a	My Demon OST
"Shining You"	2024	— (Note: "Shining You" did not enter the Circle Digital Chart, but peaked at number 16 and 77 on the Circle BGM Chart and Download Chart, respectively.)	—	—	—N/a	Cinderella at 2 AM OST
"Playing Pretend"	2024	—	—	—	—N/a	Love in the Big City Original Motion Picture Soundtrack
"Like a Moonlight"	2025	—	—	—	—N/a	Love Scout OST
"—" denotes releases that did not chart or were not released in that region.

=== Other charted songs ===
Title	Artists	Year	Peak chart positions		Album
Title	Artists	Year	KOR Circle	KOR Hot 100	Album
"What Do You Do When You Play?" (놀면 뭐해?)	Boi B, Gaeko, Choiza, Geegooin, Gray, Crush, Wonstein, Mommy Son, Zior Park, Sam Kim	2019	62	51	Yoo-plash
"Everest"	AKMU with Sam Kim	2021	60	48	Next Episode

=== Features ===
Title	Artists	Year	Album
"~42"	Primary featuring Sam Kim and Esna	2017	Shininryu
"Alright, Summer Time"	Loco featuring Sam Kim	2017	Summer Go Loco
"We Are" (우리 시작)	Lee Jin-ah with Sam Kim, Kwon Jin-ah, Jung Seung-hwan, Chai	2018	Jinah Restaurant Full Course
"Forever Dumb"	Soyoon featuring Sam Kim	2019	So!YoON!
"Color You"	Chai featuring Sam Kim	2019	Give and Take
"23"	Punchnello featuring Sam Kim	2019	Non-album single
"Jungle"	Punchnello featuring Penomeco, Sam Kim	2019	Show Me The Money 8 Final
"Aura"	George featuring Sam Kim	2019	LEEEE
"Awake"	Lee Jin-ah featuring Sam Kim	2020	Candy Pianist
"Bless You"	Primary featuring Sam Kim, Woodz, pH-1	2020	Non-album single
"Overthink"	Shindrum featuring Sam Kim	2021	Who I Am
"Everest"	AKMU with Sam Kim	2021	Next Episode
"Someday"	Raisa featuring Sam Kim	2021	It's Personal
"Midnight" (잘 어울려)	Babylon featuring Sam Kim	2022	Ego 90's
"Loveholic's Hangover"	Bibi featuring Sam Kim	2022	Lowlife Princess: Noir
"Same Same" (너나나나)	Jukjae featuring Sam Kim	2022	The Lights
"Only U"	Kangziwon featuring Sam Kim	2023	Non-album single
"Heaven"	Nayeon featuring Sam Kim	2024	Na

=== Kpop Star 3 songs ===
Year	Title	Original artist	Peak chart positions	Sales (DL)	Album
Year	Title	Original artist	KOR	Sales (DL)	Album
2014	"I'm in Love"	Ra.D	—	—N/a	K-pop Star Season 3 Battle Audition Part.1
2014	"That XX" (그XX)	G-Dragon	—	—N/a	K-pop Star Season 3 Top10 Part.1
2014	"Billie Jean"	Michael Jackson	—	—N/a	K-pop Star Season 3 Top8
2014	"You're the One" (너 뿐이야)	Park Jin-young	37	KOR: 39,620	K-pop Star Season 3 Top6
2014	"Stand by Me"	Ben E. King	96	KOR: 18,287	K-pop Star Season 3 Top4
2014	"Honey"	Park Jin-young	88	KOR: 19,974	K-pop Star Season 3 Top3
2014	"Lies" (거짓말)	Big Bang	77	KOR: 21,938	K-pop Star Season 3 Top2
2014	"Englishman in New York"	Sting	37	KOR: 41,031	K-pop Star Season 3 Top2
"—" denotes releases that did not chart or were not released in that region.

== Songwriting credits ==
The following credits are adapted from the Korea Music Copyright Association database, unless indicated otherwise.

Songs produced by Sam Kim for other artists
Title	Year	Artist	Album	Lyrics		Music		Arrangement	
Title	Year	Artist	Album	Credited	With	Credited	With	Credited	With
"All My Love" (English version)	2020	Park Bo-gum	Non-album single	Yes	—N/a	Yes	—N/a	Yes	Jehwi
"All My Love" (Korean version)	2020	Park Bo-gum	Non-album single	Yes	Jisoo Park	Yes	—N/a	Yes	Jehwi
"Someday"	2021	Raisa feat. Sam Kim	It's Personal	Yes	Raisa	Yes	Raisa, Jukjae	Yes	Jukjae
"Before 4:30 (She Said…)"	2021	Mew Suppasit, Sam Kim	Non-album single	Yes	—N/a	Yes	—N/a	Yes	—N/a
"December's Spring" (12월의 봄)	2022	Yun Hu	Non-album single	No	—N/a	Yes	—N/a	Yes	—N/a

Songs co-written by Sam Kim for other artists
Title	Year	Artist	Album	Lyrics		Music		Arrangement	
Title	Year	Artist	Album	Credited	With	Credited	With	Credited	With
"Ending Scene"	2017	IU	Palette	No	—N/a	Yes	—N/a	No	—N/a
"Eternal Sunshine"	2021	Gray feat. Meenoi	Grayground.	No	—N/a	Yes	Gray, Hoody	Yes	Gray
"Looks Like a Real Thing" (English version)	2022	Jehwi	Snowdrop OST	Yes	—N/a	No	—N/a	No	—N/a
"On the Way"	2022	Onew	Dice	No	—N/a	Yes	Cha Cha Malone, Adrian McKinnon, Tay Jasper, Singing Beetle	No	—N/a
"Rain on Me" (우중산책)	2023	Onew	Circle	No	—N/a	Yes	Jisoo Park	Yes	Jisoo Park
"Echoes"	2024	Jehwi	Non-album single	Yes	Jehwi, SU2	No	—N/a	No	—N/a
"Stellar Night"	2026	Park Hyo-shin	A & E	Yes	Park Hyo-shin, Kim Eana	Yes	Park Hyo-shin	Yes	Park Hyo-shin, Freedo
"AE"	2026	Park Hyo-shin	A & E	No	—N/a	Yes	Park Hyo-shin	Yes	Park Hyo-shin, Freedo, Ryan Bickley
"Any Love"	2026	Park Hyo-shin	A & E	No	—N/a	Yes	Park Hyo-shin	Yes	Park Hyo-shin, Freedo
"Sogno Stellare"	2026	Park Hyo-shin	A & E	Yes	Park Hyo-shin, Kim Eana	Yes	Park Hyo-shin	Yes	Park Hyo-shin, Docskim

== Concerts and tours ==
=== Headlining concerts ===
- Sam Kim 1st Concert: Sun and Moon (Seoul; February 16–17, 2019)
- Sam Kim 2019 Europe Tour (Paris, London, Berlin; April 27–30, 2019)
- Sam Kim 2019 Concert in Singapore (Singapore; July 26, 2019)
- 2019 Sam Kim Live: Kunge (Seoul; November 23–24, 2019)

=== Collaborative concerts ===
- Hello, Antenna: The Label Concert (Seoul; September 23–25, 2016)
- Antenna Angels Concert: 우리, 시작 (Seoul; March 16–19, 2017) with Lee Jin-ah, Jung Seung-hwan, Kwon Jin-ah
- With, Antenna: The Label Concert (Seoul, Busan, Daegu, Los Angeles, New York; September 2–29, 2017)

=== As opening act ===
- Charlie Puth: Nine Track Mind tour (Seoul; August 18, 2016) with Kwon Jin-ah
- Tom Misch: 2018 Asia Tour (Seoul; August 21, 2018)

== Filmography ==
=== Television ===
Year	Title	Network	Notes	Ref.
2013–2014	K-pop Star 3	SBS	Contestant	
2016	The Friends in Costa Rica	K-STAR	Main cast (with Eric Nam and Song Yuvin)	
2022	Tripmate: Who Are You?	KBS World	Main cast	

=== Web shows ===
Year	Title	Network	Notes	Ref.
2016	Sam Kim Music Documentary	Naver TV, V Live	Documentary series produced as a tie-in with My Name Is Sam	
2019	Sam Kim & Jung Seung-hwan Self Live Tour	YouTube	Reality series produced by Visit Singapore and Dingo Travel	
2021	Antenna TV: Clumsy Antenna	Kakao TV	Main cast (with artists from Antenna)	

== Awards and nominations ==
Award	Year	Category	Nominee	Result	Ref.
Beautiful Mint Life Awards	2016	Best Rookie	Sam Kim	Won	
Grand Mint Festival Awards	2017	Best Rookie	Sam Kim	Nominated	
Melon Music Awards	2016	Best Rookie	Sam Kim	Nominated	
Melon Music Awards	2016	Best Folk/Blues	"No Sense"	Nominated	
