= I Am Sam (EP) =

EP by Sam Kim
- Released: April 10, 2016
- Studios: Antenna Studio, Seoul; Vibe Studio, Seoul; Limon Studio, Seoul; The Village, Los Angeles
- Genres: Ballad; R&B; Folk
- Length: 23:44
- Labels: Antenna Music; KT Music
- Producer: Yoo Hee-yeol

Sam Kim chronology
I Am Sam (2016)	Sun and Moon (2018)

Singles from I Am Sam
- 1. "Mama Don't Worry" Released: March 28, 2016; 2. "No Sense" Released: April 10, 2016

I Am Sam is the debut EP by Korean-American singer-songwriter Sam Kim.

The songs "Mama Don't Worry", "Seattle" and "Your Song" were released as the digital pre-release EP My Name Is Sam on March 28, 2016. (Note: The three-track EP My Name Is Sam is no longer visible on streaming services following the album's change in distributor from KT Music to Kakao M.) The full-length EP, with the single "No Sense", was released digitally on April 10, 2016, and physically on April 11, 2016, through Antenna Music.

== Promotion ==
A music documentary, directed as a collaboration between Uranium238 and Teo Film Post, was produced as a tie-in with My Name Is Sam. It follows You Hee-yeol accompanying Kim on a visit to the United States for a showcase at the Blue Whale Jazz Club in Los Angeles and a surprise reunion with Kim's family. The documentary was released as three episodes, named "Mama Don't Worry", "Seattle" and "Your Song", on Antenna's V Live and Naver TV channels between March 18–26. A music video for "Mama Don't Worry", featuring clips from the documentary, was released along with My Name Is Sam on March 28.

I Am Sam's lead single, "No Sense", was premiered with a live televised performance at the K-pop Star 5 finale on June 10, 2016. The music video for the single, along with the full-length EP, was released on digital platforms that same day. "No Sense" was further promoted with a month of music show appearances. In addition to Crush, several guest rappers including Loco, Yezi, Hanhae and Lil Boi joined Kim on stage at various performances.

A music video for "Seattle", featuring Lee Jin-ah, was released on November 5, 2016.

== Track listing ==
Credits adapted from Antenna Music website.

All music is composed by Sam Kim, except where noted.

I Am Sam – full-length EP
No.	Title	Lyrics	Arrangement	Length
1.	"No Sense" (featuring Crush)	Sam Kim; Crush; Yoon Seol-ya	Sam Kim; Yoo Hee-yeol; Yun Seok-cheol; Philtre	3:39
2.	"Dance" (music by Sam Kim · Philtre)	Sam Kim	Philtre	3:09
3.	"Touch My Body"	Sam Kim; Yoo Hee-yeol	Sam Kim; Yoo Hee-yeol	3:24
4.	"Mama Don't Worry"	Sam Kim	Yoo Hee-yeol; Sam Kim	4:05
5.	"Seattle"	Sam Kim; Yoo Hee-yeol; Kim Eana	Sam Kim; Yoo Hee-yeol; Park In-young	5:08
6.	"Your Song" (with Lee Jin-ah, Jung Seung-hwan, Kwon Jin-ah)	Sam Kim; Yoo Seol-ya	Yoo Hee-yeol; Sam Kim	4:18
Total length:				23:44

My Name is Sam – EP Part 1
No.	Title	Lyrics	Arrangement	Length
1.	"Mama Don't Worry"	Sam Kim	Yoo Hee-yeol; Sam Kim	4:05
2.	"Seattle"	Sam Kim; Yoo Hee-yeol; Kim Eana	Sam Kim; Yoo Hee-yeol; Park In-young	5:08
3.	"Your Song" (with Lee Jin-ah, Jung Seung-hwan, Kwon Jin-ah)	Sam Kim; Yoo Seol-ya	Yoo Hee-yeol; Sam Kim	4:18
Total length:				13:31

I Am Sam – EP Part 2
No.	Title	Lyrics	Arrangement	Length
1.	"No Sense" (featuring Crush)	Sam Kim; Crush; Yoon Seol-ya	Sam Kim; Yoo Hee-yeol; Yun Seok-cheol; Philtre	3:39
2.	"Dance" (music by Sam Kim · Philtre)	Sam Kim	Philtre	3:09
3.	"Touch My Body"	Sam Kim; Yoo Hee-yeol	Sam Kim; Yoo Hee-yeol	3:24
Total length:				10:12

== Personnel ==
Credits for I Am Sam, adapted from Antenna Music website.

Musicians

- Sam Kim – vocals, acoustic guitar (tracks 1, 2, 3 & 6), background vocals (tracks 1, 2 & 3), rhythm programming (track 3)
- Choi Hoon – bass (tracks 3 & 6)
- Choi In-sung – bass (track 1)
- Crush – vocals (track 1), background vocals (track 1)
- Jung Seung-hwan – vocals (track 6)
- Kim Seung-ho – drums (track 1)
- Kwon Jin-ah – vocals (track 6)
- L.A. String Ensemble – strings (track 5)
- Lee Jin-ah – vocals (track 6), electric piano (tracks 4 & 6), piano (track 5)
- Park In-young – string arrangement and conducting (track 4 & 5)
- Philtre – synth (track 1), programming (track 2)
- Shin Seok-cheol – drums (track 6)
- Soulman – background vocals (track 2)
- Yang Jae-in – electric guitar (track 1)
- Yoo Hee-yeol – producer, rhythm programming (track 3), synth (track 3)
- Yun Seok-cheol – electric piano (track 1)

Studio engineers

- Ji Seung-nam – recording engineer, mixing engineer
- Kwak Jung-shin – recording engineer
- Jung Mo-yeon – recording assistant
- Eun Hyun-ho – recording engineer
- Jeff Gartenbaum – recording engineer
- Billy Centenaro – recording assistant
- Jiyoung Shin – mixing assistant
- Tom Coyne – mastering

== Chart performance ==
Weekly chart performance for I Am Sam
Chart (2016)	Peak position
South Korean Albums (Gaon)	11

Monthly chart performance for I Am Sam
Chart (2016)	Peak position
South Korean Albums (Gaon)	39

== Release history ==
Release history for I Am Sam
Region	Date	Format	Label	Ref.
Worldwide	April 10, 2016	Digital download; streaming	Antenna Music	
Various	April 11–16, 2016	CD	KT Music	
Various	September 11–13, 2020	CD (reissue)	Kakao M	

Release history for My Name Is Sam
Region	Date	Format	Label	Ref.
Worldwide	March 28, 2016	Digital download; streaming	Antenna Music	
