= Nayeon =

South Korean singer (born 1995)

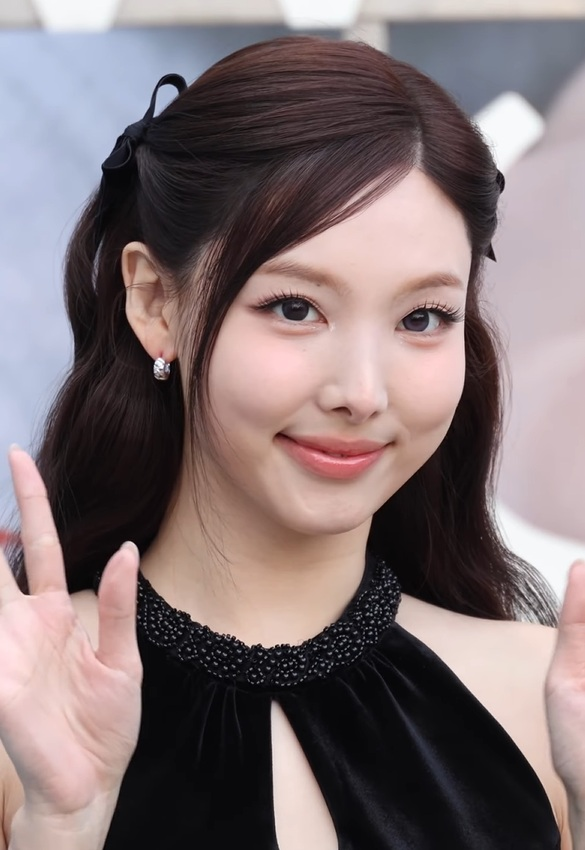
- Nayeon in 2025
- Born: Im Na-yeon; September 22, 1995 (age 31); Seoul, South Korea
- Occupation: Singer
- Years active: 2015–present
- Musical career
- Genres: K-pop; J-pop; bubblegum
- Instrument: Vocals
- Labels: JYP; Warner Japan; Republic
- Member of: Twice; JYP Nation
- Website: twice.jype.com

Korean name
- Hangul: 임나연
- RR: Im Nayeon
- MR: Im Nayŏn

Im Na-yeon (Korean: 임나연; born September 22, 1995), known mononymously as Nayeon, is a South Korean singer. She rose to prominence as a member of the South Korean girl group Twice, created by JYP Entertainment through the reality television show Sixteen (2015).

Nayeon released her eponymous debut extended play (EP), Im Nayeon, in June 2022. It peaked at number one on South Korea's Circle Album Chart and number seven on the US Billboard 200, making her the first South Korean soloist in history to enter the latter chart's top 10. The lead single, "Pop!", reached number two on the Circle Digital Chart in South Korea and the top ten in six countries. In 2024, Nayeon earned her second number-one entry on the Circle Album Chart and top-ten entry on the US Billboard 200 with her second extended play Na.

== Early life ==
Im Na-yeon was born on September 22, 1995 in Gangdong District, Seoul, South Korea. As a child, Nayeon participated in a modeling contest and was cast by JYP Entertainment. Although her mother initially prevented her from entering show business given her young age, Nayeon secretly attended the agency's open audition on September 15, 2010, after which she became a trainee. In 2014, she was set to debut in a girl group called 6mix, but the group's debut was cancelled when two members left JYP Entertainment. She also made an appearance in the second episode of the 2012 television series Dream High 2.

=== Education ===
Nayeon graduated from Seoul Myeongwon Elementary School, Seongdeok Girls' Middle School, and Apgujeong High School. Before her debut with Twice, she was a student at Konkuk University under the department of Theater and Film Arts. In 2018, during the What Is Love? showcase, she revealed that she took a "leave of absence" due to her busy schedule.

== Career ==
=== 2015–present: Sixteen, Twice and solo debut ===
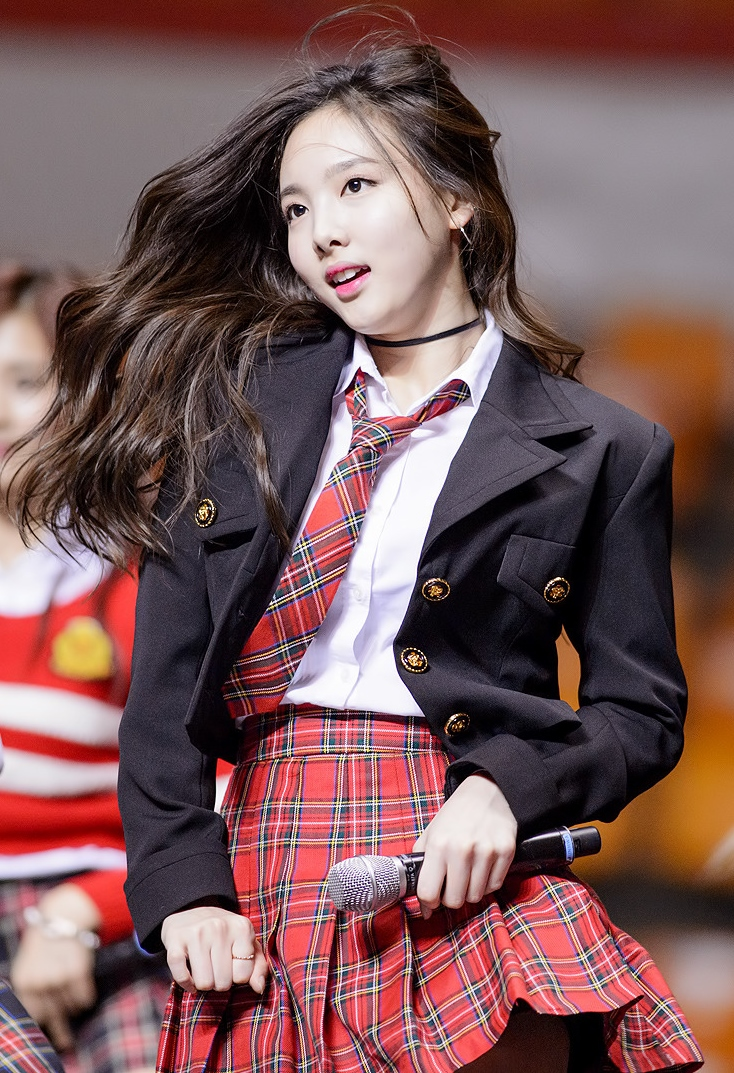
Nayeon performing in 2016

In 2015, Nayeon participated in the reality television show Sixteen, a competition to determine the members of a new JYP Entertainment girl group called Twice. As one of the nine successful participants, she made the final lineup. In October, Nayeon officially debuted as a member of Twice with the release of their first extended play (EP), The Story Begins.

On May 19, 2022, it was announced that Nayeon would debut as a solo artist on June 24 with her debut EP Im Nayeon. The EP has seven tracks, including the lead single, "Pop!", and collaborations with Wonstein and Felix of Stray Kids. "Pop!" was a commercial success, peaking at number two on South Korea's Circle Digital Chart. On July 10, Nayeon earned her first ever music show win on SBS Inkigayo. She won Best Female Artist at the 2022 MAMA Awards.

Nayeon's second EP Na was released on June 14, 2024. It contains seven tracks including the lead single, "ABCD", and collaborations with Sam Kim and Julie of Kiss of Life. On November 21, Nayeon released a Korean version of "Beyond" for the end credits of the animated film Moana 2.

In February 2025, Nayeon performed solo in Japan for the first time at Beat AX Vol.5, a music festival hosted by Nippon Television at Ariake Arena. After her performance, her cover of Ikimonogakari's "Kimagure Romantic" became popular on social media, and the original song re-charted on various music streaming services. At the request of Ikimonogakari, Nayeon released her cover version as a digital single on May 30.

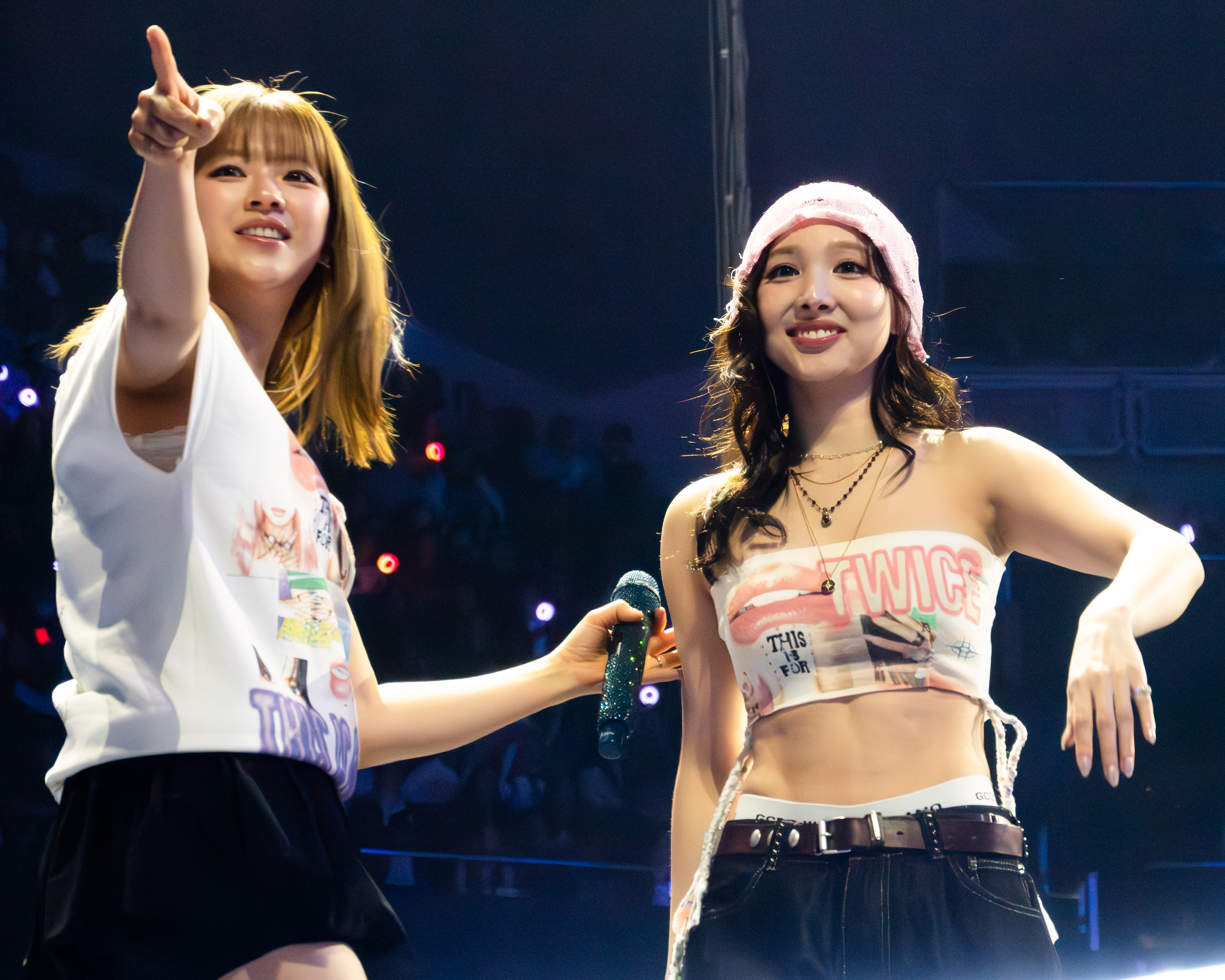
Nayeon with fellow member Jeongyeon performing live in 2026

On June 13, 2025, Tayla Parx and Nayeon released a remix of Parx's single "Era". On July 4, Nayeon performed at the Kaohsiung Beer Rock Festival, becoming the first Twice member to perform in Taiwan. On May 7, 2026, she released the song "Love Is Enough" for the soundtrack of the Korean drama series Sold Out on You. On November 20, 2026, Nayeon released the single "Na-sty" and will be followed by her first studio album, Na-stier, set to be released in spring 2027.

== Public image ==
In Gallup Korea's annual music poll for 2017, she was voted the sixth most popular idol in South Korea. In the 2018 poll, she again ranked sixth, receiving 6.7% of the votes. In 2019, she placed fifth, receiving 8.2% of the votes, and ranked as the eighth most popular female K-pop idol in a survey of soldiers completing mandatory military service in South Korea. Nayeon has been noted for being at the "center" of Twice's performances and constantly opening the group's songs.

== Other ventures ==
=== Fashion and endorsements ===
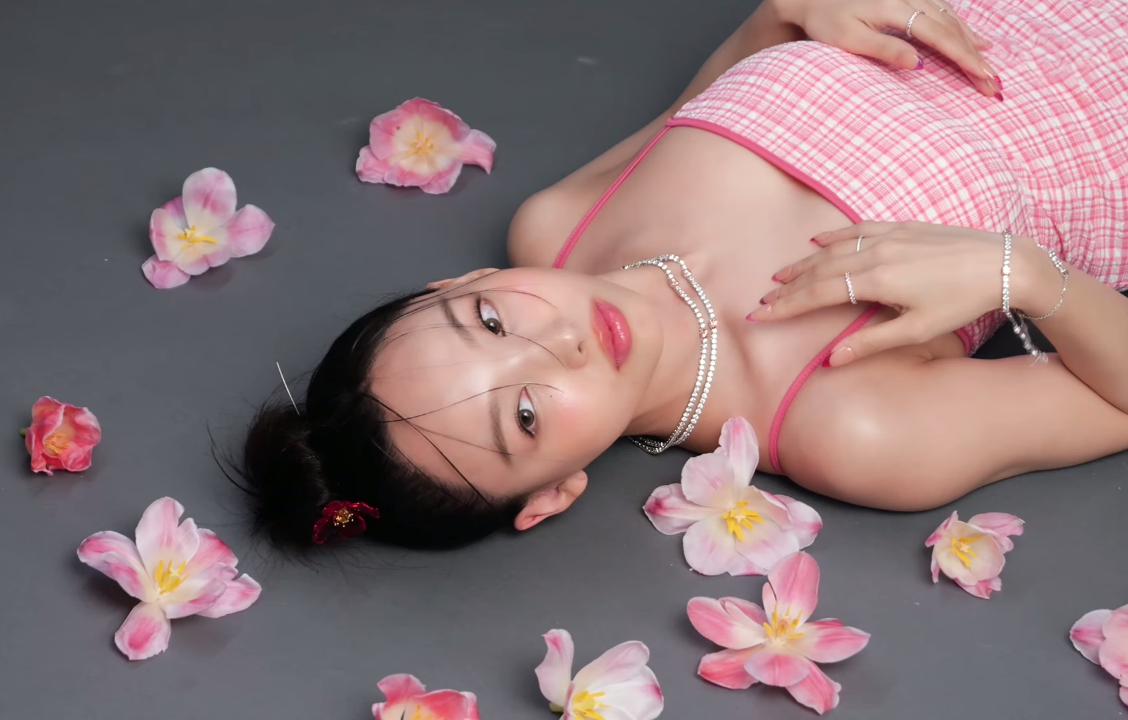
Nayeon for Marie Claire Korea with Swarovski in 2023

Aside from endorsements with Twice, Nayeon has promoted various products and featured in numerous advertisements. During her trainee years, Nayeon was a model for brands such as Smart School Uniform and TN. In May 2021, she became a model and appeared in a promotional video for Chaumet's Joséphine collection. In August, she became a model for Biotherm Korea, a South Korean beauty brand. In September 2022, she became a model for South Korean clothing brand Olive Des Olive. On January 30, 2023, Nayeon was announced as the official muse of Givenchy Beauty. In May 2023, she became the Asia ambassador for Tommy Jeans.

Nayeon has also appeared in magazines including Nylon Korea, Cosmopolitan Korea, W Korea, and Elle Korea, as well as for fashion brands such as Ralph Lauren, Jill Stuart, Fendi, and Louis Vuitton. She was featured in the April 2022 issue of Harper's Bazaar Korea for Chaumet's Joséphine collection. The same month, she was officially named by the brand as the Friend of the Maison. In August 2023, she was announced as the muse of Austrian jewellery brand Swarovski.

=== Philanthropy ===
In March 2020, Nayeon donated ₩50 million (equivalent to ₩58.3 million or US$43,500.37 in 2025) to the Community Chest of Korea to help the fight against COVID-19 outbreak. In 2023, she donated ₩200 million (equivalent to ₩208.99 million or US$155,929.27 in 2025) to Save the Children to support relief for the 2023 Turkey-Syria earthquakes, and in January 2024, she became a member of the Honor Society of the Community Chest of Korea for donating over ₩100 million (equivalent to ₩104.49 million or US$77,964.64 in 2025) to the organization.

In March 2025, Nayeon donated ₩50 million (US$37,305.75) through the Community Chest of Korea to help the wildfire victims.

== Discography ==
=== Studio albums ===
List of studio albums, showing selected details
Title	Details
Na-stier	Scheduled: Spring 2027; Label: JYP, Republic

=== Extended plays ===
List of extended plays, showing selected details, chart positions, sales figures, and certifications
Title	Details	Peak chart positions							Sales	Certifications
Title	Details	KOR	CAN	FIN	JPN	JPN Hot	US	US World	Sales	Certifications
Im Nayeon	Released: June 24, 2022; Label: JYP, Republic; Formats: CD, LP, digital download, streaming	1	54	25	6	19	7	1	KOR: 547,102; JPN: 16,366 (phy.); US: 52,000	KMCA: 2× Platinum
Na	Released: June 14, 2024; Label: JYP, Republic; Formats: CD, LP, digital download, streaming	1	—	—	4	21	7	1	KOR: 454,723; JPN: 12,961 (phy.); US: 43,000	KMCA: Platinum
"—" denotes a recording that did not chart or was not released in that territory

=== Single albums ===
List of single albums, showing selected details
Title	Details
Na-sty	Released: November 20, 2026; Label: JYP, Republic; Formats: Cassette, digital download, streaming

=== Singles ===
==== As lead artist ====
List of singles as lead artist, showing year released, selected chart positions, certifications, and name of the album
Title	Year	Peak chart positions										Sales	Certifications	Album
Title	Year	KOR	KOR Songs	JPN Cmb.	JPN Hot	MLY Songs	NZ Hot	PHL (Note: Includes Billboard Philippines Songs (discontinued since June 29, 2024), and the subsequent Billboard Philippines Hot 100 chart (relaunched in July 6, 2024).)	SGP	US World	WW	Sales	Certifications	Album
"Pop!"	2022	2	2	6	5	9	17	6	7	7	30		RIAJ: Platinum (Note: Certification for streaming)	Im Nayeon
"ABCD"	2024	95	—	29	25	23	17	73	12	2	54	JPN: 3,172		Na
"Kimagure Romantic" (気まぐれロマンティック)	2025	—	—	—	92	—	—	—	—	—	—			Non-album singles
"Era" (remix) (with Tayla Parx)	2025	—	—	—	—	—	—	—	—	—	—			Non-album singles
"Bye Bye Inhibitions" (with Alok)	2026	— (Note: "Bye Bye Inhibitions" did not enter the Circle Digital Chart, but peaked at number 110 and 115 on the component Download and BGM charts, respectively.)	—	—	—	—	—	—	—	—	—			Non-album singles
"Baby Angel"	2026	—	—	—	—	—	—	—	—	—	—			Na-sty
"—" denotes a recording that did not chart or was not released in that territory

==== Collaborations ====
List of collaboration singles, showing year released and name of the album
Title	Year	Album
"Encore" (with Yubin, Yeeun, Hyerim, Min, Nichkhun, Junho, Mark, Jackson, Yugyeom, Jeongyeon, Momo and Mina as JYP Nation)	2016	Non-album single

=== Soundtrack appearances ===
List of soundtrack appearances, showing year released and name of the album
Title	Year	Album
"Beyond" (저 너머로) (End Credit Version) (featuring Te Vaka)	2024	Moana 2 (Korean Original Motion Picture Soundtrack)
"Love Is Enough" (괜찮아 사랑이니까)	2026	Sold Out on You (Original Soundtrack)

=== Other charted songs ===
List of other charted songs, showing year released, selected chart positions and name of the album
Title	Year	Peak chart positions					Album
Title	Year	KOR Down.	HUN	NZ Hot	SGP Reg.	US World	Album
"I'll Show You" (with Jihyo, Sana, Chaeyoung, Bekuh Boom and Annika Wells as K/DA)	2020	—	—	38	—	10	All Out
"No Problem" (featuring Felix of Stray Kids)	2022	31	30	—	25	10	Im Nayeon
"Love Countdown" (featuring Wonstein)	2022	32	—	—	23	—	Im Nayeon
"Candyfloss"	2022	46	—	—	—	—	Im Nayeon
"All or Nothing"	2022	53	—	—	—	—	Im Nayeon
"Happy Birthday to You"	2022	55	—	—	—	—	Im Nayeon
"Sunset" (노을만 예쁘다)	2022	52	—	—	—	—	Im Nayeon
"Butterflies"	2024	37	—	—	—	—	Na
"Heaven" (featuring Sam Kim)	2024	38	—	—	—	—	Na
"Magic" (featuring Julie of Kiss of Life)	2024	32	—	—	—	—	Na
"HalliGalli"	2024	33	—	—	—	—	Na
"Something"	2024	39	—	—	—	—	Na
"Count It"	2024	47	—	—	—	—	Na
"Meeeeee" (Note: credited to Twice, but the track is a solo by Nayeon)	2025	153	—	—	—	—	Ten: The Story Goes On
"—" denotes a recording that did not chart or was not released in that territory

=== Guest appearances ===
List of non-single guest appearances, showing year released and name of the album
Title	Year	Album
"Daring Woman" (당돌한 여자) (with Jihyo, Tzuyu and Chaeyoung)	2015	Two Yoo Project – Sugar Man Pt. 11

=== Songwriting credits ===
All song credits are adapted from the Korea Music Copyright Association's database unless stated otherwise.

List of songs, showing year released, artist name, and name of the album
Title	Year	Artist	Album	Notes
"24/7"	2017	Twice	Twicetagram	As lyricist
"Rainbow"	2019	Twice	Feel Special	As lyricist
"21:29"	2019	Twice	Feel Special	As lyricist
"Make Me Go"	2020	Twice	More & More	As lyricist
"Depend on You"	2020	Twice	Eyes Wide Open	As lyricist
"Baby Blue Love"	2021	Twice	Taste of Love	As lyricist
"F.I.L.A. (Fall in Love Again)"	2021	Twice	Formula of Love: O+T=<3	As lyricist
"Love Countdown"	2022	Herself	Im Nayeon	As lyricist
"All or Nothing"	2022	Herself	Im Nayeon	As lyricist
"Celebrate"	2022	Twice	Celebrate	As lyricist
"Mamushi (Remix)"	2024	Megan Thee Stallion (featuring Twice)	Megan: Act II	As lyricist
"Me+You"	2025	Twice	Ten: The Story Goes On	As lyricist
"Meeeeee"	2025	Twice	Ten: The Story Goes On	As lyricist and composer

== Videography ==
=== Music videos ===
Title	Year	Director(s)	Ref.
"Pop! "	2022	Rima Yoon, Dongju Jang (Rigend Film)	
"ABCD"	2024	Guzza (Kudo)	

== Filmography ==
=== Television series ===
Year	Title	Role	Notes	Ref.
2012	Dream High 2	Jung Ui-bong's dance partner	Cameo	

=== Television show ===
Year	Title	Role	Ref.
2018	Idol Star Athletics Championships	Presenter	

=== Web show ===
Year	Title	Role	Notes	Ref.
2024–2025	Trick Kode	Host	YouTube game show	

== Bibliography ==
=== Photobooks ===
Title	Release date	Publisher	Ref.
Yes, I am Nayeon.	February 20, 2025	JYP Entertainment	

== Awards and nominations ==
Name of the award ceremony, year presented, award category, nominee(s) of the award, and the result of the nomination
Award ceremony	Year	Category	Nominee(s)	Result	Ref.
Asia Artist Awards	2023	Popularity Award – Singer (Female)	Nayeon	Nominated	
Asia Artist Awards	2024	Popularity Award – Singer (Female)	Nayeon	Nominated	
Asia Artist Awards	2025	Popularity Award – Solo (Female)	Nayeon	Nominated	
Asian Pop Music Awards	2022	Best Female Artist (Overseas)	Nayeon	Won	
Circle Chart Music Awards	2023	Solo Artist of the Year – Female	Nayeon	Won	
Circle Chart Music Awards	2023	Artist of the Year – Global Digital Music (June)	"Pop!"	Nominated	
Circle Chart Music Awards	2023	Mubeat Global Choice Award – Female	Nayeon	Nominated	
Genie Music Awards	2022	Best Female Solo Artist	Nayeon	Nominated	
Golden Disc Awards	2023	Best Digital Song (Bonsang)	"Pop!"	Nominated	
Hanteo Music Awards	2023	Artist of the Year (Bonsang)	Nayeon	Nominated	
MAMA Awards	2022	Best Female Artist	Nayeon	Won	
MAMA Awards	2022	Song of the Year	"Pop!"	Nominated	
MAMA Awards	2022	Best Dance Performance Solo	"Pop!"	Nominated	
MAMA Awards	2024	Artist of the Year	Nayeon	Nominated	
MAMA Awards	2024	Best Female Artist	Nayeon	Nominated	
MAMA Awards	2024	Best Dance Performance Female Solo	"ABCD"	Nominated	
MAMA Awards	2024	Song of the Year	"ABCD"	Nominated	
Seoul Music Awards	2023	Main Award (Bonsang)	Nayeon	Nominated	
Seoul Music Awards	2023	K-wave Award	Nayeon	Nominated	
Seoul Music Awards	2023	Popularity Award	Nayeon	Nominated	
Seoul Music Awards	2025	Main Prize (Bonsang)	Nayeon	Nominated	
Seoul Music Awards	2025	Popularity Award	Nayeon	Nominated	
Seoul Music Awards	2025	K-Wave Special Award	Nayeon	Nominated	
Seoul Music Awards	2025	K-pop World Choice – Solo	Nayeon	Nominated	
