= Pop! (Nayeon song) =

2022 song by Nayeon

Single by Nayeon

from the EP Im Nayeon
- Language: Korean
- Released: June 24, 2022
- Recorded: May 2, 2022
- Studio: JYPE Studios
- Genre: Bubblegum
- Length: 2:48
- Label: JYP; Republic
- Composers: Kenzie; Hayden Chapman; Greg Bonnick; Ellen Berg
- Lyricist: Lee Seu-ran

Nayeon singles chronology
"Pop!" (2022)	"ABCD" (2024)

Music video
- "Pop!" on YouTube

"Pop!" is a song recorded by South Korean singer Nayeon for her debut extended play, Im Nayeon. It was released as the EP's lead single on June 24, 2022, through JYP and Republic Records. It is a bubblegum song that features bright beats. It is characterized by live instruments, winding high notes, and a variety of ad libs, with lyrics revolving around a protagonist who sings about her ability to capture her lover's heart in line with "popping a lover's heart like a bubble."

"Pop!" received favorable reviews from music critics, who complimented its catchy production and lyrics. Commercially, it peaked at number two on the Circle Digital Chart for multiple weeks as well as peaking in the top ten in Japan, Malaysia, Philippines, Singapore, and Taiwan. In addition, it was certified platinum by the Recording Industry Association of Japan after surpassing 100 million streams in the country.

== Background and release ==
On May 18, 2022, Republic Records announced that Nayeon would be releasing her debut solo EP on June 24, 2022. On May 31, JYP Entertainment released the EP's tracklist, with "Pop!" as the title track. They also released a short snippet of the song. On June 21, the music video teaser was officially released through JYP Entertainment's YouTube channel. On June 24, the song was finally released through all digital platforms. On June 25, 2022, Nayeon performed the song on MTV's Fresh Out Live Show to promote it. This was followed by two performances on Music Bank and one performance on Inkigayo.

== Composition ==
"Pop!" was described as a song that "conjures classic Twice, from the fun bubblegum beat to the addictive melody and cute lyrics". It is a bubblegum song that takes inspiration from the sounds of second-generation bubblegum K-pop. It is characterized by bright beats, live instruments such as bass, guitar, electronic handclaps, drums and horn, winding high notes, and a variety of ad libs. Its lyrics revolve around "a bold declaration of confidence." Where the protagonist sings about her ability to capture her lover's heart with ease. The lyrics "explored the flirtatious and accrescent sentiments of romance using onomatopoeia to portray popping a lover's heart like a bubble." In terms of musical notation, the song was written in the key of D major with a tempo of 97 beats per minute.

== Critical reception ==
Teen Vogue's Lai Frances wrote “Pop!” pays homage to the grandiose sounds and production that embody what K-pop is known for: luxurious music video sets, designer outfits, and a plethora of instruments on top of a catchy hook that revives sounds from second generation K-pop, an era of which she's a fan. She's inspired by Twice as she turns herself into a leader, main vocal, main dancer, energy pill, and center visual all in one. With the spotlight already on her side, she's managed to utilize it as a way to talk casually and let herself be honest about her growth and creativity in music."

Beats Per Minute's JT Early praised the song's catchy energy and its usage of retro and modern sounds, writing "She sings about her ability to captivate and it's hard to disagree as the song maintains a fun and relentlessly catchy energy (the recurrent “pop pop pop”s in particular seem designed to take residence in the brain for days after hearing them). The song effectively mixes the retro and the modern where Nayeon sounds entirely at ease. An anthem for being extroverted and having faith in your own capabilities is a welcome change of pace in the pop landscape."

NME's Rhian Daly described the song as the best track on the album writing, "First, opening the whole show is the title track ‘Pop’ – a confident and assured piece of pop that's bubblegum bright and just as addictive as blowing bubbles til they burst. Nayeon sounds nothing short of spectacular on the summer-ready single, sunnily warning: “You cannot get away from me / The twitch in your eyes / Your nervous gestures, baby / I want to pop you."

"Pop!" on critic lists
Critic/Publication	List	Rank	Ref.
Dazed	The Best K-pop Tracks of 2022	8	
Mashable	14 Of The Best, Most Influential K-Pop Performances Of 2022	—	
NME	The 25 best K-pop songs of 2022	22	
Rolling Stone	The Top 100 Best Songs of 2022	86	
South China Morning Post	15 Best K-pop Songs of 2022	9	
Teen Vogue	The 79 Best K-Pop Songs of 2022	—	
Teen Vogue	21 Best K-Pop Music Videos of 2022	—	

== Accolades ==
Awards and nominations
Award ceremony	Year	Category	Result	Ref.
Circle Chart Music Awards	2023	Artist of the Year – Global Digital Music (June)	Nominated	
Golden Disc Awards	2023	Best Digital Song (Bonsang)	Nominated	
MAMA Awards	2022	Best Dance Performance Solo	Nominated	
MAMA Awards	2022	Song of the Year	Nominated	

Music program awards for "Pop!"
Program	Date	Ref.
Inkigayo	July 10, 2022	
Inkigayo	July 24, 2022	
Inkigayo	August 7, 2022	
M Countdown	July 14, 2022	
Show! Music Core	July 16, 2022	

== Credits and personnel ==
Credits adopted from Melon.

Studio

- JYPE Studios – recording
- Chapel Swing Studios – mixing
- Sound 360 – mixing & mastering
- 821 Sound Mastering – mastering

Song

- Nayeon – vocals
- Sophia Pae – background vocals
- Isran – lyricist
- Kenzie — composition
- Hayden Chapman — composition
- Greg Bonnick — composition
- Ellen Berg — composition
- LDN Noise — arrangement, all instruments
- Jane Kim – musician
- Sim Eunji — vocal arrangement, audio engineer
- Hyejin Koo – recording
- Tony Maserati – mixing
- David K – mixing
- Younghyun – mixing
- Haneul Lee – Immersive mixing engineer
- Choi Jung-Hoon – Immersive mixing engineer

== Charts ==
=== Weekly charts ===
Weekly chart performance for "Pop!"
Chart (2022)	Peak position
Global 200 (Billboard)	30
Hong Kong (Billboard)	16
Japan (Japan Hot 100)	5
Japan Combined Singles (Oricon)	6
Malaysia (Billboard)	9
New Zealand Hot Singles (RMNZ)	17
Philippines (Billboard)	6
Singapore (RIAS)	7
South Korea (Circle)	2
Taiwan (Billboard)	4
US World Digital Song Sales (Billboard)	7
Vietnam (Vietnam Hot 100)	19

=== Monthly charts ===
Monthly chart performance for "Pop!"
Chart (2022)	Position
South Korea (Circle)	4

=== Year-end charts ===
Year-end chart performance for "Pop!"
Chart (2022)	Position
Global Excl. US (Billboard)	172
Japan (Japan Hot 100)	76
South Korea (Circle)	46

== Certifications ==
Certifications for "Pop!"
Region	Certification	Certified units/sales
Japan (RIAJ)	Platinum	100,000,000^{†}
^{†} Streaming-only figures based on certification alone.

== See also ==
- List of Inkigayo Chart winners (2022)
- List of M Countdown Chart winners (2022)
- List of Show! Music Core Chart winners (2022)
