= Jung Jae-hyung & Lee Hyori's You and I =

- Genre: Music, talk show
- Starring: Jung Jae-hyung; Lee Hyo-ri
- Country of origin: South Korea
- Original language: Korean
- No. of episodes: 27

Production
- Executive producer: Choi Young-in
- Producers: Shim Sung-min; Jo Mun-ju
- Running time: 60 minutes per episode

Original release
- Network: SBS
- Release: February 26 – October 14, 2012

Jung Jae-hyung & Lee Hyo-ri's You and I (Korean: 정재형 이효리의 유&아이) is a South Korean late night music program which began airing on February 26, 2012, on Sunday nights at 12:00AM on SBS. It is the follow-up program to Kim Jung-eun's Chocolate, which was cancelled a year earlier. The program is hosted by good friends and singers, Jung Jae-hyung and Lee Hyo-ri. The program aired its final episode on October 14, 2012, ending its ten-month run due to low ratings.

== List of episodes ==
Episode #	Original airdate (Note: Due to the program airing after midnight, technically it airs the day after the day it is scheduled to broadcast, but is part of the scheduled day's broadcast day. For example, Sunday night at 12:00AM would technically be early Monday morning, but is still considered to be aired on Sunday as part of Sunday's schedule. Therefore, the airdates listed would be the broadcast day and not the technical day.)	Guest
Prologue	February 26, 2012	IU, UV, Lucid Fall
1	March 4, 2012	Psy, Sweet Sorrow, Broccoli
2	March 11, 2012	Se7en, Shin Chi-rim
3	March 18, 2012	Big Bang, Rooftop Moonlight
4	March 25, 2012	K.Will, Ali, Clover
5	April 1, 2012	Kim Wan-sun, Park Jae-beom, 4men
6	April 8, 2012	Yoon Do Hyun Band, 2AM, Ailee
7	April 15, 2012	Shinhwa, Dynamic Duo, Zitten
8	April 22, 2012	CN Blue, Lim Jeong-hee, Idiotape
9	April 29, 2012	Lyn, Kim Je-dong, Na Yoon-kwon, Ion
10	May 6, 2012	Jaurim, Nell, Glen Check
11	May 13, 2012	Yoon Sang, Kim Chang-wan Band, Yoon Young-bae
12	May 20, 2012	Bobby Kim, Gummy, MC Sniper (with Yiruma)
13	May 27, 2012	Kim Jo-han, As One, Soran (with Kwon Su-kwan of No Reply)
14	June 3, 2012	Baek Ji-young, Noel, Monni
15	June 10, 2012	Park Jin-young, Peppertones, Bubble Sisters
16	June 24, 2012	Park Jung-hyun, Teen Top, Richard Yong-jae O'Neill
17	July 1, 2012	Hyung-don and Dae-jun, Infinite, Verbal Jint
18	July 8, 2012	Jang Ki-ha and Faces, Jo Kwon, Jung In
19	July 15, 2012	Tiger JK, Lee Ja-ran, Jang Woo-young
20	July 22, 2012	B1A4, Juniel, Rainbow, Sweet Sorrow, G.NA, Dalmatian, K.Will
21	August 18, 2012	Shinee, Sweet Sorrow, Son Yeol-eum
22	August 26, 2012	BoA, Lee Seung-yeol, Ho-ran, Daybreak
23	September 2, 2012	Uhm Jung-hwa, DJ Soulscape, House Rulez, Glen Check
24	September 16, 2012	Leessang, Jung Jae-seung, The Moonshiners
25	September 23, 2012	SSaW, Jung Jae-seung, Phantom, UV
26	October 7, 2012	F.T. Island, Kim Wan-sun, Clara Jumi Kang, Benjamin Kim, Clover
27	October 14, 2012	Shin Chi-rim, K.Will, Thomas Cook, Mongoose

== Similar Programs ==
- SBS Kim Jung-eun's Chocolate
- KBS Yu Hee-yeol's Sketchbook
- MBC Beautiful Concert (아름다운 콘서트)
