= Seducing Mr. Perfect =

- Promotional poster
- Hangul: 미스터 로빈 꼬시기
- RR: Miseuteo Robin kkosigi
- MR: Misŭt'ŏ Robin kkosigi
- Directed by: Kim Sang-woo
- Written by: Kim Sang-woo
- Produced by: Cha Seung-jae; Kim Mi-hee
- Starring: Uhm Jung-hwa; Daniel Henney
- Edited by: Steve M. Choe
- Music by: Jung Jae-hyung
- Production companies: Sidus Pictures; DCG Plus
- Distributed by: Lotte Entertainment
- Release date: December 7, 2006
- Running time: 107 minutes
- Country: South Korea
- Languages: Korean; English
- Budget: $2.8 million
- Box office: $4,147,509

Seducing Mr. Perfect (Korean: Mr. 로빈 꼬시기; lit. 'Seducing Mr. Robin'), is a South Korean film, released on December 7, 2006. It was written and directed by Kim Sang-woo and stars Uhm Jung-hwa as Min Joon and Daniel Henney as Robin Heiden.

== Plot summary ==
Min-june (Uhm Jung-hwa) is a believer in true love and always very dedicated to her current boyfriend. However, men always break up with her - her latest boyfriend ends their relationship on his birthday. Distracted by the latest break-up, she bumps into a car and a man steps out of it - who turns out to be her new boss, Robin Heiden (Daniel Henney). Heiden has very clear ideas about a relationship and love: both are a game of power and Min-june seeks advice from him, as she doesn't want to get dumped again. However, when she starts to treat men like Heiden treats women, she realizes that she prefers her older behavior, even if that means that she gets dumped again; she doesn't see love as a game of power and never will. Heiden, who has to deal with his own heartbreak, as he loved a woman so much that she had to shoot him to get the message across that she wasn't interested in him, starts to soften at Min-june's attitude towards life. He eventually falls in love with her and both get into a real relationship and a happy ending of their own. Instead of trying to make her understand that love is a game of power, he learned from her that love is the purest language of hearts; no need of rehearsals, judgements, hidings at all.

One of the unique concepts of the movie is that Robin Heiden speaks only English because he finds Korean hard to speak, while Min-june speaks mostly in Korean. The two seem to understand each other perfectly without any outside translation, although in the film it is explained that Heiden understood Korean but has difficulty speaking it. This was a new style of dialogue for Korean films, and it is partially credited for the film's success.

== Cast ==
- Uhm Jung-hwa as Min-june
- Daniel Henney as Robin Heiden
- Baek Do-bin as Hong Dae-ri
- Choi Jong-ryol
- Holly Karrol Clark as Jennifer Cohen
- Kim Ki-hyeon as Min-june's father
- Lee Sung-min as Yang Sang-mu
- Su Mun as Jun-hyeong
- Oh Mi-yeon as Min-june's mother
- Ok Ji-young as Yun-mi
- Park Hyeon-yeong as Seo-yeong

== See also ==
- List of Korean-language films
