= Park Sa-rang =

South Korean actress (born 2003)

- Born: March 4, 2003 (age 23); South Korea
- Occupation: Actress
- Years active: 2007–present

Korean name
- Hangul: 박사랑
- RR: Bak Sarang
- MR: Pak Sarang

Park Sa-rang (Korean: 박사랑; born March 4, 2003) is a South Korean actress. Park began her career as a child actress, and has starred in television series and films such as A Happy Woman (2007), Bestseller (2010) and Grand Prix (2010).

== Filmography ==
=== Film ===
Year	Title	Role	Notes
2010	Parallel Life	Kim Ye-jin	
2010	Bestseller	Yeon-hee	
2010	Grand Prix	Yang So-shim	
2012	Dancing Queen	Yeon-woo	
2013	South Bound	Choi Na-rae	
2013	Happiness for Sale	young Kang Mi-na	
2013	Blood and Ties	young Jung Da-eun	
2016	I Miss You	Ha-jin	segment: "Boy Meets Girl"

=== Television series ===
Year	Title	Role
2007	A Happy Woman	Eun-ji
2008	One Mom and Three Dads	young Ha Sun (episode 16)
2009	Strike Love	Ma Ji-won
2011	KBS Drama Special: "Hair Show"	Young Young-eun

== Awards and nominations ==
Year	Award	Category	Nominated work	Result
2007	KBS Drama Awards	Best Young Actress	A Happy Woman	Nominated
