= Holly Karrol Clark =

American actress, model, writer, and television produce

Holly Karrol Clark (born January 19, 1979) is an American actress, model, writer and television producer from Windham, New Hampshire (USA).

After attending Emerson College in Boston, she transferred to USC in 1996 and began her career in television and commercials with her debut on The Jenny McCarthy Show.

She continued her acting training with such well-known coaches as Diane Salinger, Rick Walters and Candace Silvers.

== Filmography ==
- What Doesn't Kill You (2008) – Kim
- Seducing Mr. Perfect (2006) – Jennifer
- The Young the Gay and the Restless (2005) – Cynthia
- Headshots (2005)
- 3:52 (2005) – Lisa

== Television work ==
- In Justice (2005) – O'Brian's Wife
- Cheating Hearts (2005) – Sophie (pilot)
- The DL Chronicles (2005) – Tanya
- The Collectors (2005) – Paula
- Tom Clancy's "NetForce" (1999) - FBG
- So You Want To Work With Animals (co-host)
- Days of Our Lives – Karen
- The Jenny McCarthy Show – Jenny's Friend
- North Mission Road – Pamela Cummings
