= Grand Prix (2010 film) =

- Promotional poster for Grand Prix
- Directed by: Yang Yun-ho
- Written by: Lee Jung-hak; Nam Sang-wook; Choi Jong-hyeon
- Produced by: Lee Jung-hak
- Starring: Kim Tae-hee; Yang Dong-geun
- Cinematography: Gi Se-hun
- Edited by: Shin Min-kyeong
- Music by: Mok Young-jin
- Distributed by: Sidus FNH
- Release date: 16 September 2010 (South Korea)
- Running time: 109 minutes
- Country: South Korea
- Language: Korean

Grand Prix (Korean: 그랑프리) is 2010 South Korean sports drama film directed by Yang Yun-ho. It stars Kim Tae-hee and Yang Dong-geun in lead roles as horse jockeys.

== Plot ==
Seo Ju-hee is a horse jockey who dreams of winning the Grand Prix championship. One day, she suffers an accident during a horse race. Her beloved horse is put down and she injures her arm. Feeling as if her dreams were crushed, Seo Ju-hee falls into depression and quits horse racing. Then, Seo Ju-hee decides to go to Jeju for a vacation. There, she meets Woo-suk, a fellow horse jockey who has previously won the championship. They fall in love and he helps and encourages her to make a comeback at the Grand Prix Championship.

== Cast ==
- Kim Tae-hee as Seo Ju-hee
- Yang Dong-geun as Lee Woo-suk
- Park Geun-hyung as Hwang Man-chul
- Go Doo-shim as Ko Yu-jeong
- Lee Hye-eun as Oh Kang-ja
- Park Hee-von as Lee Da-som
- Park Sa-rang as Yang So-shim
- Song Jae-rim as In-jae
- Woo Hyun as Park Kwang-ho

== Production ==
Lee Joon-gi was originally cast as the male lead and took part in the first month of filming. However he dropped out when the Military Manpower Administration declined his application to postpone enlistment for mandatory military service. His role was subsequently re-cast with Yang Dong-geun, as his comeback project after being discharged from military service.
