= Dancing Queen (2012 film) =

- Theatrical release poster
- Hangul: 댄싱퀸
- RR: Daensingkwin
- MR: Taensingk'win
- Directed by: Lee Seok-hoon
- Written by: Lee Seok-hoon; Yoon Je-kyoon; Park Su-jin; Kim Hwi
- Produced by: Kim Nam-soo; Yoon Je-kyoon
- Starring: Hwang Jung-min; Uhm Jung-hwa
- Cinematography: Choi Jin-woong
- Edited by: Jin Lee
- Music by: Hwang Sang-jun
- Production company: JK Film
- Distributed by: CJ Entertainment
- Release date: 18 January 2012 (South Korea)
- Running time: 124 minutes
- Country: South Korea
- Language: Korean
- Box office: US$26.4 million

Dancing Queen (Korean: 댄싱퀸) is a 2012 South Korean romantic comedy film starring Hwang Jung-min and Uhm Jung-hwa. The film tells a story of a married couple, who in the midst of their mundane lives decide to pursue their lost dreams. The husband finds himself accidentally running for Mayor of Seoul and his wife decides to become a pop singer. It was produced by JK Film and distributed by CJ Entertainment, and released on January 18, 2012.

== Plot ==
Uhm Jung-Hwa dreamed about becoming a singer when she was young but had to put her dream aside when she married Hwang Jung-min. Although Hwang is a lawyer, he is always worrying about paying the rent.

One day, Hwang rescues a drunk man who falls off of a subway platform and becomes an instant hero. His heroic act pushes him into the political arena and he decides to run for Seoul mayor. Things go along just fine until Uhm receives a once-in-a-lifetime opportunity to sign with an entertainment agency, forcing her to choose between her dream and his. It's not long before she realizes that she can't give up her dream and she decides to pursue both.

The film demonstrates that age is just a number and that dreams can come true.

== Cast ==
- Hwang Jung-min – Himself
- Uhm Jung-hwa – Herself
- Jung Sung-hwa – Jong-chan
- Lee Han-wi – Han-wi
- Ra Mi-ran – Myung-ae
- Oh Na-ra – Ra-ri
- Choi Woo-ri – Rinda
- Ah-Rong – Eve
- Lee Dae-yeon – Pil-je
- Jeong Gyu-su – Myung-goo
- Seo Dong-won – Jung-chul
- Park Sa-rang – Yeon-woo
- Lee A-rin – Dorothy
- Yeo Moo-young – Political party leader
- Seong Byeong-suk – Jung-hwa's mother
- Song Jae-ho – Jung-hwa's father
- Chun Bo-geun – young Jung-min
- Kim Young-sun – Jung-min's mother (flashback)
- Ma Dong-seok – Choi Seon-ho (cameo)
- Jo Dal-hwan – Manager (cameo)
- Lee Hyori – Judge of Superstar K (cameo)
- Son Hee-soon – Jung-hwa's Aunt
- Tae In-ho - Assistant director

== Production ==
This is the third collaboration of singer-actress Uhm Jung-hwa and actor Hwang Jung-min. They burned up the screen in the 2005 hit All for Love, with Uhm playing a stuck-up divorced doctor and Hwang playing a foul-mouthed detective; the chemistry between the two boosted ticket sales back then. They again starred together in Five Senses of Eros.

== Reception ==
The film is lauded for reflecting social issues, as The Korea Times in its review said "What makes the film interesting is that it opts to examine the psychology behind the precarious situation, when a couple's individual interest is at odds with the other". While The Hollywood Reporter said "Dancing Queen is polished entertainment with a subtle message, anchored by an engaging (if physically awkward) performance by Uhm...and a suitably pulsating empowerment anthem".

According to data provided by Korean Film Council (KOFIC) it was the second most-watched film in South Korea in the first quarter of 2012, with a total of 4 million admissions. It ranked first and grossed ₩9.3 billion in its first week of release and grossed a total of ₩30 billion after seven weeks of screening.
