= Bestseller (film) =

- Theatrical poster
- Hangul: 베스트셀러
- RR: Beseuteuselleo
- MR: Pesŭt'ŭsellŏ
- Directed by: Lee Jeong-ho
- Written by: Lee Jeong-ho
- Produced by: Kim Won-guk
- Starring: Uhm Jung-hwa; Ryu Seung-ryong
- Cinematography: Choi Young-hwan
- Edited by: Shin Min-kyung
- Music by: Kim Jun-seong
- Production companies: EchoFilm; Daisy Entertainment; Cinergy
- Distributed by: Showbox
- Release date: April 15, 2010
- Running time: 117 minutes
- Country: South Korea
- Language: Korean
- Budget: US$3.6 million
- Box office: US$7.27 million

Bestseller (Korean: 베스트셀러) is a 2010 South Korean mystery thriller film written and directed by Lee Jeong-ho.

== Plot ==
Baek Hee-soo has been a bestselling author for the past 20 years. But her reputation gets destroyed overnight when she is accused of plagiarizing a competition entry she'd previously judged. Battling depression and writer's block in the two years since, Hee-soo accepts the suggestion of her longtime publisher friend to stay at a remote country home in a small, rural town with her daughter Yeon-hee, where she'll be able to write in peace. Then Yeon-hee tells her mother that a mysterious, invisible woman in the house has been telling her stories, and Hee-soo turns those fascinating stories into a new book. It becomes an instant bestseller, but Hee-soo's regained fame doesn't last long as she becomes embroiled in another plagiarism scandal, with rumors swirling that the contents of her book are from a novel that had been published 10 years ago. To prove her innocence, Hee-soo sets out to uncover the truth and find who her daughter was talking to.

== Cast ==
- Uhm Jung-hwa as Baek Hee-soo
- Ryu Seung-ryong as Park Young-joon
- Lee Do-kyeong as Manager/Chan-sik's father
- Cho Jin-woong as Chan-sik
- Lee Sung-min as Editor
- Kim Hwa-young as Director Song
- Park Sa-rang as Yeon-hee
- Choi Mu-seong as Middle-aged man 1
- Jo Hee-bong as Middle-aged man 2
- Oh Jung-se as Middle-aged man 3
- Yeo Moo-young as Doctor
- Kim Hong-pa as Resident 1
- Go In-beom as Resident 2
- Kim Choon-gi as Resident 3
- Seo Yi-sook as Author's daughter
- Lee Da-eun as Choi Soo-jin
- Lee Yeon as young Chan-sik
- Ha Dae-ro as young Man 1
- Kim Dae-young as young Man 3
- Lee Yong-nyeo as Talk show host
- Choi Kang-hee as Whispers (voice cameo)

== Awards ==
- 2010 The 14th Bucheon International Fantastic Film Festival
  - European Fantastic Film Festival Alliance
- Asian Film Awards- Lee Jung - ho
- 2010 The 18th Chunsa Film Art Awards
  - Best Actress - Uhm Jung-hwa
  - Best New Actor - Cho Jin-woong
  - Best Art Direction - Yang Hok-sam, Jang Seok-jin
