= The Atypical Family =

2024 South Korean television series

- Promotional poster
- Also known as: Although I Am Not a Hero
- Hangul: 히어로는 아닙니다만
- Lit.: Although I Am Not a Hero
- RR: Hieoroneun animnidaman
- MR: Hiŏronŭn animnidaman
- Genre: Fantasy romance
- Created by: Gleline & Kang Eun-kyung
- Developed by: Park Joon-seo
- Written by: Joo Hwa-mi
- Directed by: Jo Hyun-taek
- Starring: Jang Ki-yong; Chun Woo-hee; Go Doo-shim; Claudia Kim
- Music by: Jung Jae-hyung
- Country of origin: South Korea
- Original language: Korean
- No. of episodes: 12

Production
- Executive producers: Hwang Bo-sangmi (CP); Kim Joon-hyun; Jung Seung-soon; Park Bum-soo
- Producers: Hwang Ji-woo; Kim Do-hyuk; Kim Tae-kyung; Kim Hye-in
- Cinematography: Kim Young-guk; Kang Ye-sum
- Editors: Hong Hyo-sun; Ham Hyeon-kyung
- Running time: 49 minutes
- Production companies: Story & Pictures Media; Drama House Studio; SLL

Original release
- Network: JTBC
- Release: May 4 – June 9, 2024

The Atypical Family (Korean: 히어로는 아닙니다만) is a 2024 South Korean television series starring Jang Ki-yong, Chun Woo-hee, Go Doo-shim and Claudia Kim. It aired on JTBC from May 4, to June 9, 2024, every Saturday and Sunday at 22:30 (KST). It is also available for streaming on Netflix in selected regions.

== Plot ==
The Atypical Family tells the story of Bok Gwi-ju and his family. All members of the family except his father have inherited particular superpowers and they come from a long line of similarly blessed ancestors. Gwi-ju's power is to travel back in time to events he experienced. His sister Bok Dong-hee can fly, and his mother Bok Man-heum has dreams in which she can see the future, including major family events, deaths, and even future winning lottery numbers and stocks. The latter has amassed them a fortune and has maintained the large family house. But as the series opens, the family's superpowers on the wane, they are dysfunctional and failing to meet their expenses despite owning a substantial office building. The family has also experienced tragedy, including the death of Gwi-ju's wife, which left him to raise his teenage daughter Bok I-na on his own, often poorly.

A side plot is a teenage coming of age story for I-na who conceals, and then reveals to the family, that she can read other people's minds if she makes eye contact with them. However, she is miserable and bullied at school, addicted to her smartphone, and usually wears glasses that mask her ability.

At the beginning of the series the entire family have lost their abilities due to chronic disease and incompatibilities with modern lifestyles — depression, insomnia, drinking, obesity. However, their lives change after being intertwined with Do Da-hae, who is a beautiful con artist who manages to attract Gwi-ju's attention, at the same time allowing him to shrug off depression and regain his time traveling ability.

Much of the show revolves around the on-off relationship between Gwi-ju and Da-hae. While she first tries to secure a marriage with him to gain a share in his family's fortune for her unpleasant step-family led by a conniving mother (Baek Il-Hong), both characters increasingly fall for one another, interrupted by their scheming families, near-death experiences, and time travels. The two matriarchs constantly spar, seeking control over money and their children.

== Cast and characters ==
=== Main ===
- Jang Ki-yong as Bok Gwi-ju

He has the ability to go back in time and revisit happy memories. However, he has lost his ability after the death of his wife, as he struggles with depression and is no longer able to find any of his previous memories happy.

- Chun Woo-hee as Do Da-hae

A mysterious woman, who is interested in Bok Gwi-ju and his family.

- Go Doo-shim as Bok Man-heum

Gwi-ju's mother, she has an insomnia which stops her from accessing her "precognitive dreaming" superpower.

- Claudia Kim as Bok Dong-hee

Gwi-ju's elder sister, she had the ability to fly, however, she has seemingly lost this ability due to struggles with obesity.

=== Supporting ===
==== People around Gwi-ju ====
- Park So-yi as Bok I-na

Gwi-ju's daughter. A thirteen year old girl, she remains isolated from both her family and her classmates at school.

- Oh Man-seok as Eom Soon-gu

Man-heum's husband and father of Gwi-ju and Dong-hee. He is the only member in the Bok family without any superpower.

==== People around Da-hae ====
- Kim Geum-sun as Baek Il-hong

Da-hae's mother.

- Ryu Abel as Grace

Da-hae's younger sister.

- Choi Gwang-rok as Noh Hyung-tae

Da-hae's uncle.

==== People around Bok In-a ====
- Moon Woo-jin as Han Jun-woo. Bok In-a's friend.

== Original soundtrack ==
=== Album ===
The Atypical Family (Original Television Soundtrack)

Soundtrack album by Various artists
- Released: June 9, 2024
- Length: 61:04
- Language: Korean
- Labels: SLL; Antenna

Singles from The Atypical Family
- 1. "Walking With You" Released: May 12, 2024; 2. "I See You" Released: May 18, 2024; 3. "Laputa" Released: May 26, 2024

The Atypical Family's soundtrack album was released on June 9, 2024.

==== Tracklist ====
All music is composed by Jung Jae-hyung.

CD 1
No.	Title	Lyrics	Artist	Length
1.	"Walking With You" (너와 걷는 계절)	Jung Jae-hyung	So Soo-bin	3:54
2.	"I See You" (바라 봄)	Lee So-ra	Lee So-ra	4:28
3.	"Laputa" (라퓨타)	Jung Jae-hyung	Yi Sung-yol	3:17
Total length:				11:39

CD 2
No.	Title	Length
1.	"The Atypical Family"	0:57
2.	"Hero is Coming"	1:32
3.	"Super Power"	1:48
4.	"First Step"	1:21
5.	"Hero World"	1:45
6.	"Family Harmony"	1:42
7.	"Scam Plan"	1:26
8.	"Funny Moment"	1:59
9.	"Bizzar Love"	1:19
10.	"The Sign for Hero"	4:15
11.	"Not to Say"	1:23
12.	"Not to Say" (String version)	0:49
13.	"Conflict Echoes"	3:10
14.	"Mysterious Mystery"	1:27
15.	"Contrast"	1:00
16.	"Tearful Waves"	1:31
17.	"Passage"	0:46
18.	"Tides of Tension"	2:04
19.	"Suspicious Waltz"	1:48
20.	"Dong-hee's Dream"	1:26
21.	"Gwi-ju in Silence"	2:20
22.	"Tears within I-na"	2:20
23.	"Be My Saviour"	2:07
24.	"Hidden Truths"	0:40
25.	"Da-hae's Secret"	1:32
26.	"Familial Bliss"	1:29
27.	"Echoes of Sadness"	2:13
28.	"A Journey through Time"	3:16
Total length:		49:25

=== Singles ===
Original soundtrack (Part 1–3)

Part 1

All tracks are written by Jung Jae-hyung.

Released on May 12, 2024
No.	Title	Artist	Length
1.	"Walking With You" (너와 걷는 계절)	So Soo-bin	3:54
2.	"Walking With You" (너와 걷는 계절; Inst.)		3:54
Total length:			7:48

Part 2

All music is composed by Jung Jae-hyung.

Released on May 18, 2024
No.	Title	Lyrics	Artist	Length
1.	"I See You" (바라 봄)	Lee So-ra	Lee So-ra	4:28
2.	"I See You" (바라 봄; Inst.)			4:28
Total length:				8:56

Part 3

All tracks are written by Jung Jae-hyung.

Released on May 26, 2024
No.	Title	Artist	Length
1.	"Laputa" (라퓨타)	Yi Sung-yol	3:17
2.	"Laputa" (라퓨타; Inst.)		3:17
Total length:			6:34

== Viewership ==
The Atypical Family : South Korea viewers per episode (thousands)

Season	Episode number												Average
Season	1	2	3	4	5	6	7	8	9	10	11	12	Average
1	807	759	726	984	921	925	877	963	781	915	847	1141	887

Source: Audience measurement performed nationwide by Nielsen Korea.

Average TV viewership ratings
Ep.	Original broadcast date	Average audience share (Nielsen Korea)	
Ep.	Original broadcast date	Nationwide	Seoul
1	May 4, 2024	3.289% (1st)	3.796% (1st)
2	May 5, 2024	2.985% (4th)	3.104% (4th)
3	May 11, 2024	3.168% (2nd)	3.241% (1st)
4	May 12, 2024	4.056% (1st)	4.777% (1st)
5	May 18, 2024	3.883% (1st)	4.332% (1st)
6	May 19, 2024	4.178% (1st)	5.462% (1st)
7	May 25, 2024	3.480% (1st)	4.096% (1st)
8	May 26, 2024	4.248% (1st)	4.973% (1st)
9	June 1, 2024	3.613% (1st)	4.655% (1st)
10	June 2, 2024	3.734% (2nd)	4.304% (1st)
11	June 8, 2024	3.838% (2nd)	4.572% (1st)
12	June 9, 2024	4.858% (1st)	5.705% (1st)
Average		3.778%	4.418%
In the table above, the blue numbers represent the lowest ratings and the red numbers represent the highest ratings.; This drama aired on a cable channel/pay TV which normally has a relatively smaller audience compared to free-to-air TV/public broadcasters (KBS, SBS, MBC and EBS).

== Accolades ==
=== Awards and nominations ===
Name of the award ceremony, year presented, category, nominee of the award, and the result of the nomination
Award ceremony	Year	Category	Nominee / Work	Result	Ref.
Asia Contents Awards & Global OTT Awards	2024	Best Writer	Joo Hwan-mi	Won	

==== Listicles ====
Name of publisher, year listed, name of listicle, and placement
Publisher	Year	Listicle	Placement	Ref.
Cine21	2024	Top 10 Series of 2024	10th place (Note: Tied with Lovely Runner.)	
NME	2024	The 10 Best K-dramas of 2024 – so far	Included	
NME	2024	The 10 Best Korean Dramas of 2024	5th place	
South China Morning Post	2024	The 15 best K-dramas of 2024	11th place	
Time Magazine	2024	The 10 Best K-Dramas of 2024	5th place	
