= Jung Jae-hyung =

South Korean musician (born 1970)

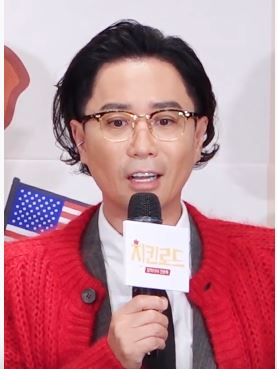
- Jung in 2019

Background information
- Born: January 12, 1970 (age 56)
- Origin: Seoul, South Korea
- Genres: Ballad; jazz
- Occupations: Musician; singer; songwriter; record producer; composer
- Instruments: Vocals; piano
- Years active: 1995–present
- Label: Antenna Music (2008–present)
- Website: antenna.co.kr/JungJaeHyung

- Korean name
- Hangul: 정재형
- RR: Jeong Jaehyeong
- MR: Chŏng Chaehyŏng

Jung Jae-hyung (Korean: 정재형; born January 12, 1970) is a South Korean pop singer-songwriter, pianist and film music composer. Currently, his agency is the Antenna.

== Career ==
=== 1995–2007: Debut with band Basis and early solo activities ===
Jung Jae-hyung was born in Seoul and graduated from Hanyang University's College of Music, with a major in composition. Before his debut, he was not affected by any kind of pop music and was immersed only in classical music.

In 1995, Jung debuted as part of the group 'Basis' (베이시스) with twin violinists Kim A-yeon and Kim Yeon-ju with the song "The Reason I Abandoned Me". In the same year, Jung composed and gifted the title song for Seo Ji-won's second album, Gather My Tears. Seo passed away before the album's release but the title song continued to influence Korean music.

In 1996, the two female members of Basis left the group after releasing their second album to study abroad. Jung continued alone as Basis and released the third album in 1997.

In 1997, Jung served as composer for the OSTs of the film Maria and the Inn.

In 1999, after releasing his first solo album, Expectation, Jung went to France to attend École Normale de Musique de Paris. During his stay in Paris, he specialized in film music and composition and participated in four film productions in South Korea.

On October 18, 2002, Jung released an OST album containing 12 soundtracks he composed for the film 'Addicted'. In the same year, Jung released his second solo album, 'Second Sound' while studying in France.

In 2004, Jung served as producer for Uhm Jung-hwa's 8th album, Self Control. Jung also participated as a musician for Lee So-ra's 6th album, Eyebrow Moon.

In 2005, Jung composed the OSTs for the film Princess Aurora. On December 3, Jung made his classical music debut with the piece titled L'etna, performed by MIK Ensemble at the National Museum of Korea.

On June 21, 2006, Jung was invited by the Korean Cultural Center in France to hold a solo concert called "Portrait de Jung Jae-hyung" in Paris, France.

On July 2007, Jung composed the ending title track "Now Love" for the film Are You Living with the One You Love Now? sang by Lee Dong-gun. On October 6, Jung made his comeback stage performance after a 5 year hiatus at the Grand Mint Festival 2007.

=== 2008–2011: Joining Antenna Music and surge in popularity ===
On April 3, Jung released his third album, For Jacqueline, six years after his last album. On April 17, Jung published an essay collection called Paris Talk, capturing his daily life in Paris during his 9 year study. On June 27–29, Jung held a three day concert called A Journey for Jacqueline. In September, Jung left the agency LOEN Entertainment and joins Yoo Hee-yeol by signing with Antenna (then Antenna Music).

On April 16, 2009 Jung released a collection of short pieces titled Jung Jae-hyung's Promenade; Walk Slowly.

On April 23, 2010, Jung joined his labelmates, Yoo Hee-yeol, Lucid Fall, Peppertones, and Park Sae-byeol, in an agency concert called Antenna Music Great Disappointment Show. On April 15, Jung released his 4th album, Le Petit Piano, containing classical piano pieces. The album eventually topped in Kyobo Bookstore's Classical Music Chart and Yes24's New Age Chart. On July 16, Jung held a guerrilla concert at a cafe near Hongik University in Mapo-gu. On September 2–5, Jung held his first small theater concert at Welcome Theater, Seoul. On October 18–19, Jung held a year end concert called Jung Jae-hyung's Concert - La nuit blanche. Jung also made an appearance in IU's MV for her song "Good Day".

On February 25, 2011, Jung hosted a music concert called Jung Jae-hyung's Avec Piano at Seongsam Arts Center. On April 15–17, Jung joined his labelmates for an agency concert called Antenna Music Warriors. On May 28, Jung joined his labelmates for another agency concert encore called Antenna Music Warriors Concert, "Always, Us Together". In the same month, he was appointed as music director for MBC's 50th anniversary special show, Human Documentary Love. On June 9, Jung joins his co-stars G-Dragon, Park Myung-soo, Yoo Jae-suk, Lee Juck, Gil, Bada, Jung Hyung-don, Noh Hong-chul, Psy, Jung Jun-ha, Sweet Sorrow, Haha, and 10cm in Infinite Challenge's music festival called West Coast Expressway Song Festival. During the show, Jung is paired with Jung Hyung-don forming the team "Paris Piggy" in which they composed and performed the song "Innocent Macho". On August 22, Jung together with Yoo Hee-yeol was confirmed to be featured on a music video for the comedian group UV. On September 2, Jung threw his first ever pitch at the 2011 professional baseball game between the LG Twins and Lotte Giants. On October 6–9, Jung held his second solo concert called 'Le Petit Piano'. With the success of the concert, Jung decided to have a regional concert from October 15 – November 27 in Busan, Bupyeong, Daegu, Changwon, and Gwangju. On November 2, Jung appeared for a cameo in MBC's sitcom High Kick! On November 2, Jung joins Jung Hyung-don to perform their hit song "Innocent Macho" in the opening of the 38th Korea Broadcasting Awards. On November 14, Jung joined 17 other artists to collaborate in recording Kim Dong-ryul's song "How We Live in the World" of the album kimdongrYULE. On November 22, Jung appears on IU's second full-length album, Last Fantasy, for the song "L'amant (라망)". On November 24, Jung joined Lee Hyori as MCs for the 2011 MBC University Song Festival. On December 8–11, Jung performed an encore concert for Le Petit Piano. On December 29, Jung won the "Popularity Award" at the 2011 MBC Entertainment Awards.

=== 2012–present: Success in variety shows and continued music career ===
On February 26, 2012, Jung joined K-pop star Lee Hyori as hosts for the music show Jung Jae-hyung & Lee Hyo-ri's You and I on SBS. Since 2012, Jung worked as the waiting room MC on the music competition program Immortal Songs: Singing the Legend alongside Eun Ji-won (2013–2014), Yoon Min-soo (2015–2016), Hwang Chi-yeul (2017–2018), Moon Hee-joon (2012–2020), and Kim Tae-woo (2018–2020), before leaving the show after 8 years, on August 22, 2020. On August 4, Jung held a music concert at The Westin Chosun Hotel in Seoul titled La Romance de Paris. On October 7, Jung joined singer James Morrison as performers for This Era's Beautiful Singer-songwriter Series - 2012 Fall Version.

On January 22, 2013, Jung was cast as one of the hosts for KBS 2TV variety show Moonlight Prince. On July 3, Jung was cast as one of the judges for Mnet's Superstar K Season 5.

On February 12, 2014, Jung becomes the sole MC for Olive TV's show Jung Jae-hyung's French Home Cooking. On March 26, Jung became a cast member for KBS 2TV's Million Seller. On September 3, Jung served as music director for the film My Brilliant Life. On October 19, Jung is selected by Hyundai Motor Company to perform for a cultural concert The Brilliant Culture Club. On December 18, Jung joined the cast of MBC's show Tutoring Across the Ages.

On January 29, 2015, Jung was appointed as the musical composer by CJ E&M for the original musical The Man Who Laughs. On July 30, Jung joins Jang Ki-ha as MC fo tvN's educational program Gentleman League.

On February 29, 2016, Jung served as one of the MC's for tvN's show Birth of a Song. On June 10, Jung joined his labelmates and appeared on Lee Jinah's MV for the song "I'm Full". On September 4, Jung hosted MBC's My Little Television on a personal broadcast with the theme of surfing. On September 15–16, Jung joined as one of the cast for KBS's show Singing Battle - Seungbu. On September 24–25, Jung joined his labelmates on a label concert called, Antenna the Label Concert - Hello, Antenna. On December 24, Jung won the "Male Excellence Award for Talk & Show Category" through the show Immortal Song at the 2016 KBS Entertainment Awards.

In September 2017, Jung joined his labelmates in a label concert titled With, Antenna, held in five cities in South Korea and the U.S.

On March 2, 2018, Jung joined the cast of KBS2's show Hyena on the Keyboard. On May 3, Jung announces his departure from KBS Cool FM's radio show Jaehyung Jung and Heejun Moon's Happy Life.

On June 10, 2019, Jung released the album Avec Piano (With Piano) after 9 years since 2010. On August 23–25, Jung held his solo concert after 8 years. On October 13, Jung joined KBS 2TV's Room Corner 1st Row as new MC. On October 22, Jung becomes a cast of Olive TV's entertainment program Chicken Road. On December 7–8, Jung held a year end concert 2019 Jung Jae-hyung's Concert L'hiver, Avec Piano.

On February 14, 2020, Jung opened as performer for The Seoul Arts Center held the Valentine's Day Concert. On April 11–19, Jung joined his labelmates for an online relay streaming event during the COVID-19 virus infection called Everything Is OK, with Antenna. On June 6, Jung together with Jang Yoon-ju left as MC for the JTBC's show Backstage 1st Row. On July 20, Jung left Immortal Songs: Singing the Legend after 8 years of being in the show. On September 29, Jung hosts a concert called 11 O'Clock Music Walk 6 - Jaehyung Jeong's Promenade.

On April 2, 2021, Jung together with labelmates Jukjae and Kwon Ji-nah, performed in a dual experience concert called Onoff Concert featuring live and real time online performances hosted by The Lotte Cultural Foundation. On March 25, Jung appeared in IU's MV for the song "Lilac". On March 31, Jung launched a series of composition through the HOME project starting with the song "Feather of the Spring". On May 4, Jung together with Uhm Jung-hwa served as hosts for tvN's On and Off. On July 15, Jung is selected as one of the seven judges for KBS's audition show The Song We Loved, New Singer. On July 21, Jung released his second single "Dance of Phrase" under the series HOME project. On October 1, Jung joined his labelmates for Kakao TV's web show Dereumyi TV: Udang Tangtang Antenna (Clumsy Antenna). On October 7, Jung released his third single "The Wave" under the series HOME project. On November 11, Jung joins Hong Jin-kyung as MC for EBS's Vegetable Earth. On December 1, Jung joined his labelmates in a Christmas carol called See You Here Next Winter Too. In December, Jung is appointed as music director for the exhibition Henri Matisse: Life and Joy presented by Gaudium Associates, a cultural content company.

On March 15, 2022, Jung was joined by Jang Yoon-ju, Lee Seok-hoon, Giriboy and Lee Moo-jin as music teachers for KBS 2TV's entertainment program National Children's Song Project - Baby Singer. On June 15, Jung partnered with The National Museum of Modern and Contemporary Art in a charity event and performance called MMCA Stage x Jung Jae-hyung. On September 7, Jung appeared as one of the judges for JTBC's entertainment program Life Reset Re-Debut Show - Star Birth. On November 4, Jung served as one of the MC's for Coupang Play's variety show Office Romance. On December 17, Jung participated as a music director in the Busan Museum of Modern and Contemporary Art's special exhibition Postmodern Children.

On September 23, 2023, Jung started his series of performance called Jung Jae-hyung's Music Voyage, starting at Eoul Arts Center, Daegu. On October 9, Jung was featured on KBS's 50th anniversary special project Black Box on Earth as one of the performing artists in the show. On December 9, Jung joined his labelmates in a relay exhibition and concert as collaboration between Antenna and LG Arts Center called Club Arc Antenna.

On February 5, 2024, Jung was appointed to his first drama series as music director for JTBC's drama The Atypical Family. On July 16, Jung is joined by Hyeri and Shin Gyu-jin as casts for MBC's animal program Our Neighborhood Furballs. On August 15, Jung joined Jang Do-yeon and Ahn Jae-hyun as MC's for JTBC's show Last Love. On October 9, Jung was featured in the fashion magazine Elle for the month's issue. On November 7, Jung led the concert for the Lotte Love Family Concert for Lotte's employees and their families. On November 19, Jung together with Kyuhyun served as MC's for KBS 2TV's music talk show Missing (ME + SING).

On January 12, 2025, Jung participated as one of the judges for ENA's survival music show called Undercover. On May 3, Jung guested on ENA's show World Dice Tour Season 3 alongside Lee Jang-woo and Cha Joo-young as they travel Mauritius, Sahara Desert and Nile River. On June 20, Jung was joined by musician Code Kunst as hosts for Mnet's music talk show Live Wire. On August 11, Jung joined Kim Na-young for Netflix's variety show called 'Closet Wars'. On August 27, SBS announced Jung's participation as one of the judges for a music audition show called Our Ballad, to premier on September 23.

== Discography ==
=== With the band Basis ===
Album Title	Year
Looking for Myself	1995
The Unbalance	1996
Friends	1997

=== As a solo artist ===
Album title	Year
Expectations	1999
Second Sound	2002
For Jacqueline	2008
Promenade, Walk Slowly: A Collection	2009
Le Petit Piano	2010
Avec Piano	2019

=== Singles ===
List of singles, showing year released, selected chart positions, and name of the album
Title	Year	Peak chart positions	Album
Title	Year	KOR Circle	Album
"L'etna"	2006	—	Non-album Single
"Feather of the Spring"	2021	—	Non-album Single (Series of single releases under 'HOME' project)
"Dance of Phrase"	2021	—	Non-album Single (Series of single releases under 'HOME' project)
"The Wave"	2021	—	Non-album Single (Series of single releases under 'HOME' project)

=== Soundtrack appearances/contributions ===
Soundtrack title	Year	Album/show/film	Notes
Maria and The Inn	1997	Maria and The Inn OST	Composed the whole soundtrack
Addicted	2002	Addicted OST	Composed the whole soundtrack
Princess Aurora	2005	Princess Aurora OST	Composed the whole soundtrack
Seducing Mr. Perfect	2006	Seducing Mr. Perfect OST	Composed the whole soundtrack
Now Love	2007	Are You Living with the One You Love Now? OST	Performed by Lee Dong-gun
Cat On The Roof	2008	Off the Record Hyori Title Track	Performed by Lee Hyori
Kangaroo	2010	Petty Romance OST	Performed by Lee Sun-kyun and Choi Kang-hee
Human Documentary Love	2011	Human Documentary Love OST	Composed the whole soundtrack
My Brilliant Life	2014	My Brilliant Life OST	Served as Music Director
The Man Who Laughs	2015	The Man Who Laughs OST	Composed the whole soundtrack for the musical
Beyond the Podium	2019	From Taebaek to Geumgang - The Joy of Wrestling OST	Composed and Performed
The Atypical Family	2024	The Atypical Family OST	Composed the whole soundtrack
The Dream Life of Mr. Kim	2025	The Dream Life of Mr. Kim OST	Composed the whole soundtrack

=== Other appearances ===
Title	Year	Notes
Dream (Jang Yoon-ju's 1st Full Length Album)	2008	Jung featured as Pianist
Innocent Macho (with Jung Hyung-don forming the team 'Paris Piggy')	2011	Composed and performed during MBC's Infinity Challenge Song Festival
How We Live in the World (Kim Dong-ryul's album "kimdongrYULE")	2011	Jung joined 17 other artists to record the vocals
Voice (Kim ye-rim's title track for second mini-album)	2013	Featured as vocals with Yoo Hee-yeol, Swings, and Pure Kim
Who Am I (UV's single)	2018	Featured with Yoo Hee-yeol
Everything Is OK (with Antenna Ver.) (Original song by the band Peppertones)	2020	with Antenna artists
See You Here Next Winter Too (Antenna Christmas Carol)	2021	with Antenna artists

== Songwriting credits ==
The following credits are adapted from the Korea Music Copyright Association database, unless indicated otherwise.

Songs produced by Jung Jae-hyung for other artists/shows
Title	Year	Artist/Show	Album	Lyrics		Music		Arrangement	
Title	Year	Artist/Show	Album	Credited	With	Credited	With	Credited	With
"Gather My Tears"	1995	Seo Ji-won	Seo Jiwon 2. Tears	No	—N/a	Yes	—N/a	No	—N/a
"Again"	1996	Byun Jin-sub	Non-album single	No	—N/a	Yes	—N/a	No	—N/a
"훗날나 저럼"	1996	Park Seung-hwa	Non-album single	No	—N/a	Yes	—N/a	No	—N/a
"Gather My Tears" (Remix Version)	1997	Seo Ji-won	Seo Jiwon BEST	No	—N/a	Yes	—N/a	Yes	Song Jihoon
"그때가 오면"	1997	Kim Hye-rim	The Beginning	No	—N/a	Yes	—N/a	No	—N/a
"옛 연인"	1997	Kim Hye-rim	The Beginning	No	—N/a	Yes	—N/a	No	—N/a
"별"	1997	Son Ji-chang	Non-album single	No	—N/a	Yes	—N/a	Yes	—N/a
"금지된"	1998	Lee So-ra	슬픔과 분노에 관한	No	—N/a	Yes	—N/a	Yes	—N/a
"Blue Sky"	1998	Lee So-ra	이소라 Best	No	—N/a	Yes	—N/a	Yes	—N/a
"Close"	1998	Kim Won-jun	Self Destruction	No	—N/a	No	—N/a	Yes	—N/a
"The Sketch Inside My Memory"	1998	Kim Won-jun	Self Destruction	No	—N/a	Yes	—N/a	Yes	—N/a
""Cactus" (선인장)"	1998	Uhm Jung-hwa	Invitation	No	—N/a	Yes	—N/a	Yes	—N/a
"나와 가튼는모를 흐릴 구야"	1998	An Mun-sik	Non-album single	No	—N/a	No	—N/a	Yes	—N/a
"Separation of the soul"	1998	Lee Dong-gun	Time To Fly	No	—N/a	Yes	—N/a	—N/a	—N/a
"우리는 끝난건데(We Are Finished)"	1998	Lee Moon-se	Sometimes	No	—N/a	Yes	—N/a	Yes	—N/a
"저무는 길"	1999	Roh Young-sim	Non-album single	No	—N/a	Yes	—N/a	Yes	—N/a
"Long Afternoon"	1999	Uhm Jung-hwa	005.1999.06	No	—N/a	Yes	—N/a	Yes	—N/a
"Promise"	1999	Ryu Si-won	Non-album single	No	—N/a	Yes	—N/a	Yes	—N/a
"고백"	2000	Kim Min-jong	6th: 왜	No	—N/a	Yes	—N/a	Yes	—N/a
"You are the One"	2000	Go Ho-kyung	Goodwill	No	—N/a	Yes	—N/a	No	—N/a
"서로 다른 길"	2001	Linae	Linae vol.1 - The First Album	No	—N/a	Yes	—N/a	Yes	—N/a
"Eternity"	2004	Uhm Jung-hwa	Self-Control	Yes	—N/a	Yes	—N/a	Yes	—N/a
"Everything Is Changed"	2004	Uhm Jung-hwa	Self-Control	Yes	—N/a	Yes	—N/a	Yes	—N/a
"In This Rain"	2004	Uhm Jung-hwa	Self-Control	Yes	—N/a	Yes	—N/a	Yes	—N/a
"지금도 널 바라보며"	2004	Uhm Jung-hwa	Self-Control	Yes	—N/a	No	—N/a	No	—N/a
"Siren"	2004	Lee So-ra	Eyebrow Moon	No	—N/a	Yes	—N/a	Yes	—N/a
"그대 내게 다시 (You Come Back to Me)"	2006	Kim Hyung-suk	김형석 With Friends	No	—N/a	No	—N/a	Yes	—N/a
"Gather My Tears" (Remake)	2006	Bae Seul-ki	Non-album single	No	—N/a	Yes	—N/a	No	—N/a
"그리구 남겨 진상 저"	2007	Illumina	Illumina	Yes	—N/a	Yes	—N/a	—N/a	—N/a
"Picnic"	2008	Sung Si-kyung	Here in My Heart	Yes	—N/a	Yes	—N/a	—N/a	—N/a
"Edge of the World" (Original and Acoustic Version)	2009	에반(Evan)	Sense & Sensibility	Yes	—N/a	Yes	—N/a	—N/a	—N/a
"비(Rain)"	2010	Kim Hyo-jin	Love Tree Project	Yes	—N/a	Yes	—N/a	—N/a	—N/a
"You are the One" (Remake)	2010	Rumble Fish	If You Know Someone Good, Introduce Me to Them	No	—N/a	Yes	—N/a	No	—N/a
"Innocent Macho"	2011	Jung Jae-hyung with Jung Hyung-don	MBC ShowInfinite Challenge West Coast Expressway Song Festival	Yes	—N/a	Yes	—N/a	—N/a	—N/a
"L'amant"	2011	IU	Last Fantasy	Yes	—N/a	Yes	—N/a	—N/a	—N/a
"한 걸음 한 걸음"	2014	Joo Hyun-mi	KBS show Million Seller	Yes	Lee Kwang-seok	Yes	—N/a	No	—N/a
"한 걸음 한 걸음"	2014	Joo Hyun-mi	주현미 30th Anniversary Album	Yes	Lee Kwang-seok	Yes	—N/a	Yes	—N/a
"Gather My Tears" (Remake for show use)	2015	Lyn	JTBC Show Two Yoo Project Sugar Man	No	—N/a	Yes	—N/a	No	—N/a
"Gather My Tears" (Remake for show use)	2015 2017 2019	Kang Kyun-sung; Ock Joo-hyun; Woo Jin-young	MBC Show King of Mask Singer	No	—N/a	Yes	—N/a	No	—N/a
"You Never Know (그댄 모르죠)"	2017	KBS show Hyena on the Keyboard	Non-album single	Yes	—N/a	Yes	—N/a	Yes	—N/a
""Abandoned" (내가 날 버린 이유)"	2019	Brown Eyed Girls	RE_vive	No	—N/a	Yes	—N/a	No	—N/a
"Step by Step"	2020	Hui(singer)	MBC show Super Five - Hello Goodbye Concert	Yes	Lee Kwang-seok	Yes	—N/a	No	—N/a
"Introduce Me a Good Person"	2020	Joy	Hospital Playlist OST Part 2	No	—N/a	Yes	—N/a	No	—N/a
"With My Tears" (Remake of 'Gather My Tears' for drama use)	2020	Wheein	Hospital PlaylistOST Part 8	No	—N/a	Yes	—N/a	No	—N/a
"With My Tears" (Remake of 'Gather My Tears' for drama use)	2021	Mido and Falasol	Hospital Playlist OST Special	No	—N/a	Yes	—N/a	No	—N/a
"You're My Hero"	2022	KBS show Baby Singer	Non-album single	Yes	—N/a	Yes	—N/a	Yes	—N/a
"여름 공원 (Summer Park)"	2022	Son Tae-jin	The Present 'Today's'	Yes	—N/a	Yes	—N/a	Yes	—N/a

== Filmography ==
=== Television shows ===
Year	Title	Notes
2011	Infinite Challenge	Guest
2011	You Hee-yeol's Sketchbook	Guest (Also in 2013, 2014, 2017, 2019, 2020)
2011	Happy Together	Guest
2012	Jung Jae-hyung & Lee Hyo-ri's You and I	Host
2012	Running Man	Guest
2012	TV Animal Farm	Guest
2012	Immortal Songs: Singing Legend	Host up until 2020
2013	Moonlight Prince	Host
2013	Star Beauty Road	Guest
2013	Superstar K 5	Judge
2013	Song for You	Guest
2014	Jung Jae-hyung's French Home Cooking	Host
2014	Million Seller	Cast Member
2014	K-pop Star 3	Guest
2014	Korean Food Battle 2	Guest
2014	Tutoring Across the Ages	Cast Member
2015	K-pop Star 4	Guest
2015	Gentleman League	Host
2015	Two Yoo Project Sugar Man	Guest
2016	Birth of a Song	Host
2016	Singing Battle - Seungbu	Cast Member
2017	Happy Together 3	Guest
2017	Let's Eat Dinner Together	Guest
2018	Hyena on Keyboard	Cast Member
2018	Busted!	Guest
2018	My Little Old Boy	Guest
2019	Happy Together 4	Guest
2019	Met Through Work	Guest
2019	Backstage 1st Row	Host until June 6, 2020
2019	Chicken Road	Cast Member
2019	Hangout with Yoo	Guest
2020	Hangout with Yoo	Guest
2021	Hangout with Yoo	Guest
2021	On and Off	Host
2021	Long Live Independence	Guest
2021	The Song We Loved, New Singer	Judge
2021	Vegetables District	Host with Hong Jin-kyung
2021	Master in the House	Guest
2022	Baby Singer	Teacher
2022	Seoul Check-in	Guest
2022	Omniscient Interfering View	Guest
2022	Star Birth	Star maker
2022	Amazing Saturday	Guest
2023	Black Box on Earth	Cast Member
2024	Radio Star	Guest
2024	The Seasons - Lee Hyori's Red Carpet	Guest
2024	Our Neighborhood Furballs	Cast Member
2024	Last Love	Cast Member
2024	Missing	Cast Member
2024	Whenever I Have a Chance.	Guest
2024	I Live Alone	Guest
2025	Undercover	Judge
2025	Please Take Care of My Refrigerator	Guest
2025	World Dice Tour Season 3	Guest
2025	Live Wire	Host
2025	Closet Wars	Host
2025	Our Ballad	Judge
2026	Our Ballad 2	Judge
2026	백수 이세돌 (Unemployed Lee Se-dol)	Cast Member

=== Television drama series ===
Year	Title	Role	Notes	Ref.
2011	High Kick	Debt Collector	Cameo	

=== Web series/shows ===
Year	Title	Role	Notes	Ref.
2021	My Little Television	Host		
2021	Fifteen Nights of Business Trip	Cast Member	With Antenna Artists	
2021	Dereumyi TV: Udang Tangtang Antenna	Cast Member	With Antenna Artists	
2021	Shoveling Today	Cast Member	Season 1	
2022	Shoveling Today	Cast Member	Season 2	
2022	Office Romance	Host		

== Awards and nominations ==
Year	Award Ceremony	Category	Nominee/Work	Result	Ref.
2011	MBC Entertainment Awards	Popularity Award	Jung Jae-hyung	Won	
2016	KBS Entertainment Awards	Talk & Show Category Male Excellence Award	Jung Jae-hyung	Won	

== Commercial endorsements and ambassadorship ==
On August 2, 2011, Jung was selected as a model for his first ever commercial for Hyundai Motor Company's 'i30' car. On September 1, Jung and Jung Hyung-don (Paris Piggy), were selected as models for SK Telink in a commercial. On October 7, Jung together with Yoo Hee-yeol, were selected as the advertising models for LG Electronics' Optimus LTE smartphone.

On April 28, 2021, Jung became the first honorary guide dog ambassador for the Samsung Fire & Marine Insurance Guide Dog School. On June 24, Jung joins his labelmates Kwon Jinah, Peppertones and Sam Kim in campaigning Samsung Electronics' Lifestyle TV.

== Bibliography ==
- Jung Jae-hyung (2008). Paris Talk: 자클린 오늘은 잠들어라 [Paris Talk: Jacqueline, please sleep today] (in Korean). Vbook. ISBN 978-89-93037-02-9.
