= Invitation (Uhm Jung-hwa album) =

Studio album by Uhm Jung-hwa
- Released: July 1, 1998
- Recorded: 1998
- Studio: Seoul Studio, Dream Factory
- Genre: K-pop, dance
- Length: 43:34
- Language: Korean
- Label: PolyGram
- Producer: Kwon Jeong-woo

Uhm Jung-hwa chronology
| After Love (1997) | Invitation (1998) | 005.1999.06 (1999) |

Singles from Invitation
- 1. "Poison"; 2. "Invitation"; 3. "Finding Hidden Image"

Invitation is the fourth studio album by South Korean singer Uhm Jung-hwa. It was released on July 1, 1998, through PolyGram. Primarily a dance record, the album features contributions from writers and producers Joo Young-hoon, Jae Chong of Solid, and Park Jin-young. Invitation continued to establish Uhm's image as a fashion icon.

The album produced a string of hit singles: "Poison", "Invitation" (초대; Chodae) and "Finding Hidden Image" (숨은 그림 찾기; Sumeun geurim chatgi). The former two became signature songs for Uhm; in early-2015, they reappeared on the Gaon Digital Chart at number one and number nineteen, respectively. Invitation was a commercially successful release, becoming the first number one album on South Korea's new monthly charts, recording 180,000 copies in August 1998. It eventually moved more than 450,000 copies. The album was supported by Uhm's debut live concert, titled Temptation of a Thousand Years, in November 1998.

== Background and development ==
Uhm recruited songwriter Joo Young-hoon to work on the release, following the unexpected success of "Rose of Betrayal" from her previous studio album, After Love, which he wrote and compose. Joo contributed two songs to Invitation: "Poison" and "Working Girl". Uhm initially hated "Poison" and complained about its trot influence, but nevertheless she "bit the bullet" and released it as the album's lead single, greatly exceeding expectations. The song was originally intended for the girl group Baby V.O.X., with more of a hip-hop rhythm. The song was re-arranged with a faster beat and its lyrics were rewritten to better suit Uhm.

Singer and producer Park Jin-young, now better known as the founder of JYP Entertainment, wrote the album's title track, "Invitation", following a drinking party between the two. Uhm phoned him the next day and asked, "So when can I get Mr. Jin-young's song? You promised to give me a song yesterday". Park, who drank too much and couldn't remember the situation, decided he couldn't backpedal on his word and composed "Invitation" in a haste. In 2019, Park remarked: "It was created by making use of all the feelings. It was made only for Uhm Jung-hwa."

== Singles and promotion ==
The album's lead single, "Poison", is an electronic dance track influenced by techno and hip-hop, with a music video that featured actor Cha Seung-won when he first worked as a fashion model. The album's second single and title track, "Invitation", is a minimalist production backed by a disco rhythm, while its lyrics express a fascination with the opposite sex.

Uhm Jung-hwa performed her debut live concert, Temptation of a Thousand Years, on November 28 and 29, 1998, at the Education and Culture Center in Yangjae-dong, Seocho-gu, Seoul, with two concerts on both days. The concert was themed as to declare a "transformation" from "an innocent girl to a mature woman", with Uhm's intent to create a "dramatic" stage with a storyline—similar to productions by American singers Madonna and Michael Jackson. Kim Gap-sik of DongA commented that she resembled the Roman god Janus, in that Uhm showcased both a "seemingly subtle sexy look" and a barefaced "girl next door" persona over its duration. The concert was especially notable for showing the uncut "Invitation" music video with Uhm's upper body nudity scenes. Cable channel Catch One broadcast the concert on November 30, 1998, and it was later released on VCD.

== Legacy ==
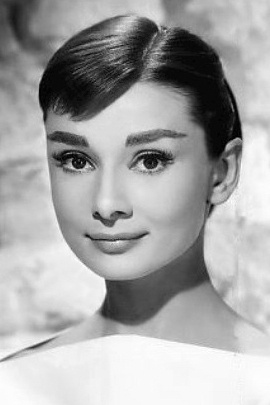
Uhm's presentation during this era was compared to that of British actress Audrey Hepburn.

Invitation continued the stylistic transformations first exhibited by Uhm on her breakthrough single, "Rose of Betrayal". The album cover for Invitation positions Uhm against a red backdrop, peering through green foliage and sporting a straight, middle-part bob. Uhm maintained the hairstyle during promotions for "Poison", which became a trend among Korean women, prompting cosmetologists across the country to study "how to cut short hair well".

Esquire Korea fashion editor Shim Jeong-hee remarked that Uhm cultivated a "luxurious yet youthful" atmosphere reminiscent of the "Hepburn look". In contrast, an "alluring and mysterious" image was introduced for the album's second single, "Invitation", in which Uhm wore her hair long, and performed with a hand fan in black dresses. Kim Ji-soo of Allure Korea came to a similar conclusion, singling out "Invitation" for its "understated [sexiness]" and "Poison" for its more "charismatic" look as two key reinventions in Uhm's career.

In a retrospective article, American music magazine Billboard placed "Invitation" at number 49 in its list of the "98 Greatest Songs of 1998", with writer Tamar Herman noting its "dreamy sensuality" that "[allures] in its breathy vocal delivery and sleek synths". In 2021, the online music service Melon and the newspaper Seoul Shinmun collaborated on a "100 K-pop Masterpieces" special feature, which listed "Invitation" at number 67 as a "foothold" for Uhm's "avant-garde energy and a major source of queer aesthetics tributes". "Invitation" is frequently covered, with notable performances by soloists Ivy, Ga-in, Sunmi, Tiffany Young, actress Lee Sung-kyung, and Park Jin-young himself. The 2014 single "Something" by girl group Girl's Day took influence from both "Invitation" and the similarly JYP-penned "Coming of Age Ceremony" by Park Ji-yoon. "Invitation" was covered and reworked by rapper Miryo, a member of the girl group Brown Eyed Girls, on their seventh studio album Revive (2019). Miryo's version features Uhm Jung-hwa herself.

A short sample of "Poison" appears at the end of American rock band Rage Against the Machine's 1999 single "Sleep Now in the Fire", after it was picked up from a local Korean radio station broadcast by the amplifier of their guitarist, Tom Morello. In 2018, appearing on KBS 2TV's Entertainment Weekly, Uhm picked "Poison" as one of her top seven songs, at second place. She stated that this brief period, starting with "Poison" and ending with 1999's "Molla", were the singles that earned her the most revenue, joking that she stopped receiving any income from her music after that. In 2020, the song was remade by former Bestie member Dahye as her debut solo single. The release featured direct involvement from its original writer, Joo Young-hoon, who re-arranged it in a Latin music style. In 2023, American music magazine Rolling Stone placed "Poison" at number 38 on its list of "100 Greatest Songs in the History of Korean Pop Music", with James Gui naming it "techno-trot’s most iconic anthem".

== Track listing ==
| No. | Title | Lyrics | Music | Arrangement | Length |
|---|---|---|---|---|---|
| 1. | "Again (Never Gonna Give Up)" (다시; Dashi) | Lee Hyun-do | Lee Hyun-do | Lee Hyun-do | 3:50 |
| 2. | "Finding Hidden Image" (숨은 그림 찾기; Sumeun Geurim Chatgi) | Kim Young-ah | Jae Chong, Benson Min | Jae Chong | 3:24 |
| 3. | "Cactus" (선인장; Seoninjang) | Shim Hyun-bo | Jung Jae-hyung | Jung Jae-hyung | 4:51 |
| 4. | "Poison" | Joo Young-hoon | Joo Young-hoon | Joo Young-hoon | 3:44 |
| 5. | "Will Forget You" (널 모를께; Neol Moleulkke) | Park Joo-yeon | Hwang Se-jun | Hwang Se-jun | 4:10 |
| 6. | "Invitation" (초대; Chodae) | Park Jin-young | Park Jin-young | Park Jin-young | 3:54 |
| 7. | "Regrets" (후회; Huhoe) | Cheon Seong-il | Cheon Seong-il | Kim Woo-jin | 3:53 |
| 8. | "Last Favor" (마지막 부탁; Majimag Butag) | Kim Kyung-yeon | Lee Cheol-won | Lee Cheol-won | 4:04 |
| 9. | "Until the Day of Living" (살아있는 그날까지; Sarainneun Geunalkkaji) | Kim Min-jong | Cho Kyu-man | Cho Kyu-man | 4:05 |
| 10. | "Working Girl" | Joo Young-hoon | Joo Young-hoon | Joo Young-hoon | 3:42 |
| 11. | "Tears" (눈물; Nunmul) | Lee Hyun-do | Lee Hyun-do | Lee Hyun-do | 3:57 |
| Total length: | | | | | 43:34 |

== Charts ==
=== Monthly charts ===
| Chart (1998) | Peak position |
|---|---|
| South Korean Albums (MIAK) | 1 |

=== Yearly charts ===
| Chart (1998) | Position |
|---|---|
| South Korean Albums (MIAK) | 13 |
