= 005.1999.06 =

Studio album by Uhm Jung-hwa
- Released: June 17, 1999
- Recorded: 1998–99
- Genre: K-pop, dance
- Length: 42:07
- Language: Korean
- Label: Universal Music Korea, Nuri Entertainment

Uhm Jung-hwa chronology
Invitation (1998)	005.1999.06 (1999)	All Details (1999)

Singles from 005.1999.06
- 1. "I Don't Know" Released: June 17, 1999; 2. "Festival" Released: June 17, 1999

005.1999.06 is the fifth studio album by the South Korean singer and actress Uhm Jung-hwa. It spawned four hit singles and earned Uhm Golden Disk Awards. First released by Universal Music Korea on June 17, 1999, the album explores the dance genre, ranging from 1970s style disco to house dance, and beyond. Uhm worked with various South Korean producers and songwriters on the album, including Kim Chang-hwan, Joo Young-hoon, and Jung Jae-hyung among others.

The album debuted at number one on the South Korean album chart with the first-month sales over 324,000 copies. In December 1999, South Korean newspapers reported that the album had sold over 550,000 copies, and is the sixth best-selling album of the year.

== Reception ==
=== Critical response ===
Reviews for the album have generally been positive. Yang Seong-hui of Munhwa Ilbo said, "Uhm now has an indisputable position in the dance music industry following the success of her songs, 'Poison', 'Invitation', and 'I Don't Know'." However, Park Eun-joo of Hankook Ilbo cited an anonymous source, criticising her for using "too much sex-appeal" but Park also said that Uhm's performances were positively received by the public.

=== Public response ===
This album is the most commercially successful album of Uhm's career to date. Two songs ("I Don't Know", "Festival") from the album topped the charts and she won numerous important music awards in South Korea, including Golden Disk Awards and Mnet Asian Music Awards.

== Track listing ==
CD/Digital download
No.	Title	Lyrics	Music	Length
1.	"I Don't Know" (몰라; Molla)	Kim Chang-hwan	Kim Chang-hwan	3:39
2.	"The Glass Castle" (유리의 성; Yurieui Seong)	Choi Hee-jin	Yoon Il-sang	3:47
3.	"Festival" (페스티벌; Peseutibeol)	Joo Young-hoon	Joo Young-hoon	3:59
4.	"Long Afternoon" (긴 오후; Gin Ohoo, with Jung Jae-hyung)	Uhm Jung-hwa	Jung Jae-hyung	4:19
5.	"The Last Chance" (마지막 기회; Majimak Gihoe)	Park Chang-hak	Yoon Sang	3:17
6.	"Remote Control and Nail Polish" (리모콘과 매니큐어; Rimokongua Maenikuer)	Choi Hee-jin	Yoon Il-sang	3:57
7.	"Scarlet" (스칼렛; Seukalet)	Joo Young-hoon	Joo Young-hoon	3:48
8.	"You, In My Heart" (내 안의 그대; Nae Anui Geudae, featuring Park Jun-hyung of god)	Jo Kyu-man	Jo Kyu-man	3:34
9.	"Forever"	Lee Seung-ho	Lee Kyeong-seop	3:58
10.	"Undevidable Love" (나눌 수 없는 사랑; Nanul Soo Eopneun Sarang)	Kim Hye-seon	Hwang Se-jun	4:07
11.	"Spy"	Yoon Sa-ra	Shin In-soo	3:42
Total length:				42:07

== Accolades ==
=== Awards and nominations ===
Year	Organization	Category	Result	Ref.
1999	Golden Disc Awards	Album Bonsang (Main Prize)	Won	
1999	Golden Disc Awards	Album Daesang (Grand Prize)	Nominated	
1999	KBS Music Awards	Singer of the Year (Youth Division)	Won	
1999	MBC Music Awards	Bonsang (Main Prize)	Won	
1999	Mnet Video Music Awards	Best Female Artist	Won	
1999	Seoul Music Awards	Bonsang (Main Prize)	Won	

=== Music programme awards ===
Song	Programme	Date
"I Don't Know"	The Music Trend (SBS)	July 25, 1999

== Charts ==
=== Monthly charts ===
Chart (June 1999)	Peak position
South Korean Albums (MIAK)	1

=== Yearly charts ===
Chart (1999)	Position
South Korean Albums (MIAK)	6
