= Uhm Jung-hwa =

South Korean singer and actress (born 1969)

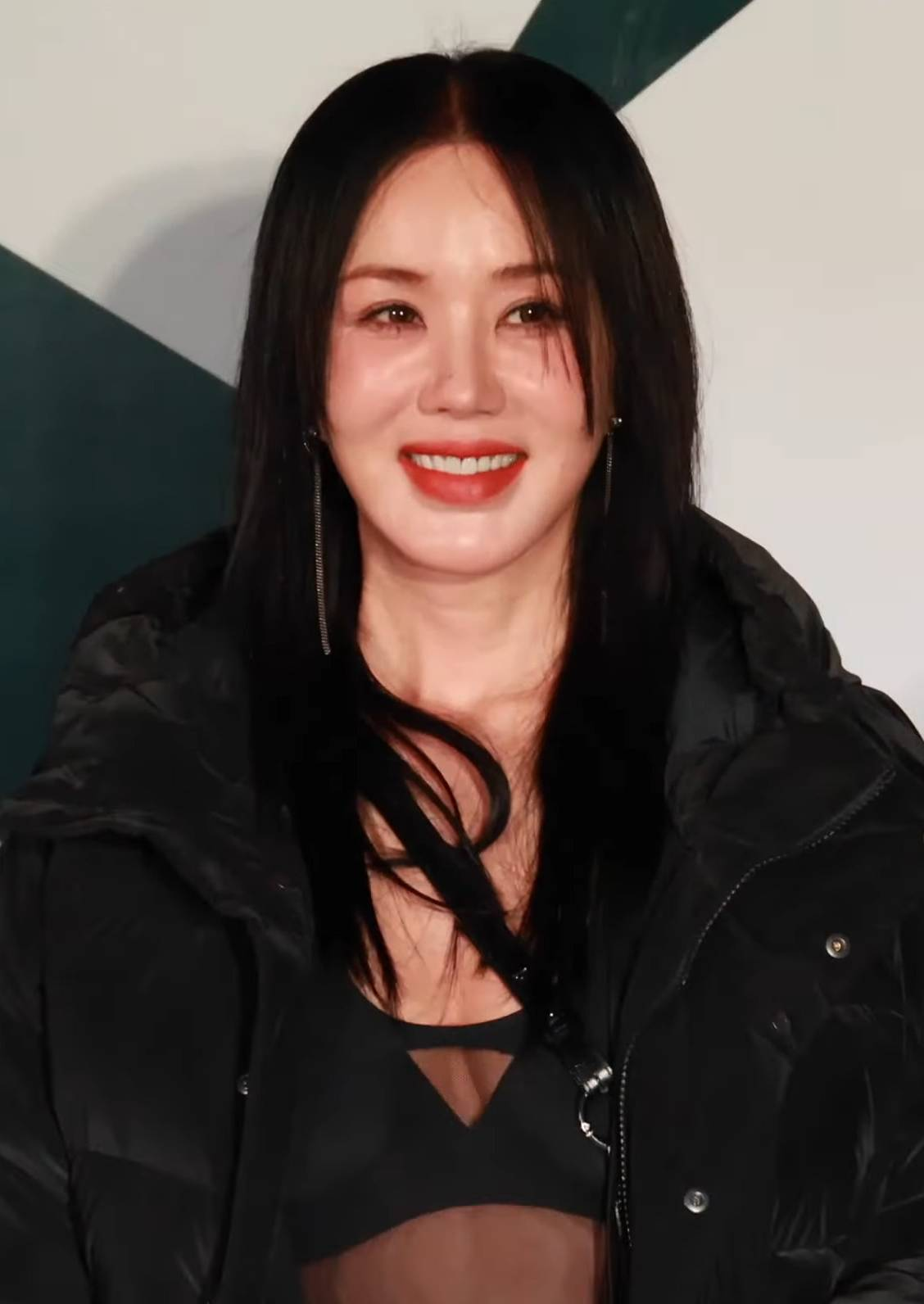
- Uhm in October 2023
- Born: August 17, 1969 (age 57); Chechon, North Chungcheong, South Korea
- Occupations: Singer; actress; designer
- Years active: 1987–present
- Relatives: Uhm Tae-woong (brother)
- Musical career
- Genres: K-pop; dance; electropop
- Labels: Mystic89; KeyEast; Sony BMG; UMG; EMI; YG; Saram
- Formerly of: Refund Sisters
- Website: ilovejunghwa.com

Korean name
- Hangul: 엄정화
- Hanja: 嚴正化
- RR: Eom Jeonghwa
- MR: Ŏm Chŏnghwa

Signature
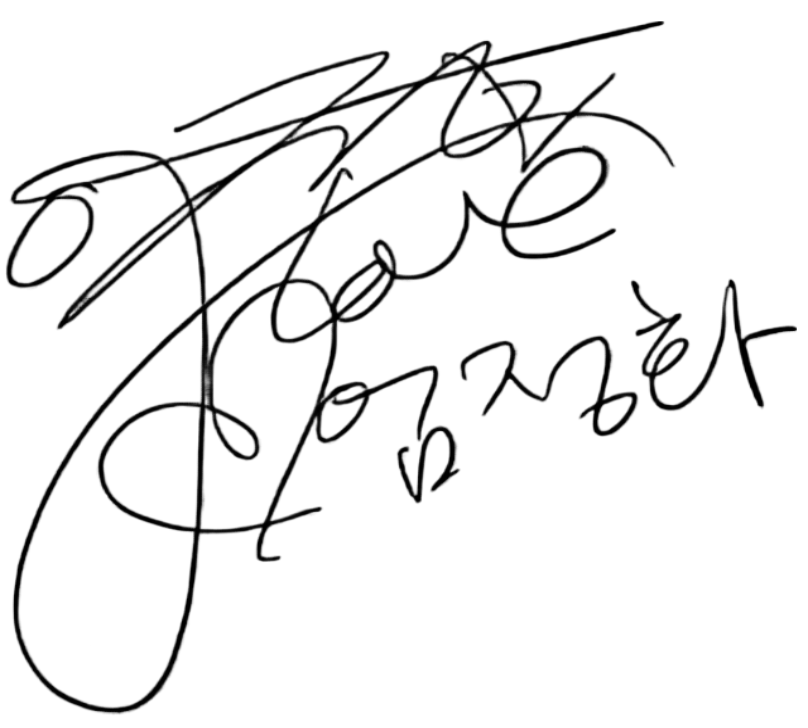

Uhm Jung-hwa (Korean: 엄정화; born August 17, 1969) is a South Korean singer, actress and dancer. Uhm is considered to be one of the most influential women in the Korean entertainment industry, finding success in both music and film. Her legacy and career reinventions have given her the nickname of "Korean Madonna".

Uhm began her career in 1989 as a chorus member for the broadcasting company MBC. She starred in the romantic drama film On a Windy Day, We Must Go to Apgujeong (1993) and released her debut studio album Sorrowful Secret that same year. Though both releases found limited audiences, the album's lead single, "Pupil", helped to establish a sensual image for Uhm.

She pivoted to dance music with the single "Sad Expectation" (1996), and found success with "Rose of Betrayal" (배반의 장미) from her third studio album, After Love (1997). Subsequent album releases Invitation (1998) and 005.1999.06 (1999) were bolstered by a string of hit singles: "Poison", "Invitation", "I Don't Know" (몰라), and "Festival", which gained status as her signature songs.

In 2001, Uhm began to focus on her acting career. Her performance in the erotic comedy Marriage Is a Crazy Thing (2002) won Best Actress at the 39th Baeksang Arts Awards, a category she received another nomination for with Princess Aurora (2006) and won again with Dancing Queen (2012).

Her 2000s musical output saw declining commercial reception but greater appeal with critics. Uhm began experimenting with electronica on Self Control (2004), and funk on Prestige (2006), the latter of which won Best Dance and Electronic Album at the 4th Korean Music Awards. In 2008, she experienced a commercial resurgence with the single "D.I.S.C.O". Following a nearly decade-long hiatus from music, she released her tenth studio album The Cloud Dream of the Nine in 2017.

== Biography ==
=== Early life ===
Uhm Jung-hwa, born on August 17, 1969, in Jecheon, Chungcheongbuk-do, South Korea, is the second of four children to her father, Uhm Jin-ok, and mother, Yoo Kyung-sook. Her siblings include an older sister, Uhm Jung-hye, a younger sister, Uhm Jung-sun, and a younger brother, the actor Uhm Tae-woong. Her father, a trumpet player and middle school music teacher who majored in music at Seorabol College of Arts, died in a motorcycle accident in 1974. Following his death, the family faced a difficult financial situation, with Uhm even having to live in a school cafeteria dormitory.

She graduated from Cheongjeon Elementary School and Uirim Girls' Middle School in Jecheon. She then attended Jecheon Girls' High School before transferring to Bukwon Girls' High School in Wonju, Gangwon-do, from which she graduated in 1989. Uhm recalled traveling to Seoul during her high school years to attend a Deulgukhwa concert. She became well-known for her singing skills after transferring to Bukwon Girls' High School. Her friends would line up to request songs from her during school picnics and talent shows.

After high school, Uhm moved to Seoul, where she worked part-time at a café while her mother ran a street food stall selling tteokbokki and fish cakes. In 1989, she passed audition for the MBC Chorus, beginning her career as a member of its 12th class. Uhm revealed that she was initially rejected because the formal recruitment process only hired college graduates. However, she was later able to join through a special recruitment. During this period, she also worked part-time as a chorus member at the Holiday Inn Seoul, which was operated by Lee Joo-il. While in the MBC Chorus, she made connections in the entertainment industry, including with Yang Hyun-suk.

=== Music career ===
==== 1990s ====
Uhm Jung-hwa officially debuted as a singer in 1993 with her first studio album Sorrowful Secret. By the mid-90s she established herself as one of the top Korean female singers and entertainers, with a series of hit singles: "Sad Expectation" (슬픈 기대), "A Love Only Heaven Permits" (하늘만 허락한 사랑), "Rose of Betrayal" (배반의 장미), and "Tell Me" (말해 줘).

Uhm's fourth studio album, Invitation, introduced a new mature side of the singer. The music video for its title track caused a lot of controversy due to its suggestive nature. Invitation quickly became one of the highest selling albums of the year and received positive reviews from critics and fans.

She released two of her most recognizable singles of her career, "Poison" and "Invitation" (초대). She remained successful the following year, in 1999, with her fifth studio album 005.1999.06.

As of 2020 she currently released ten studio albums, two compilation albums and one extended play.

==== 2000s–present ====
During the 2000s, Uhm began to focus more on her acting career and committed herself to taking a variety of acting roles. She also began to pursue and experiment with different musical genres, in particular electronica. In 2004, she released her double album Self Control, which featured songs composed by Jung Jae-hyung, Fractal and Roller Coaster. Music critics praised Uhm for her ability to reinvent her image and sound.

After a two-year break from the music scene, she released her ninth studio album Prestige. Throughout the year she released two singles, "Come 2 Me" and "Song of the Wind" (바람의 노래), each enjoyed positive critical reception. In early 2007, she won a Korean Music Award for Best Electronic Dance Record.

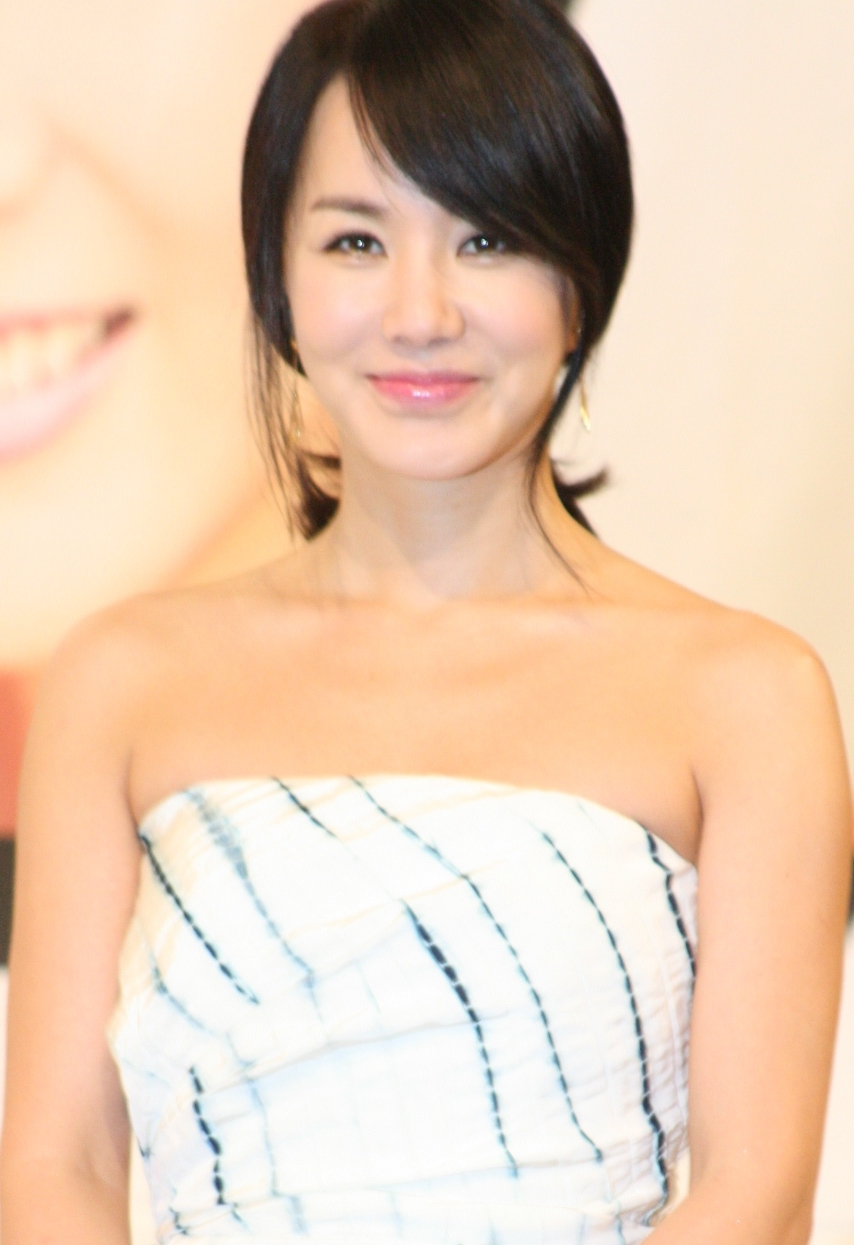
Uhm in 2009

In the summer of 2008, she released her first EP titled D.I.S.C.O with help from her longtime friend Yang Hyun-suk of YG Entertainment. The lead single "D.I.S.C.O" featured T.O.P, a member from the popular boy band Big Bang. The EP was one of the best-selling albums by a female artist in 2008, and was further promoted by the digital single "D.I.S.C.O Part 2" which was a remix version of "D.I.S.C.O" and featured G-Dragon, the leader of BigBang.

After an eight-year-long hiatus Uhm announced that she would be releasing her first new album since D.I.S.C.O in 2008, the album title would be The Cloud Dream of the Nine. She revealed that she would be releasing the album in two parts, the first part would be released on December 27, 2017, and the second part at a later date. Uhm performed the title tracks "Watch Me Move" and "Dreamer" on Gayo Daejeon along with "D.I.S.C.O", she would also perform the two tracks on MCountdown on the January 5. One year after the release of Part 1, Uhm revealed through her Instagram account that she was in the preparation stage of her comeback with part 2 of The Cloud Dream of the Nine.

In the summer of 2020, Uhm joined with singers Lee Hyori, Jessi, and Hwasa to form the "supergroup" Refund Sisters. Their first single, "Don't Touch Me" debuted in October 2020, and reached #1 on the Gaon chart.

=== Acting career ===
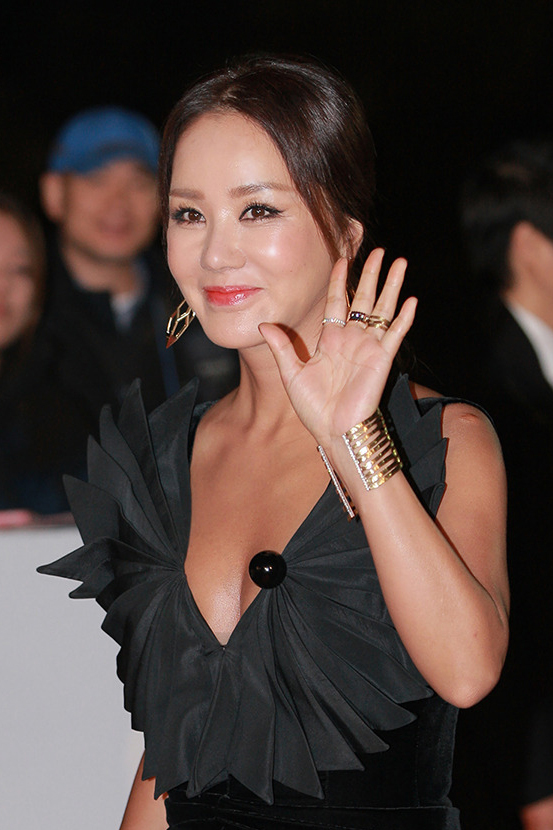
Uhm at the 34th Blue Dragon Film Awards in 2013

Uhm has established herself as one of South Korea's top actresses. She is known for her roles in the films Marriage Is a Crazy Thing (2002), Singles (2003), Princess Aurora (2005), Seducing Mr. Perfect (2006),Tidal Wave (2009) and Dancing Queen (2012) which became one of the highest-grossing movies in Korea. She has won two Baeksang Arts Awards for Best Actress, in 2002 for Marriage is a Crazy Thing and again in 2012 for Dancing Queen.

In 2022, Uhm is back on the small screen with the tvN drama Our Blues, which is their comeback on the small screen in 5 years since 2017.

=== Fashion line ===
Uhm launched her new clothing and lingerie line, "Corner Suite" and "ZHUM in New York", which made $10M USD within three months of its release. "Corner Suite" became an instant hit when the line debuted on online markets, which immediately sold out, and putting the line with more home shopping channels as for its demand.

== Personal life ==
=== Health ===
Uhm was diagnosed with thyroid cancer but fully recovered after surgery in May 2010. Uhm said she felt a little afraid leading up to the surgery, but rather than being discouraged by the pain she was experiencing, she made up her mind to dedicate herself to helping others by inspiring them. "I want to use my talent and influence in a meaningful way", she said.

== Image and impact ==
Artists who have cited Uhm as an influence or role model include BoA, Lee Hyori, Baek Ji-young, Sandara Park, Tiffany Young, Jung Eun-chae, Son Dam-bi, Kim Yoon-ji, Dal Shabet's Ah Young, Laboum's Solbin, and Apink's Park Cho-rong.

In 2021, she was selected as Jury member for Actor and Actress of the Year Award in 26th Busan International Film Festival held in October.

She also has been known to be called "The Queen of Charisma" and is also considered to be a sex symbol.

== Discography ==
=== Studio albums ===
Title	Album details	Peak chart positions	Sales
Title	Album details	KOR	Sales
Sorrowful Secret	Released: July 1993; Label: Samsung; Formats: LP, CD, cassette; Track listing: 1. Sad Secret (슬픈비밀); 2. Like All the Lovers in the World (세상모든연인들 처럼); 3. Urban Mosaic (도시모자이크); 4. If I'm In Your Heart (너의마음속에 내가있다면); 5. Pupil (눈동자); 6. Another Me (또다른 나); 7. Don't Think You're Alone (혼자란 생각하지마); 8. Your Tired Face (지쳐 버린 네모습)	—N/a	—N/a
Uhm Jung Hwa 2	Released: January 1996; Label: Samsung; Formats: CD, cassette; Track listing: 1. Love Conflict (사랑 갈등); 2. A Love Only Heaven Permits (하늘만 허락한 사랑); 3. Sad Expectations (슬픈기대); 4. Causal Retribution (인과응보); 5. Secret Meeting (밀회)"; 6. A Prima Donna's Love (프리마돈나의 사랑); 7. Last Temptation (마지막유혹); 8. Love Has No Borders (사랑에는 국경이 없지 않다); 9. Reply (대답)	—N/a	—N/a
After Love (후애)(後愛)	Released: March 1997; Label: E&E Media; Formats: CD, cassette	—N/a	—N/a
Invitation	Released: August 6, 1998; Label: Nuri Entertainment; Formats: CD, cassette	—N/a	KOR: 458,147
005.1999.06	Released: June 17, 1999; Label: Nuri Entertainment; Formats: CD, cassette	1	KOR: 552,373
Queen of Charisma	Released: November 1, 2000; Label: EMI; Formats: CD, cassette; Track listing: 1. Come On; 2. Gap; 3. Escape; 4. Time Goes By; 5. Sad Delusion; 6. Pleasure; 7. Maria; 8. When You Were By My Side; 9. Game; 10. Fantasy; 11. War Of Roses; 12. It's A Goodbye; 13. Falling; 14. Baby Baby Tell Me	3	KOR: 238,801
Hwa (화)	Released: October 30, 2001; Label: Istar Entertainment; Formats: CD, cassette	5	KOR: 196,063
Self Control	Released: February 17, 2004; Label: YBM Seoul Records; Formats: CD, cassette, digital download	3	KOR: 37,218
Prestige	Released: October 26, 2006; Label: Sony BMG; Formats: CD, cassette, digital download; Track listing: 1. Friday Night; 2. Shining Star; 3. Come 2 Me; 4. Gammer; 5. 거칠게..로멘틱하게 (Roughly...Romantically); 6. 바림의 노래 (Varim's Song); 7. 탐 8. Dance with Me; 9. Ticket to the Moon; 10. 1996 년 10월 16일 날씨 맑음; 11. 여왕 폐하의 순정; 12. Innocence; 13. 사랑해 사랑해	17	KOR: 7,456
The Cloud Dream of the Nine	Released: December 26, 2017; Label: Mystic Entertainment; Formats: CD, digital download, streaming	22	—N/a

=== Compilation albums ===
Title	Album details	Peak chart positions	Sales
Title	Album details	KOR	Sales
Best...My Songs	Released: September 19, 1998; Label: E&E Media; Formats: CD, cassette	—N/a	KOR: 31,581
All Details	Released: December 28, 1999; Label: Nuri Entertainment; Formats: CD, cassette	10	KOR: 146,587

=== Extended plays ===
Title	Album details	Peak chart positions	Sales
Title	Album details	KOR	Sales
D.I.S.C.O	Released: June 30, 2008; Label: YG Entertainment; Formats: CD, digital download, streaming	18	KOR: 7,693

=== Singles ===
Title	Year	Peak chart positions	Album
Title	Year	KOR	Album
"Pupil" (눈동자)	1993	—	Sorrowful Secret
"Sad Expectation" (슬픈기대)	1996	—	Uhm Jung Hwa 2
"A Love Only Heaven Permits" (하늘만 허락한 사랑)	1996	—	Uhm Jung Hwa 2
"Rose of Betrayal" (배반의 장미)	1997	70	After Love
"After Love" (후애 (後愛))	1997	—	After Love
"Poison"	1998	7	Invitation
"Invitation" (초대)	1998	19	Invitation
"I Don't Know" (몰라)	1999	—	005.1999.06
"Festival"	1999	—	005.1999.06
"Cross" (크로스)	1999	—	All Details
"Escape"	2000	—	Queen of Charisma
"Crack" (틈)	2000	—	Queen of Charisma
"All Go Away" (다가라)	2001	—	Hwa
"Eternity"	2004	—	Self Control
"Invitation" (tvN Remix) (초대 tvN Remix)	2006	—	Non-album single
"Come 2 Me"	2006	—	Prestige
"Come 2 Me" (New Remix)	2006	—	Non-album single
"D.I.S.C.O" feat. T.O.P	2008	—	D.I.S.C.O
"D.I.S.C.O Part 2" feat. G-Dragon	2008	—	Non-album single
"Watch Me Move"	2016	—	The Cloud Dream Of The Nine
"Dreamer"	2016	70	The Cloud Dream Of The Nine
"Ending Credit"	2017	87	The Cloud Dream Of The Nine
"She"	2017	—	The Cloud Dream Of The Nine
"Hop in" (호피무늬) feat. Hwasa, DPR Live	2020	— (Note: "Hop in" did not enter Gaon Digital Chart, but peaked at number 59 on the component Gaon Download Chart.)	Non-album single
Peak chart positions are from the Gaon Digital Chart, which was established in 2010.

=== OSTs ===
Title	Year	Album
"Pupil" (눈동자)	1993	On a Windy Day, We Should Go To Apkujeong Dong OST
"Luxury good" (럭셔리 굳)	2002	Boss X File OST
"Narration"	2003	Wife OST
"Recipe" (레시피)	2009	He Who Can't Marry OST
"Call My Name" with Dancing Queens	2012	Dancing Queen OST
"Second Chance" with Dancing Queens feat. Cheetah	2012	Dancing Queen OST
"Let Me Cry"	2017	You Are Too Much OST
"Who am I?" (나는 누구?) feat. Duk Bae	2017	You Are Too Much OST
"Emerald" (에메랄드)	2017	You Are Too Much OST

=== Other appearances ===
Title	Year	Album
"Last Winter" Kim Jang-hoon feat. Uhm Jung-hwa	2000	Innocence
"October - As always" (10월 October - 늘 그렇듯)	2001	ZOY Project 1st
"My love, crybaby" (내사랑 울보)	2002	Jeon Yeong-Rok's 30th Anniversary Dedication Album "Legend"
"Sad Christmas" Lee Jae-hoon feat. Leessang, Uhm Jung-hwa	2005	White winter 2005
"Love is" (사랑이란)	2008	Song Book
"Time passes with you (Original Ver.)" (시간은 그대와 흘러 (Original Ver.)) Jung Jae-hyung feat. Lucid Fall, Uhm Jung-hwa	2009	Promenade

== Filmography ==
=== Film ===
Year	Title	Role	Notes	Ref.
1992	Marriage Story	Disc Jockey		
1993	On a Windy Day We Must Go to Apgujeong	Oh Hye-jin		
1994	Blue Seagull	Joshua	voice	
1994	How to Top My Wife	Manula jugigi		
2002	Marriage Is a Crazy Thing	Yeon-hee		
2003	Singles	Dong-mi		
2004	Mr. Handy, Mr. Hong	Yoon Hye-jin		
2005	All for Love	Hur Yu-jung		
2005	Princess Aurora	Jung Soon-jung		
2006	For Horowitz	Kim Ji-soo		
2006	Seducing Mr. Perfect	Min-june		
2007	Love Now	Seo Yu-na		
2009	Insadong Scandal	Bae Tae-jin		
2009	Tidal Wave	Yoo-jin		
2009	Five Senses of Eros	Lee Jung-ha		
2010	Bestseller	Baek Hee-soo		
2011	Mama	Dong-sook		
2012	Dancing Queen	Herself		
2013	In My End Is My Beginning	Lee Jung-ha		
2013	Montage	Ha-kyung		
2014	Venus Talk	Jung Shin-hye		
2015	Wonderful Nightmare	Lee Yeon-woo		
2020	Okay! Madam	Lee Mi-young / Gwi-sun		
2023	Miss Fortune	Lee Ji-hye		
2026	Okay! Madam 2	Lee Mi-young / Gwi-sun		

=== Television series ===
Year	Title	Role	Notes	Ref.
1990	Sarang			
1992	The Wild			
1993	Good Morning Youngdong			
1993	Sisters			
1994	The Rich People Also Cry			
1994	Police			
1994	Close One Eye			
1994	Mystery Melodrama			
1995	Human Theater			
1995	Angel Inside the Mask			
1995	Remember to Love			
1996	Intimacy Between Father and Son			
1997	Park Bit-na			
1997	Star			
1997	Beautiful Sin	Areumdawoon Joe		
2003	Wife	Ahnae		
2004	Tropical Nights in December			
2007	Get Karl! Oh Soo-jung	Oh Soo-jung		
2009	He Who Can't Marry	Jang Moon-jung		
2014	A Witch's Love	Ban Ji-yeon		
2017	You Are Too Much	Yoo Ji-na / Kim Hye-jung		
2022	Our Blues	Go Mi-ran		
2023	Doctor Cha	Cha Jeong-suk		
2025	My Troublesome Star	Im Sera / Bong Cheong-ja		

=== Television shows ===
Year	Title	Role	Notes	Ref.
2020	Hangout with Yoo	Cast Member	Episode 56–68	
2021	On & Off	Cast Member	Season 2	
2023	Dancing Queens on the Road	Cast Member		

== Stage ==
=== Theatre ===
List of Theater Play(s)
Year	Title	Role	Notes	Ref.
1997	Taxi Driver – Where Are You Going? (택시 드리벌 - 당신은 어디까지 가십니까?)	Hwa-yi		

== Accolades ==
=== Awards and nominations ===
Name of the award ceremony, year presented, category, nominee of the award, and the result of the nomination
Award ceremony	Year	Category	Nominee / Work	Result	Ref.
APAN Star Awards	2023	Top Excellence Award, Actress in a Miniseries	Doctor Cha	Won	
Baeksang Arts Awards	1993	Best New Actress – Film	On a Windy Day We Must Go to Apgujeong	Nominated	
Baeksang Arts Awards	2003	Best Actress – Film	Marriage Is a Crazy Thing	Won	
Baeksang Arts Awards	2006	Best Actress – Film	Princess Aurora	Nominated	
Baeksang Arts Awards	2006	Instyle Fashion Award	Uhm Jung-hwa	Won	
Baeksang Arts Awards	2012	Best Actress – Film	Dancing Queen	Won	
Baeksang Arts Awards	2024	Best Actress – Television	Doctor Cha	Nominated	
Blue Dragon Film Awards	1995	Best Supporting Actress	How to Top My Wife	Nominated	
Blue Dragon Film Awards	2006	Best Actress	For Horowitz	Nominated	
Blue Dragon Film Awards	2012	Best Actress	Dancing Queen	Nominated	
Blue Dragon Film Awards	2013	Best Actress	Montage	Nominated	
Busan Film Critics Awards	2006	Best Actress	Princess Aurora	Won	
Chunsa Film Art Awards	2010	Best Actress	Bestseller	Won	
Chunsa Film Art Awards	2014	Best Actress	Montage	Nominated	
CJENM Visionary Awards (Note: Visionary Awards, which started in 2020, selects and awards people who lead roles in the Korean entertainment industry. It highlights the meaning and achievements of a person whose chosen trend keywords penetrated the entertainment industry, including broadcasting, movies, music, and performances, and presents the next vision of the cultural sector with outstanding achievements and influence.)	2024	2024 Visionary	Uhm Jung-hwa	Won	
Donga TV Fashion Beauty Award	2006	Fashion Icon	Uhm Jung-hwa	Won	
Gala Dinner Party sponsored by FKCCI	2007	Friendship Award	Uhm Jung-hwa	Won	
Golden Cinematography Awards	1993	Best Supporting Actress	On a Windy Day We Must Go to Apgujeong	Won	
Golden Cinematography Awards	2004	Special Award	Mr. Handy	Won	
Golden Disc Awards	1998	Bonsang Award (Song Division)	"Poison"	Won	
Golden Disc Awards	1999	Bonsang Award (Song Division)	"I Don't Know"	Won	
Golden Disc Awards	2000	Bonsang Award (Song Division)	"Escape"	Won	
Grand Bell Awards	1993	Best New Actress	On a Windy Day We Must Go to Apgujeong	Nominated	
Grand Bell Awards	2007	Best Actress	For Horowitz	Nominated	
Grand Bell Awards	2009	Best Supporting Actress	Tidal Wave	Nominated	
Grand Bell Awards	2012	Best Actress	Dancing Queen	Nominated	
Grand Bell Awards	2013	Best Actress	Montage	Won	
Grand Bell Awards	2015	Best Actress	Wonderful Nightmare	Nominated	
Jecheon International Music and Film Festival	2021	JIMFFACE	Uhm Jung-hwa	Won	
KBS Drama Awards	2003	Excellence Award, Actress	Wife	Won	
KBS Drama Awards	2009	Excellence Award, Actress in a Miniseries	He Who Can't Marry	Nominated	
KBS Song Festival	2001	Main Prize	Uhm Jung-hwa	Won	
Korean Culture Entertainment Awards	2013	Best Actress	Montage	Won	
Korean Film Actors Association	2013	Popular Film Star Award	Montage	Won	
Korean Film Awards	2006	Best Actress	For Horowitz	Nominated	
Korean Music Awards	2007	Best Electronic Dance Album	Prestige	Won	
MBC Drama Awards	2004	Top Excellence Award, Actress	Tropical Nights in December	Nominated	
MBC Drama Awards	2017	Grand Prize (Daesang)	You Are Too Much	Nominated	
MBC Drama Awards	2017	Top Excellence Award, Actress in a Weekend Drama	You Are Too Much	Nominated	
MBC Entertainment Awards	2020	Excellence Award in Music/Talk Category – Female	Hangout with Yoo	Won	
MBC Gayo Daejejeon	2001	30-years-old and Above Award	Uhm Jung-hwa	Won	
Mnet Asian Music Awards	1999	Best Female Artist	"I Don't Know"	Won	
Mnet Asian Music Awards	1999	Best Dance Performance	"I Don't Know"	Nominated	
Mnet Asian Music Awards	2000	Best Female Artist	"Cross"	Nominated	
Mnet Asian Music Awards	2001	Best Female Artist	"Crack"	Nominated	
Mnet Asian Music Awards	2008	Best Female Artist	"Disco" ft. T.O.P	Nominated	
Mnet Asian Music Awards	2008	Best House & Electronic	"Disco" ft. T.O.P	Nominated	
Mnet Asian Music Awards	2008	Best Music Video	"Disco" ft. T.O.P	Nominated	
SBS Drama Awards	2007	Excellence Award, Actress in a Miniseries	Get Karl! Oh Soo-jung	Nominated	
SBS Gayo Daejeon	2000	Main Prize	Uhm Jung-hwa	Won	
SBS Gayo Daejeon	2001	Main Prize	Uhm Jung-hwa	Won	

=== Listicles ===
Name of publisher, year listed, name of listicle, and placement
Publisher	Year	Listicle	Rank	Ref.
Forbes	2024	Korea Power Celebrity 40	23rd	
The Screen	2019	2009–2019 Top Box Office Powerhouse Actors in Korean Movies	25th	
