= Younha discography =

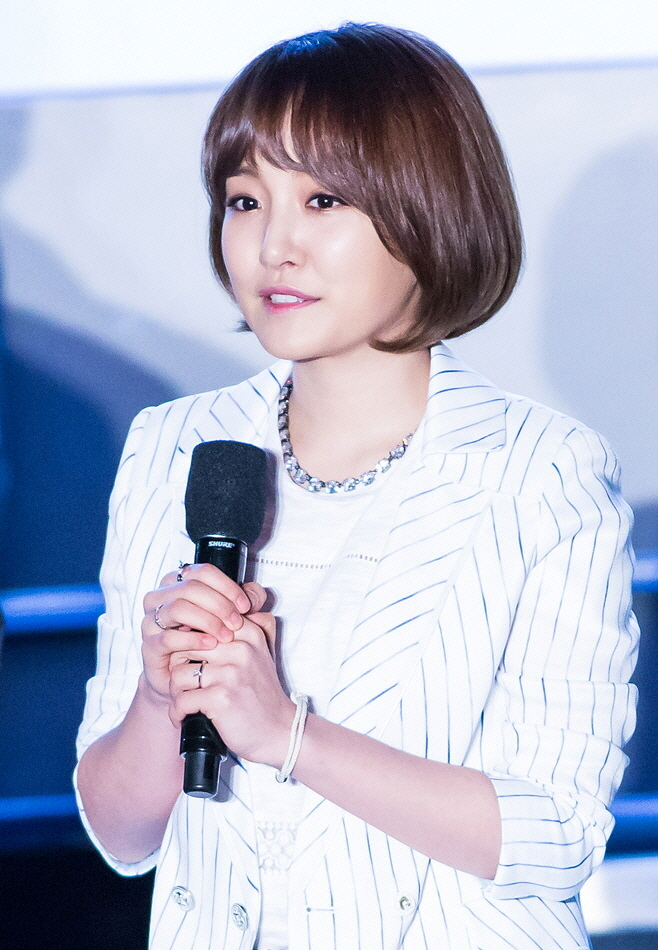
- Younha at the Spring Wind Concert in September 2015
- Studio albums: 13
- Extended plays: 5
- Compilation albums: 1
- Singles: 40

This is the discography of Korean singer Younha, active in both South Korea and Japan, which consists of thirteen studio albums, five extended plays, one compilation album, and twenty-four singles.

== Albums ==
=== Japanese studio albums ===
Title	Album details	Peak chart positions		Sales
Title	Album details	KOR	JPN	Sales
Go! Younha	Released: October 5, 2005; Label: Epic Records; Format: CD	—	13	JPN: 20,000
Hitotsu Sora no Shita	Released: September 22, 2010; Label: Sistus Records; Formats: CD, digital download	56	169	
People	Released: September 10, 2014; Label: MEPLUS Entertainment, Universal; Formats: CD, digital download	—	—	
View	Released: September 9, 2015; Label: MEPLUS Entertainment, Universal; Formats: CD, digital download	—	—	

=== Korean studio albums ===
Title	Album details	Peak chart positions	Sales
Title	Album details	KOR	Sales
The Perfect Day to Say I Love You	Released: March 15, 2007; Repackaged: June 26, 2007; Label: Stam Entertainment; Formats: CD, digital download	— (Note: The Perfect Day to Say I Love You peaked at number 5 on the Music Industry Association of Korea's monthly album sales chart for March 2007.)	KOR: 45,000
Comet	Released: October 23, 2007; Label: Stam Entertainment; Formats: CD, digital download	67 (Note: Comet peaked at number 11 on the Music Industry Association of Korea's monthly album sales chart for December 2007.)	KOR: 38,000
Someday	Released: August 28, 2008; Label: Stam Entertainment; Formats: CD, digital download	— (Note: Someday peaked at number 6 on the Music Industry Association of Korea's monthly album sales chart for August 2008.)	KOR: 55,000
Peace, Love & Ice Cream	Released: April 16, 2009; Label: Lion Media; Formats: CD, digital download	70	KOR: 58,969
Growing Season	Released: December 11, 2009; Label: Lion Media; Formats: CD, digital download	3	KOR: 47,630
Supersonic	Released: July 3, 2012; Label: ANG / Wealive; Formats: CD, digital download, streaming	2	KOR: 15,110
RescuE	Released: December 27, 2017; Label: LOEN Entertainment; Formats: CD, digital download, streaming	6	KOR: 7,367
End Theory	Released: November 16, 2021; End Theory: Final Edition: March 30, 2022; Label: C9 Entertainment; Formats: CD, digital download, streaming	15	KOR: 15,273
Mindset	Released: May 10, 2023; Label: C9 Entertainment; Formats: CD, digital download, streaming	19	KOR: 11,327
Growth Theory	Released: September 1, 2024; Growth Theory: Final Edition: November 14, 2024; Label: C9 Entertainment; Formats: CD, digital download, streaming	19	KOR: 36,984
"—" denotes releases that did not chart or were not released in that region.

=== Remake albums ===
Title	Album details	Peak chart positions	Sales
Title	Album details	KOR	Sales
Sub Character (리메이크 앨범 '써브캐릭터 원')	Released: March 9, 2026; Label: C9 Entertainment; Format: CD, digital download, streaming; Track listing: 1. "계절범죄 (Seasonal Crime)" orig. 미로 (Miiro); 2. "써브캐릭터 (Sub Character)" orig. 위즈 (wizu); 3. "염라 (Karma)" orig. 달의하루 (Dareharu); 4. " 스카이바운드 (Skybound)" orig. 카디 (Kardi)	10	KOR: 11,555

=== Compilation albums ===
Title	Album details	Peak chart positions	Sales
Title	Album details	JPN	Sales
Songs – Teen's Collection	Released: March 26, 2008 (JPN); Label: Epic; Format: CD/DVD	152	JPN: 1,300

== Extended plays ==
Title	Details	Peak chart positions	Sales
Title	Details	KOR	Sales
Lost in Love	Released: December 9, 2010 (KOR); Label: KT Music; Format: CD, digital download	3	KOR: 15,000
Just Listen	Released: May 2, 2013 (KOR); Label: ANG, Wealive; Format: CD, digital download	5	KOR: 7,302
Subsonic	Released: December 6, 2013 (KOR); Label: ANG, Wealive; Format: CD, digital download	5	KOR: 9,605
Stable Mindset	Released: July 3, 2019 (KOR); Label: C9 Entertainment; Format: CD, digital download	18	KOR: 4,545
Unstable Mindset	Released: January 6, 2020 (KOR); Label: C9 Entertainment; Format: CD, digital download	12	KOR: 6,699

== Singles ==
=== Japanese singles ===
Title	Year	Peak chart positions	Album
Title	Year	JPN	Album
"Yubikiri" (ゆびきり)	2004	—	Go! Younha
"Hōkiboshi" (ほうき星)	2005	15	Go! Younha
"Motto Futari de" (もっとふたりで)	2005	113	Go! Younha
"Touch" / "Yume no Tsuzuki" (タッチ/夢の続き)	2005	14	Go! Younha
"My Lover" (マイ☆ラバ)	2005	58	Go! Younha
"Te o Tsunaide" (手をつないで)	2006	50	Songs - Teen's Collection
"Ima ga Daisuki" (今が大好き)	2006	71	Songs - Teen's Collection
"Hakanaku Tsuyoku" (儚く強く)	2007	36	Songs - Teen's Collection
"Girl"	2009	175	Hitotsu Sora no Shita
"Sukinanda" (好きなんだ)	2009	154	Hitotsu Sora no Shita

=== Korean singles ===
Title	Year	Peak chart positions		Sales	Certifications (Note: In April 2018, Gaon Chart introduced music recording certifications for albums, downloads and streamings.)	Album
Title	Year	KOR	KOR Hot	Sales	Certifications	Album
"Promise" (약속)	2004	*	*	—N/a	—N/a	Comet (Note: The original title for the song was the Japanese counterpart untranslated; as "Yubikiri", however, it was re-recorded and remastered in 2007, and this is the version that appears on the Comet album.)
"Audition (Time2Rock)"	2006	*	*	—N/a	—N/a	Non-album single
"Password 486" (비밀번호 486)	2007	*	*	—N/a	—N/a	The Perfect Day to Say I Love You
"Love Condition" (연애조건)	2007	*	*	—N/a	—N/a	The Perfect Day to Say I Love You
"Comet" (혜성)	2007	*	*	—N/a	—N/a	Comet
"At First Sight" (첫눈에)	2007	*	*	—N/a	—N/a	Comet
"Telepathy" (텔레파시)	2008	*	*	—N/a	—N/a	Someday
"Gossip Boy"	2008	*	*	—N/a	—N/a	Someday
"1, 2, 3" (원투쓰리)	2009	*	*	—N/a	—N/a	Peace, Love & Ice Cream
"Broke Up Today" (오늘 헤어졌어요)	2009	7	*	KOR: 1,794,719	—N/a	Growing Season
"One Shot" (featuring Juseok)	2010	21	*	—N/a	—N/a	Lost in Love
"Take Care of My Boyfriend" (내 남자친구를 부탁해)	2010	10	*	KOR: 400,000	—N/a	Lost in Love
"It's Beautiful"	2011	31	*	KOR: 206,734	—N/a	Non-album single
"Would We Have Changed?" (우린 달라졌을까) (with John Park)	2012	17	10	KOR: 614,313	—N/a	Supersonic
"Run"	2012	25	34	KOR: 234,204	—N/a	Supersonic
"Unacceptable" (아니야)	2013	3	6	KOR: 459,978	—N/a	Just Listen
"The Real Reason Why We Broke Up" (우리가 헤어진 진짜 이유)	2013	10	8	KOR: 763,543	—N/a	Just Listen
"Please Tell Me" (괜찮다)	2013	9	7	KOR: 288,954	—N/a	Subsonic
"Nothing" (없어)	2013	13	11	KOR: 250,206	—N/a	Subsonic
"Umbrella" (우산)	2014	1	1	KOR: 703,379	—N/a	Non-album singles
"Wasted" (내 마음이 뭐가 돼)	2014	8	*	KOR: 763,543	—N/a	Non-album singles
"Thinking About You" (널 생각해) (produced by Lee Chan-hyuk of AKMU)	2015	13	*	KOR: 80,153	—N/a	Non-album singles
"Hashtag" (허세) (produced by Tablo)	2015	29	*	KOR: 69,302	—N/a	Non-album singles
"Get It?" (알아듣겠지) (featuring Ha:tfelt, Cheetah)	2016	39	*	KOR: 48,778	—N/a	Non-album singles
"Take Five"	2017	—	*	—N/a	—N/a	Non-album singles
"Hello" (종이비행기) (featuring pH-1)	2017	17	39	KOR: 80,153	—N/a	RescuE
"Parade"	2017	59	—	KOR: 34,925	—N/a	RescuE
"Snail Mail" (느린 우체통)	2018	85	—	—N/a	—N/a	Non-album single
"On a Rainy Day" (비가 내리는 날에는)	2019	16	14	—N/a	—N/a	Stable Mindset
"Dark Cloud" (먹구름)	2020	23	20	—N/a	—N/a	Unstable Mindset
"Stardust" (별의 조각)	2021	104	46	—N/a	—N/a	End Theory
"Event Horizon" (사건의 지평선)	2022	1	1	—N/a	KMCA: Platinum	End Theory: Final Edition
"Rain Song" (비 오는 날 듣기 좋은 노래)	2022	150	*	—N/a	—N/a	Non-album single
"Kaze" (바람)	2023	121	*	—N/a	—N/a	Mindset
"Waiting" (20th Anniversary Edition) (기다리다 (20th Anniversary Edition))	2023	—	*	—N/a	—N/a	Younha 20th Anniversary Digital Single 'Waiting'
"Mangrove Tree" (맹그로브)	2024	198	*	—N/a	—N/a	Growth Theory
"Sunfish" (태양물고기)	2024	48	*	—N/a	—N/a	Growth Theory
"Point Nemo" (포인트 니모)	2024	—	*	—N/a	—N/a	Growth Theory: Final Edition
"Seasonal Crime" (계절범죄)	2026	124	—	—N/a	—N/a	TBA
"—" denotes releases that did not chart or were not released in that region. "*" denotes a chart did not exist at that time.

=== As featured artist ===
Title	Year	Peak chart positions		Sales	Album
Title	Year	KOR	KOR Hot	Sales	Album
"Soothing Touch" (만져주기) (Wheesung featuring Younha)	2007	*	*	—N/a	Eternal Essence of Music
"Today Seoul's Skies Are Sunny All Day Long" (오늘 서울 하늘은 하루종일 맑음) (Toy featuring Younha)	2007	*	*	—N/a	Thank You
"Umbrella" (우산) (Epik High featuring Younha)	2008	*	95	—N/a	Pieces, Part One
"Paparazzi" (파파라치) (Ajoo featuring Younha, Taewan a.k.a. C-Luv)	2008	*	*	—N/a	Paparazzi
"Tug of War" (줄다리기) (Kim Bum-soo featuring Younha)	2008	*	*	—N/a	6th
"Promise" (약속) (Kim Dong-wan duet with Younha)	2008	*	*	—N/a	Promise
"Painful Days of Love" (사랑에 아파한 날들) (Yim Jae-beom duet with Younha)	2011	6	*	—N/a	Non-album singles
"Dried Tears" (눈물이 말랐대) (Soul Dive with Younha)	2012	49	*	—N/a	Non-album singles
"Picnic" (소풍) (So Ji-sub with Younha)	2013	23	*	KOR: 175,312	6PM… Ground
"You Are My Baby" (Park Ki-woong with Younha)	2013	49	*	—N/a	Present
"Fade" (잊혀지겠지) (Philtre with Younha)	2013	90	*	—N/a	Philtre : Scene # 1
"Stay with Me" (Justin Oh featuring Younha)	2014	—	*	—N/a	Non-album single
"We Fight Ourselves" (또 싸워) (Epik High featuring Younha)	2014	6	*	KOR: 373,836	Shoebox
"Love Belt" (Jonghyun featuring Younha)	2015	16	*	KOR: 67,205	Base
"Rolling" (Gill featuring Younha)	2015	—	*	—N/a	R.O.A.D Project #1
"For You Now" (너의 차례) (Suho featuring Younha)	2020	87	42	—N/a	Self-Portrait
"Sleepless" (불면증) (Epitone Project Vocal by YOUNHA)	2020	135	*	—N/a	Non-album single
"Gray So Gray" (그래서 그래) (Epik High featuring Younha)	2022	24	32	—N/a	Epik High Is Here 下 (Part 2)
"—" denotes releases that did not chart or were not released in that region.

=== Promotional singles ===
Title	Year	Album
"All-Day, Everyday" (with Kanto)	2014	Non-album single

== Collaborations ==
Title	Year	Peak chart positions		Sales	Album
Title	Year	KOR	KOR Hot	Sales	Album
"Just the Way You Are" (달리 함께) (with Jung Joon-young)	2014	21	11	KOR: 197,524	Non-album single
"Him" (with Kang Seung-won)	2014	—	*	—N/a	Kang Seung-won Vol.1
"Bat Girl" (with Yoon Jong-shin)	2014	89	*	—N/a	Monthly Project 2014 Yoon Jong-shin
"Can't Stop This Feeling" (티가나) (with Yoo Seung-woo)	2017	—	*	—N/a	Non-album single
"Lazy Love" (with Eden)	2018	—	—	—N/a	Eden_Stardust.01
"Walking in the Rain" (with Chancellor)	2020	—	—	—N/a	Non-album singles
"Merry Merry Christmas" (메리 메리 크리스마스) (with Lee Seok-hoon, CIX, Cignature and Epex)	2022	115	—	—N/a	Non-album singles
"—" denotes releases that did not chart or were not released in that region.

== Other charted songs ==
Title	Year	Peak chart positions			Sales	Album
Title	Year	KOR	KOR Hot	US World	Sales	Album
"People"	2012	46	—	—	KOR: 149,464	Supersonic
"Shower" (소나기)	2012	57	—	—	—N/a	Supersonic
"Spring" (봄은 있었다)	2013	74	—	—	KOR: 97,164	Just Listen
"Timeless" (시간을 믿었어)	2013	100	—	—	—N/a	Subsonic
"Winter Flower" (雪中梅) (featuring RM)	2020	48	33	1	—N/a	Unstable Mindset
"See You" (다음에 봐)	2020	146	68	—	—N/a	Unstable Mindset
"One Day of Twenty" (스무살 어느 날)	2020	159	79	—	—N/a	Unstable Mindset
"26"	2020	170	77	—	—N/a	Unstable Mindset
"Oort Cloud" (오르트구름)	2022	30	8	—	—N/a	End Theory
"—" denotes releases that did not chart or were not released in that region.

== Soundtrack appearances ==
Title	Year	Peak chart positions		Sales	Album
Title	Year	KOR	KOR Hot	Sales	Album
"Nonsense" (말도 안돼)	2010	7	*	—N/a	Personal Taste OST and Lost in Love
"In Dreams" (꿈속에서)	2010	—	*	—N/a	Pokémon: Zoroark: Master of Illusions OST and Lost in Love
"A Drop of Tear" (눈물이 한방울)	2012	31	*	KOR: 204,457	Faith OST
"Greetings from Afar" (멀리서 안부)	2013	43	*	KOR: 253,014	The Queen of Office OST
"My Love from the Star" (별에서 온 그대)	2014	15	9	KOR: 370,797	My Love from the Star OST
"Passionate to Me" (뜨겁게 나를)	2014	20	*	KOR: 81,599	Pinocchio OST
"Pray" (기도)	2015	19	*	KOR: 179,010	Who Are You: School 2015 OST
"Till the Morning Comes" (아침이 밝아올 때까지) (featuring 2nd Moon)	2015	94	*	—N/a	Late Night Restaurant OST
"Sunflower"	2016	47	*	KOR: 116,300	The Doctors OST
"Fly to High"	2016	—	*	—N/a	The God of High School OST
"I Believe"	2016	—	*	—N/a	Cinderella with Four Knights OST
"Dream" (꿈은) (with Kim Min-jae)	2017	—	*	—N/a	Hit the Top OST
"Love U"	2017	—	*	—N/a	Revolutionary Love OST
"Don't Know Whether It Will Melt" (녹을지 몰라요)	2018	—	—	—N/a	Queen of Mystery 2 OST
"I'll Be the Light" (빛이 되어줄게)	2019	—	—	—N/a	The Tale of Nokdu OST
"Letter" (편지)	2022	130	—	—N/a	Ditto OST
"—" denotes releases that did not chart or were not released in that region.

== Other appearances ==
Title	Year	Peak chart positions	Sales	Album
Title	Year	KOR	Sales	Album
"The Street" (그 거리..)	2008	*	—N/a	Stage #1 - TOP
"Follow Your Dreams" (네 꿈을 펼쳐라)	2012	—	—N/a	Immortal Songs: Singing the Legend - Yang Hee-eun Part 1
"Summer Time"	2012	—	—N/a	Immortal Songs: Singing the Legend - Top 10 Summer Song Special Part 1
"The Distant Future" (먼 훗날에) (Original by Park Jeong-woon)	2012	25	KOR: 148,417	I Am a Singer 2 - August Group B Contest
"Don't Leave Me" (내 곁에서 떠나가지 말아요) (Original by The Light and The Salt)	2012	61	—N/a	I Am a Singer 2 - August Singing Contest
"Western Sky" (서쪽 하늘) (Original by Lee Seung-chul)	2012	16	KOR: 301,499	I Am a Singer 2 - September Group A Contest
"Don't Make Me Cry" (날 울리지마) (Original by Shin Seung-hun)	2012	62	—N/a	I Am a Singer 2 - September Singing Contest
"I Don't Care" (Original by 2NE1)	2012	83	—N/a	I Am a Singer 2 - October Group B Contest
"Flaming Sunset" (붉은 노을) (Original by Lee Moon-sae)	2012	—	—N/a	I Am a Singer 2 - October Singing Contest
"Lifetime" (일생을) (Original by Kim Hyun-chul)	2012	92	—N/a	I Am a Singer 2 - The Last Survival November Singer Preliminary Match
"There Is Only You" (오직 너뿐인 나를) (Original by Lee Seung-chul)	2012	74	—N/a	I Am a Singer 2 - The Last Survival November Singer Contest
"Hand in Hand" (손에 손잡고) (with Lee Jung; Original by Koreana)	2012	—	—N/a	I Am a Singer 2 - 2012 Contestant 5 Teams
"Late Regret" (늦은 후회) (with Na Yoon-kwon)	2015	—	—N/a	I Am a Singer Season 3 Episode 6 - Duet Mission
"One Dream One Korea" (with various artist)	2015	—	—N/a	Non-album single
"Like a Star" (별처럼) (with Jobin)	2015	—	—N/a	The King of Mask Singer Episode 33
"Heart Beat Away" (애송이의 사랑)	2015	—	—N/a	The King of Mask Singer Episode 34
"Late Regret" (늦은 후회) (Live Version)	2016	—	—N/a	Two Yoo Project – Sugar Man Part 17
"Talk About Love" (with various artist)	2016	—	—N/a	Hooxi, The Beginning
"Have To" (해요)	2020	—	—N/a	Two Yoo Project – Sugar Man Season 3 Episode 11
"Incomplete" (잊었니...)	2020	—	—N/a	[Vol.51] You Hee-yeol's Sketchbook : 28th Voice 'Sketchbook X Younha'
"—" denotes releases that did not chart or were not released in that region.
