= List of King of Mask Singer episodes (2018) =

- No. of episodes: Special: 1; Regular: 50

Release
- Original network: MBC
- Original release: January 7 – December 30, 2018

Season chronology
- ← Previous; 2017 Next → 2019

This is a list of episodes of the South Korean variety-music show King of Mask Singer in 2018. The show airs on MBC as part of their Sunday Night lineup. The names listed below are in performance order.

– Contestant is instantly eliminated by the live audience and judging panel
– After being eliminated, contestant performs a prepared song for the next round and takes off their mask during the instrumental break
– After being eliminated and revealing their identity, contestant has another special performance.
– Contestant advances to the next round.
– Contestant becomes the challenger.
– Mask King.

== Episodes ==
=== 68th Generation Mask King ===
- Contestants: Kim Do-hyang, Ahn Young-mi, Solbin (Laboum), Seungkwan (Seventeen), Kim Na-ni, Yoo Ho-seok (Click-B), Kim Mi-hwa, Im Do-hyuk
Episodes 135 – 136

Episode 135

Episode 135 was broadcast on January 7, 2018. This marks the beginning of the Sixty-eighth Generation.

Order	Stage Name	Real Name	Song	Original artist	Vote
Round 1
Pair 1	Millionaire	Kim Do-hyang	What Is the Life? (사는게 뭔지)	Lee Moo-song	57
Pair 1	Calendar	Ahn Young-mi	What Is the Life? (사는게 뭔지)	Lee Moo-song	42
2nd Song	Calendar	Ahn Young-mi	One Happy Day (기분 좋은 날)	Kim Wan-sun	–
Pair 2	The Flower Fairy	Solbin of Laboum	Lean on Me (어깨)	Soyou & Kwon Jung-yeol	39
Pair 2	Woodcutter	Seungkwan of SEVENTEEN	Lean on Me (어깨)	Soyou & Kwon Jung-yeol	60
2nd Song	The Flower Fairy	Solbin of Laboum	It's Strange, With You (묘해, 너와)	Acoustic Collabo	–
Pair 3	The Girl Swinging	Kim Na-ni	Love Has Left Again (또 한번 사랑은 가고)	Lee Ki-chan	62
Pair 3	Neolttwigi	Yoo Ho-seok of Click-B	Love Has Left Again (또 한번 사랑은 가고)	Lee Ki-chan	37
2nd Song	Neolttwigi	Yoo Ho-seok of Click-B	Show	Kim Won-jun	–
Pair 4	Sunrise Girl	Kim Mi-hwa	In Live (살다보면)	Kwon Ji-won	38
Pair 4	Full of Luck	Im Do-hyuk	In Live (살다보면)	Kwon Ji-won	61
2nd Song	Sunrise Girl	Kim Mi-hwa	Desert Island (무인도)	Kim Choo-ja	–

Episode 136

Episode 136 was broadcast on January 14, 2018.

Order	Stage Name	Real Name	Song	Original artist	Vote
Round 2
Pair 1	Millionaire	Kim Do-hyang	After This Night (이 밤이 지나면)	Yim Jae-beom	29
Pair 1	Woodcutter	Seungkwan of SEVENTEEN	I Hope (바래)	F.T. Island	70
Pair 2	The Girl Swinging	Kim Na-ni	Good Bye Sadness, Hello Happiness	Yoon Mi-rae	32
Pair 2	Full of Luck	Im Do-hyuk	Like It (좋니)	Yoon Jong-shin	67
Round 3
Finalists	Woodcutter	Seungkwan of SEVENTEEN	Throw Away (연)	Big Mama	46
Finalists	Full of Luck	Im Do-hyuk	One Flew Over the Cuckoo's Nest (뻐꾸기 둥지 위로 날아간 새)	Kim Gun-mo	53
Final
Battle	Full of Luck	Im Do-hyuk	Previous three songs used as voting standard		31
Battle	Red Mouth	Sunwoo Jung-a	The Innocent Macho (순정마초)	Parasian (Jeong Hyeong-don & Jung Jae-hyung)	68

=== 69th Generation Mask King ===
- Contestants: Shownu (Monsta X), Lucia, Kang Sung-jin, Kim Min-seok (MeloMance), Eunjung (T-ara), Kyulkyung (Pristin), Jo Kwon (2AM), Kim Jae-woo
Episodes 137 – 138

Episode 137

Episode 137 was broadcast on January 21, 2018. This marks the beginning of the Sixty-ninth Generation.

Order	Stage Name	Real Name	Song	Original artist	Vote
Round 1
Pair 1	Okidoki	Shownu of Monsta X	Perhaps Love (사랑인가요)	J.ae & Howl (하울)	41
Pair 1	Princess	Lucia	Perhaps Love (사랑인가요)	J.ae & Howl (하울)	58
2nd Song	Okidoki	Shownu of Monsta X	You're the One (너뿐이야)	Park Jin-young	–
Pair 2	Medal Hunter	Kang Sung-jin	With You (그대와 함께)	The Blue	25
Pair 2	Flame Man	Kim Min-seok of MeloMance	With You (그대와 함께)	The Blue	74
2nd Song	Medal Hunter	Kang Sung-jin	The Love I Committed (내가 저지른 사랑)	Im Chang-jung	–
Pair 3	Strawberry Girl	Eunjung of T-ara	I'm Different (나는달라)	Hi Suhyun ft. Bobby	55
Pair 3	Flower Girl	Kyulkyung of PRISTIN	I'm Different (나는달라)	Hi Suhyun ft. Bobby	44
2nd Song	Flower Girl	Kyulkyung of PRISTIN	Hey (Rock Ver.) (있잖아)	IU	–
Pair 4	Mystery Circle	Jo Kwon of 2AM	Napal Baji (나팔바지)	Psy	76
Pair 4	Pyramid Man	Kim Jae-woo	Napal Baji (나팔바지)	Psy	23
2nd Song	Pyramid Man	Kim Jae-woo	Thought of You (네 생각)	John Park	–

Episode 138

Episode 138 was broadcast on January 28, 2018.

Order	Stage Name	Real Name	Song	Original artist	Vote
Round 2
Pair 1	Princess	Lucia	Maron Doll (마론인형)	Jaurim	40
Pair 1	Flame Man	Kim Min-seok of MeloMance	I'll Move (비켜줄게)	Brown Eyed Soul	59
Pair 2	Strawberry Girl	Eunjung of T-ara	R.P.G. (Rocket Punch Generation)	W & Whale	32
Pair 2	Mystery Circle	Jo Kwon of 2AM	Illusion (환상)	Park Ji-yoon	67
Round 3
Finalists	Flame Man	Kim Min-seok of MeloMance	Love Me Right	EXO	62
Finalists	Mystery Circle	Jo Kwon of 2AM	I Believe (믿어요)	TVXQ	37
Final
Battle	Flame Man	Kim Min-seok of MeloMance	Previous three songs used as voting standard		46
Battle	Red Mouth	Sunwoo Jung-a	Reset	Toy ft. Lee Juck	53

=== 70th Generation Mask King ===
- Contestants: Juniel, Kim Ji-soo, Shin Hyun-soo, Yoo Seul-gi (Duetto), Ju-ne (iKON), JooE (Momoland), Ivy, Park Joon-hyung
Episodes 139 – 140

Episode 139

Episode 139 was broadcast on February 4, 2018. This marks the beginning of the Seventieth Generation.

Order	Stage Name	Real Name	Song	Original artist	Vote
Round 1
Pair 1	Cake Girl	Juniel	Last Goodbye (오랜 날 오랜 밤)	AKMU	35
Pair 1	Pizza Man	Kim Ji-soo	Last Goodbye (오랜 날 오랜 밤)	AKMU	64
2nd Song	Cake Girl	Juniel	Because of a Man (남자 때문에)	JOO	–
Pair 2	Blue Dragon	Shin Hyun-soo	Those Days (그날들)	Kim Kwang-seok	31
Pair 2	Vermilion Bird	Yoo Seul-gi of Duetto	Those Days (그날들)	Kim Kwang-seok	68
2nd Song	Blue Dragon	Shin Hyun-soo	I'm Your Man	John Park	–
Pair 3	Racing Car	Ju-ne of iKON	I Say "Ya!" You Say "Yeah!" (내가 야! 하면 넌 예!)	Kim Tae-woo ft. Lyn	51
Pair 3	Helicopter	JooE of Momoland	I Say "Ya!" You Say "Yeah!" (내가 야! 하면 넌 예!)	Kim Tae-woo ft. Lyn	48
2nd Song	Helicopter	JooE of Momoland	I Was a Car	Song Ji-yeon (송지연)	–
Pair 4	Gypsy Woman	Ivy	Why Do You (너는 왜)	Chuli and Miae	58
Pair 4	Hippie Man	Park Joon-hyung	Why Do You (너는 왜)	Chuli and Miae	41
2nd Song	Hippie Man	Park Joon-hyung	The Age of the Cathedrals (Korean version) (대성당들의 시대)	Musical Notre-Dame de Paris OST	–

Episode 140

Episode 140 was broadcast on February 11, 2018. Due to broadcast of 2018 Winter Olympics before, this episode was late aired starting 18:15 (KST) by using the timeframe of Wizard of Nowhere.

Order	Stage Name	Real Name	Song	Original artist	Vote
Round 2
Pair 1	Pizza Man	Kim Ji-soo	Stalker (스토커)	10cm	33
Pair 1	Vermilion Bird	Yoo Seul-gi of Duetto	Butterfly	Loveholics	66
Pair 2	Racing Car	Ju-ne of iKON	I Didn't Know That Time (그땐 미처 알지 못했지)	Lee Juck	31
Pair 2	Gypsy Woman	Ivy	A Teardrop by Itself (덩그러니)	Lee Soo-young	68
Round 3
Finalists	Vermilion Bird	Yoo Seul-gi of Duetto	A Goose's Dream (거위의 꿈)	Carnival	32
Finalists	Gypsy Woman	Ivy	I (난)	Ock Joo-hyun	67
Final
Battle	Gypsy Woman	Ivy	Previous three songs used as voting standard		51
Battle	Red Mouth	Sunwoo Jung-a	Peek-a-Boo (피카부)	Red Velvet	48

=== 71st Generation Mask King ===
- Contestants: Gilgu (Gilgu Bonggu), Byun Gi-soo, Lee Soo-min, Hui (Pentagon), Jung Shi-ah, Oh Seung-yoon, Son Seung-yeon, Park Joo-hee
Episodes 141 – 142

Episode 141

Episode 141 was broadcast on February 18, 2018. This marks the beginning of the Seventy-first Generation.

Order	Stage Name	Real Name	Song	Original artist	Vote
Round 1
Pair 1	Bodhidharma	Gilgu of Gilgu Bonggu	My Old Story (나의 옛날이야기)	Jo Deok-bae	62
Pair 1	Dalmatians	Byun Gi-soo	My Old Story (나의 옛날이야기)	Jo Deok-bae	37
2nd Song	Dalmatians	Byun Gi-soo	Adios	Eun Ji-won ft. Mr. Tyfoon	–
Pair 2	Money Girl	Lee Soo-min	Trouble Maker	Trouble Maker	33
Pair 2	Crane Guy	Hui of PENTAGON	Trouble Maker	Trouble Maker	66
2nd Song	Money Girl	Lee Soo-min	Deviation (일탈)	Jaurim	–
Pair 3	Mother-of-Pearl Girl	Jung Shi-ah	Meaning of You (너의 의미)	Sanulrim	28
Pair 3	Folding Screen Man	Oh Seung-yoon	Meaning of You (너의 의미)	Sanulrim	71
2nd Song	Mother-of-Pearl Girl	Jung Shi-ah	Wait a Second (기다려 늑대)	Juliet (줄리엣)	–
Pair 4	The East Invincibility	Son Seung-yeon	Refusal (거부)	Big Mama	67
Pair 4	Count a Demon	Park Joo-hee	Refusal (거부)	Big Mama	32
2nd Song	Count a Demon	Park Joo-hee	Music Is My Life	Lim Jeong-hee	–

Episode 142

Episode 142 was broadcast on February 25, 2018.

Order	Stage Name	Real Name	Song	Original artist	Vote
Round 2
Pair 1	Bodhidharma	Gilgu of Gilgu Bonggu	My Son	Kim Gun-mo	49
Pair 1	Crane Guy	Hui of PENTAGON	DNA	BTS	50
Pair 2	Folding Screen Man	Oh Seung-yoon	If We (이럴거면 헤어지지 말았어야지)	Park Won	31
Pair 2	The East Invincibility	Son Seung-yeon	U&I	Ailee	68
Round 3
Finalists	Crane Guy	Hui of PENTAGON	The Fool (이 바보야)	Jung Seung-hwan	17
Finalists	The East Invincibility	Son Seung-yeon	In the Dream (꿈에)	Lena Park	82
Final
Battle	The East Invincibility	Son Seung-yeon	Previous three songs used as voting standard		65
Battle	Gypsy Woman	Ivy	The Red Shoes (분홍신)	IU	34

=== 72nd Generation Mask King ===
- Contestants: Lee Jang-woo, Han Hyun-min, Seo Ji-seok, Nine9 (Dear Cloud), Hwang Min-hyun (Wanna One/NU'EST), YooA (Oh My Girl), The Ray, Lee Chang-min (2AM/Homme)
Episodes 143 – 144

Episode 143

Episode 143 was broadcast on March 4, 2018. This marks the beginning of the Seventy-second Generation.

Order	Stage Name	Real Name	Song	Original artist	Vote
Round 1
Pair 1	Spring	Lee Jang-woo	You Touched My Heart (넌 감동이었어)	Sung Si-kyung	75
Pair 1	Braird Man	Han Hyun-min	You Touched My Heart (넌 감동이었어)	Sung Si-kyung	24
2nd Song	Braird Man	Han Hyun-min	Dance with DOC (DOC와 춤을)	DJ Doc	–
Pair 2	Mask Man	Seo Ji-seok	It's for You (널 위한 거야)	Miss Mister	27
Pair 2	Matrix	Nine9 of Dear Cloud	It's for You (널 위한 거야)	Miss Mister	72
2nd Song	Mask Man	Seo Ji-seok	Please Love Her (그녀를 사랑해줘요)	Ha Dong-kyun	–
Pair 3	Terius	Hwang Min-hyun of Wanna One/NU'EST	Romeo N Juliet	Clazziquai	51
Pair 3	A Little Princess	YooA of Oh My Girl	Romeo N Juliet	Clazziquai	48
2nd Song	A Little Princess	YooA of Oh My Girl	Rhinoceros (코뿔소)	Han Young-ae	–
Pair 4	Ogomu	The Ray	What Are the Friends for (친구라는 건)	Park Hyo-shin ft. Kim Bum-soo	42
Pair 4	Drum Man	Lee Chang-min of 2AM/Homme	What Are the Friends for (친구라는 건)	Park Hyo-shin ft. Kim Bum-soo	57
2nd Song	Ogomu	The Ray	Gashina (가시나)	Sunmi	–

Episode 144

Episode 144 was broadcast on March 11, 2018.

Order	Stage Name	Real Name	Song	Original artist	Vote
Round 2
Pair 1	Spring	Lee Jang-woo	Practice Separation (이별연습)	Insooni	29
Pair 1	Matrix	Nine9 of Dear Cloud	Don't Say It's Not Love (사랑이 아니라 말하지 말아요)	Lee So-ra	70
Pair 2	Terius	Hwang Min-hyun of Wanna One/NU'EST	Comes and Goes (와리가리)	Hyukoh	34
Pair 2	Drum Man	Lee Chang-min of 2AM/Homme	Lies (거짓말)	Big Bang	65
Round 3
Finalists	Matrix	Nine9 of Dear Cloud	With You (그대랑)	Lee Juck	32
Finalists	Drum Man	Lee Chang-min of 2AM/Homme	I'm in Love (사랑이라서)	Yim Jae-beom	67
Final
Battle	Drum Man	Lee Chang-min of 2AM/Homme	Previous three songs used as voting standard		25
Battle	The East Invincibility	Son Seung-yeon	Winter Love (겨울사랑) (That Winter, the Wind Blows OST)	The One	74

=== 73rd Generation Mask King ===
- Contestants: Kim Kyu-jong (SS501/Double S 301), Dalchong, Kang Hyung-wook, Jundoy (Lazybone), Dongwoo (INFINITE), Jung Tae-ho, Park Ji-yoon, Lee Jin-sol (April)
Episodes 145 – 146

Episode 145

Episode 145 was broadcast on March 18, 2018. This marks the beginning of the Seventy-third Generation.

Order	Stage Name	Real Name	Song	Original artist	Vote
Round 1
Pair 1	So Let It Be to Cry	Kim Kyu-jong of SS501/Double S 301	Not Spring, Love, or Cherry Blossoms (봄, 사랑, 벚꽃 말고)	High4 ft. IU	53
Pair 1	Queen of the Night	Dalchong	Not Spring, Love, or Cherry Blossoms (봄, 사랑, 벚꽃 말고)	High4 ft. IU	46
2nd Song	Queen of the Night	Dalchong	Welcome to the Love Hospital (사랑의 병원으로 놀러 오세요)	Jaurim	–
Pair 2	Park Circuit Breaker	Kang Hyung-wook	March (행진)	Jeon In-kwon	21
Pair 2	Antenna	Jundoy of Lazybone	March (행진)	Jeon In-kwon	78
2nd Song	Park Circuit Breaker	Kang Hyung-wook	Hyehwa-dong (혜화동)	Dongmulwon	–
Pair 3	A Knight of the Razor	Dongwoo of INFINITE	I Will Love You (사랑을 할꺼야)	Green Area	75
Pair 3	Optical Store	Jung Tae-ho	I Will Love You (사랑을 할꺼야)	Green Area	24
2nd Song	Optical Store	Jung Tae-ho	Dreaming	Click-B	–
Pair 4	La-la-land	Park Ji-yoon	Sweety	S♯arp	58
Pair 4	Harlequin	Jinsol of April	Sweety	S♯arp	41
2nd Song	Harlequin	Jinsol of April	Don't Go Today (오늘은 가지마)	Ben	–

Episode 146

Episode 146 was broadcast on March 25, 2018.

Order	Stage Name	Real Name	Song	Original artist	Vote
Round 2
Pair 1	So Let It Be to Cry	Kim Kyu-jong of SS501/Double S 301	Don't Forget (잊어버리지마)	Crush ft. Taeyeon	48
Pair 1	Antenna	Jundoy of Lazybone	Everybody Cha Cha Cha (다함께 차차차)	Seol Woon-do	51
Pair 2	A Knight of the Razor	Dongwoo of INFINITE	Reunion in Memories (추억 속의 재회)	Cho Yong-pil	44
Pair 2	La-la-land	Park Ji-yoon	Kitchen (키친)	Lee So-eun	55
Round 3
Finalists	Antenna	Jundoy of Lazybone	Love Love Love (사랑 사랑 사랑)	Kim Hyun-sik	36
Finalists	La-la-land	Park Ji-yoon	Waiting (늘)	BoA	63
Final
Battle	La-la-land	Park Ji-yoon	Previous three songs used as voting standard		15
Battle	The East Invincibility	Son Seung-yeon	Y Si Fuera Ella (혜야)	Shinee	84

=== 74th Generation Mask King ===
- Contestants: Lee Min-woong, Kim Hyun-sung, JeA (Brown Eyed Girls), Park Sang-myun, Namoo (Bye Bye Sea), Yoo Hwe-seung (N.Flying), Shin Youngsook, Yang Ji-won (SPICA)
Episodes 147 – 148

Episode 147

Episode 147 was broadcast on April 1, 2018. This marks the beginning of the Seventy-fourth Generation.

Order	Stage Name	Real Name	Song	Original artist	Vote
Round 1
Pair 1	Onion Man	Lee Min-woong	Your Smile in My Memory (미소 속에 비친 그대)	Shin Seung-hun	48
Pair 1	Mushroom Man	Kim Hyun-sung	Your Smile in My Memory (미소 속에 비친 그대)	Shin Seung-hun	51
2nd Song	Onion Man	Lee Min-woong	Too Great (대단한 너)	Lee Jae-young	–
Pair 2	Scallop	JeA of Brown Eyed Girls	Flaming Sunset (붉은 노을)	Lee Moon-se	71
Pair 2	Hermit Crab	Park Sang-myun	Flaming Sunset (붉은 노을)	Lee Moon-se	28
2nd Song	Hermit Crab	Park Sang-myun	With You (님과 함께)	Nam Jin	–
Pair 3	Game Manager	Namoo of Bye Bye Sea	Aspirin (아스피린)	Girl (걸)	43
Pair 3	Gameboy	Yoo Hwe-seung of N.Flying	Aspirin (아스피린)	Girl (걸)	56
2nd Song	Game Manager	Namoo of Bye Bye Sea	Good (좋다)	Daybreak	–
Pair 4	Moulin Rouge	Shin Youngsook	Super Star	Jewelry	67
Pair 4	Daisy	Yang Ji-won of SPICA	Super Star	Jewelry	32
2nd Song	Daisy	Yang Ji-won of SPICA	Goodbye Tears (눈물아 안녕)	Ivy	–

Episode 148

Episode 148 was broadcast on April 8, 2018.

Order	Stage Name	Real Name	Song	Original artist	Vote
Round 2
Pair 1	Mushroom Man	Kim Hyun-sung	Dream (꿈)	Cho Yong-pil	30
Pair 1	Scallop	JeA of Brown Eyed Girls	That XX (그XX)	G-Dragon	69
Pair 2	Gameboy	Yoo Hwe-seung of N.Flying	Goodbye for a Moment (잠시만 안녕)	MC the Max	51
Pair 2	Moulin Rouge	Shin Youngsook	Nocturne (녹턴)	Lee Eun-mi	48
Round 3
Finalists	Scallop	JeA of Brown Eyed Girls	Rain	Taeyeon	36
Finalists	Gameboy	Yoo Hwe-seung of N.Flying	To Her Love (그녀의 연인에게)	K2	63
Final
Battle	Gameboy	Yoo Hwe-seung of N.Flying	Previous three songs used as voting standard		27
Battle	The East Invincibility	Son Seung-yeon	Love, Never Fade (사랑, 결코 시들지 않는...)	Seomoon Tak	72

=== 75th Generation Mask King ===
- Contestants: Babylon, Michelle Lee, Hoya, Lee Hyun-kyung, MIIII, Lim Na-young (Pristin), Joo Byung-jin, Kim Jae-hwan (Wanna One)
Episodes 149 – 150

Episode 149

Episode 149 was broadcast on April 15, 2018. This marks the beginning of the Seventy-fifth Generation.

Order	Stage Name	Real Name	Song	Original artist	Vote
Round 1
Pair 1	Comb-pattern Pottery	Babylon	It's Gonna Be Rolling	Park Hyo-shin & Lee So-ra	54
Pair 1	Goryeo Celadon	Michelle Lee	It's Gonna Be Rolling	Park Hyo-shin & Lee So-ra	45
2nd Song	Goryeo Celadon	Michelle Lee	Décalcomanie	Mamamoo	–
Pair 2	Carillon	Hoya	Dream	Suzy & Baekhyun	71
Pair 2	Organ Girl	Lee Hyun-kyung	Dream	Suzy & Baekhyun	28
2nd Song	Organ Girl	Lee Hyun-kyung	I Always Miss You (나 항상 그대를)	Lee Sun-hee	–
Pair 3	Cherry Blossoms Girl	MIIII	200%	AKMU	51
Pair 3	Dandelion Girl	Nayoung of PRISTIN	200%	AKMU	48
2nd Song	Dandelion Girl	Nayoung of PRISTIN	Umbrella (우산)	Epik High ft. Younha	–
Pair 4	Chief Gatekeeper	Joo Byung-jin	If You	Big Bang	32
Pair 4	Royal Guard	Kim Jae-hwan of Wanna One	If You	Big Bang	67
2nd Song	Chief Gatekeeper	Joo Byung-jin	The Sky in the West (서쪽 하늘)	Lee Seung-chul	–

Episode 150

Episode 150 was broadcast on April 22, 2018.

Order	Stage Name	Real Name	Song	Original artist	Vote
Round 2
Pair 1	Comb-pattern Pottery	Babylon	Mirotic (주몬-MIROTIC)	TVXQ	64
Pair 1	Carillon	Hoya	The Road (길)	Paul Kim	35
Pair 2	Cherry Blossoms Girl	MIIII	I Miss You (Guardian: The Lonely and Great God OST)	Soyou	20
Pair 2	Royal Guard	Kim Jae-hwan of Wanna One	Fool (바보)	Park Hyo-shin	79
Round 3
Finalists	Comb-pattern Pottery	Babylon	Comeback Again (다시 와주라)	Vibe	31
Finalists	Royal Guard	Kim Jae-hwan of Wanna One	Don't Touch Me (손대지마)	Ailee	68
Final
Battle	Royal Guard	Kim Jae-hwan of Wanna One	Previous three songs used as voting standard		33
Battle	The East Invincibility	Son Seung-yeon	Song of the Wind (바람의 노래)	Cho Yong-pil	66

=== 76th Generation Mask King ===
- Contestants: Jeonghwa (EXID), Paul Kim, Hwang Seok-jeong, High.D (Sonamoo), Lee Jun-young (U-KISS/UNB), Lee Sang-hoon, Kim Chang-yeol (DJ DOC), Park Hye-kyung
Episodes 151 – 152

Episode 151

Episode 151 was broadcast on April 29, 2018. This marks the beginning of the Seventy-sixth Generation.

Order	Stage Name	Real Name	Song	Original artist	Vote
Round 1
Pair 1	Cruise of Endorphins	Jeonghwa of EXID	It's You (그대네요)	Sung Si-kyung & IU	36
Pair 1	Safari	Paul Kim	It's You (그대네요)	Sung Si-kyung & IU	63
2nd Song	Endorphin Cruise	Jeonghwa of EXID	Secret Garden (비밀의 화원)	Lee Tzsche	–
Pair 2	Tower Bridge	Hwang Seok-jeong	I Don't Know Anything But Love (사랑밖엔 난 몰라)	Sim Soo-bong	46
Pair 2	Taj Mahal	High.D of Sonamoo	I Don't Know Anything But Love (사랑밖엔 난 몰라)	Sim Soo-bong	53
2nd Song	Tower Bridge	Hwang Seok-jeong	The Woman Outside the Window (창밖의 여자)	Cho Yong-pil	–
Pair 3	Compass	Jun of U-KISS/UNB	That Was What Happened Then (그땐 그랬지)	Carnival	51
Pair 3	GPS	Lee Sang-hoon	That Was What Happened Then (그땐 그랬지)	Carnival	48
2nd Song	GPS	Lee Sang-hoon	As I Say (말하는 대로)	Sagging Snail (Yoo Jae-suk & Lee Juck)	–
Pair 4	Gazette Detective	Kim Chang-yeol of DJ Doc	First Impression (첫인상)	Kim Gun-mo	52
Pair 4	Magical Princess Minky	Park Hye-kyung	First Impression (첫인상)	Kim Gun-mo	47
2nd Song	Magical Princess Minky	Park Hye-kyung	The Face I Miss (보고 싶은 얼굴)	Min Hae-kyung	–

Episode 152

Episode 152 was broadcast on May 6, 2018.

Order	Stage Name	Real Name	Song	Original artist	Vote
Round 2
Pair 1	Safari	Paul Kim	Energetic (에너제틱)	Wanna One	32
Pair 1	Taj Mahal	High.D of Sonamoo	Storm	Rumors	67
Pair 2	Compass	Jun of U-KISS/UNB	Eraser (지우개)	Ali	47
Pair 2	Gazette Detective	Kim Chang-yeol of DJ Doc	Crooked (삐딱하게)	G-Dragon	52
Round 3
Finalists	Taj Mahal	High.D of Sonamoo	I Hope It's Breeze (바람이 불었으면 좋겠어)	Gilgu Bonggu	47
Finalists	Gazette Detective	Kim Chang-yeol of DJ Doc	Thorn (가시)	Buzz	52
Final
Battle	Gazette Detective	Kim Chang-yeol of DJ Doc	Previous three songs used as voting standard		28
Battle	The East Invincibility	Son Seung-yeon	Shout	Kim Kyung-ho	71

=== 77th Generation Mask King ===
- Contestants: Hong Joo-chan (Golden Child), Ji Se-hee, Hoshi (Seventeen), Hanhae (Phantom), Park Seung-il (Ulala Session), Lee Dong-joon, Kim Ye-won (Jewelry), Minseo (singer, born 1996)
Episodes 153 – 154

Episode 153

Episode 153 was broadcast on May 13, 2018. This marks the beginning of the Seventy-seventh Generation.

Order	Stage Name	Real Name	Song	Original artist	Vote
Opening	Unicorn	Ryan Reynolds	Tomorrow	Musical Annie OST	–
Round 1
Pair 1	Mondrian	Joochan of Golden Child	Deciding Not to Forget (잊지 말기로 해)	Jang Pil-soon & Kim Hyun-cheol	34
Pair 1	Picasso	Ji Se-hee	Deciding Not to Forget (잊지 말기로 해)	Jang Pil-soon & Kim Hyun-cheol	65
2nd Song	Mondrian	Joochan of Golden Child	Turning the Pages of Memories (추억의 책장을 넘기면)	Lee Sun-hee	–
Pair 2	Camping Boy	Hoshi of SEVENTEEN	Dance with Wolf (늑대와 함께 춤을)	Im Chang-jung	52
Pair 2	Carrier Man	Hanhae	Dance with Wolf (늑대와 함께 춤을)	Im Chang-jung	47
2nd Song	Carrier Man	Hanhae	So Nice (죽겠네)	10cm	–
Pair 3	Coming-of-Age Day	Park Seung-il of Ulala Session	Unconditional (무조건)	Park Sang-cheol	63
Pair 3	Teacher's Day	Lee Dong-joon	Unconditional (무조건)	Park Sang-cheol	36
2nd Song	Teachers' Day	Lee Dong-joon	Side Road (골목길)	Shinchon Blues	–
Pair 4	Matryoshka	Kim Ye-won of Jewelry	Just a Feeling	S.E.S.	37
Pair 4	Vietnam Girl	Min Seo	Just a Feeling	S.E.S.	62
2nd Song	Matryoshka	Kim Ye-won of Jewelry	Spring Past (봄날은 간다)	Kim Yoon-ah	–

Episode 154

Episode 154 was broadcast on May 20, 2018.

Order	Stage Name	Real Name	Song	Original artist	Vote
Round 2
Pair 1	Picasso	Ji Se-hee	Never Ending Story	Boohwal	64
Pair 1	Camping Boy	Hoshi of SEVENTEEN	Bad Guy (나쁜 남자)	Rain	35
Pair 2	Coming-of-Age Day	Park Seung-il of Ulala Session	Family Picture (가족사진)	Kim Jin-ho	48
Pair 2	Vietnam Girl	Min Seo	That Woman (그여자)	Baek Ji-young	51
Round 3
Finalists	Picasso	Ji Se-hee	Childish Adult (어른아이)	Gummy	73
Finalists	Vietnam Girl	Min Seo	Rough (Running Through Time) (시간을 달려서)	GFriend	26
Final
Battle	Picasso	Ji Se-hee	Previous three songs used as voting standard		42
Battle	The East Invincibility	Son Seung-yeon	Love (사랑)	Yim Jae-beom	57

=== 78th Generation Mask King ===
- Contestants: Kim So-hee, Ko Eun-sung, Nam Choon-bong (Travel Skeches (band)), Moon Ji-ae, Kisum, Han Young, Eunkwang (BtoB), Kim Ki-doo
Episodes 155 – 156

Episode 155

Episode 155 was broadcast on May 27, 2018. This marks the beginning of the Seventy-eighth Generation.

Order	Stage Name	Real Name	Song	Original artist	Vote
Round 1
Pair 1	Jewelry Sauna	Kim So-hee	Just the Way We Love (우리 사랑 이대로)	Joo Young-hoon & Lee Hye-jin	43
Pair 1	Open-air Bath	Ko Eun-sung	Just the Way We Love (우리 사랑 이대로)	Joo Young-hoon & Lee Hye-jin	56
2nd Song	Jewelry Sauna	Kim So-hee	Roller Coaster	Chung Ha	–
Pair 2	Gyeongbokgung Palace	Nam Choon-bong of Travel Sketch	For Couples Just Begun (시작되는 연인들을 위해)	Lee Won-jin	69
Pair 2	Opera House	Moon Ji-ae	For Couples Just Begun (시작되는 연인들을 위해)	Lee Won-jin	30
2nd Song	Opera House	Moon Ji-ae	I'm Loneliness You're Longing (나는 외로움 그대는 그리움)	Park Young-mi	–
Pair 3	Love Girl	Kisum	Love Battery (사랑의 배터리)	Hong Jin-young	38
Pair 3	Good Girl	Han Young	Love Battery (사랑의 배터리)	Hong Jin-young	61
2nd Song	Love Girl	Kisum	Entertainer (연예인)	Psy	–
Pair 4	Gladiator	Eunkwang of BtoB	Running in the Sky (하늘을 달리다)	Lee Juck	66
Pair 4	Bullfighter	Kim Ki-doo	Running in the Sky (하늘을 달리다)	Lee Juck	33
2nd Song	Bullfighter	Kim Ki-doo	Footsteps (발걸음)	Emerald Castle	–

Episode 156

Episode 156 was broadcast on June 3, 2018.

Order	Stage Name	Real Name	Song	Original artist	Vote
Round 2
Pair 1	Open-air Bath	Ko Eun-sung	Besame Mucho (베사메무쵸)	Hyun In	56
Pair 1	Gyeongbokgung Palace	Nam Choon-bong of Travel Sketch	With a Heart That Should Forget (잊어야 한다는 마음으로)	Kim Kwang-seok	43
Pair 2	Good Girl	Han Young	Let's Leave Now (이젠 떠나가볼까)	Kim Hye-rim	28
Pair 2	Gladiator	Eunkwang of BtoB	I Will Survive (난 괜찮아)	Jinju	71
Round 3
Finalists	Open-air Bath	Ko Eun-sung	Love without Regret (후회 없는 사랑)	The Position	35
Finalists	Gladiator	Eunkwang of BtoB	Already to Me (이미 나에게로)	Im Chang-jung	64
Final
Battle	Gladiator	Eunkwang of BtoB	Previous three songs used as voting standard		40
Battle	The East Invincibility	Son Seung-yeon	Moon's Fall (달의 몰락)	Kim Hyun-cheol	59

=== 79th Generation Mask King ===
- Contestants: Shin Hyun-hee (Seenroot), Jin (Lovelyz), Ha Sung-woon (Wanna One/Hotshot), Kang Doo, Park Kyung (Block B), Jung Yi-rang, Kim Gyu-ri, Han Dong-geun
Episodes 157 – 158

Episode 157

Episode 157 was broadcast on June 10, 2018. This marks the beginning of the Seventy-ninth Generation.

Order	Stage Name	Real Name	Song	Original artist	Vote
Round 1
Pair 1	CD Player	Shin Hyun-hee of Seenroot	Run Devil Run	Girls' Generation	54
Pair 1	Cassette Girl	Jin of Lovelyz	Run Devil Run	Girls' Generation	45
2nd Song	Cassette Girl	Jin of Lovelyz	Can You Hear Me (들리나요...) (Beethoven Virus OST)	Taeyeon	–
Pair 2	Lesser Panda	Ha Sung-woon of Wanna One/Hotshot	Smile Again (으라차차)	Rumble Fish	67
Pair 2	Sloth	Kang Doo	Smile Again (으라차차)	Rumble Fish	32
2nd Song	Sloth	Kang Doo	It Will Pass (지나간다)	Kim Bum-soo	–
Pair 3	Knight Rider	Park Kyung of Block B	Hawaiian Couple	Humming Urban Stereo	66
Pair 3	Ximena Teacher	Jung Yi-rang	Hawaiian Couple	Humming Urban Stereo	33
2nd Song	Ximena Teacher	Jung Yi-rang	From Me to You (난 너에게) (Lee Jang-ho's Baseball Team OST)	Jung Soo-ra	–
Pair 4	Frida Kahlo	Kim Gyu-ri	To You My Love (내사랑 투유)	Jo Gap-kyung & Hong Seo-beom	24
Pair 4	Bob Ross	Han Dong-geun	To You My Love (내사랑 투유)	Jo Gap-kyung & Hong Seo-beom	75
2nd Song	Frida Kahlo	Kim Gyu-ri	A Goose's Dream (거위의 꿈)	Carnival	–

Episode 158

Episode 158 was broadcast on June 17, 2018.

Order	Stage Name	Real Name	Song	Original artist	Vote
Round 2
Pair 1	CD Player	Shin Hyun-hee of Seenroot	I'm My Fan (팬이야)	Jaurim	41
Pair 1	Lesser Panda	Ha Sung-woon of Wanna One/Hotshot	Recede (멀어지다)	Nell	58
Pair 2	Knight Rider	Park Kyung of Block B	Don't Flirt (끼부리지마)	Winner	21
Pair 2	Bob Ross	Han Dong-geun	Downpour (소나기)	I.O.I	78
Round 3
Finalists	Lesser Panda	Ha Sung-woon of Wanna One/Hotshot	Appear (나타나)	Kim Bum-soo	15
Finalists	Bob Ross	Han Dong-geun	An Essay of Memory (기억의 습작)	Exhibition	84
Final
Battle	Bob Ross	Han Dong-geun	Previous three songs used as voting standard		51
Battle	The East Invincibility	Son Seung-yeon	Sherlock (Clue + Note) (셜록)	Shinee	48

=== 80th Generation Mask King ===
- Contestants: Cho Jun-ho, Kangnam, Shim Jin-hwa, Baekho (NU'EST), Kim Jun-hyun, Killagramz, Kim Soo-yeon, Hyejeong (AOA)
Episodes 159 – 160

Episode 159

Episode 159 was broadcast on June 24, 2018. This marks the beginning of the Eightieth Generation.

Order	Stage Name	Real Name	Song	Original artist	Vote
Round 1
Pair 1	Cactus	Cho Jun-ho	Blue Whale (흰수염고래)	YB	12
Pair 1	Dragon Fruit	Kangnam	Blue Whale (흰수염고래)	YB	87
2nd Song	Cactus	Cho Jun-ho	Prelude (서시)	Shin Sung-woo	–
Pair 2	Victoria Beckham	Shim Jin-hwa	Broken Heart (실연)	Koyote	29
Pair 2	David Beckham	Baekho of NU'EST	Broken Heart (실연)	Koyote	70
2nd Song	Victoria Beckham	Shim Jin-hwa	Breakup With Her (그녀와의 이별)	Kim Hyun-jung	–
Pair 3	Moaï	Kim Jun-hyun	A Little Girl (소녀)	Lee Moon-se	67
Pair 3	Korean Traditional Totem Pole	Killagramz	A Little Girl (소녀)	Lee Moon-se	32
2nd Song	Korean Traditional Totem Pole	Killagramz	The Magic Castle (마법의 성)	The Classic	–
Pair 4	Coral Girl	Kim Soo-yeon	8282	Davichi	61
Pair 4	Carp Lady	Hyejeong of AOA	8282	Davichi	38
2nd Song	Carp Lady	Hyejeong of AOA	On the Street (거리에서)	Sung Si-kyung	–

Episode 160

Episode 160 was broadcast on July 1, 2018.

Order	Stage Name	Real Name	Song	Original artist	Vote
Round 2
Pair 1	Dragon Fruit	Kangnam	At Any Time (무시로)	Na Hoon-a	42
Pair 1	David Beckham	Baekho of NU'EST	Beautiful Night (아름다운 밤이야)	BEAST	57
Pair 2	Moaï	Kim Jun-hyun	Instinctively (본능적으로)	Yoon Jong-shin & Swings	33
Pair 2	Coral Girl	Kim Soo-yeon	Speed (스피드)	Kim Gun-mo	66
3rd Song	Moaï	Kim Jun-hyun	Bongsuk (봉숙이)	Rose Motel	–
Round 3
Finalists	David Beckham	Baekho of NU'EST	I Remember (생각이 나)	Boohwal	37
Finalists	Coral Girl	Kim Soo-yeon	Request (당부)	Lee Seung-hwan	62
Final
Battle	Coral Girl	Kim Soo-yeon	Previous three songs used as voting standard		27
Battle	Bob Ross	Han Dong-geun	Breathe (한숨)	Lee Hi	72

=== 81st Generation Mask King ===
- Contestants: Lee Hye-jeong, Lee Sang-gon (Noel), Jessi, Euna Kim, Hyomin (T-ara), Lee Yong-jin, Woohyun (INFINITE), Sung Hyuk
Episodes 161 – 162

Episode 161

Episode 161 was broadcast on July 8, 2018. This marks the beginning of the Eighty-first Generation.

Order	Stage Name	Real Name	Song	Original artist	Vote
Round 1
Pair 1	Psychic Octopus	Lee Hye-jeong	Meeting (만남)	Noh Sa-yeon	21
Pair 1	World Cup Soccer Ball	Lee Sang-gon of Noel	Meeting (만남)	Noh Sa-yeon	78
2nd Song	Psychic Octopus	Lee Hye-jeong	Can't Live Without You (그대 없이는 못 살아)	Patti Kim	–
Pair 2	Laundry Fairy	Jessi	That's What I Like	Bruno Mars	50
Pair 2	Dishwashing Fairy	Euna Kim	That's What I Like	Bruno Mars	49
2nd Song	Dishwashing Fairy	Euna Kim	Toy	Block B	–
Pair 3	Cancer	Hyomin of T-ara	Love Sick (사랑앓이)	F.T. Island	62
Pair 3	The Solar System	Lee Yong-jin	Love Sick (사랑앓이)	F.T. Island	37
2nd Song	The Solar System	Lee Yong-jin	Left-handed (왼손잡이)	Panic	–
Pair 4	Salvador Dalí	Woohyun of INFINITE	Stand Up (일어나)	Kim Kwang-seok	60
Pair 4	Andy Warhol	Sung Hyuk	Stand Up (일어나)	Kim Kwang-seok	39
2nd Song	Andy Warhol	Sung Hyuk	That I Was Once by Your Side (내가 너의 곁에 잠시 살았다는 걸)	Toy	–

Episode 162

Episode 162 was broadcast on July 15, 2018.

Order	Stage Name	Real Name	Song	Original artist	Vote
Round 2
Pair 1	World Cup Soccer Ball	Lee Sang-gon of Noel	I Swear (다짐)	Jo Sung-mo	52
Pair 1	Laundry Fairy	Jessi	Eat (꺼내 먹어요)	Zion.T	47
Pair 2	Cancer	Hyomin of T-ara	I Love You (난 널 사랑해)	Shin Hyo-beom	35
Pair 2	Salvador Dalí	Woohyun of INFINITE	Whistle (휘파람)	Lee Moon-se	64
Round 3
Finalists	World Cup Soccer Ball	Lee Sang-gon of Noel	I Miss You (보고 싶다)	Kim Bum-soo	43
Finalists	Salvador Dalí	Woohyun of INFINITE	I Want to Fall in Love (사랑에 빠지고 싶다)	Johan Kim	56
Final
Battle	Salvador Dalí	Woohyun of INFINITE	Previous three songs used as voting standard		25
Battle	Bob Ross	Han Dong-geun	The Story of the Rain and You (비와 당신의 이야기)	Boohwal	74

=== 82nd Generation Mask King ===
- Contestants: Yubin (Oh My Girl), David Oh, Hwang Hye-young, Yook Jung-wan (Rose Motel), Seungri (BigBang), Rowoon (SF9), Solji (EXID), Park Kyung-lim
Episodes 163 – 164

Episode 163

Episode 163 was broadcast on July 22, 2018. This marks the beginning of the Eighty-second Generation.

Order	Stage Name	Real Name	Song	Original artist	Vote
Round 1
Pair 1	Submarine	Yubin of Oh My Girl	Some (썸)	Soyou & Junggigo	48
Pair 1	Spacecraft	David Oh	Some (썸)	Soyou & Junggigo	51
2nd Song	Submarine	Yubin of Oh My Girl	Burying My Face in Tears (눈물에 얼굴을 묻는다)	Jang Na-ra	–
Pair 2	Grinder	Hwang Hye-young	Stupid Smile (바보같은 미소)	Jo Gap-kyung	20
Pair 2	Coffee Bag	Yook Jung-wan of Rose Motel	Stupid Smile (바보같은 미소)	Jo Gap-kyung	79
2nd Song	Grinder	Hwang Hye-young	One Million Roses (백만송이 장미)	Sim Soo-bong	–
Pair 3	Hedgehog	Seungri of BigBang	Love In the Milky Way Cafe (사랑은 은하수 다방에서)	10cm	52
Pair 3	Owl	Rowoon of SF9	Love In the Milky Way Cafe (사랑은 은하수 다방에서)	10cm	47
2nd Song	Owl	Rowoon of SF9	Lie Lie Lie (거짓말 거짓말 거짓말)	Lee Juck	–
Pair 4	Dongmakgol Girl	Solji of EXID	Is There Anybody? (누구 없소)	Han Young-ae	65
Pair 4	Lady Vengeance	Park Kyung-lim	Is There Anybody? (누구 없소)	Han Young-ae	34
2nd Song	Lady Vengeance	Park Kyung-lim	Goodbye (안녕)	Park Hye-kyung	–

Episode 164

Episode 164 was broadcast on July 29, 2018.

Order	Stage Name	Real Name	Song	Original artist	Vote
Round 2
Pair 1	Spacecraft	David Oh	October Rain (힐링이 필요해)	Yoon Gun	37
Pair 1	Coffee Bag	Yook Jung-wan of Rose Motel	Grandfather and Watermelon (할아버지와 수박)	Kang San-ae	62
Pair 2	Hedgehog	Seungri of BigBang	Pinocchio (피노키오) (Pinocchio OST)	Roy Kim	21
Pair 2	Dongmakgol Girl	Solji of EXID	Can't Do (못해)	4Men ft. Mi (美)	78
Round 3
Finalists	Coffee Bag	Yook Jung-wan of Rose Motel	Only the Sound of Her Laughter (그녀의 웃음소리뿐)	Lee Moon-se	19
Finalists	Dongmakgol Girl	Solji of EXID	A Person in My Dream (몽중인)	Lena Park	80
Final
Battle	Dongmakgol Girl	Solji of EXID	Previous three songs used as voting standard		53
Battle	Bob Ross	Han Dong-geun	Thorn Tree (가시나무)	Poet and Village Head	46

=== 83rd Generation Mask King ===
- Contestants: Ji Sang-ryeol, Yoon Hee-seok, Park Ae-ri, Skull, Lee Tae-ri, Kim Tae-hyung (Click-B), Sunye (Wonder Girls), Kim Do-yeon (Weki Meki)
Episodes 165 – 166

Episode 165

Episode 165 was broadcast on August 5, 2018. This marks the beginning of the Eighty-third Generation.

Order	Stage Name	Real Name	Song	Original artist	Vote
Round 1
Pair 1	Mango	Ji Sang-ryeol	You Can (넌 할 수 있어)	Kang San-ae	27
Pair 1	Coconut	Yoon Hee-seok	You Can (넌 할 수 있어)	Kang San-ae	72
2nd Song	Mango	Ji Sang-ryeol	Sad Promise (슬픈 언약식)	Kim Jung-min	–
Pair 2	Cheetah	Park Ae-ri	My Love by My Side (내 사랑 내 곁에)	Kim Hyun-sik	53
Pair 2	Rhinoceros	Skull	My Love by My Side (내 사랑 내 곁에)	Kim Hyun-sik	46
2nd Song	Rhinoceros	Skull	Empty (공허해)	Winner	–
Pair 3	Fire Engine	Lee Tae-ri	After Send You (너를 보내고)	YB	42
Pair 3	Disinfection Truck	Kim Tae-hyung of Click-B	After Send You (너를 보내고)	YB	57
2nd Song	Fire Engine	Lee Tae-ri	Confession (고백)	Delispice	–
Pair 4	Harney	Sunye of Wonder Girls	Password 486 (비밀번호 486)	Younha	62
Pair 4	Young-shim	Doyeon of Weki Meki	Password 486 (비밀번호 486)	Younha	37
2nd Song	Young-shim	Doyeon of Weki Meki	I'm OK	Taeyeon	–

Episode 166

Episode 166 was broadcast on August 12, 2018.

Order	Stage Name	Real Name	Song	Original artist	Vote
Round 2
Pair 1	Coconut	Yoon Hee-seok	At J's Bar (J's Bar에서)	Exhibition	38
Pair 1	Cheetah	Park Ae-ri	Wearing Dark Lipstick (립스틱 짙게 바르고)	Im Joo-ri	61
Pair 2	Disinfection Truck	Kim Tae-hyung of Click-B	Expressing Affections (애정표현)	Flower	29
Pair 2	Harney	Sunye of Wonder Girls	It's Fortunate (다행이다)	Lee Juck	70
Round 3
Finalists	Cheetah	Park Ae-ri	Passionate Love (열애)	Yoon Shi-nae	32
Finalists	Harney	Sunye of Wonder Girls	Breath (숨)	Park Hyo-shin	67
Final
Battle	Harney	Sunye of Wonder Girls	Previous three songs used as voting standard		26
Battle	Dongmakgol Girl	Solji of EXID	Father (아버지)	Insooni	73

=== 84th Generation Mask King ===
- Contestants: Kim Jinhwan (iKon), Lee Soo-ji, Park Ki-young, Kriesha Chu, Gree, Jooyoung, Im Hyung-joon, Lee Hyun-seop
Episodes 167 – 168

Episode 167

Episode 167 was broadcast on September 2, 2018. This marks the beginning of the Eighty-fourth Generation.

Order	Stage Name	Real Name	Song	Original artist	Vote
Round 1
Pair 1	Motorcycle	Jinhwan of iKON	Summer Love (애타는 마음)	Ulala Session ft. IU	61
Pair 1	Duck Ship	Lee Soo-ji	Summer Love (애타는 마음)	Ulala Session ft. IU	38
2nd Song	Duck Ship	Lee Soo-ji	Love Is Always Thirsty (사랑은 언제나 목마르다)	Youme	–
Pair 2	Siren	Park Ki-young	When You Believe (The Prince of Egypt OST)	Whitney Houston & Mariah Carey	50
Pair 2	Fox With Nine Tails	Kriesha Chu	When You Believe (The Prince of Egypt OST)	Whitney Houston & Mariah Carey	49
2nd Song	Fox With Nine Tails	Kriesha Chu	Fine	Taeyeon	–
Pair 3	The Back	MC Gree	Reminiscence (회상)	Sanulrim	23
Pair 3	The Front	Jooyoung	Reminiscence (회상)	Sanulrim	76
2nd Song	The Back	MC Gree	Johnny (자니)	Primary ft. Dynamic Duo	–
Pair 4	Badminton	Im Hyung-joon	A Passionate Goodbye (뜨거운 안녕)	Toy & E Z Hyung	39
Pair 4	Archery	Lee Hyun-seop	A Passionate Goodbye (뜨거운 안녕)	Toy & E Z Hyung	60
2nd Song	Badminton	Im Hyung-joon	You to Me Again (그대 내게 다시)	Byun Jin-sub	–

Episode 168

Episode 168 was broadcast on September 9, 2018.

Order	Stage Name	Real Name	Song	Original artist	Vote
Round 2
Pair 1	Motorcycle	Jinhwan of iKON	We Make a Good Pair (우린 제법 잘 어울려요)	Sung Si-kyung	17
Pair 1	Siren	Park Ki-young	Lucille (루씰)	Han Young-ae	82
Pair 2	The Front	Jooyoung	I Didn't Weep Tears (눈물이 안났어)	Lim Jeong-hee	37
Pair 2	Archery	Lee Hyun-seop	Love over Thousand Years (천년의 사랑)	Park Wan-kyu	62
Round 3
Finalists	Siren	Park Ki-young	Last Concert (마지막 콘서트)	Lee Seung-chul	69
Finalists	Archery	Lee Hyun-seop	Promise (약속)	Kim Bum-soo	30
Final
Battle	Siren	Park Ki-young	Previous three songs used as voting standard		19
Battle	Dongmakgol Girl	Solji of EXID	How Are You (어떤가요)	Lee Jeong-bong	80

=== King of Mask Singer – "The Winners" ===
- Former Mask Kings/Queens: Johan Kim, Hong Ji-min, Sohyang, Jung Dong-ha, Hwanhee (Fly to the Sky), Sunwoo Jung-a, Kim Yeon-ji
- Special guests: Jo Jang-hyuk, Kim Ho-young, Park Jin-joo
King of Mask Singer – "The Winners"

This special program was a part of 2018 DMC Festival which was taken place at Sangam Culture Square on September 7, 2018, featured few former Mask Kings/Queens and other special guests' performances. It was re-aired on television with subtitles on September 16, 2018 in one episode.

Stage order	Performer	Song title	Original artist
Opening	Jo Jang-hyuk & Kim Ho-young	Don't Worry (걱정 말아요 그대)	Jeon In-kwon
1	Hong Ji-min	As I Say (말하는 대로)	Sagging Snail (Yoo Jae-suk & Lee Juck)
2	Hong Ji-min	Lying on the Sea (바다에 누워)	The Treble Clef
2	Kim Yeon-ji	Lying on the Sea (바다에 누워)	The Treble Clef
3	Kim Yeon-ji	We're Breaking Up (헤어지는 중입니다)	Lee Eun-mi
4	Jung Dong-ha	Mirotic (주몬-MIROTIC-)	TVXQ
5	Jung Dong-ha	Let Me Go Back (되돌려 놔줘)	Jung Dong-ha
6	Jung Dong-ha	You Raise Me Up	Secret Garden
6	Sohyang	You Raise Me Up	Secret Garden
7	Sohyang	Hug Me (안아줘)	Jung Joon-il
8	Sohyang	Song of the Wind (바람의 노래)	Cho Yong-pil
9	Johan Kim	Don't Leave Me (날 떠나지마)	Park Jin-young
10	Johan Kim	I Want to Fall in Love (사랑에 빠지고 싶다)	Johan Kim
11	Sunwoo Jung-a	Whistle (휘파람)	Blackpink
12	Sunwoo Jung-a	It's Raining (비온다)	Sunwoo Jung-a
13	Sunwoo Jung-a	Breathe (한숨)	Lee Hi
13	Park Jin-joo	Breathe (한숨)	Lee Hi
14	Park Jin-joo	Flying Duck (오리 날다)	Cherry Filter
15	Hwanhee	Don't Forget (잊지말아요)	Baek Ji-young
16	Hwanhee	Sea of Love	Fly to the Sky

=== 85th Generation Mask King ===
- Contestants: Ha Joon-seok (Ulala Session), Jung Tae-woo, Paul Potts, Nicole Jung, Yang Soo-kyung, Park Hwi-soon, Lyn, Kim Na-young (Gugudan)
Episodes 169 – 170

Episode 169

Episode 169 was broadcast on September 16, 2018. This marks the beginning of the Eighty-fifth Generation.

Order	Stage Name	Real Name	Song	Original artist	Vote
Round 1
Pair 1	The Colosseum	Ha Joon-seok of Ulala Session	After Breaking Up (헤어진 후에)	Y2K	67
Pair 1	Triumphal Arch	Jung Tae-woo	After Breaking Up (헤어진 후에)	Y2K	32
2nd Song	Triumphal Arch	Jung Tae-woo	Do You Want to Walk with Me (같이 걸을까)	Lee Juck	–
Pair 2	Justice Bao	Paul Potts	Beauty and the Beast	Celine Dion & Peabo Bryson	55
Pair 2	Farewell My Concubine	Nicole Jung	Beauty and the Beast	Celine Dion & Peabo Bryson	44
2nd Song	Farewell My Concubine	Nicole Jung	Playing with Fire (불장난)	Blackpink	–
Pair 3	Fruit Basket	Yang Soo-kyung	As Time Goes By (세월이 가면)	Choi Ho-seop	74
Pair 3	Set of Yellow Corvina	Park Hwi-soon	As Time Goes By (세월이 가면)	25	
2nd Song	Set of Yellow Corvina	Park Hwi-soon	To Fool from Fool (바보에게... 바보가)	Park Myeong-su	–
Pair 4	Longtail	Lyn	It Hurts (Slow) (아파 (Slow))	2NE1	75
Pair 4	Chameleon	Nayoung of Gugudan	It Hurts (Slow) (아파 (Slow))	2NE1	24
2nd Song	Chameleon	Nayoung of Gugudan	Piano Man	Mamamoo	–

Episode 170

Episode 170 was broadcast on September 23, 2018.

Order	Stage Name	Real Name	Song	Original artist	Vote
Round 2
Pair 1	The Colosseum	Ha Joon-seok of Ulala Session	Gift (선물)	MeloMance	47
Pair 1	Justice Bao	Paul Potts	You and I (그대 그리고 나)	Sorisae	52
Pair 2	Fruit Basket	Yang Soo-kyung	The Woman in the Rain (빗속의 여인)	Shin Jung-hyeon	34
Pair 2	Longtail	Lyn	Nocturne (야상곡)	Kim Yoon-ah	65
Round 3
Finalists	Justice Bao	Paul Potts	I Miss You (보고 싶다)	Kim Bum-soo	29
Finalists	Longtail	Lyn	Love, ing (열애중)	Ben	70
Special	Justice Bao	Paul Potts	Nessun dorma	Giacomo Puccini	–
Final
Battle	Longtail	Lyn	Previous three songs used as voting standard		30
Battle	Dongmakgol Girl	Solji of EXID	I Will Show You (보여줄게)	Ailee	69

=== 86th Generation Mask King ===
- Contestants: Sunnie Lee Kyeong (The Barberettes), Yoon San-ha (Astro), SinB (GFriend), Kang Hong-seok, Kim Ga-yeon, Baby Soul (Lovelyz), Moon Myung-jin, Yang Chi-seung
Episodes 171 – 172

Episode 171

Episode 171 was broadcast on September 30, 2018. This marks the beginning of the Eighty-sixth Generation.

Order	Stage Name	Real Name	Song	Original artist	Vote
Round 1
Pair 1	Fall Woman	Sunnie Lee Kyeong of The Barberettes	When Would It Be (언제쯤이면)	Yoon Hyun-sang & IU	68
Pair 1	Autumn Boy	Sanha of Astro	When Would It Be (언제쯤이면)	Yoon Hyun-sang & IU	31
2nd Song	Autumn Boy	Sanha of Astro	Every Day, Every Moment (모든 날, 모든 순간) (Should We Kiss First? OST)	Paul Kim	–
Pair 2	Korean Fan Dance Girl	SinB of GFriend	Scar Deeper Than Love (사랑보다 깊은 상처)	Lena Park & Yim Jae-beom	37
Pair 2	Perception Changes Boy	Kang Hong-seok	Scar Deeper Than Love (사랑보다 깊은 상처)	Lena Park & Yim Jae-beom	62
2nd Song	Korean Fan Dance Girl	SinB of GFriend	Comet (혜성)	Younha	–
Pair 3	Olive Oil	Kim Ga-yeon	Puyo Puyo (뿌요뿌요)	UP	25
Pair 3	Fondue Princess	Baby Soul of Lovelyz	Puyo Puyo (뿌요뿌요)	UP	74
2nd Song	Olive Oil	Kim Ga-yeon	Hey, Hey, Hey	Jaurim	–
Pair 4	Black Swan	Moon Myung-jin	Let's Go Travel (여행을 떠나요)	Cho Yong-pil	58
Pair 4	Egyptian God	Yang Chi-seung	Let's Go Travel (여행을 떠나요)	Cho Yong-pil	41
2nd Song	Egyptian God	Yang Chi-seung	Butterfly (나비야)	Ha Dong-kyun	–

Episode 172

Episode 172 was broadcast on October 7, 2018.

Order	Stage Name	Real Name	Song	Original artist	Vote
Round 2
Pair 1	Fall Woman	Sunnie Lee Kyeong of The Barberettes	Red (빨개요)	Hyuna	46
Pair 1	Perception Changes Boy	Kang Hong-seok	Like a Rose (그대 모습은 장미)	Min Hae-kyung	53
Pair 2	Fondue Princess	Baby Soul of Lovelyz	U R	Taeyeon	36
Pair 2	Black Swan	Moon Myung-jin	Don't Say Goodbye (안녕이라고 말하지마)	Lee Seung-chul	63
Round 3
Finalists	Perception Changes Boy	Kang Hong-seok	The Flight (비상)	Yim Jae-beom	43
Finalists	Black Swan	Moon Myung-jin	Uphill Road (오르막길)	Yoon Jong-shin ft. Jung-in	56
Final
Battle	Black Swan	Moon Myung-jin	Previous three songs used as voting standard		42
Battle	Dongmakgol Girl	Solji of EXID	Please (제발)	Lee So-ra	57

=== 87th Generation Mask King ===
- Contestants: Song Yuvin (Myteen), Seola (Cosmic Girls), Go Se-won, Jung Young-joo, Kang Sung-yeon, Oh Se-deuk, Muzie, Christian Burgos
Episodes 173 – 174

Episode 173

Episode 173 was broadcast on October 14, 2018. This marks the beginning of the Eighty-seventh Generation.

Order	Stage Name	Real Name	Song	Original artist	Vote
Round 1
Pair 1	Dabotap	Song Yuvin of Myteen	Timeless	Zhang Liyin ft. Kim Junsu	48
Pair 1	Observatory	Seola of Cosmic Girls	Timeless	Zhang Liyin ft. Kim Junsu	51
2nd Song	Dabotap	Song Yuvin of Myteen	Because You're My Girl (내 여자라니까)	Lee Seung-gi	–
Pair 2	Gung Ye	Go Se-won	Farewell Story (이별이야기)	Lee Moon-sae & Go Eun-hee	35
Pair 2	Mi-shil	Jung Young-joo	Farewell Story (이별이야기)	Lee Moon-sae & Go Eun-hee	64
2nd Song	Gung Ye	Go Se-won	I Will Give You It All (다 줄거야)	Jo Gyu-man	–
Pair 3	Uparupa	Kang Sung-yeon	I Have No Problem (나는 문제 없어)	Hwang Gyu-young	78
Pair 3	Sunfish	Oh Se-deuk	I Have No Problem (나는 문제 없어)	Hwang Gyu-young	21
2nd Song	Sunfish	Oh Se-deuk	One Thing That I Know (내가 아는 한가지)	Lee Deok-jin	–
Pair 4	Giant Chestnuts of Bread	Muzie	If You Come into My Heart (그대 내 맘에 들어오면은)	Jo Deok-bae	57
Pair 4	Mussel	Christian Burgos	If You Come into My Heart (그대 내 맘에 들어오면은)	Jo Deok-bae	42
2nd Song	Mussel	Christian Burgos	The Pierrot Laughs at Us (삐에로는 우릴 보고 웃지)	Kim Wan-sun	–

Episode 174

Episode 174 was broadcast on October 21, 2018.

Order	Stage Name	Real Name	Song	Original artist	Vote
Round 2
Pair 1	Observatory	Seola of Cosmic Girls	Rose	Lee Hi	32
Pair 1	Mi-shil	Jung Young-joo	Distant Memories of You (기억 속의 먼 그대에게)	Park Mi-kyung	67
Pair 2	Uparupa	Kang Sung-yeon	Like the First Feeling (처음 느낌 그대로)	Lee So-ra	31
Pair 2	Giant Chestnuts of Bread	Muzie	In Dreams (꿈속에서)	Exhibition	68
Round 3
Finalists	Mi-shil	Jung Young-joo	Men Came Down from the Sky Like Rain (하늘에서 남자들이 비처럼 내려와)	Bubble Sisters	33
Finalists	Giant Chestnuts of Bread	Muzie	Confession (고해)	Yim Jae-beom	66
Final
Battle	Giant Chestnuts of Bread	Muzie	Previous three songs used as voting standard		52
Battle	Dongmakgol Girl	Solji of EXID	Confession (고백)	Jung Joon-il	47

=== 88th Generation Mask King ===
- Contestants: Jo Hyun-young (Rainbow), Cheon Dan-bi, Lee Dae-hwi (Wanna One), Shorry J (Mighty Mouth), Lee Ki-chan, Kim Soo-yong, Ravi (VIXX), Ra.D
Episodes 175 – 176

Episode 175

Episode 175 was broadcast on October 28, 2018. This marks the beginning of the Eighty-eighth Generation.

Order	Stage Name	Real Name	Song	Original artist	Vote
Round 1
Pair 1	Projector	Jo Hyun-young of Rainbow	Like a Fool (바보처럼)	Bubble Sisters	28
Pair 1	Gramophone	Cheon Dan-bi	Like a Fool (바보처럼)	Bubble Sisters	71
2nd Song	Projector	Jo Hyun-young of Rainbow	No (아니)	Gummy	–
Pair 2	Joker	Lee Dae-hwi of Wanna One	Violet Fragrance (보랏빛 향기)	Kang Susie	63
Pair 2	Frankenstein	Shorry J of Mighty Mouth	Violet Fragrance (보랏빛 향기)	Kang Susie	36
2nd Song	Frankenstein	Shorry J of Mighty Mouth	Two Person (두사람)	Sung Si-kyung	–
Pair 3	Polar Bear	Lee Ki-chan	Forever with You (그대와 영원히)	Lee Moon-sae	92
Pair 3	Alpaca	Kim Soo-yong	Forever with You (그대와 영원히)	Lee Moon-sae	7
2nd Song	Alpaca	Kim Soo-yong	Somebody's Dream (어떤이의 꿈)	Bom Yeoreum Gaeul Kyeoul	–
Pair 4	Burst	Ravi of VIXX	No Make Up	Zion.T	49
Pair 4	Bubblebubble	Ra.D	No Make Up	Zion.T	50
2nd Song	Burst	Ravi of VIXX	It's Hard to Face You (그댈 마주하는건 힘들어 (그마힘))	Busker Busker	–

Episode 176

Episode 176 was broadcast on November 4, 2018.

Order	Stage Name	Real Name	Song	Original artist	Vote
Round 2
Pair 1	Gramophone	Cheon Dan-bi	It Can't Be Real (진짜일 리 없어)	Lim Jeong-hee	63
Pair 1	Joker	Lee Dae-hwi of Wanna One	Star (저 별)	Heize	36
Pair 2	Polar Bear	Lee Ki-chan	Break Away	Big Mama	39
Pair 2	Bubblebubble	Ra.D	Beautiful	Crush	60
Round 3
Finalists	Gramophone	Cheon Dan-bi	Lost Child (미아)	Lena Park	71
Finalists	Bubblebubble	Ra.D	For Thousand Days (천일동안)	Lee Seung-hwan	28
Final
Battle	Gramophone	Cheon Dan-bi	Previous three songs used as voting standard		30
Battle	Giant Chestnuts of Bread	Muzie	Rain	Lee Juck	69

=== 89th Generation Mask King ===
- Contestants: Chun Myung-hoon (NRG), Jiyoung (Bubble Sisters), Kwon Soon-il (Urban Zakapa), Kim Young-hee, Yuna (AOA), DK (iKon), Song Jae-hee, Lee Hyuk
Episodes 177 – 178

Episode 177

Episode 177 was broadcast on November 11, 2018. This marks the beginning of the Eighty-ninth Generation.

Order	Stage Name	Real Name	Song	Original artist	Vote
Round 1
Pair 1	Water Clock	Chun Myung-hoon of NRG	The Blue in You (그대 안의 블루)	Kim Hyun-chul & Lee So-ra	32
Pair 1	Sundial	Jiyoung of Bubble Sisters	The Blue in You (그대 안의 블루)	Kim Hyun-chul & Lee So-ra	67
2nd Song	Water Clock	Chun Myung-hoon of NRG	My Only Friend (나만의 친구)	Solid	–
Pair 2	Byeoljubujeon	Kwon Soon-il of Urban Zakapa	Only the Words That I Love You (사랑해, 이 말 밖엔...)	Rich	75
Pair 2	The Sun and Moon	Kim Young-hee	Only the Words That I Love You (사랑해, 이 말 밖엔...)	Rich	24
2nd Song	The Sun and Moon	Kim Young-hee	Malri Flower (말리꽃)	Lee Seung-chul	–
Pair 3	Great Score	Yuna of AOA	With You Everyday (매일 그대와)	Deulgukhwa	54
Pair 3	Passing	Donghyuk of iKon	With You Everyday (매일 그대와)	Deulgukhwa	45
2nd Song	Passing	Donghyuk of iKon	The Manual (너 사용법)	Eddy Kim	–
Pair 4	General	Song Jae-hee	You Stay in Love (그대 사랑안에 머물러)	Kim Jung-min	45
Pair 4	Goblin	Lee Hyuk	You Stay in Love (그대 사랑안에 머물러)	Kim Jung-min	54
2nd Song	General	Song Jae-hee	Rain and You (비와 당신)	Park Joong-hoon	–

Episode 178

Episode 178 was broadcast on November 18, 2018.

Order	Stage Name	Real Name	Song	Original artist	Vote
Round 2
Pair 1	Sundial	Jiyoung of Bubble Sisters	Blood Sweat & Tears (피 땀 눈물)	BTS	57
Pair 1	Byeoljubujeon	Kwon Soon-il of Urban Zakapa	I Know Everything (다 알아요)	Yangpa	42
3rd Song	Byeoljubujeon	Kwon Soon-il of Urban Zakapa	Maria	Kim Ah-joong	–
Pair 2	Great Score	Yuna of AOA	You Are Different (Nonstop 4 OST) (그댄 달라요)	Han Ye-seul	29
Pair 2	Goblin	Lee Hyuk	I Shout Myself (나를 외치다)	Maya	70
Round 3
Finalists	Sundial	Jiyoung of Bubble Sisters	If It Is You (Another Miss Oh OST) (너였다면)	Jung Seung-hwan	47
Finalists	Goblin	Lee Hyuk	Julie	Yim Jae-beom	52
Final
Battle	Goblin	Lee Hyuk	Previous three songs used as voting standard		46
Battle	Giant Chestnuts of Bread	Muzie	Love...That Person (사랑.. 그 놈)	Bobby Kim	53

=== 90th Generation Mask King ===
- Contestants: Lee So-jeong, Great Library, Kim Ji-min, Jinyoung (Got7), Jo Moon-geun, Jung Dae-gwang (Voisper), Lee Hyun, Moonbyul (Mamamoo)
Episodes 179 – 180

Episode 179

Episode 179 was broadcast on November 25, 2018. This marks the beginning of the Ninetieth Generation.

Order	Stage Name	Real Name	Song	Original artist	Vote
Round 1
Pair 1	Dancheong	Lee So-jeong	In the Rain (빗속에서)	Lee Moon-sae	76
Pair 1	Stained Glass	Great Library	In the Rain (빗속에서)	Lee Moon-sae	23
2nd Song	Stained Glass	Great Library	Even If You Get Cheated by World (세상이 그대를 속일지라도)	Kim Jang-hoon	–
Pair 2	Honeybee	Kim Ji-min	I Don't Love You (널 사랑하지 않아)	Urban Zakapa	27
Pair 2	Rabbit	Jinyoung of Got7	I Don't Love You (널 사랑하지 않아)	Urban Zakapa	72
2nd Song	Honeybee	Kim Ji-min	I'll Give the Love That Stays with Me (내게 남은 사랑을 드릴게요)	Jang Hye-ri	–
Pair 3	Bach	Jo Moon-geun	At the Door of the World (세상의 문 앞에서)	Exhibition ft. Shin Hae-chul	46
Pair 3	Schubert	Daegwang of Voisper	At the Door of the World (세상의 문 앞에서)	Exhibition ft. Shin Hae-chul	53
2nd Song	Bach	Jo Moon-geun	Love Game (요즘 바쁜가봐)	2BiC	–
Pair 4	Eagle	Lee Hyun	Good Person (좋은 사람)	Toy ft. Kim Hyung-joong	67
Pair 4	Swan	Moonbyul of Mamamoo	Good Person (좋은 사람)	Toy ft. Kim Hyung-joong	32
2nd Song	Swan	Moonbyul of Mamamoo	The Song (노래)	Zion.T	–

Episode 180

Episode 180 was broadcast on December 2, 2018.

Order	Stage Name	Real Name	Song	Original artist	Vote
Round 2
Pair 1	Dancheong	Lee So-jeong	Faraway, My Honey (님은 먼 곳에)	Kim Choo-ja	65
Pair 1	Rabbit	Jinyoung of Got7	Romance (연애)	Kim Hyun-chul	34
Pair 2	Schubert	Daegwang of Voisper	Love is Like a Snowflake (사랑은 눈꽃처럼)	Xia Junsu	47
Pair 2	Eagle	Lee Hyun	Things That I Can't Do for You (해줄 수 없는 일)	Park Hyo-shin	52
Round 3
Finalists	Dancheong	Lee So-jeong	Miss Havisham'ss Waltz (하비샴의 왈츠)	Lena Park	32
Finalists	Eagle	Lee Hyun	If by Chance (Jeon Woo-sung solo) (만약에 말야)	Noel	67
Final
Battle	Eagle	Lee Hyun	Previous three songs used as voting standard		54
Battle	Giant Chestnuts of Bread	Muzie	You're the One (너뿐이야)	J. Y. Park	45

=== 91st Generation Mask King ===
- Contestants: Kim Kyung-ran, Navi, Shaun (The Koxx), Lee Jae-jin (F.T. Island), Ahn Da-eun (The Ade), An Yu-jin (Iz*One), Lim Ju-eun, Lim Han-byul
Episodes 181 – 182

Episode 181

Episode 181 was broadcast on December 9, 2018. This marks the beginning of the Ninety-first Generation.

Order	Stage Name	Real Name	Song	Original artist	Vote
Round 1
Pair 1	New York Taxi	Kim Kyung-ran	Belief (믿음)	Lee So-ra	20
Pair 1	London Bus	Navi	Belief (믿음)	Lee So-ra	79
2nd Song	New York Taxi	Kim Kyung-ran	One Late Night in 1994 (1994년 어느 늦은 밤)	Jang Hye-jin	–
Pair 2	Haitai	Shaun of The Koxx	Wave (파도)	UN	58
Pair 2	Phoenix	Lee Jae-jin of F.T. Island	Wave (파도)	UN	41
2nd Song	Phoenix	Lee Jae-jin of F.T. Island	Please Find Her (그녀를 찾아주세요)	The Name	–
Pair 3	The First Snow of the Season	Ahn Da-eun of The Ade	Across the Universe (우주를 건너)	Baek Ye-rin	67
Pair 3	Icicle	An Yu-jin of Iz One	Across the Universe (우주를 건너)	Baek Ye-rin	32
2nd Song	Icicle	An Yu-jin of Iz One	You, Clouds, Rain (비도 오고 그래서)	Heize ft. Shin Yong-jae	–
Pair 4	Princess Biona	Lim Ju-eun	Habit (습관 (Bye Bye))	Roller Coaster	35
Pair 4	Green Monster	Lim Han-byul	Habit (습관 (Bye Bye))	Roller Coaster	64
2nd Song	Princess Biona	Lim Ju-eun	Because I'm a Girl (여자이니까)	Kiss	–

Episode 182

Episode 182 was broadcast on December 16, 2018.

Order	Stage Name	Real Name	Song	Original artist	Vote
Round 2
Pair 1	London Bus	Navi	Heartsore Story (가슴 시린 이야기)	Wheesung ft. Yong Jun-hyung	69
Pair 1	Haitai	Shaun of The Koxx	View	Shinee	30
Pair 2	The First Snow of the Season	Ahn Da-eun of The Ade	Confession (고백)	Jang Na-ra	58
Pair 2	Green Monster	Lim Han-byul	I Will Go to You Like the First Snow (첫눈처럼 너에게 가겠다)	Ailee	41
Round 3
Finalists	London Bus	Navi	The Reason I Became a Singer (가수가 된 이유)	Shin Yong-jae	33
Finalists	The First Snow of the Season	Ahn Da-eun of The Ade	In the Beauty Salon (미장원에서)	Lena Park	66
Final
Battle	The First Snow of the Season	Ahn Da-eun of The Ade	Previous three songs used as voting standard		37
Battle	Eagle	Lee Hyun	Don't Go, Don't Go (가지마 가지마)	Brown Eyes	62

=== 92nd Generation Mask King ===
- Contestants: Na Sung-ho (Noel), Sangyeon (The Boyz), Lee Kwang-gi, Choi Jung-hoon (Jannabi), Stella Jang, Jo Jung-chi, Lisa, Nam Chang-hee
Episodes 183 – 184

Episode 183

Episode 183 was broadcast on December 23, 2018. This marks the beginning of the Ninety-second Generation.

Order	Stage Name	Real Name	Song	Original artist	Vote
Round 1
Pair 1	Chimney	Na Sung-ho of Noel	Because It's Christmas (크리스마스니까)	Sung Si-kyung, Park Hyo-shin, Lee Seok-hoon, Seo In-guk and VIXX	57
Pair 1	Fireplace	Sangyeon of The Boyz	Because It's Christmas (크리스마스니까)	Sung Si-kyung, Park Hyo-shin, Lee Seok-hoon, Seo In-guk and VIXX	42
2nd Song	Fireplace	Sangyeon of The Boyz	Bit by Bit (점점)	Brown Eyes	–
Pair 2	Candy Guy	Lee Kwang-gi	White Winter (하얀 겨울)	Mr. 2	35
Pair 2	Ginger Man	Choi Jung-hoon of Jannabi	White Winter (하얀 겨울)	Mr. 2	64
2nd Song	Candy Guy	Lee Kwang-gi	I Loved You (사랑했어요)	Kim Hyun-sik	–
Pair 3	Figure Queen	Stella Jang	Last Christmas	Wham!	73
Pair 3	Ski Jump	Jo Jung-chi	Last Christmas	Wham!	26
2nd Song	Ski Jump	Jo Jung-chi	Mackerel (고등어)	Lucid Fall	–
Pair 4	Magic Girl	Lisa	Must Have Love	SG Wannabe & Brown Eyed Girls	68
Pair 4	Magic Boy	Nam Chang-hee	Must Have Love	SG Wannabe & Brown Eyed Girls	31
2nd Song	Magic Boy	Nam Chang-hee	Untitled, 2014 (무제 (無題))	G-Dragon	–

Episode 184

Episode 184 was broadcast on December 30, 2018.

Order	Stage Name	Real Name	Song	Original artist	Vote
Round 2
Pair 1	Chimney	Na Sung-ho of Noel	Sick and Sick Name (아프고 아픈 이름...)	Ann	38
Pair 1	Ginger Man	Choi Jung-hoon of Jannabi	Facing the Desolate Love (사랑 그 쓸쓸함에 대하여)	Yang Hee-eun	61
Pair 2	Figure Queen	Stella Jang	Come Back to Me (와줘..)	Se7en	29
Pair 2	Magic Girl	Lisa	Love Rain (사랑비)	Kim Tae-woo	70
Round 3
Finalists	Ginger Man	Choi Jung-hoon of Jannabi	Heeya (희야)	Boohwal	45
Finalists	Magic Girl	Lisa	That's Only My World (그것만이 내 세상)	Deulgukhwa	54
Final
Battle	Magic Girl	Lisa	Previous three songs used as voting standard		34
Battle	Eagle	Lee Hyun	As We Live (살다가)	SG Wannabe	65
