= Winter Flower =

Single by Younha featuring RM

from the album Unstable Mindset
- Released: January 6, 2020
- Genre: Rock
- Length: 3:36
- Label: C9 Entertainment
- Songwriters: Younha, RM, EDEN
- Composers: EDEN, Ollounder, LEEZ

Younha singles chronology
"On a Rainy Day" (2019)	"Winter Flower" (2020)	"Like Fire" (2020)

RM singles chronology
"Seoul Town Road" (2019)	"Winter Flower" (2020)	"Don’t (with eAeon)" (2021)

Music video
- "Winter Flower" on YouTube

Winter Flower (Korean: 겨울꽃; stylized as WINTER FLOWER) is a song by South Korean singer-songwriter Younha, featuring South Korean rapper RM. It was released on January 6, 2020, as the first track of Younha's fifth extended play, Unstable Mindset. RM also contributed to the song's lyrics and performed the rap verse.

== Background and release ==
Younha and RM had discussed collaborating for several years before Winter Flower was recorded. Younha said that she had wanted to work with RM but had not found a suitable subject or music that would create sufficient synergy before formally proposing the collaboration.

The collaboration was announced on December 30, 2019, when Younha's agency confirmed that Winter Flower would be the first track on her upcoming extended play Unstable Mindset and would feature RM.

Because of their schedules, Younha and RM worked remotely during the production of the song. Younha said that they communicated by telephone and exchanged extensive written discussions by email concerning the subject of the lyrics before completing the song.

Younha later discussed the collaboration on the KBS2 music program You Hee-yeol's Sketchbook, saying that RM sent a lengthy response after she contacted him about the song. She described their communication as an exchange of ideas about the lyrics and subject matter.

Winter Flower was released on January 6, 2020, as the first track of Unstable Mindset, a five-track extended play that followed Younha's July 2019 release Stable Mindset.

== Composition and lyrics ==
Winter Flower is a rock song that combines Younha's vocals with RM's rap. Music critic Son Ki-ho of IZM described the song as establishing the thematic direction of Unstable Mindset, contrasting its heavier sound with the more hopeful tone of Younha's previous album. He noted the prominent bass and drum lines, supported by piano and synthesizer.

The song uses the image of a flower blooming during winter as a metaphor for enduring hardship. The flower is depicted as representing a figure searching for answers while reflecting on past difficulties and an unresolved present.

Winter Flower addresses mental health, emotional support and resilience. It characterized RM's verse as reflecting on struggle and perseverance, while describing Younha's chorus as offering reassurance and support.

The song's lyrics were written by Younha, RM and EDEN, while the composition was credited to EDEN, Ollounder and LEEZ.

== Music video ==
An animated music video for Winter Flower was released on February 25, 2020, through Younha's official YouTube channel to commemorate the song surpassing 10 million streams on Spotify.

The music video was produced as an animation depicting a girl enduring a snowstorm as a flower blooms. The animation represents the song's poetic lyrics and imagery of a flower blooming despite a harsh winter into visual form.

The video combines the imagery of the girl and the blooming flower with Younha's vocals and RM's rap, reinforcing the song's theme of enduring difficult circumstances.

== Reception ==
Winter Flower received attention in South Korea and internationally following its release. On January 7, 2020, the song had topped the iTunes Top Songs chart in 43 countries and regions and entered the top 10 in 70 countries and regions. It also became the first release by a South Korean female soloist to reach number one on the U.S. iTunes Top Songs chart.

On the South Korean music charts, Winter Flower reached number one on Bugs shortly after its release. The song reached number two on Soribada and Vibe.

Winter Flower debuted at number one on the Billboard World Digital Song Sales chart for the week ending January 18, 2020.

Headline Planet later included Winter Flower in its "Should Have Been Pop Hits" series. The publication praised the song's melody, lyrics, Younha's vocal performance and RM's rap, and described the production as combining pop, modern rock and hip-hop elements.

== Live performances ==
Younha performed Winter Flower on the KBS2 music program Music Bank on January 17, 2020. The performance marked the song's first appearance on a music program, and Younha performed it alongside CIX member BX.

Younha also appeared on the KBS2 music program You Hee-yeol's Sketchbook on January 10, 2020, where she discussed the collaboration with RM and the process of developing the song. She said that she had sent RM a lengthy email describing what she wanted to convey through the song and received a similarly detailed response from him.

== Later versions ==
In September 2022, South Korean singer Kim Seon-you performed Winter Flower on the JTBC competition program The Second World. Her performance was broadcast during the program's third episode on September 13, 2022.

Seon-you's version was released digitally on September 14, 2022, as part of the soundtrack for The Second World Episode 3.

== Credits and personnel ==
Credits adapted from the song's official release metadata and Korean music-service listings.

- Younha – vocals, lyrics
- RM – featured vocals, lyrics
- EDEN – lyrics, composition, arrangement
- Ollounder – composition, arrangement
- LEEZ – composition, arrangement

== Charts ==
Weekly chart performance
Chart (2020)	Peak position
South Korea (Circle)	48
South Korea Download Chart	33
South Korea K-pop Hot 100 (Billboard)	30
UK Official Singles Downloads Chart (OCC)	49
UK Official Singles Sales Chart (OCC)	50
US World Digital Song Sales (Billboard)	1

== See also ==
- Younha discography
- RM discography
