= Lost in Love (Younha EP) =

EP by Younha
- Released: December 9, 2010
- Genre: Pop
- Language: Korean
- Label: Lion Media/KT Music

Younha chronology
Part B: Growing Season (2009)	Lost in Love (2010)	Supersonic (2012)

Lost in Love is the first extended play by South Korean singer Younha. The album was released on December 9, 2010.

== Track listing ==
1. 기다리다 (waiting) (Note: the song was a track from her korean debut single album "Audition")
2. 말도안돼 (No Way/ Can't Believe It) - Personal Taste OST
3. 원샷 (One Shot Ft. Ju Seok)
4. 꿈속에서 (In My Dreams) - Pokémon: Zoroark: Master of Illusions OST
5. 내 남자친구를부탁해 (Please Take Care Of My Boyfriend) (lyrics written by Hwayobi)
