= Touch / Yume no Tsuzuki =

"タッチ / 夢の続き" "Touch / Yume no Tsuzuki"

Single by Younha

from the album Go! Younha (album)
- Released: September 7, 2005
- Genre: J-pop

Younha singles chronology
"Motto Futari de" (2005)	"タッチ / 夢の続き" "Touch / Yume no Tsuzuki" (2005)	"My Lover" (2005)

"Touch" / "Yume no Tsuzuki" (タッチ / 夢の続き) is the fourth single of Younha released on September 7, 2005. It is a cover of the opening theme of Touch originally by Yoshimi Iwasaki. The single peaked at number 14 on the Oricon Singles Chart.

== Track listing ==
1. Touch (タッチ)
2. Yume no Tsuzuki (夢の続き)
3. Touch (instrumental) (タッチ(instrumental))
4. Yume no Tsuzuki (instrumental) (夢の続き(instrumental))
