= Rescue (Younha album) =

RescuE

Studio album by Younha
- Released: December 27, 2017
- Genre: R&B; pop
- Length: 38:16
- Language: Korean
- Label: Loen Entertainment
- Producer: GroovyRoom

Younha chronology
Subsonic (2013)	RescuE (2017)	Stable Mindset (2019)

Rescue (stylized as RescuE) is a studio album released by South Korean singer Younha. It was released on December 27, 2017, through Loen Entertainment. It consists of eleven tracks, including the lead single "Rescue".

== Production ==
The album was produced by GroovyRoom.

== Track listing ==
Rescue track listing
No.	Title	Writer(s)	Composer(s)	Length
1.	"Rescue"	Younha; The Koxx	Younha; BOYCOLD	3:35
2.	"Hello (종이비행기) (Feat. pH-1)"	Kim Eana; Younha	Younha; GroovyRoom	3:20
3.	"Parade"	Seo Ji-eum	GroovyRoom	3:26
4.	"Like Nothing (없던 일처럼)"	GroovyRoom	Younha; GroovyRoom	3:13
5.	"Airplane Mode"	Younha	AVIN; Younha	4:33
6.	"Foresight Dream (예지몽)"	Younha	DAVII	3:33
7.	"Feel (feat. Chancellor)"	Sik-K; Chancellor	Vangdale; Chancellor	2:43
8.	"Drive"	Younha	Younha; BOYCOLD	3:13
9.	"Go (가)"	Kriz; pigma	B R L L N T; Kriz	2:40
10.	"No Answer (답을 찾지 못한 날)"	Younha	Younha	3:53
11.	"Propose"	Younha; Brother Su	Brother Su	3:36
Total length:				38:16

== Charts ==
The album peaked at number 6 on the Gaon Albums Chart in 2017.

== Reception ==
Billboard ranked the album eighth in its list of the top 25 greatest K-pop albums of the 2010s, describing it as "a cathartic listening experience that reflected on hard times and hinted to the brightness beyond them".
