= Hitotsu Sora no Shita =

2010 album by Younha

Studio album by Younha
- Released: September 22, 2010
- Genre: Pop
- Language: Japanese
- Label: Geneon Universal

Younha chronology
Part B: Growing Season (2009)	Hitotsu Sora no Shita (2010)

Hitotsu Sora no Shita (Japanese: ひとつ空の下; Under the Same Sky) is a studio album by Korean singer Younha, released on September 22, 2010. The previously released singles "Girl" and "Sukinanda" were included in the album.

== Track listing ==
1. Wind
2. Tomatoes sun ("SOLiVE24" of Weathernews official support song)
3. I like - Sukinanda (Kanagawa "saku saku" ED Theme)
4. What is goodbye? (Depapepe Younha song collaboration)
5. Soratomo - look up at the sky ("SOLiVE24" official support song (Note: the lyrics were written by the weather reporters of Weathernews.) )
6. Girl (TV Asahi, "Beat Takeshi's TV Tackle" ED Theme)
7. Complicated
8. Daily Daily
9. Remember(記憶, lit. "Memory" transliterated as kioku) (JapaneseTV anime series "RIDEBACK" ED Theme) (Note: originally track 2 from Someday (Younha album))
10. Hold Your Hand
11. End of the rainbow (the movie "On Next Sunday" theme song.)
12. All lies
