= Go! Younha =

Studio album by Younha
- Released: October 5, 2005
- Recorded: 2005
- Genre: Pop, rock
- Label: Sony Japan

Younha chronology
Go! Younha (2005)	SONGS -Teen's Collection- (2008)

Go! Younha is the first official album by pop/rock singer Younha, released on October 5, 2005. The album title is a pun on her Korean name, 고윤하 (Go Yoon-ha).

== Track listing ==
1. Houkiboshi - Album Mix Version (ほうき星 - Album Mix Version)
2. Motto Futari de (もっとふたりで)
3. Orenji no Hatsukoi (オレンジの初恋)
4. Aoi Lemon (碧い檸檬)
5. Yubikiri - Japanese Version (ゆびきり - 日本語version)
6. Himawari (向日葵)
7. My Lover (マイ☆ラバ)
8. Yume no Tsuzuki - Album Version (夢の続き - Album Version)
9. Ashita, Tenki ni Nare (あした、天気になれ)
10. Aiaigasa (相合傘)
11. Negai wa Hitotsu (願いはひとつ)
12. Omoide ni Dekinai (思い出にできない)
13. Touch (タッチ)
