= Subsonic (EP) =

EP by Younha
- Released: December 6, 2013
- Genre: Rock, pop rock
- Language: Korean
- Label: Wealive, CJ E&M Music

Younha chronology
Just Listen (2013)	Subsonic (2013)	People (2014)

Subsonic is the third extended play by South Korean singer Younha. The album was released on December 6, 2013, and is her eleventh non-compilation release.

== Creation and promotion ==
The mini album was part of a series of albums Younha released following a self-imposed hiatus due to panic disorder. It was also the third release following the annulment of Younha's contract with Lion Media after well-documented litigation. The tracks were all recorded and released during Younha's stint as host for MBC radio program Starry Night. It has been stated by the artist as a departure from her early career as a mainstream radio mainstay, and thematically reflects a relief from the pressure of maintaining popularity while also pursuing other genres. The album's title and subsequent songs make references to subsonic phenomena, thematically alluding to concepts of speed, movement, and time, especially in contrast to Younha's previous album Supersonic, which generally contains more guitar-driven, faster tempo music than Subsonic.

Three tracks were previewed ahead of the album's release, including a down-tempo version of Run from the Supersonic album and It's Okay. A music video was then released for Home. A clip featuring behind-the-scenes footage of the filming of the music videos were also released as a preview.

Following the release of the digital album, a music video debuted for the third track, Not There. Physical copies were made available on December 12, 2014

== Performances ==
Younha later held a piano-focused concerts, titled "26 and", at Olympic Hall on December 27–28, 2014. She also performed select songs from the album for You Hee-yeol's Sketchbook.

== Reception ==
The album reached No. 5 in physical albums sales during the week following its release; and the album reached No. 13 for physical album sales for the month with 9,705 copies sold on the Gaon Music Chart for December 2013. Singles It's Okay peaked at No. 9 while Not There reached No. 13 on the Gaon Charts.

== Track listing ==
No.	Title	Lyrics	Music	Length
1.	"시간을 믿었어 Timeless"	Younha	Younha	4:59
2.	"Subsonic"	김용 Kim Yong	Score	5:27
3.	"없어 Not there(feat. 이루펀트 Eluphant))"	Kim Eana	Score	3:29
4.	"괜찮다 Please Tell Me"	Kim Eana	Score	4:53
5.	"아픈 슬픔 Tears"	Luvan(백찬)	Score, Megatone	3:53
6.	"Home"	Younha	Younha	3:58
7.	"Run (Physical Only)"	Ra. D, 배지나 "Bae Ji Na"	Score	4:48
Total length:				31:27
