= Hyeseong =

Studio album by Younha
- Released: October 23, 2007
- Recorded: 2007
- Genre: Pop; rock
- Length: 67:47
- Label: Seoul Records

Younha chronology
The Perfect Day to Say I Love You (2007)	Hyeseong (2007)	Someday (2008)

Hyeseong (Korean: 혜성; lit. "Comet") is the "1.5th" "special" studio album by South Korean singer Younha. It was released on October 23, 2007, through Seoul Records. It is the remake of her Japanese debut studio album Go! Younha with a few track list changes.

== Track listing ==
Hyeseong track listing
No.	Title	Lyrics	Music	Arrangement	Length
1.	"Hyeseong" (혜성)	Kim Ea-jin	Nao Tanaka	Tanaka	3:15
2.	"Jom Deo Duriseo" (좀 더 둘이서)	Yun Hong-eun [Hey]	Tamura	Tamura	4:06
3.	"Cheonnune" (첫눈에)	Shim Jae-hee	Hwang Chan-hee	Yang Kyung-joo	4:42
4.	"Touch"	Yun	Hiroaki Serizawa	Yoshihito Onda	3:06
5.	"Han Usan Arae" (한 우산 아래)	Yun	Mano Doi	Doi	5:17
6.	"Soneul Jabgoseo" (손을 잡고서)	Lee Soop	By Mo'Doo-	By Mo'Doo-	3:56
7.	"If"	Kim Jeong-eun; Younha	Mool & Yugi	Mool & Yugi	5:23
8.	"Naeildo Malgeun Haneulcheoreom" (내일도 맑은 하늘처럼)	Yun	Tamura	Tamura	4:12
9.	"Yaksok" (약속)	Kim Jeong-eun; Younha	Teppei Shimizu	Shimizu	4:50
10.	"Haebaragi" (해바라기)	Yun	Ryo Eguchi	Eguchi	4:46
11.	"Paranbit Lemon" (파란 빛 레몬)	Lee	Bice	Ken Matsubara	6:04
12.	"Orange Cheotsarang" (오렌지 첫사랑)	Yun; Lee	Nao Tanaka	Nao Tanaka	4:11
13.	"Chueogeun Areumdaun Gieok" (추억은 아름다운 기억)	Lee; Younha	Kouhei Koyama	Yoshiyuki Sahashi	6:03
14.	"Hyeseong" (instrumental)		Tanaka	Tanaka	3:16
15.	"Cheonnune" (instrumental)		Hwang	Yang	4:40
Total length:					67:47
