= Someday (Younha album) =

Studio album by Younha
- Released: August 28, 2008
- Recorded: 2008
- Genre: Pop
- Length: 60:46.93
- Language: Korean
- Label: Lion Media/LOEN
- Producer: 박상용

Younha chronology
Comet (2007)	Someday (2008)	Part A: Peace Love & Ice Cream (2009)

Someday is Younha's second Korean album, released on August 28, 2008. It is her first album to include an entirely English track (My Song and...).

== Track listing ==
1. Gossip Boy
2. 기억 "Memory"(feat. Tablo) - Rap Mix version (Note: The Japanese version of the song is listed as the 9th track in Hitotsu Sora no Shita, which was the Ending theme for the Japanese TV series "RIDEBACK", which is an anime adaptation of the original manga.)
3. Hero
4. Someday
5. 텔레파시 "Telepathy"
6. Rain & The Bar
7. 빗소리 "The Sound Of Rain"
8. Rainbow
9. Best Friend
10. Strawberry Days
11. For Catharina (Note: Catharina is younha's baptismal name.)
12. 미워하다 "Hating"
13. My Song and...
14. 울지마요 "Don't Cry"
15. 기억 (Original Mix) "Memory (Original Mix)"
16. 텔레파시 (Instrumental) "Telepathy (Instrumental)"
17. 미워하다 (Instrumental) "Hating (Instrumental)"
