= Just Listen (EP) =

EP by Younha
- Released: May 2, 2013
- Recorded: 2013
- Genre: Rock, pop rock
- Language: Korean
- Label: Wealive/CJ E&M Music

Younha chronology
Supersonic (2012)	Just Listen (2013)	Subsonic (2013)

Just Listen is the second extended play by South Korean singer Younha.

== Background and release ==
A week before the release of the album a video was revealed on the list of artists participating.

== Track listing ==
The track listing and credits were revealed online on the day of release.

No.	Title	Lyrics	Music	Length
1.	"Just Listen" (featuring Skull)	Younha, Skull	Score, Skull	3:40
2.	"Fireworks"	Younha	THE KOXX	3:10
3.	"The Reason We Broke Up" (우리가 헤어진 진짜 이유)	Kim Eana	Score, Younha	5:15
4.	"There Was Spring" (봄은 있었다)	Lyn	Younha, Ophelia	5:55
5.	"It's Not Like That/Unacceptable" (아니야)	Naul	Naul	4:59
6.	"One Fine Day"	Yoon Do Hyun	Yoon Do Hyun	3:29
7.	"Sea Child" (바다아이)	Jo Hyuna, Ophelia	Kwon Soonil, Ophelia, Younha	4:25
