= Part A: Peace Love & Ice Cream =

3rd Album Part A: Peace Love & Ice Cream

Studio album by Younha
- Released: April 16, 2009
- Recorded: 2009
- Genre: Pop rock
- Language: Korean
- Label: Lion Media; Doremi Media (now KT Music)

Younha chronology
Someday (2008)	3rd Album Part A: Peace Love & Ice Cream (2009)	Part B: Growing Season (2009)

3rd Album Part A: Peace Love & Ice Cream is the third Korean studio album by pop/rock singer Younha, released on April 16, 2009. This album introduced a cuter, more girly image of Younha, as evidenced by the album's cover and music video for the first single off the album, "1,2,3".

== Track listing ==
1. "Peace Love & Ice Cream" (Bart Voncken, Tony Cornelissen) - 3:14 (Note: "Peace Love & Ice Cream" was originally released by Dutch pop singer Sandy Dane(as "Peace, Love & Ice Cream") on a 2008 single of the same name; Younha's version, while being instrumentally similar, is lyrically different.)
2. "Black Rain" - 0:41 (Note: intro track to the track "Break Out".)
3. "Break Out" (Fredrik Hult, Shusui Kosugi, Tebey) - 4:05
4. "1,2,3" (Fredrik Hult, Shusui Kosugi, Carl Utbult, Vince Degiorgio) - 3:27
5. "She is" (Younha) - 2:05
6. "사랑하다" (Saranghada, "Loves") (심재희, Younha) - 3:30
7. "Luv U Luv U Luv U" (이숲, 이관) - 3:09
8. "My Song and... (Korean Ver.)" (이숲, 김보민) - 3:22
9. "1,2,3 (Instrumental)" - 3:27
10. "사랑하다 (Instrumental)" - 3:30
