= Supersonic (Younha album) =

Studio album by Younha
- Released: July 3, 2012
- Genre: Rock, pop rock
- Language: Korean
- Label: Wealive, A&G Modes

Younha chronology
Lost In Love (2010)	Supersonic (2012)	Just Listen (2013)

Supersonic is a studio album by Korean singer Younha, released on July 3, 2012. While technically her fifth Korean album, it is her fourth album as a whole.

== Track listing ==
1. "Supersonic" (Note: The song was used as the opening theme of the korean airing of the animeArata: The Legend.)
2. "People"
3. "Rock Like Stars"(featuring Tiger JK)
4. "Run"(Lyrics written by Ra.D)
5. "No Limit"
6. "소나기"(Sonagi 'shower')
7. "우린 달라졌을까"(Urin Dallajyeoseulkka 'Would we have changed' )(with John Park)
8. "Set Me Free"
9. "크림소스 파스타"(Keurimsoseu Paseuta 'Cream sauce pasta')
10. "기다려줘"(Gidaryeojwo 'Wait for me')
11. "Driver"(featuring Jay Park)
12. "Hope"
