= Part B: Growing Season =

Studio album by Younha
- Released: December 11, 2009
- Genre: Pop, pop rock, R&B
- Language: Korean
- Label: Lion Media/KT Music

Younha chronology
Part A: Peace Love & Ice Cream (2009)	Part B: Growing Season (2009)	Lost In Love (2010)

3rd Album Part B: Growing Season is a studio album by Korean singer Younha, released on December 11, 2009. While technically her fourth Korean album, it is only a part of the third album as a whole, as referenced by the album title.

== Track listing ==
1. "Say Something" (Colette Trudeau, Davor Vulama, Younha) - 3:21
2. "오늘 헤어졌어요" (Oneul Heeojyeosseoyo, "Broke up today") (이관, hwayobi) - 4:21
3. "좋아해" (Joahae, "I like you") (Gustav Efraimsson, Vincent Digiorgio, Le Pont, NANA) - 3:02
4. "편한가봐" (Pyeonhangabwa, "Must be easy") (You Hee-yeol, 양재선) - 4:54
5. "헤어진 후에야 알 수 있는 것" (duet with Kim Bum Soo) (Hae-eo-jin hueya al su itneun geot, "Something that can be understood after a breakup") (이관, NANA) - 3:47
6. "LaLaLa" (Younha) - 3:09
7. "스물두 번째 길" (Seumuldu beonjjae gil, "22nd street") (Younha, 비가 내리면) - 3:21
8. "오늘 헤어졌어요 (Inst.)" - 4:21
9. "헤어진 후에야 알 수 있는 것 (Inst.)" - 3:47
