= The Perfect Day to Say I Love You =

2007 studio album by Younha

Studio album by Younha
- Released: March 15, 2007
- Recorded: 2007
- Genre: Pop
- Language: Korean
- Label: YBM Seoul

Younha chronology
The Perfect Day to Say I Love You (2007)	Comet (2007)

The Perfect Day to Say I Love You (Korean: 고백하기 좋은 날; RR: Gobaekhagi joeun nal) is the first Korean-language studio album by South Korean singer Younha. It was released on March 15, 2007, through YBM Seoul Records (now known as Kakao M), shortly after her Korean debut with "Audition".

On June 26, 2007, a special edition of her first album titled Younha Vol.1 Repackage Album - The Perfect Day to Say I Love You was released. This edition comes with a photo book and three new tracks, one of which is a Korean version of her 2005 single "My Lover".

== Awards ==
"Password 486" garnered Younha the Best New Artist award at the 2007 Mnet KM Music Festival. It was also nominated for the Digital Song Bonsang at the 22nd Golden Disc Awards.

== Track listing ==
The Perfect Day to Say I Love You track listing
No.	Title	Length
1.	"Delete"	3:39
2.	"Child - I Cry" (꼬마 - I Cry)	4:11
3.	"Password 486" (비밀번호 486)	3:47
4.	"A Perfect Day to Say I Love You" (고백하기 좋은 날)	5:11
5.	"Hello beautiful day"	3:44
6.	"Just Today" (오늘만)	4:17
7.	"Love Condition" (연애조건)	4:28
8.	"Fly"	3:24
9.	"Innermost Feelings" (속마음)	4:40
10.	"Young Greed" (feat. Wheesung; 어린욕심)	3:43
11.	"Alice" (앨리스)	3:29
12.	"Child - I Cry" (Instrumental)	4:11
13.	"Password 486" (Instrumental)	3:47

The Perfect Day to Say I Love You (Special Edition) track listing
No.	Title	Length
1.	"Love Condition" (Remix; 연애조건)
2.	"Password 486"
3.	"My★Lover" (Korean Version)
4.	"Fly"
5.	"Hello Beautiful Day"
6.	"Child - I Cry"
7.	"Delete"
8.	"Young Greed" (feat. Wheesung)
9.	"Innermost Feelings"
10.	"Alice"
11.	"A Perfect Day to Say I Love You"
12.	"Just Today"
13.	"Password 486" (Instrumental)
14.	"Love Condition" (Remix) (Instrumental)
