= Younha =

South Korean pop singer-songwriter

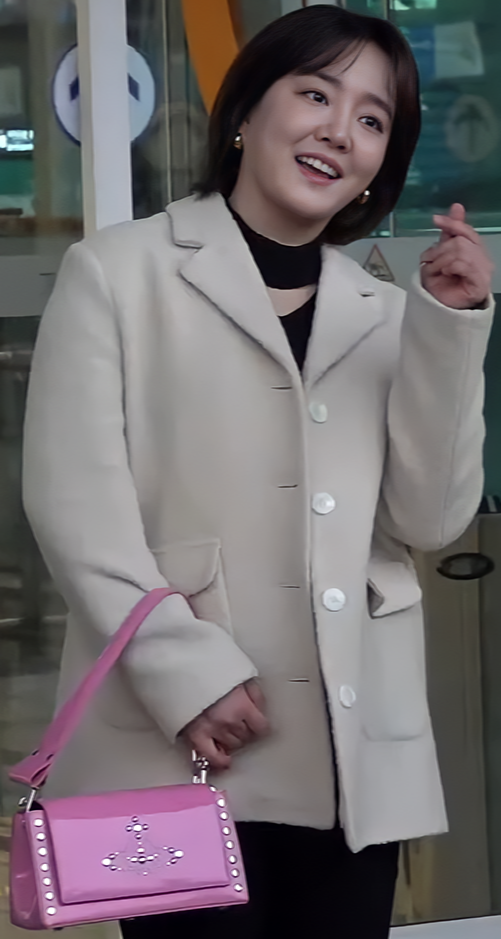
- Younha in 2023

Background information
- Born: Ko Younha; April 29, 1988 (age 38); Cheongju, South Korea
- Genres: Rock; pop
- Occupations: Singer-songwriter; record producer
- Instruments: Vocals; piano; guitar
- Years active: 2004–present
- Labels: MEPLUS; C9
- Spouse: Lee Hyo-jong (m. 2025)

Korean name
- Hangul: 고윤하
- RR: Go Yunha
- MR: Ko Yunha

Ko Younha (Korean: 고윤하; Hanja: 高潤荷; born April 29, 1988), known mononymously as Younha, is a South Korean singer-songwriter and record producer. She began her career in 2004 in Japan, where she was nicknamed the "Oricon Comet" for her success on the Japanese music chart. In 2006, she debuted in South Korea, where she is regarded as one of the country's best singer-songwriters.

== Early life and education ==
Younha was born in South Korea on April 29, 1988, where she began to play the piano at the age of 5. She started singing in elementary school and later began to teach herself Japanese after watching the popular Japanese drama, Gokusen. As a teenager, Younha said she went to as many as 20 auditions with South Korean record labels but was rejected because she wasn't "pretty enough to become a star". As a result, she dropped out of high school at the age of 16 to pursue a singing career in Japan. Younha later attended Hankuk University of Foreign Studies, where she majored in Japanese.

== Career ==
=== 2004–2005: Debut in Japan ===
After arriving in Japan in January 2004, Younha released her debut single, "Yubikiri", that September, followed by the Japanese version of the song in October. Despite the fact the song was included on the soundtrack of the Fuji TV drama, Destiny of Love, it was not a success.

"Houkiboshi" to Go! Younha

Younha found mainstream success with her second Japanese single, "Houkiboshi", which was included on the soundtrack of the anime series Bleach. The song debuted on the Oricon daily chart at No. 18 and peaked at No. 12, making Younha the second South Korean artist, after BoA, to break into the Oricon top 20. Less than 2 months after the success of Houkiboshi, she released "Motto Futari de", to little fanfare, with minimal promotion, and Younha made no TV appearances to promote the single live. Her third single, "Touch / Yume no Tsuzuki", with a tie-in to the Touch live action movie adaptation, with Touch as the theme song, was significantly more successful, and brought her back into the Oricon Top 20, matching the success of "Houkiboshi". The single debuted at No. 15, and peaked at No. 11 on the Daily chart. After releasing four singles, Younha released her first album entitled Go! Younha with moderate success. It reached the No. 10 spot on the Oricon daily charts, and No. 12 on the weekly charts.

=== 2006–2007: Later struggles and Korean debut ===
However, Younha's next three singles, "My Lover", "Te wo Tsunaide" and "Ima ga Daisuki", despite various tie-ins such as Bleach GC: Tasogare Ni Mamieru Shinigami, Jyu Oh Sei (獣王星) and Jang Geum's Dream, failed to replicate the success from her earlier efforts, all ranking in the lower half of the Oricon Top 100.

In the meantime, Younha enrolled in Hankuk University of Foreign Studies and began her debut in Korea, releasing a digital Korean single album titled "Audition". Many performances of this song were shown on Korean TV, and the single received much promotion, as a result, "Audition" charted well for over 3 months on all Korean charts.

Despite the lackluster performance of her last 3 Japanese singles, Younha was chosen to sing an opening theme song for Kiba. The song "Hakanaku Tsuyoku" (儚く強く) was used as the second opening theme for the show. The single was released on January 17, 2007, and due to the nature of its tie-in, charted much higher than her last 3 releases, peaking at No. 36 - but also marked her last single with Epic Records.

=== 2007–2009: Crossover to Korea and return to Japan ===
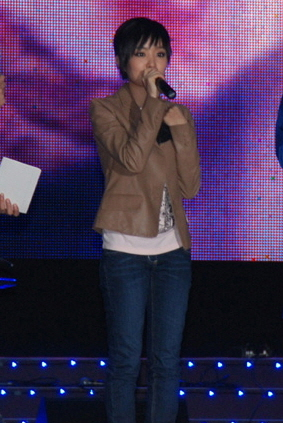
Younha during a concert in 2008

Exactly two months after "Hakanaku Tsuyoku", Younha returned to Korea to release her first Korean album entitled The Perfect Day to Say I Love You (고백하기 좋은 날, Gobaekhagi Jo-eun Nal). The album was a success, peaking at No. 1 on the charts. The first song promoted from the album was "Password 486", for which she won the SBS Inkigayo Mutizen award twice. A music video was made for "Password 486", which stars fellow Stam artist Yoon Ji-hoo. The album also features a collaboration with Wheesung. On July 14, 2007, Younha appeared on the Korean GomTV MSL Grand Finals (a StarCraft tournament) and performed in the opening ceremony. The second song promoted was "Love Condition", accompanied with a repackage of her debut album. While no music video was made, the song was performed live a number of times, and had modest success on the charts.

At the 2007 MKMF held on November 17, 2007, Younha won the Best New Solo Artist award. With her increasing success, Younha released a version of Go! Younha rerecorded in Korean. The album, with minor track list changes, is titled Comet (혜성, Hyeseong) and was released on October 23, spawning two hit singles, the title track "혜성 (Hyeseong)" and "At First Sight". Riding the success experienced in, Korea, her very first Korean single "Audition" was re-released on March 14 as a physical CD, limited to 10,000 copies.

Epic Records quietly released a "best of" Japanese album/music video DVD of Younha's work to date, SONGS -Teen's Collection-, on March 26, 2008, signaling the end of her contract with the record label, due to the recent poor performance of her singles, and her focus on the Korean music industry.

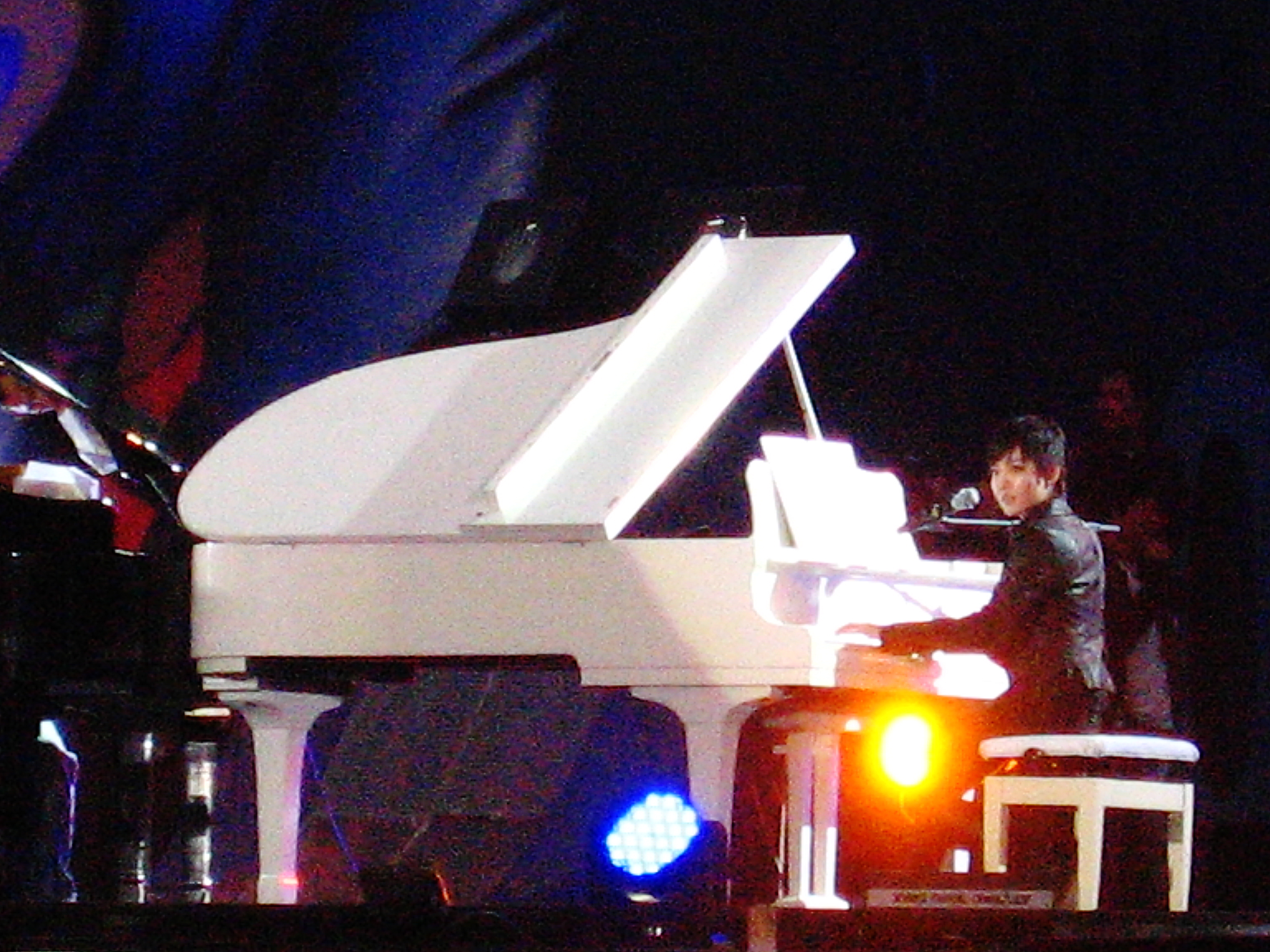
Younha performing on piano in 2008

On August 28, 2008, Younha followed up her last few successful albums with her sophomore effort, titled Someday. The album went on to spawn two hit singles, "Telepathy", and "Gossip Boy". The album also featured her second collaboration with Tablo, who co-wrote and featured in the song, "Memory".

In early 2009, Younha made her comeback to the Japanese music industry, now signed with Sistus Records, with a Japanese version of "Memory", titled "Kioku", tying in as the ending theme to the Rideback anime. No physical release of the song was issued and was an online only single until the release of her next studio album, Hitotsu Sora no Shita, which included it on the track listing. Her return to the industry also included a role in a Japanese movie, On Next Sunday (今度の日曜日に, Kondo no Nichiyoubi ni), released in April 2009, also singing the theme song On the Other Side of the Rainbow (虹の向こう側, Niji no Mukougawa). She went on to release 2 physical singles, "Girl" and "Sukinanda", however both failed to chart in the top 100.

Her highly anticipated third album Part A: Peace Love & Ice Cream was released on April 16, 2009, with a new record label, Lion Media. The promotional track 1, 2, 3 was a signalled change in her style, in fashion sense, taking on a cuter, girly appearance, as opposed to her more tomboy look for her previous promotional periods. The style change also encompassed her music, with her songs from the album losing her trademark debut Piano rock sound which brought her critical acclaim and success, turning to pop. Despite the sudden change in musical style, the song was a strong contender for No. 1, but was beaten out due to strong competition during the promotional run.

=== 2009–2012: Decline and legal troubles ===
On December 11, 2009, Younha released the second part of her third Korean album, Part B: Growing Season, showing a mature, darker contrast to the happier, pop-based Part A. The album spawned one No. 1 single, "We Broke Up Today".

Her second Japanese album Under the Same Sky (ひとつ空の下) was released on September 22, 2010, in Japan and September 29, 2010, in Korea. The album features Younha's work with i-dep and Sotte Bosse's Nakamura Hiroshi, as well as popular acoustic guitar duo Depapepe. The album debuted to little fanfare, only achieving No. 169 on the Oricon Album charts.

After a year of relatively quiet activity since her last major release, Lost in Love, Younha's first EP, was released, including a collection of various soundtrack singles released throughout the year, as well as the promotional singles One Shot, stylistically a rare return to her piano rock roots, and Take Care of My Boyfriend, a pop-rock ballad. While the latter barely made the, Top 10, One Shot missed the Top 20. While "One Shot" was a welcome return to the original sound she was known for, there were also very strong similarities to the Sara Bareilles song, "Love Song" noted by netizens. With minimal promotion, the EP became the lowest selling album in Younha's Korean discography.

On May 9, 2011, Younha became the 22nd host of MBC FM radio program, "Starry Night". On July 12, 2011, it was revealed that Younha was suing her company, Lion Media, to request a termination of contract due to questionable validity, through the legal courts, though further revelations showed that these proceedings had started since April. A countersuit from her company was filed against her in return, for US$1 million to recover damages. A mediation session was scheduled for October to settle the matter but fell through. It was not until February 2012, that the courts found the case in favor of Younha, resulting in the annulment of her contract with Lion Media, as well as 100 million KRW compensation.

=== 2012–present: Comeback and Growth Theory ===
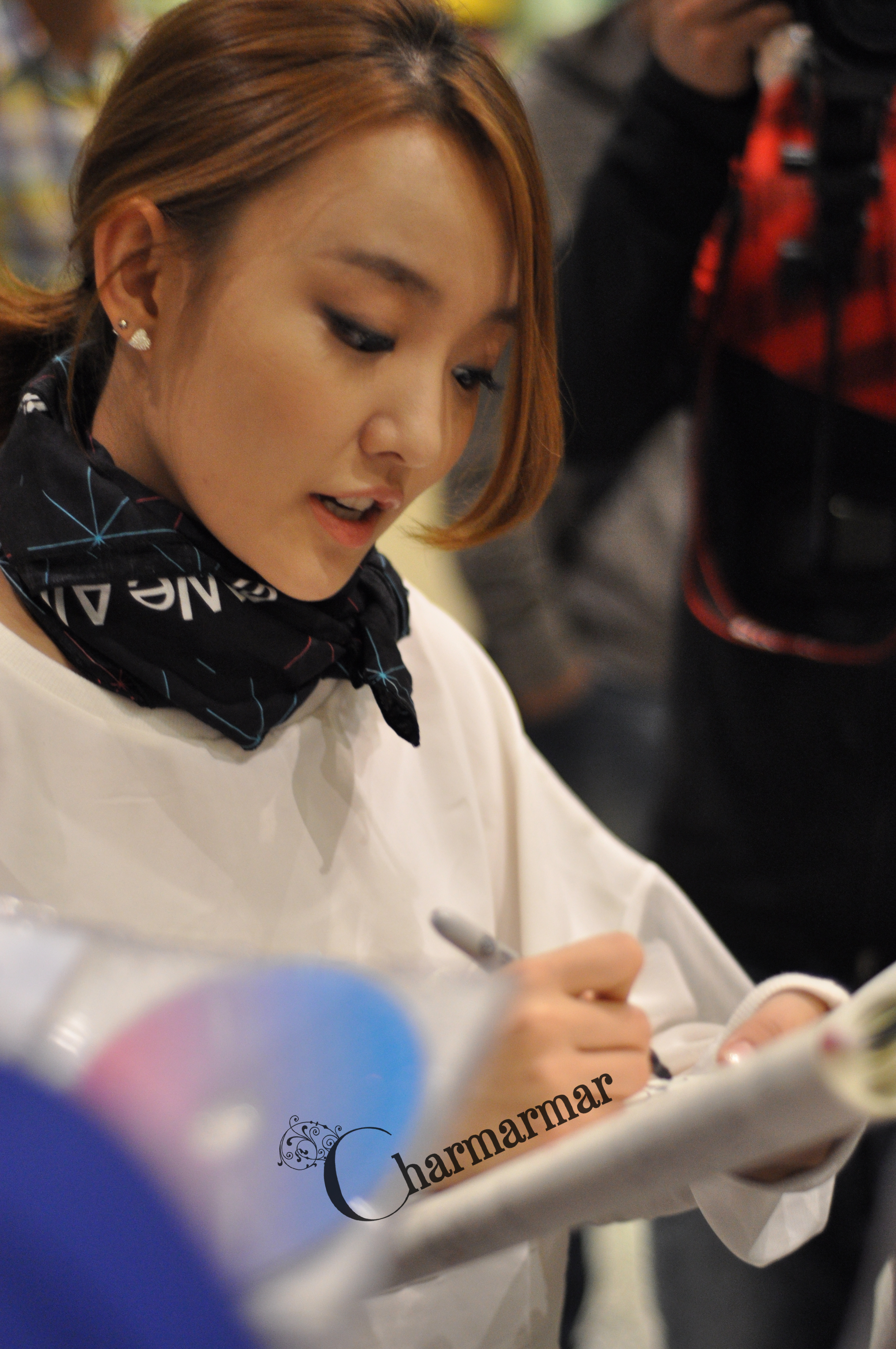
Younha in 2012

After her legal troubles, Younha began her comeback activities with a new record label, wealive (now C9 Entertainment). She released her fourth album Supersonic on July 3, 2012, featuring artists such as Jay Park, Tiger JK, and John Park. The album spawned two singles, the Top 10 Hit, "Would We Have Changed?" featuring John Park, and "Run". The album was released to critical acclaim, embracing a rock-based style, doing away with ballad styles she had promoted for the last 2 years, and even led to "Run" being nominated for Pop Song of the Year at the Korean Music Awards. She also joined the cast of I Am a Singer, a show based around professional singers remaking songs, ranging from old to current hits.

On May 2, 2013, Younha released her second EP, Just Listen receiving rave reviews. The album also brought her back to commercial success, "아니야 (Unacceptable)" became her first Top 5 single since "오늘 헤어졌어요 (Broke Up Today)" in 2009 and is also her first album to feature 2 Top 10 singles, Unacceptable and Reason. On December 6, 2013, Younha released her third EP, Subsonic, featuring the lead-in single "It's Okay" and follow up "Not There" featuring Eluphant. With the release of these singles, it brings about the first time in Younha's career where she has achieved 3 Top 10 singles, and at a stretch, 4 Top 15 singles in one year.

On May 29, 2014, she collaborated with rock singer Jung Joon-young to release the digital single "Just The Way You Are" (달리 함께). The song peaked at No. 11 on the Billboard K-pop Hot 100. She achieved her first No. 1 single in her career on the Gaon Charts, 10 years after debut, with her solo remake of her 2008 hit with Epik High, "Umbrella". The original version in turn, also surged up the charts, jumping 245 places up to No. 53 in that same week. This marks the first time she has topped the chart since "Broke Up Today" 5 years before, in 2009, and "Comet" in 2007.

On November 11, 2015, Younha released her single "Thinking About You" (널 생각해), produced by Lee Chanhyuk of Akdong Musician. She released her fifth album, RescuE, on December 27, 2017. Billboard ranked the album number eight on its list of top K-Pop albums of the 2010s, calling it "a cathartic listening experience that reflected on hard times and hinted to the brightness beyond them". Younha followed up by releasing the EP Stable Mindset in 2019, and then the EP Unstable Mindset on January 6, 2020. The latter contained the song "Winter Flower", a collaboration with RM from BTS, which Billboard called "an epic, comforting power ballad". Furthermore, the song gave Younha the title of the first Korean female solo artist to Top US iTunes chart. Younha released her sixth album, End Theory on November 16, 2021, and a repackaged version with 3 additional songs, End Theory: Final Edition, was released on March 30, 2022. On June 30, 2022, Younha released the digital single "Rain Song", which is a remake of Epik High's single of the same name.

"Event Horizon", the lead single from End Theory: Final Edition began to rise in the charts and viral popularity 6 months after initial release, as Younha did major gigs at universities and festivals in the second half of 2022, with positive word of mouth and fan footage gathering views online. The song peaked at No. 1 on the Circle Digital Chart.

Younha released her seventh album Growth Theory on September 1, 2024, led by the title track "Sunfish". The repackaged version Growth Theory: Final Edition was released after two months on November 14. In early 2025, Younha celebrated the 21st anniversary of her debut with a successful concert series, further solidifying her career longevity.

== Personal life ==
On March 5, 2025, Younha announced that she would be getting married. Younha married on March 30, 2025. It was reported that her husband is Lee Hyo-jong, who runs the YouTube channel "Science Cookie".

== Discography ==
=== Korean albums ===
- The Perfect Day to Say I Love You (2007)
- Comet (2007)
- Someday (2008)
- Peace, Love & Ice Cream (2009)
- Growing Season (2009)
- Supersonic (2012)
- RescuE (2017)
- End Theory (2021)
- End Theory: Final Edition (2022)
- Mindset (2023)
- Growth Theory (2024)
- Growth Theory: Final Edition (2024)

=== Japanese albums ===
- Go! Younha (2005)
- Under the Same Sky (2010)

== Filmography ==
=== Films ===
Year	Film	Role	Notes	Ref.
2011	The Suicide Forecast	Ahn So-yeon	124 minutes	

=== Television shows ===
Year	Title	Role	Ref.
2017	KBS Drama Special – "Viva Ensemble"	Singer-songwriter	
2022	Youth Star	Youth mentor	
2023	Universe Ticket	Mentor	

== Awards and nominations ==
Name of the award ceremony, year presented, category, nominee of the award, and the result of the nomination
Award ceremony	Year	Category	Nominee / Work	Result	Ref.
Brand Customer Loyalty Awards	2022	Best Female Vocalist	Younha	Won	
Circle Chart Music Awards	2023	Discovery of the Year – Rock & Metal	Younha	Won	
Cyworld Digital Music Awards	2007	Rookie of the Month – April	"Password 486"	Won	
Golden Disc Awards	2007	Best New Artist	"Password 486"	Won	
Golden Disc Awards	2023	Female Solo Artist	Younha	Won	
Hanteo Music Awards	2023	Special Award – Ballad	Younha	Won	
K-Global Heart Dream Awards	2023	K-Pop Listener's Choice Award	Younha	Won	
Korean Music Awards	2008	Best New Artist	Younha	Won	
Korean Music Awards	2008	Pop Musician of the Year – Netizen Vote	Younha	Won	
Korean Music Awards	2008	Best Pop Song	"Password 486"	Nominated	
Korean Music Awards	2009	Pop Musician of the Year – Netizen Vote	Someday	Won	
Korean Music Awards	2009	Best Pop Album	Someday	Nominated	
Korean Music Awards	2013	Best Pop Song	"Run"	Nominated	
Korean Music Awards	2023	Best Pop Song	"Event Horizon"	Won	
Korean Music Awards	2023	Song of the Year	"Event Horizon"	Won	
Korean Music Awards	2023	Musician of the Year	Younha	Nominated	
MBC Entertainment Awards	2011	Excellence Award – Radio	"Younha's Starry Night"	Won	
Melon Music Awards	2023	Best OST	"Letter" (편지)	Nominated	
Mnet Asian Music Awards	2007	Best New Artist	"Password 486"	Won	
Mnet Asian Music Awards	2008	Best Female Artist	"Telepathy"	Nominated	
Mnet Asian Music Awards	2009	Best Female Artist	"123"	Nominated	
Mnet Asian Music Awards	2014	Best Vocal Performance – Female	"Umbrella"	Nominated	
Seoul Music Awards	2023	Ballad Award	Younha	Won	
