= Epik High discography =

Retrospective of releases by Korean group Epik High

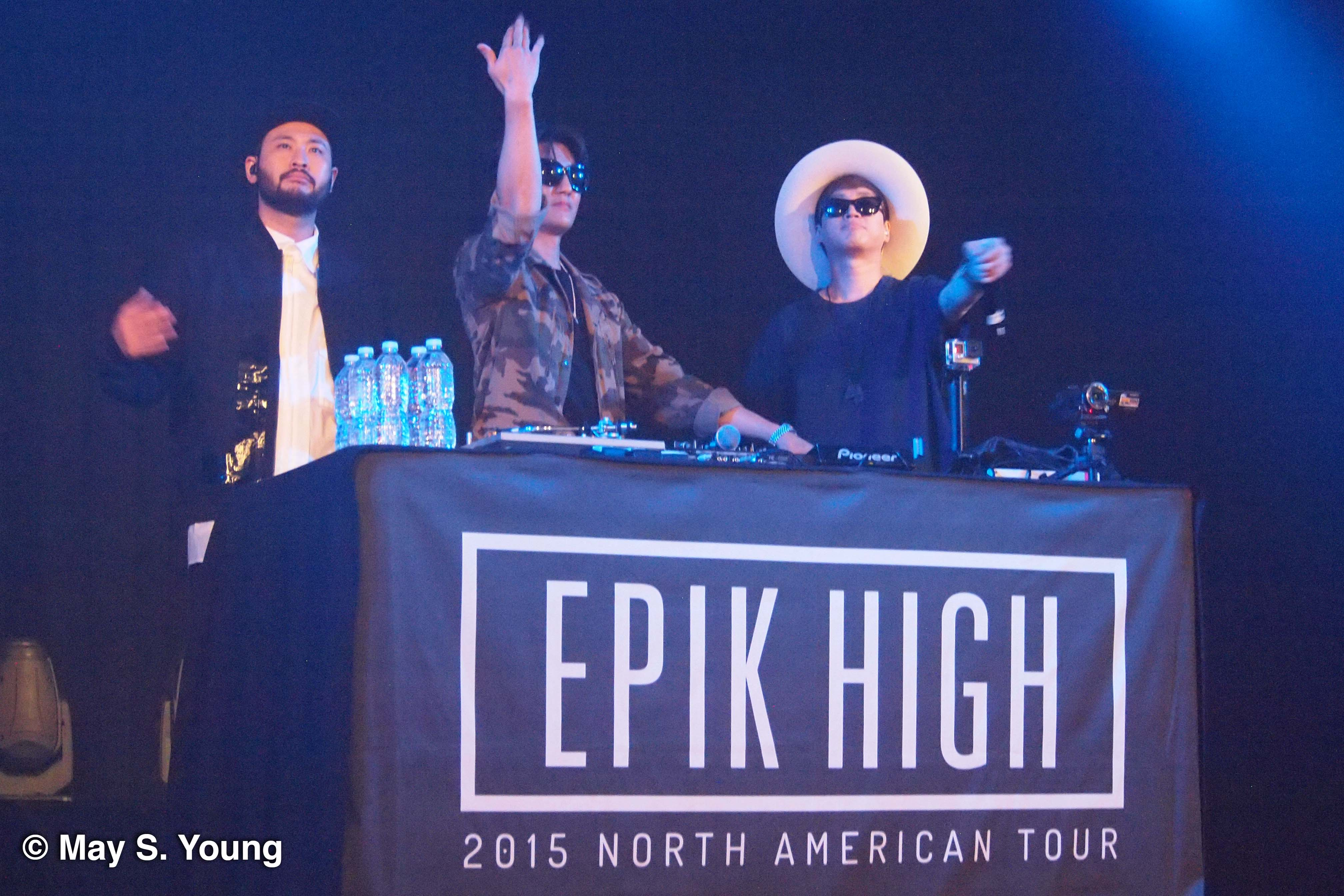
- Epik High performing in June 2015
- Studio albums: 10
- Extended plays: 4
- Compilation albums: 1
- Singles: 18
- Music videos: 12
- Remix albums: 2
- Special albums: 2

This is the discography of South Korean hip hop group Epik High.

== Albums ==
=== Studio albums ===
Title	Album details	Peak chart positions			Sales
Title	Album details	KOR RIAK (Note: RIAK/MIAK issued monthly album charts from 1998 until September 2008.)	KOR Circle (Note: The Circle Album Chart was first published in 2010 as the Gaon Album Chart)	US World	Sales
Map of the Human Soul	Released: October 21, 2003; Label: Woollim Entertainment; Formats: CD	—	—	—	KOR: 21,000
High Society	Released: July 25, 2004; Label: Woollim Entertainment; Formats: CD	26	—	—	KOR: 32,828
Swan Songs	Released: October 4, 2005; Label: Woollim Entertainment; Formats: CD, digital download	—	—	—	KOR: 150,000
Remapping the Human Soul	Released: January 23, 2007; Label: Woollim Entertainment; Formats: CD, digital download	1	—	—	KOR: 130,000
Pieces, Part One	Released: April 17, 2008; Label: Woollim Entertainment; Formats: CD, digital download	2	—	—	KOR: 90,000
[e]	Released: September 16, 2009; Label: Map the Soul Inc.; Formats: CD, digital download	—N/a	57	—	KOR: 35,683
99	Released: October 19, 2012; Label: YG Entertainment; Formats: CD, digital download	—N/a	2	13	KOR: 27,887
Shoebox	Released: October 21, 2014; Label: YG Entertainment; Formats: CD, digital download	—N/a	3	1	KOR: 30,718; US: 2,000
We've Done Something Wonderful	Released: October 23, 2017; Label: YG Entertainment; Formats: LP, CD, digital download	—N/a	6	2	KOR: 19,238; US: 1,000; JPN: 711
Epik High Is Here 上 (Part 1)	Released: January 18, 2021; Label: Ours Co, Kakao M; Formats: CD, digital download	—N/a	7	—	KOR: 13,135
Epik High Is Here 下 (Part 2)	Released: February 14, 2022; Label: Ours Co, Kakao Entertainment; Formats: CD, digital download	—N/a	17	—	KOR: 8,883
"—" denotes releases that did not chart.

=== Mixtapes ===
Title	Album details	Peak chart positions	Sales
Title	Album details	KOR	Sales
Pump	Released: June 20, 2024; Label: Ours Co., Kakao Entertainment; Formats: CD, digital download	29	KOR: 4,129
Pump Collector's Edition	Released: October 18, 2024; Label: Ours Co., Kakao Entertainment; Formats: LP, digital download	27	KOR: 2,549

=== Compilation albums ===
Title	Album details	Peak chart positions	Sales
Title	Album details	JPN	Sales
The Best of Epik High ~ Show Must Go On & On	Released: April 29, 2015; Label: YGEX; Formats: CD, digital download	43	

=== Special albums ===
Title	Album details	Peak chart positions		Sales
Title	Album details	KOR	US World	Sales
Map the Soul	Released: March 27, 2009; Label: Map the Soul Inc.; Formats: CD + book, digital download	—	—	
Epilogue	Released: March 9, 2010; Label: Map the Soul Inc.; Formats: CD, digital download	1	13	KOR: 25,988
"—" denotes releases that did not chart.

=== Remix albums ===
Title	Album details
Remixing the Human Soul	Released: July 22, 2009; Label: Map the Soul Inc.; Formats: CD, digital download
Black Swan Songs	Released: February 13, 2006; Label: Woollim Entertainment; Formats: CD, digital download

== Extended plays ==
Title	Details	Peak chart positions		Sales
Title	Details	KOR	US World	Sales
Lovescream	Released: September 30, 2008; Label: Woollim Entertainment; Formats: CD, digital download	—	—	KOR: 50,058
Sleepless in	Released: March 11, 2019; Label: Ours Co., Kakao M; Formats: LP, CD, digital download	8	6	KOR: 15,706
Strawberry	Released: February 1, 2023; Label: Ours Co., Kakao Entertainment; Formats: CD, digital download	33	—	KOR: 5,321
Screen Time	Released: November 1, 2023; Label: Ours Co., Kakao Entertainment; Formats: CD, digital download	31	—	KOR: 3,744
Epikase Song Battle	Released: September 4, 2026; Label: Ours Co.; Format: Digital download	—	—	
"—" denotes releases that did not chart.

== Singles ==
Title	Year	Peak positions			Sales	Album
Title	Year	KOR	KOR Hot (Note: The Kpop Hot 100 was discontinued on July 16, 2014. The chart was later re-established following the term date of May 29 – June 4, 2017.)	US World	Sales	Album
"I Remember" (feat. Kensie)	2003	—	—	—		Map of the Human Soul
"Day of Peace" (평화의 날)	2004	—	—	—		High Society
"Even Alone" (혼자라도) (feat. Alex and Horan of Clazziquai)	2004	—	—	—		High Society
"Fly" (feat. Amin. J of Soulciety)	2005	—	—	—		Swan Songs
"Paris" (feat. Jisun of Loveholic)	2005	—	—	—		Swan Songs
"Fan"	2007	—	—	—		Remapping the Human Soul
"Love Love Love" (feat. Lee Yoong-jin of Casker)	2007	11	—	—		Remapping the Human Soul
"One" (feat. Jisun of Loveholic)	2008	—	—	—		Pieces, Part One
"Umbrella" (우산) (feat. Younha)	2008	149	95	—		Pieces, Part One
"1 Minute 1 Second" (1분 1초) (feat. Taru)	2008	—	—	—		Lovescream
"Wannabe" (따라해) (feat. Mellow)	2009	—	—	—		[e]
"It is Cold" (춥다) (feat. Lee Hi)	2012	1	1	5	KOR: 1,868,347	99
"Up" (feat. Park Bom of 2NE1)	2012	6	8	—	KOR: 1,002,106	99
"Don't Hate Me"	2012	11	16	—	KOR: 784,301	99
"Born Hater" (feat. Beenzino, Verbal Jint, B.I, Mino and Bobby)	2014	3	—	5	KOR: 1,498,062	Shoebox
"Spoiler" (스포일러)	2014	4	—	16	KOR: 581,469	Shoebox
"Happen Ending" (feat. Cho Won-sun of Rollercoaster)	2014	1	—	14	KOR: 1,269,638	Shoebox
"Love Story" (연애소설) (feat. IU)	2017	1	1	—	KOR: 2,500,000	We've Done Something Wonderful
"Home Is Far Away" (빈차) (feat. Oh Hyuk)	2017	2	3	—	KOR: 614,007	We've Done Something Wonderful
"Lovedrunk" (술이 달다) (feat. Crush)	2019	1	1	—		Sleepless in __________
"Rosario" (feat. CL and Zico)	2021	11	15	11		Epik High Is Here 上 (Part 1)
"Based on a True Story" (내 얘기 같아) (feat. Heize)	2021	12	—	—		Epik High Is Here 上 (Part 1)
"Rain Song" (비 오는 날 듣기 좋은 노래) (feat. Colde)	2021	23	—	—		Epik High Is Here 下 (Part 2)
"Face ID" (feat. Sik-K, Justhis and Giriboy)	2021	112	67	—		Epik High Is Here 下 (Part 2)
"Gray So Gray" (그래서 그래) (feat. Younha)	2022	24	32	—		Epik High Is Here 下 (Part 2)
"Catch" (feat. Hwasa)	2023	124	—	—		Strawberry
"Screen Time" (feat. Hoshi)	2023	129	—	—		Screen Time
"Mise en scène" (미장센) (with Davichi)	2026	44	—	—		Non-album single
"—"denotes releases that did not chart.

== Other charted songs ==
Title	Year	Peak chart positions	Sales	Album
Title	Year	KOR	Sales	Album
"Fool" (feat. Bumkey)	2010	89		Epilogue
"Coffee"	2010	54		Epilogue
"You Don't Deserve Her" (아까워)	2012	32	KOR: 295,869	99
"Wrong" (사랑한다면 해선 안될 말)	2012	19	KOR: 416,502	99
"The Bad Guy" (악당)	2012	56	KOR: 184,738	99
"Kill This Love"	2012	50	KOR: 193,770	99
"New Beautiful"	2012	58	KOR: 177,847	99
"Encore" (막을 올리며)	2014	16	KOR: 214,868	Shoebox
"Rich" (feat. Taeyang)	2014	7	KOR: 349,008	Shoebox
"Burj Khalifa" (부르즈 할리파)	2014	8	KOR: 312,423	Shoebox
"We Fight Ourselves" (또 싸워)	2014	6	KOR: 399,341	Shoebox
"Amor Fati"	2014	9	KOR: 267,081	Shoebox
"Lesson 5 (Timeline)" (타임라인)	2014	18	KOR: 203,904	Shoebox
"Life is Good"	2014	13	KOR : 234,796	Shoebox
"Eyes, Nose, Lips" (feat. Taeyang)	2014	11	KOR: 263,129	Shoebox
"Shoebox" (신발장)	2014	14	KOR: 243,410	Shoebox
"No Thanxxx" (노땡큐) (feat. Mino, Simon Dominic and the Quiett)	2017	4	KOR: 385,156	We've Done Something Wonderful
"The Benefits of the Heartbreak" (상실의 순기능) (feat. Lee Suhyun)	2017	8	KOR: 181,708	We've Done Something Wonderful
"Here Come the Regrets" (feat. Lee Hi)	2017	12	KOR: 123,630	We've Done Something Wonderful
"Munbae-Dong" (문배동 단골집) (feat. Crush)	2017	14	KOR: 127,488	We've Done Something Wonderful
"Lost One" (개화) (feat. Kim Jong-wan)	2017	17	KOR: 113,935	We've Done Something Wonderful
"People Scare Me" (난 사람이 제일 무서워)	2017	21	KOR: 85,539	We've Done Something Wonderful
"Us Against the World" (어른 즈음에)	2017	23	KOR: 82,512	We've Done Something Wonderful
"Bleed"	2017	27	KOR: 76,322	We've Done Something Wonderful
"Tape 2002 7 28" (TAPE 28 July 2002)	2017	33	KOR: 58,600	We've Done Something Wonderful
"Eternal Sunshine" (새벽에)	2019	14		Sleepless in __________
"In Seoul" (feat. Sunwoo Jung-a)	2019	29		Sleepless in __________
"Rain Again Tomorrow" (비가 온대 내일도)	2019	50		Sleepless in __________
"No Different" (feat. Yuna)	2019	54		Sleepless in __________
"Lullaby for a Cat"	2019	73		Sleepless in __________
"Sleepless"	2019	90		Sleepless in __________
"Super Rare" (feat. Wonstein and pH-1)	2022	176		Epik High Is Here 下 (Part 2)

== Soundtrack appearances ==
Title	Year	Peak chart positions		Sales	Album
Title	Year	KOR	US World	Sales	Album
"Sky High (With Epik High)"	2004	—	—	—	Nonstop 04 OST
"Can You Hear My Heart" (Epik High feat. Lee Hi)	2016	12	14	KOR: 254,899	Moon Lovers: Scarlet Heart Ryeo OST

== Collaborations and featured appearances ==
Year	Artist	Album	Song	Notes
2003	CB Mass	Massappeal	동네 한 바퀴	
2003	Joosuc	Superior Vol.1 This iz my life	"BALLIN' 2k3" (VIP remix)	
2004	Keeproots	Keepin' The Roots	이보다 더 (Feat. Epik High & Yankie from TBNY)	Tablo and Mithra Jin credited as co-composers
2004	MC Mong	180 Degree	"몽송(夢送)" (Feat. Epik High)	
2006	TBNY	Masquerade	"L.I.E" (Feat. Epik High)	Tablo and Mithra Jin credited as co-composers
2006	I.F	More Than Music	"N.I.C.E (Nothing Is Cool Enough)" (Feat. Epik High, Jinbo)	Tablo and Mithra Jin credited as co-lyricists, DJ Tukutz credited as composer and arranger
2007	Verbal Jint	Favorite	내리막 (Feat. Tablo and Mithra Jin of Epik High)	
2007	Wanted & Lee Jung	7Dayz & Wanted	"너와 나" (Feat. Epik High)	
2007	Brown Eyed Soul	The Wind, The Sea, The Rain	"Sweet Thing" (Feat. Dynamic Duo, Epik High)	Tablo and Mithra Jin credited as co-lyricists
2009	Leessang	Baekajeolhyeon	난 말이야... (Feat. Tablo and Mithra Jin of Epik High and Hyuna)	Tablo and Mithra Jin credited as co-lyricists

== Music videos ==
Year	Title
2003	"I Remember"
2004	"혼자라도"
2004	"Day of Peace"
2005	"Fly"
2005	Paris"
2007	"Fan"
2007	"Love Love Love"
2008	"One"
2008	"Umbrella"
2008	"Breakdown"
2009	"Map The Soul"
2009	"One Minute One Second"
2009	"Wannabe"
2009	"트로트" + "High Technology"
2009	"Slow Motion" (for No Mercy (2010) OST)
2010	"Run"
2012	"Don't Hate Me"
2012	"Up"
2014	"Born Hater"
2014	"Spoiler" + "Happen Ending"
2017	"Home Is Far Away" + "Love Story"
2017	"Love Story" concept
2017	"Lost One"
2019	"Lovedrunk"
2021	"Rosario"
2021	"Based On A True Story"
2021	"Rain Song"
2021	"FACE ID"
2023	"Catch" + "On My Way"
2023	"Screen Time"
2024	"ANTIHERO"
2024	"Michelin Cypher"
