= Show Must Go On & On =

Studio album by Epik High
- Released: June 8, 2016
- Recorded: 2003–2016
- Genre: Hip hop; alternative hip hop
- Length: 72:26
- Label: YGEX; Avex Trax

Epik High chronology
Shoebox (2014)	Show Must Go On & On (2016)	We've Done Something Wonderful (2017)

Singles from Show Must Go On & On
- 1. "Don't Hate Me" Released: April 26, 2016

The Best of Epik High - Show Must Go On & On (stylized as THE BEST OF EPIK HIGH ~SHOW MUST GO ON & ON~) is the second Japanese studio album by South Korean hip hop group Epik High. The album was released on June 8, 2016, and is a compilation of Epik High's title tracks starting from their debut album to their 2014 album, Shoebox (which had its Japanese release December 24, 2014), and contains Japanese versions of two of their past Korean title tracks, Love Love Love and Don't Hate Me. It was released by CD, DVD, and Smapra Music.

== Release ==
Following the Japanese release of their previous album, Shoebox, the band released a compilation album of their Korean title tracks titled THE BEST OF EPIK HIGH ~SHOW MUST GO ON~ in Japan on April 29, 2015. The compilation album was released to promote their Japanese tour of the same name. The tour started on May 3, 2015 in Kanagawa and ended on May 24, 2015 in Tokyo. The group then decided to repackage the album with Japanese versions of their songs, Love Love Love (which features Sandara Park of 2NE1) and Don't Hate Me. To further promote the album, the music video of the Japanese version of Don't Hate Me was released on April 26, 2016; two months before the album.

== Track listing ==
No.	Title	Lyrics	Music	Original Album	Length
1.	"I Remember (feat. Kenzie)"	Tablo, Mithra Jin, Gaeko, J-Win	Gaeko	Map of the Human Soul	3:42
2.	"Peace Day"	Tablo, Mithra Jin	Tablo	High Society	3:41
3.	"Fly (feat. Amin J of Soulciety)"	Tablo, Mithra Jin	Tablo	Swan Songs	3:23
4.	"Paris (feat. Jisun of Loveholics)"	Tablo, Mithra Jin	Lee Hyun Jin (of Deux)	Swan Songs	3:41
5.	"Fan"	Tablo, Mithra Jin	Tablo	Remapping the Human Soul	3:47
6.	"Love Love Love (feat. Dara of 2NE1)" (Japanese Version)	Tablo, Mithra Jin	Tablo	Remapping the Human Soul	3:53
7.	"One (feat. Jisun of Loveholics)"	Tablo, Mithra Jin	Tablo	Pieces, Part One	3:52
8.	"Umbrella (feat. Younha)"	Tablo, Mithra Jin	Tablo	Pieces, Part One	5:02
9.	"1 Minute 1 Second (feat. Taru)"	Tablo, Mithra Jin	Tablo	Lovescream	4:29
10.	"Map the Soul (feat. MYK)"	Tablo, Mithra Jin	DJ Tukutz	Map the Soul	3:54
11.	"Trot"	Tablo, Mithra Jin	DJ Tukutz	(e)	4:48
12.	"High Technology"	Tablo, Mithra Jin	DJ Tukutz, Planet Shiver	(e)	3:32
13.	"It's Cold (feat. Lee Hi))"	Tablo, Mithra Jin	Tablo, PK	99	4:13
14.	"Up (feat. Park Bom of 2NE1)"	Tablo, Mithra Jin	Tablo, DEE.P	99	3:43
15.	"Don't Hate Me" (Japanese Version)	Tablo, Mithra Jin, Gashima of White Jam	Tablo, Choice37	99	3:46
16.	"Born Hater (feat. B.I & Bobby of iKON, and Mino of Winner)" (Clean Version)	Tablo, Mithra Jin, B.I, Bobby, Mino	DJ Tukutz, B.I	Shoebox	3:57
17.	"Happen Ending (feat. Cho Won Son of Rollercoaster)" (Clean Version)	Tablo	Tablo, Choice37	Shoebox	4:25
18.	"Spoiler"	Tablo	Tablo, PK	Shoebox	4:38
Total length:					72:26
