= Shoebox (album) =

Studio album by Epik High
- Released: October 21, 2014; December 24, 2014 (Japanese Edition)
- Recorded: 2014
- Genres: Hip hop; alternative hip hop
- Length: 51:35; 57:51 (Japanese Edition)
- Label: YG Entertainment

Epik High chronology
| 99 (2012) | Shoebox (2014) | Show Must Go On & On (2016) |

Singles from Shoebox
- 1. "Born Hater" Released: October 18, 2014; 2. "Spoiler" Released: October 21, 2014; 3. "Happen Ending" Released: October 21, 2014

Shoebox (Korean: 신발장; RR: Sinbaljang) is the eighth studio album by the South Korean hip hop group Epik High. It was released digitally on October 21, 2014, and physically on October 22, through YG Entertainment. "Spoiler" and "Happen Ending" served as the title tracks for the album.

== Background ==
YG Entertainment announced on October 13, 2014, that the group would make a comeback with their eighth studio album on October 21. It was also revealed that the album release was delayed one week due to the music video shoot taking longer than expected. The Japanese edition of this album was released by YGEX, the joint label between YG Entertainment and Japanese record label Avex Trax, on December 24, 2014.

== Track listing ==
Shoebox track listing
| No. | Title | Lyrics | Music | Arrangement | Length |
|---|---|---|---|---|---|
| 1. | "Encore" (막을 올리며) | Tablo; Mithra Jin | DJ Tukutz | DJ Tukutz | 4:34 |
| 2. | "Happen Ending" (헤픈엔딩; featuring Cho Won-sun of Roller Coaster) | Tablo | Tablo; Choice37 | Choice37 | 4:24 |
| 3. | "Rich" (featuring Taeyang) | Tablo | Tablo; DJ Tukutz | DJ Tukutz | 4:17 |
| 4. | "Spoiler" (스포일러) | Tablo | Tablo; P.K | P.K | 4:37 |
| 5. | "Burj Khalifa" (부르즈 할리파; featuring Yankie and Gaeko) | Tablo; Yankie; Gaeko | Tablo | Tablo | 4:25 |
| 6. | "We Fight Ourselves" (또 싸워; featuring Younha) | Tablo | Tablo | Tablo | 4:11 |
| 7. | "Amor Fati" (featuring Kim Jong-wan of Nell) | Tablo | Tablo | Tablo | 4:53 |
| 8. | "Born Hater" (featuring Beenzino, Verbal Jint, B.I, Mino, Bobby) | Tablo; Mithra Jin; Lim Sung-bin; Kim Jin-tae; B.I; Mino; Bobby | DJ Tukutz; B.I | DJ Tukutz | 5:27 |
| 9. | "Lesson 5 (Timeline)" (타임라인) | Tablo | Tablo; Peejay | Peejay | 3:21 |
| 10. | "Life Is Good" (featuring Jay Park) | Tablo | Tablo; Peejay | Peejay | 3:19 |
| 11. | "Eyes, Nose, Lips" (featuring Taeyang) | Tablo | Tablo; Teddy; Dee.P; P.K | DJ Tukutz | 3:33 |
| 12. | "Shoebox" (신발장; featuring MYK) | Tablo | DJ Tukutz; Mr. Sync; MYK | DJ Tukutz; Mr. Sync | 4:25 |
| Total length: | | | | | 51:35 |

Shoebox track listing – Japan edition
| No. | Title | Lyrics | Music | Arrangement | Length |
|---|---|---|---|---|---|
| 1. | "Encore" (Clean version) | Tablo; Mithra Jin | DJ Tukutz | DJ Tukutz | 4:34 |
| 2. | "Happen Ending" (featuring Lee Hi; Japanese mix) | Tablo | Tablo; Choice37 | Choice37 | 4:24 |
| 3. | "Rich" (featuring Sol of Big Bang) | Tablo | Tablo; DJ Tukutz | DJ Tukutz | 4:17 |
| 4. | "Spoiler" (featuring Taehyun of Winner; Japanese mix) | Tablo | Tablo; P.K | P.K | 4:38 |
| 5. | "Burj Khalifa" (Clean version) | Tablo; Mithra Jin | Tablo | Tablo | 3:13 |
| 6. | "We Fight Ourselves" (featuring Younha) | Tablo | Tablo | Tablo | 4:11 |
| 7. | "Amor Fati" (featuring Kim Jong-wan of Nell) | Tablo | Tablo | Tablo | 4:53 |
| 8. | "Born Hater" (feat. B.I, Bobby, Mino; Clean version) | Tablo; Mithra Jin; B.I; Mino; Bobby | DJ Tukutz; B.I | DJ Tukutz | 3:56 |
| 9. | "Lesson 5 (Timeline)" | Tablo | Tablo; Peejay | Peejay | 3:21 |
| 10. | "Life Is Good" (featuring Jay Park) | Tablo | Tablo; Peejay | Peejay | 3:19 |
| 11. | "Eyes, Nose, Lips" (featuring Sol of Big Bang; Clean version) | Tablo | Tablo; Teddy; Dee.P; P.K | DJ Tukutz | 3:33 |
| 12. | "Shoebox" (featuring MYK) | Tablo | DJ Tukutz; Mr. Sync; MYK | DJ Tukutz; Mr. Sync | 4:25 |
| 13. | "Happen Ending" (featuring Cho Won-sun of Roller Coaster; original version) | Tablo | Tablo; Choice37 | Choice37 | 4:24 |
| 14. | "Spoiler" (original version) | Tablo | Tablo; P.K | P.K | 4:38 |
| Total length: | | | | | 57:51 |

Shoebox track listing – Japan edition (DVD)
| No. | Title | Length |
|---|---|---|
| 1. | "Spoiler + Happen Ending (feat. Cho Won-sun of Roller Coaster) [Original Version] -Music Video-" |
| 2. | "Eyes, Nose, Lips (feat. SOL of BIGBANG) -Music Video-" |
| 3. | "Spoiler + Happen Ending (feat. Cho Won-sun of Roller Coaster) [Original Version] -Music Video Making-" |

Notes

- "Spoiler" contains uncredited vocals from Gong Hyo-jin.
- "Amor Fati" contains uncredited vocals from Taeyang.
- "Lesson 5 (Timeline)" contains uncredited vocals from Dok2.
- "Eyes, Nose, Lips" (featuring Taeyang) was originally a part of Taeyang's Eyes, Nose, Lips Cover Project.
- Most of the tracks on the Japanese edition of the album have cleaner lyrics and were edited to sound less aggressive and more suitable for younger audiences.

== Chart performance ==
=== Albums chart ===
| Chart | Peak position |
|---|---|
| Gaon Weekly albums chart | 3 |
| Gaon Monthly albums chart | 7 |
| Billboard World Albums | 1 |

== Release history ==
| Region | Format | Date | Label | Catalog |
|---|---|---|---|---|
| Worldwide | Digital download | October 21, 2014 | YG Entertainment | |
| South Korea | Digital download | October 21, 2014 | YG Entertainment | |
| South Korea | CD | October 22, 2014 | YG Entertainment | YGK0439 |
