= Epik High Is Here =

- Part 1 cover

Studio album by Epik High
- Released: January 18, 2021 (Part 1); February 14, 2022 (Part 2)
- Genre: Hip-hop; alternative hip-hop
- Length: 29:30 (Part 1); 39:15 (Part 2)
- Label: OURS; Genie Music

Epik High chronology
Sleepless in (2019)	Epik High Is Here (2021 & 2022)	Strawberry (2023)

Singles from Epik High Is Here, Part 1
- 1. "Rosario" Released: January 18, 2021; 2. "Based on a True Story" Released: January 18, 2021

Part 2 cover

Singles from Epik High Is Here, Part 2
- 1. "Rain Song" Released: June 29, 2021; 2. "Face ID" Released: October 25, 2021; 3. "Gray So Gray" Released: February 14, 2022

Professional ratings
Review scores
Source	Rating
NME	5/5 stars

Epik High Is Here is the tenth studio album by the hip-hop group Epik High. It was released in two parts: Part 1 was released on January 18, 2021, while Part 2 was released on February 14, 2022. Both versions were released through OURS Co. and distributed by Genie Music. "Rosario" and "Based On A True Story" served as singles from Part 1 while "Rain Song", "Face ID" and "Gray So Gray" served as singles from Part 2.

Epik High Is Here was well received by music critics. "Rosario" was named one of the 50 Best Songs of 2021 by Rolling Stone while British GQ named Part 2 in their list of the 29 best albums of 2022.

== Reception ==
Album critic lists
Publication	List	Work	Rank	Ref.
Rolling Stone India	10 Best K-Hip-Hop and R&B Albums of 2021	Part 1	5	
SCMP	25 Best K-pop Albums of 2021	Part 1	15	
British GQ	The 29 best albums of 2022	Part 2	No order	

Song critic lists
Publication	List	Work	Rank	Ref.
Marie Claire	The 20 Best K-pop Songs of 2021	"Rosario"	No order	
NME	The 25 Best K-pop Songs of 2021	"Rosario"	12	
The Ringer	The Best K-pop Songs of 2021	"Rosario"	5	
Rolling Stone	The 50 Best Songs of 2021	"Rosario"	40	
Teen Vogue	The 54 Best K-Pop Songs of 2021	"Rosario"	No order	

== Track listing ==
Epik High Is Here, Part 1 track listing
No.	Title	Lyrics	Music	Arrangement	Length
1.	"Lesson Zero"	Tablo; Hayley Gene Penner	Tablo; Rabitt; Penner	Tablo; Rabitt; Penner	2:23
2.	"Rosario" (featuring CL, Zico)	Tablo; Mithra Jin; Zico	DJ Tukutz; Tablo; Mighty Mike; Keta McCue	DJ Tukutz; Tablo; Mighty Mike; McCue	3:50
3.	"Based on a True Story" (내 얘기 같아; featuring Heize)	Tablo; Mithra Jin	DJ Tukutz; Tablo	Ryu Young-min	3:54
4.	"Acceptance Speech" (수상소감; featuring B.I)	Tablo; Mithra Jin; B.I	DJ Tukutz; B.I	DJ Tukutz	3:16
5.	"Leica" (featuring Kim Sa-wol)	Tablo; Mithra Jin	Tablo	Tablo	2:38
6.	"In Self-Defense" (정당방위; featuring Woo Won-jae, Nucksal, Changmo)	Tablo; Mithra Jin; Woo Won-jae; Nucksal; Changmo	Code Kunst; Tablo	Code Kunst	3:37
7.	"True Crime" (featuring Miso)	Tablo; Mithra Jin; Penner	DJ Tukutz; Tablo; Penner	DJ Tukutz; Tablo; Penner	3:38
8.	"Social Distance 16"	Tablo	DJ Tukutz	DJ Tukutz	1:04
9.	"End of the World" (featuring G.Soul)	Tablo; Mithra Jin; Sweettalker	Tablo; Mithra Jin; Mighty Mike; Sweettalker	Tablo; Mithra Jin; Mighty Mike; Sweettalker	3:34
10.	"Wish You Were"	Tablo	Tablo	Tablo	1:32
Total length:					29:30

Epik High Is Here, Part 2 track listing
No.	Title	Lyrics	Music	Arrangement	Length
1.	"Here"	Tablo	Tablo	Tablo	0:41
2.	"Prequel"	Tablo; Mithra Jin	DJ Tukutz; Tablo	DJ Tukutz	2:42
3.	"Super Rare" (featuring Wonstein, pH-1)	Tablo; Mithra Jin; Wonstein; pH-1	Tablo; Wonstein	Tablo	3:40
4.	"Gray So Gray" (그래서 그래; featuring Younha)	Tablo; Mithra Jin	Tablo; DJ Tukutz	DJ Tukutz; Mr. Sync	4:12
5.	"BRB"	Tablo; Mithra Jin	DJ Tukutz; Tablo	DJ Tukutz; Docskim	3:28
6.	"I Hated Myself (Tablo's Word)"	Tablo	Tablo	Tablo	3:15
7.	"Rain Song" (비 오는 날 듣기 좋은 노래; featuring Colde (Note: "Rain Song" contains uncredited vocals from Younha.))	Tablo; Mithra Jin	Tablo; DJ Tukutz	DJ Tukutz	4:05
8.	"Rich Kids Anthem" (featuring Lee Hi)	Tablo; Mithra Jin	Tablo; DJ Tukutz; Rabitt; Hayley Gene Penner	DJ Tukutz; Rabitt	3:37
9.	"Face ID" (featuring Giriboy, Sik-K, Justhis)	Tablo; Mithra Jin; Giriboy; Sik-K; Justhis	Tablo; DJ Tukutz; Mighty Mike; Sik-K	DJ Tukutz; Mighty Mike	3:37
10.	"Piano for Sale"		Tablo	Tablo	1:00
11.	"Family Portrait" (가족관계증명서; featuring Kim Feel)	Tablo; Mithra Jin	Tablo	Tablo	4:46
12.	"Champagne"	Tablo; Mithra Jin	Tablo; DJ Tukutz	DJ Tukutz	4:06
Total length:					39:15

== Charts ==
=== Weekly charts ===
Chart performance for Epik High Is Here, Part 1
Chart (2021)	Peak position
South Korean Albums (Gaon)	7

Chart performance for Epik High Is Here, Part 2
Chart (2022)	Peak position
South Korean Albums (Gaon)	17

=== Monthly charts ===
Monthly chart performance for Epik High Is Here, Part 1
Chart (2022)	Peak position
South Korean Albums (Gaon)	33

Monthly chart performance for Epik High Is Here, Part 2
Chart (2022)	Peak position
South Korean Albums (Gaon)	69
