= Fly (Epik High song) =

Single by Epik High

from the album Swan Songs
- Released: October 4, 2005
- Genre: K-pop, Hip hop/rap
- Length: 3:22
- Label: Woollim; CJ Music
- Composer: Tablo
- Lyricists: Tablo, Mithra Jin

Fly is a song by South Korean hip hop group Epik High, released on October 4, 2005 as one of the promoted tracks from their third studio album Swan Songs. It features singer Amin J., one of the vocalists of the R&B indie group Soulciety.

== Composition ==
The song incorporates elements of R&B and electronica and utilizes a vocalist to sing the refrain in between Tablo and Mithra Jin's raps. The introduction includes scratching by turntablist DJ Tukutz, who performed live with the other members during their music program promotions. The lyrics were a departure from Epik High's trademark social commentary and instead offers encouragement to "those who are having a hard time in life that even those without wings can fly".

The music video features all three members acting in a realistic parody of a police hostage situation and was filmed in Gwangju. However, it was subsequently banned from being broadcast on terrestrial television networks due to "scenes that encourage juvenile delinquency". In a 2009 appearance on the talk show Strong Heart, Tablo subsequently revealed that they were also not allowed to discuss the music video on promotional interviews due to those scenes.

== Reception ==
The album was released with the expectation that it would be Epik High's final album due to the lack of commercial success of their first two albums. "Fly" unexpectedly became a hit due to its departure from the R&B or bubblegum pop that was more prevalent in mainstream Korean music at that time. Its success in the charts led Epik High to reconsider disbandment and spawned a reissue album and a Japanese remake. While it garnered them broader public recognition, the song also drew some backlash from the underground hip hop community for incorporating elements of pop music and collaborating with a singer rather than another rapper. The Epik High members acknowledged the criticism but reiterated their position on not being defined by any specific genre.

=== Accolades ===
"Fly" is the first song by a hip hop artist to win first place on a music program, having won on the very first episode of MBC's revamped Show! Music Core and went on to win a "Triple Crown".

Music program awards
Song	Program	Date
"Fly"	Show! Music Core	October 29, 2005
"Fly"	Show! Music Core	November 5, 2005
"Fly"	Show! Music Core	November 12, 2005
"Fly"	M Countdown	November 10, 2005
"Fly"	Inkigayo	November 27, 2005

Awards and nominations
Year	Organization	Category	Work	Result	Ref.
2005	Golden Disc Awards	Hip-Hop Award	"Fly"	Won	
2005	Melon Music Awards	Song of the Year	"Fly"	Won	
2005	Mnet KM Music Video Festival	Best Hip-Hop Performance	"Fly"	Won	
2006	Korean Music Awards	Best Hip Hop Song	"Fly"	Nominated	

== In popular culture ==
The song was featured in the soundtrack of the video game FIFA 07 the following year.
