= Remapping the Human Soul =

Studio album by Epik High
- Released: January 23, 2007
- Recorded: 2005–2006
- Genre: K-pop; hip hop
- Length: 1:36:00
- Language: Korean
- Label: Woollim; CJ Music
- Producer: DJ Tukutz; Tablo; Pe2ny

Epik High chronology
Black Swan Songs (2006)	Remapping the Human Soul (2007)	Pieces, Part One (2008)

Singles from Remapping the Human Soul
- 1. "Fan" Released: January 23, 2007; 2. "Love Love Love" Released: January 23, 2007

Remapping the Human Soul is the fourth studio album by South Korean hip hop trio Epik High. It was released through Woollim Entertainment and CJ Music on January 23, 2007, and contains 27 tracks on two CDs. The singles "Fan" and "Love Love Love" were promoted as part of the album.

The album was a commercial success in South Korea, peaking at number one on the monthly RIAK album chart for two consecutive months. It was the 3rd best-selling album of 2007 with over 120,000 copies sold. It went on to win awards such as Album of the Year at the 2007 Mnet Asian Music Awards, Best Album at the 2007 Seoul Music Awards, and Best Hip Hop Album at the 2008 Korean Music Awards.

== Background ==
Following the popularity of the single "Fly" from their 2005 album, Swan Songs, Epik High spent a year and a half writing over 200 new songs. The group ultimately recorded 47 of those songs and selected 27 to include on Remapping the Human Soul. Due to the album's controversial subject matter covering topics including sex, religion, and war, the album had its sales age-restricted, and some of its songs were banned from being played on South Korean radio stations.

== Composition ==
Part 2 (The Heart), which was produced by Tablo, is influenced by Philip Glass, Billy Corgan, Timbaland. He also has emphasised his interest in rock, jazz, trance, garage, as well as hip hop. Various tracks contain samples of other songs, including "The End Times (Opening)" with "真実の爆弾(Shinjitsu no bakudan)" by King Giddra, "White Night" with "Nothing Can Stop Me" by Marilyn McCoo and Billy Davis Jr., "Mr. Doctor" with "Hasta Siempre" by Soledad Bravo, "Nocturne (Tablo's Word)" with "Once Upon a Time" by Donna Summer, "중독" with "Flashback" by Dee Dee Sharp, and "Broken Toys" with "Half Forgotten Daydreams" by John Cameron.

== Accolades ==
Rolling Stone named "Love Love Love" the 70th greatest song in the history of Korean popular music, writing that "Epik High takes the listener through all the stages of love, from blissful infatuation to a painful breakup. Capturing the chemistry of MCs Tablo and Mithra Jin, while DJ Tukutz backspins a record like it’s 1975, it’s an eternal bop." In 2024, EBS named Remapping the Human Soul one of the 100 best Korean popular music albums since 2004.

Awards and nominations
Organization	Year	Category	Work	Result	Ref.
Cyworld Digital Music Awards	2007	Song of the Month – February	"Fan"	Won	
Golden Disc Awards	2007	Digital Song Bonsang	"Fan"	Nominated	
Golden Disc Awards	2007	Album Bonsang	Remapping the Human Soul	Won	
Golden Disc Awards	2007	Album Daesang	Remapping the Human Soul	Nominated	
Mnet KM Music Festival	2007	Song of the Year (Daesang)	"Fan"	Nominated	
Mnet KM Music Festival	2007	Best Hip-Hop Performance	"Fan"	Won	
Mnet KM Music Festival	2007	Album of the Year (Daesang)	Remapping the Human Soul	Won	
Seoul Music Awards	2008	Best Album Award	Remapping the Human Soul	Won	
Korean Music Awards	2008	Best Hip Hop Album	Remapping the Human Soul	Won	

Music program awards
Song	Program	Date
"Fan"	M Countdown	February 15, 2007
"Fan"	M Countdown	March 1, 2007
"Fan"	M Countdown	March 15, 2007
"Fan"	Inkigayo	March 4, 2007
"Fan"	Inkigayo	March 11, 2007

== Track listing ==
Track listing and credits adapted from Naver Music, Google Play, and the Korea Music Copyright Association.

CD 1 : Part 1 - The Brain
No.	Title	Lyrics	Music	Length
1.	"The End Times (Opening)"	—	DJ Tukutz	1:45
2.	"白夜" (White Night)	Tablo, Mithra Jin	DJ Tukutz	5:16
3.	"알고보니" (As it Turns Out) (feat. Jinbo)	Tablo, Mithra Jin, Jinbo	DJ Tukutz	4:10
4.	"실어증" (Aphasia) (feat. Paloalto)	Tablo, Mithra Jin, Paloalto	Pe2ny	4:41
5.	"Mr. Doctor" (feat. Yankie)	Tablo, Mithra Jin, Yankie	Yankie	3:58
6.	"Runaway (Mithra's Word)"	Mithra Jin	Mithra Jin	4:05
7.	"Exile (Halftime)"	—	Pe2ny	3:09
8.	"Still Life" (feat. Jinbo, The Quiett, Kebee, TBNY, MC Meta)	Tablo, Mithra Jin, Yankie, Topbob, Naachal, The Quiett, Kebee, Jinbo	DJ Tukutz	5:39
9.	"피해망상 (Paranoia) Pt. 1" (feat. Junggigo)	Tablo, Mithra Jin, Junggigo	DJ Tukutz, Junggigo	4:34
10.	"희생양" (Scapegoat) (feat. Sweet Sorrow)	Tablo, Mithra Jin	Tablo	4:33
11.	"Nocturne (Tablo's Word)"	Tablo	DJ Tukutz	4:48
12.	"혼" (Soul)	Tablo, Mithra Jin	—	4:26
13.	"In Peace (Closing)"	—	DJ Tukutz	1:25

CD 2 : Part 2 - The Heart
No.	Title	Lyrics	Music	Length
1.	"Slave Song (Overture)"	Tablo	Tablo	1:38
2.	"Flow" (feat. Emi Hinouchi)	Tablo, Mithra Jin	Tablo	3:33
3.	"Love/Crime (Fan Prelude)"	—	Tablo	0:23
4.	"Fan"	Tablo, Mithra Jin	Tablo	3:44
5.	"거미줄" (Spider Web) (feat. Itta)	Tablo, Mithra Jin	Tablo	4:41
6.	"선곡표" (Track List) (feat. DJ Zio)	Tablo, Mithra Jin	DJ Zio	3:34
7.	"중독" (Poison) (feat. Wanted)	Tablo, Mithra Jin	Pe2ny	4:20
8.	"Underground Railroad (Intermission)"	—	Pe2ny	3:22
9.	"FAQ"	Tablo, Mithra Jin	Tablo	2:36
10.	"Love Love Love" (feat. Lee Yoong Jin)	Tablo, Mithra Jin	Tablo	3:51
11.	"Girl Rock" (feat. Jiae)	Tablo, Mithra Jin	Tablo	3:22
12.	"Broken Toys" (feat. Infinite Flow)	Tablo, Mithra Jin, Bizniz, Nuck	Tablo	4:05
13.	"행복합니다" (I Am Happy) (feat. Kim Jong-wan of Nell)	Tablo, Mithra Jin	Kim Jong-wan	3:35
14.	"Public Execution (Finale)"	—	Tablo	0:51

== Charts and sales ==
=== Monthly charts ===
Chart (2007)	Peak position
South Korean Albums (RIAK)	1

=== Year-end charts ===
Chart (2007)	Position
South Korean Albums (RIAK)	3

=== Sales ===
Region	Sales
South Korea (RIAK)	130,000
