= Sleepless in =

EP by South Korean hip hop group Epik High

Sleepless in __________

EP by Epik High
- Released: March 11, 2019
- Length: 20:51
- Language: Korean; English
- Label: OURS; Genie Music

Epik High chronology
| We've Done Something Wonderful (2017) | Sleepless in __________ (2019) | Epik High Is Here, Part 1 (2021) |

Singles from Sleepless in __________
- 1. "Lovedrunk" Released: March 11, 2019

Sleepless in __________ is the second extended play by South Korean hip hop group Epik High. The EP was released on March 11, 2019, through OURS Co. and distributed by Genie Music.

== Accolades ==
Awards and nominations
| Year | Award-giving body | Category | Nominee | Result | Ref. |
|---|---|---|---|---|---|
| 2019 | Gaon Chart Music Awards | Song of the Year — March | "Lovedrunk" | Nominated | |
| 2019 | Melon Music Awards | Best Rap/Hip Hop Award Award | "Lovedrunk" | Won | |
| 2019 | Mnet Asian Music Awards | Best HipHop & Urban Music | "Lovedrunk" | Nominated | |

Music program awards
| Song | Program | Date | Ref. |
|---|---|---|---|
| "Lovedrunk" | Music Bank | March 22, 2019 | |
| "Lovedrunk" | Inkigayo | March 24, 2019 | |

== Track listing ==
Credits adapted from Naver and Apple Music.

| No. | Title | Lyrics | Music | Arrangement | Length |
|---|---|---|---|---|---|
| 1. | "Sleepless" | Tablo | Tablo | Tablo | 1:04 |
| 2. | "In Seoul" (featuring Sunwoo Jung-a) | Tablo; Mithra Jin | Tablo; Tukutz | Tukutz | 3:42 |
| 3. | "Lovedrunk" (술이 달다; (Note: Suri dalda lit. "Alcohol is sweet") featuring Crush) | Tablo; Mithra Jin | Tablo; Tukutz | Tukutz | 4:10 |
| 4. | "Eternal Sunshine" (새벽에 (Note: Saebyeoge lit. "At dawn")) | Tablo; Mithra Jin | Tablo; Suga; El Capitxn | Suga; El Capitxn | 3:25 |
| 5. | "No Different" (featuring Yuna) | Tablo; Ilsey Juber | Tablo; Code Kunst; Ilsey Juber | Code Kunst | 3:20 |
| 6. | "Rain Again Tomorrow" (비가 온대 내일도 (Note: Biga ondae naeildo lit. "It's raining, tomorrow too")) | Tablo; Mithra Jin | Tablo | Tablo; Tukutz | 2:59 |
| 7. | "Lullaby for a Cat" | Tablo | Tablo | Tablo | 2:11 |
| Total length: | | | | | 20:55 |

== Charts ==
| Chart (2019) | Peak position |
|---|---|
| South Korean Albums (Gaon) | 8 |
| US World Albums (Billboard) | 6 |

== Release history ==
| Country | Date | Format | Label | Ref. |
|---|---|---|---|---|
| South Korea | March 11, 2019 | CD; digital download; streaming | OURS; Genie Music | |
| Various | March 11, 2019 | Digital download, streaming | OURS; Genie Music | |
