= Strawberry (EP) =

EP by Epik High
- Released: February 1, 2023
- Genre: Hip-hop
- Length: 12:08
- Language: Korean; English
- Label: OURS; Genie Music

Epik High chronology
Epik High Is Here (Part 2) (2022)	Strawberry (2023)	Screen Time (2023)

Singles from Strawberry
- 1. "Catch" Released: February 1, 2023

Professional ratings
Review scores
Source	Rating
NME	4/5 stars

Strawberry is the third extended play and first global album by South Korean hip-hop trio Epik High. The EP was released on February 1, 2023, through OURS Co. and distributed by Genie Music. The album consists of five tracks, including the lead single "Catch" featuring Hwasa of Mamamoo, and a collaboration with Got7's Jackson Wang on the song "On My Way".

All the tracks on the album were written or co-written by Tablo and Mithra Jin of Epik High; and were co-produced by DJ Tukutz and Tablo of Epik High, along with collaborations from Grammy-winning producers on a few of the tracks. Strawberry follows Epik High's tenth studio album Epik High Is Here (2021–2022).

Describing why the album is called Strawberry, Epik High's leader Tablo explained, "We like strawberry representing the album because it’s sweet and fresh, which is what we wanted to do at the beginning of our 20th anniversary. We thought that people would expect some music that is reminiscing and weighed down by the years, and we wanted to go against that expectation and just create something that sounds like three guys that just decided to create a group together. But strawberries are interesting because they’re so fragile; you can smash them up with your thumb but, somehow, they’ll stain on your table perfectly fine. And it reminds me of blood when it’s squished. So, there’s a little bit of pain in that sweetness. I think that that’s what Epik High is."

== Background and release ==
On December 6, 2022, along with the announcement of Epik High's 2023 All Time High Tour across Europe and North America, Tablo teased "New music is coming soon..." on his social media accounts. On January 9, 2023, he confirmed that Epik High is indeed working on a new album. Then on January 18, the title of the EP was announced to be Strawberry, to feature five tracks, and to be released on February 1, 2023.

On January 25, 2023, the complete tracklist, including collaborations with Jackson Wang on "On My Way" and Hwasa on "Catch", was revealed. Epik High said in a press release that they "aim to introduce a well-made album that encompasses the colorful characteristics of diverse producers and artists infused with the Epik High trio's symbolic musical color." Epik High appeared on the Hwasa Show on January 28, and performed an exclusive pre-release of "Catch" featuring Hwasa, prior to the release of the album. Two days later, the EP's sampler was released.

Strawberry was mainly promoted using memes posted by Tablo and fans on social media. The EP was released to digital music and streaming platforms on February 1, 2023. The accompanying visualizer videos for all five tracks were released on Epik High's official YouTube channel. In addition to the five tracks, the album's CDs included instrumentals for all the tracks.

== Track listing ==
Strawberry track listing
No.	Title	Lyrics	Music	Length
1.	"Strawberry"		DJ Tukutz; Lee Ji-hoon	1:28
2.	"On My Way" (featuring Jackson Wang)	Tablo; Mithra Jin	Tablo; Nick Lee; Gino the Ghost; Mason Sacks	3:03
3.	"Catch" (featuring Hwasa)	Tablo; Mithra Jin	DJ Tuktuz; Tablo; Will Leong; Anthony Watts	3:44
4.	"Down Bad Freestyle"	Tablo	DJ Tukutz; Tablo	1:28
5.	"God's Latte"	Tablo; Mithra Jin	DJ Tukutz; Tablo	2:23
Total length:				12:08

Strawberry CD bonus track
No.	Title	Length
6.	"Strawberry" (instrumental)	1:28
7.	"On My Way" (featuring Jackson Wang; instrumental)	3:03
8.	"Catch" (featuring Hwasa; instrumental)	3:44
9.	"Down Bad Freestyle" (instrumental)	1:28
10.	"God's Latte" (instrumental)	2:23
Total length:		24:12

== Charts ==
Chart performance for Strawberry
Chart (2022)	Peak position
South Korean Albums (Circle)	33

== Release history ==
Release dates and formats for Strawberry
Region	Date	Format(s)	Label	Ref.
Various	February 1, 2023	Digital download; streaming	OURS; Genie Music	
South Korea	February 1, 2023	CD	OURS; Genie Music	
