= Pieces, Part One =

Studio album by Epik High
- Released: April 17, 2008
- Recorded: 2007–2008 at Ark Studio, Seoul
- Genre: Alternative hip hop, hip hop, pop, trance
- Length: 74:32
- Language: Korean, English
- Label: Woollim Entertainment; CJ Music
- Producer: Epik High

Epik High chronology
Remapping the Human Soul (2007)	Pieces, Part One (2008)	Lovescream (2008)

Pieces, Part One is the fifth studio album by Korean hip-hop group Epik High, released on April 17, 2008. A repackaged version of the album was released with a remix version of "Love Love Love".

== Track listing ==
#	Title	Meaning	Subtitle	Songwriter(s)	Featured guest(s)	Lyrics by	Language
1	"Be"		"Purgatorium"	Tablo		Tablo	Korean; English
2	"Breakdown"		"Fin de siecle"	Tablo		Tablo, Mithra Jin	Korean; English
3	"서울, 1:13 AM" [Short Piece]	"Seoul, 1:13 AM"	"The Great Sin"	Tablo		Tablo, DJ Tukutz (short conversation)	Korean
4	"One"		"Crown of Thorns"	Tablo	Jisun of Loveholic	Tablo, Mithra Jin	Korean; English
5	"연필깎이"	"Pencil Sharpener" (Yeonpilkkakki)	"The Carpenter"	Tablo	Kebee	Tablo, Mithra Jin	Korean; English
6	"Girl"		"Eve"	DJ Tukutz	Jinbo	Tablo, Mithra Jin	Korean; English
7	"Slave" [Short Piece]		"Conspiracy"	DJ Tukutz	David Lee	Tablo (poem recitation)	English
8	"The Future"		"Trinity"	DJ Tukutz	Yankie of TBNY	Tablo, Mithra Jin, Yankie	Korean; English
9	"20 Fingers" [Short Piece]		"Discord"	DJ Tukutz	DJ Friz		
10	"Ignition"		"Bad Samaritan"	DJ Tukutz	Na Yoon-Kwon	Tablo, Mithra Jin	Korean; English; French
11	"Eight by Eight"		"Hubris"	DJ Tukutz * Contains a sample from "It's Been A Long Time" by Rakim and "It Ain't Hard to Tell" by Nas	Dynamic Duo, Dok2, Double K, TBNY	Tablo, Mithra Jin, Dynamic Duo, Dok2, Double K, TBNY, MC Han	Korean; English
12	"Décalcomanie" (Mithra Jin solo)		"Division of Self"	Mithra Jin		Mithra Jin	Korean
13	"Icarus Walks" [Short Piece]		"The Great Fall"	Tablo			
14	"낙화 (落花)" (Tablo solo)	"The Falling Flower"(Nakhwa)	"Ophelia's Flower"	Tablo		Tablo	Korean; English
15	"우산"	"Umbrella"(Usan)	"Salvation"	Tablo	Younha	Tablo, Mithra Jin	Korean; English
16	"당신의 조각들"	"Your Pieces" (Dangsinui jogakdeul)	"Return to the Father"	Tablo	Jisun	Tablo, Mithra Jin	Korean
*	"Breakdown (Supreme Mix)" (B-Side 01)			Tablo		Tablo, Mithra Jin	English; Korean
*	"One (Planet Shiver Remix)" (B-Side 02)			Tablo	Jisun of Loveholic, Planet Shiver (DJ Friz + Dh-Style)	Tablo, Mithra Jin	
