= 22nd Golden Disc Awards =

2007 South Korean music awards ceremony

- Date: December 14, 2007
- Location: Olympic Hall, Olympic Park, Seoul
- Country: South Korea
- Hosted by: Ryu Si-won; Kim Ah-joong

Television/radio coverage
- Network: Mnet, KMTV

The 22nd Golden Disc Awards ceremony was held on December 14, 2007, at the Olympic Hall in the Olympic Park, Seoul. Ryu Si-won and Kim Ah-joong served as hosts.

== Criteria ==
Albums and songs released between December 1, 2006, and November 30, 2007, were eligible to be nominated for the 22nd Golden Disc Awards. This was the first year that bonsangs were awarded in the digital music category. The winners of the album and rookie categories were determined by album sales (60%), a panel of music experts (20%) and online votes (20%), while the winners of the digital music category were determined by digital music sales (60%), a panel of music experts (20%) and online votes (20%). Music sales were based on data from Dosirak, Melon, Muz, MusicOn, Bugs! and Mnet. The Popularity Award was based on online votes (60%) and a panel of music experts (40%).

== Winners and nominees ==
=== Main awards ===
Winners and nominees are listed in alphabetical order. Winners are listed first and emphasized in bold.

Digital Daesang (Song of the Year)	Album Daesang (Album of the Year)
**Ivy – "If You're Gonna Be Like This"**; SeeYa – "Love's Greetings"; Wonder Girls – "Tell Me"	**SG Wannabe – The Sentimental Chord**; Big Bang – Bigbang Vol.1; Epik High – Remapping the Human Soul; Shin Hye-sung – The Beginning, New Days; Super Junior – Don't Don; Wheesung – Eternal Essence of Music; Yangpa – The Windows of My Soul
Digital Song Bonsang	Album Bonsang
**Ivy – "If You're Gonna Be Like This"**; **SeeYa – "Love's Greetings"**; **Wonder Girls – "Tell Me"**; Baek Ji-young – "All I Need Is Your Love"; Big Bang – "Lies"; Big Mama – "Betrayal"; Epik High – "Fan"; Eru – "Because We Are Two"; F.T. Island – "Lovesick"; Lee Hyori – "Toc Toc Toc"; Lee Ki-chan – "Beautiful Woman"; MC Mong – "So Fresh" (feat. Kim Tae-woo); The Nuts – "Nagging"; Park Hyo-shin – "Memories Resembles Love"; SG Wannabe – "Arirang"; Tei – "Same Pillow"; V.O.S – "Everyday"; Wheesung – "Delicious Love"; Yangpa – "Love... What is It?"; Younha – "Password 486"	**Big Bang – Bigbang Vol.1**; **Epik High – Remapping the Human Soul**; **SG Wannabe – The Sentimental Chord**; **Shin Hye-sung – The Beginning, New Days**; **Super Junior – Don't Don**; **Wheesung – Eternal Essence of Music**; **Yangpa – The Windows of My Soul**; Baek Ji-young – The Sixth Miracle; Big Mama – Blossom; Bobby Kim – Follow Your Soul; Brown Eyed Soul – The Wind, The Sea, The Rain; Clazziquai Project – Love Child of the Century; Dynamic Duo – Enlightened; Eru – Eru Returns; Fly to the Sky – No Limitations; F.T. Island – Cheerful Sensibility; Girls' Generation – Girls' Generation; Ivy – A Sweet Moment; Kim Dong-wan – Kim Dong-wan Is; Kim Gun-mo – Style Album 11: Scarecrow; Lee Juck – Songs Made of Wood; Lee Min-woo – Explore M; Lee Seung-chul – The Secret of Color 2; Lee Soo-young – Set It Down; Lim Jeong-hee – Before I Go, J-Lim; Lyn – The Pride of the Morning; MC the Max – Returns; Park Hyo-shin – The Breeze of Sea; Park Sang-min – Park Sang-min 11th Album; SeeYa – Lovely Sweet Heart; Tei – Lover; V.O.S; Yoon Mi-rae – t 3 Yoonmirae; Younha – Gobaek Ha Gi Joheun Nal
Best Trot Award	Best Hip-Hop Award
**Jang Yoon-jeong – "First Love"**; Jang So-ra – "I Love You"; Jung So-nyeo – "Kkamppak"; Park Hyun-bin – "Just Trust Me"; Park Sang-chul – "Flower Wind"	**Dynamic Duo – "Attendance Check" (feat. Naul)**; Crown J – "I'm Gonna Steal Her"; Drunken Tiger – "8:45 Heaven"; Epik High – "Fan"; Leessang – "Ballerino"; Lexy – "Above the Sky"; MC Sniper – "Come Unto Spring"; Vasco – "Deombyeora Sesanga"; Yang Dong-geun – "I'm Bad"
Rookie Artist of the Year	Popularity Award
**F.T. Island**; **Wonder Girls**; **Younha**; **Girls' Generation**; Baby Vox Re.V; Cats; JC Ji-eun; Kara; Kim Jong-wook; Koo Jung-hyun; K.Will; Storm; Supernova	**F.T. Island**; **Girls' Generation**; **Super Junior**; **Wonder Girls**; Baek Ji-young; Battle; Big Bang; Big Mama; Brian; Brown Eyed Soul; Brown Eyes; Bobby Kim; Chae Yeon; Clazziquai Project; Dynamic Duo; Epik High; Eru; Fly to the Sky; The Grace; Ivy; Kim Dong-wan; Kim Gun-mo; Lee Hyori; Lee Juck; Lee Ki-chan; Lee Min-woo; Lee Seung-chul; Lee Seung-gi; Lee Soo-young; Lim Jeong-hee; Lyn; MC Mong; MC Sniper; MC the Max; Monday Kiz; The Nuts; Park Hyo-shin; Park Sang-min; SeeYa; SG Wannabe; Shin Hye-sung; Tei; Wheesung; Yangpa; Yoon Gun; Younha

=== Other awards ===
- Ceci Special Award: Kim Ah-joong
- Producer Award: Park Jin-young
