= Born Hater =

Single by Epik High

from the album Shoebox
- Released: October 18, 2014
- Genre: K-pop, R&B, Hip hop/rap
- Length: 5:35
- Label: YG Entertainment
- Composer(s): DJ Tukutz, B.I
- Lyricist(s): Tablo, Mithra Jin, Lim Sung-bin, Kim Jin-tae, B.I, Mino, Bobby

Music video
- "Born Hater" on YouTube

"Born Hater" is a song by South Korean hip hop group Epik High, released on October 18, 2014, as one of their single tracks from their eighth Korean studio album, Shoebox. The song features rappers Beenzino, Verbal Jint, B.I, Mino, and Bobby.

== Background and development ==
On October 13, 2014, YG Entertainment announced with a poster that Epik High would be the next artist to release an album in 2014 after Akdong Musician. The album Shoebox, which was announced to be released on October 21, was their first album release in two years. It was even delayed one week from its initial announcement due to the music video shoot taking longer than expected. On October 14, the group released the full tracks included in the album, including "Born Hater" as the eighth track.

On October 15, the featured artists in "Born Hater" single were announced through YG Entertainment’s official blog. The artists include veteran rapper Verbal Jint, Illionaire Records's Beenzino, Mino from WINNER, and B.I and Bobby from iKON.

== Release and promotion ==
On October 18, the single was pre-released through their YouTube account as a part of the album's promotion. The next day, a short snippet of the song was included in the album sampler uploaded on the same account, along with the other tracks in the album.

Besides their concerts and fan meetings, Epik High also performed "Born Hater" in various awards shows and end-of-year celebrations. At the 2014 Mnet Asian Music Awards, in which the group received the Best Rap Performance award for the fifth time, Epik High performed the single along with Mino, B.I, and Bobby. They also performed it during the 4th Gaon Chart K-Pop Awards with WINNER's Kang Seung-yoon and Mino, as well as a modified version at the SBS Gayo Daejun with Mino, B.I, and Bobby.

== Composition ==
Musically, "Born Hater" incorporates distorted bass beat creating 90's hip hop sound. Just as the album's title, 'Shoebox', is said to represent the group's life struggles in recent years, the lyrics of "Born Hater" were written to express their emotions, specifically their thoughts on their 'haters'. Specifically, member Tablo mentions in his rap his long-time persecution by the group called 'TaJinYo', a group of anonymous Internet users who had previously undertaken a witch-hunt against what they alleged was Tablo's falsified academic credentials. They threatened his family and accused him of lying about his degrees from Stanford University, a bachelor's degree and master's degree in English and Creative Writing, respectively, which he completed in just three and a half years, despite the university speaking on his behalf and the public release of various confirming documents. That incident had led the group to a hiatus of almost two years back in 2010.

The phrase "that's No No", sung by B.I, was popularized by Masta Wu during one of his interviews during the third season of the Show Me the Money television rap competition series in 2014.

Because of the usage of profanity and vulgar expressions, several South Korean music television broadcasters, namely KBS, SBS, and MBC, did not allow the original uncensored version of "Born Hater", along with their other album tracks, to be broadcast as the songs were deemed inappropriate for the public television audience. However, Billboard gave its praise to the album writing: "Shoebox is a brilliant summation of Epik High's signature perceptive storytelling."

== Music video ==
=== Background ===
Created by Digipedi, the music video was filmed vertically and not covering the entire width of the screen for easier viewing for smart phones. The vertical style was quite novel for music videos produced at that time, so Born Hater continues to be praised for innovating this style before TikTok and other platforms made short-form content more mainstream. Comical and witty scenes are accompanied by the blunt lyrics, along with the eight featured artists.

On October 24, the cast and crew at the music video filming location were offered snacks from a movable cafe and food track prepared by Tablo, as seen by his post on his Instagram account.

A few weeks later after its release, Epik High released a 5-minute behind-the-scenes footage on November 20. It includes individual interviews for each rapper and the story behind their individual rap lyrics. Tablo stated that the music video is meant to make the people laugh after hardships.

=== Synopsis ===
The music video, running for five minutes and thirty-five seconds, begins with the display of the song title and the singers on a washroom door. The door opens to reveal DJ Tukutz and the beat of the song begins; he is seen moving around a narrow bathroom stall, holding and playing his turntables and MPC while his other equipment is on the floor. The camera then shifts right, to the next stall over, where Tablo begins his rap; his stall has famous paintings on the walls by "Dali, Van, Picasso" (per his opening line), except they are crossed out with red tape. Cockroaches are all around and on him, and in his other shots he is seen killing some of them. Tablo also dresses as a stereotypical painter with his beret and glasses.

Once Tablo's verse ends, the camera again moves right to Beenzino's stall, helping the viewer understand that there is a row of at least eight bathroom stalls, each occupied by one of the featured artists. Furthermore, in Beenzino's verse, he raps "Blo hyung [...] is in the room next to me" and the camera briefly shifts left to show Tablo in his stall next door.

The video then cuts to several shots of Beenzino, Verbal Jint, Mithra, Mino, and Bobby, respectively, as they rap their verses. Before B.I does his rap, B.I sings the chorus two times; he is seen wearing an all-white janitor's uniform. At the time that he sings his rap part, shots of him along with the members of Epik High and four women are seen squeezed inside a narrow cubicle. Jeon Somin was one of the women part of this penultimate shot.

As confirmed by Tablo, the music video was inspired by the seven deadly sins - each bathroom stall embodies a vice, and B.I represents the good/pure opposing force. In order of appearance:

1. DJ Tukutz as Envy

For this connection to make sense, one must know the context outside of the video. DJ Tukutz is the only one who doesn't rap nor sing in Epik High, so he is notoriously the forgotten member. Out of all the people who know the group, there are unfortunately many who cannot identify DJ Tukutz. ~~In one famous example, his face was blurred out of a red carpet photo because the journalist assumed he was Epik High's manager.~~ As the only one without lines in the song, he could be envious of the others who do.

2. Tablo as Pride

3. Beenzino as Sloth

4. Verbal Jint as Lust

5. Mithra as Gluttony

6. Mino as Wrath

7. Bobby as Greed

8. B.I as Pure

Finally, the video ends with a splash of white screen after B.I splashes water on the screen; the text "EPIK HIGH IS BACK" and the date "2014.10.21.0AM" below it are displayed.

== Charts ==
Chart	Peak position	Sales
Gaon Singles Chart	3	
Gaon Monthly Singles chart	36	
Gaon Yearly Singles chart	76	
Gaon Streaming Singles chart	4	3,920,361
Gaon Download Singles chart	3	852,352
