= Yeahwon Shin =

Yeahwon Shin is a vocalist born in South Korea.

She has performed with Egberto Gismonti. Her debut album entitled Yeahwon (2010) received a Latin Grammy nomination for "Best Musica Popular Brasileira Album" in 2011. Her second album Lua Ya was released in August 2013 by ECM with pianist Aaron Parks and accordionist Rob Curto.

== Discography ==
- Yeahwon (ArtistShare, 2010)
- Lua Ya (ECM, 2013) – recorded in 2012
