= Black Swan Songs =

Black Swan Songs (album)

Remix album by Epik High
- Released: February 13, 2006
- Genres: K-pop, hip hop
- Languages: Korean, English
- Labels: Woollim Entertainment; CJ Music

Epik High chronology
Swan Songs (2005)	Black Swan Songs (album) (2006)	Remapping the Human Soul (2007)

Black Swan Songs is a remix album in 2006 by Epik High. This is Epik High's first repackage album.

== Track listing ==
Disc 1

Disc 2

1. 사진첩 (Photo Album)
2. Paris (정재일's Black Swan Remix)(featuring Jisun of Loveholic)
3. Lesson 3 (Street T's Street Cred Remix)(featuring MC Meta)
4. Swan Songs (Pe2ny's Sweet Music Remix)(featuring TBNY)
5. Lesson 1 (Supreme T's Ghetto Child Remix)
6. Follow The Flow (Street's Diamond Remix)(featuring Tiger JK)
7. Lesson 2 (Instrumental)
8. Fly (Instrumental)
9. Innisfree Remix [Hidden Track]
