= Epilogue (album) =

Studio album by Epik High
- Released: March 9, 2010
- Genre: Hip hop; K-pop; pop rock; acoustic; instrumental
- Length: 30:45
- Language: Korean, English
- Label: Woollim Entertainment, Mnet Media, Map The Soul
- Producer: Epik High

Epik High chronology
[e] (2009)	Epilogue (2010)	99 (2012)

Epilogue is a special release album from Korean hip-hop group Epik High. The album is a collection of unreleased tracks from the group's discography spanning 7 years and 11 albums. It is also the first album released without DJ Tukutz, who had enlisted for mandatory military service in October 2009. It is also the group's final release under Woollim Entertainment.

Epilogue debuted #1 on the U.S. iTunes Music Store digital hip-hop/rap charts in addition to charting at #1 in New Zealand, #2 in Australia, #3 in Canada, #9 in Japan, #22 in France, #40 in Germany, and #60 in the United Kingdom.

The music video for the lead single "Run," premiered on March 8, 2010, featuring L from Infinite. In the music video of "Run", others Infinite members also participate: Sunggyu (Guitar), Woohyun (Bass), Sungyeol (Drum), and Sungjong (Keyboard). They acted as supporting "band" in the background.

== Track listing ==
All tracks are written by Tablo, except "Run" by Tablo and Philtre.

No.	Title	Length
1.	"서랍 (Drawers)"	1:14
2.	"Run"	3:30
3.	"바보 (Fool) (featuring Bumkey)"	4:02
4.	"Wordkill"	3:18
5.	"Blossom"	2:22
6.	"비늘 (Scales) (featuring Yankie)"	3:01
7.	"잡음 (Noise)"	3:44
8.	"Coffee (featuring 성아)"	4:11
9.	"Over"	3:44
10.	"숲 (Forest)"	1:39
Total length:		30:45
