= E (Epik High album) =

[e]

Studio album by Epik High
- Released: September 16, 2009
- Genre: Hip hop; K-pop; acoustic; trot
- Length: 130:23
- Language: Korean, English
- Label: Map the Soul Inc. Mnet Media
- Producer: Epik High

Epik High chronology
Map the Soul (2009)	[e] (2009)	Epilogue (2010)

Professional ratings
Review scores
Source	Rating
IZM	4.5/5 stars

[e] is the sixth official album released in September 2009 and the third major album release of that year by Korean hip-hop group Epik High. The two other albums released in 2009 are Map the Soul and Remixing the Human Soul, an electronica-inspired remix compilation album with labelmates Planet Shiver. Like Map the Soul before it, [e] includes a complimentary mini-book along with the actual audio CDs. The 74 page mini-book contains song lyrics, interviews, photographs, and various production notes from the artists themselves.

[e] contains two discs of Hip hop musical experimentation in various genres. Genres experimented include electro-hop, dance-pop, classical music, acoustic rock, and traditional Korean trot music. The album's themes are divided separately into two discs. Disc 1, entitled [e]motion, contains tracks dealing with personal themes and is relatively less mainstream friendly compared to the second disc. Disc 2, conversely entitled [e]nergy, contains radio-friendly tracks, such as the lead single "따라해(Wannabe)(ft. Mellow)."

Notable guest artists on this release include frequent collaborator and Map the Soul labelmate MYK, Korean American emcee Kero One, battle rapper Dumbfoundead, Rakka (from Dilated Peoples), underground rap prodigy Dok2, and electronica group Planet Shiver.

== Track listing ==
=== DISC 1 : [e]motion ===
No.	Title	Writer(s)	Length
1.	"Oceans. Sand. Trees"	Tablo	2:11
2.	"Slow Motion"	Tablo, Mithra Jin	4:55
3.	"선물 (Gift)" (featuring 박지윤)	DJ Tukutz, Tablo, Mithra Jin, Planet Shiver	3:45
4.	"No More Christmas"	Tablo, Mithra Jin	4:12
5.	"Maze" (featuring Dumbfoundead, MYK)	DJ Tukutz, Tablo, MYK, Dumbfoundead	4:31
6.	"통기타 (Acoustic Guitar) (Skit)"	DJ Tukutz, Tablo, Mithra Jin	2:10
7.	"트로트 (Trot)"	DJ Tukutz, Tablo, Mithra Jin	4:46
8.	"Emologue"	Tablo	1:03
9.	"Excuses" (featuring MYK)	Tablo, MYK	4:00
10.	"Moonwalker"	DJ Tukutz, Tablo, Mithra Jin	4:27
11.	"Breathe" (featuring 한희정)	Tablo, Mithra Jin	4:58
12.	"Happy Birthday to Me" (featuring 하동균)	Tablo, Mithra Jin	3:43
13.	"Heaven" (featuring MYK)	Mithra Jin, MYK, Tablo	3:29
14.	"Owls. Shadows. Tears."	DJ Tukutz	1:25
15.	"[BONUS] Slow [e] Motion (Planet Shiver remix)"		5:17
Total length:			54:52

=== DISC 2 : [e]nergy ===
No.	Title	Writer(s)	Length
1.	"Orchestras. Spotlights. Turntables." (featuring MYK)	Tablo, MYK	1:43
2.	"Still Here" (featuring Dok2)	Dok2, Tablo, Mithra	3:55
3.	"Sensitive Thug (Skit)"	DJ Tukutz, Tablo, Mithra Jin	2:00
4.	"따라해 (Wannabe)" (featuring Mellow)	Tablo, Mithra Jin, Planet Shiver	3:20
5.	"Rocksteady" (featuring Kero One, Dumbfoundead, MYK, Rakaa of Dilated Peoples)	DJ Tukutz, Tablo, Mithra Jin, Kero One, Dumbfoundead, MYK, Rakaa	4:46
6.	"Madonna" (featuring Mellow)	Planet Shiver, Tablo, Mithra	4:11
7.	"말로맨 (Malloman)"	Tablo, Mithra	3:58
8.	"Shopaholic"	Tablo, Mithra	3:51
9.	"Supreme 100"	Tablo	4:56
10.	"High Technology"	Tukutz, Tablo, Mithra, Planet Shiver	3:30
11.	"Rocksteady (Korean Version)" (featuring Paloalto, Dok2, Beatbox DG, Beenzino)	DJ Tukutz, Tablo, Mithra, Paloalto, Dok2, Beatbox DG, Beenzino	4:47
12.	"High Skool Dropout (반항하지 마)"	Tablo, Yankie, Planet Shiver, Mithra	3:28
13.	"흉(Whitetip)" (featuring MYK, YDG, Dok2)	MYK, Tablo, Mithra, YDG, Dok2	4:24
14.	"Lesson 4"	Tablo	4:18
15.	"Organs. Screams. Televisions."	DJ Tukutz	1:22
Total length:			48:49
