= We've Done Something Wonderful =

Studio album by Epik High
- Released: October 23, 2017
- Recorded: 2017
- Genre: Hip hop; alternative hip hop
- Length: 43:35
- Label: YG Entertainment

Epik High chronology
Show Must Go On & On (2016)	We've Done Something Wonderful (2017)	Sleepless in (2019)

Singles from We've Done Something Wonderful
- 1. "Home Is Far Away" Released: October 23, 2017; 2. "Love [Story]" Released: October 27, 2017

We've Done Something Wonderful (stylized in all caps) is the ninth studio album by the hip hop group Epik High. The album was released on October 23, 2017, by YG Entertainment. It would be their final release under YG before their departure from the label on October 2, 2018. "Home Is Far Away" featuring Oh Hyuk and "Love [Story]" featuring IU served as singles from the album.

== Background and release ==
On September 27, 2017, Epik High released a video, confirming their ninth album's title and release date. The video also revealed that South Korean singer, IU, would feature on the album. On October 12, a poster was revealed containing lyrics from one of the album's songs. The full album was released on October 23, 2017, with its first single, "Home Is Far Away" (featuring hyukoh's Oh Hyuk. The album's second single, "Love [Story]" (featuring IU) was released on October 27.

== Reception ==
We've Done Something Wonderful peaked at No. 6 on the South Korean Gaon chart, and No. 2 on the US World Albums chart. Billboard gave the album a positive review, stating "Wonderful is a testament to the trio's place in the Korean music industry, with the band adapting and drawing on popular sounds while maintaining their unique identity as an act that weighs its music with introspective lyrics. Contemplatively inspirational and dreary, it is a mature album that -- while perhaps less fun and pop-ish than Shoebox -- seems to return Epik to a more introverted space, inspired by what they've faced over their nearly decade and a half as one of Korea's most prominent hip-hop teams."

== Tracklist ==
Credits adapted from Melon.

No.	Title	Lyrics	Music	Arrangement	Length
1.	"People Scare Me" (난 사람이 제일 무서워 (Note: Nan sarami jeil museowo lit. "I'm afraid of people the most"))	Tablo; Mithra Jin; Roger Anfinsen; Lee Hutson Sr; Joseph Scott	DJ Tukutz; Chancellor; DOCSKIM; Roger Anfinsen; Lee Hutson Sr; Joseph Scott	DJ Tukutz; Chancellor; DOCSKIM; Roger Anfinsen; Lee Hutson Sr; Joseph Scott	3:08
2.	"Love [Story]" (연애소설; (Note: Yeonaesoseol lit. "Love novel") featuring IU)	Tablo; Mithra Jin	DJ Tukutz; Tablo	DJ Tukutz; Tablo	3:56
3.	"No Thanxxx" (노땡큐; (Note: No-ttaengkyu lit. "No thank you") featuring Mino, Simon Dominic & The Quiett)	Tablo; Mithra Jin; Simon Dominic; Mino; The Quiett	DJ Tukutz; Tablo; The Quiett	DJ Tukutz; Tablo; The Quiett	4:37
4.	"Home Is Far Away" (빈차; (Note: Bincha lit. "Empty car") featuring Oh Hyuk)	Tablo; Mithra Jin	Tablo	DJ Tukutz; Tablo	4:51
5.	"Here Come the Regrets" (featuring Lee Hi)	Tablo; Anne Judith Wik; Ronny Svendsen; Jin Choi; Ilsey Juber; Lee Hi	DJ Tukutz; Tablo; Anne Judith Wik; Ronny Svendsen; Jin Choi; Ilsey Juber; Lee Hi	DJ Tukutz; Ronny Svendsen	4:27
6.	"The Benefits of Heartbreak" (상실의 순기능; (Note: Sangshir-e Sungineung lit. "The proper function of loss") featuring Lee Su-hyun)	Tablo; Mithra Jin	Tablo	Tablo	3:20
7.	"Bleed"	Tablo; Mithra Jin	DJ Tukutz, Tablo	DJ Tukutz, Tablo	3:40
8.	"Tape 2002/7/28" (TAPE 2002年 7月 28日 (Note: Teipeu icheon-i-nyeon chir-wol isip-par-il lit. "Tape July 28, 2002"))	Tablo; Mithra Jin; DJ Tukutz	Tablo; Mithra Jin; DJ Tukutz; J-Win	Tablo; Mithra Jin; DJ Tukutz; J-Win	1:45
9.	"Us Against the World" (어른 즈음에 (Note: Eoreun jeueum-e lit. "At the adult time"))	Tablo; Mithra Jin	DJ Tukutz; Tablo	DJ Tukutz	4:01
10.	"Lost One" (개화 (開花); (Note: Gaehwa lit. "Blooming") featuring Kim Jong-wan)	Tablo	Tablo; DOCSKIM; Chancellor	Tablo; DOCSKIM; Chancellor	5:02
11.	"Munbae-dong" (문배동 단골집; (Note: Munbae-dong dangoljip lit. "Favorite hang-out at Munbae-dong") featuring Crush)	Tablo; Mithra Jin	DJ Tukutz; Tablo; SHAUN (THE KOXX)	DJ Tukutz; SHAUN (THE KOXX)	4:43
Total length:					43:36

Japan Edition bonus track
No.	Title	Lyrics	Music	Arrangement	Length
12.	"Love Story" (featuring Lee Su-hyun; Japanese version)	Tablo; Mithra Jin	DJ Tukutz; Tablo	DJ Tukutz; Tablo	3:55
13.	"Home Is Far Away" (featuring Oh Hyuk; Japanese version)	Tablo; Mithra Jin	Tablo	DJ Tukutz; Tablo	4:51
Total length:					52:22

Japan Edition (DVD)
No.	Title	Length
1.	"Home Is Far Away (feat. Oh Hyuk) + Love Story (feat. IU) MV"
2.	"Love Story (feat. IU) from Live @ WDSW Concert"
3.	"Here Come the Regrets feat. Lee Hi from Live @ WDSW Concert"

== Charts ==
Chart (2019)	Peak position
South Korean Albums (Gaon)	6
US World Albums (Billboard)	2
