= Epik High =

South Korean hip-hop group

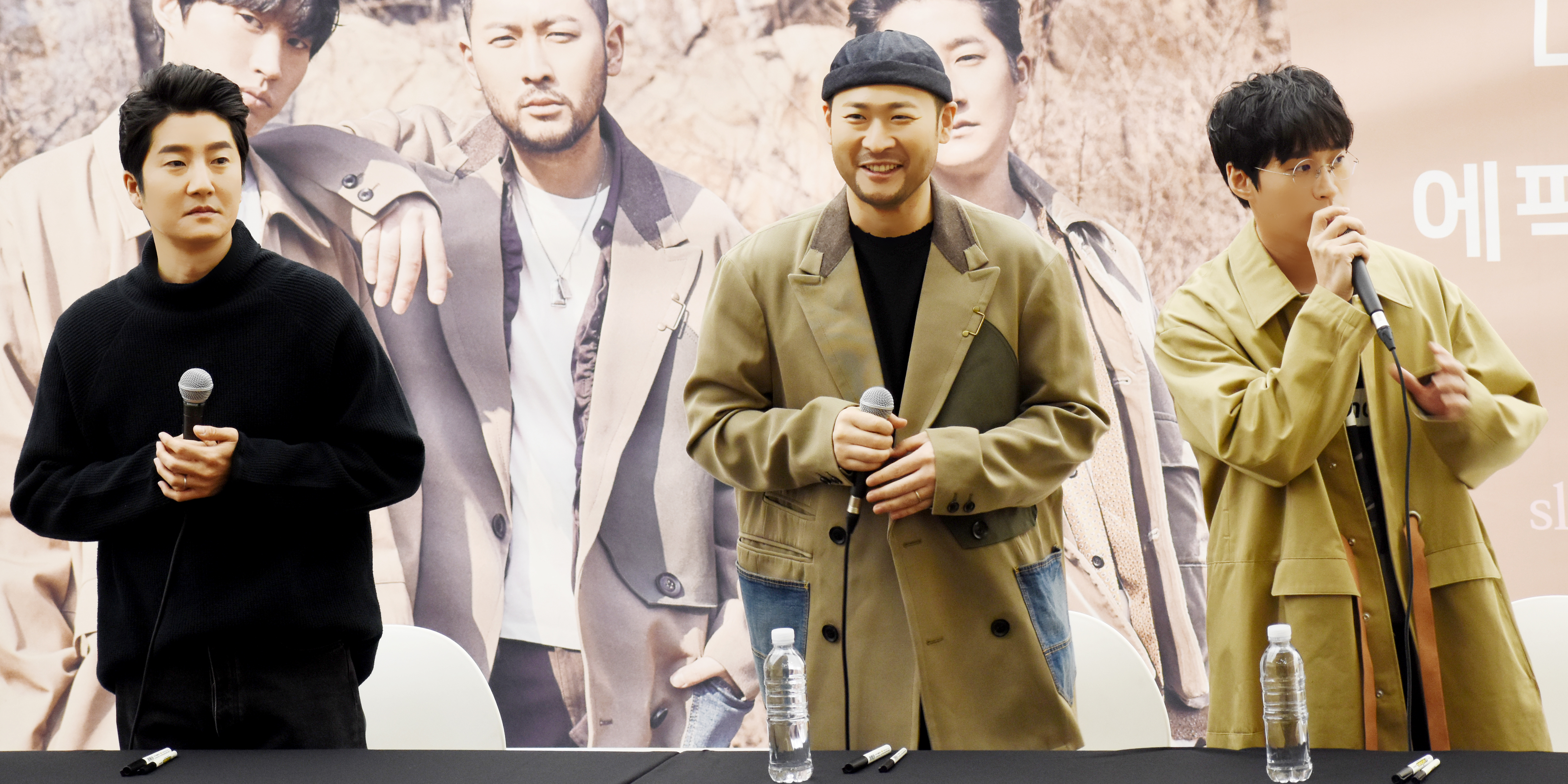
- Epik High in 2019; From left: DJ Tukutz, Mithra Jin, Tablo

Background information
- Origin: Seoul, South Korea
- Genres: Hip-hop; alternative hip-hop; K-pop
- Years active: 2002–present
- Labels: Ours Co.; Woollim; Map The Soul; YG
- Members: Tablo; Mithra Jin; DJ Tukutz
- Website: epikhigh.com

Epik High (Korean: 에픽하이) is a South Korean hip-hop trio formed in 2002, composed of rapper, record producer, and songwriter Tablo, rapper and lyricist Mithra Jin, and DJ and beatmaker DJ Tukutz. Based in Korea, the trio first met in 2002 before signing with Woollim Entertainment and released their first two studio albums, Map of the Human Soul (2003) and High Society (2004). The trio rose to fame with the release of their follow-up studio albums, Swan Songs (2005), Remapping the Human Soul (2007), and Pieces, Part One (2008), spawning the hit singles "Fly", "Paris", "Fan", "Love Love Love", "One" and "Umbrella" (of which Tukutz played no part in). Although the majority of these albums were censored by the Ministry of Culture and Tourism due to strong language and themes of crimes, war, religion, and education, Epik High established themselves as one of the leading hip-hop artists in the country, gaining a cult following and critical acclaim.

Following the completion of Mithra Jin and DJ Tukutz's mandatory military service and the end of their exclusive contract with Woollim Entertainment, Epik High signed with YG Entertainment in 2012. The trio's next studio albums, 99 (2012), Shoebox (2014), and We've Done Something Wonderful (2017), explored heartbreaks, personal struggles, and self-help. Supported by the successful singles "It's Cold", "Up", "Born Hater", "Spoiler", "Happen Ending", "Love Story" and "Home Is Far Away", Epik High garnered international recognition, becoming the first South Korean act to play at Coachella.

Epik High left YG Entertainment in 2018, after which they started their own in-house label, Ours Co., and signed with William Morris Endeavor. They released their second extended play Sleepless in __________ in 2019, followed by a two-part tenth studio album, Epik High Is Here (2021 & 2022). They released their third EP Strawberry, followed by the fourth EP "Screen Time", featuring Hoshi of Seventeen in 2023, and their first official mixtape, "Pump", in 2024.

== History ==
=== 2002–2005: Career beginnings and breakthrough ===
Epik High was formed in 2002 upon frontman Tablo's return to South Korea after graduating from Stanford University. Having previously met rapper Mithra Jin during a trip back to Seoul while still in college, the duo began performing together in the local underground hip-hop scene with the Movement crew, one of the most prominent Korean hip-hop crews of the time that included the likes of Uptown, CB Mass, Leessang and Drunken Tiger. Initially they intended to debut as a duo but decided to add a DJ for their live performances, in the same vein as Dilated Peoples. In March, DJ Tukutz, a turntablist-disc jockey who occasionally played with CB Mass, joined the group.

The trio's first performance together was to a small audience at the amusement park Everland in 2002. Preparations for their first album were delayed due to them and their producer being defrauded and the lack of financial backing from a major label, forcing the members to work part-time jobs to raise the necessary funds. They signed with newly established Woollim Entertainment and released their debut album, Map of the Human Soul, in 2003. This was followed by a second album, High Society in 2004. As the genre was unpopular among mainstream audiences, the releases were met with a lukewarm response from the public, with critics seeing little market for "lyrically complex music" that starkly contrasted the popular trends of the era which favored songs with simple lyrics or was choreography-focused.

Swan Songs was intended to be Epik High's final album, following the poor commercial performance of their previous two releases; however, it became a mainstream hit and made them one of the most popular hip-hop groups in Korea. The album was a chart success with the title track, "Fly," reaching number one on domestic charts. "Fly" also featured on the soundtracks for FIFA 07 and Pump It Up. Another of the album tracks, "Paris" featuring Loveholics' Jisun, was also a hit in Japan and Korea. The album was repackaged the following year as Black Swan Songs, which included remixes of several tracks.

=== 2006–2009: Continued success ===
Originally set for release in October 2006, Epik High's fourth album Remapping the Human Soul was released on January 23, 2007. The two upbeat lead singles, "Fan" and "Love Love Love," were hits, while the rest of the album had darker undertones and tackled diverse themes including sex crimes, war, religion, and education. The Ministry of Culture and Tourism reportedly censored the album due to its lyrical and thematic content. Despite this, it was a commercial success in both Korea and Japan. It went on to sell 120,301 copies during the year, making it the third best-selling album of 2007 in South Korea. During this time, the group spoke of their "no genre, just music" philosophy, expressing frustration with "outdated and isolated" perceptions of the hip-hop genre and the backlash they received from "narrow-minded" traditionalist factions of the domestic hip-hop community.

Over 50,000 copies of their fifth studio album entitled Pieces, Part One was pre-ordered before its release in April 2008. The album's release was followed by music videos for the singles "One," "Breakdown," and "Umbrella." After the album's success, Epik High released the EP Lovescream to acclaim in October, with the EP's title track "1 Minute 1 Second" topping online music charts. In early 2009, Epik High parted ways with Woollim Entertainment and founded their own independent label, Map The Soul, which also managed MYK, Planet Shiver, and Dok2. They released their seventh work, a "book album" entitled 魂: Map the Soul, on March 27 and distributed it exclusively on Epik High's website. Tablo stated that 魂: Map the Soul is not the group's official sixth album but a particular project.

Music videos for the single "Map the Soul" were released on May 19, with worldwide and Korean versions. To commemorate their first release under the independent label, Epik High toured in Japan and performed at Melon Ax in Seoul with Kero One and MYK. That month, they also served in various cities in the US (New York City, Los Angeles, San Francisco, and Seattle) along with Dumbfoundead, Kero One, MYK, and Far East Movement. On July 22, Epik High and Map the Soul signed with electronic group Planet Shiver and released the remix album Remixing The Human Soul.

Epik High's sixth album, [e], was released on September 16 with the title single "Wannabe" (따라해) featuring Mellow, an electronic pop track critiquing K-pop trends. The studio album contained 30 tracks in a 2-CD format. Its release was followed by a concert at the Olympic Hall. However, promotional activities and plans for a tour were canceled when DJ Tukutz's enlistment date was unexpectedly pushed forward. He enlisted for mandatory military service on October 15, two days after his marriage.

=== 2010–2012: Epilogue, military service, and hiatus ===
Following DJ Tukutz's enlistment, Tablo and Mithra Jin continued as a duo, with guest DJs joining them for live performances. They performed at Midem 2010 in Cannes on January 26, 2010. Epik High's seventh studio album, Epilogue, was released under Woollim Entertainment on March 9, 2010, to chart success. The music video for its title track, "Run," featured several Woollim trainees who eventually debuted as members of boyband Infinite several months later: L as the video's protagonist, Sunggyu as a guitarist, Woohyun as bassist, and Sungjong as keyboardist. In addition, Hoya and Dongwoo also served as backup dancers during promotions of the single on various music shows.

Shortly after promotions for Epilogue ended, Mithra Jin enlisted on August 3. Tablo, being a Canadian citizen, did not need to enlist. During the two-year hiatus that followed Mithra Jin's enlistment, DJ Tukutz was discharged in August 2011 while Tablo signed with YG Entertainment and released a solo album titled Fever's End on November 1, 2011. Tablo refuted rumors of Epik High disbanding and stated that both members were aware of his decision.

Mithra Jin was discharged from the military on May 14, 2012. In July, it was confirmed that he and DJ Tukutz would be signing with YG Entertainment and that Epik High would be making a comeback as a trio after three years. On October 9, the group released the single "It's Cold" featuring the newly signed Lee Hi, to chart success. They digitally released the album 99, as well as music videos for the tracks "Up" (featuring Park Bom) and "Don't Hate Me," on October 19. The album was physically released on October 23 with two extra tracks, not on the digital release. During the SBS Gayo Daejeon on December 30 they joined Dynamic Duo and Simon D in performing "Cypher 2012", a remix of K-pop and hip-hop hits of the past year; the arrangement and performance was praised by viewers and critics as one of the highlights of the year-end special music performances.

=== 2013–2017: 10th anniversary and worldwide recognition ===
On October 23, 2013, Epik High released the digital single "420" featuring Double K, Yankie, Dok2, Sean2Slow, Dumbfoundead, TopBob, and MYK to celebrate their tenth anniversary. On May 18, 2014, they released the single "With You" in collaboration with Chinese singer Bibi Zhou, as a re-recording of "Fool" (originally featuring Bumkey) from their previous album Epilogue. On October 18, YG Entertainment released the music video for the pre-release track "Born Hater" featuring a line-up of noted rappers. Epik High's eighth studio album, Shoebox, was physically released on October 22 and met with critical praise for the emotion and complex lyrical content of lead singles "Happen Ending" and "Spoiler" as well as other tracks including "Burj Khalifa" and "Amor Fati."

In 2015 Epik High gained further recognition abroad with well-received performances at the K-Pop Night Out at SXSW in the U.S. and the Summer Sonic Festival in Japan. In April 2016, they became the first-ever mainstream South Korean act to perform at the Coachella music festival, where their performance was well received by audiences. On October 23, 2017, they released We've Done Something Wonderful, their ninth studio album.

=== 2018–present: Departure from YG and new releases ===
On October 3, 2018, Epik High left YG Entertainment after their contract expired and set up their own agency, naming it "Ours Co". On February 19, 2019, Epik High signed to William Morris Endeavor to manage their overseas promotions. Epik High released their second EP, Sleepless in __________, on March 11. The EP peaked at number 8 on the Gaon Album Chart and number 6 on the Billboard US World Album Chart. On October 22, 2020, the band posted a new video announcing their tenth album for January 2021. On December 28, 2020, Tablo announced that the group would release part 1 of their tenth album, Epik High Is Here, on January 18, 2021. The album's first single, "Rosario", featured CL and Zico.

On June 29, 2021, Epik High released the new single "Rain Song," featuring Colde. On October 25, 2021, Epik High released the new single "Face ID," which features Sik-K, Justhis, and Giriboy. The single serves as a pre-release for part two of Epik High Is Here. On January 12, 2022, it was revealed that Epik High would be performing at Coachella 2022, making them the first Korean act to be re-invited to the festival. On February 14, 2022, the group released part 2 of Epik High Is Here. On March 17, 2022, Epik High announced that it would be holding the 2022 'Epik High Is Here Encore' concert for three days from May 11 to 13.

On January 18, 2023, Epik High announced their third EP, Strawberry. It was released on February 1, 2023. For much of the year, they were on their All Time High Tour and played in Europe, North America, Latin America and Asia. They held their sold-out 20th anniversary concerts at the SK Olympic Handball Gymnasium from December 15 to 17. A concert film, which included footage of the performances and backstage and commentary from the members, was made and released in theaters in March 2024. It was also screened at the Busan International Film Festival in October.

On May 30, 2024, it was announced that Epik High would be releasing their first mixtape, Pump, on June 20. They subsequently embarked on a tour in Asia, Australia and North America.

As part of a "song battle" challenge for their YouTube content Epikase, each Epik High member produced and performed their own solo song and the songs were released as an EP on September 4, 2026. DJ Tukutz's solo song was re-released as a new digital single "Epikism" and includes both Tablo and Mithra Jin and their additional lyrics. On September 29, it was announced that they would be holding their Seoul concerts at the KSPO Dome on January 22–24, 2027. On Octobert 13, they released a single "Mise-en-scène" (미장센) with an accompanying music video as part of a collaboration with R&B duo and long-time friends Davichi.

== Artistry ==
=== Lyrical themes ===
The content of Epik High's discography is largely social commentary, often utilizing direct or thinly veiled references to current events or personal experiences. For example, "난 사람이 제일 무서워 (People Scare Me)", the first track from the 2017 album We've Done Something Wonderful, referred to the then-ongoing 2017–2018 North Korea crisis while "K-Drama" from the 2024 mixtape Pump satirized the cliched "happily-ever-after" endings frequently seen in Korean dramas. Other songs such as "FAQ" from the critically acclaimed Remapping the Human Soul and "Born Hater", the lead single of Shoebox, addressed the criticism and hateful online comments written about them by directly quoting the statements. As some of their hits frequently featured strong language or profanity in both English and Korean, the original recordings are banned from variety programs or music programs by terrestrial television networks and only the "clean version" is allowed to be performed.

=== Musical style and influences ===
Because we felt very limited by what the three of us could do because if we stuck to just us three doing it, there would be beats and raps, which is fine, which we love....but at the same time, we also love melodies. We love a lot of instrumentation. We are fans of other genres. I'm actually more of a rock kid than hip-hop. Tukutz loves hip-hop but also loves jazz. He loves K-pop. Mithra pretty much listens to everything. And we wanted this group to channel all of that. [...] Outside of Korea, sometimes we're referred to as a K-pop group and sometimes they make a clear distinction about us being a hip-hop group. You can call us anything. We’ve been called a boy band even. —Tablo

Epik High's hip-hop sound has been described as being rooted in "old school" boom bap and the members have cited Dilated Peoples, Rakim and Nas as influences. However, they have since become known for being more experimental and disregarded the traditional confines of Korean hip-hop by incorporating elements or collaborating with artists from other genres such as R&B, trot, soul and Latin music. They were among the earliest hip-hop acts to collaborate with singers rather than other rappers; having a "featured artist", especially one of a different genre, was uncommon in the Korean music industry before the 2010s. The members themselves expressed on multiple occasions that they disliked being pigeon-holed into a particular category or genre. Dazed noted: "They don't quite fit into pop, but they've evolved beyond a traditional hip hop act too: and they've angered the underground community by daring to meld elements of rock, soul, R&B and pop with their rap verses."

== Public image ==
Once dubbed the "rebels" or "bad boys" of the industry, Epik High became known for their refusal to adhere to certain industry norms and for their outspoken personas that contrasted their clean-cut appearances, particularly in a socially reserved society. Unusual for top-selling veteran artists, they personally run the day-to-day operations of their own agency and oversee nearly all aspects of their careers, from group branding to scheduling performances. They adopted several marketing strategies mainly associated with K-pop singers and idol groups rather than hip-hop artists, such as appearing on television programs and producing a light stick for their fandom. Their light stick was designed in the shape of the finger and named "Park Kyu Bong", a pun of the phrase "fuck you", with various media outlets describing the design and wordplay as befitting of the group's trademark "irreverent", "rebellious spirit". It went viral among K-pop and K-hip-hop communities online and was notably seen at protests following the 2024 martial law crisis.

In light of the fact that they have been frequently "lumped together" with K-pop by the media, Epik High have regularly made tongue-in-cheek references to the misnomer through their ostentatious self-introductions during concerts and starting a content series called Epikase on their YouTube channel, which they dubbed "3.0" and features all three members engaging in various activities together or interviewing other K-pop artists in a casual format. The unscripted nature of Epikase and the members' chemistry led to its popularity and earned their YouTube channel the Gold Play Button by May 2025.

== Impact and legacy ==
Epik High were part of a new wave of hip-hop artists who had started underground before gaining more visibility, following in the footsteps of trailblazer Tiger JK and duos Leessang and Dynamic Duo. Although no longer part of the underground hip-hop scene, they have continued to regularly feature both established and lesser-known hip-hop artists in their albums or inviting them as guests at their concerts.

The first textbook to refer to regarding the survival and establishment of hip-hop groups in Korea....they have moved between the underground hip-hop community (Movement) and major K-pop agencies (YG Entertainment) and have appeared in hip-hop concerts and entertainment programs at the same time, so it is no exaggeration to say that their trajectory is the gravity that holds the center of domestic hip-hop. —Newsis on Epik High's 20th anniversary

Epik High are among the earliest domestic hip-hop acts to achieve mainstream success and recognition, becoming the first act to have a song win first place on a music program with the success of "Fly" from the 2005 album Swan Songs; since then, their songs have won number 1 multiple times on all music programs broadcast by the country's three main television broadcasters (KBS's Music Bank, MBC's Show! Music Core and SBS's Inkigayo) and pop music-centered channel Mnet (M Countdown) and they have performed at major music awards ceremonies such as the MAMA Awards and Golden Disc Awards. In 2010 they became the first Korean artists to top the US iTunes charts in the hip-hop category. Their success on music programs and various charts was considered groundbreaking for a hip-hop act, particularly in a landscape largely dominated by idol groups and pop singers. They were the longest continuously active artist in Spotify's list of the top 5 most streamed Korean hip-hop artists for the year 2022, a testament to their longevity. Music critic and radio writer Bae Soon-tak noted that part of their enduring appeal stemmed from their reputation as consummate live performers and ability to entertain audiences across all demographics, despite having only three members and mostly performing with only DJ Tukutz's live DJing and no backing musicians or dancers. In a 2024 joint survey organized by Gallup Korea and local media outlet Star News, in which 1,052 citizens aged 19 to 69 were asked to rank the top 10 active Korean hip-hop artists (specifically rappers) of the 21st century, Epik High ranked 3rd overall.

Within the domestic music industry, Epik High have garnered critical acclaim for their prolific musical output while maintaining their artistic integrity and are one of the few acts whose members have all been promoted to "full members" of the Korea Music Copyright Association. They have been credited with influencing a new generation of "self-composing" idols, as well as younger hip-hop artists. Despite changing labels several times throughout their career, the trio continued to retain their creative independence, with all three members directly involved in the songwriting process from conception to release. Rappers Tablo and Mithra Jin mainly contribute to the lyrics and composition while DJ Tukutz oversees the musical direction and post production.

== Discography ==
- Map of the Human Soul (2003)
- High Society (2004)
- Swan Songs (2005)
- Remapping the Human Soul (2007)
- Pieces, Part One (2008)
- Map the Soul (2009)
- (e) (2009)
- Epilogue (2010)
- 99 (2012)
- Shoebox (2014)
- We've Done Something Wonderful (2017)
- Epik High Is Here (2021–2022)

== Concert tours ==
- Epik High Map The Soul USA Tour (2009)
- Epik High Concert Parade Asia Tour (2014)
- Epik High Japan Tour The Show Must Go On (2015)
- Epik High North America Tour (2015)
- Epik High Concert Legend 3 In Seoul (2015)
- Epik High Japan Tour (2016)
- Epik High Concert Now Playing (2016)
- Epik High Comeback Concert We've Done Something Wonderful (2017)
- EPIK HIGH 2019 European Tour (2019)
- EPIK HIGH 2019 North American Tour (2019)
- 2019 EPIK HIGH in Singapore
- Epik High Is Here North America & Asia Pacific Tour (2022)
- Epik High All Time High Tour Europe, North America, Latin America & Asia (2023)
- The Pump Tour Asia Pacific & North America (2024)
- Epik High Asia Tour (2025)
- Epik High 3.0 North America Tour (2026)

== Awards and nominations ==
Name of the award ceremony, year presented, award category, nominated work and the result of the nomination
Award	Year	Category	Nominated work/Nominee	Result	Ref.
Cyworld Digital Music Awards	2007	Song of the Month – February	"Fan"	Won	
Cyworld Digital Music Awards	2009	Tam Eum Mania Award – April	"Map The Soul" (featuring MYK)	Won	
Cyworld Digital Music Awards	2012	Song of the Month – October	"It's Cold" (featuring Lee Hi)	Won	
Gaon Chart Music Awards	2014	Discovery of the Year	Epik High	Won	
Gaon Chart Music Awards	2017	Artist of the Year – Digital (October)	"Love Story" (featuring IU)	Won	
Gaon Chart Music Awards	2017	Artist of the Year – Digital (October)	"Home Is Far Away."	Nominated	
Gaon Chart Music Awards	2019	Artist of the Year – Digital (March)	"Lovedrunk" (featuring Crush)	Nominated	
Gaon Chart Music Awards	2021	Artist of the Year – Digital (January)	"Rosario" (featuring CL and Zico)	Nominated	
Gaon Chart Music Awards	2021	Artist of the Year – Digital (June)	"Rain Song" (featuring Colde)	Nominated	
Genie Music Awards	2018	Digital Album of the Year (Daesang)	We've Done Something Wonderful	Nominated	
Genie Music Awards	2018	Song of the Year (Daesang)	"Love Story" (featuring IU)	Nominated	
Genie Music Awards	2018	Best Rap/Hip Hop Award	"Love Story" (featuring IU)	Nominated	
Genie Music Awards	2018	Genie Music Popularity Award	Epik High	Nominated	
Golden Disc Awards	2005	Hip-Hop Award	"Fly"	Won	
Golden Disc Awards	2007	Album Bonsang	Remapping the Human Soul	Won	
Golden Disc Awards	2007		Remapping the Human Soul	Nominated	
Golden Disc Awards	2007	Digital Song Bonsang	"Fan"	Nominated	
Golden Disc Awards	2009	Hip-Hop Award	"Trot" and "Wannabe."	Won	
Golden Disc Awards	2013	Hip-Hop Award	Epik High	Won	
Golden Disc Awards	2015	Hip-Hop Award	"Happen Ending"	Won	
Golden Disc Awards	2015	Digital Song Bonsang	"Happen Ending"	Won	
Golden Disc Awards	2015	Digital Daesang	"Happen Ending"	Nominated	
KBS Music Awards	2005	Singer of the Year (Bonsang)	Epik High	Won	
Korean Music Awards	2004	Best Hip Hop Album	Map of the Human Soul	Nominated	
Korean Music Awards	2005	Best Hip Hop Album	High Society	Nominated	
Korean Music Awards	2006	Best Hip Hop Album	Swan Songs	Nominated	
Korean Music Awards	2006	Best Hip Hop Song	"Fly"	Nominated	
Korean Music Awards	2008	Best Hip Hop Album	Remapping the Human Soul	Won	
Korean Music Awards	2008	Hip Hop Musician of the Year (Netizen Vote)	Epik High	Won	
Korean Music Awards	2009	Best Hip Hop Song	"Umbrella"	Nominated	
Korean Music Awards	2015	Best Hip Hop Song	"Born Hater"	Won	
Melon Music Awards	2005	Song of the Year	"Fly"	Won	
Melon Music Awards	2018	Top 10 Artists	Epik High	Nominated	
Melon Music Awards	2019	Best Rap/Hip Hop Award Award	"Lovedrunk" (featuring Crush)	Won	
Mnet Asian Music Awards	2004	Best Hip-Hop Performance	"Peace Day."	Nominated	
Mnet Asian Music Awards	2005	Best Hip-Hop Performance	"Fly"	Won	
Mnet Asian Music Awards	2007	Album of the Year (Daesang)	Remapping the Human Soul	Won	
Mnet Asian Music Awards	2007	Best Hip Hop Performance	"Fan"	Won	
Mnet Asian Music Awards	2007	Song of the Year (Daesang)	"Fan"	Nominated	
Mnet Asian Music Awards	2007	Best Male Group	"Fan"	Nominated	
Mnet Asian Music Awards	2008	Best Hip Hop Performance	"One" (featuring Ji Sun)	Won	
Mnet Asian Music Awards	2008	Album of the Year (Daesang)	Pieces, Part One	Nominated	
Mnet Asian Music Awards	2008	Song of the Year (Daesang)	"One" (featuring Ji Sun)	Nominated	
Mnet Asian Music Awards	2008	Best Music Video	"One" (featuring Ji Sun)	Nominated	
Mnet Asian Music Awards	2008	Best Male Group	"One" (featuring Ji Sun)	Nominated	
Mnet Asian Music Awards	2009	Best Hip-Hop Performance	"Wannabe" (featuring Mellow)	Nominated	
Mnet Asian Music Awards	2010	Best Rap Performance	"Run"	Nominated	
Mnet Asian Music Awards	2010	Best Music Video	"Run"	Nominated	
Mnet Asian Music Awards	2012	Best Rap Performance	"Up" (featuring Park Bom)	Won	
Mnet Asian Music Awards	2014	Best Rap Performance	"Happen Ending."	Won	
Mnet Asian Music Awards	2019	Best HipHop & Urban Music	"Lovedrunk" (featuring Crush)	Nominated	
SBS Music Awards	2005	Hip Hop Award	Epik High	Won	
Seoul Music Awards	2007	Best Album Award	Remapping the Human Soul	Won	
Seoul Music Awards	2007	Main Prize (Bonsang)	Epik High	Won	
Seoul Music Awards	2012	Main Prize (Bonsang)	Epik High	Won	
Seoul Music Awards	2019	R&B Hiphop Award	Epik High	Nominated	
Seoul Music Awards	2021	Main Prize (Bonsang)	Epik High	Nominated	
Seoul Music Awards	2021	R&B Hiphop Award	Epik High	Nominated	
V Chart Awards	2015	Best Stage Performance	Epik High	Won	
