= Lovescream =

EP by Epik High
- Released: September 30, 2008
- Recorded: 2008
- Genre: Hip Hop; instrumental
- Label: Woolim Entertainment

Epik High chronology
Pieces, Part One (2008)	Lovescream (2008)	Map the Soul (2009)

LoveScream is the first EP by Korean hip hop group Epik High, released on September 30, 2008.

== Track listings ==
1. Butterfly Effect
2. Fallin' (featuring Jo Yejin [조예진] of Lucite Tokki [루싸이트 토끼])
3. Harajuku Days
4. 습관 (Habit) (featuring 하동균 of Wanted)
5. 쉿 (Shh)
6. 1분 1초 (1 Minute, 1 Second) (featuring 타루)
7. 1825 (Paper Cranes)
