= Map the Soul =

魂 : Map the Soul

Studio album by Epik High
- Released: March 27, 2009
- Genre: Hip hop
- Length: 34:17
- Language: Korean, English
- Label: Map the Soul Inc. Mnet Media
- Producer: Epik High

Epik High chronology
Lovescream (2008)	魂 : Map the Soul (2009)	(e) (2009)

Map the Soul (魂) is Epik High's book album which was released on March 27, 2009.

The first single from the album is "Map the Soul (ft. MYK)". The album is Epik High's first venture under their own independent label, Map the Soul Inc.

Many tracks on the album were consciously recorded with the international fans in mind, with collaborations from Asian American artists (also labelmates) Kero One & MYK, as well as lyrics in both English and Korean.

The complimentary book (ordered directly from the official site) contains information detailing the album creation process.

== Track listing ==
From iTunes.

No.	Title	Length
1.	"Believe"	3:38
2.	"Cipher (featuring Beatbox DG)"	1:13
3.	"Map the Soul (featuring MYK)"	3:54
4.	"Customer Service (Skit)"	2:09
5.	"Top Gun"	3:59
6.	"Scenario (피해망상 pt.2) (featuring MYK)"	3:47
7.	"London"	3:02
8.	"Free Music (Tablo and MYK)"	3:39
9.	"Map the Soul (Worldwide version) (featuring MYK, Kero One)"	4:33
10.	"8 by 8, Part2 (bonus Track) (featuring MYK, Minos, Paloalto, The Quiett, Verbal Jint, Kebee, E-Sens & Simon Dominic)"	4:23
Total length:		34:17
