= CB Mass =

South Korean hip hop group

- Also known as: Critical Brain Mass
- Origin: South Korea
- Genres: Korean hip hop
- Years active: 1998–2003
- Label: Daeyoung AV
- Members: Curbin; Choiza; Gaeko

CB Mass (Korean: CB 매스) was a Korean hip hop group composed of members Curbin, Choiza, and Gaeko. They debuted in 2000 with the album Massmediah. The group disbanded in 2003.

== History ==
Choiza and Gaeko originally met in the sixth grade but before forming CB Mass they began an underground hip hop group named Kod along with Sixpoint and ZASON, who joined in 1998. In the same year, Choiza and Gaeko met a fellow rapper Curbin and created CB Mass. The trio were active in the burgeoning underground hip hop scene in Seoul and were part of the Movement crew, one of the most prominent crews of the time which included the likes of pioneer Tiger JK of Drunken Tiger and members of Uptown and Epik High.

The group debuted in 2000 and released Massmediah to moderate success. In total they produced three albums: MassMediah in 2000, Massmatics in 2001, and Massappeal in 2003. Their second album Massmatics was their most popular, with 120,000 copies sold in Korea.

After the release of their third album, CB Mass disbanded later the same year after a heated and public dispute where Curbin was accused of embezzling money from Choiza and Gaeko, as well as Movement crew members Epik High (who had yet to release their debut album) and TBNY in what was later dubbed the "VIP controversy" within the underground hip hop community at that time. At the height of their success however there were continuous rumours that they would break up and their last album added weight to this speculation with just Gaeko and Choiza appearing on most of the songs. In the first song of Dynamic Duo's first album Gaeko raps "He liked standing in front of mirrors than music/ He worshipped cash more than friendship/ What he left with us is only betrayal," in a thinly veiled reference to Curbin. Epik High also referenced the controversy in one of the songs on their second album and how it delayed their debut. After CB Mass broke up, Gaeko and Choiza formed Dynamic Duo while Curbin announced plans to go solo but ultimately left the music industry altogether.

== Collaborations ==
Like many hip hop groups CB Mass collaborated with many other Hip Hop groups and individuals. In the song Jinja (진짜, meaning "real") they use the sample of Cheryl Lynn's disco classic Got to be Real for the instrumental. In this music video it features cameo appearances from members of The Movement, an alliance of Korean rappers, which was founded by Drunken Tiger, CB MASS, Uptown and Thanos. Other contributions on their albums include appearances by 서영은, Zason, 양키, P-Da (Tim), Bobby Kim, Juvie, 신지선, Dope Boyz, 윤미래, 에스더, DJ Wreckz, Mikieyes, Sean2slow, Insane Deegie, Yoon Mirae, Lee Tzsche, 이세진, dj honda, parrish PMD smith, headcrack, Yoo Jin Ah, Lee Ju Han, JK Kim Dong ook, Hey, Sin Ye Won, and Epik High.

CB Mass also featured on the first two songs of Lyn's 2002 album Have You Ever Had a broken Heart?.

== Discography ==
=== Albums ===
Title	Album details	Track list
Massmediah	Released: 6 September 2000; Label: Cream	1. Intro; 2. Final; 3. 나침반; 4. Smoke to Heaven (Skit); 5. 서울 Blues (feat. Seo Yeong Eun); 6. Massmediah (feat. Zason, Yankie, Bobby Kim, Juvie); 7. Running; 8. The Movement 2 (feat. Drunken Tiger); 9. Count On (Skit); 10. Normal Life 2 Da 부르주아; 11. 진짜 (For The Club) (feat. 신지선); 12. 행복하면 됐잖아 (feat. Bobby Kim); 13. 늘 어둠에 맞서 (feat. Dope Boyz); 14. 주(酒); 15. Zoo; 16. 불꽃 (feat. 신지선, Yoon Mi-rae); 17. Survival (feat. Zason, 에스더); 18. 끙끙이의 거리 (Skit); 19. 창가; 20. Outro (To Be Continue...2nd)
Massmatics	Released: 9 October 2001; Label: Cream	1. 행진 (feat. DJ Wreckx); 2. 휘파람; 3. DJ Wreckx Interlude; 4. CB Mass는 내 친구; 5. Movement III (feat. Drunken Tiger, Micki Eyes, Sean2slow, Insane Deegie, Tasha); 6. 흔적 (feat. Lee-Tzsche); 7. 얕잡아 볼 수 없는 이유; 8. 셋부터 넷 (feat. 린); 9. 일어나라; 10. New Joint (feat. DJ Honda, Parrish 'PMD' Smith, Headcrack); 11. Gentleman Interlude; 12. Gentleman Quality (For The Club); 13. Sunshine Seoul (feat. Yankie); 14. Watch Out; 15. Outro
Massappeal	Released: 10 February 2003; Label: Daeyoung AV	1. Intro; 2. 동네 한 바퀴; 3. 서울블루스 Pt.II (Soulcity) (Feat. 웅산); 4. 그 양반 이야기 (feat. 유진아); 5. 휘파람 (Assoto Union Version)(feat. T, 이주한); 6. 오아시스 (feat. JK 김동욱); 7. 노박사 심리클리닉 (feat. Noh Hong-chul); 8. Mr. Liar; 9. 흔적 (Abstract Version); 10. In My Lifetime (feat. Hey); 11. 벗 (feat. Yeahwon Shin); 12. 진짜 (Mo'Funk Version) (feat. Yeahwon Shin); 13. 동네 한 바퀴 (Massmediah Version) (feat. Epik High); 14. Shout Out (Remix) (feat. DJ Tukutz)

== Awards ==
Year	Award-Giving Body	Category	Work	Result
2001	Mnet Asian Music Awards	Best Hip-hop Performance	"Real"	Nominated
