= 99 (Epik High album) =

Studio album by Epik High
- Released: October 19, 2012
- Recorded: 2012
- Genre: Hip hop, K-pop
- Length: 34:17
- Label: YG Entertainment
- Producer: Yang Hyun Suk, Tablo

Epik High chronology
| Epilogue (2010) | 99 (2012) | Shoebox (2014) |

Singles from 99
- 1. "It's Cold" Released: October 9, 2012; 2. "Don't Hate Me" Released: October 19, 2012; 3. "Up" Released: October 19, 2012

99 is the seventh studio album by the South Korean hip hop group Epik High. It was released online on October 19, 2012 and in physical CD format on October 23. The title tracks were "Up", a hip-hop song featuring 2NE1's Park Bom, and "Don't Hate Me". The album also included the previously released collaboration with Lee Hi, "It's Cold". This is Epik High's first release under YG Entertainment.

== Background ==
Epik High named the album '99′ for a number of reasons: their love of the number "9″, the 9 songs in the album (plus one short interlude), and the aim to "embrace the meaning of music" for 99% of people, not the top 1%.

Through a commentary film released on October 22, Epik High went through the album tracks, explaining it's the kind of music that the members grew up to and enjoyed during the 1990s. "The album is like taking a time machine with us and going here and there", explained Tablo. Particularly for their two title tracks, the members said that "Up" is meant to encourage people that the next day will be better. For "Don't Hate Me", the members explained that even if the world hates you, if there is at least one person who loves you, life is worth living.

== Track listing ==
| No. | Title | Lyrics | Music | Arrangement | Length |
|---|---|---|---|---|---|
| 1. | "Up (featuring Park Bom of 2NE1)" | Tablo, Mithra | Tablo, DEE.P | DEE.P | 3:43 |
| 2. | "Don't Hate Me" | Tablo, Mithra | Tablo, Choice37 | Choice37 | 3:43 |
| 3. | "Wrong" (사랑한다면 해선 안될 말) | Tablo, Mithra | Tablo, Choi Pilkang | Choi Pilkang | 3:41 |
| 4. | "It's Cold (featuring Lee Hi)" (춥다) | Tablo, Mithra | Tablo, Choi Pilkang | Choi Pilkang | 4:10 |
| 5. | "You Don't Deserve Her (featuring Gaeko of Dynamic Duo)" (아까워) | Tablo, Mithra | Tablo, DJ Tukutz | DJ Tukutz, Mr.sync | 3:43 |
| 6. | "Get Out The Way" (비켜) | Tablo, Mithra | Tablo, Choice37 | Choice37 | 2:59 |
| 7. | "The Bad Guy" (악당) | Tablo, Mithra | Tablo, DEE.P | DEE.P | 4:12 |
| 8. | "Ghost" (Interlude) | | Choi Pilkang | Choi Pilkang | 0:42 |
| 9. | "Kill This Love" | Tablo, Mithra | Tablo, Choi Pilkang | Choi Pilkang | 3:55 |
| 10. | "New Beautiful" | Tablo, Mithra | Tablo, DEE.P | DEE.P | 3:29 |
| Total length: | | | | | 34:17 |
