= High Society (Epik High album) =

Studio album by Epik High
- Released: July 25, 2004
- Genre: Hip hop
- Language: Korean, English
- Label: Woollim Entertainment; CJ Music
- Producer: Epik High

Epik High chronology
Map of the Human Soul (2003)	High Society (2004)	Swan Songs (2005)

High Society is the second studio album in 2004 by Epik High.

== Track listing ==
1. 신사들의 산책 (Gentleman's Stroll) (Good Morning)
2. High Skool
3. 평화의 날 (Day of Peace)
4. Sunrise Interlude
5. Lesson 2 (Sunset)
6. My Ghetto (featuring Kim Yeon-woo)
7. The Basics (featuring Unknowndjs)
8. 신사들의 절약정신 (Gentleman's Saving Spirit) (Good Afternoon)
9. Lady (High Society)
10. 피해망상 (Paranoia) Pt. 3 (featuring TBNY)
11. 11월1일 (November 1) (featuring Kim Jae Suk of WANTED)
12. 뚜뚜루 (Tuturu)
13. 혼자라도 (Although I'm Alone) (featuring Clazziquai)
14. Daydream (사직서) (Resignation)
15. Open M.I.C. (featuring Eun Ji Won, TBNY, Tweak and Dynamic Duo)
16. 뒷담화 (Gossip)
17. 신사들의 몰락 (Gentleman's Demise) (Good Evening)
18. I Remember (70s Soul Remix) (featuring Asoto Union and Kensie) (Bonus Track)
