= Swan Songs (Epik High album) =

Studio album by Epik High
- Released: October 4, 2005
- Genres: K-pop; hip hop
- Length: 58:04
- Language: Korean
- Labels: Woollim; CJ Music
- Producer: Epik High

Epik High chronology
High Society (2004)	Swan Songs (2005)	Black Swan Songs (2006)

Singles from Swan Songs
- 1. "Fly" Released: October 4, 2005; 2. "Paris" Released: October 4, 2005

Swan Songs is the third studio-album by South Korean hip-hop trio Epik High, released on October 4, 2005. Featuring a variety and mix of hip hop, electronica, rock, and jazz, the album has been praised by music critics and the Korean mainstream public upon its debut. "Fly" and "Paris" were the lead hit singles spawned from the album, with "Fly" featured in the soundtrack of the 2006 video game FIFA 07. Due to the numerous offers to remake "Fly" as well as "Paris", a CD sampler was released in Japan in 2007.

== Background ==
After the Epik High's second album High Society (2004) and their appearances on Tablo's sitcom Nonstop 5 and various entertainment programs, Epik High released Swan Songs on October 4, 2005. The record's concept consists of the theme of "Observation of Fall, Death, and Love", with various musicians such as Clazziquai's Alex Chu, Loveholics's Jiseon, Deux's Lee Hyun-do, Nell's Kim Jong-wan being featured on the album. There were rumors of disbandment after the release of Swan Songs, but later the group members stated that "there is no disbandment."

On February 13, 2006, the repackage of the album, titled Black Swan Songs, was released. It contained one new song "Photo Album" in addition to several remixes and accompaniments.

== Reception ==
Commercially, Swan Songs sold over 80,000 copies within three weeks of its release and over 150,000 copies by 2007 according to Korean news sources. The lead single "Fly" topped various music program charts including on the newly established program Show! Music Core, in addition to topping real-time domestic charts.

The follow-up song "Paris", featuring Jiseon, also topped the charts and led the group to receive the Best Hip-Hop award at the 2005 SBS Gayo Daejeon. At the 3rd Korean Music Awards, Swan Songs and "Fly" were nominated for Best Hip-Hop Album and Best Hip Hop song, respectively. In August 2006, "Fly" was recorded for Electronic Arts Korea's FIFA 07 OST for the first time.

== Accolades ==
Awards and nominations
Year	Organization	Category	Work	Result	Ref.
2006	Korean Music Awards	Best Hip Hop Album	Swan Songs	Nominated	

== Track listing ==
1. Innisfree (Intro)
2. Yesterday (featuring 고영준 of Brown Eyed Soul)
3. Lesson 3 (MC)
4. Fly (featuring Amin. J of Soulciety)
5. Funkdamental (featuring UnknownDJs)
6. 그녀는 몰라 (featuring MYK)
7. Ride (featuring L. Wan)
8. 이별, 만남... 그 중점에서 (featuring Alex of Clazziquai)
9. The Epikurean (Intermission)
10. Paris (featuring Jisun of Loveholics)
11. Let It Rain (featuring 김종완 of Nell)
12. 도시가 눈을 감지 않는 이유 (featuring 이정, Infinite Flow)
13. Follow the Flow (featuring MYK, D-Tox)
14. Swan Song (featuring TBNY)
15. Goodbye (Outro)
16. Bone Us: Elements (featuring DJ Wreckx and MYK)
