= Map of the Human Soul =

Studio album by Epik High
- Released: October 21, 2003
- Genre: Hip hop
- Length: 60:11
- Language: Korean, English
- Label: Woollim Entertainment; CJ Music
- Producer: J-Win, Dynamic Duo

Epik High chronology
Map of the Human Soul (2003)	High Society (2004)

Map of the Human Soul is the debut Korean studio album by Korean hip hop group Epik High.

== Track listing ==
No.	Title	Writer(s)	Producer(s)	Length
1.	"Go"	Tablo, Mithra Jin, Gaeko	Gaeko of Dynamic Duo	4:45
2.	"풍파 (Hardships)" (featuring 한상원)	Tablo, Mithra, J-Win	J-Win	4:04
3.	"I Remember" (featuring kensie)	Tablo, Mithra, Gaeko, J-win	Gaeko	3:40
4.	"하늘에게 물어봐 (Ask the Sky)" (featuring Dynamic Duo)	Tablo, Mithra, Gaeko, J-win, Choiza	Gaeko	4:09
5.	"10년 뒤에 (After 10 Years) (Dear Me)" (featuring Leeds)	Tablo, Mithra, Dynamic Duo, TBNY, J-Win	J-Win	4:23
6.	"Lesson One (Tablo's Word)"	Tablo, Dynamic Duo, J-Win	J-Win	3:01
7.	"그녀가 불쌍해 (I Feel Sorry for Her)" (featuring Lyn)	Tablo, Mithra, Choiza	Choiza	4:07
8.	"Street Lovin'" (featuring Joo Suc)	Tablo, Mithra, Joosuc	Joosuc	3:47
9.	"Love Song" (featuring 박성웅)	Epik High	J-Win	4:45
10.	"고독 恨 사랑 (Solitude Grief Love) (Mithra's Word)"	Mithra	J-Win	2:39
11.	"Free Love"	Tablo, Mithra	J-Win	3:45
12.	"Get High"	Tablo, Mithra, J-Win	J-Win	3:49
13.	"유서 (History)" (featuring TBNY)	Tablo, Mithra, Topbob, Yankie	Yankie of TBNY	4:46
14.	"막을내리며 (At the End) (Dedication)"	Tablo, Mithra	J-Win	4:00
15.	"Watch Ya Self (Hidden Track)" (featuring 디기리, Yankie, Double K)			4:23
Total length:				60:11
