= DJ Tukutz =

South Korean DJ (born 1981)

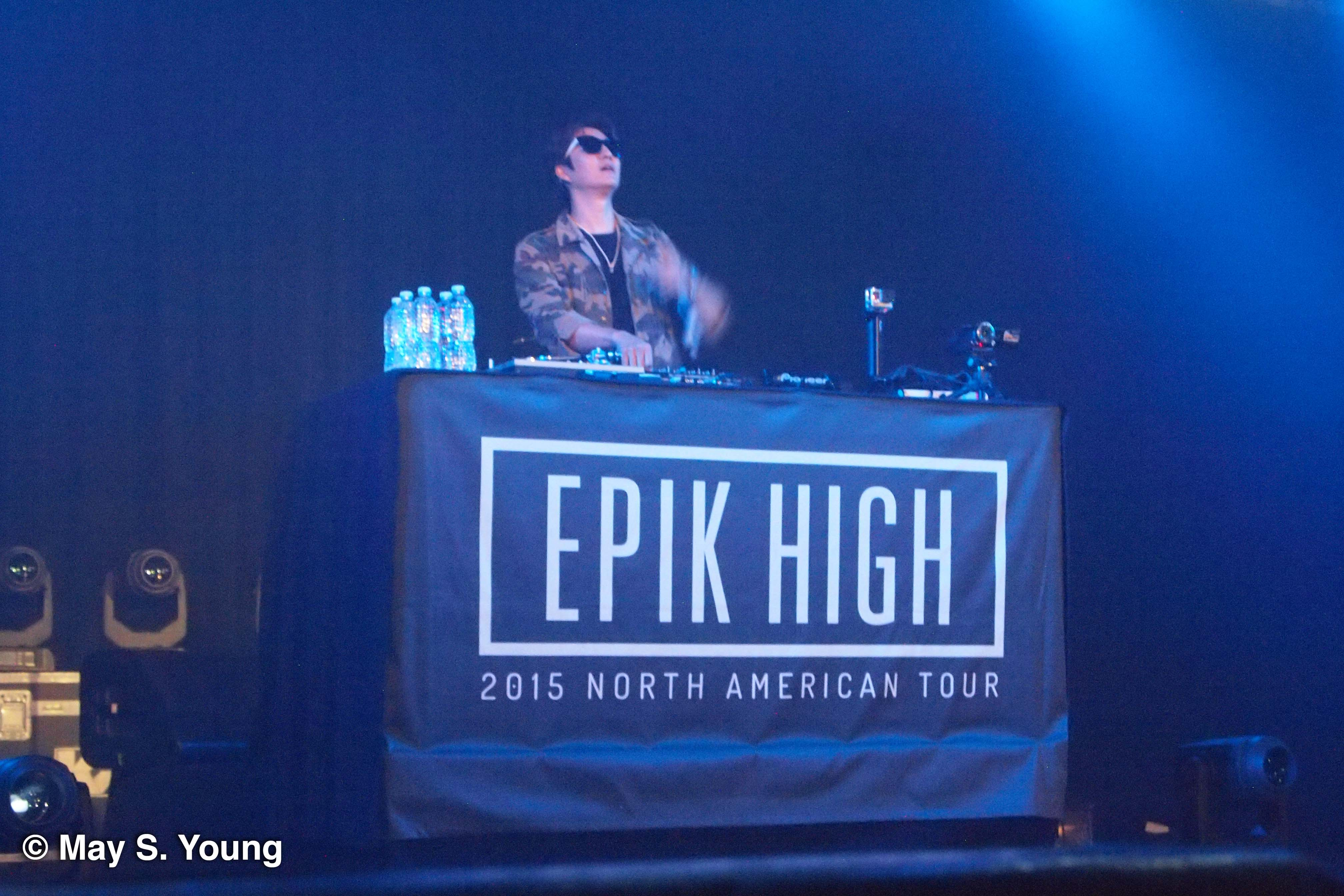
- DJ Tukutz in 2015
- Born: Kim Jeong-sik; 19 November 1981 (age 44); Seoul, South Korea
- Spouse: Lee Eui-jin (m. 2009)
- Children: 2
- Musical career
- Also known as: Street T, FAKE MC
- Instruments: Turntables; keyboards
- Years active: 2001–present
- Labels: Woolim; Map the Soul; YG; Highgrnd; WME; Ours Co
- Member of: Epik High

Korean name
- Hangul: 김정식
- Hanja: 金正植
- RR: Gim Jeongsik
- MR: Kim Chŏngsik

Kim Jeong-sik (Korean: 김정식; born 19 November 1981), more commonly known by the stage name DJ Tukutz (DJ 투컷), is a South Korean DJ, record producer and composer. He is best known as a member of the hip hop group Epik High.

== Early life ==
DJ Tukutz had no inclination towards the music or entertainment industry until Deux sparked his interest in breakdancing. His involvement in the breakdancing scene in Itaewon led to him being exposed to the likes of the Incredible Bongo Band and Grand Mixer DXT, the latter of which inspired him to try turntabling. He later stated that he had been scouted by SM Entertainment after winning a local dance competition but his mother intentionally blocked their calls as she did not believe her son had any prospects in the entertainment industry. After finishing high school and subsequently dropping out of law school, he worked various part-time jobs in order to purchase his first turntables and was a "bedroom DJ" for several years.

== Career ==
=== Early career ===
DJ Tukutz had been mentored by DJ Wreckx, a hip hop DJ now widely recognized in the industry as a pioneer in introducing turntables and scratching to the local club scene. He was eventually introduced to Tablo and Mithra Jin as he occasionally played for CB Mass, who were members of the prominent underground crew Movement alongside Tablo and Mithra Jin. His first performance with Tablo and Mithra Jin as Epik High was in 2002 and he initially only joined them as a guest DJ. However, CB Mass disbanded in early 2003 due to member Curbin allegedly embezzling money from his own members Gaeko and Choiza and other Movement members and defrauding Tablo, Mithra Jin and DJ Tukutz of their funds to produce their debut album.

=== Epik High ===
Epik High joined Woollim Entertainment and debuted in October 2003 with the album Map of the Human Soul. Promotions for their sixth studio album, released in September 2009, were cut short as DJ Tukutz's enlistment date was unexpectedly pushed forward to October. Tablo and Mithra Jin agreed to continue promoting as a duo, with guest DJs joining their live performances. They released Epilogue in March 2010 and intentionally did not include scratching in the instrumental tracks to symbolize DJ Tukutz's absence. During the hiatus following Mithra Jin's enlistment, DJ Tukutz largely stayed out of the public eye, only featuring in Tablo's solo album Fever's End and DJing at hip hop clubs on special occasions.

In July 2012, after Mithra Jin's own discharge from the army, both of them followed Tablo in signing exclusive contracts with YG Entertainment. The trio opted not to renew when their contracts expired in October 2018. They founded their own agency, Ours Co, and manage both group and individual activities themselves.

Unlike Tablo and Mithra Jin, DJ Tukutz has no rap lines and takes on the role of the main producer overseeing the musical direction of album releases and post-production. The vast majority of his credits in Epik High releases are as a composer or arranger. Initially, he was only meant to serve as the group's DJ during live performances and began taking on the role of both producer and audio engineer from the second album onwards as a "cost-saving measure".

== Personal life ==
=== Marriage and family ===
DJ Tukutz married his non-celebrity girlfriend on October 13, 2009. The couple have two children, a son (born in December 2012) and a daughter (born in March 2016).

=== Military service ===
On October 15, 2009, DJ Tukutz enlisted for mandatory military service at the 306th Replacement Battalion in Uijeongbu, Gyeonggi Province. He was assigned to a reconnaissance unit in the 17th Infantry Division and discharged in August 2011.

== Discography ==
=== As featured artist ===
Title	Year	Peak positions	Sales	Album
Title	Year	KOR	Sales	Album
"Superstar (behind The Scene)" (Dynamic Duo feat. Tiger JK, Sean2Slow, DJ Tukutz)	2004	—	—	Taxi Driver
"Scream" (Kim Dong-wan feat. D. Bace and DJ Tukutz)	2007	—	—	Kim Dong Wan Is
"Hip Hop Style" (힙합 스타일) (Deegie feat. DJ Tukutz, Youngji and Sweet.J Ensemble)	2008	—	—	Insane Deegie 2
"The Source" (출처) (Tablo feat. scratch By DJ Tukutz)	2011	54	KOR: 160,907+	Fever's End: Part 2
"—" denotes releases that did not chart or were not released in that region.

=== Credits ===
DJ Tukutz has 123 songwriting credits registered with the Korea Music Copyright Association (KOMCA). All credits are adapted from KOMCA, unless stated otherwise.

==== Other artists ====
Year	Artist(s)	Song	Album	Lyrics		Music		Arrangement		Notes
Year	Artist(s)	Song	Album	Credited	With	Credited	With	Credited	With	Notes
2003	CB Mass	"Intro"	Massappeal	—N/a	—N/a	Yes	J-Win	Yes	J-Win	Instrumental
2006	Lim Jeong-hee	"Never Know" (feat. Tablo)	Thanks	No	—N/a	Yes	Tablo	Yes	—N/a	
2006	I.F	"N.I.C.E (Nothing Is Cool Enough)"	More Than Music	Yes	—N/a	Yes	—N/a	No	—N/a	
2015	Moon Sua	"Who Am I" (feat. Suhyun of Akdong Musician)	Unpretty Rapstar 2 — FINAL X SEMI FINAL Part.2	No	—N/a	Yes	Tablo	Yes	—N/a	
2016	Lee Hi	"안봐도 비디오" (feat. Bobby of iKon)	Seoulite	No	—N/a	Yes	Deanfluenza and Le'mon	Yes	—N/a	Co-produced album with Tablo and Lee Hi
2026	Changmo	"Memento Mori" (feat. Seori)	Monolith	No	—N/a	No	—N/a	Yes	Changmo	Also drums programmer

==== Theme music ====
Program	Notes
Tablo's Dream Radio (2007–2009, MBC FM4U)	Composer of opening theme
Quiz Master (2009, MBC)	Composer of theme music

== Filmography ==
=== Variety programs ===
Year	Title	Notes
2024	My Name is Super Star Kim Jeongsik	YouTube content (11 episodes)
2025	Hangout with Yoo	"Non-Popular Celebrities Club" segment (Episodes 304, 305, 307–310)

=== Music videos ===
Year	Song	Notes
2026	"I'll Pay" 내가 낼게 (UV feat. Choiza)	Cameo appearance
