= Mithra Jin =

South Korean rapper (born 1983)

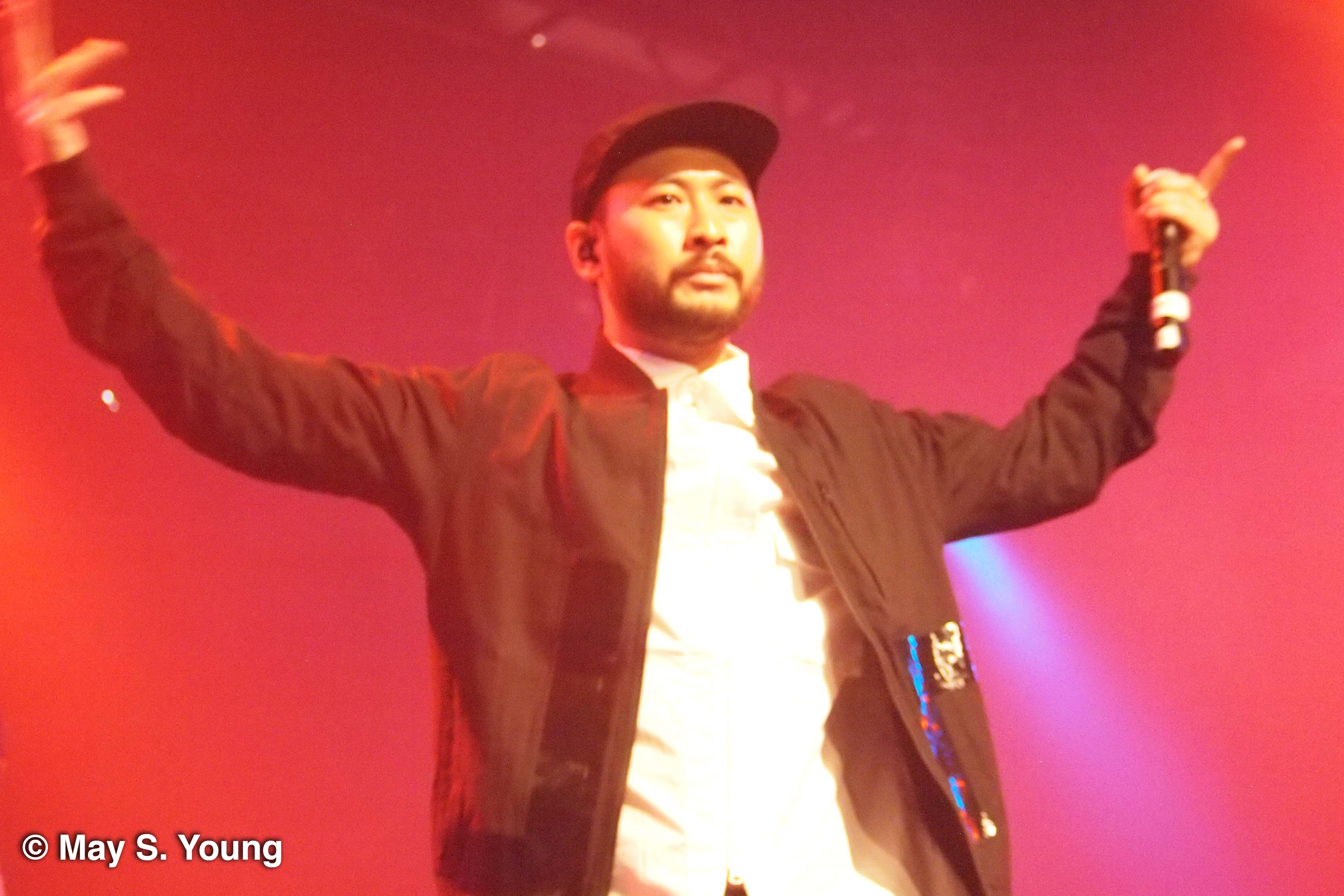
- Mithra Jin on tour with Epik High in 2015
- Born: Choi Jin; 6 January 1983 (age 43); Goheung County, South Jeolla Province, South Korea
- Spouse: Kwon Da-hyun (m. 2015)
- Children: 1
- Musical career
- Also known as: Sleeping M, Mithra眞
- Instruments: Vocals; drums
- Years active: 2001–present
- Labels: Woolim; Map the Soul; YG; Highgrnd; WME; Ours Co
- Member of: Epik High

Korean name
- Hangul: 최진
- Hanja: 崔鎭
- RR: Choe Jin
- MR: Ch'oe Chin

Choi Jin (Korean: 최진; born 6 January 1983), more commonly known by the stage name Mithra Jin (미쓰라 진), is a South Korean rapper and lyricist, best known as a member of the hip hop group Epik High.

== Early life ==
Mithra Jin initially had no inclination towards the music or entertainment industry since his family could not afford additional enrichment courses due to the financial crisis. He started listening to hip hop music in high school and was scouted at a performance by producer J-Win. Having enjoyed writing poetry since childhood, he was drawn to the art of writing lyrics and rapping after J-Win introduced him to Rakim's music.

== Career ==
=== Early career ===
Mithra Jin was part of hip hop crew K-Ryders from 2001 to 2002 with J-Win and Kyungbin. J-Win introduced him to Tablo and they began performing together alongside Movement, the most prominent hip hop crew of that time and included the likes of Drunken Tiger and CB Mass. They met DJ Tukutz, a turntablist-DJ who occasionally played with CB Mass, and eventually formed Epik High. As hip hop was still a mostly underground genre, the trio each worked various part-time jobs to raise the necessary funds to produce an album but were defrauded.

=== Debut with Epik High ===
In 2003, Epik High signed with the newly-founded Woollim Entertainment and released their debut album Map of the Human Soul, with J-Win and CB Mass members Gaeko and Choiza serving as co-producers or composers on the majority of the tracks. In 2010 Mithra Jin was among the featured artists in "Ambassador Slang", one of the tracks from the debut solo album of Rakaa. He co-composed "She's Back", one of the promoted singles from the debut release of Woollim labelmates Infinite.

While Epik High was officially on hiatus due to his and DJ Tukutz's enlistments, Tablo signed with YG Entertainment, sparking rumors of disbandment; it was clarified that Tablo had actually done so with the support of both members. Plans for Epik High's upcoming comeback had begun before Mithra Jin's discharge and they began recording days after he was officially discharged in May 2012.

On 25 July 2012, YG Entertainment officially announced that Epik High be making a comeback after a three-year hiatus and that Mithra Jin and DJ Tukutz would be joining Tablo in signing exclusive contracts with the label. Their comeback album 99 was released on 23 October 2012.

In 2018, Epik High left YG Entertainment after their contract ended. The trio founded their own independent agency, Ours Co, and manage the group and individual activities themselves.

== Personal life ==
=== Military service ===
On 3 August 2010, Mithra Jin enlisted for mandatory military service in Chuncheon. After serving in various roles, his final posting was at the Defense Media Agency (DEMA). He was discharged by the Ministry of National Defense in Yongsan District, Seoul on 14 May 2012.

=== Marriage and family ===
On 22 December 2014, Mithra Jin publicly revealed his relationship with actress Kwon Da-hyun when they attended the VIP screening of How to Steal a Dog, which starred his bandmate Tablo's wife Kang Hye-jung. They married in a private wedding ceremony on 2 October 2015. They have a son (born June 2021).

== Discography ==
Mithra Jin has 230 songwriting credits registered with the Korea Music Copyright Association (KOMCA). All credits are adapted from KOMCA, unless stated otherwise.

=== Featured appearances and collaborations ===
Year	Artist(s)	Song	Album	Lyrics		Music		Arrangement	
Year	Artist(s)	Song	Album	Credited	With	Credited	With	Credited	With
2002	Lyn	"Fly High"	Have You Ever Had Your Heart Broken?	Yes	J-Win	—N/a	—N/a	—N/a	—N/a
2007	Kebee	"Heavenly Break" (Kebee feat. Mithra眞)	Poetree Syndrome	Yes	Keebee	—N/a	—N/a	—N/a	—N/a
2010	Infinite	"She's Back"	First Invasion	Yes	Song Soo-yoon, Han Jae-ho, Kim Seung-soo	—N/a	—N/a	—N/a	—N/a
2010	Infinite	"Wings" 날개	First Invasion	Yes	Tablo	—N/a	—N/a	—N/a	—N/a
2010	Infinite	"Entrust" 맡겨	First Invasion	Yes	Song Soo-yoon, Han Jae-ho, Kim Seung-soo	—N/a	—N/a	—N/a	—N/a

== Filmography ==
=== Television programs ===
Year	Title	Channel	Notes
2018–2019	The Hungry (공복자들)	MBC	Regular cast member (with his wife)
2023	Same Bed, Different Dreams 2: You Are My Destiny (동상이몽2)	SBS	Special cast member (with his wife); 2 episodes

=== Radio programs ===
Year	Title	Station
2016–2018	Mithra's Opening Night (미쓰라의 야간개장)	MBC FM4U
