= Urban Zakapa discography =

South Korean R&B trio

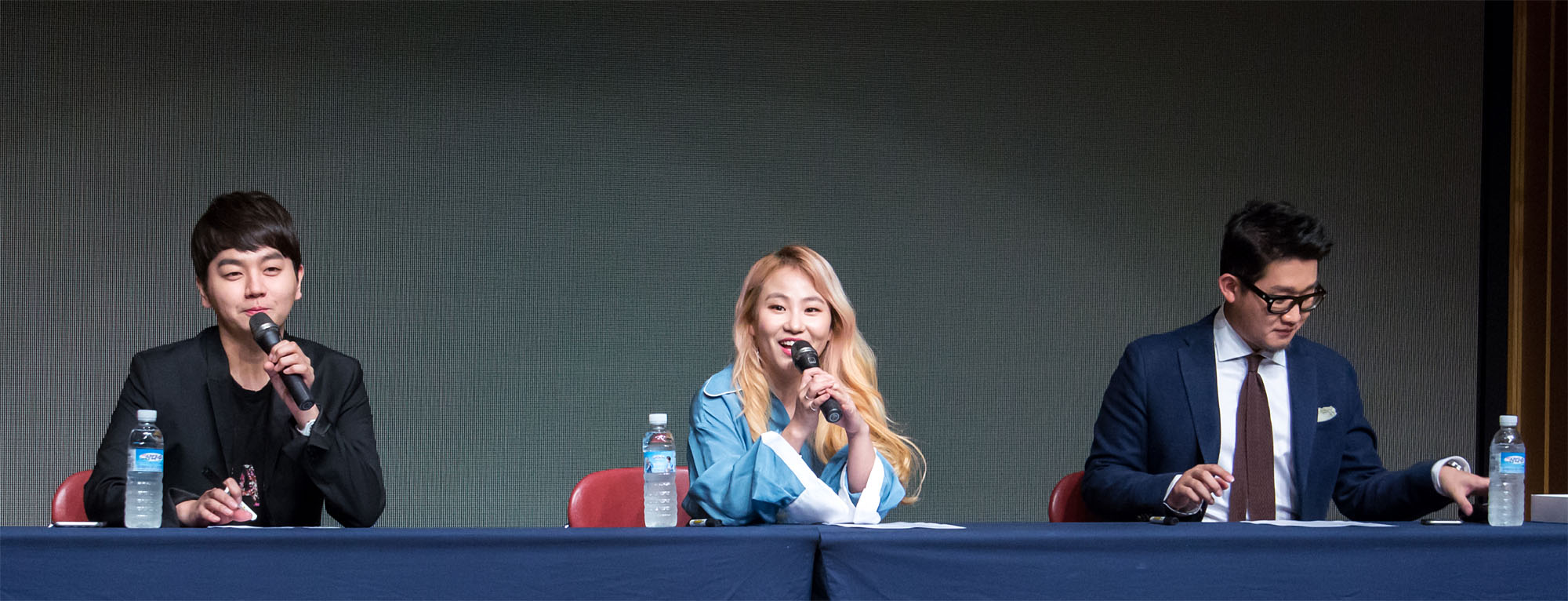
- Urban Zakapa in 2016
- Studio albums: 5
- EPs: 4
- Singles: 23
- Soundtrack appearances: 8

South Korean R&B trio Urban Zakapa have released five studio albums, four extended plays, and seven singles. Originally a nine-member group, Urban Zakapa debuted with the song "Coffee" (커피를 마시고) in 2009.

== Studio albums ==
| Title | Details | Peak chart positions | Sales |
| Title | Details | KOR | Sales |
|---|---|---|---|
| 01 | Released: May 17, 2011; Label: Fluxus Music; Formats: CD, digital download | 73 | KOR: 3,860 |
| 02 | Released: October 30, 2012; Label: Fluxus Music; Formats: CD, digital download | 1 | KOR: 13,402 |
| 03 | Released: December 3, 2013; Label: Fluxus Music; Formats: CD, digital download | 11 | KOR: 4,615 |
| 04 | Released: November 7, 2014; Label: Fluxus Music; Formats: CD, digital download | 8 | KOR: 2,925 |
| 05 | Released: November 27, 2018; Label: Makeus Entertainment; Formats: CD, digital download | 47 | — |

== Extended plays ==
| Title | Details | Peak chart positions | Sales |
| Title | Details | KOR | Sales |
|---|---|---|---|
| Sweety You | Released: December 10, 2009; Label: InPlanet; Formats: CD, digital download | — | — |
| Beautiful Day | Released: April 3, 2012; Label: Fluxus Music; Formats: CD, digital download | — | — |
| UZ | Released: May 28, 2015; Label: Fluxus Music; Formats: CD, digital download | 11 | KOR: 1,264 |
| Still (스틸) | Released: May 27, 2016; Label: Makeus Entertainment; Formats: CD, digital download | 20 | KOR: 1,794 |

== Singles ==
=== As lead artist ===
| Title | Year | Peak chart position | | Sales (Note: Sales figures for tracks are based on digital downloads, except noted.) | Album |
| Title | Year | KOR (Note: The Gaon Music Chart began releasing data in 2010 after the Music Industry Association of Korea stopped compiling data in 2008.) | KOR Hot | Sales | Album |
|---|---|---|---|---|---|
| "Coffee" (커피를 마시고) | 2009 | * | * | — | Non-album single |
| "Sweety You" | 2009 | * | * | — | Sweety You |
| "My Love" (그날에 우리) | 2011 | 36 | * | KOR: 244,888+ | 01 |
| "Just A Feeling" | 2011 | 59 | * | KOR: 147,350+ | Beautiful Day |
| "Snowing" | 2011 | 32 | * | KOR: 339,577+ | Non-album single |
| "Beautiful Day" | 2012 | 41 | * | KOR: 242,403+ | Beautiful Day |
| "I Hate You" (니가 싫어) | 2012 | 9 | * | KOR: 1,114,110+ | 02 |
| "All The Same" (똑같은 사랑 똑같은 이별) | 2012 | 10 | * | KOR: 959,358+ | 02 |
| "Walk Backwards" (거꾸로 걷는다) | 2013 | 8 | * | KOR: 315,215+ | 03 |
| "When Winter Comes" (코끝에 겨울) | 2013 | 7 | * | KOR: 482,822+ | 03 |
| "Blind" (다르다는 것) | 2013 | 36 | * | KOR: 85,193+ | 03 |
| "Like a Bird" | 2014 | 28 | * | KOR: 107,528+ | 04 |
| "Consolation" (위로) | 2014 | 18 | * | KOR: 175,083+ | 04 |
| "Self-Hatred" (미운 나) | 2014 | 34 | * | KOR: 97,910+ | 04 |
| "Get" (featuring Beenzino) | 2015 | 10 | * | KOR: 283,736+ | UZ |
| "2 1 2" (둘 하나 둘) | 2015 | 37 | * | KOR: 124,607+ | UZ |
| "I Don't Love You" (널 사랑하지 않아) | 2016 | 1 | * | KOR: 2,624,176+ | Still |
| "Thursday Night" (목요일 밤) (featuring Beenzino) | 2016 | 2 | * | KOR: 2,500,000+ | 05 |
| "Alone" (혼자) | 2017 | 8 | * | KOR: 302,979+ | 05 |
| "When We Were Two" (그때의 나, 그때의 우리) | 2017 | 1 | 10 | KOR: 636,899+ | 05 |
| "You're the Reason" (이 밤이 특별해진 건) | 2018 | 28 | 33 | N/A (Note: Record chart Gaon stopped releasing detailed data for the download chart starting 2018.) | 05 |
| "As I Wished" (뜻대로) | 2018 | 45 | — | N/A | 05 |
| "Seoul Night" (서울 밤) (featuring Beenzino) | 2019 | 6 | 6 | N/A | Non-album single |
| "I'll Never Know You" (모르겠어) | 2021 | 134 | — | N/A | Parting |
"—" denotes single that did not chart or was not released.

=== As featured artist ===
| Title | Year | Album |
|---|---|---|
| "Fortress" (Far East Movement featuring Urban Zapaka) | 2016 | Identity |

=== Promotional singles ===
| Title | Year | Peak chart position | Sales | Album |
| Title | Year | KOR | Sales | Album |
|---|---|---|---|---|
| "Moai" (Note: Originally recorded by Seo Taiji in 2008, the song was cover by Urban Zakapa as part of Seo Taiji's 25th Anniversary Remake Project "Time: Traveler") | 2017 | 50 | KOR: 34,675+ | Non-album single |
| "One Happy Day" (기분 좋은 날) (Note: Originally recorded by Kim Wan-sun in 1989, the song was covered by Urban Zakapa as part of Yoon Jong-shin's "Hello 30" project.) | 2019 | — | — | Monthly Project 2019 June |
"—" denotes single that did not chart or was not released.

=== Collaborations ===
| Title | Year | Peak chart position | Sales | Album |
| Title | Year | KOR | Sales | Album |
|---|---|---|---|---|
| "The Space Between" (틈) (Kwon Sun-il and Park Yong-in with Soyou) | 2014 | 2 | KOR : 855,196+ | Non-album single |
| "In Your House" (니네집에서) (with Yoo Se-yoon featuring My Friend's Home) | 2015 | — | — | Monthly Rent Yoo Se-yoon: The Second Story |
| "Reminisces of a 10-year-old Journal" (10년 전의 일기를 꺼내어) (with Ecobridge) | 2018 | — | — | The Way You Keep Friendship : SSaW Tribute, Vol. 5 |
"—" denotes single that did not chart or was not released.

== Other charted songs ==
| Title | Year | Peak chart position | Sales | Album |
| Title | Year | KOR | Sales | Album |
|---|---|---|---|---|
| "I Still Believe" (내게 다시) | 2012 | 58 | KOR: 146,865+ | "I Hate You" and 02 |
| "River" | 2012 | 26 | KOR: 484,253+ | 02 |
| "Coincidence" (재회) | 2012 | 51 | KOR: 83,621+ | 02 |
| "Breeze" | 2012 | 73 | KOR: 68,048+ | 02 |
| "No Love" | 2012 | 87 | KOR: 58,539+ | 02 |
| "Back In The Day" | 2012 | 93 | KOR: 54,886+ | 02 |
| "Emptiness" (허무하다) | 2012 | 95 | KOR: 54,349+ | 02 |
| "Home" (문) | 2012 | — (Note: "Home" did not enter the Gaon Digital Chart, but debuted and peaked at number 86 on the Gaon Download Chart.) | KOR: 47,233+ | 02 |
| "Fly" (날아가다) | 2012 | — (Note: "Fly" did not enter the Gaon Digital Chart, but debuted and peaked at number 89 on the Gaon Download Chart.) | KOR: 46,366+ | 02 |
| "June 14th" (6월 14일) | 2012 | — (Note: "June 14th" did not enter the Gaon Digital Chart, but debuted and peaked at number 96 on the Gaon Download Chart.) | KOR: 43,614+ | 02 |
| "One Day" (어떤 하루) | 2013 | 42 | KOR: 108,516+ | 03 |
| "Tell Me" (말해봐) | 2013 | 55 | KOR: 39,536+ | 03 |
| "Do" | 2013 | 59 | KOR: 36,979+ | 03 |
| "Like Love" | 2013 | 72 | KOR: 32,831+ | 03 |
| "Blue" (우울) | 2013 | 78 | KOR: 31,779+ | 03 |
| "It's Fine" (괜찮아) | 2013 | 84 | KOR: 30,250+ | 03 |
| "I Dance" (춤을 추다) | 2013 | 89 | KOR: 28,531+ | 03 |
| "Dream" (꿈) | 2013 | 96 | KOR: 27,586+ | 03 |
| "Every Single Day" (매일 매일 매일) | 2014 | 86 | KOR: 36,455+ | 04 |
| "The Moment of Parting" (피아노 앞에서) | 2014 | 95 | KOR: 33,609+ | 04 |
| "To Be a Grown Up" (어른이 되는 일) | 2014 | — (Note: "To Be a Grown Up" did not enter the Gaon Digital Chart, but debuted and peaked at number 85 on the Gaon Download Chart.) | KOR: 15,211+ | 04 |
| "Play" | 2014 | — (Note: "Play" did not enter the Gaon Digital Chart, but debuted and peaked at number 96 on the Gaon Download Chart.) | KOR: 14,215+ | 04 |
| "The Way to Let Me Go" (보내는 방법) | 2014 | — (Note: "The Way to Let Me Go" did not enter the Gaon Digital Chart, but debuted and peaked at number 98 on the Gaon Download Chart.) | KOR: 13,967+ | 04 |
| "Ordinary Love" (보통의 연애) | 2015 | — (Note: "Ordinary Love" did not enter the Gaon Digital Chart, but debuted and peaked at number 66 on the Gaon Download Chart.) | KOR: 38,099+ | UZ |
| "Always Wonder" (궁금해) | 2016 | 37 | KOR: 115,907+ | Still |
| "Everything Is Good" (다 좋아) | 2016 | 45 | KOR: 92,485+ | Still |
| "If You Still Love Me" (아직도 나를 사랑한다면) | 2016 | 55 | KOR: 85,499+ | Still |
| "Nearness Is to Love" | 2016 | 72 | KOR: 70,614+ | Still |

== Soundtrack appearances ==
| Title | Year | Peak chart position | | Sales | Album |
| Title | Year | KOR | KOR Hot | Sales | Album |
|---|---|---|---|---|---|
| "Love Afternoon" (사랑오후) (Note: Only features Kwon Sun-il and Park Yong-in.) | 2013 | 44 | * | KOR: 50,798+ | Ad Genius Lee Tae-baek OST |
| "Just a Little Bit" (그냥 조금) | 2013 | 15 | * | KOR: 330,741+ | Nine OST |
| "Yayaya" (야야야) | 2014 | 77 | * | KOR: 37,898+ | Hi! School: Love On OST |
| "A Different You" (또 다른 너) | 2015 | 30 | * | KOR: 105,670 | Let's Eat 2 OST |
| "No Way" | 2016 | 24 | * | KOR: 246,746+ | The Doctors OST |
| "That Kind of Night" (그런 밤) | 2016 | 8 | * | KOR: 284,967+ | Listen to Love OST |
| "Wish" (소원) | 2017 | 2 | * | KOR: 816,149+ | Guardian: The Lonely and Great God OST |
| "Beautiful My Love" (그대 고운 내 사랑) | 2020 | 29 | 12 | N/A | Hospital Playlist OST |
| "Between Us" (거리) | 2021 | 139 | — | N/A | Now, We Are Breaking Up OST |

== Other appearances ==
| Title | Year | Album |
|---|---|---|
| "You Touched My Heart" (넌 감동이었어) | 2019 | You Hee-yeol's Sketchbook 10th Anniversary Project: 12th Voice 'Sketchbook X Urban Zakapa', Vol. 28 |
| "For a While" | 2019 | You Hee-yeol's Sketchbook 10th Anniversary Project: 13th Voice 'Sketchbook X Urban Zakapa', Vol. 29 |
| "This Is Music" (with UV) | 2019 | Yooflash |
