= Que Sera Sera (TV series) =

- Written by: Do Hyun-jung
- Directed by: Kim Yoon-cheol
- Starring: Eric Mun; Jung Yu-mi; Lee Kyu-han; Yoon Ji-hye
- Opening theme: "Wol Gwang (Moonlight)" by W & Whale
- Ending theme: "Night Time" by Alex Chu
- Country of origin: South Korea
- Original language: Korean
- No. of episodes: 17

Production
- Production company: Chorokbaem Media

Original release
- Network: Munhwa Broadcasting Corporation
- Release: March 17 – May 13, 2007

Que Sera Sera (Korean: 케세라 세라) is a 2007 South Korean television series starring Eric Mun, Jung Yu-mi, Lee Kyu-han, and Yoon Ji-hye. It aired on MBC from March 17 to May 13, 2007 on Saturdays and Sundays at 21:40 for 17 episodes. It is a passionate, violent and twisted drama about emotional abuse, the notion that love is a zero-sum game, and that sometimes, you can even buy love.

== Synopsis ==
Kang Tae-joo (Eric Mun) has been working at an event planning company for three years. He is a player with charm and good looks who always dates rich women. One day, he finds a strange girl named Han Eun-soo (Jung Yu-mi) sleeping in front of his door. Although Tae-joo initially despises her, he eventually finds himself falling for Eun-soo. Cha Hye-rin (Yoon Ji-hye) is the daughter of the CEO of a large department store chain. She and her adopted brother Shin Joon-hyuk (Lee Kyu-han) are in love, but at her father's request, Joon-hyuk dumps her. To make her ex jealous, Hye-rin buys herself a new boyfriend, Tae-joo, but during their contract relationship, Hye-rin begins to like him for real. Meanwhile, Eun-soo, an aspiring fashion merchandising director, catches Joon-hyuk's eye and he pursues her. Both relationships are more pragmatic financially for Tae-joo and Eun-soo, but they can't seem to let go of each other. Tae-joo realizes that he can't forget Eun-soo as easily as he has dropped all the other women in his past. He senses that in Eun-soo, he'll find his redemption from bastard to human.

== Cast ==
=== Main characters ===
- Eric Mun as Kang Tae-joo

Tae-joo is a member of the Palace Department Store Planning Team. Selfish, proud and vain, he hates anything that's complicated and despises to think but he has a warm heart. He is good at card games, billiards and poker, where he hardly ever loses. Handsome, well-mannered, and popular with the ladies, he's pretty much perfect, except for the fact that he's poor.

- Jung Yu-mi as Han Eun-soo
  - Kim So-hyun as young Eun-soo

Simple, bold, and optimistic. Too honest to the extent that she may be described as blunt and absurd. She loves her half-sister Ji-soo dearly.

- Lee Kyu-han as Shin Joon-hyuk

Joon-hyuk is rational, a perfectionist, and an introvert. He is the successor of the Palace Department Store, and moves in elite circles. Though on the outside he has everything, deep inside, he has an inferiority complex about his roots and feels isolated.

- Yoon Ji-hye as Cha Hye-rin

Free, liberal, and genuine, Hye-rin is a successful designer with her own brand. Like other offspring of the rich and famous, she is put under the spotlight for establishing her own business. But she's well aware of the fact that her family background has worked to her advantage. She seems cold and arrogant but deep down, she has a strong desire for true love.

=== Supporting characters ===
- Lee Eun-sung as Han Ji-soo (Eun-soo's sister)
- Geum Bo-ra as Ji Kyung-sook (Eun-soo's mother)
- Song Jae-ho as Cha Hyun-min (Hye-rin's father)
- Yoon Mi-ra as Yoon Jung-im (Hye-rin's mother)
- Park Kwang-jung as Tae-joo's boss
- Jang Tae-sung
- Hong Soo-min
- Jung Young-geum
- Choi In-sook
- Yoo Tae-woong
- Kang Jung-hwa as Tae-joo's ex-girlfriend (cameo, ep 1 & 3)
- Lee Hee-joon as detective (cameo, ep 4)

== Production ==
Yoon Eun-hye was supposed to portray Han Eun-soo, and she attended the script reading and rehearsal for the drama's upcoming shooting. However, her then-agency Eight Peaks pulled her out in order for her to star in a series produced by the company itself (which never materialized). She was later replaced by Jung Yu-mi.

== Ratings ==
Episode #	Broadcasting Date	Audience Rating (Nationwide)
Episode 1	March 17, 2007	8.9%
Episode 2	March 18, 2007	8.2%
Episode 3	March 25, 2007	8.7%
Episode 4	March 31, 2007	8.2%
Episode 5	April 1, 2007	8.6%
Episode 6	April 7, 2007	7.9%
Episode 7	April 8, 2007	9.1%
Episode 8	April 14, 2007	7.7%
Episode 9	April 15, 2007	9.0%
Episode 10	April 21, 2007	8.0%
Episode 11	April 22, 2007	7.8%
Episode 12	April 28, 2007	6.5%
Episode 13	April 29, 2007	7.8%
Episode 14	May 5, 2007	7.5%
Episode 15	May 6, 2007	7.6%
Episode 16	May 12, 2007	7.0%
Episode 17	May 14, 2007	8.2%

== Original soundtrack ==
Que Sera Sera OST

Soundtrack album
- Genre: Korean Indie, Soundtrack
- Language: Korean, English
- Label: FLUXUS Music, Yedang Company

No.	Title	Artist	Length
1.	"Que Sera Sera"	Kim Sang Heon
2.	"We Are" (우리는)	Lee Seung Yeol	4:00
3.	"Moonlight" (월광)	W & Whale	3:20
4.	"Night Time"	Alex (Clazziquai)	3:20
5.	"Bless You"	Loveholic	3:46
6.	"Two Hands" (두손을)	Loveholics	4:09
7.	"Special Person" (특별한 사람)	My Aunt Mary	3:58
8.	"Beautiful One"	Kim Sang Heon	3:26
9.	"Dazzling Day"	Horan (Clazziquai)
10.	"Marilyn Monroe"	W & Whale	2:46
11.	"Lemon"	W & Whale	3:50
12.	"Lovers"	Kim Sang Heon	2:55
13.	"Two Hands" (inst.)	Jeon Young Ho
14.	"Marilyn Monroe ( Norma Jean Remix)"	W & Whale
