= 03 (album) =

Studio album by Urban Zakapa
- Released: (South Korea) December 3, 2013 (Taiwan) March 11, 2014
- Genres: R&B, ballad, K-Pop
- Labels: Fluxus Music; KT Music; Avex Taiwan

Urban Zakapa chronology
02 (2012)	03 (2013)	04 (2014)

03 is a Studio Album released by Urban Zakapa. The lead single is "Walk Backwards" (Korean: 거꾸로 걷는다), Korean actress Yoon Seung-ah featured the music video. The bonus track only on CD edition "(Korean: 그냥 조금)" appears on Korean TV Drama "Nine: Nine Time Travels", as 4th soundtrack.

== Track listing ==
No.	Title	Writer(s)	Length
1.	"One Day"	Soonil Kwon, Hyuna Jo	4:00
2.	"When Winter Comes"	Hyuna Jo	4:26
3.	"Blind"	Soonil Kwon	3:41
4.	"Do"	Hyuna Jo	3:06
5.	"Tell Me"	Hyuna Jo	3:04
6.	"Like Love"	Soonil Kwon, Yongin Park	3:09
7.	"I Dance"	Yongin Park	3:45
8.	"Blue"	Hyuna Jo	3:42
9.	"It's Fine"	Soonil Kwon	3:58
10.	"Dream"	Soonil Kwon	4:26
11.	"Walk Backwards"	Hyuna Jo	3:17
12.	"Just A Little(Bonus Track)"	Hyuna Jo	4:17

== Charts ==
Chart	Peak position
Gaon Weekly Albums Chart	11
Gaon Monthly Albums Chart	25

== Sales and certifications ==
Chart	Amount
Gaon physical sales	+4,615
