= Woman with a Suitcase =

2016 South Korean television series

- Promotional poster
- Also known as: Woman Who Pulls a Career
- Hangul: 캐리어를 끄는 여자
- RR: Kaerieoreul kkeuneun yeoja
- MR: K'aeriŏrŭl kkŭnŭn yŏja
- Genre: Legal; Melodrama; Comedy
- Created by: Lee Jung-hwan
- Written by: Kwon Eum-mi
- Directed by: Kang Dae-sun; Lee Jai-jin
- Starring: Choi Ji-woo; Joo Jin-mo; Jeon Hye-bin; Lee Joon
- Country of origin: South Korea
- Original language: Korean
- No. of episodes: 16

Production
- Executive producers: Jinnie Choi; Jung Park
- Running time: 60 minutes
- Production company: Studio Dragon

Original release
- Network: MBC TV
- Release: September 26 – November 15, 2016

Woman with a Suitcase (Korean: 캐리어를 끄는 여자) is a 2016 South Korean television series starring Choi Ji-woo, Joo Jin-mo, Jeon Hye-bin and Lee Joon. It aired on MBC every Monday and Tuesday at 22:00 (KST) from September 26 to November 15, 2016 for 16 episodes.

== Plot ==
The series tells the story of how Cha Geum-joo (Choi Ji-woo) went from a disgraced manager at a law firm to a great attorney.

== Cast ==
=== Main ===
- Choi Ji-woo as Cha Geum-joo
- Joo Jin-mo as Ham Bok-geo
- Jeon Hye-bin as Park Hye-joo
- Lee Joon as Ma Seok-woo

=== Supporting ===
Golden Tree

- Jin Kyung as Goo Ji-hyun
- Kim Byung-choon as Chief Hwang
- Bae Noo-ri as Oh An-na

K-Fact

- Choi Dae-sung as Go Goo-tae
- Ji Yi-soo as Baek Jin-seo
- Choi Tae-hwan as Choi Hoon-suk

Others

- Jang Hyun-sung as Lee Dong-soo
- Park Byung-eun as Prosecutor Kang
- Kim Min-ji as Seo Ji-ah
- Kim Young-pil as Lee Sang-yup
- Im Ji-hyun as Na Mi-sun
- Jung Yoo-jin as Madam Choi
- Choi Won-hong as Oh Kyung-hwan
- Yoon Ji-min as Jo Ye-ryung
- Oh Yeon-ah as Han Ji-won
- Min Sung-wook as Prosecutor Choi

=== Cameo ===
- Jo Jae-yoon as Na Gil-tae, Geum Joo's client (episode 1)
- Thunder as Cheondung (episode 5)
- Tae Jin-ah as himself (episode 9)

== Original soundtrack ==
Soundtrack album by Various Artists
- Genres: Pop; K-pop; soundtrack
- Labels: Fluxus Music; Bugs Corp.
- Producer: Kim Byung-chan (executive)

=== OST Part 1 ===
No.	Title	Lyrics	Music	Artist	Length
1.	"Small Comma" (작은 쉼표; Jakeun Swimpyo)	Seo Dong-sung	Park Sung-il (Copykumo), Kim Jun-suk	Alex of Clazziquai

=== OST Part 2 ===
No.	Title	Lyrics	Music	Artist	Length
1.	"If You Can Come" (와준다면; Wajundamyeon)	Kwon Jung-yeol of 10cm	Choi Jae-man	10cm
2.	"If You Can Come" (Instrumental)		Choi

=== OST Part 3 ===
No.	Title	Lyrics	Music	Artist	Length
1.	"Closer" (다가갈수록; Dagagalsurok)	Kang Hyun-min	Kang	EZ of Ggot Jam Project
2.	"Closer" (Instrumental)		Kang

=== OST Part 4 ===
No.	Title	Lyrics	Music	Artist	Length
1.	"Shining Bright" (밝아졌죠; Balg-Ajyeossjyo)	Kang Hyun-min	Kang	Hello Ga-Young
2.	"Shining Bright" (Instrumental)		Kang

=== OST Part 5 ===
No.	Title	Lyrics	Music	Artist	Length
1.	"Time Leading to Us" (우리 시간 속에 이어지기를; Uli Sigan Sog-e Ieojigileul)	Kim Sung-hoon (DJ Clazzi) of Clazziquai	Kim	ESBEE
2.	"Time Leading to Us" (Instrumental)		Kim

=== OST Part 6 ===
No.	Title	Lyrics	Music	Artist	Length
1.	"A Doll's Dream" (인형의 꿈; Inhyeongui Kkum)	Kang Hyun-min	Kang	Lee Tae-il of Block B
2.	"A Doll's Dream" (Instrumental)		Kang

== Ratings ==
Average TV viewership ratings
Ep.	Title	Original broadcast date	Average audience share			
Ep.	Title	Original broadcast date	TNmS		Nielsen Korea	
Ep.	Title	Original broadcast date	Nationwide	Seoul	Nationwide	Seoul
1	"Woman Carrying Queen Monaco's Bag" (모나코 왕비의 가방을 든 여자)	September 26, 2016	6.9% (NR)	6.8% (NR)	6.9% (NR)	7.9% (17th)
2	"I Got to Play the Bad Guy" (나는 나쁜 놈을 맡았다)	September 27, 2016	7.2% (18th)	7.7% (15th)	8.4% (15th)	9.7% (10th)
3	"Being Someone's Subordinate" (누군가에게 종속된다는 것)	October 3, 2016	7.0% (NR)	7.5% (17th)	7.9% (NR)	8.8% (15th)
4	"The Woman from the Rumors" (소문의 여자)	October 4, 2016	7.6% (17th)	7.9% (12th)	8.6% (15th)	9.0% (12th)
5	"Proving the Fact That He Likes You" (좋아한다는 주장의 압증)	October 10, 2016	7.1% (NR)	7.4% (17th)	8.2% (16th)	8.5% (15th)
6	"We're All Madonnas" (우리 모두 마돈나)	October 11, 2016	8.0% (19th)	9.0% (12th)	9.6% (8th)	10.7% (6th)
7	"Exactly One Secret" (딱 하나의 비밀)	October 17, 2016	7.1% (NR)	7.6% (18th)	8.2% (16th)	9.5% (10th)
8	"Good Reason to Be Alive" (살아 있어서 좋은 이유)	October 18, 2016	7.0% (20th)	7.2% (19th)	7.9% (16th)	9.3% (12th)
9	"I'm Demanding a Retrial for My Life" (내 인생의 재심을 청구합니다)	October 24, 2016	6.7% (NR)	7.3% (18th)	8.3% (15th)	9.7% (7th)
10	"Handcuffed Woman" (수갑을 찬 여자)	October 31, 2016	6.4% (NR)	6.4% (NR)	7.1% (NR)	8.0% (14th)
11	"Imagine, the Defendant's Eyes" (상상해봐요, 피고인의 눈빛을)	November 1, 2016	6.4% (20th)	6.6% (19th)	8.1% (13th)	8.6% (11th)
12	"Having Had Hit Rock Bottom..." (밑바닥에 서 봤다는 건..)	November 7, 2016	7.4% (19th)	7.7% (17th)	8.2% (15th)	9.2% (11th)
13	"Putting the Defendant's Benefit First" (피고인의 이익을 우선으로)	November 8, 2016	8.0% (15th)	9.2% (9th)	9.1% (10th)	9.9% (7th)
14	"When Losers Unite..." (못난이들이 합치면..)	November 14, 2016	7.4% (19th)	8.1% (15th)	8.9% (13th)	10.1% (9th)
15	"God's Eyes..." (신의 눈..)	November 15, 2016	8.2% (15th)	8.0% (13th)	8.9% (10th)	9.8% (7th)
16	"Not Giving Up" (포기하지 않는다는 것)	November 15, 2016	7.4% (17th)	8.1% (12th)	10.0% (7th)	11.3% (6th)
Average			7.3%	7.7%	8.4%	9.4%
In the table below, the blue numbers represent the lowest ratings and the red numbers represent the highest ratings.; NR denotes that the drama did not rank in the top 20 daily programs on that date.

== Awards and nominations ==
Year	Award	Category	Recipient	Result
2016	36th MBC Drama Awards	Top Excellence Award, Actor in a Special Project Drama	Joo Jin-mo	Nominated
2016	36th MBC Drama Awards	Top Excellence Award, Actress in a Special Project Drama	Choi Ji-woo	Nominated
2016	36th MBC Drama Awards	Excellence Award, Actor in a Special Project Drama	Lee Joon	Nominated
2016	36th MBC Drama Awards	Excellence Award, Actress in a Special Project Drama	Jeon Hye-bin	Nominated
2016	36th MBC Drama Awards	Golden Acting Award, Actor in a Special Project Drama	Jang Hyun-sung	Nominated
2016	36th MBC Drama Awards	Golden Acting Award, Actress in a Special Project Drama	Jin Kyung	Nominated
