= DJ Clazzi =

South Korean composer, singer, lyricist, record producer and DJ

DJ Clazzi 김성훈
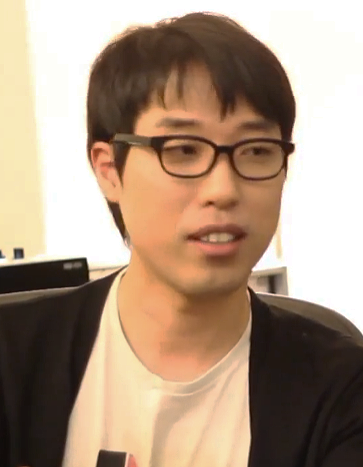
- DJ Clazzi in a 2011 interview

Background information
- Also known as: DJ Clazzi
- Born: Kim Sung-hoon; 15 November 1974 (age 51)
- Origin: South Korea
- Genres: Electronic, K-pop, J-pop, electropop, house
- Occupations: Composer, singer, lyricist, record producer, DJ
- Years active: 2001–present
- Label: Fluxus Music
- Member of: Clazziquai Project

- DJ Clazzi
- Hangul: 김성훈
- RR: Gim Seonghun
- MR: Kim Sŏnghun

Kim Sung-hoon (Korean: 김성훈; born 15 November 1974), better known by his stage name DJ Clazzi (DJ 클래지; or also simply as Clazzi), is a South Korean composer, singer, lyricist, record producer and DJ. He is the leader of the South Korean electropop band Clazziquai, that was formed in 2001 and debuted in 2004 with the album Instant Pig. In January 2012, he made his solo debut with Infant, an album that includes collaborations with a number of artists, including Seulong of 2AM and members of Sunny Hill.

== Biography ==
=== Early life ===
Kim Sung-hoon was born in South Korea on 15 November 1974. He moved to Canada to attend Capilano University in British Columbia, where he majored in music technology.

=== Debut with Clazziquai (2001–2010) ===
DJ Clazzi formed the group Clazziquai with singers Alex and Horan in 2001. They began releasing music on the Internet that resulted in the release of their first studio album Instant Pig, which appeared on 14 May 2004 by the label Seoul Record (now LOEN Entertainment) in South Korea. It was also released later that year in Japan by Avex Trax, and in Taiwan under Avex Taiwan.

The group released their second album Color Your Soul on 22 September 2005, and a third titled Love Child of the Century on 7 June 2007. Their most recent studio album is Mucho Punk, released on 14 July 2009. Between studio albums, the group has also released a number of remix albums.

=== Solo debut (2011–present) ===
In 2011, DJ Clazzi began collaborating with various South Korean artists. He first collaborated with 2AM singer Seulong, who provided the vocals for the single "How We Feel." Shortly after that, he released the single "Love & Hate," a collaboration with Yi Sung Yol and rapper MYK.

DJ Clazzi initially planned on releasing his debut solo album in December 2011. On 17 January 2012, he released the full-length album Infant through the label LOEN Entertainment. Although all of the songs on the album have vocals, all of them are from other artists. Along with Seulong, Yi Sung-yol, and MYK, the album also features singers Whale of the group W&Whale, Jinsil, Hyun-song and Su-ryun of The Koxx, Christina, Kim Wan-sung, Jang Woo-hyuk and Cho Hyun-a of Urban Zakapa and Kota and Jubi of Sunny Hill.

Clazziquai released their studio album Blessed on 5 February 2013.

== Musical style ==
"Love & Hate (Ft. Yi Sung Yol & MYK)" (2011)
Clazzi's music typically incorporates elements of electronic music, as in this song from his album Infant.

DJ Clazzi's music is described in general as electronica or electronic music. When asked to define his music genre in an interview, he stated, "I, as a maker of this music, find it hard to tell which genre it is," and that "it should be for the listener to decide."

He has named the English rock band Pink Floyd as his biggest inspiration.

== Discography ==
=== Studio albums ===
Title	Album details	Peak chart positions	Sales
Title	Album details	KOR	Sales
Infant	Released: January 17, 2012; Label: Fluxus Music, Windmill Entertainment; Formats: CD, digital download; Track listing: 1. Bad Girl feat. Whale; 2. Love & Hate feat. Yi Sung-yol, MYK; 3. Where's Dance feat. Jinsil; 4. 40 Nights feat. Hyunsong, Suryun; 5. Star Child feat. Christina, MYK; 6. How We Feel (우리 변한거잖아) feat. Seulong; 7. Can Only Feel feat. Kim Wan-sun; 8. Loving You feat. Jang Woo-hyuk, Hyunah; 9. Sexy Doll feat. Kota, Jubi, MYK; 10. Crazy For Love feat. Christina	14	KOR: 1,106

=== Singles ===
Title	Year	Peak chart positions	Sales	Album
Title	Year	KOR	Sales	Album
"How We Feel" (우리 변한거잖아) feat. Seulong	2011	54	KOR: 166,486	Infant
"Sexy Doll" feat. Kota, Jubi, MYK	2012	63	KOR: 130,105	Infant
"Love & Hate" feat. Yi Sung-yol, MYK	2012	99	KOR: 50,669	Infant
