= Yoon Seung-ah =

South Korean actress (born 1983)

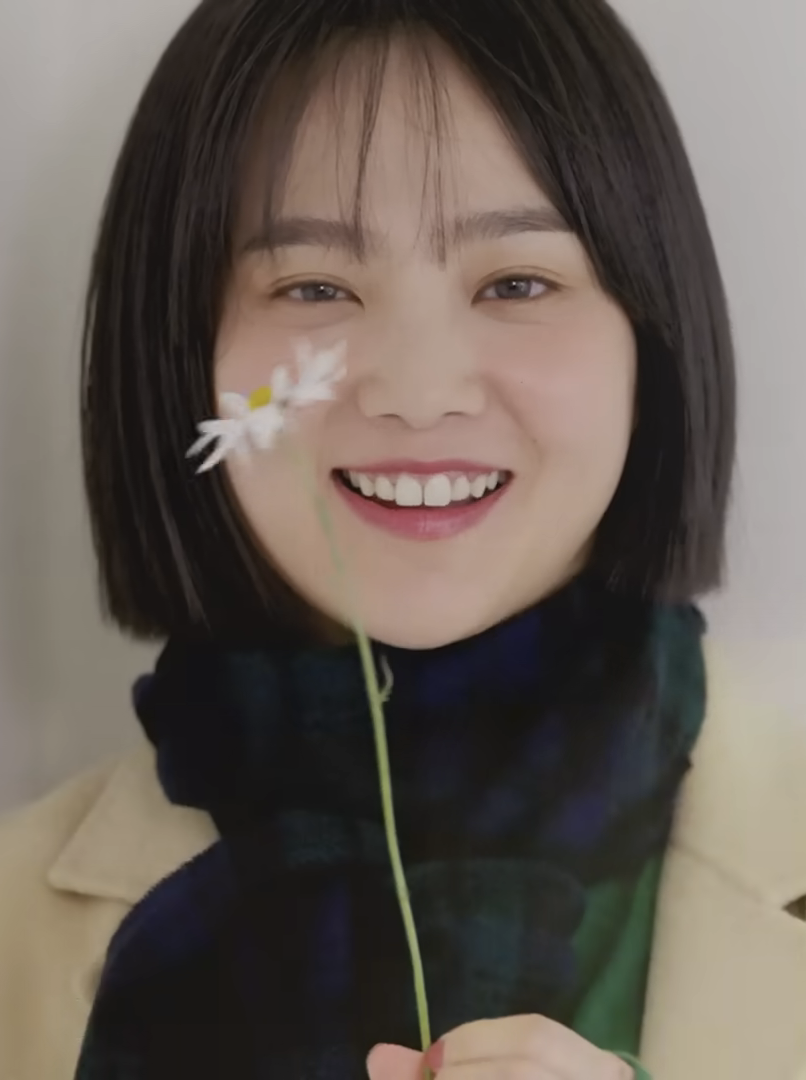
- Yoon in October 2022
- Born: September 29, 1983 (age 43); Nam District, Gwangju, South Korea
- Education: Chosun University - Textile Arts
- Occupation: Actress
- Years active: 2006–present
- Agents: Fantagio; Prain TPC
- Spouse: Kim Mu-yeol (m. 2015)
- Children: 1

Korean name
- Hangul: 윤승아
- Hanja: 尹承雅
- RR: Yun Seunga
- MR: Yun Sŭnga

Yoon Seung-ah (Korean: 윤승아; born September 29, 1983) is a South Korean actress. She debuted as a magazine model, and first gained attention in 2006 by appearing in two music videos by Alex Chu and Ji Sun. After finishing her art major, Yoon pursued an acting career, with supporting roles in the television series Playful Kiss and Moon Embracing the Sun. She was cast in her first leading role in the 2012 cable romantic comedy Miss Panda and Mr. Hedgehog.

== Career ==
After being discovered on the street, Yoon Seung-ah began her career as a model, appearing in the magazines CeCi, Elle Girl Korea, Vogue Girl Korea and Cosmopolitan Korea and landing exclusive contracts with Nivea and J.Estina.

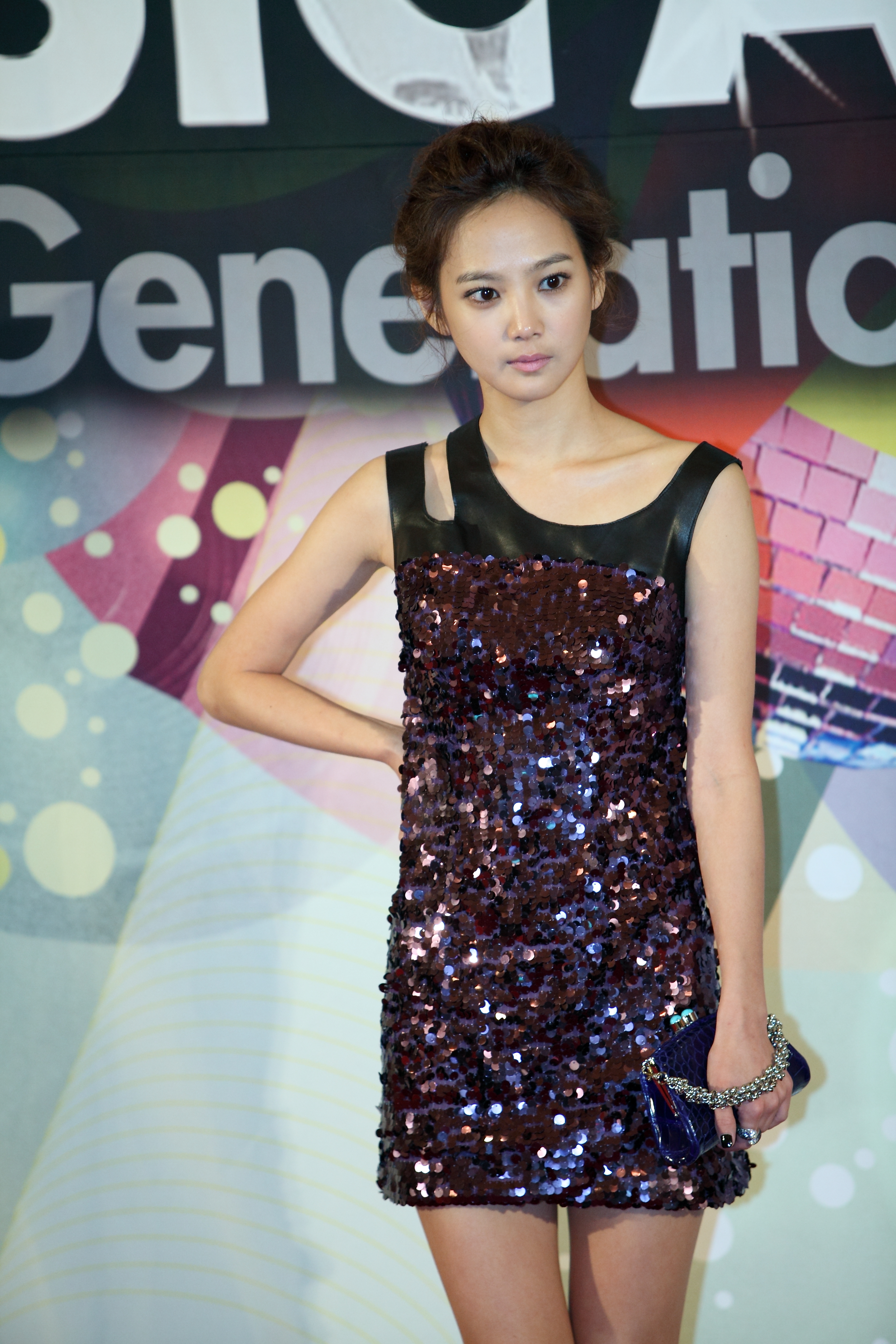
Yoon in 2010

Yoon first caught the public's eye in 2006 in Alex Chu and Ji Sun's music videos for "Very Heartbreaking Words" and "I Love You", and received the moniker of "Snail Girl." She waited to finish her art major in college before debuting, and gave up a chance to study art abroad in order to pursue her acting career. Supporting roles in films and TV series followed, notably as Ha-ni's quirky best friend Min-ah in romantic comedy Playful Kiss, and as slave-turned-swordswoman Seol in the hit period drama Moon Embracing the Sun.

In 2012, she landed her first leading role in Channel A rom-com series Miss Panda and Mr. Hedgehog, playing a cake shop owner opposite Super Junior's Lee Donghae. Later that year, Yoon hosted the fashion reality show Sold Out on cable channel OnStyle.

== Personal life ==
=== Marriage and family ===
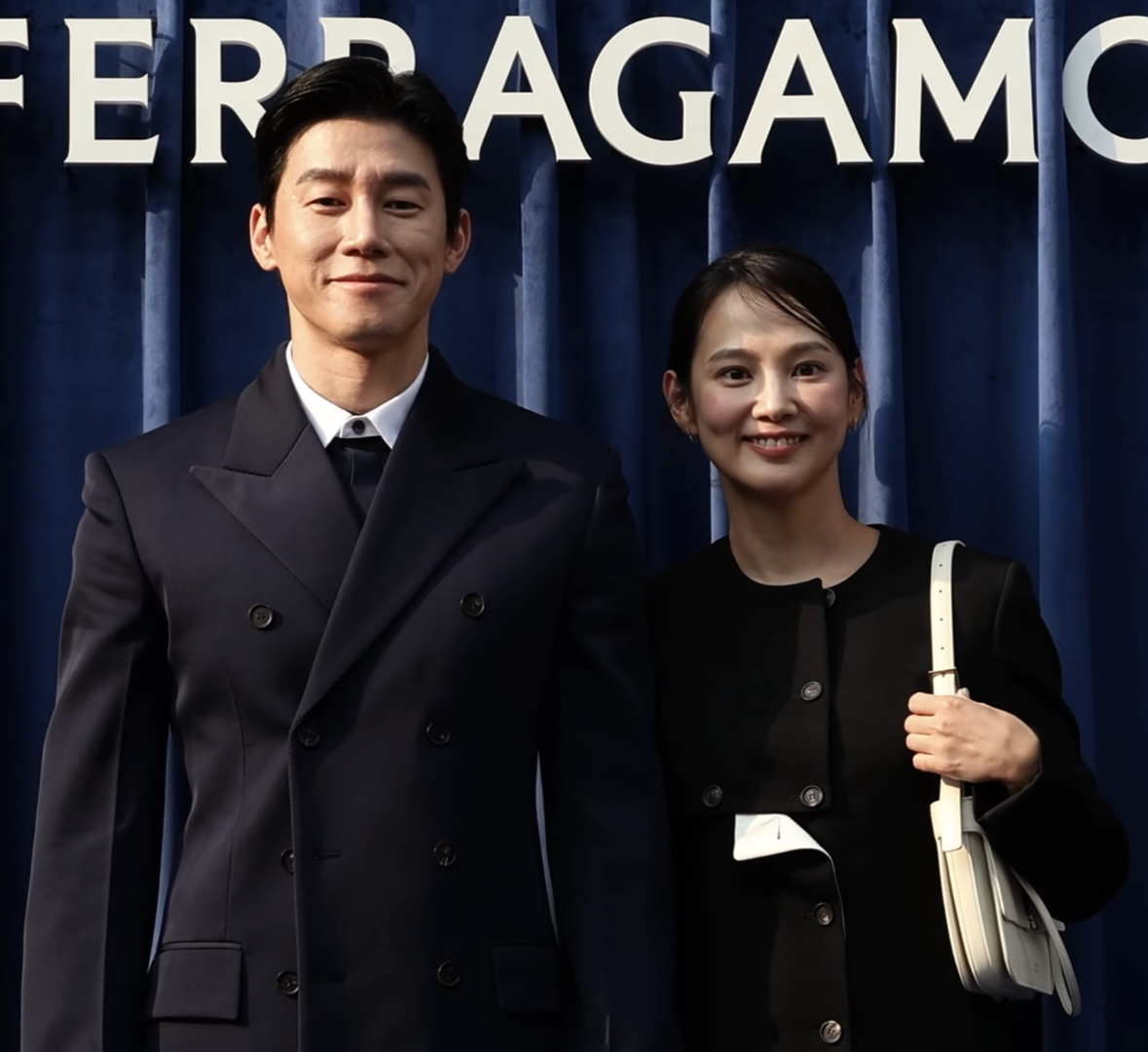
Kim and Yoon in 2026

After a romantic tweet that actor Kim Mu-yeol meant to be a private message to Yoon was accidentally posted on his Twitter page, their agencies confirmed in February 2012 that the two were dating. Yoon and Kim married on April 4, 2015.

In December 2022, their agency announced that Yoon is pregnant with the couple's first child and expected to give birth in June 2023. She gave birth to a son, Kim Won, on June 8.

== Filmography ==
=== Television series ===
Year	Title	Role	Network
2006	Rainbow Romance	(guest)	MBC
2006	Unstoppable High Kick!	(bit part, episode 1)	MBC
2007	Coffee Prince	Girl playing cards on the plane (bit part, episode 1)	MBC
2009	Hero	Jo Yu-ri	MBC
2010	Playful Kiss	Dokgo Min-ah	MBC
2010	All My Love for You	Kim Saet-byul	MBC
2012	Moon Embracing the Sun	Seol	MBC
2012	Miss Panda and Mr. Hedgehog	Pan Da-yang	Channel A
2013	Empire of Gold	Jang Hee-joo	SBS
2013	After School: Lucky or Not	(cameo, episode 2)	Nate Hoppin/ BTV/T-store
2014	I Need Romance 3	Jung Hee-jae	tvN
2016	The Birth of a Married Woman	Yeong-hee	Naver tvcast

=== Film ===
Year	Title	Role
2006	Siame	
2008	Hwan (Illusion)	
2010	Death Bell 2: Bloody Camp	Jeong Tae-yeon
2011	Goodbye My Smile	Ha-rin
2011	Funny Neighbors	Seo Yoon-mi
2014	The Legacy	Chae Kyung-hee
2015	The Deal	Min Soo-kyung
2017	Method	Hee-won
2019	Lucky Chan-sil	Sophie

=== Variety shows ===
Year	Title	Notes/Ref.
2006	Love Choice (aka Selection Couple)	Cast member
2012	Sold Out	Host
2022	Next Label	Special judge

=== Music video appearances ===
Year	Song title	Artist
2006	"Very Heartbreaking Words" (Part 1) / "I Love You" (Part 2)	Alex Chu and Jisun
2006	"Never Mind"	Big Mama
2006	"Thank You"	Choi Jae-hoon
2006	"Hello"	The Film
2007	"Because I Love You"	The Cross
2007	"Super Hero"	Lee Seung-hwan
2010	"What Should We Finish?"	Soyeon
2011	"Stay the Night"	Jeong Seung-won
