= Ibadi (band) =

- Origin: Seoul, South Korea
- Genres: Rock; folk; indie
- Years active: 2008–present
- Labels: Fluxus Music
- Members: Horan; Geojung; Justin Kim

Ibadi (Korean: 이바디) is a South Korean rock band formed by Fluxus Music in 2008. They debuted on April 3, 2008, with Story Of Us.

== Members ==
- Horan – Vocals
- Geojung – Drums, guitar, production
- Justin Kim – Bass guitar, production

== Discography ==
=== Studio albums ===
Title	Album details	Peak chart positions	Sales
Title	Album details	KOR	Sales
Story Of Us	Released: April 3, 2008; Label: Fluxus Music, K&C Music; Formats: CD, digital download	—	—
Voyage	Released: October 13, 2011; Label: Fluxus Music, K&C Music; Formats: CD, digital download	30	KOR: 1,059

=== Extended plays ===
Title	Album details	Peak chart positions	Sales
Title	Album details	KOR	Sales
Songs For Ophelia	Released: March 5, 2009; Label: Fluxus Music, K&C Music; Formats: CD, digital download	—	—

=== Soundtrack appearances ===
Year	Title	Album
2009	"Morning Call"	지금 사랑하지 않는 자, 모두 유죄 OST
2010	"Strolling" (산책)	Loveholic OST
2011	"Solitude"	Brain OST
