= I Don't Love You (disambiguation) =

"I Don't Love You" is a 2007 song by My Chemical Romance.

"I Don't Love You" may also refer to:

- "I Don't Love You" (Lindsay Ell song), 2020
- "I Don't Love You", a song by Bread from the 1972 album Baby I'm-a Want You
- "I Don't Love You", a song by Conway Twitty from the 1993 album Final Touches
- "I Don't Love You !??", a song by Koda Kumi from the 2011 album Dejavu
- "I Don't Love You", a 2011 song by Elaiza
- "I Don't Love You", a 1978 song by The Dishrags
- "I Don't Love You", a 2016 song by Urban Zakapa
- "I Don't Love You", a song by Cubic U from the 1998 album Precious
- "I Don't Love You", a song by Lost Dogs from the 1996 album The Green Room Serenade, Part One
- "I Don't Love You", a 1965 song by The Tripp
- "I Don't Love You", a song by Mickey Newbury from the 2002 album A Long Road Home
- "I Don't Love You", a song by Cruel Youth from the 2016 EP +30mg

== See also ==
- I Don't Like You (disambiguation)
