= Maeng Yu-na =

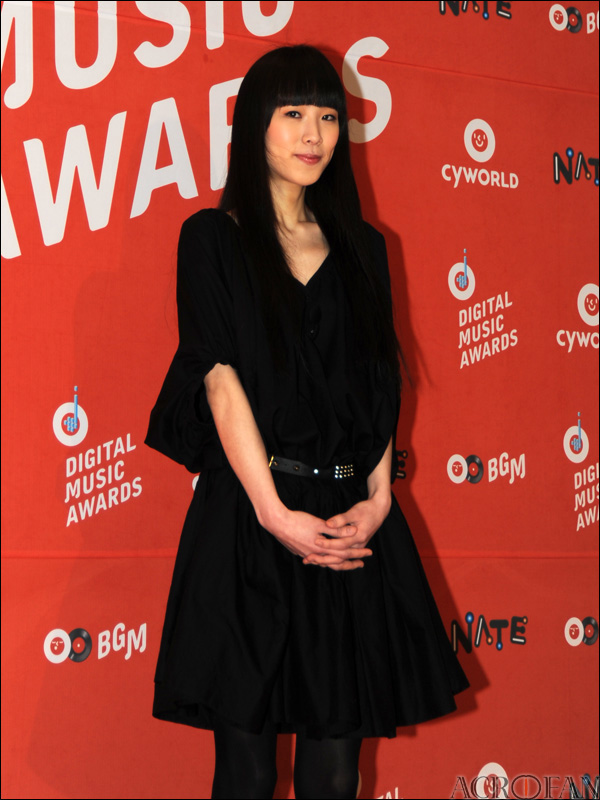
- Born: 28 October 1989
- Died: 26 December 2018 (aged 29)
- Other names: "Memory"
- Occupation: Singer
- Years active: 2007–2018

Maeng Yu-na (28 October 1989 – 26 December 2018) was a South Korean singer. She performed under the stage name "Memory" before changing it to her real name in 2010. Maeng released a total of ten works, two full-length albums and eight single albums. She also performed on the original soundtracks of the television series' Lovers in Prague, Spring Waltz and The Famous Seven Princesses between 2006 and 2007.

== Biography ==
Maeng was born on 28 October 1989. She was the daughter of the singer's Cho Yong-pil's former manager Maeng Jung-ho. Maeng wanted to become a singer but her father opposed this choice of career on several occasions because he felt it would not be easy for her. She was inspired by Cho during her childhood years. In 2005, she performed on the original soundtracks of the television series' Lovers in Prague and Spring Waltz. The following year, Maeng sung on the original soundtrack of the television programme The Famous Seven Princesses. She made her professional debut under the stage name "Memory" in Japan in 2007. After making her debut in Japan, Maeng released her first full-length album in Korea called The Peacock 001. It became a commercial success when one of the album's songs "Paradise" was used as background music for the television entertainment programme Introducing the Star's Friend broadcast by Munhwa Broadcasting Corporation (MBC). This earned Maeng the Rookie of the Month award at the Cyworld Digital Music Awards in February 2009.

She stopped using the stage name "Memory" until 2009, and began using her birth date in her professional life as a result of an image problem since the term "Memory" was widely used as a term for computer memory. Maeng also began working with a rival management company at the conclusion of 2009. In 2010, she released the single Don't Ask and performed in a mini-concert with the guitarist Kim Do-kyun at MBC. Maeng's single Don't Ask was given airtime on the musical broadcasts on MBC Radio and she went on to release the modern rock singles Vanilla Bongbong and Cherry Pie the following year. In September 2012, she travelled to Nepal to volunteer alongside fellow Korean musicians with construction volunteers at a remote village called Birethanti to play music to local children as part of the television documentary KOICA's Dream. In October 2014, Maeng released her second full-length album Comma with a theme of Relax to You. She became a jazz musician during the album's production and collaborated with the jazz musician Yoon Seok-cheol on its lead single Let's Dance.

At the time of her death, Maeng was working and preparing for the release of her third full-length album in June 2019 and was invited to take up a professorship at the Department of Applied Music at an unnamed university. During her career, she released a total of ten works, two full-length albums and eight single albums.

== Personal life ==
Maeng was a veterinarian from 2014 onwards. On 26 December 2018, she died of a heart attack at her home; she did not have any medical conditions. Maeng received a small, private funeral with close acquaintances, and she was buried at Gimpo's Rainbow Hill Memorial Park.
