= Miss Panda and Mr. Hedgehog =

South Korean television series

- Promotional poster
- Also known as: Ms. Panda and Mr. Hedgehog; Panda and Porcupine
- Genre: Romantic comedy
- Written by: Han Joon-young
- Directed by: Lee Min-cheol
- Starring: Lee Donghae; Yoon Seung-ah
- Country of origin: South Korea
- Original language: Korean
- No. of episodes: 16

Production
- Executive producer: Kim Sang-heon
- Producer: Song Hae-sung
- Production location: Korea
- Production company: Lion Fish

Original release
- Network: Channel A
- Release: 18 August – 7 October 2012

Miss Panda and Mr. Hedgehog (Korean: 판다양과 고슴도치; RR: Pandayanggwa Goseumdochi; lit. Panda and Hedgehog) is a 2012 South Korean television series starring Lee Donghae of Super Junior and Yoon Seung-ah. Produced by Song Hae-sung's TV production venture Lion Fish, it aired on Channel A from August 18 to October 7, 2012 on Saturdays and Sundays at 21:55 for 16 episodes.

== Plot ==
The story revolves around Go Seung-ji (Lee Donghae), a talented patissier who exudes a cold and tough exterior (like a hedgehog) which conceals his kind and understanding heart, and Pan Da-yang (Yoon Seung-ah), an optimistic and easygoing cafe owner with a laid-back personality (like a panda).

== Cast ==
- Lee Donghae as Go Seung-ji, an ex-con amnesiac turned patissier whose nickname means hedgehog
- Yoon Seung-ah as Pan Da-yang, an orphan who manages her parents' crisis-hit patisserie
- Choi Jin-hyuk as Choi Won-il, CEO of prominent patisserie Saint-Honore, and childhood friend of Pan Da-yang
- Yoo So-young as Kang Eun-bi
- Lee Moon-hee as Park Mi-hyang
- Yang Hee-kyung as Kim Kap-soon
- Han Soo-min as Pan Da-na, the younger but wiser sister of Pan Da-yang
- Yoo Seung-mok as Kil Dong-goo
- Hyun Suk as Choi Jae-kyum, President of Saint-Honore at severe odds with stepson and CEO Won-il
- Hong Yeo-jin as Hwang Jung-rye
- Song In-hwa as Choi Won-yi, tomboyish sister of Choi Won-il, and shareholder of Saint-Honore
- Park Sang-hoon as Jo Kyun-woo
- Park Ha-na as Park Ha-na
- Nam Ji-hyun (Note: Credited as Son Ji-hyun.) as herself

== Soundtrack ==
1. "Plz Don't" - Lee Donghae
2. "Loving You" - Super Junior-K.R.Y
3. "Inverted Love" - Choi Jin-hyuk
4. "Promise" - Kwon Soon-il (Urban Zakapa)
5. "Don't Go" - Lee Donghae
6. "Love Stops" - Park Ha-na
