= I Don't Like You (disambiguation) =

"I Don't Like You" is a song by Eva Simons

== Songs ==
I Don't Like You may also refer to:

- "I Don't Like You", a song by Ala Boratyn from Higher
- "I Don't Like You", a song by Barkmarket from L. Ron
- "I Don't Like You", a song by Bo Diddley from The Black Gladiator
- "I Don't Like You", a song by Buzzoven from Sore
- "I Don't Like You", a song by Electric Six from I Shall Exterminate Everything Around Me That Restricts Me from Being the Master
- "I Don't Like You", a song by K. Michelle from All Monsters Are Human
- "I Don't Like You", a song by the Muffs from Hamburger
- "I Don't Like You", a song by the Regrettes from Feel Your Feelings Fool!
- "I Don't Like You", a song by Roger Miret and the Disasters from 1984
- "I Don't Like You", a song by Skrewdriver from All Skrewed Up
- "I Don't Like You", a song by Stiff Little Fingers from Nobody's Heroes
- "I Don't Like You", a song by Bloody Civilian
- "I Don't Like You", a song by Camille Trail
- "I Don't Like You", a song by Grace VanderWaal
- "I Don't Like You", a song by Lowlives
- "I Don't Like You", a song by Mystikal and Fiend
- "I Don't Like You", a song by Nightcaps
- "I Don't Like You", a song by The Sacred Mushroom
- "I Don't Like You", a song by THEESatisfaction
- "I Don't Like You", a song from Galavant
- "I Don't Like You", a song from La Strada performed by Bernadette Peters
- "Ooh Way Ooh (I Don't Like You)", a song by the Eyeliners from Here Comes Trouble

== Other uses ==
- "I Don't Like You", an episode of the 2016 series Ben 10
- "I Don't Like You", a chapter of Unbalance ×2

== See also ==
- I Don't Love You (disambiguation)
