= Metrotronics =

EP by Clazziquai
- Released: October 23, 2008
- Genre: Electronica

Clazziquai chronology
| Robotica (2007) | Metrotronics (2008) |

Singles from Metrotronics
- 1. "Flea" Released: October 2008

Metrotronics is a 2008 EP from the South Korean group Clazziquai. Clazziquai teamed up with Pentavision for their Metro Project that soon packaged the minor release of DJ MAX series after DJ MAX Portable 2 named as DJMax Portable Clazziquai Edition for PlayStation Portable.

7 songs from Metrotronics (Electronics, Flea, Color, Night Stage, Creator, Freedom, Come to me) are included for gameplay in DJMax Portable Clazziquai Edition. In addition, Flea is the opening song to the game, Creator is the button mode selection music, Night Stage is the music for the song results screen, and Electronics is the Stage Clear results screen music and the Network mode select music.

== CD ==
1. Electronics
2. Flea
3. Beat in love
4. Color
5. Night stage
6. Creator
7. Beautiful stranger (sliced cheese remix)
8. Beat in love (Yasutaka Nakata [capsule] remix)

== DVD ==
1. Electronics
2. Flea
3. Beat in love
4. Color
5. Night stage
6. Creator
7. Come to me
8. Freedom
9. Flea + Beat in love (M/V Making with Directors Commentary)
10. DJMAX promotion
