= Loveholics =

South Korean modern rock group

Loveholic
- Origin: South Korea
- Genres: Pop, alternative rock
- Years active: 2002–2012
- Label: Fluxus Music
- Past members: Kang Hyun-min; Lee Jae-hak; Ji-sun

Loveholics (Korean: 러브홀릭스), previously known as Loveholic (러브홀릭) was a South Korean modern rock group founded in April 2002 who released their first album in 2003. The band successfully released six albums, including a short compilation album and a reissue of the original album with additional tracks before separating. The band is well known for their success, beginning with their first album and the success of its pop song, "놀러와 (Come On)", and the cover of member Kang Hyun-min's song, "인형의 꿈 (Doll's Dream)" as well as having its songs featured in many films. The band's song "신기루 (Mirage)" also was used as the ending theme to the Japanese anime, Black Blood Brothers soon after the song's album release. They have participated in many soundtracks for MBC and KBS.

After Ji-sun's departure, the remaining duo renamed the band Loveholics and featured guest vocals to supplement the band's sound up until disbandment.

== Members ==
Kang Hyun-min (강현민; born September 15, 1969) made his debut as a pop musician by winning the silver prize at the 3rd Yoo Jae-ha Music Contest. Kang Hyun-min was once a member of the defunct male duo Ilgiyebo (meaning "weather forecast"). In 2001, he released his own solo album. He has produced music for many artists including; The The, Park Hye-kyung, Shin Hyo-beom, Lee Moon-se, Suh Young-eun, K2, Park Ki-young, Sung Si-kyung and Yim Hyoung-joo. He has been working in various fields of the pop music industry also creating music for various films like Christmas in August, A Pure Love Story and The Wonderful Days. Beside Jisun, he is the second most featured lead vocalist for Loveholic.

Lee Jae-hak (이재학; born December 31, 1971) is a veteran songwriter who used to be a member of a band called The Elephant. He is one of the principal lyricists for the Loveholics and he is the composer and lyricist of the band's eponymous song, "Loveholic". He also composed most of the songs on the soundtrack for the 2009 film Take Off.

Hwang Ji-sun (황지선; born October 23, 1979), who had been singing at Hongdae clubs was auditioned by Kang Hyun-min and Lee Jae-hak who had wanted to start a band. Jisun left Loveholic in 2007. Reasons for the split were vague but it was clear that the paths that both Jisun and the rest of the group wanted to go down differed. She was later signed up by Woollim Entertainment, and her solo album was released in February 2009.

== Discography ==
=== Studio albums ===
Title	Album details	Peak chart positions	Sales
Title	Album details	KOR	Sales
Florist	Released: April 25, 2003; Label: Fluxus Music; Formats: CD, cassette; Track listing: 1. Easy Come Easy Go; 2. Loveholic; 3. Rainy Day; 4. 슈퍼스타; 5. 기분이 좋아; 6. 슬픈 영화; 7. 녹슨 열쇠; 8. 놀러와; 9. Dream; 10. 리버풀 키드의 생애; 11. 다시 피운 꽃 12. Sad Story; 13. 너의 앞길에 햇살만 가득하길	11	KOR: 74,254+
Invisible Things	Released: August 26, 2004; Label: Fluxus Music; Formats: CD, cassette; Track listing: 1. Magic; 2. Sky; 3. Want you hear 4. Blue 923; 5. Bless you 6. Kiss me, hold me 7. 동화처럼; 8. Sunglass; 9. 너는...; 10. Sylvia; 11. Hyri-rumaya; 12. Crazy; 13. My dear...	15	KOR: 27,711+
Nice Dream	Released: April 13, 2006; Label: Fluxus Music; Formats: CD, cassette; Track listing: 1. 일요일 맑음; 2. 차라의 숲 3. 화분; 4. 나의 태양은 지고; 5. One Love; 6. TV; 7. Leave Me; 8. 달의 축제; 9. 신기루; 10. 그대만 있다면; 11. Run; 12. 녹색 소파; 13. 인어, 세상을 걷다	6	KOR: 24,042+
In The Air	Released: September 14, 2009; Label: Fluxus Music; Formats: CD; Track listing: 1. Raining (feat. Christina); 2. 바람이 참 매섭다 (feat. Whale); 3. 아픔 (feat. Jang Eun-a); 4. 쉼, 비밀, 위로 (feat. U Mi-jin); 5. Beautiful (feat. Hye-Kyoung Park, Park Ki-young); 6. MIRACLE BLUE (feat. Shin Min-a); 7. Message from Tokyo (feat. Miki); 8. 몰라야 할 말 (feat. Arim); 9. 나에게 그댄 (feat. Kang Hyun Min); 10. Butterfly (feat. Christina, Yi Sung Yol, Horan, Alex Chu, Park Ki-young, Whale, Jung Soon-yong, Miki, Haewon, Jang Eun-a)	No data*	No data*
"—" denotes releases that did not chart. *Data not available for 2009.

=== Special albums ===
Title	Album details	Peak chart positions
Title	Album details	KOR
Re-Wind	Released: November 23, 2006; Track listing: 1. 오, 그대는 아름다운 여인; 2. 바람아 멈추어다오; 3. 늘 4. 정원; 5. 안녕하세요; 6. 기분좋은; 7. 가리워진 길 8. 처음 느낌 그대로; 9. 출발; 10. Happy X-Mas (War Is Over); 11. 인형의 꿈 (Bonus Track)	—
Dramatic & Cinematic	Released: March 11, 2008; Track listing: 1. 메아리 (눈의 여왕); 2. 사랑하니까 (러브홀릭); 3. 화분 (커피 프린스 1호점); 4. One Love (봄의 왈츠); 5. Bless You (케세라세라); 6. 인형의 꿈 (좋은 사람); 7. 그대만 있다면 (어느 멋진 날); 8. 슬픈영화 (좋은 사람); 9. 이별 못한 이별 (내 이름은 김삼순); 10. 우리 사랑하지만 (어느 멋진 날); 11. 두손을 (케세라세라); 12. Dream (좋은 사람); 13. 그대는 (위대한 유산); 14. 정원 (8월의 크리스마스); 15. Sylvia (마법사들); 16. 신기루 (Black Blood Brothers); 17. Want You Here (하나와 앨리스); 18. 일요일 맑음 (가족의 탄생); 19. 슈퍼스타 (미녀는 괴로워); 20. Rainy Day (기동무투전 G 건담); 21. 너는 (외출); 22. 외출 (외출); 23. 혼자 가지마 (기동무투전 G 건담); 24. 놀러와 (싱글즈); 25. Maria (미녀는 괴로워, Live Ver.)	—
"—" denotes releases that did not chart.

=== Soundtrack appearances ===
Year	Title	Album
2003	"Come On" (놀러와)	Singles OST
2003	"Doll's Dream" (인형의 꿈)	Good People OST
2003	"Dream"	Good People OST
2005	"Sculpture" (조각)	Wonderful Life OST
2005	"Because I Love You" (사랑하니까)	Loveholic OST
2005	"Farewell without Farewell" (이별 못한이별)	My Name is Kim Sam Soon OST
2005	"Do Not Go Alone" (혼자 가지마)	Mobile Fighter G Gundam OST
2005	"Full House / Sweet Love"	Full House Sweet Love OST (Taiwan Version)
2005	"April Snow" (외출)	April Snow OST
2005	"You Are" (너는)	April Snow OST
2006	"One Love"	''Spring Waltz OST
2006	"You Are" (그대는)	Great Expectations OST
2006	"If I Had Only You" (그대만 있다면)	One Fine Day OST
2006	"Echo" (메아리)	The Snow Queen OST
2006	"Superstar" (슈퍼스타)	200 Pounds Beauty OST
2007	"Bless You" (가사 첨부)	Que Sera, Sera OST
2008	"You Are the Reason I Cry" (눈물나는 사람 너야) (feat. Woo Mi-jin - 우미진)	Who Are You? OST
2008	"I Will Remember" (기억할게요)	Who Are You? OST
2008	"Merry Go Round" (feat. Han Jip - 한집)	Who Are You? OST
2008	"Flowerpot" (화분)	We Got Married OST
2008	"Mirage" (신기루)	Black Blood Brothers OST
2009	"What Do I Do" (어떡하죠)	Boys Over Flowers OST
2009	"Butterfly"	Take Off OST
2009	"Superstar" (슈퍼스타)	I Love You OST

== Solo works ==
=== Jisun ===
==== Studio albums ====
Title	Album details	Peak chart positions
Title	Album details	KOR
인어... 집으로 돌아오다 (Mermaid... Come Home)	Released: February 2, 2009; Label: Mnet; Track listing: 1. Someone Somewhere Someday; 2. 인어... 집으로 돌아오다; 3. 안녕 마음아; 4. 롤러코스터러브; 5. Universe; 6. Windflower (feat. Alex); 7. 그는 널 사랑하지 않아; 8. 보고싶어; 9. 지구인; 10. Phony War; 11. 우리가 나눈 사랑의 진실; 12. L O V E 13. Polaris	—

==== Extended plays ====
Title	Album details	Peak chart positions
Title	Album details	KOR
바람 (Wish)	Released: June 10, 2011; Label: Woolim Entertainment, Loen Entertainment; Track listing: 1. Let The Wind Blow (바람아 불어라); 2. Ever After; 3. Thanks To	—

==== Single albums ====
Title	Album details	Peak chart positions
Title	Album details	KOR
What a Feeling	Released: March 3, 2009; Track listing: 1. What a Feeling	—

== Awards ==
=== Mnet Asian Music Awards ===
Year	Category	Work	Result
2003	Best Mixed Group	"Loveholic"	Nominated
2004	Best Mixed Group	"Sky"	Nominated
2004	Best Group Video	"Sky"	Nominated
2006	Best OST	"그대만 있다면"	Nominated

=== SBS 가요대전 Gayo Awards ===
Year	Category	Work	Result
2006	Rock Award	"차라의숲"	Won
2006	Bonsang	"차라의숲"	Nominated
