= My Lovely Sam Soon =

2005 South Korean television series

- Promotional poster
- Hangul: 내 이름은 김삼순
- Lit.: My Name Is Kim Sam-soon
- RR: Nae ireumeun Gim Samsun
- MR: Nae irŭmŭn Kim Samsun
- Genre: Romance; Comedy; Drama
- Based on: My Name Is Kim Sam-soon by Ji Soo-hyun
- Written by: Kim Do-woo
- Directed by: Kim Yoon-cheol
- Starring: Kim Sun-a; Hyun Bin; Jung Ryeo-won; Daniel Henney
- Opening theme: "Be My Love" by Clazziquai
- Ending theme: "She Is" by Clazziquai
- Country of origin: South Korea
- Original language: Korean
- No. of episodes: 16

Production
- Producer: Kim Sa-hyun (MBC)
- Camera setup: Multi-camera
- Running time: 70 minutes
- Production company: MBC Production

Original release
- Network: MBC TV
- Release: June 1 – July 21, 2005

Related
- Ako si Kim Samsoon (Philippine adaptation); Janji Jaya (Indonesian adaptation)

My Lovely Sam Soon (Korean: 내 이름은 김삼순) is a 2005 South Korean television series based on the internet novel of the same title by Ji Soo-hyun, which was published on March 9, 2004. Touted as the Korean version of Bridget Jones's Diary, it starred Kim Sun-a (who gained 15 pounds for the role), Hyun Bin, Jung Ryeo-won and Daniel Henney. The series aired on MBC from June 1 to July 21, 2005 on Wednesdays and Thursdays at 21:55 (KST) for 16 episodes.

"Sam-sun" is an old-fashioned name in Korean culture. It can be translated as "3rd daughter"; sam (삼) is three and sun (순) is a feminine indicator.

The romantic comedy-drama series was a huge hit, with an average viewership rating of 37.6% and its peak rating of 49.1% (for the finale) makes it one of the highest-rated Korean dramas of all time. It also won numerous awards, including the Baeksang Arts Awards Grand Prize for TV and the Grand Prize at the MBC Drama Awards for Kim Sun-ah.

An abridged 8-episode version of the series was released on Wavve on September 6, 2024 which is part of the platform's "New Classic Project".

== Synopsis ==
Kim Sam-soon (Kim Sun-a) is loud and brash, yet insecure about her weight. She has always been embarrassed by her old-fashioned first name, and nearing her 30th birthday, she dreams of changing it. She is an excellent baker with a fervent passion for making desserts. On Christmas Eve, Sam-soon gets dumped by her cheating boyfriend (Lee Kyu-han) and loses her job. One of the witnesses to her public humiliation is Hyun Jin-heon (Hyun Bin), the owner of upscale French restaurant Bon Appetit. Upon recognizing her talent, Jin-heon hires her as Bon Appetit's new pastry chef. From their first meeting, the two have an antagonistic relationship (she calls him the equally old-fashioned "Sam-shik"), and sparks fly.

Jin-heon is the son of a wealthy hotelier (Na Moon-hee), and his mother constantly nags him about succeeding her in the hotel business. She also keeps setting him up on matchmaking dates, saying his niece Mi-joo (Seo Ji-hee), who hasn't spoken a word since the childhood trauma of her parents' deaths, needs a mother figure. When Sam-soon finds herself in need of ₩50 million (approximately US$50,000) to prevent the foreclosure of her mother's house, Jin-heon proposes a deal: in exchange for the money, she agrees to become his pretend girlfriend. They draw up a complicated contract, of which the most important stipulation is that they should never fall in love for real. But as they spend more time together, Sam-soon and Jin-heon grow closer and gradually fall for each other. But just when things are going well, Jin-heon's ex-girlfriend Yoo Hee-jin (Jung Ryeo-won) returns from the United States.

Hee-jin had suddenly left Korea years ago, right after a car accident that had killed Jin-heon's older brother, his sister-in-law and a motorcyclist, and left Jin-heon (who was driving) seriously injured. Though Jin-heon's leg eventually recovered, emotional scars remained, a mixture of sorrow, guilt, and anger at Hee-jin's abandonment. But what he didn't know was that Hee-jin had been diagnosed at the time with stomach cancer, and she'd broken up with him because she didn't want to add to the tragedy he was already experiencing. Now in remission, she returns to Korea to ask for a second chance, followed by her Korean-American doctor Henry Kim (Daniel Henney), who is in love with Hee-jin and eager to learn his roots. Upon learning the truth, Jin-heon reconciles with Hee-jin.

Broken-hearted, Sam-soon resigns from Bon Appetit, and she and her older sister Yi-young (Lee Ah-hyun) decide to open an online pastry business using Yi-young's settlement from her recent divorce. Meanwhile, Jin-heon can't stop thinking about Sam-soon and realizes that he wants to be with her. After several run-ins in which he sabotages her blind date and immaturely invents reasons to see her, he finally confesses his love for Sam-soon. After a difficult break-up with Hee-jin, Jin-heon proves to Sam-soon's mother and sister that he's serious about her and the couple begin dating happily.

Then Hee-jin asks a final favor of Jin-heon, to accompany her back to the U.S. to rejoin her parents there. Sam-soon is initially resistant, but later gives her blessing when Jin-heon reassures her that this journey will be a form of closure for him and Hee-jin. He promises to return after one week. Sam-soon goes once again to the city clerk's office to have her name changed, but finally believing that her name is special and an important part of her identity, changes her mind at the last minute and tears up the papers.

Two months pass, with no calls or letters from Jin-heon, and Sam-soon has given up on him and gone on with her life.

When Jin-heon eventually returns to Korea, she gives him the cold shoulder. But the misunderstanding is cleared up when two months' worth of postcards gets delivered to Sam-soon's house; as they had been sent to the wrong address all this time. Jin-heon had spent the two months traveling and inspecting hotels all over America; in his desire to be a man worthy of Sam-soon, he is finally ready to take up the reins as his mother's heir. Whatever obstacles come their way (including his mother's continuing benign disapproval of their relationship), Sam-soon and Jin-heon decide to face the future together, doing their best at work and love, and living life to the fullest.

== Cast ==
=== Main ===
- Kim Sun-a – Kim Sam-soon, 30-year-old pastry chef
- Hyun Bin – Hyun Jin-heon, 27-year-old owner of Bon Appetit restaurant
- Jung Ryeo-won – Yoo Hee-jin, Jin-heon's ex-girlfriend
- Daniel Henney – Dr. Henry Kim, Hee-jin's doctor

=== Supporting ===
People around Sam-soon

- Maeng Bong-hak – Sam-soon's father
- Kim Ja-ok – Park Bong-sook, Sam-soon's mother
- Lee Ah-hyun – Kim Yi-young, Sam-soon's sister
- Lee Kyu-han – Min Hyun-woo, Sam-soon's ex-boyfriend

People around Jin-heon

- Na Moon-hee – Na Hyun-sook, Jin-heon's mother
- Kim Sung-kyum – Jin-heon's uncle
- Seo Ji-hee – Hyun Mi-joo, Jin-heon's niece
- Yoon Ye-hee – Yoon Hyun-sook, CEO Na's assistant

Restaurant staff

- Yeo Woon-kay – Ms. Oh, manager
- Kwon Hae-hyo – Lee Hyun-moo, chef
- Han Yeo-woon – Lee In-hye, Sam-soon's assistant
- Kim Hyun-jung – Jang Young-ja, dining room captain
- Kim Ki-bang – Ki-bang, kitchen assistant

Others

- Lee Yoon-mi – Jang Chae-ri
- Won Jong-rye – Chae-ri's mother

== Reception ==
Some critics believe its huge success was due to the show's focus on the life of a single woman in her late twenties. Particularly, the heroine's chubby physical appearance and frank, flawed yet lovable personality broke long-held Korean drama stereotypes, greatly increasing its popularity due to its resonance with many Koreans.

== Ratings ==
Ep.	Original broadcast date	Title	Average audience share			
Ep.	Original broadcast date	Title	Nielsen Korea		TNmS	
Ep.	Original broadcast date	Title	Nationwide	Seoul	Nationwide	Seoul
1	June 1, 2005	Life Is Like A Box Filled With Bonbon Au Chocolat	17.4%	17.8%	18.3%	19.2%
2	June 2, 2005	Shall We Try Dating?	22.9%	24.2%	21.3%	23.1%
3	June 8, 2005	How Does One Write A Love Contract?	28.5%	29.2%	27.8%	29.6%
4	June 9, 2005	Over The Rainbow	31.2%	32.1%	32.7%	30.8%
5	June 15, 2005	Love Is Supposed To Be Childish	35.3%	36.5%	35.4%	38.9%
6	June 16, 2005	The Calories Of A Kiss, The Calories Of Love	35.1%	36.1%	35.1%	38.2%
7	June 22, 2005	Madeleine, In Search Of Lost Time	35.0%	35.9%	35.6%	38.0%
8	June 23, 2005	Daddy, Why Is My Love Life So Hard?	37.7%	39.1%	37.7%	39.8%
9	June 29, 2005	You Played With My Heart As If It Were A Toy	37.4%	39.2%	40.7%	43.8%
10	June 30, 2005	My Name Is Kim Hee-jin	39.9%	40.3%	41.7%	43.5%
11	July 6, 2005	Don't Say It Was A Mistake. This Is The Second Kiss.	43.4%	44.7%	44.2%	46.2%
12	July 7, 2005	What's The Big Deal? I've Only Just Turned 30!	42.8%	44.0%	44.6%	46.5%
13	July 13, 2005	The Way To Break Up With Her	45.0%	46.8%	44.7%	46.9%
14	July 14, 2005	The Elements Of A Romance	44.0%	45.1%	44.1%	46.9%
15	July 20, 2005	The Rules Of Romance	46.0%	47.8%	47.9%	50.2%
16	July 21, 2005	Love Like You've Never Been Hurt Before	49.1%	51.1%	50.5%	53.4%
Average			36.9%	38.1%	37.6%	39.6%
In the table above, the blue numbers represent the lowest ratings and the red numbers represent the highest ratings.

== Original soundtrack ==
My Lovely Sam-soon Original Soundtrack

Soundtrack album
- Released: June 18, 2005 (South Korea)
- Genre: Soundtrack
- Label: UMG Korea

The My Lovely Sam-soon soundtrack was released on June 18, 2005. Korean electronica band Clazziquai contributed two songs to the soundtrack: "Be My Love" and "She Is", the former of which became the show's theme song. The show's popularity brought the group increased media and public attention.

My Lovely Sam-soon OST
No.	Title	Artist	Length
1.	"Bonbon O Chocolat I"		2:40
2.	"Be My Love"	Clazziquai	4:39
3.	"She Is"	Clazziquai	3:54
4.	"WFS"		2:26
5.	"Goodbye"	Jo Yong-won	4:33
6.	"Farewell Without Farewell"	Ji-sun from Loveholic	3:47
7.	"Bonbon O Chocolat II"		2:24
8.	"Goodbye II"		3:28
9.	"Can't Let Go of Love"	Just	3:53
10.	"Gravity"		2:14
11.	"Inside My Heart"	Kim Jung-eun	4:28
12.	"Be My Love (Inst.)"		4:47
13.	"She Is (Inst.)"		4:40
14.	"Bonbon O Chocolat III"		2:32

== Awards and nominations ==
Year	Award	Category	Recipient	Result
2005	Mnet Asian Music Awards	Best OST	"She Is" by Clazziquai	Won
2005	Grimae Awards	Best Actress	Kim Sun-a	Won
2005	MBC Drama Awards	Grand Prize (Daesang)	Kim Sun-a	Won
2005	MBC Drama Awards	Top Excellence Award, Actor	Hyun Bin	Won
2005	MBC Drama Awards	Top Excellence Award, Actress	Kim Sun-a	Won
2005	MBC Drama Awards	Excellence Award, Actress	Jung Ryeo-won	Won
2005	MBC Drama Awards	Best New Actor	Daniel Henney	Won
2005	MBC Drama Awards	Popularity Award, Actor	Hyun Bin	Won
2005	MBC Drama Awards	Popularity Award, Actor	Daniel Henney	Nominated
2005	MBC Drama Awards	Popularity Award, Actress	Kim Sun-a	Won
2005	MBC Drama Awards	Popularity Award, Actress	Jung Ryeo-won	Nominated
2005	MBC Drama Awards	Best Couple	Hyun Bin and Kim Sun-a	Won
2005	MBC Drama Awards	Best Couple	Daniel Henney and Jung Ryeo-won	Nominated
2006	Baeksang Arts Awards	Grand Prize (Daesang) for TV	My Lovely Sam-soon	Won
2006	Baeksang Arts Awards	Best Actress (TV)	Kim Sun-a	Nominated
2006	Baeksang Arts Awards	Best Screenplay (TV)	Kim Do-woo	Won
2006	1st Seoul International Drama Awards	Best Miniseries	My Lovely Sam-soon	Won
2006	1st Seoul International Drama Awards	Best Actress	Kim Sun-a	Nominated

== International broadcast ==
- The series first aired in Japan on cable channel KNTV from August 15 to October 4, 2005. Reruns followed on satellite channel Wowow beginning July 6, 2006 on Thursdays at 8 p.m., on the Fuji TV network as part of its Hallyu Alpha programming block beginning February 1, 2010, and on cable channel DATV.
- It first aired in the Philippines on the GMA Network from February to April 2006, during which it received a peak viewership rating of 40.2% and an average viewership rating of 34.9%, placing it among the top ten highest rated Asian dramas to air in the country. It was rebroadcast on GMA Network in 2009 and again in 2015.
- In Thailand, it first aired on ITV beginning September 23, 2006, with reruns on Channel 7 from August 11 to September 16, 2008.
- In Indonesia, it first aired on Indosiar beginning April 8, 2006, with reruns on antv from April 21 to May 27, 2007.
- In Israel, the series aired on Viva in 2007, becoming the first Korean drama to air there.
- In Sri Lanka, it began airing on Rupavahini dubbed in Sinhalese under the name Hithata Horen in September 2018.
- In Vietnam, it first aired on Hanoi Radio Television in July 9, 2006 and HTV9 in July 31, 2006.

== Stage adaptation ==
A stage adaptation (which was based more on the original novel than the TV series) ran at the Sangmyung Art Hall in Seoul from January 21 to September 25, 2011.

== Remakes ==
- A 2008 Philippine remake titled Ako si Kim Samsoon starred Regine Velasquez and Mark Anthony Fernandez.
- A 2020 Thailand remake titled My name is Busaba starred Namthip Jongrachatawiboon and Thanapat Kawila. It aired on One31 HD.
