= Spring Waltz (soundtrack) =

Soundtrack album by Various artists
- Released: March 28, 2006
- Genre: K-pop, dance
- Language: Korean
- Label: Seoul Records

Spring Waltz is the original soundtrack for the 2006 South Korean television series Spring Waltz.

== Track listing ==
Spring Waltz OST – Released March 28, 2006

1. "Teardrop Waltz" – Kim Hyeong-seok
2. "One Love" – Loveholic
3. "Childhood" – Praha
4. "Cannonball" – Damien Rice
5. "Clementine" – Lee Ji-soo
6. "Flower" – U-Na
7. "Spring Waltz" (봄의 왈츠) – Praha
8. "Spring Day of My Life" (내 인생의 봄날) – S.Jin
9. "A Sad Memory" – Jang Se-yong
10. "I Can Love Now" (이젠 사랑할 수 있어요) – Yurisangja
11. "Shadow Waltz" – Jang Se-yong
12. "Rainbow" (무지개) – Bada
13. "Song of Island" – Lee Ji-soo
14. "Guardian Angel" (수호천사) – S.Jin
15. "Flashback" – Kim Hyeong-seok
16. "A Song Calling to My Heart" (마음으로 부르는 노래) – Myung In-hee
17. "Tears for Remembrance" – Praha

Classic Spring Waltz – Released April 18, 2006

Disc one

1. "Spring Waltz" (봄의 왈츠) (Piano version) – Yiruma
2. "Day Dream" – Chong Park
3. "Sunday Afternoon Waltz" – Chong Park
4. "Dreaming Island's Story" (섬의 이야기) (Piano version) – Yiruma
5. "Lost in Island" (잃어버린 섬) (Piano version) – Yiruma
6. "A Sad Motive" – Chong Park
7. "Vivace – Broken Blossoms" – Yiruma
8. "Clementine 1 – To My Little Girl 1" – Yiruma
9. "I Think You Love Me" – Chong Park
10. "Before The Star" (별이 지기 전에) – Yiruma
11. "Dreaming Island's Story" (섬의 이야기) (Clarinet solo by Hee Jeong Lucia Kye) – Yiruma
12. "Autumn Colored Spring 1" (가을을 닮은 봄 1) (Guitar solo by Minseok Kim) – Yiruma
13. "Men's Tears" (Cello solo by Huh Yun Jung) – Chong Park
14. "Autumn Colored Spring 2" (가을을 닮은 봄 2) (Piano and guitar version) – Yiruma
15. "Lost In Island" (잃어버린 섬) (String version) (Cello by Huh Yun Jung) – Yiruma
16. "Silence" – Chong Park
17. "Neoui dwinmoseup" (너의 뒷모습) – Chong Park
18. "Clementine 2 – To My Little Girl 2" – Yiruma
19. "Guten Morgen" – Chong Park
20. "Spring Waltz" (봄의 왈츠) (H.I.S. String version) (Clarinet by Hee Jeong Lucia Kye) – Yiruma
21. "Clementine 3 – To My Little Girl 3" (Bonus track) – Yiruma
22. "Lost In Island" (잃어버린 섬) (Free version) (Bonus track) – Yiruma

Disc two

All tracks performed by Julius-Jeongwon Kim

1. Chopin Nocturne in C # minor (쇼팽 녹턴 C#단조)
2. Schumann Humoreske (슈만 유모레스크 도입부)
3. Chopin Waltz in B minor (쇼팽 왈츠 B단조)
4. Chopin Prelude in E minor, Op.28-4 (쇼팽 프렐류드 E단조 작품 28–4)
5. Chopin Etude in E major, op.10-3 (쇼팽 에튀드 E장조 작품 10–3 '이별의 노래')
6. Tchaikovsky 'Autumn Song' (차이콥스키 '가을의 노래')
7. Chopin Nocturne in E♭major, op.9-2 (쇼팽 녹턴 E♭장조 작품 9–2)
8. Chopin Etude in E♭minor, op.10-6 (쇼팽 에튀드 E♭단조 작품 10–6)
9. Chopin Prelude in D♭Major, op.28-15 (쇼팽 프렐류드 D♭장조 작품 28–15 '빗방울')
10. Tchaikovsky Nocturne in C♯ minor (차이콥스키 녹턴 C# 단조)
