= Horan (singer) =

South Korean singer and actress (born 1979)

Horan 최수진
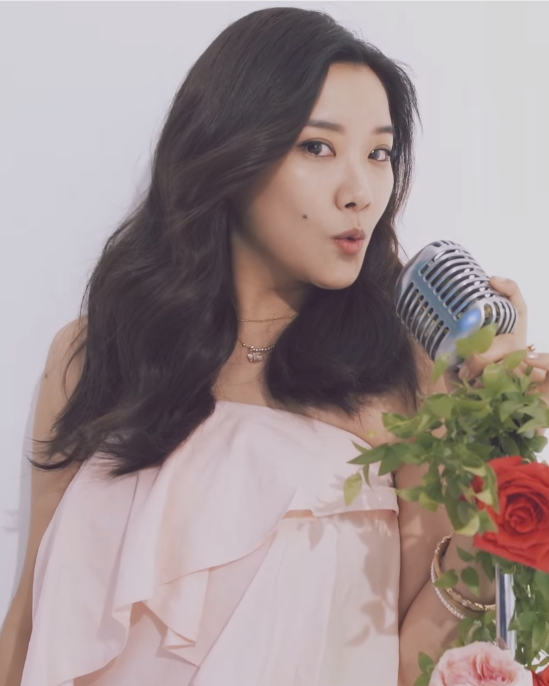
- Horan in a 2016 Marie Claire Korea photoshoot

Background information
- Born: Choi Soo-jin; July 5, 1979 (age 47); South Korea
- Genres: K-pop; J-pop; electropop; rock
- Occupations: Singer; actress
- Instrument: Vocals
- Years active: 2001–present
- Label: Fluxus Music

- Horan
- Hangul: 최수진
- Hanja: 崔蓚溱
- RR: Choe Sujin
- MR: Ch'oe Sujin

Stage name
- Hangul: 호란
- Hanja: 蝴瓓
- RR: Horan
- MR: Horan

Choi Soo-jin (Korean: 최수진; born July 5, 1979), better known by her stage name Horan (호란) is a South Korean singer and actress. She is the female vocalist of the South Korean electropop band Clazziquai that was formed in 2001 and debuted in 2004 with the album Instant Pig. She is also the vocalist of the rock band Ibadi.

== Biography ==
=== Early life ===
Horan was born in South Korea on July 5, 1979. She attended Yonsei University, where she studied French language and literature, and majored in psychology.

In July 2016, Horan revealed on SBS's The Genius Scouters that she had been bullied in high school.

=== Personal life ===
On March 30, 2013, at Seoul Gangnam Renaissance Hotel, Horan married an IT technician who she had dated in college. Fluxus announced that the couple had divorced in July 2016 after three years of marriage.

On September 29, 2016, at around 6 am, Horan rammed the driver of a cleaning truck on Seongsu Bridge in Seoul while on her way to host her daily morning radio show on SBS Power FM. The driver of the truck was taken to hospital for minor injuries, while Horan was booked by Seoul Gangnam Police without arrest on a DUI charge. Horan's blood-alcohol level was found to be 0.106 percent, high enough to have her driving license revoked. Horan had previously been booked for DUI charges in 2004 and 2007 making this her third. The case was sent to the Prosecutor in October. Fluxus released an official statement regarding the charge, apologising and halting all of Horan's activities. On January 9, 2017, Horan was fined ₩7 million ($5,800), taking into account Horan's out-of-court settlement with the injured truck driver.

== Discography ==
=== Extended plays ===
Title	Album details	Peak chart positions	Sales
Title	Album details	KOR	Sales
She's Alright	Released: May 19, 2015; Label: Fluxus Music, KT Music; Formats: CD, digital download; Track listing: 1. She's Alright (괜찮은 여자); 2. Celebrity (연예인); 3. Dancing Thru (댄싱쓰루); 4. Insomnia; 5. Favorite Nightmare; 6. Pollen (꽃가루)	21	KOR: 449+
Wonderland	Released: August 24, 2016; Label: Zihadahl, KT Music; Formats: CD, digital download; Track listing: 1. Tuna Mayo (참지마요); 2. Diving (다이빙); 3. Marie (마리); 4. Marie And Me (마리와 나); 5. Alice (앨리스); 6. Bye Bye Wonderland (바이바이 원더랜드)	47	—N/a

=== Singles ===
Title	Year	Peak chart positions	Sales	Album
Title	Year	KOR	Sales	Album
"She's Alright" (괜찮은 여자)	2015	—	—N/a	She's Alright
"Tuna Mayo" (참치마요)	2016	—	—N/a	Wonderland
"Marie And Me" (마리와 나)	2016	—	—N/a	Wonderland
"Alice" (앨리스)	2016	—	—N/a	Wonderland
"—" denotes releases that did not chart.

=== Collaborations ===
Year	Title	Other artist(s)
2008	"Dala Song"	Park Ki-young
2009	"Heart Disease" (심장병)	Outsider, MC Sniper
2016	"POOM" (품)	Ali

=== Soundtrack appearances ===
Year	Title	Album
2011	"Flowers Bloom" (꽃이 피네요) with Alex Chu	Only You OST
2012	"Maybe Maybe" (어쩌면 어쩌면) with Alex Chu	Music and Lyrics OST
2013	"I Love You"	One Warm Word OST
2014	"Lost Things" (잃어버린 것들)	Ghost-Seeing Detective Cheo-yong OST

== Filmography ==
=== Film ===
Year	Title	Role	Notes	Ref.
2005	April Snow	Herself	Cameo	
2011	Always		Cameo	
2014	Fashion King	Secretary	Cameo	

=== Drama ===
Year	Network	Title	Role	Notes	Ref.
2010	KBS 2	Call of the Country	Choi Eun-seo	Main character	
2011	MBC	The Greatest Love	Radio DJ	Cameo	
2014	MBC	Triangle	Jazz singer	Cameo	

=== Entertainment ===
Year	Network	Title	Role
2005	KBS	Power Interview	Panelist
2011	Mnet	Superstar K3	Preliminary judge
2016	JTBC	China Doll	Panelist

=== Radio ===
Year	Network	Title	Role
2006–2007	MBC FM4U	Music Street	DJ
2014	SBS Power FM	Horan Power FM	DJ
