= 02 (Urban Zakapa album) =

Studio album by Urban Zakapa
- Released: October 30, 2012
- Genres: R&B, ballad, K-Pop
- Labels: Fluxus Music; Universal Music

Urban Zakapa chronology
01 (2011)	02 (2012)	03 (2013)

02 is a studio album released by South Korean group Urban Zakapa. The lead single is "I Hate You" (Hangul: "니가 싫어"). "River" and "All The Same" ("똑같은 사랑 똑같은 이별") were pre-released. The album was nominated on 10th Korean Music Awards as Best R&B and Soul Album and licensed by Avex Taiwan as Taiwan exclusive version, same as 02.

== Track listing ==
No.	Title	Writer(s)	Length
1.	"Coincidence"	Soonil Kwon	3:59
2.	"Breeze"	Hyuna Jo, Soonil Kwon	3:08
3.	"I Still Believe"	Soonil Kwon	4:00
4.	"All The Same"	Soonil Kwon	3:55
5.	"Back In The Day"	Soonil Kwon, Hyuna Jo	3:48
6.	"No Love"	Hyuna Jo	4:28
7.	"Fly"	Yongin Park	3:46
8.	"June 14th"	Soonil Kwon	1:39
9.	"Emptiness"	Soonil Kwon	4:11
10.	"Home"	Hyuna Jo, Yongin Park	4:40
11.	"I Hate You"	Hyuna Jo	3:50
12.	"River"	Hyuna Jo	4:25

== Charts ==
Chart	Peak position
Gaon Weekly Albums Chart	1
Gaon Monthly Albums Chart	13

== Sales and certifications ==
Chart	Amount
Gaon physical sales	+7,857
