= 04 (Urban Zakapa album) =

Studio album by Urban Zakapa
- Released: November 4, 2014
- Genres: R&B, ballad, K-Pop
- Labels: Fluxus Music; KT Music

Urban Zakapa chronology
03 (2013)	04 (2014)

04 is the fourth studio album by South Korean trio, Urban Zakapa, consisting of 9 tracks. The album was released on November 4, 2014.

== Background and release ==
Fluxus Music announced the group's fourth studio album in October 2014, releasing a 36-second teaser video on October 30. A pre-released track titled "Consolation" had its music video released a day before the album, which was released on November 4. The album contains 9 tracks, including the song "Like A Bird" which was released in May as a single. The album's title track, "Self-hatred", also had its music video released on November 7. It features actor Goo Won.

"Consolation" and "Self-Hatred" ranked at 21 and 69 on the Gaon Singles Chart respectively on the first week of the album's release.

== Track listing ==
No.	Title	Length
1.	"Consolation" (위로; Wiro)	4:11
2.	"Self-hatred" (미운 나; Miun Na)	3:37
3.	"The Moment of Parting" (피아노 앞에서; Piano Apeseo)	4:13
4.	"Every Single Day" (매일 매일 매일; Maeil Maeil Maeil)	4:03
5.	"Play"	3:17
6.	"Like A Bird"	3:46
7.	"Starlight" (별; Byeol)	3:57
8.	"The Way of Let Me Go" (보내는 방법; Bonaeneun Bangbeop)	3:42
9.	"To Be a Grown Up" (어른이 되는 일; Eoreuni Doeneun Il)	3:01

== Charts ==
Chart	Peak position
Gaon Weekly Albums Chart	8
Gaon Monthly Albums Chart	25

== Sales and certifications ==
Chart	Amount
Gaon physical sales	2,925+
