= Urban Zakapa =

South Korean vocal group

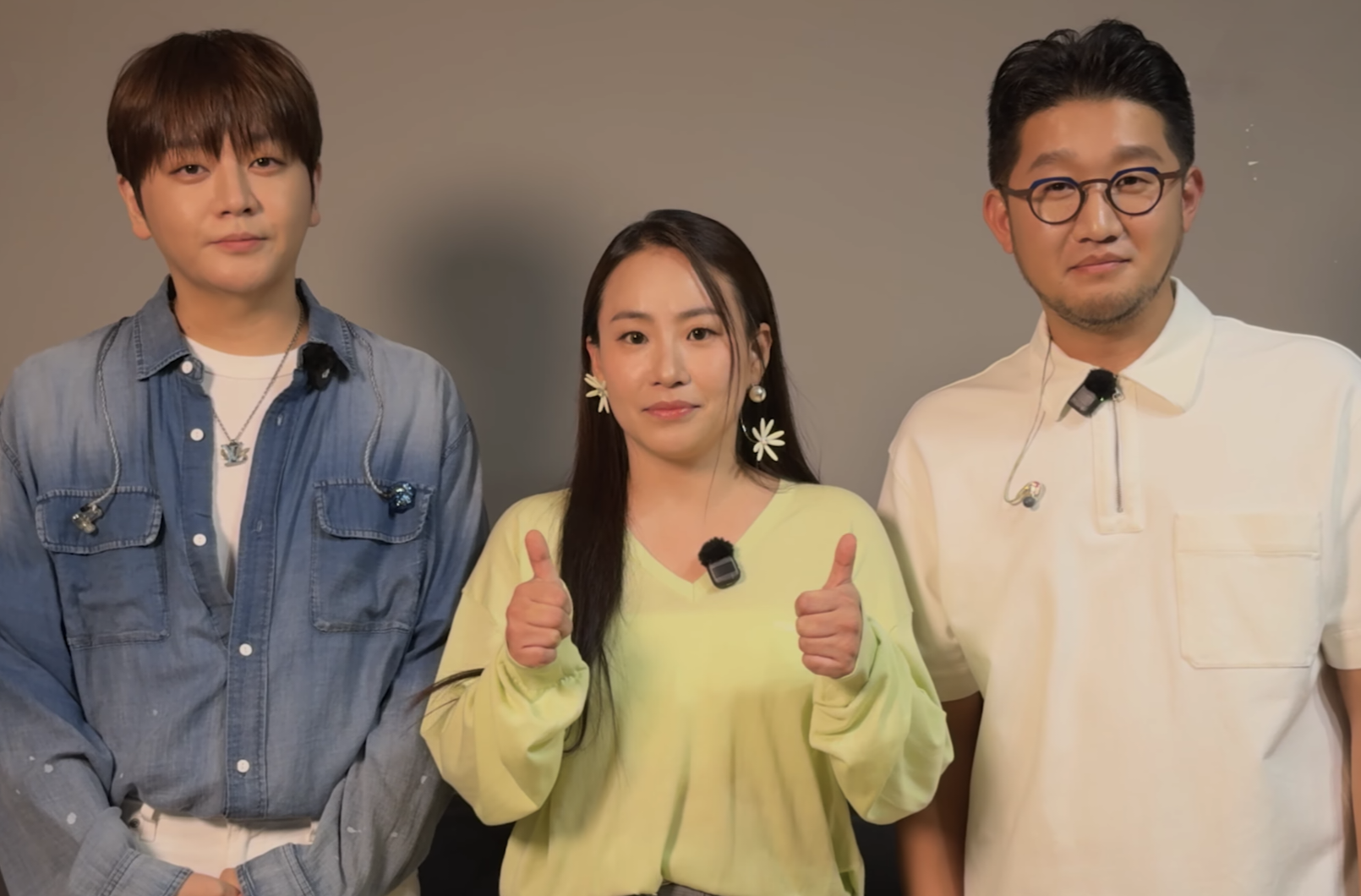
- Urban Zakapa in 2026; Left to right: Kwon Sun-il, Jo Hyun-ah and Park Yong-in

Background information
- Origin: Seoul, South Korea
- Genres: R&B; ballad; K-pop
- Years active: 2009–present
- Labels: Fluxus Music; Abyss Company
- Members: Park Yong-in; Jo Hyun-ah; Kwon Sun-il
- Past members: Choi Jae-man; Yoon Ji-min; Choi Yoon-jeong; Lee Ji-ho; Baek Ha Hyeong Ki; Han Tae-young

Urban Zakapa (Korean: 어반자카파; RR: Eobanjakapa) is a South Korean R&B singer-songwriter group formed in 2009 by Fluxus Music. Originally a 9-member group, in 2012 they became a trio, consisting of Park Yong-in, Jo Hyunah and Kwon Soon-il. The group's name is an abbreviation for Urban, Zappy, Kaleidoscopic, and Passionate.

== Background ==
In 2004, Park Yong-in met Jo Hyun-a at practical music academy. He asked her to form a singing duo. At first Jo Hyun-a's parents opposed that idea, but Hyun-a showed passion to music and was awarded 'MBC 별밤뽐내기'. Eventually, Hyun-a's parents decided to support their daughter.

Kwon Sun-il also dreamed of being a musician. His alumnus, Yong-in, suggested he join to make a trio.

Although the group debuted in 2009 as a nine-piece with four vocalists and five instrumentalists with the song "Café Latte (커피를 마시고)", there are currently only three vocalists due to artistic differences. Kwon Sun-il and his childhood friends, Jo Hyun-a and Park Yong-in write, compose and produce all of their own music.

Kwon won 1st place (singer) at S.M. Entertainment's first SM Youth Best contest and was a former SM Entertainment trainee with Super Junior and TVXQ. Park was part of the Korean R&B/Soul group Bluewind Soul with Han Won-jong, SG Wannabe's Lee Suk-hoon and others. Jo, the only female member of the group, was the vocalist of the hip-hop crew Overclass.

== Career ==
After releasing their first two EPs (Coffee, Sweety You) in 2009, the group released their first studio album titled 01 in 2011. In the same year, they released the single "Just A Feeling" which debuted at #59 on the Gaon Digital Chart and on December 6, they also released "Snowing" which debuted at #32.

Their third EP, Beautiful Day was released on April 3, 2012, and marks as the group's first album as a trio. "Beautiful Day" debuted at #41 on the Gaon Digital Chart. Months later, the group released their second studio album on October 30, titled 02. "I Hate You (니가 싫어)" was released on September 5 as a single and debuted at #9 on the Gaon Digital Chart, but was re-released with the album as its lead single. The album also had two other pre-released tracks, "River" and "All the Same (똑같은 사랑 똑같은 이별)". Both songs charted. 02 topped the Gaon Album Chart in its first week, and in January 2013, the album was nominated for Best R&B and Soul album at the 10th Korean Music Awards. "I Hate You (니가 싫어)" also earned the group two nominations at the 2012 Mnet Asian Music Awards, one for Song of the Year and another for Best Vocal Performance by a Group.

On February 12, 2013, Park and Kwon sang "Love Afternoon (사랑오후)" for the soundtrack of the KBS2 drama, Ad Genius Lee Tae-baek. In April, the group also released "Just a Little Bit (그냥 조금)" for the soundtrack of the tvN drama, Nine: Nine Time Travels. On December 3, the group released their 3rd studio album, 03. The album debuted at #11 on the Gaon Album Chart while its lead single, "Walk Backwards (거꾸로 걷는다)" debuted at #8 on the Gaon Digital Chart when it was released on October 23.

In 2014, Urban Zakapa made a comeback with the single "Like a Bird" on May 18. Park and Kwon also collaborated with SISTAR's Soyou for the single "The Space Between (틈)". The song was released on September 26. It debuted at #3 on the Gaon Singles Chart. On November 4, the group released their fourth album, 04, with the lead single, "Consolation" which also had its music video uploaded on the same day of the album's release. Urban Zakapa held their concert tour, Winter from November 22 until the end of 2014 in Seoul, Incheon, Daegu, Busan, Kwangju, Changwon, Seongnam, and Suwon.

On May 12, 2015, the group released the song "A Different You" for the OST of Let's Eat. On May 18, it was announced that Urban Zakapa were working on a mini album with rapper Beenzino. Their fourth extended play overall, UZ was released on May 28 with 5 tracks, including two singles, "Two One Two" and "Get (feat. Beenzino)" which was pre-released on May 22. "Get" debuted at #56 on the Gaon Singles Chart.

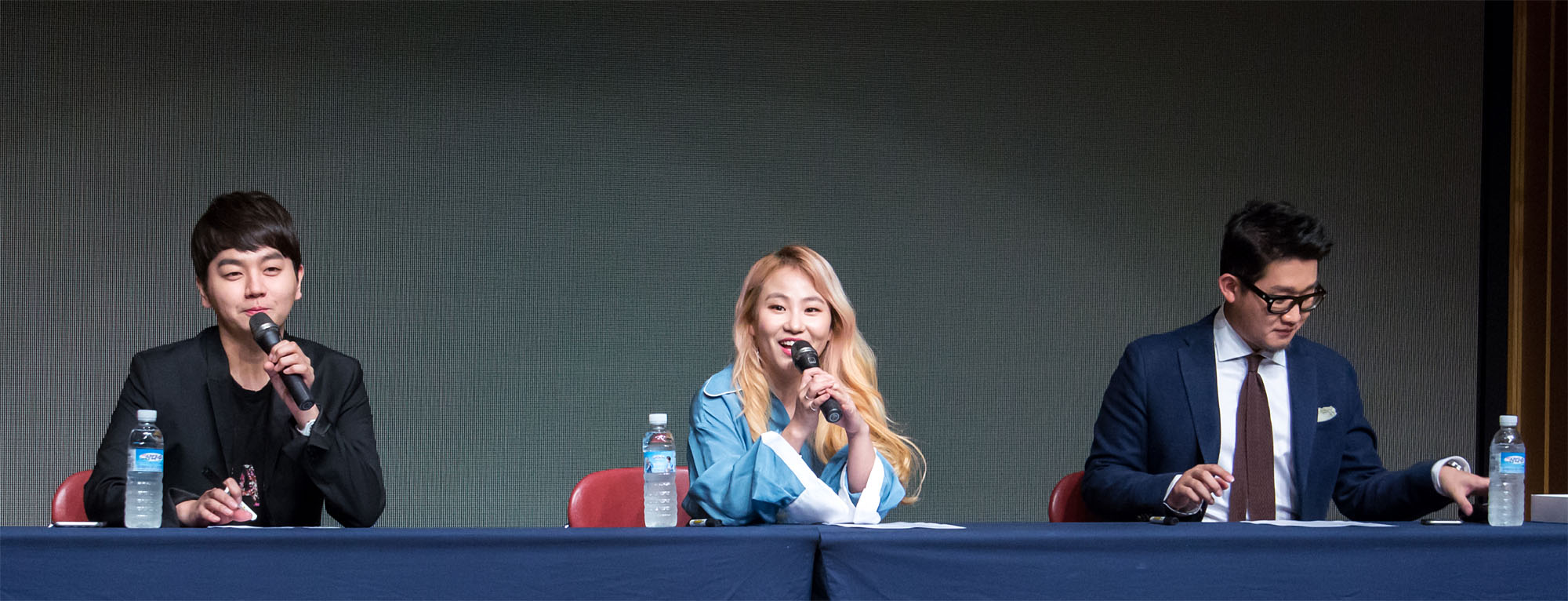
Urban Zakapa in 2016

On Feb 19, 2016, it was announced that Urban Zakapa had signed on to Makeus Entertainment since September 2015 and will be continuing their promotions for their upcoming album under the new company. On May 12, 2016, the group announced that they will be making their comeback on May 27, 2016 with their mini album 'Still'.

Urban Zakapa also made their comeback through a special live party that was made available through online broadcasting service Naver V App. The event scheduled for May 26 took place at Banyan Tree Seoul and was attended by special guests Suzy, Lee Sung Kyung, Im Seulong, Younha, Block B's P.O. and some of their other close friends.

On May 27, 2016, Urban Zakapa released their mini album with title track, "I Don't Love You (널 사랑하지 않아)". The music video starring actor Yoo Seung-ho and model Lee Ho Jung was uploaded on the same day. The title track was highly received by the public and managed to clinch 1st place on all 8 Korean music charts, achieving a perfect all-kill.

Urban Zakapa also held 3 Guerrilla Concerts at Myeongdong (May 29), Han River Yeouido (June 5) and Dong-A University in Busan (June 8) to thank their fans for supporting them, these were broadcast through Naver V App and their Facebook Page. The guerrilla concert held at Han River on June 5, 2016 had an estimated attendance of 4000 people. The group also held a commemorative mini album release concert on June 18 and June 19, 2016 at Seoul Olympic Park Stadium. In April 2017, the band were announced as one of the groups recruited by Seo Taiji for his Time:Traveler project, celebrating the 25th anniversary of his career. On July 11, they released their cover of the Seo song "Moai" from his 8th album, Atomos.

== Discography ==
- 01 (2011)
- 02 (2012)
- 03 (2013)
- 04 (2014)
- 05 (2018)

== Awards and nominations ==
Year	Organization	Category	Nominated work	Result
2012	14th Mnet Asian Music Awards	Song of the Year	"I Hate You"	Nominated
2012	14th Mnet Asian Music Awards	Best Vocal Performance by a Group	"I Hate You"	Nominated
2013	10th Korean Music Awards	Best R&B and Soul album	02	Nominated
2017	31st Golden Disk Awards	Digital Bonsang	"Don't Love You"	Won
2017	6th Gaon Chart Music Awards	Song Of The Month "May"	"Don't Love You"	Won
2018	7th Gaon Chart Music Awards	Song Of The Month "November"	"When We Were Two"	Nominated
2018	Korea Popular Music Award	Best R&B	"When We Were Two"	Won

== See also ==
- Clazziquai
