= Alex Chu =

South Korean-Canadian entertainer (born 1979)

Alex Chu 추헌곤
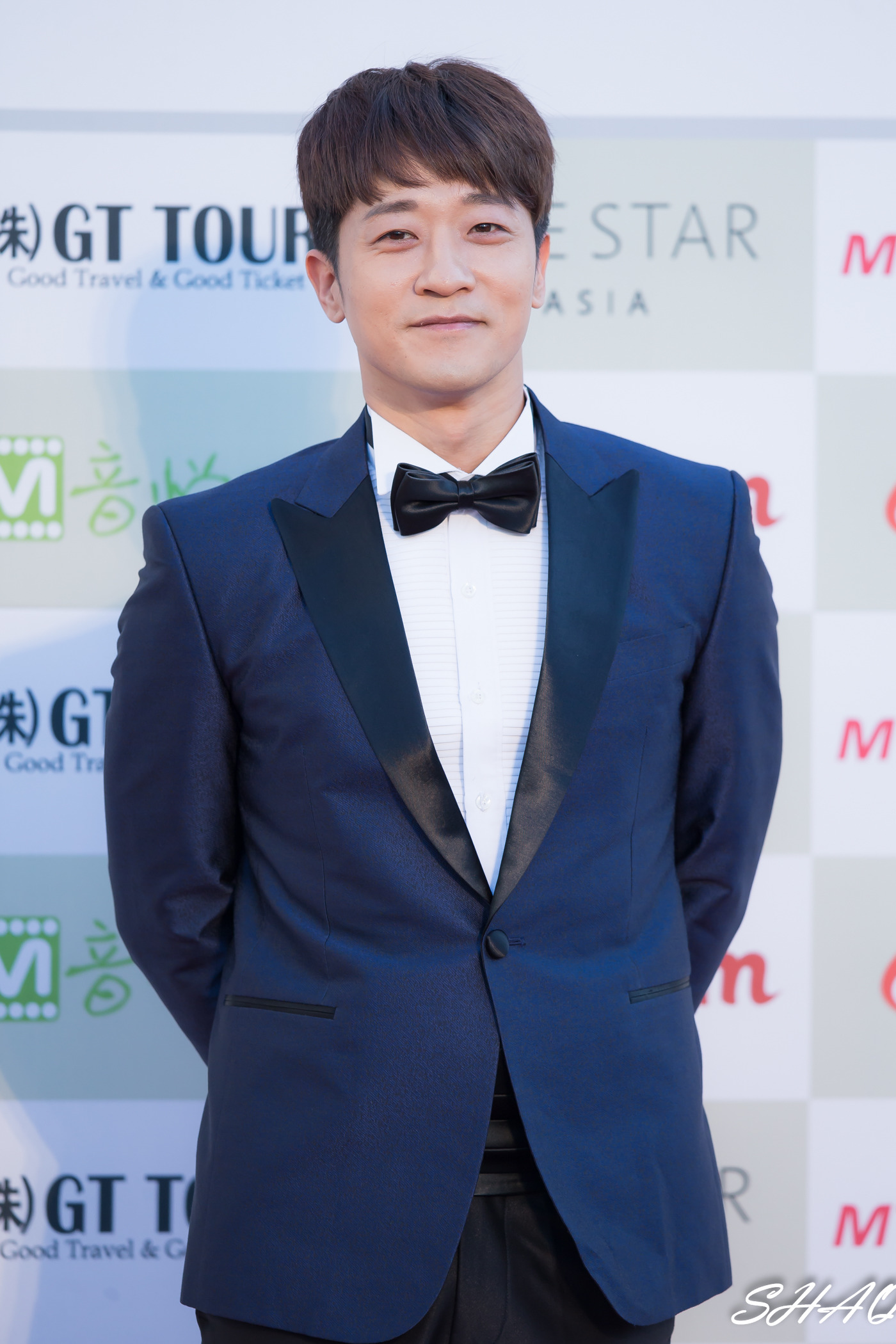
- Chu in 2016

Background information
- Born: Chu Hun-gon; September 2, 1979 (age 47); Vancouver, British Columbia, Canada
- Genres: K-pop; J-pop; electropop
- Occupations: Singer; actor
- Instruments: Vocals; piano
- Years active: 2001–present
- Label: Fluxus Music
- Spouse: Unknown (m. 2018; div. 2021)

Korean name
- Hangul: 추헌곤
- Hanja: 秋憲坤
- RR: Chu Heongon
- MR: Ch'u Hŏn'gon

Alex Chu (born September 2, 1979), known sometimes as Alex (Korean: 알렉스) and born Chu Hun-gon (추헌곤), is a Korean-Canadian singer and actor. He is the male vocalist of the South Korean electropop band Clazziquai.

== Biography ==
Having immigrated to Canada with his family, Alex rose to fame upon returning to South Korea years later as part of the group Clazziquai. The group's popularity skyrocketed after featuring on the soundtrack of hit drama series My Lovely Samsoon.

In 2008, the group announced a temporary hiatus, and its members debuted as solo artists, including Alex. In 2009, Clazziquai returned with the release of Mucho Punk.

Alex Chu became part of the MBC reality show We Got Married and was matched with Korean trot singer Jang Yoon-jeong in the Lunar Special episode, and actress/model Shin Ae for the rest of the series. The show also stars Crown J, Andy of Shinhwa, Seo In-young of Jewelry, Solbi of Typhoon, Saori and Jung Hyung-don. Alex and Shin Ae left the show after Episode 8 for Alex to record his first solo album Vintage Romance. They were replaced by Kim Hyun-joong of SS501 and Hwangbo of Chakra. However, due to popular demand, the couple reunited in Episode 13. Alex and Shin Ae made their exit from the show on November 16, 2008.

Alex debuted in his first drama series Pasta as one of the main cast. The drama aired from January 4, 2010 to March 9, 2010 on MBC.

On June 2, 2011, Alex released his second solo album, Just Like Me.

On June 1, 2012, Alex opened a new Italian restaurant, D'asti Plate, in January 2018 known as D'Asti NY. He partnered with three of his close friends to open the restaurant, which is located in the Shinsadong area of Seoul.

In 2013, he appeared in the KBS variety show Our Neighborhood Arts and Physical Education to participate during the bowling matches from episode 6 to episode 9.

In 2016, Alex started hosting a variety show My Neighbor, Charles.

== Personal life ==
Alex Chu was booked without detention by Gangnam Police in Seoul for driving while intoxicated in Seoul on July 18, 2012. Chu had blood alcohol content of 0.134%.

Chu married his non-celebrity girlfriend on January 27, 2018. On February 28, 2025, it was reported that the couple had decided to divorce four years ago.

== Discography ==
=== Studio albums ===
Title	Album details	Peak chart positions	Sales
Title	Album details	KOR	Sales
My Vintage Romance	Released: June 11, 2008; Label: Fluxus Music, Doremi Media; Formats: CD, digital download; Track listing: 1. Too Soon (어느새); 2. If It's You (그대라면); 3. Always You (넌 언제나) feat. Thomas Cook; 4. Sorry To Keep You Waiting (기다리게 해서 미안해요); 5. Tears Fall On Your Toes (발끝을 적시는 눈물); 6. Feel Like Making Sunshine; 7. Fold My Hands (깍지껴요) feat. Gaeko of Dynamic Duo; 8. Waltz Lesson feat. Whale; 9. Lover (연인); 10. I Love You (사랑하오); 11. Glorious Day (기분 좋은 날); 12. Daydreaming; 13. Miss. Understanding feat. Simon Dominic; 14. Daisy (데이지); 15. Flowerpot (화분)	—	—N/a
Just Like Me	Released: June 2, 2011; Label: Fluxus Music, Windmill Entertainment; Formats: CD, digital download; Track listing: 1. Who Told The Story (전하지 못한 이야기); 2. You're My Lady; 3. Same Dream (같은 꿈); 4. Wind Of Spring (봄날의 바람 같아요); 5. If You Can Go Back (되돌릴 수 있다면) feat. Jane; 6. Can't Be Crazy (미쳐보려 해도); 7. Talk (얘기); 8. He Did Not Receive His Blessings (자신에게도 축복받지 못한); 9. To Reach You (너에게 닿기를); 10. The Flowers (꽃이다); 11. Tomboi feat. Lovey; 12. Mediocre You (평범한 그대); 13. Again To You (또 다시 너에게로)	—	—N/a
"—" denotes releases that did not chart.

=== Singles ===
Title	Year	Peak chart positions	Sales	Album
Title	Year	KOR	Sales	Album
"I Love You" (사랑하오)	2008	—	—N/a	My Vintage Romance
"If It's You" (그대라면)	2008	—	—N/a	My Vintage Romance
"Bad Behavior" (나쁜 짓)	2008	—	—N/a	Non-album singles
"Sweet Dream (Andante)"	2010	67	—N/a	Non-album singles
"Same Dream" (같은 꿈)	2011	76	KOR: 136,091	Just Like Me
"Can't Be Crazy" (미쳐보려 해도)	2011	58	KOR: 188,215	Just Like Me
"Goodbye Smile" (웃으며 안녕)	2011	89	KOR: 90,881	Non-album singles
"You're So Gorgeous" (화려한 그대)	2011	85	KOR: 171,226	Non-album singles
"—" denotes releases that did not chart.

=== Collaborations ===
Year	Title	Other artist(s)
2006	"Very Heartbreaking Words" (너무 아픈 이 말)	Jisun of Loveholics
2013	"Blue Road" (블루로드)	Park Se-young

=== Soundtrack appearances ===
Year	Title	Album
2008	"Flowerpot" (화분)	We Got Married OST
2010	"Love Year" (사랑살이)	Three Brothers OST
2011	"If I Could Turn It Back" (되돌릴 수 있다면) feat. Jane	Late Autumn OST
2011	"Good Smile" (웃으며 안녕)	Romance Town OST
2011	"Flowers Bloom" (꽃이 피네요) with Horan	Only You OST
2011	"A Day You Left" (니가 떠난 하루)	Me Too, Flower! OST
2012	"Maybe Maybe" (어쩌면 어쩌면) with Horan	Music and Lyrics OST
2012	"If It Were Me" (나였으면)	I Do, I Do OST
2013	"One Step To Your Side" (한걸음 그대 곁으로)	Jjak OST
2014	"I Want To Love You" (사랑해줄래)	My Lovely Girl OST
2015	"D.N.A Luv" (연애세포) with Song Ji-eun	Flirty Boy And Girl OST
2015	"My Time Towards You" (널 향한 나의 시간)	Bubble Gum OST
2016	"Small Comma" (작은 쉼표)	Woman with a Suitcase OST

== Filmography ==
=== TV drama ===
Year	Title	Role
2007	Finding Love	Park Ji-won
2010	Smile, Dong-hae	Lee Tae-hoon
2010	Pasta	Kim San
2011	A Thousand Days' Promise	Son Suk-ho
2012	Salamander Guru and The Shadows	Ji-hoon
2013	Medical Top Team	Bae Sang-kyu
2014	I Need Romance 3	Lee Jung-ho
2014	Hotel King	Yoo Joon-seong
2014	My Lovely Girl	Bae Sung-jin
2018	I Am the Mother Too	Shin Sang-hyuk
2020	Once Again	Lee Jung-rok

=== Variety show ===
Year	Title	Role	Note
2009	We Got Married 1	Himself	
2011	Idol Star 7080 Best Singer	Contestant	Duet with Luna of f(x), won Gold Prize
2013	Our Neighborhood Arts and Physical Education	Himself	
2015	A Style For You	Himself	
