= Clazziquai Project =

South Korean electropop band

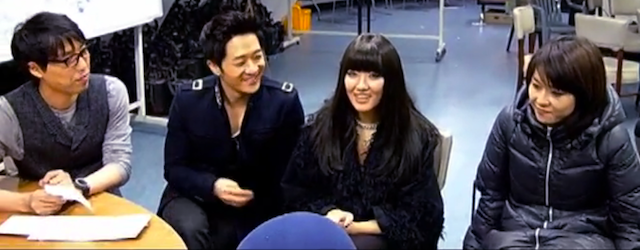
- Clazziquai Project in 2010; From left to right: DJ Clazzi, Alex, Horan and guest vocalist Christina Chu

Background information
- Origin: South Korea
- Genres: Electropop
- Years active: 2001–present
- Label: Fluxus Music
- Members: DJ Clazzi; Alex; Horan

Clazziquai Project (Korean: 클래지콰이), also known as Clazziquai, is a South Korean electropop band that combines several genres including electronic music, acid jazz and house. The band's first short unofficial albums were released online in 2001, spreading its music through words of "netizens," who positively received the band's music. They remained underground until the release of their first album Instant Pig in 2004, selling over 80,000 copies. Since then, their music has been used in shows, commercials, and films.

Clazziquai is known for their songs, "Be My Love" and "She Is", which were featured on the Korean drama My Lovely Samsoon, with the former becoming the show's theme song. The band won an award at the MNET KM Music Video Festival for "Best Soundtrack", and has also been the most nominated band at the Korean Popular Music Awards II(2회), winning "Artist of the Year" and "Best Pop". They have contributed to works by Japanese artists Fantastic Plastic Machine and M-Flo.

== History ==
=== 2001: Formation ===
DJ Clazzi, described as "a magician at synthesizing different sounds in music into creating one unique [sic] new genre". graduated from Capilano College, and continued his study at Centre for Digital Imaging and Sound (CDIS). After his graduation, he worked as a web designer, uploading his music online during his leisure time. DJ Clazzi's music became popular on Korean social media, with the experimental nature of his music being well received by Korean netizens, which is the reason why Clazziquai was initially labeled a "project group".

Korean-Canadian siblings Alex and Christina Chu were initially acquaintances with DJ Clazzi and participated vocally on the first three short and experimental albums released online, named gray, red, and retro.

Christina Chu left the official line up and Horan stepped in to fill her spot. Chu occasionally contributes her vocals to the band, although she is often an uncredited guest artist.

=== 2004–2006: Instant Pig and Color Your Soul ===
Clazziquai released their first studio album, Instant Pig, in May 2004, with 80,000 copies sold. The album received critical acclaim, which led to more than five songs from the album being used in six television commercials. The remixed English version of the song, "Come To Me", in its remix album Zbam was released in November 2004, and was later used as a song in a television commercial featuring David Beckham. Fantastic Plastic Machine praised Clazziquai as a new band to lead the "Hallyu".

In 2005, Clazziquai's "Be My Love" and "She Is", were featured in the South Korean hit television drama, My Lovely Samsoon. These two major theme songs also raised the ratings of the series up 50%. Clazziquai had hoped then that people's imagination towards their music would not 'decrease as a result of their unexpected popularity'. In September 2005, Clazziquai released their second album, Color Your Soul claiming it had a "raw, funkier feel presenting a combination of electronic music and [an] emphasized acoustic genre". A remix album entitled Pinch Your Soul was released early the following year.

=== 2007–2009: Love Child of the Century and Mucho Punk ===
In June 2007, Clazziquai's third album, Love Child of the Century, was released. A remix album, Robotica, was released later in the year. After the album's release, the members of Clazziquai grew busy with their own work, which started false rumors that Clazziquai could be disbanding.

In 2008, a video game for the PlayStation Portable featuring many Clazziquai songs titled DJMax Portable Clazziquai Edition was released. These songs were later released as part of the special album Metrotronics.

In July 2009, Clazziquai released their fourth album, Mucho Punk, featuring the single "Wizard of OZ" which had been featured in an LG commercial that year. In concordance to Mucho Punk, Clazziquai released Japanese album, Mucho Musica, and later released a remix album, Mucho Mix. The remix version of the original album was released in South Korea later in the year as Mucho Beat.

=== 2012–2018: Blessed, Blink and Travellers ===
In December 2012, Clazziquai released the single, "Can't Go On My Own", as part of the Can We Get Married? OST. In February 2013, the band released their fifth album, Blessed, making it into the top ten of Gaon's weekly album chart. They later held three 'Be Blessed' concerts throughout May and June.

In September 2014, Clazziquai released their sixth album, Blink. They held a concert shortly after the release to celebrate their tenth anniversary as a band. In mid 2015, they held a concert at the Understage in Seoul.

In September 2016, Clazziquai released their seventh album, Travellers. After the album's release the band held a concert at the Blue Square in Seoul.

=== 2019-present: Recent activities and CZQ ===
On September 10, 2019, the band released a brand new single called What If featuring Kim Soo-young. In the accompanying press release, it was mentioned that Clazziquai will continue the collaboration project with various singers starting with the respective single. Throughout 2023, seven new singles were released, summing up the CZQ album out on May 17, 2024. All songs feature guests on vocals, a first since the group's inception.

== Members ==
- DJ Clazzi (DJ 클래지) — Leader, composition, production, vocals
- Alex (알렉스) — Vocals
- Horan (호란) — Vocals

== Discography ==
=== Studio albums ===
Title	Album details	Peak chart positions			Sales
Title	Album details	KOR RIAK	KOR Gaon	JPN	Sales
Instant Pig	Released: May 14, 2004; Label: Fluxus Music, K&C Music; Formats: CD, cassette, digital download; Track listing: 1. You Never Know; 2. Come To Me (내게로 와); 3. Futuristic; 4. After Love; 5. Novabossa; 6. Sweety; 7. Stepping Out; 8. Tattoo; 9. I Will Never Cry; 10. Gentle Rain; 11. After Love II; 12. Flower; 13. Play Girl; 14. My Life; 15. Cat Bossa	13	—N/a	—	KOR: 84,105
Color Your Soul	Released: September 22, 2005; Label: Fluxus Music, K&C Music; Formats: CD, cassette, digital download; Track listing: 1. Beautiful Woman; 2. Salesman; 3. Fill This Night; 4. Cry Out Loud; 5. I Will Give You Everything; 6. Come Alive; 7. Date Line (날짜 변경선) feat. Lee Seung-yeol; 8. Be My Love; 9. Hold Your Tears (춤); 10. Color Your Soul; 11. Speechless; 12. Sunshine; 13. Steps Ahead; 14. Will I Ever Find... (다시...)	8	—N/a	94	KOR: 65,532
Love Child of the Century	Released: June 7, 2007; Label: Fluxus Music, K&C Music; Formats: CD, CD+DVD, digital download; Track listing: 1. Prayers; 2. Lover Boy; 3. Our Lives (생의 한가운데); 4. Session 1 – All Hail; 5. Gentle Giant; 6. Last Tango; 7. Fiesta (피에스타); 8. Next Love; 9. Romeo n Juliet; 10. Flower Children; 11. Session 2 : Confession; 12. Blues Friday Blues (금요일의); 13. Glory; 14. The Light (빛)	1	—N/a	72	KOR: 39,963
Mucho Punk	Released: July 14, 2009; Label: Fluxus Music, K&C Music; Formats: CD, digital download; Track listing: 1. Chocolate Truffles (초콜릿 트러플); 2. Kiss Kiss Kiss; 3. Love Again; 4. At the End of Love (사랑끝에); 5. Tell Yourself; 6. Back in Time; 7. Lazy Sunday Morning; 8. Take a Walk; 9. The Road; 10. Spinning the World; 11. Rapunzel (라푼젤); 12. Wizard Of OZ	—N/a	—N/a	—	
Blessed	Released: February 5, 2013; Label: Fluxus Music, K&C Music; Formats: CD, digital download; Track listing: 1. Blessed; 2. Sweetest Name; 3. Love Recipe (러브 레시피); 4. She is Great (그녀는 위대해); 5. Can't Go On My Own (함께라면) feat. Kim Jin-pyo; 6. Love Right; 7. I Will Be There For You (꽃잎같은 먼지가); 8. Brown Gold Eyes; 9. Like A Diamond; 10. Hollow and Shallow (사랑도 간다); 11. Player's Girlfriend (여전히)	—N/a	8	—	KOR: 6,269
Blink	Released: September 18, 2014; Label: Fluxus Music, KT Music; Formats: CD, digital download; Track listing: 1. Still I'm by Your Side (내게 돌아와); 2. Madly; 3. Crave You; 4. Android; 5. Maybe Baby; 6. Love Satellite; 7. Come on and Go with Me (그대 나와 같이); 8. Life etc.; 9. Call Me Back feat. Baechigi; 10. Think About You (습관처럼 생각이 나)	—N/a	16	—	KOR: 1,844
Travellers	Released: September 20, 2016; Label: Fluxus Music, K&C Music; Formats: CD, digital download; Track listing: 1. Travellers (Inst.); 2. Dangerous; 3. I'm Curious (#궁금해); 4. Sweet Life; 5. Speak of Love (걱정남녀); 6. Make Up Break Up; 7. Night Flight (야간비행); 8. Sleepless Night (잠 못드는 밤); 9. Sweetie Fruity Jelly; 10. Aurora	—N/a	16	—	KOR: 1,236
CZQ	Released: May 17, 2024; Label: A2Z Entertainment; Formats: LP, digital download; Track listing: 1. Beautiful Thing feat. Jaeyeon, Kim Suyoung; 2. Baby feat. Jaeyeon, Lim Sejoo; 3. Static feat. Jaeman, Kei; 4. Lost Highway feat. Jin Hyeojeong, Wilcox; 5. My Girl feat. Kwon Soon Il; 6. Tonight feat. It's, Park Sol; 7. World feat. Yeham, Yu Seung Woo	—	—	—	
"—" denotes releases that did not chart.

=== Remix albums ===
Title	Album details
Zbam	Released: November 25, 2004; Label: Fluxus Music, K&C Music; Formats: CD, digital download; Track listing: 1. Oh Yes (Drum Bon Remix); 2. Futuristic (House Remix); 3. Come To Me (Mellotron Remix); 4. She Loves You; 5. Stepping Out (Step Remix); 6. You Never Know (Soft Remix); 7. Snatcher; 8. Coming At Me To Disco (Rocking Remix); 9. After Love (Female Version); 10. Skyscraper; 11. Come To Me (Mellotron Remix (Radio Edit))
Pinch Your Soul	Released: March 9, 2006; Label: Fluxus Music, K&C Music; Formats: CD, digital download; Track listing: 1. Color Your Soul (Pinch Your Remix); 2. Love Mode feat. Tablo; 3. Date Line (날짜변경선); 4. Fill This Night (Paradox Remix); 5. Come Alive (Distort Remix); 6. I'll Give You Everything (Buoyant Remix) feat. J & Bobby Kim; 7. Speechless (Vanilla Soul Remix); 8. Cry Out Loud (Black Sunshine); 9. Sweety (Cosmo Remix); 10. Chi Chi (Remix); 11. Farewell (이별) (2005 Memorial Music Festival)
Robotica	Released: December 11, 2007; Label: Fluxus Music, K&C Music; Formats: CD, digital download; Track listing: 1. Freedom; 2. Iconic Love; 3. Robotica; 4. You; 5. Why; 6. Beautiful Stranger; 7. Love Mode (Hwa Remix) feat. VERBAL; 8. Prayers (Shinichi Osawa Remix); 9. Our Lives (FPM Hyper Society Remix); 10. Fiesta (Daishi Dance Remix); 11. Lover boy (As Pap As Pop Remix); 12. Next Love (DJ Kayip Remix); 13. Love mode (PQZ Remix) feat. PE’Z & VERBAL
Mucho Beat	Released: November 26, 2009; Label: Fluxus Music, K&C Music; Formats: CD, digital download; Track listing: 1. Ping (핑); 2. La La La; 3. Affection (집착); 4. Spinning the World (Voice Remix); 5. Tell Yourself (Daishi Dance Remix); 6. Chocolate Truffles (초콜릿 트러플); 7. Love Again (Ram Rider Remix); 8. Kiss Kiss Kiss (Nakata Remix); 9. Back in Time (Cloud Remix); 10. Flea (Jojal Remix Audition Grandprix); 11. The Road (Sugiurumn Remix)

=== Special albums ===
Title	Album details	Peak chart positions
Title	Album details	JPN
Love Mode	Released: August 16, 2006 (JPN); Label: Fluxus Music, Avex; Formats: CD, digital download	112
Beat in Love	Released: August 13, 2008 (JPN); Label: Fluxus Music, Rhythm Republic; Formats: CD, digital download	188
Metrotronics with DJMAX	Released: October 23, 2008 (KOR); Label: Fluxus Music, K&C Music; Formats: CD, digital download	—N/a
Mucho Musica	Released: July 1, 2009 (JPN); Label: Fluxus Music, Universal Music Japan; Formats: CD, digital download	158
Mucho Mix	Released: October 28, 2009 (JPN); Label: Fluxus Music, Universal Music Japan; Formats: CD, digital download	—
Taiwan Special Best Of Album 2013	Released: October 23, 2013 (TWN); Label: Fluxus Music, Avex Taiwan; Formats: CD, digital download	—N/a
"—" denotes releases that did not chart.

=== Singles ===
Title	Year	Peak chart positions	Sales	Album
Title	Year	KOR	Sales	Album
"Sweety"	2004	—N/a	—N/a	Instant Pig
"Come to Me"	2004	—N/a	—N/a	Zbam
"Fill This Night"	2005	—N/a	—N/a	Color Your Soul
"Hold Your Tears" (춤)	2005	—N/a	—N/a	Color Your Soul
"Love Mode" feat. Tablo	2006	—N/a	—N/a	Pinch Your Soul
"Lover Boy"	2007	—N/a	—N/a	Love Child of the Century
"Robotica"	2007	—N/a	—N/a	Robotica
"Flea"	2008	—N/a	—N/a	Metrotronics
"Wizard Of OZ"	2009	—N/a	—N/a	Mucho Punk
"Love Again"	2009	—N/a	—N/a	Mucho Punk
"Ping" (핑)	2009	—N/a	—N/a	Mucho Beat
"Can't Go On My Own" (함께라면) feat. Kim Jin-pyo	2012	36	KOR: 218,809+	Blessed
"Sweetest Name"	2013	38	KOR: 157,564+	Blessed
"Love Recipe" (러브 레시피)	2013	24	KOR: 312,448+	Blessed
"Love Satellite"	2014	52	KOR: 77,041+	Blink
"Madly"	2014	84	KOR: 42,310+	Blink
"Still I'm by Your Side" (내게 돌아와)	2014	—	KOR: 19,027+	Blink
"I'm Curious" (#궁금해)	2016	—	—N/a	Travellers
"Speak of Love" (걱정남녀)	2016	—	—N/a	Travellers
"What If" (feat. 김수영)	2019	—	—N/a	—N/a
"Take Back" (feat. 홍다혜)	2019	—	—N/a	—N/a
"Beautiful Thing" (feat. Jaeyeon and Kim Suyoung)	2023	—	—N/a	—N/a
"Baby" (feat. 재연 and 임세주)	2023	—	—N/a	—N/a
"Static" (feat. JAEMAN and Kei)	2023	—		—N/a
"Lost Highway" (feat. 윌콕스 and 진효정)	2023	—		—N/a
"—" denotes releases that did not chart.

=== Soundtrack appearances ===
Year	Title	Album
2003	"Play Girl"	Good People OST
2004	"Nova Bossa"	Chocolate Post Office OST
2004	"By The Sea" (바다로)	Heong-bu Hurt His Head OST
2005	"Be My Love"	My Lovely Sam Soon OST
2005	"She Is"	My Lovely Sam Soon OST
2005	"Stepping Out"	April Snow OST
2009	"Wizard of OZ"	LGT 'OZ' CF
2010	"Lazy Sunday Morning"	Le Petit Nicolas OST
2012	"Can't Go On My Own" (함께라면)	Can We Get Married? OST

== Awards and nominations ==
Years	Awards
2005	Korean Music Awards: "Artist of the Year"; Korean Music Awards: "Best Pop"

=== Mnet Asian Music Awards ===
Year	Category	Work	Result
2004	Best New Group Video	"Sweety"	Nominated
2005	Best Mixed Group	"Fill This Night"	Nominated
2005	Best OST	"She Is..." (My Lovely Sam Soon)	Won
2007	Best House & Electronic	"Lover Boy"	Won
2007	Best Mixed Group	"Lover Boy"	Won
2009	Best House & Electronic	"Love Again"	Nominated
2009	Best Mixed Gender Group	"Love Again"	Nominated
