= Fluxus Music =

Independent record label based in South Korea

- Founded: 2002
- Founder: Kim Byung-chan (Chan Kim)
- Distributor(s): KT Music; LOEN Entertainment (Former); Warner Music Group (Former); CJ E&M Music (Former); Universal Music Group (Former)
- Genre: Various
- Country of origin: South Korea
- Location: Seoul
- Official website: FluxusMusic.com

Fluxus Music is an independent record label based in South Korea.

== History ==
It was formed in 2002 by Kim Byung-chan (also known as Chan Kim) (an alumnus of the Berklee College of Music), who worked as a sound engineer, opened Nanjang Communications and acted directly as a musician at Korean rock band Boohwal and the United States local band Out of the Blue. Putting all his experiences and know-hows accumulated from being an artist, producer and engineer he stood independently from Nanjang Communication and established Fluxus Music.

The label took its name from Fluxus, the avant-garde art movement of the 1960s, for show the aim for music that always flow with the change that never stagnant.

== Trivia ==
Fluxus Music is evaluated as one of the Korean record labels that make music well mixed with musicality and commercialism from South Korea's music scene. Actually all its artists are self-producing musicians who are also singers-song writers. As a representative label in South Korea music scene from 2000s, it found success with musicians of various genres such as Clazziquai, Yi Sung-yol and Urban Zakapa.

Fluxus Music was also awarded eight times in the Korean Music Awards including its 1st 'Record Label of the Year', the most record for a label.

Fluxus Music also owns a sub-label called 'Interplay'.

== Artists ==
=== Present ===
Fluxus Music

- Clazziquai (Clazziquai Project)
- Yi Sung-yol
- W & Jas
- Bye Bye Sea (Annyeong Bada)
- Eastern Sidekick
- From the Airport
- Loveholics
- Handsome People
- Yang Jin-suk
- Kim Hyo-yeon

Interplay

- Small O
- Ibadi
- Ggotjam Project
- Choi Woo-joon (Saza Choi)

=== Former ===
- W & Whale
- Winterplay (now under Loudpigs Music)
- My Aunt Mary
- Lee Seung-hwan (now under Dream Factory)
- Hong Jin-kyung
- Park Ki-young
- Alex Chu (now under SI Entertainment but still a Clazziquai member)
- Tei (now under Kiroy Company)
- Urban Zakapa (now under Abyss Company)
