= Tablo discography =

This is the discography of South Korean-Canadian rapper, songwriter, record producer Tablo. His debut solo album, Fever's End, was released in 2011.

== Extended plays ==
Title	EP details	Peak positions				Sales
Title	EP details	KOR	TW	US Heat.	US World	Sales
Fever's End: Part 1	Released: October 21, 2011; Label: YG Entertainment; Formats: CD, digital download; Language: Korean; Track list: 1. "Home" (featuring Lee So-ra; 집); 2. "Bad" (featuring Jin-shil; 나쁘다); 3. "Airbag" (featuring Naul); 4. "The Tide" (scratch by DJ Fritz; 밀물); 5. "From the Bottom" (featuring Bumkey; 밑바닥에서)	12	7	—	4	KOR: 11,099+
Fever's End: Part 2	Released: November 1, 2011; Label: YG Entertainment; Formats: CD, digital download; Language: Korean / English; Track list: 1. "Tomorrow" (featuring Taeyang); 2. "The Source" (scratch by DJ Tukutz; 출처); 3. "Dear TV" (해열); 4. "Thankful Breath" (featuring Yankee + Bong Tae-kyu; 고마운 숨); 5. "Expiration Date" (유통기한)	13	7	21	2	KOR: 11,099+
"—" denotes releases that did not chart or were not released in that region.

== Singles ==
=== As lead artist ===
Title	Year	Peak positions				Sales	Albums
Title	Year	KOR	KOR Hot	US World	WW	Sales	Albums
"Rhapsody of Rain"	2005	*	*	—	*	—	Non-album single
"Airbag" (featuring Naul of Brown Eyed Soul)	2011	4	5	10	*	KOR: 1,558,339+	Fever's End: Part 1
"Bad" (나쁘다) (featuring Jinsil)	2011	3	4	7	*	KOR: 1,609,372+	Fever's End: Part 1
"Tomorrow" (featuring Taeyang)	2011	2	3	—	*	KOR: 1,477,349+	Fever's End: Part 2
"Hood" (with Joey Badass)	2015	—	—	9	*		Non-album singles
"Dododo" (with Jinsil)	2016	—	—	—	*		Non-album singles
"Cave Me In" (with Gallant and Eric Nam)	2017	—	—	—	*		Non-album singles
"Stop the Rain" (with RM)	2025	—	*	—	178		Non-album singles
"—" denotes releases that did not chart or were not released in that region. "*" denotes a chart did not exist at that time.

==== Promotional singles ====
Title	Year	Peak positions	Albums
Title	Year	KOR	Albums
"Talk Play Love" (Tablo, BoA, Xiah Jun-su and Jin Bo-ra)	2007	1	AnyBand
"Promise U" (Tablo, BoA, Xiah Jun-su and Jin Bo-ra)	2007	3	AnyBand
"Daydream" (Tablo, BoA, Xiah Jun-su and Jin Bo-ra)	2007	10	AnyBand

=== As featured artist ===
Title	Year	Peak positions	Albums
Title	Year	KOR	Albums
"I'm Coming" (Rain featuring Tablo)	2006	1	Rain's World
"Rainbow" (Infinite Flow featuring Tablo and JW)	2006	4	More Than Music
"I Love You" (Navi featuring Tablo)	2008	1	I Love You
"Up All Night" (밤샘) (Lee Hi featuring Tablo)	2016	42	Seoulite
"Auto Reverse" (Psy featuring Tablo)	2017	30	4x2=8

== Other charted songs ==
Title	Year	Peak positions	Sales	Album
Title	Year	KOR	Sales	Album
"Home" (집) (featuring Lee So-ra)	2011	22	KOR: 529,042+	Fever's End: Part 1
"From the Bottom" (featuring Bumkey)	2011	34	KOR: 409,378+	Fever's End: Part 1
"The Tide" (밀물) (scratch by DJ Fritz)	2011	51	KOR: 428,856+	Fever's End: Part 1
"Thankful Breath" (featuring Yankee + Bong Tae-kyu)	2011	33	KOR: 286,967+	Fever's End: Part 2
"The Source" (출처) (Scratch By DJ Tukutz)	2011	54	KOR: 160,907+	Fever's End: Part 2
"Expiration Date" (유통기한)	2011	56	KOR: 153,826+	Fever's End: Part 2
"Dear TV / 해열"	2011	62	KOR: 139,002+	Fever's End: Part 2

== Guest appearances ==
Title	Year	Other performer(s)	Album
"New Joint (Remix)"	2002	DJ Honda, PMD	Underground Connection
"Sky High"	2004	—	Nonstop: Season 4 Soundtrack
"실례합니다 (Excuse Me)"	2004	Dynamic Duo, DJ Wrecks	Taxi Driver
"Let Me Love You"	2005	Lee Min-woo	IInd Winds
"The City"	2005	Lena Park	—
"Love Mode"	2006	Clazziquai	Pinch Your Soul
"Cha Ryut!"	2006	TBNY, Dynamic Duo	Masquerade
"School of Hip-hop"	2006	Gaknaguene, Garion	Green Tour
"Never Know"	2006	Lim Jeong-hee	Thanks
"Somnolency"	2006	Bobby Kim	Follow Your Soul
"The 'M' Style"	2007	Lee Min-woo	Explore M
"It's All Over Anyway"	2007	Kang Kyun-sung	A Path of Love
"Downhill"	2007	Verbal Jint, Mithra Jin	Favorite
"Alive"	2008	Pe2ny, Yankie	Alive Soul Cuts Vol. 1
"Memory (Rap Mix)"	2008	Younha	Someday
"Keep Pushin'"	2009	Kero One	E.B. Korean Sessions
"When the Sunshine Comes"	2009	Kero One, Mithra Jin	E.B. Korean Sessions
"Smiles & Crys"	2010	Dok2, Willy Lee	Thunderground Mixtape Vol.2
"Asian Kids"	2010	Kero One, MYK, Dumbfoundead	Kinetic World
"이놈 (I.N.D.O)"	2013	Yankie	—
"Lovestrong"	2013	Saltnpaper	Saltnpaper Mini Album
"꽃 (Flower)"	2015	XIA	Flower
"Sold Out"	2015	Yankie, Zion.T, Loco	Andre
"Fire Water"	2017	Code Kunst, G.Soul	Muggles' Mansion
"Stay"	2021	B.I	Waterfall
"U"	2024	Stray Kids	Hop

== Produced songs ==
- 2004: "이력서" (Dynamic Duo)
- 2004: "Sky High" (Nonstop 4 soundtrack)
- 2005: "Campus Love Story" (Cho PD)
- 2006: "내일은 오니까" (Paloalto & The Quiett)
- 2006: "남자라서 웃어요" (Kim Jang Hoon featuring Mithra Jin)
- 2006: "Never Know" (by Lim Jeong Hee)
- 2006: "Rain Bow" (Infinity Flow)
- 2007: "여자라서 웃어요" (Sim Soo-bong featuring Mithra Jin)
- 2007: "Talk Play Love" (Anyband)
- 2012: "Style" (Rania)
- 2013: "Turn it up" (Lee Hi)
- 2013: "Special" (Lee Hi)
- 2013: "Fool" (Lee Hi)
- 2014: "Rise" (Taeyang)
- 2014: "Let go" (Taeyang)
- 2014: "Love you to death" (Taeyang)
- 2015: "Daydream" (INFINITE 's Sunggyu featuring Borderline: Tablo & Nell's Kim Jong-wan)
- 2016: "Hashtag" (Younha)
- 2016: "Three words" (Sechskies)
- 2016: "Couple" (Sechskies) (uncredited)
- 2016: "Up All Night" (Lee Hi featuring Tablo)
- 2016: "Blues" (Lee Hi)
- 2016: "Missing You" (Lee Hi)
- 2016: "You" (Winner's Seungyoon)
- 2017: "Sad Song" (Sechskies)
- 2017: "Be Well" (Sechskies)
- 2017: "Drinking Problem" (Sechskies)
- 2018: "Hug Me" (iKON)
- 2019: "Song Request" Lee So-ra featuring Suga
