= Anycall =

South Korean mobile phone brand

- Manufacturer: Samsung Electronics
- First released: 1993
- Discontinued: 2011
- Successor: Samsung Galaxy

Anycall (Korean: 애니콜) was a South Korean mobile phone brand established by Samsung Electronics in 1993. It was once the most popular mobile phone brand in the country, having been the leader since 1995. Samsung mobile phones were sold through the Anycall brand in South Korea and the greater China region prior to 2011. The brand was eventually retired during the 2010s when it only remained in use for feature phones.

Like other mobile phone brands in South Korea, they provided technology such as cameras, internet access, and digital TV through Digital Multimedia Broadcasting.

== Products ==
In 2009, Anycall launched their Magic Hole line, which had a colour-customizable circular display. It came in three colours: Candy Pink, Sapphire Blue, and White Silver. It was intended to appeal to a younger audience, and various television commercials were aired for it starring well-known actors and K-pop artists, such as the actor Lee Min-ho, Kim Hyun-joong from the boy band SS501, and Uee from the girl group After School.

== Spokeswoman ==
Lee Hyori was the spokeswoman for Anycall beginning in 2003. During this period, she starred in Anycall produced music videos such as "Anymotion", which features Anycall SCH-V600 by Lee Hyori Phone. In 2005, Hyori Lee starred in "Anyclub", a follow-up to the smash hit "Anymotion". In December 2006, she starred in a third installment, labeled "Anystar". The first music video starred Lee Hyori along with Eric Mun, while the second and third installment starred Kwon Sang-woo and Lee Joon-gi respectively.

Another ad with Hyori in 2005 featured Jo Myung-Ae, a North Korean dancer. The advertisement, filmed in China, was the first time a North Korean appeared in a South Korean advertisement.

Following the expiration of Hyori's contract with Samsung in November 2007, K-pop stars such as BoA, Kim Junsu, Tablo, and Jin Bora collaborated to produce "Anyband", which featured three combined music videos for songs "Talk, Play Love", "Promise U", and "Day Dream" in a seven-minute commercial. The temporary band also held concerts for fans.

In 2008, K-pop groups DBSK & Girls' Generation collaborated on a music video to promote the Samsung Anycall Haptic.

In 2009, Shinee released the digital single "Bodyguard" to promote the cell phone. The music video and CF for the song featured the popular on-screen couple So Yi-jung (Kim Bum) and Chu Ga-eul (Kim So-eun) from the popular KBS romantic drama series Boys Over Flowers. The same year Son Dam-bi and girl group After School teamed up for the digital single Amoled. After School then replaced Son Dambi as the new spokes models for the brand.

in 2010, a South Korean girl group Miss A released the song "Love Again", whose music video promoted the Samsung Beat Festival. The video also prominently featured an Anycall phone.

In 2011, IU became the spokeswoman.

== Spokespersons ==
- Lee Hyori (longest full year exclusive contract model)
- Kim Hyun-joong
- Go Ara
- Jung Il-woo
- Lee Joon-gi
- Jun Ji-hyun
- Lee Seo-jin
- Lee Seaou-loung
- Yoon So-yi
- Cha Tae-hyun
- Jang Hyuk
- Lee Na-young
- Jo Myung-Ae
- Moon Geun-young (licensed by KTF)
- Ahn Sung-ki (licensed by KTF)
- Park Jung-ah
- Choi Soo-young
- Seven (licensed by LG Telecom)
- Eric, member of Shinhwa)
- Han Sang-woo Mindy's own
- Kwon Sang-woo
- Anyband (formed by Samsung Anycall itself): BoA, Kim Junsu of TVXQ, Tablo of Epik High and jazz pianist Jin Bora
- Rain
- Victoria Song
- TVXQ and Girls' Generation (Haptic Motion CF)
- Kim Bum, Kim So-eun, and SHINee (Bodyguard CF)
- Kim Joon
- Kim Hyun-joong
- Son Dam-bi and After School (Amoled CF)
- Lee Min-ho
- UEE of After School
- Yuna Kim (Yuna's Haptic)
- 4Tomorrow (Tomorrow CF)
- 2PM (Corby and NORi F CF)
- 2NE1(Corby F and NORi CF)
- Narsha (Anycall Live CF)
- Kim Tae-woo (Anycall Live CF)
- Jung So-min (Playful Kiss)
- IU (singer)

== Related companies ==
- SK Telecom
- KT
- LG U+
- Cyon
- SK Teletech
- Motorola
- Pantech Curitel
- VK Mobile
- KTF Ever
