= Isang =

Isang may refer to:

- Isang Yun (1917–1995), Korean-born composer
- Isang Yun Competition, South Korean music competition
- Isang Yun Orchestra, North Korean orchestra
- Isang Bala, Isang Buhay, 1989 Filipino film
- Isang Bansa, Isang Diwa, former national motto of the Philippines
- Isang Ugat, Isang Dugo, 2006 album of Filipino band Rivermaya

== See also ==
- List of storms named Isang
