= 1990 Lewisham London Borough Council election =

London Election 1990

- 3 May 1990

All 67 seats up for election to Lewisham London Borough Council 34 seats needed for a majority
- Registered: 176,519
- Turnout: 79,780, 45.20%

	First party	Second party	Third party
Leader	Steve Bullock	Unknown	Unknown
Party	Labour	Conservative	Liberal Democrats
Leader since	1988	Unknown	Unknown
Leader's seat	Sydenham East	Unknown	Unknown
Seats before	50	17	0
Seats won	58	6	3
Seat change	▲8	▼11	▲3
Popular vote	108,070	60,225	12,138
Percentage	57.62%	32.11%	6.47%
Council control before election
Labour
Council control after election
Labour

Elections to Lewisham London Borough Council were held in May 1990. The whole council was up for election. Turnout was 39.6%.

== Election result ==
Lewisham local election result 1990
Party	Seats	Gains	Losses	Net gain/loss	Seats %	Votes %	Votes	+/−
Labour	58	11	3	▲8	86.57	57.61	108,070	
Conservative	6	0	11	▼11	8.95	32.11	60,225	
Liberal Democrats	3	3	0	▲3	4.48	6.47	12,138	
Green	0	0	0	Steady	0.00	2.94	5,513	
SDP	0	0	0	Steady	0.00	0.75	1,407	
Independent Labour	0	0	0	Steady	0.00	0.12	231	
Total	67						187,584	

== Ward results ==
(*) - Indicates an incumbent candidate

(†) - Indicates an incumbent candidate standing in a different ward

=== Bellingham ===
Bellingham (2)
Party	Candidate	Votes	%
Labour	John O'Shea	1,725	67.29
Labour	Ronald Stockbridge^{†} (Note: Stockbridge was a sitting councillor representing the Churchdown ward)	1,583	
Conservative	Margaret Riddell	621	24.41
Conservative	Walter Seabrook	579	
Liberal Democrats	Leslie Rowse	210	8.30
Liberal Democrats	Jessie Vickers	198	
Registered electors		6,025	
Turnout		2,692	44.68
Rejected ballots		3	0.11
Labour hold			
Labour hold			

=== Blackheath ===
Blackheath (2)
Party	Candidate	Votes	%
Labour	Gavin Moore*	1,187	44.60
Labour	Nicholas Taylor^{†} (Note: Taylor was a sitting councillor representing the Evelyn ward)	1,011	
Conservative	Teresa O'Neill	1,001	38.64
Conservative	Joshua Stevenson	902	
Green	Ronald Bailey	219	8.89
SDP	Gillian Heyworth	217	7.87
SDP	Gerald Dorey	171	
Registered electors		4,772	
Turnout		2,543	53.29
Rejected ballots		4	0.16
Labour hold			
Labour hold			

=== Blythe Hill ===
Blythe Hill (2)
Party	Candidate	Votes	%
Labour	James Eytle*	1,350	49.50
Labour	Ashtaq Arain^{†} (Note: Arain was a sitting councillor representing the Pepys ward)	1,220	
Conservative	James Collins	1,041	39.14
Conservative	Gilly Greensitt	990	
Green	Veronica Gail	295	11.36
Registered electors		5,420	
Turnout		2,676	49.37
Rejected ballots		8	0.30
Labour gain from Conservative			
Labour hold			

=== Catford ===
Catford (2)
Party	Candidate	Votes	%
Conservative	Richard Soar^{†} (Note: Soar was a sitting councillor representing the Horniman ward, a seat he won in 1989 after the death of Cllr D'Cruze)	1,377	47.96
Conservative	Theodore Yard*	1,331	
Labour	Stewart Elliott	1,140	39.99
Labour	Vernon Tyley	1,117	
Green	Peter Marsden	340	12.04
Registered electors		5,873	
Turnout		2,865	48.78
Rejected ballots		6	0.21
Conservative hold			
Conservative hold			

=== Churchdown ===
Churchdown (3)
Party	Candidate	Votes	%
Labour	Margaret Moran*	1,913	52.61
Labour	Clive Jordan^{†} (Note: Jordan was a sitting councillor representing the Ladywell ward)	1,832	
Labour	David Leah^{†} (Note: Leah was a sitting councillor representing the Marlowe ward)	1,796	
Conservative	Danny Bennett	1,369	38.73
Conservative	Susan Bennett	1,361	
Conservative	Andrew Lee	1,351	
Lib Dem Focus Team	Janet Hurst	318	8.66
Lib Dem Focus Team	Roger Anstey	317	
Lib Dem Focus Team	Ben Brooks	277	
Registered electors		7,294	
Turnout		3,882	53.22
Rejected ballots		8	0.21
Labour hold			
Labour hold			
Labour hold			

=== Crofton Park ===
Crofton Park (3)
Party	Candidate	Votes	%
Labour	Stephen Tennison	2,106	50.94
Labour	Gurbakhsh Garcha*	1,928	
Labour	Clause Gonsalves	1,920	
Conservative	Derek Stone	1,130	28.23
Conservative	Clarie Young	1,106	
Conservative	Michael Oyo	1,065	
Green	Stephen Stevens	812	20.84
Registered electors		8,219	
Turnout		3,846	46.79
Rejected ballots		10	0.26
Labour hold			
Labour hold			
Labour hold			

=== Downham ===
Downham (3)
Party	Candidate	Votes	%
Lib Dem Focus Team	Thomas Fowler* (Note: Fowler replaced Cllr Bradley after his death in 1987)	1,984	50.95
Lib Dem Focus Team	Julian Hawkins	1,771	
Lib Dem Focus Team	Rachael Pitchford	1,715	
Labour	Grace Blyth	1,243	34.38
Labour	Simon Parkes	1,233	
Labour	Norman Smith*	1,214	
Conservative	Audrey O'Donnell	557	14.67
Conservative	Beverly Poole	511	
Conservative	David O'Neill	507	
Registered electors		7,582	
Turnout		4,079	53.80
Rejected ballots		6	0.15
Lib Dem Focus Team hold			
Lib Dem Focus Team gain from Labour			
Lib Dem Focus Team gain from Labour			

=== Drake ===
Drake (3)
Party	Candidate	Votes	%
Labour	Michael Barry	2,034	60.09
Labour	Obajimi Adefiranye	1,962	
Labour	Jarman Parmar	1,745	
Green	Thomas Gray	734	23.05
Conservative	Martin Coombs	580	16.86
Conservative	Michael Hathway	520	
Conservative	Ernest Deayton	510	
Registered electors		8,163	
Turnout		3,080	37.73
Rejected ballots		5	0.16
Labour hold			
Labour hold			
Labour hold			

=== Evelyn ===
Evelyn (3)
Party	Candidate	Votes	%
Labour	Mary Edmond*	1,632	69.85
Labour	Mark Nottingham	1,397	
Labour	Mee Ng*	1,377	
Conservative	Dawn Asplin	328	15.17
Conservative	Derek Harris	317	
Green	Simon Denis	315	14.98
Conservative	Lloyd Richardson	313	
Registered electors		6,494	
Turnout		2,268	34.92
Rejected ballots		10	0.44
Labour hold			
Labour hold			
Labour hold			

=== Forest Hill ===
Forest Hill (2)
Party	Candidate	Votes	%
Labour	James Dowd^{†} (Note: Dowd was a sitting councillor representing the Drake ward)	1,350	63.66
Labour	Jacqueline Addison*	1,330	
Conservative	Michael Woolacott	809	36.34
Conservative	Andrew Mnguni	720	
Registered electors		5,260	
Turnout		2,332	44.33
Rejected ballots		12	0.51
Labour hold			
Labour hold			

=== Gringling Gibbons ===
Grinling Gibbons (3)
Party	Candidate	Votes	%
Labour	David Brown	1,650	65.48
Labour	James Mallory*	1,499	
Labour	Man Mohan*	1,413	
Green	Phillip Makepeace	460	19.80
Conservative	Betty Purdham	356	14.72
Conservative	Mark Mannix	340	
Conservative	Oswald Purdham	331	
Registered electors		7,127	
Turnout		2,467	34.61
Rejected ballots		8	0.32
Labour hold			
Labour hold			
Labour hold			

=== Grove Park ===
Grove Park (2)
Party	Candidate	Votes	%
Labour	Arthur Banks	1,216	49.49
Labour	Dorothy Hyne^{†} (Note: Hyne was a sitting councillor representing the Whitefoot ward)	1,133	
Conservative	William Bellers	1,004	41.45
Conservative	Ronald Lee	963	
Liberal Democrats	Brian Herring	229	9.06
Liberal Democrats	Johanna Brightwell	200	
Registered electors		5,207	
Turnout		2,448	47.01
Rejected ballots		1	0.04
Labour gain from Conservative			
Labour hold			

=== Hither Green ===
Hither Green (3)
Party	Candidate	Votes	%
Labour	Patrick Waylett*	2,065	62.54
Labour	Paul Newing	2,045	
Labour	Anthony Link^{†} (Note: Link was a sitting councillor representing the Crofton Park ward)	2,041	
Conservative	Josephine Foster	966	28.28
Conservative	Philip Richards	921	
Conservative	Blandie McLeod	895	
Liberal Democrats	Linda Hawkins	346	9.18
Liberal Democrats	Michael Goldthorpe	256	
Registered electors		8,501	
Turnout		3,585	42.17
Rejected ballots		12	0.33
Labour hold			
Labour hold			
Labour hold			

=== Horniman ===
Horniman (3)
Party	Candidate	Votes	%
Labour	Graeme Sandell^{†} (Note: Sandell was a sitting councillor representing the Forest Hill ward)	1,678	46.32
Labour	David Whiting	1,649	
Conservative	Charles Cramp	1,592	43.62
Labour	David Souter	1,566	
Conservative	Jeffrey Dodd* (Note: Dodd replaced Cllr Evans after his resignation in 1986)	1,529	
Conservative	Margaret Punyer^{†} (Note: Punyer was a sitting councillor representing the St Andrew ward)	1,488	
Liberal Democrats	Margaret Jupp	364	10.05
Liberal Democrats	Alec Martin	343	
Registered electors		7,999	
Turnout		3,701	46.27
Rejected ballots		5	0.14
Labour gain from Conservative			
Labour gain from Conservative			
Conservative hold			

=== Ladywell ===
Ladywell (3)
Party	Candidate	Votes	%
Labour	Cathy Doyle	2,009	61.66
Labour	Martin Garman	1,961	
Labour	James Stevenson*	1,742	
Conservative	Thelma Shilling	677	20.98
Conservative	Shriley Fitz-Earle	637	
Conservative	Paul Kreling	629	
Green	Robert Shepperd	536	17.36
Registered electors		7,502	
Turnout		3,086	41.14
Rejected ballots		9	0.29
Labour hold			
Labour hold			
Labour hold			

=== Manor Lee ===
Manor Lee (2)
Party	Candidate	Votes	%
Labour	Madeliene Long*	1,672	55.69
Labour	David Sullivan*	1,596	
Conservative	David Britton	699	23.18
Conservative	Hilda Newland	661	
Green	Simon Anstis	363	12.37
SDP	Jennifer Darnley	263	8.76
SDP	Robert Furber	250	
Registered electors		5,942	
Turnout		2,984	50.22
Rejected ballots		3	0.10
Labour hold			
Labour hold			

=== Marlowe ===
Marlowe (3)
Party	Candidate	Votes	%
Labour	Stephen Padmore*	1,773	83.35
Labour	Terence Scott^{†} (Note: Scott was a sitting councillor representing the Grove Park ward)	1,695	
Labour	Edith Gayle	1,652	
Conservative	Barbara Warren	353	16.65
Conservative	Paul Asplin	347	
Conservative	William Warren	322	
Registered electors		6,573	
Turnout		2,424	36.88
Rejected ballots		7	0.29
Labour hold			
Labour hold			
Labour hold			

=== Pepys ===
Pepys (3)
Party	Candidate	Votes	%
Labour	Angela Cornforth	2,271	83.19
Labour	Helen Dawson*	2,208	
Labour	Ian Page	2,188	
Conservative	William Mannix	473	16.81
Conservative	Anne Bocking	443	
Conservative	David Carr	430	
Registered electors		7,512	
Turnout		3,045	40.54
Rejected ballots		19	0.62
Labour hold			
Labour hold			
Labour hold			

=== Perry Hill ===
Perry Hill (3)
Party	Candidate	Votes	%
Labour	Colin Hastie	1,916	50.71
Labour	Timothy Walsh	1,865	
Labour	Duncan Rodger	1,822	
Conservative	David Lloyd*	1,376	36.70
Conservative	Simon Guest	1,370	
Conservative	Sheila Pikett	1,310	
Green	Laurel Silk	464	12.59
Registered electors		8,341	
Turnout		3,797	45.52
Rejected ballots		9	0.24
Labour gain from Conservative			
Labour gain from Conservative			
Labour gain from Conservative			

=== Rushey Green ===
Rushey Green (2)
Party	Candidate	Votes	%
Labour	Ian Arnold	1,622	67.62
Labour	Mahmuda Kabir	1,363	
Conservative	Alan Heasman	516	23.05
Conservative	Winifred Emons	501	
Liberal Democrats	Brigitte Covell	206	9.33
Liberal Democrats	Robert Parker	206	
Registered electors		6,239	
Turnout		2,470	39.59
Rejected ballots		6	0.24
Labour hold			
Labour hold			

=== St Andrew ===
St Andrew (2)
Party	Candidate	Votes	%
Labour	Michael Holder	1,063	37.71
Labour	Keith Morton	1,004	
Conservative	Robert Curtis	926	32.57
Conservative	Russel White	859	
Lib Dem Focus Team	Peter Vickers	817	29.72
Lib Dem Focus Team	Philip Easton	813	
Registered electors		5,770	
Turnout		2,920	50.61
Rejected ballots		10	0.34
Labour gain from Conservative			
Labour gain from Conservative			

=== St Margaret ===
St Margaret (2)
Party	Candidate	Votes	%
Labour	Roma Williams*	1,406	50.05
Labour	Eric Richards	1,356	
Conservative	Fiona Antcliffe	1,029	37.22
Conservative	Ruth EWhitelaw	1,025	
Liberal Democrats	Alan Ross	239	8.52
Liberal Democrats	Anthony Aldous	231	
Independent Labour	John Palmer	128	4.20
Independent Labour	Michael Dickson	103	
Registered electors		5,384	
Turnout		2,880	53.49
Rejected ballots		6	0.21
Labour hold			
Labour gain from Conservative			

=== St Mildred ===
St Mildred (3)
Party	Candidate	Votes	%
Conservative	Andrew Lawrence	2,051	47.89
Conservative	Eva Scarles*	1,954	
Conservative	Clifford Simpson* (Note: Simpson replaced Cllr Ball after his resignation in 1989)	1,922	
Labour	William Cook	1,762	39.85
Labour	Glyn Alsworth	1,676	
Labour	Alfred Levene	1,493	
SDP	Stephen O'Connor	506	12.26
Registered electors		8,490	
Turnout		4,377	51.55
Rejected ballots		12	0.27
Conservative hold			
Conservative hold			
Conservative hold			

=== Sydenham East ===
Sydenham East (3)
Party	Candidate	Votes	%
Labour	Christine Best*	1,854	54.85
Labour	Steve Bullock	1,747	
Labour	Alan Pegg*	1,692	
Conservative	Henriette Dodd	1,045	31.16
Conservative	Rosemary Pratt	981	
Conservative	Jacqueline White	980	
Green	Ronald Wilson	450	13.99
Registered electors		7,637	
Turnout		3,264	42.74
Rejected ballots		5	0.15
Labour hold			
Labour hold			
Labour hold			

=== Sydenham West ===
Sydenham West (3)
Party	Candidate	Votes	%
Labour	Martin Taylor*	1,702	49.51
Labour	William McLaughlin	1,693	
Labour	Sinna Mani^{†} (Note: Mani was a sitting councillor representing the Crofton Park ward)	1,590	
Conservative	Frederick Trollope	1,212	35.51
Conservative	Eric Penny	1,186	
Conservative	David Searle	1,177	
Liberal Democrats	Mark Bennett	284	7.15
Green	Jane Hornsey	280	7.83
Green	Lee Hornsey	245	
Liberal Democrats	Inge-Lore Sommerfield	225	
Liberal Democrats	Jose Aradas	211	
Registered electors		7,988	
Turnout		3,568	44.67
Rejected ballots		1	0.03
Labour hold			
Labour hold			
Labour gain from Conservative			

=== Whitefoot ===
Whitefoot (2)
Party	Candidate	Votes	%
Labour	Carl Kisicki	1,200	51.58
Labour	Sylvia Scott	1,177	
Conservative	Eric Coombs*	965	40.22
Conservative	Josie Martin	888	
Liberal Democrats	Catherine Ross	203	8.20
Liberal Democrats	Patricia Yendell	175	
Registered electors		5,205	
Turnout		2,501	48.05
Rejected ballots		1	0.04
Labour hold			
Labour gain from Conservative			
