= April Spring Friendship Art Festival =

North Korean festival

April Spring Friendship Art Festival 4월의 봄 친선예술축전
- Dates: April 10–18
- Frequency: Biennial
- Location: Pyongyang
- Years active: 1982–present
- Organiser: Organizing Committee of the April Spring Friendship Art Festival
- Sponsors: April Spring Friendship Art Festival Fund
- Website: http://www.korart.sca.kp/index.php/april?language=english

The April Spring Friendship Art Festival (Korean: 4월의 봄 친선예술축전) is an international arts and cultural competition held biennially in the DPRK (North Korea) since 1982.

It hosts various artistic performances ranging from solo and group (art troupe) vocalist performances, instrumental, acrobatic, dance and other stage arts in various genres such as classical, folk and etc.

== History ==
The first commemorative festival was held in Pyongyang on Juche 71 or 1982, in celebration of the 70th Anniversary of the birth of Kim Il Sung (Day of the Sun).

At the time, the name of the festival was the "4.15경축 세계 여러 나라 예술인들의 친선음악회" or in English, the "April 15th Celebration Friendship Concert by Artists from Around the World" but was changed in 1985 at the direction of the Chairman of the National Defense Commission, Kim Jong Il.

On June 3, 2011, the April Spring Friendship Art Festival Fund was established and has continuously provided sponsorship for the event since then.

== Editions ==
The festival has been held in Pyongyang every year under the idea of independence, peace and friendship on the occasion of the birth anniversary of President Kim Il Sung from 1982.

Over the past four decades, the festival has been held mainly in Pyongyang but also other cities across the country. In particular, the capital city of the country has hosted the festival 34 times, and a total number of 2090 art troupes and 2000 artists from 114 countries have taken part.

Edition	Date	Opening Day	Closing Day	Scale	Notes
1	1982	April 6th	April 20th	390 artists, 12 organizations, 8 countries	Inaugural Ceremony held at the 4.25 House of Culture in Pyongyang with the attendance of Kim Il Sung
2	1983	April 7th	April 17th	155 artists, 20 organizations, 14 countries	
3	1984	April 7th	April 17th	155 artists, 20 organizations, 14 countries	
4	1985	April 6th	April 18th	377 artists, 57 organizations, 37 countries	
5	1987	April 7th	April 19th	536 artists, 99 organizations, 75 countries	
6	1988	April 7th	April 18th	452 artists, 69 organizations, 44 countries	
7	1989	April 7th	April 18th	597 artists, 79 organizations, 60 countries	
8	1990	April 7th	April 18th	820 artists, 90 organizations, 60 countries	Since the 8th Festival, the 축전 대회상컵 and the 축전 상장 has been awarded to groups that have given excellent performances
9	1991	April 7th	April 18th	784 artists, 84 organizations, 55 countries	
10	1992	April 7th	April 19th	783 artists, 70 organizations, 45 countries	
11	1993	April 7th	April 18th	554 artists, 55 organizations, 40 countries	
12	1994	April 9th	April 18th	493 artists, 45 organizations, 32 countries	The last edition of the ASFAF which Kim Il Sung attended in person
13	1995	April 9th	April 18th	642 artists, 53 organizations, 35 countries	
14	1996	April 7th	April 17th	577 artists, 52 organizations, 30 countries	
15	1997	April 7th	April 18th	596 artists, 60 organizations, 38 countries	Since 1997, the person conducting the ‘Song of General Kim Il Sung’ at the opening performance has been given a ‘conductor’s baton’ and a ‘magnolia (chrysanthemum) sash.’
16	1998	April 8th	April 18th	675 artists, 83 organizations, 48 countries	The Pyongyang International House of Culture is opened as a venue for cultural exchange with foreigners
17	1999	April 10th	April 18th	675 artists, 83 organizations, 48 countries	
18	2000	April 10th	April 18th	680 artists, 72 organizations, 40 countries	
19	2001	April 10th	April 18th	745 artists, 85 organizations, 46 countries	Kim Yon-ja, the first South Korean singer to perform at the 19th and 20th festival
20	2002	April 14th	April 25th	1,129 artists, 100 organizations, 60 countries	The largest known gathering of foreign artists, organizations and different nationalities known to date
21	2003	April 10th	April 18th	597 artists, 75 organizations, 36 countries	British opera singer Suzannah Clark became the first British singer to perform in Pyongyang
22	2004	April 10th	April 18th	632 artists, 82 organizations, 40 countries	
23	2005	April 10th	April 18th	650 artists, 71 organizations, 36 countries	
24	2006	April 10th	April 18th	652 artists, 66 organizations, 38 countries	
25	2007	April 10th	April 18th	660 artists, 65 organizations, 30 countries	In 2009, the first American Christian rock band named 'Casting Crowns' was invited to participate in 2007 (25th Edition) and 2009 (26th Edition).
26	2009	April 10th	April 18th	651 artists, 52 organizations, 24 countries	In 2009, alongside the American Christian rock band 'Christian Crowns', a second American Christian rock band was invited, namely the 'Annie Moses Band'
27	2011	April 10th	April 18th	441 artists, 44 organizations, 16 countries	April Spring Friendship Art Festival Fund (ASFAFF) is founded on June 3, 2011, Austrian conductor Wolfdieter Maurer also conducted the National Symphony Orchestra, which played the Song of General Kim Il Sung
28	2012	April 11th	April 19th	803 artists, 52 organizations, 24 countries	Kim Il Sung's 100th birth anniversary is celebrated
29	2014	April 11th	April 17th	467 artists, 36 organizations, 21 countries	
30	2016	April 11th	April 17th	343 artists, 37 organizations, 21 countries	the 30th Edition of the ASFAF Opening Ceremony was held at the East Pyongyang Grand Theatre
31	2018	April 11th	April 17th	628 artists, 45 organizations, 19 countries	'평양국제성악콩클' or the 'First Pyongyang International Vocal Competition' is held
32	2022	April 10th	April 20th	63 organizations, 28 countries, ??? artists	The first edition of the festival where recorded performances begun broadcast via TV and the internet
33	2024	April 10th	April 18th	63 organizations, ??? artists	
34	2026	April 11th	April 30th	67 organization, 26 countries, ??? artists	

In 2020, the event was cancelled due to Covid-19 restrictions. It was originally planned to be held in the period of April 11th-17th but due to countries world wide enacting restrictions on travel, including the DPRK, it was cancelled.

== Prizes ==
Awards, certificates, prize money, souvenirs alongside gold, silver and bronze medals are presented to victors at the ASFAF.

안삼불상 (Ensemble Award), 단체상 (Group/Organization Award) and the 개인상 (Individual Award) are presented to art groups and individual artists who received high evaluations during the festival period.

== Qualification and application ==
The festival is open to all musicians, dancers and acrobats around the world, individually or in groups.

The Organizing Committee of the April Spring Friendship Art Festival oversees, organizes, prepares and assembles a jury for the event around the period of March, a few weeks before the April Spring Friendship Art Festival.

Artists who wish to participate in the event have to fill out an application form at least a year prior to the beginning of the festival. This includes personal information, performance photographs for festival promotion, video records of performance made on the spot for the festival, and explanation of each item of program for the festival, and the theatre name where the performance was given.
