= Pyongyang University =

Pyongyang University may refer to:

- Kim Il-sung University
- Pyongyang University of Science and Technology, North Korea's first privately funded university
- Pyongyang University of Foreign Studies
- Pyongyang University of Music and Dance
