= List of North Korean propaganda slogans =

North Korean propaganda uses slogans to tell citizens how to behave, think, and dress. Their themes echo the propaganda of socialist countries in emphasizing the strength of the military, the creation of a utopian society, and devotion to the state and the Supreme Leader. Some slogans have urged Korean reunification (or support for bilateral relationship-building efforts such as the April Spring Friendship Art Festival) but leader Kim Jong Un formally abandoned reunification as a goal in 2024.

== Recurring themes ==
Many slogans encourage the timely production of crops, such as vegetables, mushrooms, and other staple foods. These messages became more prevalent following the 1990s North Korean famine. Slogans frequently contain calls to action designed to bolster patriotic feelings, encourage citizens to further the country's economy, or support the sustainability and creation of renewable and non-renewable resources, such as electricity, coal and water. (Note: 석탄생산을 결정적으로 늘이자!, Let us increase coal production decisively! (2023)) (Note: 한의 전력, 한g의 석탄, 한방울의 물이라도 극력 아껴쓰자!, Let's conserve as much as possible, even if it's just one gram of electricity, one gram of coal, or one drop of water! (2014)) They were also written to remind citizens of tasks and plans set up by the government, such as the "20 × 10 Policy", which aims to build "modernized" factories in 20 cities and counties per year over the course of 10 years. Posters have been created to promote the April Spring Friendship Art Festival, the largest international competition in North Korea.

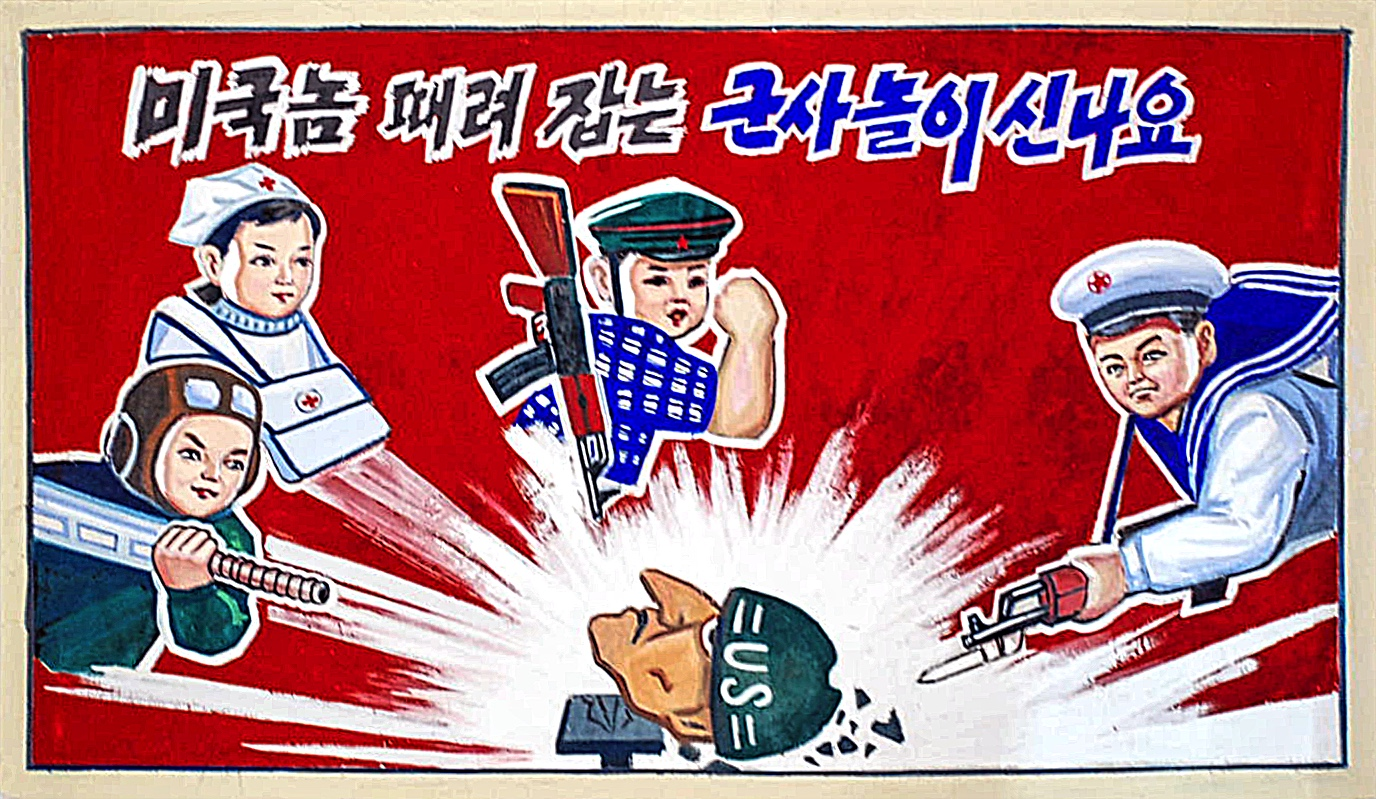
A poster depicting three North Korean children dressed as a soldier, sailor and airman shooting an American soldier, supported by one as a nurse. Translated: "It is exciting to play as soldiers beating and seizing the Americans."

Soldiers from capitalist countries, such as South Korea and the United States, are portrayed in a negative light, often depicted being killed or humiliated by North Korean soldiers. In propaganda slogans, the American government and military are often referred to as "imperialists". Posters have occasionally been made in support of Korean reunification, especially after the Inter-Korean summits, but in 2024, North Korea formally abandoned efforts to peacefully reunify Korea. A fundamental ideology in the country, single-hearted unity, (Note: Korean: 일심단결; lit. 'One heart, one mind') also referred to as "single-minded unity", is the practise of uniting to pursue a common goal. In the case of North Korea, Kim Jong Un has stated that the population's thinking and morals are "united closely around the leader". Following the Korean War, North Korean slogans promote Confucianist values, such as a patriarchal and collectivist society.

== Slogans by decade ==
The following is a non-exhaustive list of North Korean slogans with propagandic intent sorted by original decade of release. Each slogan originates from North Korea, and has significant coverage.

=== Pre-1990s ===
Slogans in Korean and English first published before the 1990s, with relevant details
Korean	English	Year of creation	Refs.
미국에 죽음을!	Death to the U.S.!	1950s	
자력갱생	Self-reliance	1950s	
조선을 위하여 배우자!	Let's study for Korea!	1953	
우리 식대로 살아나가자!	Let's live our way!	1978	
청년들이여! 모두다 북부철길건설에서 청년영웅이 되자!	Young people! Let's all become young heroes in the northern railway construction!	1985	
더 많은 물고기를 인민들에게	More seafood for the people!	1987	

=== 1990s ===
Slogans in Korean and English published during the 1990s, with relevant details
Korean	English	Year of creation	Refs.
꽃파는 처녀	The Flower Girl (Note: The opera was written by Kim Il Sung, hence why it is deemed revolutionary.)	1991	
내 나라 제일로 좋아	"My Country is the Best" (Note: This is also the title of a song by the Pochonbo Electronic Ensemble.)	c.1990s	
북과 남의 애국력량이 힘을 합쳐 안팎의 분렬주의자들의 《두개조선》조작책동을 짓부시고 조국을 통일하자!	Let the patriotic forces of the North and the South join forces to crush the "two Joseon" maneuvers of the separatists at home and abroad and unify the country!	1991	
우리사상 제일주의를 높이 들고 나가자!	Hold fast to the Juche idea!	1991	
전후 천리마대고조시기의 그 기세, 그 기백으로 살며 일하자!	Live and work in the spirit of the great Chollima Movement of the post war period!	1991	
공화국의 존엄과 자주권을 튼튼히 수호하자!	Let's provide a strong line of defence for the Republic's honour and sovereignty!	1991	
더 많은 쌀을 전선에로!	Get more rice to the front!	1997	
미국의 핵전쟁도발책동을 짓부시자!	Crush U.S. attempts to provoke a nuclear war!	1997	
신념의 강자, 비전향장기수들을 열렬히 환영합니다!	A warm welcome to those long held in foreign prisons, resistors who held steadfast to their faith!	1997	
장군님의 전사들은 언제나 준비되여 있습니다!	The General's soldiers stand always at the ready!	1997	
펄펄 나는 일당백의 싸움군으로 준비하자!	Train harder, so each of us will equal one hundred of our enemies!	1997	
강성대국	Strong and Prosperous Nation	1998	
사회주의는 필승불패이다!	Socialism is invincible!	1998	
우리식 사회주의	Our style of socialism. Socialism our way!	1998	
조선옷차림을 생활화합시다!	Wear traditional Korean clothing, beautiful and gracious!	1998	
당과 수령, 사회주의조국을 목숨으로 사수하자!	Let's defend the party, its leader, and the socialist fatherland by arming all citizens!	1998	
금요로동은 충성의 애국로동이다. 모두다 금요로동에로!	Working on Friday is patriotic. Let's all work on Fridays!	1998	
지구상에서 미국을 없애버릴것이다!	We will blast the U.S. from the face of the earth!	1998	
민족과 운명	Nation and Destiny (Note: The film was personally selected by Kim Jong Il.)	1998	
2모작을 적극 받아들여 만풍년을 이룩하자!	Let's achieve bigger harvests by double-cropping according to each region's conditions!	1998	
우리는 빈말을 하지 않는다!	We do not like empty talk!	1998	
위대한 수령님과 영광스러운 당중앙을 목숨으로 사수하자!	Protect the Great Leader and the Central Committee of the Workers' Party of Korea!	1999	
우리 당의 충직한 청년전위가 되자!	Join the young vanguard, pledge faith to the Party!	1999	
더많은 식량을 전선에 보내자!	Get more food to the frontlines!	1999	
전력생산을 빨리 늘이자!	Work to increase energy production as quickly as possible!	1999	

=== 2000s ===
Slogans in Korean and English published during the 2000s, with relevant details
Korean	English	Year of creation	Refs.
눈에 흙이 들어가도 잊을수 없다!	We never forget until we die! (Note: This slogan and its corresponding image refer to the United States' involvement in the Korean War.)	2000	
잊지 말라 승냥이미제를!	Never forget the U.S. imperialists, those wolves!	2000	
미군의 천인공노할 만행을 만천하에 고발한다!	We denounce the violent crimes against South Korean women committed by U.S. soldiers!	2000	
성폭행이 없는 21세기를!	Put an end to sexual violence in the 21st century!	2000	
총대는 승리, 전진 앞으로!	Guns mean victory, advance onward!	2000	
순결한 량심과 의리로 살며 투쟁하자!	Let us live and fight with pure conscience and loyalty!	2000	
위대한 선군정치는 참다운 애국 애족 애민의 정치!	Military First policy is the right way to show love of the land, the nation, and the people!	2000	
육탄, 총폭탄!	A human bomb, with gun and grenades!	2000	
일당백구호를 높이 들고 내나라, 내조국, 내고향을 목숨바쳐 지키자!	Soldiers of the Korean People's Army! Fight for our country, our fatherland and to defend our native village!	2000	
사회주의기치를 끝까지 고수하자!	Let's hold forever high the banner of socialism, which our revolutionary forebears defended with their blood!	2000	
사상의 강자, 신념의 강자가 되자!	Strive to become like Jong Song-ok, an athlete of great conviction and faith whose sole inspiration was the General!	2000	
토지정리사업에 계속 큰힘을 넣자!	Keep working hard to increase land reclamation!	2001	
종자혁명을 기본고리로 틀어쥐고 나가자!	Continue the progress of the Seed Revolution, (Note: The "Seed Revolution" is a policy intended to develop climate-resistant, high-yielding crops, thereby achieving self-sufficiency.) the key to agricultural development!	2001	
통일의 꽃 김정일화 만발하여라!	Kimjongilia, the flower of reunification, flourishes!	2001	
단결의 기치, 승리의 기치로 높이 들고 나가자!	May comradeship be the eternal emblem of unity and victory for our revolution!	2002	
비핵지대를 창설하자!	Let's create a nuclear-free zone!	2002	
경애하는 최고사령관동지를 총대로 결사옹위하자!	Let's defend our respected Supreme Commander by force of arms!	2002	
사상관점도 투쟁기풍도 선군의 요구대로!	The ideological perspective and fighting spirit are in line with the demands of the Songun movement!	2004	
사회주의적생활양식에 맞게 머리단장을 하자	Let us trim our hair in accordance with Socialist lifestyle	2004	
경애하는 어버이 김일성동지는 인민의 심장속에 영원할것이다.	Our beloved father, Comrade Kim Il Sung, will live forever in the hearts of the people!	2007	
위대한 장군님만 계시면 우리는 이긴다!	With the General, we will win! (Note: The General in this case is Kim Jong Il.)	2008	
미국놈 때려 잡는 군사놀이 신나요	It is exciting to play as soldiers beating and seizing the Americans.	2009	

=== 2010s ===
On 11 February 2015, a joint declaration of the Central Committee of the Workers' Party of Korea and the Central Military Commission of the Workers' Party of Korea was published, featuring 310 new slogans. Additionally, 349 new slogans were created the following year. For the sake of this list, only those with significant coverage will be included.

Slogans in Korean and English supporting scientific and technological advancements, with relevant details
Korean	English	Year of creation	Refs.
선군정치의 위대한 승리 만세!	Long live the great victory of Songun!	2011	
위대한 수령 김일성동지와 위대한 령도자 김정일동지는 영원히 우리와 함께 계신다!	Great Leader Comrade Kim Il Sung and Great Leader Comrade Kim Jong Il will always be with us!	2012	
위대한 김일성-김정일주의 만세!	Long live the Great Kim Il Sung-Kim Jong Ilism!	2012 (Note: The slogan was reused in 2015 and 2016.)	
위대한 김정은동지를 수반으로 하는 당중앙위원회를 목숨으로 사수하자!	Let's defend the Party Central Committee headed by the great Comrade Kim Jong Un with our lives!	2012	
—N/a	No more belt-tightening (Note: This replaced an earlier slogan, "One meal a day", after Kim Jong Un became Supreme Leader of North Korea.)	2012	
위대한 김정은동지 우리는 끝까지 당신께 충실하겠습니다!	Great Comrade Kim Jong Un, we will remain faithful to you to the last!	2013	
《마식령속도》로 온 나라에 대비약, 대혁신의 불바람을 일으키자!	Let's spark a great leap forward and great innovation across the country with Masikryeong Speed!	2013	
침략전쟁을 일으킨다면 미국놈부터 박살낼것이다!	When provoking a war of aggression, we will hit back, beginning with the U.S.!	2013	
당 제7차대회를 인민생활향상에서의 자랑찬 성과로 맞이하자!	Let's greet the 7th Party Congress with proud achievements in the improvement of the people's living standard!	2015	
—N/a	Complete with credit the construction of Mirae Scientists Street and other major projects and thus splendidly adorn the venue of the grand October celebration!	2015	
금수산태양궁전을 영원한 태양의 성지답게 더 훌륭히 꾸리고 결사보위하자!	Let us spruce up more wonderfully the Kumsusan Palace of the Sun as befitting the holy land of the eternal sun and devotedly defend it!	2015	
국제경기들에서 영웅조선의 새로운 체육신화들을 창조하라!	Create new legendary stories about sports of heroic Korea in international games!	2015	
새 세기 출판보도혁명,문학예술혁명을 일으키라!	Bring about a revolution in media and literature and arts in the new century!	2015	
자주, 평화, 친선의 리념밑에 대외관계를 더욱 확대발전시켜나가자!	Let us further expand the external relations in the idea of independence, peace and friendship!	2015	
모란봉악단의 혁명적이며 전투적인 창조기풍을 따라배우라!	Learn from the revolutionary and militant creative style of the Moranbong Band!	2015	
세계와 경쟁하라, 세계에 도전하라, 세계를 앞서나가라！	Compete with the world, challenge the world, get ahead of the world!	2015	
—N/a	This year we will mark the 50th anniversary of the creation of the sub-workteam management system (Note: The term "sub-workteam management system" refers to one of the North Korean government's responses to food shortage. It is an agricultural plan in which work teams lease farmland and are given output.) by the great Comrade Kim Il Sung, which is the advantageous form and method of our style to organize and manage for production.	2015	
—N/a	Let us carry through the great Generalissimos' instructions on "grass for meat"! (Note: The term "grass for meat" does not refer to vegetarianism, but instead the agricultural practice of providing sufficient grazing area (grass) for livestock (meat).)	2015	
우리 당과 인민의 최고령도자 김정은동지 만세!	Long live Comrade Kim Jong Un, the supreme leader of our party and people!	2016	
경애하는 김정은원수님께서 올해신년사에서 제시하신 강령적과업을 철저히 관철하자!	Let us thoroughly implement the programmatic tasks presented by respected Marshal Kim Jong Un in his New Year's address this year!	2016	
전당과 온 사회에 경애하는 김정은동지의 유일적령도체계를 더욱 철저히 세우자!	Let us further establish the sole leadership system of the respected Comrade Kim Jong Un throughout the Party and society!	2016	
김정은장군 목숨으로 사수하리라	I will protect General Kim Jong Un with my life.	2016	
위대한 김정은시대를 빛내이는 위훈의 창조자가 되자!	Let us become the creators of achievements that glorify the great era of Kim Jong Un!	2016	
당은 부른다 모두다 70일전투에로!	The party is calling everyone to the 70-day battle! (Note: This slogan is not referring to a literal battle, but instead, a mass mobilisation campaign that preceded the 7th Congress. The campaign was criticised by Human Rights Watch, who claimed that the campaign meant uncompensated and forced labour, as well as child labour, and that its objectives were to boost outputs in manufacturing and agriculture and demonstrate loyalty.)	2016	
우리는 주체혁명위업수행에서 력사적인 분수령으로 될 당 제７차대회를 승리자의 대회,영광의 대회로 빛내여야 합니다.	We must glorify the 7th Party Congress, which will be a historic watershed in the accomplishment of the Juche revolutionary cause, as a congress of victors and a congress of glory.	2016	
충정의 200일전투에서 영예로운 승리자가 되자!	Let's become an honourable winner in the 200-day battle of loyalty! (Note: The term "200-day battle" does not refer to a literal battle, but instead an economic plan.)	2016	
모두다 만리마속도창조운동에로!	Everyone, join the Mallima Speed Creation Movement! (Note: The Mallima Speed Creation Movement, also known as the Mallima Movement, was launched in 2016 as part of Kim Jong Un's 5-year economic plan. The movement was named after the mythical horse Mallima, which is believed to fly 10,000 li a day, 10 times more than Chollima.)	2016	
조국통일	Unification of the Fatherland	2016	
일심단결은 주체혁명의 천하지대본, 필승의 무기!	Single-hearted unity is the great foundation and ever-victorious weapon for the Juche revolution!	2016	
일심단결	Single-hearted Unity	2016	
백두의 칼바람정신	Paektu's Cold Wind Spirit	2016	
백두의 혁명정신	Paektu's revolutionary spirit	2016	
위대한 인민을 위하여!	For the great people!	2016	
최상의 문명을 최고의 수준에서!	The best civilisation at the highest level!	2016	
조선로동당 제7차대회를 위대한 승리로 빛내이자！	Let us make the 7th Congress of the Workers' Party of Korea shine with great victory!	2016	
조선로동당 제7차대회가 열리는 올해에 강성국가건설의 최전성기를 열어나가자！	Let us open the golden age of building a strong and prosperous nation this year when the 7th Congress of the Workers' Party of Korea is held!	2016	
위대한 수령 김일성동지와 위대한 령도자 김정일동지께 가장 숭고한 경의와 영원무궁한 영광을 드립니다	We give the noblest respect and eternal glory to Great Leader Comrade Kim Il Sung and Great Leader Comrade Kim Jong Il	2017	
장군복	Embrace of the General	2017	
위대한 령도자 김정일동지께 가장 숭고한 경의와 최대의 영광을 드립니다!	We give the noblest respect and greatest glory to Great Leader Comrade Kim Jong Il!	2017	
김일성대원수 만만세!	Long live Marshal Kim Il Sung!	2017	
경애하는 최고령도자 김정은동지 만세!	Long live our beloved Supreme Leader Comrade Kim Jong Un!	2017	
수령복	Embrace of the Leader	2017	
수령님과 장군님은 함께 계시네	The leader and the general are together	2017	
오늘도 7련대는 우리앞에 있어라!	The 7th Regiment is in front of us again today!	2017	
백두의 행군길 이어가리라	We will continue the march of Paektu	2017	
당중앙을 목숨으로 사수하자!	Let us defend the party center with our lives!	2017	
백전백승의 불패의 당 만세!	Long live the invincible Party!	2017	
백전백승의 불패의 당 조선로동당 만세!	Long live the Workers' Party of Korea, the undefeated party that has won every battle!	2017	
조선의 대답!	Joseon's answer! (Note: The poster depicts numerous weapons of mass destruction aimed at the United States.)	2017	
위대한 령도자 김정일동지의 사상과 업적을 만년초석으로 하여 주체의 사회주의위업을 끝까지 완성하자	Let us complete the cause of Juche socialism to the end, using the ideas and achievements of the great leader Comrade Kim Jong Il as the foundation for the rest of our lives.	2017	
위대한 령도자 김정일동지를 주체의 영원한 태양으로 높이 받들어모시자!	Let's hold the Great Leader Comrade Kim Jong Il high as the eternal sun of Juche!	2017	
경애하는 최고령도자 김정은동지의 령도따라 주체혁명위업을 끝까지 완성하자!	Let's complete the Juche revolutionary cause to the end, following the leadership of Respected Supreme Leader Comrade Kim Jong Un!	2017	
미본토전역이 우리의 사정권안에 있다!	The entire United States is within our range!	2017	
조국과 인민을 위하여 복무함!	Serve for your country and people!	2017	
영웅적조선인민군 만세!	Long live the heroic Korean Peoples' Army!	2017	

=== 2020s ===
Slogans in Korean and English published during the 2020s, with relevant details
Korean	English	Year of creation	Refs.
자력갱생의 기치높이 사회주의건설의 새로운 진격로를 열어나가자!	Let us open a new road of advance for socialist construction under the uplifted banner of self-reliance!	2020	
모두다 당중앙위원회 제7기 제5차전원회의 결정관철에로!	All towards achieving the decisions of the 5th Plenary Meeting of the 7th Party Central Committee!	2020	
우리 당의 영광스러운 혁명전통으로 튼튼히 무장하자!	Let us firmly arm ourselves with the glorious revolutionary traditions of our Party!	2020	
당은 부른다 모두다 80일전투에로!	The Party calls on us to turn out in the 80-day campaign! (Note: On 5 October 2020, an 80-day mass mobilisation campaign was announced, which took place from 12 October until 30 December 2020.)	2020	
새로운 승리를 향하여	Towards a new victory	2022	
조국의 무궁한 번영과 인민의 안녕을 위하여	For the endless prosperity of the fatherland and the security of the people!	2023	
조선혁명의 심장인 우리 당중앙위원회를 위하여	For our Party's Central Committee, the heart of the Korean Revolution!	2023	
당과 국가의 굳건한 안전과 주체혁명위업의 승리를 위하여	For the firmly security of the party and the country, and the victory of the great achievement of Juche revolution!	2023	
사회주의조국의 정치적안전과 인민의 행북을 보위하여	Protect the political security of the socialist motherland and the people's happiness!	2023	
조선민주주의인민공화국의 안전과 인민의 안녕을 위하여	For the defence of the Democratic People's Republic of Korea and the security of the people!	2023	
미제와 대한민국족속들을 무자비하게 짓뭉개버리자!	Let us destroy the U.S. imperialists and the clan of the Republic of Korea without mercy! (Note: The poster depicts a North Korean tank crushing South Korean soldiers.)	2024	
무자비한 철추를!	Merciless iron weight!	2024	
자주, 평화, 친선의 노래 힘차게 부르자!	Let us loudly sing the song of independence, peace and friendship! (Note: This was made for the April Spring Friendship Art Festival, an international competition associated with improving relations between North Korea and other countries.)	2024	
경애하는 김정은동지의 사상과 평도를 일심으로 받들어 우리 국가의 전면적릉성기를 펼쳐나가자!	Let us unfold the all-round prosperity of our nation by single-mindedly upholding the ideology and opinions of our beloved Comrade Kim Jong Un!	2025	

=== Unknown ===
Nationalistic slogans in Korean and English, with relevant details
Korean	English	Year of creation	Refs.
조선민주주의인민공화국 만세!	Long live the Democratic People's Republic of Korea!	Unknown	
인민위천	The People are God	Unknown	
영광스러운 조선로동당 만세!	Long Live the glorious Workers' Party of Korea!	Unknown	
위대한 김일성민족 김정일조선의 존엄과 영예를 온세상에 빛내이자!	Let us enrich the dignity and glory of Great Kim Il Sung's nation and Kim Jong Il's Korea to the entire world!	Unknown (post-1994)	
김정일애국주의를 구현하여 부강조국건설을 다그치자!	Let us step up the building of a prosperous country by applying Kim Jong Il's patriotism!	Unknown (post-1994; possibly 2016)	
김정일 위원장을 향한 애국심으로 우리 자신을 단단히 무장하자!	Let's arm ourselves strongly with Kim Jong Il's patriotism! (Note: This was the slogan on the poster that Otto Warmbier reportedly tried to steal during his trip to North Korea in 2016.)	Unknown (post-1994; possibly 2016)	
무궁토록 번영할 김정은강성조선의 래일을 앞당기자!	Let us bring forward a tomorrow where Kim Jong Un's strong Korea prospers forever!	Unknown (post-2012)	
경애하는 최고령도자 김정은동지를 결사옹위하는 총폭탄이 되자!	Let us become human bombs to devotedly defend Respected Supreme Leader Comrade Kim Jong Un!	Unknown (post-2012)	
단숨에	In one breath (Note: This slogan, used by Kim Jong Un, represents the significant policy changes his administration has made since he became Supreme Leader.)	Unknown (post-2012)	
