= Isang Yun Orchestra =

North Korean Western-style chamber orchestra

- Hangul: 윤이상관현악단
- Hanja: 尹伊桑管絃樂團
- RR: Yun Isang gwanhyeonakdan
- MR: Yun Isang kwanhyŏnaktan

The Isang Yun Orchestra (Korean: 윤이상관현악단) is a Western-style chamber orchestra in North Korea. Named after the composer Isang Yun, the orchestra is attached to the Isang Yun Music Institute in Pyongyang.

== History ==
The IYO was established in December 1990 by the conductor Kim Il-Jin, who gathered 42 young performers from across the country. In December 1992, the Isang Yun Music Hall (윤이상음악당), a chamber music hall, opened at the Isang Yun Isang Music Institute in the Pyongyang International House of Culture and the IYO became the orchestra-in-residence of this hall.

The IYO's principal conductor is Ryong-Ung Kang and concertmaster is Cheol-Ryong Kim. They also play under Kim Byeong-hwa, Kim Ho-yun, Kim Il-jin, Kim Hong-jae and other conductors from abroad.

== Repertoire ==
The IYO performs a wide repertoire with both domestic and foreign works, from Bach to Isang Yun.

== Members ==
Some IYO members also play in the State Symphony Orchestra of DPRK and the Merited Female Instrumental Ensemble of the Mansudae Art Troupe. Unlike the SSO, male and female performers are not separated in the IYO.

== Performances and recordings ==
In 1999 and 2004, the IYO toured China and Germany as a temporary chamber ensemble named 'Isang Yun Ensemble Pyongyang'. Their 1999 tour to Berlin consisted of five chamber works of Isang Yun, and was recorded by the German recording company WERGO. The recording was released and imported to South Korea a few years later.

In 2005, the South Korean recording company Synnara Music released four CDs which contain North Korean orchestral works performed by SSO, IYO and other music troupes of North Korea.

== See also ==
- Music of North Korea
- List of North Korean musicians
