= Jo Myong Ae =

North Korean dancer and actress

- 조명애
- Born: North Korea
- Education: Pyongyang University of Music and Dance
- Occupations: Dancer, actress

Jo Myong Ae (Korean: 조명애), alternatively romanized as Cho Myung Ae, is a North Korean dancer and actress. She became widely known in South Korea for appearances in the 2000s during the Sunshine Policy, including appearances in the first television show collaboration between North and South Korea and the first South Korean ad featuring a North Korean. She gained a large fanbase in South Korea with more than 17,000 members. She has not been seen by the public since her appearances in the television show in 2007.

== Biography ==
According to pro–North Korea news site Tongil News, she began dancing from a young age, and participated in performances at the Mangyongdae Children's Palace. According to North Korean defector and actress Ri Kyung, Jo went on to attend the Pyongyang University of Music and Dance for its eight-year program, where she was seen as studious and hard-working. After graduation, she joined the Mansudae Art Troupe. According to Tongil, in 2003, during an interview, a North Korean official stated they selected her for her beauty.

She first entered South Korea in 2002, when she, along with the rest of the Mansudae, performed at the National Unification Rally, a pro–Korean reunification event in Seoul. She quickly garnered a fanbase, with a website dedicated to her fanbase being created and reaching more than 17,000 members. She soon gained further attention by modeling for the website and advertisements of the Pyongyang-based Korea Pugang Corporation.

In 2005, Jo gained international attention when Samsung selected her to appear in advertisements for Anycall phones. She starred in the advertisement, which was filmed in Shanghai, opposite South Korean celebrity Lee Hyori, and was the first North Korean to appear in a South Korean advertisement. She was set to receive the same salary as a South Korean actor would, much more than salaries in North Korea. She sang together with Hyori and taught traditional dance to her.

According to South Korean spy on North Korea Park Chae-seo, who had arranged the 2005 commercial, before the ad, Jo Myong Ae was set to marry a South Korean businessman for the purposes of unity. While not excited at first, she soon grew to like her fiancee and his family. However, the National Intelligence Service dissuaded the marriage. Park states that the NIS alleged she was a member of the Kippumjo, which is widely considered to not be the case, to get the marriage called off. This, according to Park, left Jo unwilling to eat or talk, and her ex-fiancee's father came to console her before filming continued. According to Kim Dang, a reporter who was there, she cried continuously.

In 2007, she was cast in Sayeuksin, the first television show collaboration between North Korea and South Korea, themed around historical Korean culture. It was also the first live television drama from North Korea. She was selected to attract attention to the show, as a well-known star from North Korea. Reviews were lukewarm, however.

In 2009, a North Korean defector named Lee stated that Jo was suffering from a stomach ailment she had caught during her work on Sayeuksin and was not able to take medicine due to a difficult financial situation. He alleged that she had not received any of the money from her performances and advertisements, which had been taken by the government, and had only been given a home telephone and a used bus for her troop by North Korea. Tongil News disputed that claim, however.

Nothing further is known about her life after this. According to Park, the plan, as of 2010, was for her to live in China and run a restaurant. He has vigorously disputed media rumors that she married a military official in North Korea.
