= Fever's End =

Studio album by Tablo
- Released: October 21, 2011
- Recorded: 2010–2011 ARK Sound/YG Ent.
- Genre: Rap music, hip-hop
- Length: 39:20
- Label: YG Entertainment
- Producer: Tablo

Fever's End (Korean: 열꽃) is the first studio album by South Korean singer Tablo. It was released on October 21, 2011, by YG Entertainment. This is Tablo's first solo album outside of Epik High, and features contributions from artists such as Lee So-ra, Naul, and Bong Tae-gyu. Tablo, the leader of the hip hop group Epik High, broke his hiatus caused by the members' military enlistment and the academic forgery controversy to release the album after 1 year and 8 months. The album contains many autobiographical stories of Tablo during and after the academic forgery controversy, making it an emotionally rich hip-hop and rap album. The compositions lean toward a somewhat minimalist and calm atmosphere, with Tablo focusing heavily on the melodies and lyrics.

The album generally received decent to positive reviews from both the public and critics, who particularly praised Tablo's lyric-writing ability and rich emotional expression, though Part 2 received a string of negative feedback.

On October 14, 2011, "Airbag" was pre-released as the first single. The album was released in two parts of 5 songs each on October 21 and November 1, with the physical album consisting of 1 CD containing a total of 10 tracks. The title tracks "Bad" and "Tomorrow" reached number 1 on South Korea's major online music charts, and ranked high on the iTunes Hip-Hop/Rap chart, the Billboard charts K-Pop chart, and World Albums chart. However, it did not achieve any remarkable physical album sales or music award wins.

== Background ==
Regarding his comeback with Fever's End, Tablo shared his feelings about music during that period, stating, "The only way I could protect the people precious to me, and the only way to make them happy, at least for me, seemed to be music." Looking back at the early stages of the album, which began as a hum to endure his complex thoughts and emotions, Tablo said, "I didn't know it would turn into an album like this." The reason the album was titled Fever's End was because Tablo noticed his child breaking out in a rash from a fever. His wife, Kang Hye-jung, explained to him that when the fever rash appears, it means the illness is at its most painful peak, but it is also a sign that the fever and body aches are finally coming to an end. Following Tablo's wish that people would feel the preciousness of small hope and happiness just like that rash after a fever, the title was decided.

Regarding the first track of Part 1, "Home," Tablo described it as a song that was both easy and difficult to make at the same time. For the lyrics, he did not write them down separately but instead crafted them using sentences he often thought about. From the time of composition, Tablo had Lee So-ra in mind as the featuring vocalist, and during the casting process, he firmly told her, "If Lee So-ra does not participate, I will not write this song." Tablo revealed this story during his appearance on *Lee So-ra's Second Proposal*. The title track of Part 1, "Bad," is a breakup song written about love, focusing on things that Tablo considers "bad." He was also inspired by the way people get hurt due to the futile hope that those close to them would not be bad to them. Jinsil, who participated as the vocalist, was recruited after being recommended by Nell's and with the help of Primary.

"Airbag", which was pre-released as a single prior to the album release, was inspired by Tablo often taking taxis at dawn Kim Jong-wan due to his poor driving skills. While it is not Tablo's own story, he stated it is "a story about a lonely person heading home in a taxi" or "the story of all lonely people." The guide vocal for the original song was recorded by Bumkey, who also participated in the track "From the Bottom." "The Tide" is a song that students or people transitioning into adulthood can particularly relate to. Tablo uniquely explained that while eating, he randomly saw leftover grilled fish and thought it resembled himself, prompting him to write the lyrics and create the song that very day. "From the Bottom" was the hardest song for Tablo to write and record. The first verse is a story dedicated to his wife, and the second verse is dedicated to his daughter. The baby voice at the end is the actual voice of his daughter when she said "Papa" for the first time.

"Tomorrow", the first track of Part 2, was written with a "no tomorrow" theme, contrasting with the theme song "Tomorrow" from the musical Annie that Tablo listened to during his childhood. It is a song about separation, while simultaneously reflecting his emotions toward music, handling a universally relatable theme from various perspectives. Furthermore, Tablo had Taeyang in mind for the feature even before signing with YG. Taeyang mentioned that the collaboration happened suddenly and was recorded on the very first day Tablo visited the YG studio. "Source" was created to express gratitude through song to the people and processes that provide what we have and what we eat and drink. Composed of sharp lyrics, the song carries the meaning that if we cannot do anything about the beauty that comes from ugly things, we should at least know its "source" and be grateful. "Dear TV / Fever" is a song aimed at international listeners by utilizing Korean traditional music elements to express the album's artwork with an oriental beat accompanied by English rap. In the commentary film, Tablo noted that he wrote it with the thought of "writing a letter to TV, which would be an unknowable and complex person if it were human." Later, in an interview with Hiphopplaya, he stated, "I wanted to capture the determination not to lose oneself in the dangerous space that is television." "Thankful Breath" was the last song composed for the album and is a bright track, for which Tablo converted his own written "list of reasons why I must live" into the lyrics. His close friends Yankie and Bong Tae-gyu participated in the track. "Expiration Date" was originally a guide song for someone else and one of his sketches, but he recorded it following recommendations from people around him. It is "a song that expresses the fear of fading away, just as there is a time to rise, there is a time to fall." In an interview with Hiphopplaya, Tablo explained his reason for placing it as the final track: "For humans, there is no happy ending, and even when happiness arrives, you never know when misfortune will strike, so I placed it at the very end."

== Composition ==
In terms of composition, *Fever's End* features a simple and minimalist sound because Tablo condensed what he had done previously rather than pursuing new changes. Regarding this, Tablo stated that he did not possess the compositional ability to make groundbreaking attempts and chose to place more emphasis on the lyrics and melodies rather than the track construction. In addition, he pursued minimalism during the mixing stage by stripping away sources. At the beginning of the project, Tablo composed at home by accompanying himself on a single upright piano to overlay the lyrics and melodies. Because using synthesizers and sequencing with computers during the latter half of the production would create a sense of estrangement from the piece he originally envisioned, he finished the work keeping the simple atmosphere intact.

== Critical reception ==
Professional ratings
Review scores
Source	Rating
IZM	4/5 stars
Naver	7.3/10
Rhythmer	4/5 stars

Fever's End generally received favorable reviews. On Naver Music, Part 2 scored an average of 7.3 out of 10 and was selected as the "Discovery of the Week" for the third week of November 2011. Lee Ho-young, a member of the selection committee for the Korean Music Awards and one of the 10 evaluators, praised the album positively, stating, "The public is rather grateful and welcoming to see him return with music containing a more matured sensitivity within healing and reflection," awarding it a score of 8 points along with the comment, "His own healing method, which cooled a heart that had become hot enough to cause burns into calmness to create equanimity, is highly relatable." Yoo Sung-ho, a netizen selection committee member for Today's Music, praised Tablo's songwriting skills, noting that there can be no disagreement about his lyrical talent. While expressing regret that Part 2 lacked organic connectivity between tracks and felt weak as a conclusion to the latter half, he still evaluated the comeback work positively, stating, "The fact that he achieved a successful return through *Fever's End* remains an undeniable truth." Lee Byung-joo, a writer for the black music website *Rhythmer*, gave it 4 out of 5 stars, praising the excellent emotional lines felt in Part 1 by stating, "The first part has higher emotional waves (...) The resonance delivered by the lyrics, which unfold his situation through storytelling, is substantial." He also complimented his lyrical ability for Part 2, stating, "A bit more vitality is felt in the second part (...) The rhymes are also unfurled more tightly." Regarding "Source" in particular, he added that it is "the song where the genre-specific charm is most prominently revealed in the album." However, regarding Part 2, he offered negative feedback, noting that "regret remains in the overall balance and the seams of the included tracks," criticizing the work as failing to focus on any single element, because while it contained a lot of content, "there is a lack of room to completely fall into any one thing." Hong Hyuk-ui of the professional music review site *IZM* gave it 4 out of 5 stars, commenting that Tablo's unique style has developed further and permeates the album. Regarding the emotional delivery, which is the album's greatest strength, he praised it positively, stating the reason lies in "the appealing vocals" of the featuring singers like Lee So-ra and Tablo's use of metaphors, adding that it is "an achievement reached by combining Tablo's melody-composing ability."

== Achievements ==
- US Billboard World Albums Chart No. 2
- US and Canada iTunes Hip-Hop Chart No. 1
- US MTV IGGY Selected 5th Best Debut Album of the Year Worldwide
- Hiphopplaya Artist and Album of the Month
- Naver Music Discovery of the Week - Selected for the 2nd week of November (Domestic)
- IZM Selected Album of the Year (Domestic)
- Hiphopplaya Awards Album of the Year

== Chart performance ==
"Airbag", which was pre-released prior to the album launch, topped the music charts on the day of its release. "Airbag" debuted at number 5 on the Billboard charts K-Pop Hot 100 in the first week of November. Part 1 also swept the number 1 spot on 6 music charts immediately after its release. Additionally, the title track "Bad" placed 4th on the Billboard chart for the second week of November. Part 2 and its title track "Tomorrow" entered the top ranks of all music charts immediately upon release. Furthermore, it ranked 5th on the US iTunes Hip-Hop/Rap Albums chart, and the following day, it topped the iTunes Hip-Hop charts in both the US and Canada while ranking 2nd in Japan, charting high on iTunes charts in multiple countries. In the first week of November, Part 1 debuted at number 4 on the US Billboard World Albums chart, and in the second week of November, Part 2 rose to number 2 while Part 1 positioned at number 5.

"Fever's End" debuted and peaked at number 12 on the Gaon Album Chart in the third week of November 2011. On the monthly charts, it ranked 23rd overall in November 2011.

== Promotion ==
The tracks included in "Fever's End" were worked on from July 2010 to early 2011 solely by Tablo, who had completely suspended his activities due to the academic forgery controversy that resurfaced in May 2010, he stated that because of the controversy at the time of production, the songs were made without any clear plans or goals. Starting around May 2011, about a year after his hiatus, he began public activities by giving two lectures but avoided making specific comments regarding musical activities. From that point, YG Entertainment helped Tablo with his activities by providing a manager and a vehicle, and Yang Hyun-suk, who listened to Tablo's work tracks, proposed an album release. Afterwards, on September 27, it was announced that he signed a 4-year contract with YG Entertainment and would release a solo album on November 1.

Subsequently, on October 14, the album's pre-release track "Airbag" featuring Naul was released, and along with the reveal of the tracklist on October 20, the release plan for *Fever's End*, which was originally set for November 1, was suddenly changed to be split into Part 1 and Part 2 with 5 tracks each, along with the tracklist announcement on October 20, the audio for Part 1 of the album was released on October 21 at 10 AM. On October 24, three days after the album release, the music video for Part 1's title track "Bad" was released. Following this, he announced he would hold a comeback stage through Inkigayo on October 30, where he performed "Bad" and pre-released "Tomorrow" alongside Taeyang. He also shared his thoughts through an interview, stating, "I am happy to be able to make music again."

On November 1, Part 2 of Fever's End and the music video for its lead track "Tomorrow" were released. On November 3, it was announced that a Tablo's Fever's End exhibition would open at Hongdae Sangsangmadang and run until November 13. Subsequently, a commentary video about the album was released through Tablo's official YouTube channel, and an English subtitled version was released on the 7th. Coming into November 6, starting with his participation in the Love Sharing Concert, he participated in the recording of Lee So-ra's Second Proposal on November 9, which was broadcast on November 15.

The following year, it won the Album of the Year category with 23.1% at the Hiphopplaya Awards 2011 hosted by Hiphopplaya. Furthermore, the tracks "Airbag" and "Source" were also nominated for the Single of the Year category, ranking 5th and 8th respectively.

=== Music videos ===
On October 24, 2011, the music video for "Bad," the title track of *Fever's End* Part 1, was released. It was directed by Han Sa-min and starred Tablo along with Yang Yoon-young and Otani Ryohei. The filming took place inside a cold storage warehouse in Gyeonggi-do continuously for 7 hours. Following this, on November 1, along with the release of Part 2, the music video for the title track "Tomorrow" was released, starring Tablo and Taeyang.

== Track listing ==
All music is composed by Tablo.

Part 1
No.	Title	Lyrics	Arrangement	Length
1.	"Home" (featuring Lee So-ra)	Tablo	Jang Jae-won	4:29
2.	"Bad" (featuring Jinsil)	Tablo	Tablo	4:01
3.	"Airbag" (featuring Naul)	Tablo	Tablo	4:41
4.	"The Tide" (Scratch by DJ Friz)	Tablo	Tablo	4:21
5.	"From the Bottom" (featuring Bumkey)	Tablo	Tablo	3:25
Total length:				20:57

Part 2
No.	Title	Lyrics	Arrangement	Length
1.	"Tomorrow" (feat. Taeyang of Big Bang)	Tablo	Tablo	4:12
2.	"Source" (Scratch by DJ Tukutz)	Tablo	Tablo	3:49
3.	"Dear TV / Fever"	Tablo	Tablo	2:58
4.	"Thankful Breath" (featuring Yankie + Bong Tae-gyu)	Tablo, Yankie	Tablo, Lim Seung-hyun	3:25
5.	"Expiration Date"	Tablo	Tablo	3:59
Total length:				18:23

== Credits ==
These credits are adapted from the liner notes of the Fever's End album.

- Go Myung-jae – acoustic guitar
- Kim Nam-pyo – Artwork
- Naul, Bumkey, Bong Tae-gyu, Lee So-ra, Jinsil, Taeyang – vocals & backing vocals
- Park Asel – keyboards & synthesizer
- Yang Min-suk – executive supervisor
- Yang Hyun-suk – executive producer
- Lee Dong-geun, Lee Tae-yoon – bass guitar & double bass
- Lee Hyun-ju – design
- Lim Seung-hyun – arrangement
- Jang Sung-eun – design, creative director
- Jang Jae-won – keyboard & synthesizer, arrangement, programming
- Jung Ho-gyu – acoustic piano, keyboard & synthesizer
- Jason Robert – mixing engineer
- Cho Kyu-chan – vocal director
- Tablo – mixing engineer, vocals & backing vocals, keyboard & synthesizer, arrangement, programming, producer
- Tom Coyne – Mastering engineer
- Han Jae-eung – Mixing engineer
- DJ Tukutz, DJ Friz – Turntablism
- Mr. Sync – recording engineer, acoustic guitar, electric guitar

== Charts ==
=== Weekly charts ===
Chart (2011)	Peak position
US World Albums (Billboard)	2
South Korea (Gaon Album Chart)	12

=== Monthly charts ===
Chart (2011)	Peak position
South Korea (Gaon Album Chart)	23

=== Songs charts ===
Song	Peak chart positions	
Song	South Korea	
Song	Gaon Digital Chart	K-pop Hot 100
"Airbag"	4	5
"Bad"	3	4
"Tomorrow"	5	8

== Release history ==
Version	Country	Date	Label	Format
Fever's End Part. 1	South Korea	October 21, 2011	KMP Holdings	Compact Disc, Digital download
Fever's End Part. 2	South Korea	November 1, 2011	KMP Holdings	Compact Disc, Digital download
