= Pyongyang International House of Culture =

Cultural venue in Pyongyang, North Korea

- Location within Pyongyang
- Location: Central District, Pyongyang, North Korea
- Coordinates: 39°0′30″N 125°44′38″E
- Capacity: 120 (cinema), 600 (Yun Isang Music Hall)
- Type: Culture venue

Construction
- Opened: 2 April 1988

- Pyongyang International House of Culture
- Hangul: 평양국제문화회관
- Hanja: 平壤國際文化会館
- RR: Pyeongyang gukje munhwa hoegwan
- MR: P'yŏngyang kukche munhwa hoegwan

External image
- Photo of the exterior

Pyongyang International House of Culture, also known as the Pyongyang International Cultural Center, is a cultural venue in the Central District of Pyongyang, the capital of North Korea. It was opened on 2 April 1988. It serves as venue for cultural exchange with foreigners.

== Venue ==
Architecturally it combines Korean elements with Soviet architecture. It has a glass facade. The venue has ten floors and the floor space spans 10,000 square metres (110,000 sq ft).

Rooms dedicated to different cultural activities include art exhibitions, music practice and dance rooms, including a musical instrument room with 160 national instruments from all over the world. The building houses a cinema with the capacity of 120 seats and simultaneous interpreting capabilities. There is also a banquet hall, lounge, tea shop, and offices. The venue also houses the Songhwa Art Studio, and the Organizing Committee of the April Spring Friendship Art Festival.

It houses the Yun Isang Music Institute. The Yun Isang Music Hall, home of the Isang Yun Orchestra, is adjoined to the Pyongyang International House of Culture and houses further cultural facilities. It has a capacity of 600 seats.

The ground floor houses a permanent folkcraft exhibition with tradition Korean crafts by the Korea Minye General Corporation. Over 3,000 kinds of crafts, including Koryo celadon, are on display. Koryo Cultural Tourist Company is also based in the building.

== See also ==
- List of theatres in North Korea
