= State Symphony Orchestra of the Democratic People's Republic of Korea =

- Symphony orchestra
- Native name: 조선국립교향악단
- Short name: SSO
- Former name: Central Symphony Orchestra; Symphony Orchestra of the State Arts Theatre
- Founded: 1946
- Location: Pyongyang
- Concert hall: Moranbong Theatre
- Principal conductor: Byeong-Hwa Kim
- Concertmaster: Gi-Hyeok Choi

The State Symphony Orchestra of the DPRK (SSO; Korean: 조선국립교향악단; RR: joseon gungrip gyohyangakdan) is a symphonic orchestra in North Korea and the first classical music ensemble to be established there.

== History ==
The SSO was established on 8 August 1946 with the name Central Symphony Orchestra. In January 1947, this orchestra reinforced members and incorporated with the State Arts Theatre following year. They participated not only their subscription concerts but performances of ballets and operas including the first grand opera in Korean peninsula People's Commanders composed by Sun-Nam Kim.

SSO (at that time called "Symphony Orchestra of the State Arts Theatre") became independent in 1956. In 1969, it combined with the Orchestra of the (North) Korean Arts Film Studio and recorded film scores. The SSO incorporated again with the Sea of Blood Opera Company in 1971.

In the 1970s, the SSO premiered many well-known orchestral works of North Korea, including "Arirang", Bumper Harvest comes in Cheongsan Plains, Dear House at my Hometown, Maiden on a Swing, Piano Concerto Korea is One, Violin Concerto Song of Nostalgia and Symphony The Sea of Blood.

The SSO became fully independent from other arts groups in 1980 and adopted its present name. In 1982, the SSO played Isang Yun's orchestral work Exemplum, in memoriam Kwangju for the first time in North Korea, in the presence of the composer.

The SSO has received the highest honor of North Korea, the Order of Kim Il Sung, twice beginning with May 2000.

== Repertoire, concert venues and conductors ==
SSO is only one large orchestra of Western form in North Korea but include players of improved Korean folk wind instruments, instrumental and vocal soloists and composers for itself. They play chiefly their own concert hall named Moranbong Theatre in Pyongyang.

SSO's principal conductor is Byeong-Hwa Kim since 1969. The orchestra also plays under Jeong-Gyun Kim (associate principal conductor), Ho-Yun Kim (associate principal conductor), Gwang-Seong Choi (associate conductor), Mun-Yeong Heo (associate conductor) and other guest conductors include Il-Jin Kim, Yeong-Sang Han, Jeong-Rim Jo, Jun-Mu Lee, Hong-Jae Kim and Francis Travis. SSO's concertmaster is Gi-Hyeok Choi.

== Collaboration with South Korean artists ==
In 1998, SSO played Arirang under South Korean conductor Beom-Hun Park in 'Isang Yun Reunification Concert'. Two years after, SSO visited South Korea for the first time. They played two own concerts and two 'unity' concerts with KBS Symphony Orchestra in Seoul. In 2002, SSO met again with KBS Symphony Orchestra in Pyongyang and performed together. In these concerts, SSO played first time with well-known soprano Sumi Jo, cellist Han-na Chang and other artists of South Korea.

== Recordings ==
The State Symphony Orchestra has released two compact discs containing Isang Yun's orchestral, chamber and choral works via Japanese company Camerata in the 1980s. Since 2000, they have made their own CD series via Kwangmyong Music Company, North Korea's only recording company. They only recorded domestic works until 2003.

In 2005, they recorded Dmitri Shostakovich's Symphony No. 7 for its fifteenth album released on KMC. Subtitled "Foreign Music Vol.1 (외국음악집 1)", it was North Korea's first ever all-Western classical music CD, and had the longest playing time of any domestically issued disc.

== Tours ==
The North Korean SSO planned to perform two concerts in Britain, one at the Royal Festival Hall in London and the other in Middlesbrough, in 2008. However, in September 2008, British opera singer Suzannah Clarke announced that the trip had been proposed indefinitely after the English bank sponsoring the tour cancelled due to the 2008 financial crisis.

== See also ==
- 2008 New York Philharmonic visit to North Korea
- Isang Yun Orchestra
