= AnyBand =

2007 extended play recording

EP by AnyBand (BoA, Xiah Junsu, Tablo, Jin Bora)
- Released: November 8, 2007
- Recorded: October 2007
- Genre: Pop rock
- Length: 16:10
- Label: eCell International
- Producer: Tablo

AnyBand (Korean: 애니밴드) is the K-pop EP, released by South Korean project group AnyBand. It featured three songs: "Talk Play Love," "Promise U," and "Daydream."

Musical group AnyBand is a promotional band formed by cell phone brand Samsung's Anycall, which promoted their product "AnyBand" new cell phones. Musical group AnyBand consists of BoA, Xiah Junsu, Tablo, and jazz pianist Jin Bora.

== Background ==
Anyband is the fourth Anycall music drama from Samsung, a series of music videos and commercials that promotes their cellphones with popular celebrities. This is the fourth drama/commercial following Anymotion, Anyclub, and Anystar which have featured Lee Hyori and many famous male celebrities. This is the first time since the start of this series that Samsung is working with another main model, going from Lee Hyori to BoA.

The motto for this campaign is "Talk Play Love." While most people believe that technology isolates people, Samsung opted to promote the concept that technology unites people.

== Concept ==
The nine-minute commercial was shot in Brazil, depicting a city controlled by a Big Brother-type figurehead that constantly watches over its oppressed citizens. The law is for "no talk, no play, no love," and the citizens are strictly controlled and monitored by their government. However, four individuals form a secret alliance to challenge the government's power. Their motto is "Talk, Play, Love," and they keep in contact with each other through the use of their Anycall cellphones, a possession that is closely guarded as it is illegal to possess cellphones. Escaping the police and security, they infiltrate the government's computer system and broadcast their message through their song TPL (Talk, Play, Love), also recorded using their Anycall cellphones. They later go out in the open on top of the city's high rises to send a live message through their music, "Promise U." The people follow and rise, and the oppressive government in the end is defeated.

== Performances ==
Anyband Concert was held at Central City Millennium Hall in Seoul on November 27, 2007. AnyBand sang TPL, Promise U as well as a new song, Daydream at the concert. They also gave individual solo performances. TVXQ and Epik High were also present.

The first two songs, "Talk Play Love" and "Promise U," were released on November 8, 2007. The third song "Daydream" was released on November 27, 2007, right before the Anyband Concert.

The song "Daydream" was originally sung by German pop-trio Monrose with the title "Scream."

== Track listings ==
=== Original release ===
1. "TPL (Talk, Play, Love)"
2. "Promise U"
3. "Daydream"
4. "TPL (Talk, Play, Love)" (Instrumental)
5. "Promise U" (Instrumental)

=== Re-release edition ===
1. "TPL (Talk, Play, Love)"
2. "Promise U"
3. "Daydream" (Released on November 27 coinciding with the AnyBand concert; added on the digital single as a bonus track)
4. "TPL (Talk, Play, Love)" (Instrumental)
5. "Promise U" (Instrumental)
