= Anycall Haptic =

Mobile phone model

The Anycall Haptic is a touch phone developed by South Korean mobile phone company Anycall, a division of Samsung Group. Anycall has launched successful brands of the phone, such as Yuna's Haptic, advertised by famous South Korean skater Kim Yuna and the Haptic Amoled. SCH -W420 is an SK Telecom exclusive model and SPH-W4200 is a KT exclusive model.
