= Pieces of You (short story collection) =

2008 book by Tablo

- First edition (Korean)
- Author: Tablo
- Original title: 당신의 조각들
- Translator: Daniel Armand Lee
- Language: English
- Genre: Fiction
- Published: February 10, 2009; Byung-Sun, Kang
- Publication place: South Korea
- Media type: Hardback
- Pages: 229 pp (hardback edition)
- ISBN: 978-89-546-0757-5 (Hardback)

Pieces of You (Korean: 당신의 조각들) is a work of fiction published by Daniel Armand Lee, also known as Tablo, leader of South Korean rap group Epik High. It was published in Korean in November 2008, and in English in February 2009.

Lee's Korean translation of the book was published prior to its English counterpart and sold more than 200,000 copies, consistently ranking as a bestseller in Korea. Due to high demand, he published the original English version, Pieces of You, three months after its Korean release, and it soon became a bestseller as well.

== Overview ==
The book consists of ten short stories, all written during his college career from 1998 to 2001. Tablo says the factual setting of New York City doesn't mean much, as he added some fictitious elements into his stories. New York City could potentially be a significant reason as to why he delved into hip-hop music, as the beginning was written when he worked as an assistant director of an independent movie. All of the stories were written for class assignments during his undergraduate years, thus his audience were his professor and classmates. Some stories are very controversial and self-reflective for those readers who are in their early twenties. He recalls the pieces of memory from his youth in the prologue, excerpted below.

"My heart was closed. Cold. I was self-conscious and cynical.

These are the pieces of my youth, The small secrets and not-so-great expectations that defined my coming of age.

But through this craft, through my love for writing, I discovered a world outside of the small windowless one I had built for myself. A world of soft-spoken beauty.

So here I am, Choosing to kick away the ladder So that I may remain at your side.

I understand your solitude I see your shadow."

2009 Feb. Tablo

Both literary critics and fans conclude that the tone of this book can be summed up in the words “solitude” and “shadows,” which the author himself recalls from his youth. "Andante,” the first story, gains the most recognition. The ten stories, listed below, are arranged in the order in which they were written.

Andante: it is about the conflict between the father and the son. The son is greatly influenced by his father who is a prominent pianist, and he eventually follows the identical path as his father. Upon watching his father confront Alzheimers, he becomes more worried about his life and his family. In the end, the son becomes hopeful when his father keeps asking what song he can hear while his father's recorded version of Fur Elise is being played, and the son realizes that he can hear his father's breathing within his music.
Counting Pulses: it is a story about the son and his mother. The son is always conscious about taking care of his sick mother who needs his care even when she is in need of taking medicine. At one night, the son brings his friend to his house and they start smoking weed while the mother is in sleep. Due to excessive inhalation, the son starts suffering from a respiratory problem resulting him into a critical situation.
Break: it is a short story compared to his other stories which is about the teacher who takes a break from his students. During this short break, he starts feeling overwhelming pain; here the word "break" literally means a break which he has now, but it can also mean the life and the condition that he is in, which breaks him.
The Rat: this is a story where the casting director of a movie with nude scenes invites the main actress to his house. As he invites the cast to his house, he notices that there is a big rat staying in his bedroom. He becomes paranoid of the fact that there is a big rat in his bedroom which it reminds him of the girl.
Matchbox: it is a story about the son who starts smoking due to his father who is a chain-smoker. He starts smoking when he is six and he quits smoking at the age of twenty-five when he realizes how horrible cigarettes are for his health.
A Glass of Victory: it is a story about the conflict between two friends. The main character attends the high school reunion where he meets his rival during the students' president election. He is ridiculed and disgusted by the resemblance of his friend and his son. Suddenly, he recalls the high school student's president election, where he lost to him by a little, but the difference in votes has never been revealed. After he meets the janitor from high school accidentally, he hears from him that there were some votes thrown out inside the garbage. He realizes how his rival cheated on the election, and he goes up to him and punches his face, but he loses miserably in fight again.
The Walls of Our World: this story explores the internal, almost insuppressible lust within all humankind, regardless of the masks of occupation, status, and position in the social hierarchy.
Hate Crime: it is a story about the Asian identity as seen by Caucasian culture. The story comments on the lack of differentiation, and ignorance towards the different ethnicities within the US-Asian population.
Coup de Grace: this story portrays how a cowardly father forces his son to become a strong and brave person. By creating himself into a completely different person, he doesn't only deceive himself but he also deceives even his family members. In the end, the coward turns out to be not his son but himself.
Strawberry Fields Forever: this story portrays the fast-paced nature of our life, for instance, how things bypass us so quickly that we sometimes forget to appreciate their value.

== Reception ==
Byung Ryul Lee, a well-known poet and prose writer for his bestseller Attraction, commented on Tablo's book in a blurb, found on the back of both the Korean and English versions. He says the book allowed him to understand the author better: “The first thought that crossed my head after reading his book was my spark of awareness of how lonely and solitude life that the author, Tablo had prolonged.” Lee's critics directly depicts Tablo's work from his perspective as he addressed: “It reminds me of his panic-state of his youth which is difficult to hold up regardless of many effortless trials, and throughout this book, I felt that I became aware of his profound inner mind as well. ... This book softly embraces those who reluctantly live their lives without acknowledging the true colors of each of the individuals. ...While reading his novel, I was able to know this person, and simultaneously I happened to learn many things that I had very little knowledge of.” Lee addresses this novel as more than just a celebrity's book, as it actually made him reflect his 20s, and how he has changed from then.

Tablo is a survivor. I could imagine the young man in his early twenties, in a vacuum of confusion and loneliness, struggling to grasp the ungraspable. I almost felt like a voyeur, peeping into his innermost emotions. His stories offer a warm hand to the shoulders of anyone who is lost, anyone who is struggling to discover the subversive concept of 'self'. The cracks and crevices between his sentences and words hold an intensity that landslides the heart. I feel that I've learned many things about Tablo's internal world, and I'm thankful that he has decided to share it with the world. - Lee Byung-ryul (Poet, Author of 『Attraction』)

Slices of time, silent and gentle. Yet, an intense emotional storm brews within. Concisely written, but written with deep warmth. Breathtakingly painful in its beauty. Tablo is an admirable writer. - Lee Juck (Musician, Author of 『The Fingerprint Hunter』)
