= Suzannah Clarke =

English opera singer and politician (born 1970)

Personal details
- Born: 1970 (age 55–56) Normanby, North Yorkshire, England
- Party: Labour
- Education: Teesside University (BA); Royal Northern College of Music
- Occupation: Opera singer
- Known for: First British singer to perform in Pyongyang, North Korea; Founder of Tutu Peace Garden, London

Suzannah Clarke (born 1970) is a British opera singer and politician. In 2003, she became the first British singer to perform in Pyongyang, North Korea, and was invited back several times. A soprano, she has also sung at La Scala in Milan, the Hungarian State Opera House in Budapest, and with English National Opera, Welsh National Opera, and Scottish Opera. In addition, she has performed anthems at football matches and international tournaments such as the UEFA Euro 1996 at Wembley Stadium. In the noughties, she chaired a successful initiative to bring the BBC Proms Last Night of the Proms to Middlesbrough in 2007. She also founded the Heavy Metal Opera Choir, a men's chorus of steelworkers from Corus Group in Redcar. In 2019, she was recognised as one of the "100 North East heroes" in the Sunday Sun newspaper as part of its centenary celebrations.

First elected in 2018 for the Labour Party, Clarke currently serves as one of the local councillors for Grove Park, Lewisham. She was previously the London regional manager for the National Society of Epilepsy. Her other projects in London have included the creation of the Tutu Peace Garden in Lewisham honouring Desmond Tutu.

== Early life and education ==
Clarke was born and raised in Normanby in North Yorkshire. Her mother Sheelagh Clarke was a councillor and deputy leader of Redcar and Cleveland Council. Her great-grandfather was the last official rat catcher at ICI Billingham. Growing up, she was a supporter of Middlesbrough F.C. She was a member of the Labour Party since the 1990s.

She graduated from Teesside University in 1992 with a degree in business studies. As part of the degree programme, she worked at British Steel in Redcar. Clarke then studied at the Royal Northern College of Music. She received an honorary master of arts degree in 2003.

== Career ==
=== Opera ===
Clarke trained with Luciano Pavarotti's singing teacher Arrigo Pola in Modena, Italy. She was a principal soprano with the English National Opera, and performed for one season at La Scala in Milan. She has sung leading roles in operas such as The Marriage of Figaro, The Magic Flute, and Carmen.

==== Football stadiums ====
On 30 April 1995, Clarke sang a collection of songs at Farewell To Ayresome Park, a concert commemorating the final competitive match played at the stadium before it closed. She has called it the most emotional performance of her career.

In 1996, Clarke sang at the opening ceremony for UEFA Euro 1996 at Wembley Stadium in London. In 2001, Clarke sang the Albanian national anthem when Albania played against England at Riverside Stadium in Middlesbrough. In 2003, she sang the Slovak national anthem.

==== Concerts in North Korea ====
In 2002, Clarke was appointed a cultural ambassador for Middlesbrough. That year, she hosted a visit from seven surviving members of the North Korea national football team, who had played at Ayresome Park during the 1966 FIFA World Cup. The North Korean players, who played in red like Middlesbrough, had endeared themselves to the local community, who celebrated wildly when North Korea unexpectedly defeated Italy. Clarke greeted the former players in Korean and sung a Korean friendship song. Following their visit to Middlesbrough, she received her first invitation to North Korea.

In 2003, Clarke became the first British singer to perform in Pyongyang, North Korea. Her itinerary included five concerts as part of its annual Spring Arts Friendship Festival. Her repertoire for the trip included opera pieces as well as musical theatre songs by Andrew Lloyd Webber, and traditional Northumbrian songs. After her initial visit, which was endorsed by the Foreign Office and filmed by the BBC, she was invited back annually until 2007.

In 2007, Clarke's performance in front of a theatre audience of 2,000 was due to be broadcast to 23 million people on North Korea's only television station. Other events on her two-week itinerary included attendance at the Arirang Mass Games celebrating the birthday of dictator Kim Jong Il. Her standard encore during her performances in North Korea was "Danny Boy", which she said received "a huge round of applause and a standing ovation each time". In an interview with The Times, Clarke explained that she was "[using] opera to keep the channels of communication open between North Korea and the West", stating, "I do not condone anything that is against human rights".

==== Reception ====
The Times review of a 1999 English National Opera production of Orfeo by Monteverdi said that "Suzannah Clarke was a sympathetic Eurydice". Another Times review of a European Chamber Opera production of L'elisir d'amore by Donizetti at Holland Park said, "The coy and capricious Adina is also strongly cast: Suzannah Clarke really laughs her way through Donizetti's music".

In a 2004 review of her performance at the Bord Gis Opera Gala at the National Concert Hall in Dublin, The Irish Times said: "British soprano Suzannah Clarke has a well-schooled voice that holds a smooth line and tackles light coloratura with ease. She also displayed theatrical awareness in arias and duets from Faust, Lucia di Lammermoor and Rigoletto where she put across the characters' vulnerability admirably."

=== Concert production ===
In the noughties, Clarke chaired a project to bring the last night of The BBC Proms to North East England. In 2007, her three-year project culminated in a Proms in the Park concert in Middlesbrough. However, Clarke herself decided not to perform due to her pregnancy.

During one visit to North Korea, Clarke had suggested that her hosts should send their orchestra overseas and invite other foreign musicians to North Korea. They agreed, and on 26 February 2008, the New York Philharmonic performed a concert in Pyongyang, an unprecedented event. Clarke worked on organising a concert tour for the North Korea State Symphony Orchestra to visit the United Kingdom, and after years of planning, the orchestra was scheduled to perform at the Royal Festival Hall in London and in Middlesbrough on 17 and 19 September 2008. However, on 4 September, The Korea Times reported that the tour had been postponed indefinitely after the English bank retracted its sponsorship at the last minute due to the 2008 credit crunch.

=== Politics ===
In 2004, Clarke chaired a conference of educators including headteachers and teaching staff in Middlesbrough organised by the union UNISON and the Northeast Consortium of Local Authorities. That year, she was involved in the "Yes for the North East" campaign in the 2004 North East England devolution referendum, which was rejected.

In February 2005, Clarke announced that she was putting her opera career on hold to stand for Parliament. She turned down the lead role in Donizetti's La fille du régiment and expressed interest in the Bishop Auckland seat which was becoming vacant the following year. In 2007, Clarke ran unsuccessfully for the Labour candidacy for Stockton North. In 2010, she launched a bid for the Labour candidacy for Middlesbrough South and East Cleveland, but failed to reach the long list.

In the 2018 Lewisham London Borough Council election, Clarke was elected as a local councillor for Grove Park, an electoral ward in Lewisham. She was re-elected in 2022 and 2026.

== Other projects ==
Clarke has served on the boards of many organisations such as the South Tees Hospitals NHS Trust, and was a patron of the trust's Healing Arts Project. She was a patron of Zoe's Place, a children's hospice. She has also sung in, and organised, numerous charity concerts over the years, and participated in musical outreach programmes for children.

=== Heavy Metal Opera Choir ===
In the noughties, Clarke tutored the Heavy Metal Opera Choir, a men's choir made up of steelworkers from Corus in Redcar. The choir was formed when Clarke realised she needed a choir to sing with her in Blaze!, a 2004 community opera about the railway heritage of Darlington, performed on a station platform at the railway museum there.

Clarke and the eight-man choir from Redcar also performed "The Red Flag" and "Jerusalem" at the annual Labour Party Conference in Brighton in 2004.

=== Tutu Peace Garden ===
Clarke founded the Tutu Peace Garden in Chinbrook Meadows Park in Lewisham, London, honouring South African bishop and anti-apartheid activist Desmond Tutu, which Tutu himself opened during a ceremony in 2009. She came up with the idea after confirming with the South African High Commission that in the 1970s, Tutu and his family had lived in her house in Lewisham, and inviting Tutu to tea and cakes. Tutu had then surprised her by calling her directly to accept the invitation. The garden was designed by garden designer Chris Beardshaw.

== Personal life ==
Around the turn of the century, Clarke bought a house in Lewisham, London. She is now based in Lewisham, where she lives with her partner. They have two daughters. She has maintained strong ties to the Teesside area, even after moving to London.

In 1996, Clarke was diagnosed with epilepsy after collapsing while on tour in Italy. The diagnosis was weeks before she was due to sing at the opening of the UEFA European Championship, which was held in England. She did not go public about her condition for several years, concerned about the impact on her career. In 2013, she gave an exclusive interview to Sunday Sun about her condition to raise awareness for epilepsy, noting other successful individuals such as Neil Young who have lived with and managed the condition. She has worked as a regional manager for the National Society for Epilepsy.
