= Grove Park (ward) =

Electoral ward in London, England

- Electoral ward for the Lewisham London Borough Council
- Borough: Lewisham
- County: Greater London
- Population: 15,730 (2021)
- Major settlements: Grove Park, Lewisham
- Area: 2.432 km²

Current electoral ward
- Created: 1965
- Councillors: 3 (since 2002); 2 (until 2002)

Grove Park is an electoral ward in the Borough of Lewisham. The ward was first used in the 1964 elections and elects three councillors to Lewisham London Borough Council.

== Geography ==
The ward is named after the Grove Park, Lewisham area.

== Councillors ==
Election	Councillors		
2022	Suzannah Clarke (Labour)	Mark Jackson (Labour)	Hilary Moore (Labour)

== Elections ==
=== 2022 ===
Grove Park (3)
Party	Candidate	Votes	%	±%
Labour	Suzannah Clarke*	1,750	58.7	
Labour	Hilary Moore*	1,502	50.4	
Labour	Mark Jackson	1,464	49.1	
Conservative	Helena Croft	935	31.4	
Conservative	Favour Obi	694	23.3	
Conservative	Sergiy Lesyk	676	22.7	
Green	Angela Minto	617	20.7	
Liberal Democrats	Annie Kirby	533	17.9	
Green	Michael Thompson	425	14.3	
Liberal Democrats	Martin Passande	343	11.5	
Turnout			31.0	
Labour hold		Swing		
Labour hold		Swing		
Labour hold		Swing		
