= Kim Il-jin =

North Korean musician (born 1956)

Kim Il-jin (Korean: 김일진, born 1956) is a North Korean conductor.

He was born in Manpo, a city of Jagang Province, but he grew up mainly in Wonsan. He studied cello in Pyongyang University of Music and Dance.

After graduating in 1977, Kim joined the Mansudae Art Troupe as a cellist but he turned to conducting shortly after. He went to Russia and studied conducting at the Moscow Conservatory.

In 1985, Kim participated in the Herbert von Karajan International Conductors Competition in West Berlin and took second prize. He is the only North Korean to have won this competition.

After returning to North Korea, Kim rejoined the Mansudae Art Troupe as a conductor. He also rehearsed the Troupe's famous Merited Female Instrumental Ensemble and founded the Isang Yun Orchestra in North Korea.

Kim received a title of Merited Artist in 1988.

Kim is currently married to Merited Actress Kim Yong-suk.
