= Kim Hong-jae =

Korean Japanese musician (born 1954)

- Born: October 10, 1954; Itami, Japan
- Occupation: conductor

Korean name
- Hangul: 김홍재
- Hanja: 金洪才
- RR: Gim Hongjae
- MR: Kim Hongjae

Kim Hong-jae (김홍재; born October 10, 1954) is a Zainichi Korean conductor.

== Early life ==
His first experience with music at an early age was on an upright piano at his mother's maiden home. In 1967, he entered Amagasaki Korean Middle School and studied clarinet in the school band. He also studied improved Korean folk instruments sent from North Korea. In 1969, the School Band of Amagasaki Korean Middle School won the grand prize of 'Competition of Korean Students Resident in Japan' under his direction.

In 1973, Kim entered the Toho Gakuen School of Music as one of the first Korean nationals. He changed his clarinet major to conducting and studies under Ken Takaseki and Naoto Otomo in 1975. Before his graduation in 1977, he attended the classes of, among others, Seiji Ozawa, Kazuyoshi Akiyama, Tadashi Mori and Shunsaku Tsutsumi. Upon Tsutsumi's recommendation, he was appointed as resident conductor of the Tokyo City Philharmonic Orchestra while he was studying at Toho. In 1977, he conducted the Toho Orchestra with Seiji Ozawa on the podium at Toho Gakuen's graduation concert.

== Début, competition, and television concerts ==
After graduation, Kim made his official début with the Tokyo City Philharmonic Orchestra on March 22, 1978, at Shibuya Public Hall, Tokyo. This concert, titled 'Special Concert of (North) Korean Orchestral Works,' got a sensational response-not only as the first conductor of Korean nationality but also as the première of any work in Japan.

In the following year, he participated in the Tokyo International Conductors' Competition and was awarded the second prize, along with a special prize named after Hideo Saito. In that same year, he was invited by North Korea to conduct the State Symphony Orchestra of DPRK. In 1980, he conducted concerts featuring prizewinners from Hokkaidō to Kyūshū.

Kim was appointed as the conductor of a television program titled 'Here comes the orchestra' of Tokyo Broadcasting System(TBS) with Kazushi Ono and Deryck Inoue in 1980. In the following year, he also conducted another television program titled 'My Concert' of Nippon Television(NTV). During these two years, he conducted numerous works from Bach to Shostakovich and accompanied many well-known soloists, including Hiroko Nakamura, Mitsuko Uchida, Toshia Eto, Ko Iwasaki, Jean-Yves Thibaudet and Mikhail Pletnev with two regular orchestras, the New Japan Philharmonic and the Yomiuri Nippon Symphony Orchestra, as well as orchestras from other cities'.

In 1981, Kim became the principal guest conductor of Tokyo City Philharmonic Orchestra. His other important positions were principal guest conductor of the Nagoya Philharmonic Orchestra since 1985 and the principal guest conductor of the Kyoto Symphony Orchestra since 1987. In 1987, he toured with the Kyoto Symphony Orchestra in Pyongyang and Wonsan, marking the first appearance of a Japanese orchestra in North Korea. He also performed in Beijing with the China Broadcasting Symphony Orchestra (now the China Philharmonic Orchestra) in 1988.

== Meetings with Isang Yun ==
Kim met the composer Isang Yun in 1986 and became an admirer of his music. He conducted Yun's first work Exemplum, in memoriam Kwangju on stage of '1st Hankyore Concert' in April 1989. He resigned three orchestras' positions and went to Germany in September. He studied Yun's works with the composer himself.

In 1990, he participated in the 'Pan-Nation Unification Concert' held in Pyongyang and conducted Yun's Fanfare und Memorial in the presence of the composer. And in 1992, Kim appeared at the '75th Birthday Celebration Festival of Isang Yun' held in Tokyo and conducted Yun's Third Symphony' premiered in Japan. Kim conducted more than pieces of Yun's works, which premiered in Japan, and was highly praised by the composer.

== Crossover, Hankyoreh Concert, and other appearances ==
Kim's activities were not only formal classical concerts but also crossover and concerts of Korean residents in Japan, including the Hankyoreh Concert (1989–1993). He introduced many North and South Korean songs and orchestral works, including those produced by his maternal uncle, Cheol-Woo Lee. The 8th Hankyore Concert was held in Carnegie Hall of New York City in September 1992, which was also Kim's début concert in the US.

He also met Joe Hisaishi, a well-known composer of Hayao Miyazaki and Takeshi Kitano's film music, with whom he appeared in many concerts together since 1991. Kim also conducted crossover concerts with Jazz musicians including Aiko Takahashi and Terumasa Hino. And he conducted many concert bands in Japan, including Tokyo Kosei Wind Orchestra and Osaka Municipal Symphonic Band, of which he was a principal conductor from 1991 to 1994. In 1998, he conducted opening ceremony of 7th Winter Paralympic Games held in Nagano (produced by Hisaishi.) Following this appearance, he received music prize named after Akeo Watanabe and became the only one that won two grand prizes for Japanese conductor at that time.

== First appearance in South Korea ==
Kim and South Korean violinist Jeong Chan-Woo held a concert named 'Unity Concert' in June 2000. This concert was previously planned in 1985, but the South Korean Ministry of Foreign Affairs did not approve of Jeong's departure to Japan due to his North Korean nationality. Thus, this concert was a famous event not only for Korean residents in Japan but also in South Korea. In October 2000, he visited South Korea for the first time for the ASEM Music Festival held in Seoul where he conducted Isang Yun's Muak and the Asian premiere of Ferruccio Busoni's Piano Concerto played by the well-known pianist Baek Geon-Woo (Kun-Woo Paik) and the KBS Symphony Orchestra.

At that time Kim still held North Korean nationality. Howecer, he switched to South Korean nationality in August 2005.

By this time, Kim had conducted nearly all orchestras in Japan except the NHK Symphony Orchestra. He conducts not only professional but also university, citizen's and other amateur orchestras and concert bands. And he appeared at several concerts of KBS Symphony Orchestra, the Korean Symphony Orchestra and the National Orchestra of Korea in South Korea.

Since November 2007, Kim has been appointed to his very first position in South Korea as the principal conductor of the Ulsan Symphony Orchestra.

== Bibliography ==
- "Hong-Jae Kim, I Conducts Fate (김홍재, 나는 운명을 지휘한다)" by Hong-Jae Kim (dictate) & Seong-Mi Park (editor), Gimm-Young Publishers, Inc. (Korean only) ISBN 89-349-0618-9
