= Pyongyang University of Music and Dance =

University in North Korea

Coordinates: 39.0194°N 125.7899°E

- 평양음악무용대학
- Type: Public
- Established: July 1972; 54 years ago
- Location: Pyongyang, North Korea
- Location within North Korea

The Pyongyang University of Music and Dance is a North Korean performing arts university founded in July 1972 in the Taedonggang District of Pyongyang from a merge with the Pyongyang Art College. Its facilities include a full orchestra and a music hall covering 5,501 square meters. 30 percent of the university's teachers have academic degrees and titles.

The university's education system consists of four- to five-year regular courses and two- to three-year special courses. There is also an additional 2-year kindergarten course, 4 year primary course and a 3-year preparatory course for young musicians and performers.

Originally the Pyongyang Dance College, founded on March 1, 1949, the university merged with the Pyongyang Art College in 1972 to become the Pyongyang University of Music and Dance. Its newly developed buildings saw the "on-the-spot" guidance of Kim Il Sung and Kim Jong Il whilst being built.

== Departments ==
- National instrumental music
- Modern instrumental music
- Vocal music
- Dance and composition (practical and theory)

== Notable alumni ==
- Jo Myung-Ae
- Cheol Woong Kim
- Il-Jin Kim
- Kim Ok

== See also ==
- List of universities in North Korea
