= Tablo =

Canadian rapper (born 1980)

- 타블로
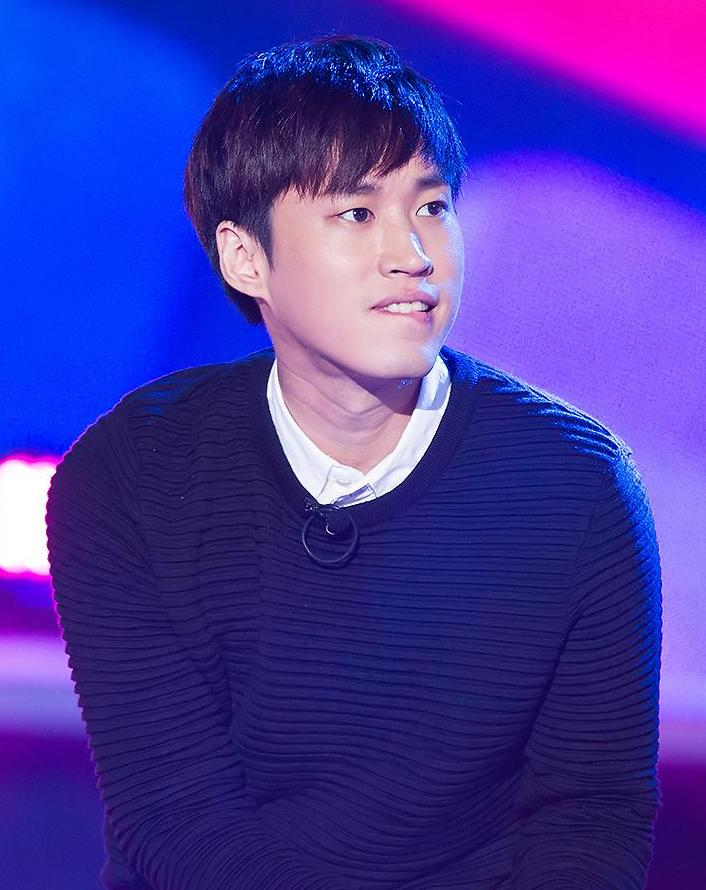
- Tablo in 2014
- Born: Daniel Seonwoong Lee; July 22, 1980 (age 46); Seoul, South Korea
- Other name: Supreme T
- Citizenship: Canada (c. 1992–present)
- Education: Stanford University (BA, MA)
- Occupations: Rapper; songwriter; record producer
- Spouse: Kang Hye-jung (m. 2009)
- Children: One
- Musical career
- Genre: Hip hop
- Instruments: Vocals; keyboards
- Years active: 1997–present
- Labels: Woollim; YG; Highgrnd; William Morris; Ours; Ryce
- Member of: Epik High
- Formerly of: Anyband

Korean name
- Hangul: 이선웅
- RR: I Seonung
- MR: I Sŏnung

Daniel Seonwoong Lee (Korean: 대니얼 선웅 리; born July 22, 1980), better known by his stage name Tablo (타블로), is a Canadian rapper, songwriter and record producer based in South Korea. Tablo is best known as the leader and producer of South Korean hip-hop group Epik High, and the founder of independent music label Highgrnd, which housed bands Hyukoh and The Black Skirts.

Tablo became employed as a lyricist while still in high school. Under the supervision of Tobias Wolff, Tablo graduated from Stanford University with honors in English literature and creative writing. He then moved to South Korea, where, in 2001, he formed Epik High alongside DJ Tukutz and Mithra Jin. The group has since released 10 full-length albums and 1 EP, with Tablo having produced and co-written all the songs. His debut solo album, Fever's End, was released in 2011.

Outside of Epik High, Tablo is a record producer and songwriter for other artists and involved in collaborative projects such as Borderline, Eternal Morning, and Anyband. His music incorporates numerous styles, ranging from trance, trip hop, to rock. Tablo is also the author of the best-selling book Pieces of You, published in both English and Korean, and Blonote. He made his film debut acting in Nonstop (2005). In 2016, Tablo left his radio show, MBC FM4U's Tablo's Dreaming Radio, after eleven years to focus on YG's music sub-label Highgrnd.

== Life and career ==
=== 1980–2003: Early life and career beginnings ===
Tablo moved to Jakarta, Indonesia in 1980 shortly after his birth. Due to his father's work, he spent around 3 years living in Jakarta before his family relocated again several times to Switzerland and Hong Kong for his father's career until Tablo was six, when they returned to South Korea briefly. His family moved again to Canada when he was eight, and he gained Canadian citizenship at age 12. Tablo attended St. George's School in Vancouver, British Columbia. He then transferred to Seoul International School. As a coterminal student at Stanford University, Tablo simultaneously attained a Bachelor's Degree in English literature and a Master's Degree in creative writing in four years.

Tablo started playing piano at the age of six but later switched to violin, which he played for 10 years. His music teacher, who had been a pupil of Isaac Stern, used to lecture him saying: "Music is communism, but you're playing democracy". Tablo wrote the lyrics to legendary singer Kim Gun-mo's song "Rainy Christmas" when he was sixteen years old, as Kim took an interest in Tablo after reading a poem of his.

During his early life, Tablo suffered from bouts of depression. Whenever he faced hardship, hip hop music served as an outlet. However, Tablo's father disapproved of his career choice, so as a teenager, he frequently ran away from home. Ostensibly, Tablo asked a friend to live out his dream, but when that friend died of cancer, it became an impetus for him to re-enter the music industry. Tablo later admitted his family forced him to enroll in Stanford, and even after the release of his second album, was still persuading him to return to the United States to attend Law School. While he was at Stanford, Tablo associated with an underground hip hop group, 4n Objectz.

=== 2003–10: Success with Epik High and Pieces of You ===
Tablo met future bandmates Mithra Jin and DJ Tukutz while active in the underground hip-hop scene. The three came together to form Epik High, with Tablo as their leader. Under the tutelage of Movement crew members, especially the trio CB Mass, they attempted to record their first studio album alongside hip-hop duo and close friends TBNY (composed of Yankie and TopBob); however, CB Mass member Curbin allegedly embezzled Epik High and TBNY's funds for the album, effectively causing the disbandment of CB Mass (and the creation of Dynamic Duo without Curbin). Tablo and Epik High were finally signed by Woollim Entertainment, which at the time focused on underground hip hop and modern rock, and the group officially debuted in 2003. The group's first album, Map of the Human Soul, was released on October 21 of that year; however, due to hip hop's lack of popularity in South Korea at the time, the album was a commercial failure. It wasn't until the release of their second album, High Society, that the group started to gain popularity. Epik High's third album, Swan Songs, was originally intended to be their last album; however, upon release, the album reached the top of numerous charts, and swept the year-end hip-hop awards. One of the lead singles from the album, "Fly", was featured on the soundtrack of the video game FIFA 07. Due to the numerous offers to remake "Fly", as well as "Paris", the second single from the album, a CD sampler was released in Japan.

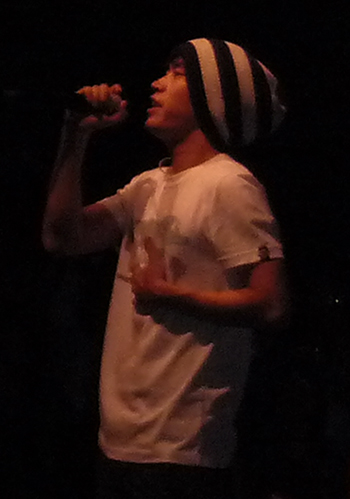
Tablo at Map the Soul Concert, San Francisco (2009)

In 2007, the group released their fourth studio album, Remapping the Human Soul, and managed to push Epik High to the number one spot for best upcoming artist after selling almost 90,000 copies in the first month of release. The album ended up becoming South Korea's third best-selling album of 2007. However, many songs from the album were banned from several TV channels, and the album buying age was restricted to 19+ due to some songs dealing with issues the Ministry of Culture and Tourism in South Korea deemed inappropriate for younger listeners. The group later went on to release their next album, Pieces, Part One, which was also a commercial success.

In late 2008, Tablo published a book entitled Pieces of You. Although the stories were originally written in English, the book was first published in Korean. The Korean translation sold 50,000 copies in its first week of release and topped the bestseller's list in Korea. The original English version was released in February 2009 and also met with moderate success. The book garnered a positive reception from critics, with Tablo's writing praised for a first-time author. After the group's contract with Woolim Entertainment expired in 2008, Tablo, alongside his group members, founded their own independent label, Map the Soul, and went on to release an album of the same name. Through their independent label, the group went on to release two more albums; [e] in 2009, and Epilogue in 2010. In November 2013, Tablo revealed in his interview with HiphopLE that "Map the Soul" was shut down due to one of its executive member embezzling the label's funds.

=== 2010–11: Musical hiatus and Stanford ===
In 2010, it was announced that Epik High would go on hiatus after DJ Tukutz enlisted in his mandatory military service, whilst Tablo and Mithra would be working on solo careers until DJ Tukutz's return. However, in mid-2010, a group of Internet users raised doubts about the academic background of Tablo, who majored in English and Creative Writing at Stanford University. Led by two fan sites, most notably "We Demand the Truth from Tablo" (Korean: 타블로에게 진실을 요구합니다), some netizens claimed that Tablo could not have graduated from Stanford University with both a bachelor's degree and master's degree in English and Creative Writing, respectively, in just three and a half years.

It became front-page news in South Korea in June 2010 when one of the fansite's managers, who went by the username "whatbecomes", claimed that Tablo's academic record was "not making any sense" and showed what he believed to be inconsistencies in Tablo's transcripts. Even though Tablo posted his official transcript and other legal documents online, many netizens refused to believe him, and called for other documents such as his immigration statement and diploma to be released. Tablo visited Stanford University in late August to disprove these allegations by having the university registrar re-print his documents on camera, and many of Tablo's acquaintances and former professors from Stanford attested to the validity of his academic background on camera. The documentary was shown in two parts: Tablo Goes to Stanford and Tablo and South Korea Online, which aired on MBC October 1 and 8. However, despite the documentary and Stanford's administration clearly siding with Tablo, membership at "We Demand the Truth from Tablo" increased to as many as 190,000 within a few days, as numerous netizens refused to believe Tablo or the documentary. Tablo and members of his family received death threats and he became a virtual recluse. Tablo ultimately left Woollim Entertainment during the Tajinyo incident, not wanting to spread harm to the agency or to Infinite, who had only recently debuted when the controversy broke out.

On October 9, however, police confirmed that Tablo had indeed graduated from Stanford, having requested information beyond what Tablo had already provided, directly from Stanford University. South Korean police filed an arrest warrant domestically and with Interpol for the arrest of "whatbecomes", who was revealed to be a 57-year-old Korean-American named Eungsuk Kim living in the United States. In addition, twenty-two netizens received summons indicating they had been sued by Tablo for criminal defamation. The fansite was shut down soon after by its host site, Naver, following the results of the investigation, which also revealed that whatbecomes had fraudulently used a friend's ID number to create the website, violating Naver's terms of service. However, many members of the fansite joined another community called "We Demand the Truth from Tablo 2" (타블로에게 진실을 요구합니다2), which has a membership of over 33,000 netizens despite proof provided by both the university and the police that Tablo did indeed graduate from Stanford University.

=== 2011–present: Return, solo career and Epik High comeback ===
On September 27, 2011, YG Entertainment announced that Tablo would be signing a 4-year contract with them and that his first solo album would be released on November 1. Although Tablo signed as a solo singer under YG Entertainment, he indicated that it did not mean that Epik High disbanded, nor that they would necessarily sign with YG as a group. On October 14, 2011, Tablo released the song "Airbag" from his new upcoming album. On October 21, 2011, YG announced that the new album, titled Fever's End (열꽃), had been split into two parts. The first part was released along with the recent announcement, and the second part was released on the planned release date.

On September 27, 2012, YG officially announced through yg-life.com that Epik High would have their comeback in October 2012, after a three-year hiatus as a group. Their first single, "춥다" ("It's Cold"), featured SBS's K-pop Star finalist Lee Hi and was released on October 9, while their comeback album, titled 99, was released on the 19th. On December 30, 2012, during the SBS Gayo Daejun, Tablo joined fellow Epik High bandmate Mithra Jin, Dynamic Duo and Simon D for Cypher 2012, a remix of popular hip hop tracks of the year, to much acclaim.

In October 2013, Tablo joined KBS variety show The Return of Superman with his daughter Haru.

On April 21, 2014, Tablo returned as radio DJ. His show's name is Tablo's Dreaming Radio. He was the DJ for this same program until 2016.

In March 2014, Tablo carried out a collaboration with China's top female singer Bibi Zhou.

On October 18, 2014, Epik High released their music video for "Born Hater", after the video was delayed by YG due to the Pangyo Techno Valley Festival Tragedy. The track is from their eighth album, Shoebox, and features a myriad of hip hop artists including Beenzino, Verbal Jint, Mino of Winner, along with B.I and Bobby of iKon.

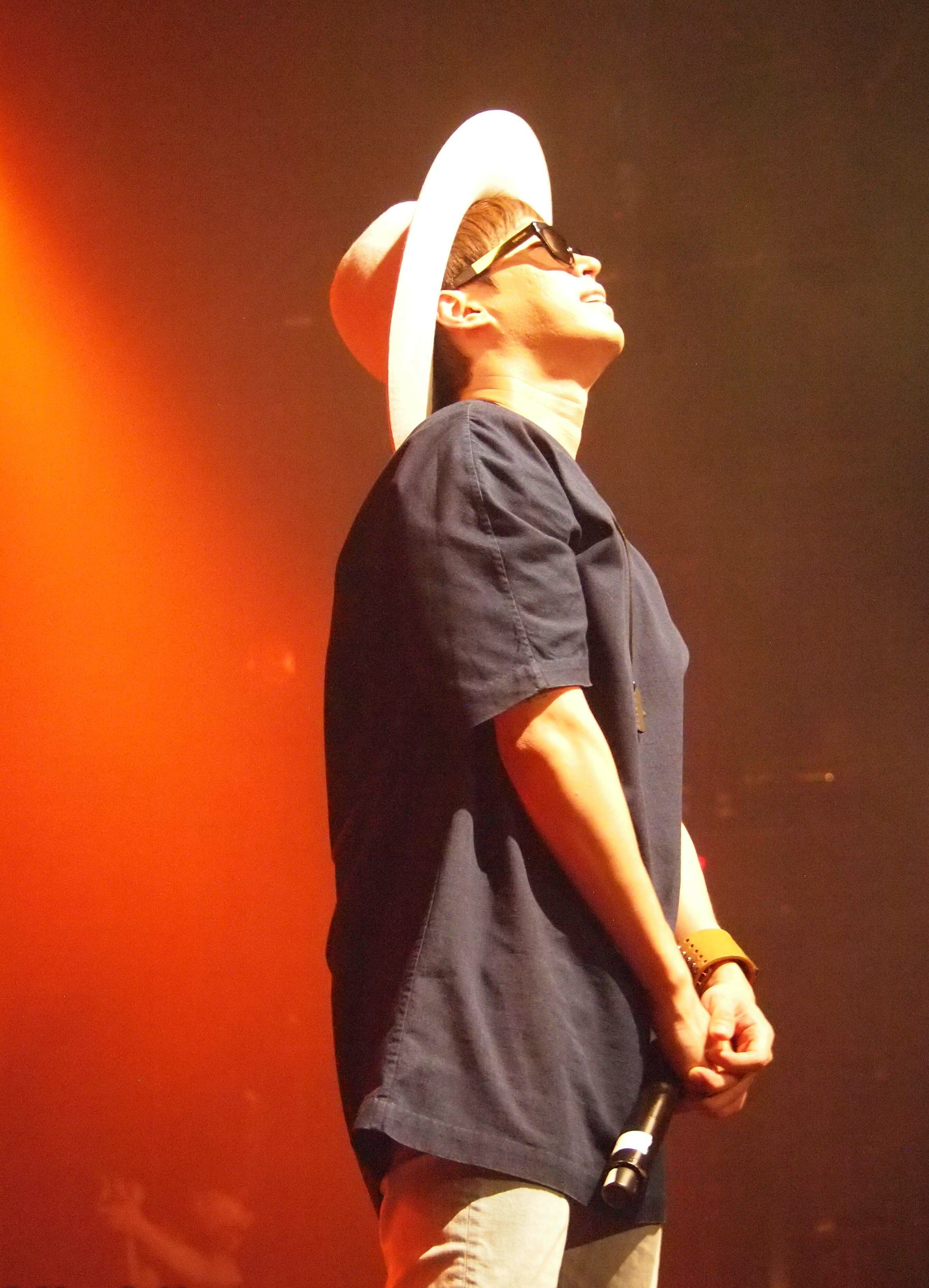
2015 North American Tour, New York City

On August 31, 2015, Tablo released a teaser clip for a collaboration track with American rapper and co-founder of Pro Era, Joey Badass. Their collaborated song, "Hood," was released September 5, 2015.

On January 26, 2017, he collaborated with Gallant and Eric Nam on the single release of "Cave Me In", and music video which was shot in Hong Kong. "Cave Me In" premiered worldwide on Zane Lowe's Beats 1 Radio Show and was trending globally on YouTube and Facebook for over 72 hours upon releasing.

In 2021, he was featured in B.I's song "STAY".

In September 2022, he collaborated with Jackson Wang for a new track "Imagine" on the hip-pop competition series, Rap Of China.

== Personal life ==
Tablo married Korean actress Kang Hye-jung on October 26, 2009. Their daughter Haru was born in May 2010. Tablo has an older sister, Lee Sun-joo, who graduated from Cornell University and an older brother, Lee Sun-Min, who graduated from Brown University and Columbia University.

== Musical style ==
Tablo has been a long-time fan of hip hop music, citing an almost lifelong affair with the culture itself. While listening to hip hop at an early age through artists such as Run-D.M.C. and acquiring Cold Crush tapes, he concurrently gained recognition as a rhymer. His major and enduring love affair with making hip hop music was sparked later in life, however; after hearing Drunken Tiger rapping, the group Epik High was formed in 2000 at an early time in the culture's local evolution. Tablo has since claimed to be the first emcee to have used the "rhyming rifle" technique. With the hip hop scene in Korea and Korean emcees being known for their fickle tendencies, Tablo has through the years kept alive his legacy and career through numerous shows, appearances on influential overseas (American most notably) hip hop artists work, such as EPMD.

== Writing ==
In 2008, Tablo published a collection of short stories he had written, titled Pieces of You. The English translation was published in 2009. In 2016, his second book "BloNote" was published in Korea with a pink book cover. The English version, translated by Tablo himself and with a black cover, was published on December 21, 2016.

== Podcast ==
On June 8, 2019, Tablo posted on his personal Instagram posing the question: "What if Tablo had an English-language podcast?". The podcast premiered with the release of three episodes on August 8, 2019. The Tablo Podcast is produced by Dive Studios. The last episode of The Tablo Podcast aired on September 4, 2020, though two follow-up episodes were released in 2021 to promote the release of Epik High Is Here. Five years later, Tablo launched a new podcast called "Hey Tablo". Its first episode premiered on January 13, 2026.

== Filmography ==
=== Films ===
| Year | Title | Role | Notes |
|---|---|---|---|
| 2007 | Fantastic Parasuicides | Min-ho | Main role |
| 2007 | August Rush | Clarinet player | Cameo appearance; uncredited |

=== Television ===
| Year | Title | Role | Notes |
|---|---|---|---|
| 2004 | Epik High's Love and Delusion | Himself | Series regular |
| 2005 | Nonstop | Tablo | Main role; season 5 |
| 2007 | High Kick! | Teacher | Cameo appearance (Episode 150) |
| 2008 | Woman of Matchless Beauty, Park Jung-geum | Himself | Cameo appearance (Episodes 7 & 8) |
| 2008 | Music Bank | Co-host | Alongside Kim Sung-eun and Min Seo-hyun |
| 2009 | Mnet Director's Cut | Himself | Television movie |
| 2009 | Come To Play | Himself | Ep 262 - Movement Special |
| 2010 | Happy Birthday | Himself | Series regular |
| 2013 | The Return of Superman | Himself | Series Regular |
| 2014 | Show Me the Money 3 | Himself | Producer/Judge |
| 2015 | Show Me the Money 4 | Himself | Producer/Judge |
| 2024 | The Rap of China 2024 | Himself | Producer/Judge |

=== Music videos ===
| Year | Music video | Length | Album |
|---|---|---|---|
| 2011 | "Bad" (나쁘다) | 4:07 | Fever's End: Part 1 (열꽃) |
| 2011 | "Tomorrow" (feat. Taeyang) | 4:14 | Fever's End: Part 2 (열꽃) |
| 2015 | "꽃 (Flower)" | 4:43 | Flower (Xia) |
| 2023 | "Megaverse" | 4:09 | 樂-Star (Stray Kids) |

== Awards and nominations ==
Name of the award ceremony, year presented, award category, nominee(s) of the award, and the result of the nomination
| Award ceremony | Year | Category | Nominee(s)/work(s) | Result | Ref. |
|---|---|---|---|---|---|
| Korea Grand Music Awards | 2025 | Best Listener's Pick | "Stop the Rain" (with RM) | Nominated | |
| MAMA Awards | 2011 | Best Hip Hop & Rap Music | "Bad" (feat. Jinsil) | Nominated | |
| MAMA Awards | 2025 | Best Hip Hop & Rap Music | "Stop the Rain" (with RM) | Nominated | |
| MAMA Awards | 2025 | Song of the Year | "Stop the Rain" (with RM) | Longlisted | |
| SEC Awards | 2026 | International Feat of the Year | "Stop the Rain" (with RM) | Nominated | |
