= Jin Bora =

South Korean musician (born 1987)

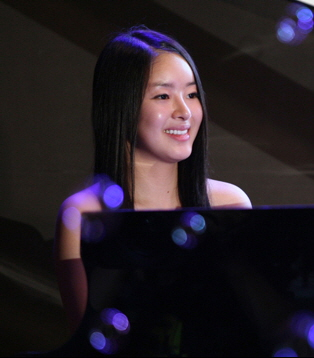
- Jin in November 2010

Background information
- Born: November 14, 1987 (age 38); Incheon, South Korea
- Origin: South Korea
- Occupations: Musician; composer; music arranger
- Instrument: Piano

- Jin Bora
- Hangul: 진보라
- Hanja: 陳珤羅
- RR: Jin Bora
- MR: Chin Pora

Jin Bora (Korean: 진보라; born November 14, 1987) is a South Korean jazz pianist, composer, music arranger, and CF model.

== Biography ==
Jin is a professional musician. She considers herself first and foremost a pianist. She began playing the piano from age 3, when she was acknowledged to have absolute pitch. Her career is young but has already made an impact.

== Education ==
Jin left school in her second year of middle school and began home schooling. She studied at the Berklee College of Music as a scholarship student.

== Career ==
Jin took top prize in jazz at the 2001 Seoul Artspool Conservatory Concours and performed in small and large concerts as well as cultural events. Such events have included the KEPCO Artspool Center, Seoul Grand Park, Samsung Open Tide, Chularm Festival of Taebak City, Chuncheon International Mime Centre (Into the Jazz & Rock Festival), Kwangju International Film Festival, Sungkyunkwan University, Busan Cultural Center, Asiana International Short Film Festival, Seoul Arts Center, Sejung Culture Center for the French Embassy, O-San Culture Center, Incheon Culture Center, and Guchang Culture Center. She has appeared on most KBS programs.

== Filmography ==
- 2014: Secret Affair as Jung Yoo-ra
