= Baek Ji-young discography =

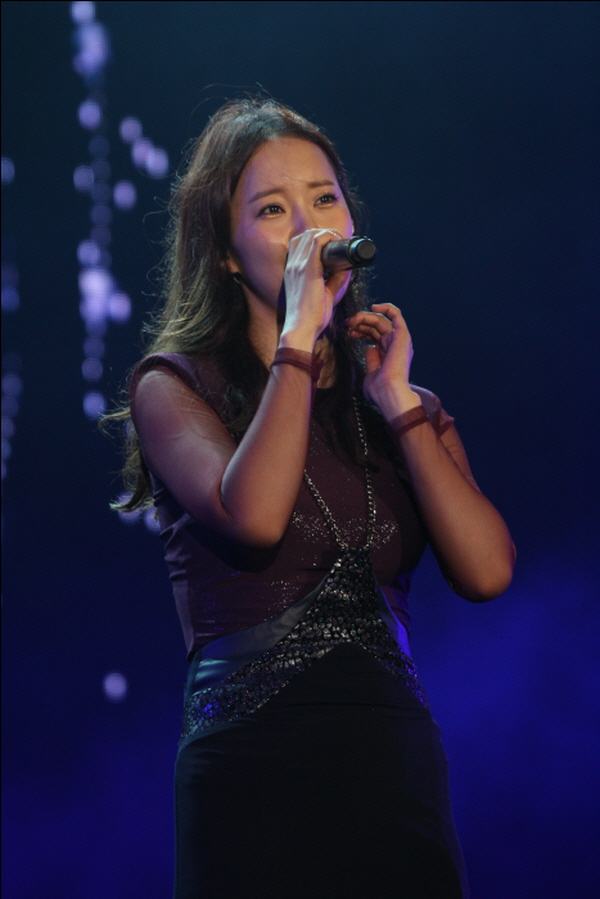
- Baek performing at the Expo Pop Festival in 2012.
- Studio albums: 8
- Extended plays: 2
- Soundtrack albums: 14
- Compilation albums: 6
- Singles: 34
- Video albums: 2

Baek Ji-young is a South Korean K-pop singer. Her discography consists of eight studio albums, six compilation albums, two video albums, two extended plays, thirty-four singles (including two as a featured artist), and fifteen soundtrack appearances.

== Albums ==
=== Studio albums ===
Title	Album details	Peak chart positions		Sales
Title	Album details	KOR RIAK	KOR Gaon	Sales
Sorrow	Released: July 10, 1999; Label: Palette Music; Format: CD, cassette, digital download	—	—	
Rouge	Released: April 18, 2000; Label: Palette Music; Format: CD, cassette, digital download	5	—	KOR: 360,201
Tres	Released: June 13, 2001; Label: Palette Music; Format: CD, cassette, digital download	5	—	KOR: 194,337
Smile	Released: September 4, 2003; Label: Sang Mind; Format: CD, cassette, digital download	5	—	KOR: 64,942
Smile Again	Released: March 21, 2006; Re-released: August 18, 2006 (Thank You I Can Smile Again); Label: Warner Music Korea; Format: CD, LP, cassette, digital download; Track listing: 1. No Love, No More; 2. EZ Do Dance; 3. Sad Luck; 4. Woo Ah!; 5. Festival; 6. Can't Get You Away; 7. To Let You Go; 8. Don't Go; 9. Nails In Your Memory; 10. Hate You; 11. I Love You; 12. Shadowed Road; 13. Ironic	10	33	KOR: 72,210
The Sixth Miracle	Released: September 7, 2007; Label: WS Entertainment, Warner Music Korea; Format: CD, cassette, digital download; Track listing: 1. Intro; 2. All I Need Is Your Love; 3. The Reason I Have Lots Of Tears; 4. You Never Even Call Me; 5. Like An Old Habits; 6. Oversleep; 7. One Girl; 8. I Love Even Your Sadness; 9. Interlude; 10. Love It; 11. Carefully Closely; 12. For Our Breakup; 13. When I Can Feel The Feeling; 14. Round and Round	—	58	
Sensibility	Released: November 13, 2008; Label: WS Entertainment; Format: CD, LP, cassette, digital download	—N/a	23	
Pitta	Released: May 23, 2011; Label: WS Entertainment; Format: CD, digital download	—N/a	5	KOR: 8,452
"—" denotes release did not chart. Note: The Gaon Music Chart was established in 2010.

=== Compilation albums ===
Title	Album details	Peak chart positions		Sales
Title	Album details	KOR RIAK	KOR Gaon	Sales
Special 1+2	Released: November 15, 2000; Label: Palette Music Entertainment; Format: CD, digital download	—	—	
Best & Live New Release	Released: January 30, 2002; Label: Universal Music Korea; Format: CD, digital download	—	—	
Ultimate Edition	Released: October 2, 2003; Label: Palette Company; Format: CD, digital download	—	—	
Timeless: The Best	Released: June 29, 2010; Label: WS Entertainment; Format: CD, digital download	—N/a	4	
OST Best (Flash Back)	Released: March 26, 2013; Label: WS Entertainment; Format: CD, digital download	—N/a	7	KOR: 17,528
OST Best Limited Package	Released: August 25, 2014; Label: The Music Works; Format: CD	—N/a	11	KOR: 2,516
"—" denotes release did not chart. Note: The Gaon Music Chart was established in 2010.

== Extended plays ==
Title	Album details	Peak chart positions	Sales
Title	Album details	KOR	Sales
Ego	Released: August 13, 2009; Label: WS Entertainment; Format: CD	—	
Good Boy	Released: May 17, 2012; Label: WS Entertainment; Format: CD, digital download	8	KOR: 4,159
Reminisce	Released: October 4, 2019; Label: TRI-US Entertainment; Format: CD, digital download	56	
"—" denotes release did not chart. Note: The Gaon Music Chart was established in 2010.

== Singles ==
=== As lead artist ===
Title	Year	Peak chart position			Sales	Album
Title	Year	KOR	KOR Hot	JPN	Sales	Album
Korean
"Choice"	1999	—	—	—		Sorrow
"Burden"	1999	—	—	—		Sorrow
"Dash"	2000	—	—	—		Rouge
"Sad Salsa"	2000	—	—	—		Rouge
"Fall"	2001	—	—	—		Tres
"Emotion"	2001	—	—	—		Tres
"Smile"	2003	—	—	—		Smile
"I Won't Love"	2006	—	—	—		Smile Again
"Ez Do Dance"	2006	—	—	—		Smile Again
"Love Is Beautiful"	2006	—	—	—		Non-album single
"Tomorrow"	2006	—	—	—		Thank You I Can Smile Again
"Crush" (with Jade)	2007	—	—	—		Non-album single
"All I Need Is Your Love" (사랑 하나면돼)	2007	—	—	—		The Sixth Miracle
"The Reason I Have Lots of Tears" (눈물이 많은 이유)	2007	—	—	—		The Sixth Miracle
"Love Is Lalala" (with Yuri)	2008	—	—	—		Non-album singles
"Gypsy's Tears"	2008	—	—	—		Non-album singles
"Like Being Shot by a Bullet"	2008	—	—	—		Sensibility
"Giving My Lips to You"	2009	—	—	—		Sensibility
"My Ear's Candy" (내귀에 캔디) (featuring Taecyeon)	2009	—	—	—		Ego
"Will Love Come?" (with Mighty Mouth)	2010	4	—	—	KOR: 1,707,900	Non-album single
"Over Time" (시간이 지나면)	2010	4	—	—	KOR: 1,569,390	Timeless: The Best
"Ordinariness" (보통)	2011	4	—	—	KOR: 1,809,146	Pitta
"Magic" (with Kangta, Gil, and Shin Seung-hun)	2012	79	—	—	KOR: 79,579	Non-album single
"Good Boy" (굿보이) (featuring Yong Jun-hyung)	2012	3	4	—	KOR: 1,581,428	Good Boy
"Hate" (싫다)	2013	3	2	—	KOR: 1,048,599	Non-album single
"Acacia" (아카시아)	2013	10	9	—	KOR: 315,606	OST Best (Flash Back)
"Reminded of You" (떠올라)	2013	17	12	—	KOR: 256,848	Non-album single
"That Kind of Woman" (그런 여자)	2013	26	16	—	KOR: 163,319	Strawberry X-Treme Festival Part 5 (single)
"Fervor" (불꽃)	2014	3	3	—	KOR: 422,190	Non-album singles
"Still in Love" (여전히 뜨겁게)	2014	5	9	—	KOR: 318,073	Non-album singles
"Whenever It Rains" (니가 내리는 날) (with Na Won-ju)	2014	55	—	—	KOR: 34,809	Non-album singles
"Garosugil at Dawn" (새벽 가로수길) (with Song Yuvin)	2015	9	—	—	KOR: 677,904	Non-album singles
"Medicine" (약도 없대요) (featuring Verbal Jint)	2016	11	—	—	KOR: 231,799	Non-album singles
"Can You Feel Me" (사랑이 온다) (with Cheetah)	2016	7	—	—	KOR: 236,777	Non-album singles
"Your Mind" (그대의 마음)	2016	63	—	—	KOR: 20,087	Non-album singles
"We" (우리가)	2019	91	—	—		Reminisce
"No Love, No Heartbreak" (다시는 사랑하지 않고, 이별에 아파하기 싫어)	2019	4	—	—		Non-album singles
"Didn't Say Anything" (아무런 말들도) (with Ong Seung-wu)	2020	81	—	—		Non-album singles
"I Still Love You a Lot" (거짓말이라도 해서 널 보고싶어)	2020	32	—	—		Non-album singles
"We Are Done" (다시 사랑한다고 해도)	2021	146	—	—		Non-album singles
"Love Made Me a Fool" (사랑 앞에서 난 바보가 돼)	2022	129	—	—		Non-album singles
"That Woman Is Me" (그 여자가 나야) (with Kim Sook)	2022	—	—	—		Non-album singles
"Time to Move On" (눈을 감고 귀를 막아도) (with GB9)	2023	189	—	—		Non-album singles
Japanese
"Sono Onna" (その女)	2013	—	—	84		Non-album singles
"Kono Ai, Wasurenaide" (この愛、忘れないで)	2013	—	—	109		Non-album singles
"—" denotes release did not chart. Note: The Gaon Music Chart was established in 2010.

=== As featured artist ===
Title	Year	Peak chart position		Sales	Album
Title	Year	KOR	KOR Hot	Sales	Album
"Because I'm Afraid" (겁이나서) (Na Yoon-kwon feat. Baek Ji-young)	2012	6	7	KOR: 1,444,015	Non-album single
"Should I Laugh or Cry?" (Electroboyz feat. Baek Ji-young)	2012	21	13	KOR: 420,466	Electrify (single)
"—" denotes release did not chart. Note: The Gaon Music Chart was established in 2010.

== Other charted songs ==
Title	Year	Peak chart position		Sales	Album
Title	Year	KOR	KOR Hot	Sales	Album
"Lost Star"	2011	132	—		Pitta
"Why Do You Close Your Eyes?"	2011	89	—		Pitta
"Bad Girl"	2011	93	—		Pitta
"I Can Drink"	2011	113	—		Pitta
"As Nothing Had Happened at All"	2011	33	—		Pitta
"No Fear"	2011	96	—		Pitta
"As Time Goes By"	2011	122	—		Pitta
"Hard to Do"	2011	97	—		Pitta
"Reminiscence" (회상) (Leessang featuring Baek Ji-young)	2011	4	5	KOR: 1,945,275	Asura Balbalta
"Voice" (featuring Gary)	2012	1	2	KOR: 2,189,415	Good Boy
"Today More Than Yesterday"	2012	73	34		Good Boy
"Voice" (Only Song)	2012	—	43		Good Boy
"—" denotes release did not chart.

== Soundtrack appearances ==
Title	Year	Peak chart position	Sales	Album
Title	Year	KOR	Sales	Album
"It's a Dream" (꿈일까봐)	2006	—		I'm Going Too OST
"Bad Person" (나쁜 사람)	2007	—		Hwang Jini OST
"Love is Not a Crime" (사랑이 죄인가요)	2009	—		Ja Myung Go OST
"Don't Forget" (잊지말아요)	2009	23		Iris OST
"Same Heart" (같은 마음)	2010	28		Road No. 1 OST
"That Woman" (그 여자)	2010	2	KOR: 2,774,186	Secret Garden OST
"That man"(그남자)	2010	69		Secret Garden special OST
"I Can't Drink" (아이캔드링크)	2011	13	KOR: 1,046,337	The Greatest Love OST
"I'm Loving You" (오늘도 사랑해)	2011	9	KOR: 1,954,583	The Princess' Man OST
"It Hurts Here" (여기가 아파)	2011	9	KOR: 1,291,317	A Thousand Days' Promise OST
"After a Long Time" (한참 지나서)	2012	15	KOR: 1,289,355	Rooftop Prince OST
"Love and Love" (사랑아또 사랑)	2012	10	KOR: 592,952	Arang and the Magistrate OST
"Spring Rain" (봄비)	2013	7	KOR: 545,355	Gu Family Book OST
"Is Crying" (울고만있어)	2013	3	KOR: 560,624	Good Doctor OST
"Wind Blows" (바람아 불어라)	2014	44	KOR: 62,435	The Royal Tailor OST
"Because of You" (너 때문에)	2015	5	KOR: 353,201	Hyde Jekyll, Me OST
"And... And" (And... 그리고)	2015	39	KOR: 84,787	The Producers OST
"Stand By Me"	2016	97		Heaven mobile game OST
"Goodbye" (그렇게 안녕)	2016	73		Goodbye Mr. Black OST
"Love is Over"	2016	16	KOR: 182,953	Love in the Moonlight OST
"See You Again" (feat. Richard Yongjae O'Neill)	2018	41		Mr. Sunshine OST
"The Days We Loved" (사랑했던 날들)	2020	127		The World of the Married OST
"If I"	2021	—		The King's Affection OST
"Waiting Fou You" (오지 않는 사람아)	2022	—		Curtain Call OST
"—" denotes release did not chart. Note: The Gaon Music Chart was established in 2010.

== Videography ==
=== Video albums ===
Title	Album details
Korean
Live Concert & Music Video Ultimate Edition	Released: May 21, 2001; Label: Yedang; Format: CD+DVD
Japanese
Baek Ji-young Premium Night Japan Debut "Secret Garden" ～Sono Onna～ Hatsubai Kinen Concert	Released: September 25, 2013; Label: Imperial Records; Format: DVD

=== Music videos ===
Title	Year
"Choice" (선택)	1999
"Burden" (부담)	1999
"Dash" (대쉬)	2000
"Sad Salsa" (새드 살사)	2000
"Fall" (추 락)	2001
"Emotion" (이모션)	2001
"Smile" (미소)	2003
"I Won't Love" (사랑안 해)	2006
"Ez Do Dance" (이지 두 댄스)	2006
"Love Is Beautiful" (사랑은 아름답습니다)	2006
"Bad Person" (나쁜사람)	2006
"Crush" (with Jade)	2007
"All I Need Is Your Love" (사랑 하나면 돼)	2007
"The Reason I Have Lots of Tears" (눈물이 많은 이유)	2007
"Love Is Lalala"	2008
"Gypsy's Tears"	2008
"Like Being Shot by a Bullet" (총맞은것처럼)	2008
"Love Is Not a Crime" (사랑이 죄인자요)	2009
"My Ear's Candy" (내귀에 캔디)	2009
"Don't Forget" (잊지말아요)	2009
"Will Love Come?" (사랑이 울까요) (with Mighty Mouth)	2010
"Over Time" (시간이 지나면)	2010
"Same Heart" (그 여자)	2010
"That Woman" (그 여사)	2010
"Ordinariness" (보통)	2011
"I Love You Too" (오늘도 사랑해)	2011
"Good Boy" (굿보이) (featuring Yong Jun-hyung)	2012
"Love and Love" (사랑아또 사랑아)	2012
"Hate" (싫다)	2013
"Acacia" (아카시아)	2013
"Spring Rain" (봄비)	2013
"Is Crying" (울고만있어)	2013
"Fervor" (불꽃)	2014
"Still in Love" (여전히 뜨겁게)	2014
"Whenever It Rains" (니가 내리는 날) (with Na Won-ju)	2014
"Wind Blows" (바람아 불어라)	2014
"Garosugil at Dawn" (새벽 가로수길) (with Song Yubin)	2015
