= Minzy Work 01: "Uno" =

Minzy Work 01: Uno

EP by Minzy
- Released: April 17, 2017
- Recorded: 2016–17
- Genres: K-pop; R&B; dance
- Length: 20:38
- Languages: Korean; English
- Labels: Music Works; Genie Music
- Producers: Superdog; Michel 'Lindgren' Schulz; Jon Asher; Stereotypes; Groovy Room

Singles from Minzy Work 01: Uno
- 1. "Ninano (니나노)" Released: April 17, 2017

Minzy Work 01: Uno is the debut extended play by South Korean singer Minzy. It was released on April 17, 2017, by The Music Works and distributed by Genie Music. It contains six tracks, including the single and title song "Ninano" duet with South Korean rapper Flowsik. The EP marks Minzy debut as a solo artist, and incorporates a range of genres, including ballad and R&B.

== Background and release ==
In mid-2016, Minzy contracted with music label Music Work and departed from girl-group 2NE1 from YG Entertainment. Soon they confirmed that Minzy was working towards her debut mini album. In mid-March, Music Work announced that Minzy's debut would be in April. On April 4, 2017, Music Work released a graphic schedule for the mini-album.

The track "Ni Na No (니나노)" features the Korean rapper Flowsik. Minzy participated with writing the lyrics for all the songs, plus co-composed the song "Beautiful Lie."

The album was released digitally on April 17, 2017, along with a music video for the title track. In South Korea, the album was distributed physically and digitally by Music Work.

== Promotion ==
Minzy held a showcase on April 17, 2017, to present her debut mini album.

Minzy began promotions of title track "Ni Na No" on music shows on April 18. She first performed the song on SBS MTV's The Show, followed by performances on SBS's Inkigayo, MBC's Show Champion, Show! Music Core, KBS' Music Bank and Mnet's M! Countdown.

== Singles ==
On April 17, 2017, Minzy released "Ni Na No", the first official single from the album. A teaser video for the song was released on April 14, followed by its music video and digital release on April 17. Minzy performed the song for the first time at the SBS MTV's The Show.

== Commercial performance ==
Minzy Work 01: Uno entered and peaked at number 10 on the Gaon Album Chart on the chart issue dated April 16–22, 2017.

The mini-album (EP) entered and peaked at number 2 on Billboard's World Albums, for the week ending May 6, 2017, as the highest ranking debut. In its second week, the EP fell to number 9.

== Track listing ==
No.	Title	Writer(s)	Producer(s)	Length
1.	"Ni Na No" (니나노) (featuring Flowsik)	Michel "Lindgren" Schulz, Jon Asher, Melanie Fontana, Minzy, Flowsik	Superdog, Michel 'Lindgren' Schulz, Jon Asher	03:11
2.	"Superwoman" (수퍼우먼)	Joshua Wilkinson, Jack McManus, Michel 'Lindgren' Schulz, Melanie Fontana, Minzy	Superdog, Michel 'Lindgren' Schulz	03:28
3.	"ING" (알쏭달쏭)	Stereotypes, Kat Nestle, Minzy	Superdog, Stereotypes	03:18
4.	"Flashlight" (featuring Jay Park)	Groovy Room (그루비룸), Minzy, Jay Park	Superdog, GroovyRoom (그루비룸)	03:15
5.	"Beautiful Lie"	Minzy, Superdog (슈퍼도그), Brian Cho	Superdog	04:15
6.	"Ni Na No" (English rap ver.) (featuring Flowsik)	Michel 'Lindgren' Schulz, Jon Asher, Melanie Fontana, Minzy, Flowsik	Superdog, Michel 'Lindgren' Schulz, Jon Asher	03:11
Total length:				20:38

== Charts ==
Chart (2017)	Peak position
New Zealand Heatseekers Albums (RMNZ)	10
South Korea (Gaon)	10
US World Albums (Billboard)	2

== Release history ==
Country	Date	Format	Label
South Korea	April 17, 2017	CD, digital download,	The Music Works, Genie Music
Worldwide	April 17, 2017	Digital download	The Music Works, Genie Music
