= Patrick Joseph =

Patrick Joseph may refer to:

- Patrick Joseph (musician)
- Patrick Joseph (footballer)
- Patrick Joseph (runner), winner of the 2018 distance medley relay at the NCAA Division I Indoor Track and Field Championships
