= Life on Mars (South Korean TV series) =

2018 South Korean television series

- Promotional poster
- Hangul: 라이프 온 마스
- RR: Raipeu on maseu
- MR: Raip'ŭ on masŭ
- Genre: Police procedural; Crime drama; Time travel
- Based on: Life on Mars by: Matthew Graham; Tony Jordan; Ashley Pharoah
- Developed by: Studio Dragon
- Directed by: Lee Jung-hyo
- Starring: Jung Kyung-ho; Park Sung-woong; Go Ah-sung; Oh Dae-hwan; Noh Jong-hyun
- Country of origin: South Korea
- Original language: Korean
- No. of episodes: 16

Production
- Executive producer: Kim Gun hong
- Producers: Jeong Se-ryeong; Hwang Chang Woo; Cho Hye Rin
- Running time: 60 minutes
- Production company: Production H

Original release
- Network: OCN
- Release: June 9 – August 5, 2018

Related
- Life on Mars (British TV series); Life on Mars (American TV series)

Life on Mars (Korean: 라이프 온 마스) is a South Korean television series based on the 2006–07 British series of the same name. It stars Jung Kyung-ho, Park Sung-woong, Go Ah-sung, Oh Dae-hwan and Noh Jong-hyun. The series aired on OCN from June 9 to August 5, 2018 on Saturdays and Sundays at 22:20 (KST).

== Synopsis ==
Han Tae-joo (Jung Kyung-Ho) leads a crime investigation team. He has experienced a rapid rise in his career and he trusts data over people. While investigating a serial murder case, he has an accident. When Han Tae-joo wakes up, he finds himself in 1988. He does not know why, but he is now a detective appointed to work at a police station in a small city. To get back to the present day, Han Tae-joo tries to solve a serial murder case.

== Cast ==
=== Main ===
- Jung Kyung-ho as Han Tae-joo: A modern-day forensics scientist who travels back to the past and becomes a detective. He is a brilliant, principled individual who prefers to rely on scientific data and evidence rather than people (Note: Tae-joo is an adaptation of Sam Tyler played by John Simm in the original series.)
- Park Sung-woong as Kang Dong-chul: Head of the Homicide Team. A detective who is uninterested in evidence and instead uses his keen instincts and intuition to solve his cases. (Note: Dong-chul is an adaptation of Gene Hunt played by Philip Glenister in the original series and subsequent sequel series Ashes to Ashes.)
- Go Ah-sung as Yoon Na-young: The only female member of the team. She is a passionate ace investigator who dreams of becoming a star detective. (Note: Na-young is an adaptation of Annie Cartwright played by Liz White in the original series.)
- Oh Dae-hwan as Lee Yong-gi: A police sergeant in the homicide unit. He is described as unhinged and with a nasty temper. (Note: Yong-gi is an adaptation of Ray Carling played by Dean Andrews in the original series and subsequent sequel series Ashes to Ashes.)
- Noh Jong-hyun as Jo Nam-sik: The youngest detective on the team. (Note: Nam-sik is an adaptation of Chris Skelton played by Marshall Lancaster in the original series and subsequent sequel series Ashes to Ashes.)

=== Recurring ===
- Jeon Seok-ho as Han Choong-Ho: father of Han Tae-Joo
- Kim Jae-kyung as Han Mal-sook
- Kim Dae-gon as Park Byung-doo
- Lee Bong-ryun as Yoo Soon-hee
- Kim Young-pil as Kim Myung-se: An elite head detective who cares more about his appearance than investigations.
- Lee Ji-ha as Han Mal-sook
- Yoo Yeon as Lee Sun-ja
- Lee Hee-won as Han Tae-joo
- Kim Ki-cheon as Manager Park
- Oh Ah-rin as Young-joo
- Choi Seung-yoon as Kim Min Seok (2018)
  - Oh Han-kyul as child Kim (1988)

=== Special appearance ===
- Park Gyu-young as Daughter
- Moon Woo-jin as Kyung Ho (Ep. 6)
- Joo Suk-tae as Lee Kang Heon, 1988 - escaped prisoner & hostage-taker (Ep. 7)
- Hong Kyung as "E.T." / Oh Young Soo [1988] (Ep. 10,12)
- Moon Sook as Kim Mi-yeon - Tae Joo's mother [2018] (Ep. 15-16)
- Jeon Hye-bin as Jung Seo-hyun, Tae-joo's fiancée and prosecutor

== Production ==
- First script reading took place on March 12, 2018 at Studio Dragon in Sangam-dong.
- Im Chang-jung was offered a major supporting role but he declined the offer.
- Seo Ji-hoon was cast in the role of Jo Nam-sik but dropped out of the project.

== Original soundtrack ==
Life on Mars OST

Soundtrack album by Various artists
- Released: 2018
- Genre: Soundtrack
- Languages: Korean; English
- Labels: Stone Music Entertainment; withHC

=== Part 1 ===
Released on July 1, 2018
No.	Title	Lyrics	Music	Artist	Length
1.	"AGNES"	Nam Hye-seung; Jello Ann	Nam Hye-seung; Kim Hee-jin	Patrick Joseph	03:49
2.	"AGNES" (Inst.)		Nam Hye-seung; Kim Hee-jin		03:49
Total length:					7:38

=== Part 2 ===
Released on July 14, 2018
No.	Title	Lyrics	Music	Artist	Length
1.	"Wherever You Are" (너는 어디쯤)	Shin Hae-kyung	Shin Hae-kyung	Shin Hae-kyung	04:21
2.	"Wherever You Are" (Inst.)		Shin Hae-kyung		04:21
Total length:					08:42

=== Part 3 ===
Released on July 14, 2018
No.	Title	Lyrics	Music	Artist	Length
1.	"Always Within Me"	Josef Melin, Park Geun-chul	RUNY, Kwon Deok-geun, IVeR	RUNY	03:25
2.	"Always Within Me" (Inst.)		RUNY, Kwon Deok-geun, IVeR		03:25
Total length:					06:50

== Ratings ==
Life on Mars : South Korea viewers per episode (millions)

Season	Episode number																Average
Season	1	2	3	4	5	6	7	8	9	10	11	12	13	14	15	16	Average
1	0.584	0.907	1.017	1.214	0.877	1.080	1.126	1.298	1.180	1.183	1.092	1.425	1.136	1.295	1.334	1.730	1.155

Source: Audience measurement performed nationwide by Nielsen Media Research.

Average TV viewership ratings
Ep.	Original broadcast date	Average audience share		
Ep.	Original broadcast date	AGB Nielsen		TNmS
Ep.	Original broadcast date	Nationwide	Seoul	Nationwide
1	June 9, 2018	2.081%	1.911%	2.2%
2	June 10, 2018	3.122%	3.303%	—N/a
3	June 16, 2018	3.268%	3.432%	—N/a
4	June 17, 2018	3.762%	3.968%	—N/a
5	June 23, 2018	3.098%	3.001%	3.5%
6	June 24, 2018	3.969%	3.983%	4.9%
7	June 30, 2018	3.817%	3.794%	—N/a
8	July 1, 2018	4.681%	4.933%	5.1%
9	July 14, 2018	3.980%	4.525%	4.2%
10	July 15, 2018	4.170%	4.590%	5.2%
11	July 21, 2018	3.893%	4.353%	4.9%
12	July 22, 2018	4.834%	5.544%	5.7%
13	July 28, 2018	3.933%	4.388%	—N/a
14	July 29, 2018	4.695%	5.036%	—N/a
15	August 4, 2018	4.657%	4.787%	4.7%
16	August 5, 2018	5.851%	6.377%	6.0%
Average		3.988%	4.245%	4.6%
In the table above, the blue numbers represent the lowest ratings and the red numbers represent the highest ratings.; N/A denotes that the rating is not known.; This drama aired on a cable channel/pay TV which normally has a relatively smaller audience compared to free-to-air TV/public broadcasters (KBS, SBS, MBC and EBS).; Episodes 9 and 10 did not air on July 7 and 8, 2018 as originally planned. To allow more time for filming, they were postponed by a week.

== Awards and nominations ==
Year	Award	Category	Recipient	Result	Ref.
2018	6th APAN Star Awards	Top Excellence Award, Actor in a Miniseries	Jung Kyung-ho	Nominated	
2018	6th APAN Star Awards	Excellence Award, Actress in a Miniseries	Go Ah-sung	Won	
2018	2nd The Seoul Awards	Best Supporting Actress	Go Ah-sung	Nominated	
2018	Asian Academy Creative Awards	Best Adaptation of an Existing Format	Life on Mars	Won	
