= Song Yuvin =

South Korean singer (born 1998)

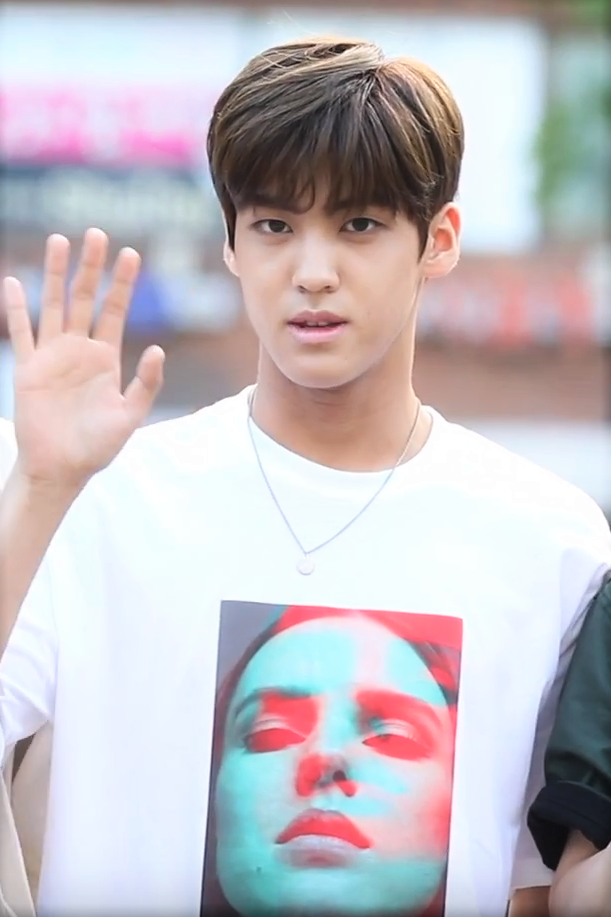
- Yuvin in July 2018
- Born: Song Yu-bin; April 28, 1998 (age 28); Daegu, South Korea
- Education: Hanlim Multi Art School
- Occupations: Singer; actor
- Musical career
- Genre: K-pop
- Instrument: Vocals
- Years active: 2014–present
- Labels: Music Works; Flex M
- Formerly of: Myteen; B.O.Y
- Website: Official website

Korean name
- Hangul: 송유빈
- RR: Song Yubin
- MR: Song Yubin

Song Yu-bin (Korean: 송유빈, born April 28, 1998), commonly referred to as Song Yuvin, is a South Korean singer and actor. He is best known as a contestant of Superstar K6 and Produce X 101, and for being one of the vocalists of the South Korean group Myteen. Following Myteen's disbandment in 2019, he debuted as a member of the duo B.O.Y, until their disbandment in April 2021.

Song made his solo debut on May 30, 2016, with his digital single "It's You To The Bone". He made his acting debut in the 2016 drama Age of Youth.

== Career ==
=== 1998–2014: Early life ===
Song Yuvin was born on April 28, 1998, in Daegu, South Korea. His family consists of his parents and an older sister. He graduated from the Broadcasting and Entertainment department of Hanlim Multi Art High School in 2017, alongside Dahyun from Twice and the actor Shin Dong-woo. Song is currently attending the Practical Music department of Dong-ah Institute of Media and Arts.

His parents and sister all like singing, which made Yuvin interested as well. When he was in elementary school, he would go to karaoke rooms a lot and started singing ballads when he entered middle school. His parents gave him the permission to attend a vocal academy, after his friends praised him for his vocals, despite originally not wanting him to become a singer. He attended the academy for three months as a hobby, before being asked various times to audition for Superstar K6.

=== 2014–2016: Superstar K6 and career beginnings ===
Song appeared on the first episode of Superstar K6, singing "Farewell Taxi" by Kim Yeon-woo. He received praises from the judges for his visuals and vocals. He quickly became a popular contestant, reaching the top 4, before being eliminated during the 12th episode of the show. Song had meetings with different music companies after Superstar K6 was over, including The Music Works, whose manager came directly to him. He signed with them in February 2015.

Song was featured on Baek Ji-young's single "Garosugil at Dawn" in March 2015. The song quickly became a hit, reaching the top ranks on various music charts. In May of the same year, he released his first OST with Kim Na-young for the drama A Girl Who Sees Smells. In April 2016, Song released an OST for the drama Goodbye Mr. Black and made his solo debut a month later with "It's You To The Bone". It was announced the same month that Song would make his idol debut as a member of the boy group Myteen in 2017.

Alongside Sam Kim and Eric Nam, Song took part in the eighth season of The Friends where they travelled to Costa Rica. The show aired during summer 2016 for 4 episodes. In July 2016, he made his acting debut with a cameo appearance in the third episode of the drama Age of Youth. He spent the rest of the year releasing other OST and collaborations, while attending Myteen's "Follow Myteen Tour" performances in different South Korean cities and in Hong Kong.

=== 2017–present: Myteen, B.O.Y, and solo career ===
In January 2017, Song appeared on Myteen's pre-debut reality show Myteen Go. The show aired for 7 episodes until late February. He released an OST for the drama Good Manager on February 18. Myteen made their debut on July 26 with their first EP "Myteen Go!". Song walked as model during the Seoul Fashion Week in October 2017. He was originally supposed to take part in the survival program Mix Nine but became a MC on the show Kiss The Beauty instead and couldn't participate in the former. In January 2018, Song attended the 14th Idol Star Athletics Championships that aired a month after. In February, Song and some of his labelmates appeared as panelists on I Can See Your Voice. He appeared on an episode of the show Mama Papa with his teammate Eunsu in April.

Myteen made their first comeback in July 2018 with their EP "F;uzzle". On July 12, Song released an OST for the drama What's Wrong with Secretary Kim. In August, he took part in the 15th Idol Star Athletics Championships with his teammate Shin Jun-seob, the show was aired in September. In October, Song became a contestant on the show King of Mask Singer, appearing on the 173rd episode. He lost during the first round against Seola of Cosmic Girls.

In February 2019, he became the male lead character in the 2-episode drama Loss Time Life along with Kwon Mina. Song also sang the OST for the drama. From March 2019 to July 2019, Song, alongside his teammate Kim Kook-heon, participated in the survival show Produce X 101. He advanced to the final round of the show where he ultimately ranked 16th. Song and Kim Kook-heon would later debut in the group B.O.Y in January 2020.

On April 30, 2021, The Music Works announced that Yuvin's contract expired and that he left the company.

On April 26, 2022, it was announced that Yuvin has signed an exclusive contract with Flex M, a subsidiary of Kakao Entertainment.

== Discography ==
=== Singles ===
==== As lead artist ====
List of singles, with selected chart positions, showing year released and album name
Title	Year	Peak chart positions	Sales	Album
Title	Year	KOR Gaon	Sales	Album
"It's You to the Bone" (뼛속까지 너야) (feat. Heota)	2016	—	—N/a	Non-album single
"Through Love" (모든 사랑은 이처럼 따뜻한가요)	2020	—	—N/a	Non-album single
"—" denotes releases that did not chart or were not released in that region. "*" indicates that the Gaon Chart was revamped at this time and digital sales were deflated.

==== As featured artist ====
Title	Year	Peak chart positions	Sales	Album
Title	Year	KOR Gaon	Sales	Album
"Garosugil At Dawn" (새벽 가로수길) (Baek Ji-young feat. Song Yuvin)	2015	9	KOR: 677,904	Non-album singles
"Give Me A Break" (Flo feat. Song Yuvin)	2015	—	—N/a	Non-album singles
"Over Tonight" (Flo feat. Song Yuvin)	2015	—	—N/a	Non-album singles
"Okay (Korean)" (The Piano Guys and Song Yuvin)	2016	—	—N/a	Uncharted (Korea Deluxe)
"Okay (English)" (The Piano Guys and Song Yuvin)	2016	—	—N/a	Uncharted (Korea Deluxe)
"—" denotes releases that did not chart or were not released in that region. "*" indicates that the Gaon Chart was revamped at this time and digital sales were deflated.

=== Soundtrack appearances ===
Title	Year	Peak chart positions	Album
Title	Year	KOR Gaon	Album
"Shouting Those Words" (외치는 그 말) (Flo featuring Song Yuvin)	2015	—	Love & Secret OST
"Ordinary Farewell" (흔한 이별) (with Kim Na-young)	2015	77	A Girl Who Sees Smells OST
"Perhaps This Is.." (아마도 이건)	2016	—	Goodbye Mr. Black OST
"Coincidence" (우연한 일들) (with Kim So-hee)	2016	—	Hey Ghost, Let's Fight OST
"The Common People"	2016	—	Be Positive OST
"Starlight Falling Night" (별빛이 쏟아지는 밤)	2017	—	Good Manager OST
"Words Being Said For The First Time" (처음 하는 말)	2018	—	What's Wrong with Secretary Kim OST
"The Last Letter" (마지막편지)	2019	—	Loss Time Life OST
"Reload" (다시)	2019	—	Pegasus Market OST
"Coco" (코코) (with Sunwoo Jung-a, Suran, Park Kyung and Kim Hyun-woo)	2019	—	Melody Book OST
"The Little Prince (Withered Flower)" (어린 왕자 (시들어버린 꽃)) (with Sunwoo Jung-a, Suran and Park Kyung)	2019	—	Melody Book OST
"Let's Meet" (만나려 해) (with Sunwoo Jung-a, Suran, Park Kyung, Kim Hyun-woo and Parc Jae-jung)	2019	—	Melody Book OST
"Goin' Crazy (feat. Ravi)" (with Sunwoo Jung-a, Suran, Park Kyung and Kim Hyun-woo)	2019	—	Melody Book OST
"Moon, Sleep, Dream... We" (달, 잠, 꿈... 우리) (with Sunwoo Jung-a, Suran, Park Kyung, Kim Hyun-woo and Kim Tae-hyun)	2019	—	Melody Book OST
"No Choice But to Believe" (믿는 수밖에) (with Sunwoo Jung-a and Park Kyung)	2019	—	Melody Book OST
"Love is Danger" (with Raina)	2020	—	Once Again OST
"Oh, It's Love" (그래 사랑이야)	2022	—	Curtain Call OST
"Everything I loved" (내가 사랑한 모든 것)	2023	—	All That We Loved OST
"—" denotes releases that did not chart or were not released in that region.

=== Compilation appearances ===
Title	Year	Album
"Why Is The Sky" (왜 하늘은)	2014	Superstar K6 Top 11 - Part.1
"I Love You" (사랑합니다)	2014	Superstar K6 Top 11 - Part.2
"Moai"	2014	Superstar K6 Top 11 - Part.3
"I Will Give You Everything" (다 줄거야)	2014	Superstar K6 Top 11 - Part.4
"Count Up to Ten" (열을 세어 보아요)	2014	Superstar K6 Top 11 - Part.5
"Because You're My Woman" (내 여자라니까)	2018	King of Mask Singer Episode 173

=== Songwriting and composing credits ===
Year	Album	Artist	Song	Lyrics		Music	
Year	Album	Artist	Song	Credited	With	Credited	With
2019	Melody Book OST	Melody Book cast	"Coco"	Yes	Sunwoo Jung-a, Suran, Park Kyung	No	—N/a
2019	Melody Book OST	Melody Book cast	"The Little Prince (Withered Flower)"	Yes	Park Kyung	No	—N/a
2019	Melody Book OST	Melody Book cast	"Goin' Crazy (feat. Ravi)"	Yes	Sunwoo Jung-a, Suran, Park Kyung, Ravi	No	—N/a
2019	Melody Book OST	Melody Book cast	"No Choice But to Believe"	Yes	Sunwoo Jung-a, Park Kyung	Yes	Sunwoo Jung-a, Park Kyung, vintermoon, WEATHER
2020	Phase One : You	B.O.Y	"Starlight"	Yes	Jo Yu-ri (Jam Factory), Kim Kook-heon	Yes	Young Chance, Kwon Deok-geun
2020	Phase Two : We	B.O.Y	"We"	No	—N/a	Yes	Kwon Deok-geun, MosPick, Young Chance

== Filmography ==
=== Television series ===
Year	Title	Role	Notes	Ref.
2016	Hello, My Twenties!	Jiwon's date	Cameo (episode 3)	
2019	Loss Time Life	Yoo-geon	Main role	

=== Television shows ===
Year	Title	Role	Notes	Ref.
2014	Superstar K 6	Contestant	Finished in Top 4	
2016	The Friends in Costa Rica	Cast member		
2017	I'm An Actor	Contestant		
2017	Kiss The Beauty	MC		
2019	Produce X 101	Contestant	Finished 16th	
2019	BanBan Show	MC		
2019	Melody Book	Cast member		

=== Web shows ===
Year	Title	Role	Ref.
2016	Daegu Boy Seoul Tour.com	Cast member	
2022	Idol Hit Song Festival	Contestant	

=== Music videos ===
Title	Year	Director	Ref.	Note
"Garosugil at Dawn" (with Baek Ji-young)	2015			
"Bang" (sung by GB9)	2015			Male lead
"It's You to the Bone" (with Heota)	2016			
"Sobok Sobok" (sung by Kim So-hee)	2017			Male lead
