= Jang Dong-joo =

South Korean actor

- Born: October 25, 1994 (age 31); South Korea
- Occupation: Actor
- Years active: 2017–present
- Agent: Management W

Korean name
- Hangul: 장동주
- RR: Jang Dongju
- MR: Chang Tongju

Jang Dong-joo (Korean: 장동주, born October 25, 1994) is a South Korean actor. He is best known for his role in the television series Loss Time Life and film Honest Candidate.

== Career ==
In May 2026, Jang announced his retirement from the entertainment industry and became a businessman instead. Subsequently, he signaled his transformation into a screenwriter and film producer.

== Filmography ==
=== Film ===
Year	Title	Role	Ref.
2018	The Unstoppable Curling Team	Pil-gu	
2020	Honest Candidate	Bong Eun-ho	
2023	Count	Hwan-ju	
2024	Handsome Guys	Lee Seong-bin	

=== Television series ===
Year	Title	Role	Ref.
2017	School 2017	Shin Jun-kyu	
2017	Criminal Minds	Park Jae-min	
2018	My Strange Hero	Lee Chae-min	
2019	Class of Lies	Kim Han-soo	
2019	Loss Time Life	Ju Dong-ha	
2021	Let Me Be Your Knight	Seo Woo-yeon	
2025	Trigger	Jang Jung-woo	
2026	No Tail to Tell	Hyun Woo-seok	
