= The Friends (TV series) =

- Genre: Travel, reality
- Country of origin: South Korea
- Original language: Korean
- No. of seasons: 8
- No. of episodes: 32

Production
- Production location: South Korea
- Camera setup: Multi-camera

Original release
- Network: K-STAR
- Release: May 28, 2014 – present

The Friends (Korean: THE 프렌즈) is a South Korean reality show. As of July 2016, the show has had 8 seasons. Nine seasons are described below, so there may have also been a ninth season.

== Seasons ==
=== Season 1: Friends in Macau ===
- Lee Ki-woo
- Hyun Woo
- Seo Ha-joon

=== Season 2: The Friends in Cebu ===
- Ha Seok-jin
- Lee Jae-yoon
- Yoo Ha-joon

=== Season 3: The Friends in Tottori ===
- Yoon Se-ah
- Shin Da-eun
- Park Ran

=== Season 4: The Friends in Taiwan ===
- Lee Jung-jin
- Kang Dong-jun
- Goh Tae-yong

=== Season 5: The Friends in Croatia ===
- Jang Hyuk
- Shin Seung-hwan
- Choi Ki-sup

=== Season 6: The Friends in Switzerland ===
- Leeteuk
- Ryeowook

=== Season 7: The Friends in Chiang Mai ===
- Joon Park
- Danny Ahn
- Ryohei Otani

=== Season 8: The Friends in Costa Rica ===
- Eric Nam
- Sam Kim
- Song Yuvin

=== Season 9: The Friends in Adriatic Sea ===
- GFriend
