= A Year-End Medley =

2021 South Korean romance film

- Theatrical release poster
- Hangul: 해피 뉴 이어
- Lit.: Happy New Year
- RR: Haepi nyu ieo
- MR: Haep'i nyu iŏ
- Directed by: Kwak Jae-yong
- Written by: Yoo Seung-hee
- Produced by: Kim Won-guk
- Starring: Han Ji-min; Lee Dong-wook; Kang Ha-neul; Im Yoon-ah; Won Jin-ah; Lee Hye-young; Jung Jin-young; Kim Young-kwang; Seo Kang-joon; Lee Kwang-soo; Ko Sung-hee; Lee Jin-wook; Cho Jun-young; Won Ji-an
- Cinematography: Yang Hyun-suk
- Edited by: Kim Hyung-joo
- Music by: Kim Jun-seong
- Production companies: Hive Media Corp. CJ Entertainment
- Distributed by: CJ Entertainment; TVING
- Release date: December 29, 2021
- Running time: 138 minutes
- Country: South Korea
- Language: Korean
- Box office: US$1.9 million

A Year-End Medley (Korean: 해피 뉴 이어; RR: Haepi nyu ieo; lit. 'Happy New Year') is a 2021 South Korean romance film directed by Kwak Jae-yong and features an ensemble cast. The film depicts the story of clients who visit the hotel 'Emross' with their own stories as they make their own relations in their own style. It was released simultaneously in theatres and via streaming media TVING on 29 December 2021.

On January 21, 2022, it was announced that due to its popularity, the film will be released as a new six-part extended version of 30 minutes each. All six episodes will be released on TV on January 26, 2022.

== Synopsis ==
Happy New Year is a feel-good romantic comedy of people who met each other at Hotel Emross during the New Year holidays. Each one has his own memory to relate and create relationship or just going nostalgic.

== Cast ==
- Han Ji-min as Park So-jin, hotel Emross manager
- Lee Dong-wook as Kim Yong-jin, CEO of hotel Emross
- Kang Ha-neul as Kang Jae-yong, a guest of hotel Emross who is staying in room 1739
- Im Yoon-ah as Mo Su-yeon, hotel staff who is also the wake up caller for Jae Yong
- Won Jin-ah as Baek Lee-young, a musical actress who works as a hotel room maid
- Lee Hye-young as Catherine, a Korean businesswoman returning to Korea to attend her daughter's wedding
- Jung Jin-young as Kang Sang-gyu, doorman at hotel Emross and Catherine's first love
- Kim Young-kwang as Seung Hyo, a radio producer
- Seo Kang-joon as Lee Kang, a singer-songwriter and radio DJ
- Lee Kwang-soo as Sang Hoon, manager of an unknown artist who becomes a hit as a singer and popular DJ
- Ko Sung-hee as Young Joo, a jazz pianist
- Lee Jin-wook as Jin Ho, a plastic surgeon waiting for his true love
- Cho Jun-young as Park Se-jik, a high school swimmer who has a secret crush on Lim Ah-yeong
- Won Ji-an as Lim Ah-yeong, a figure skater
- Baek Eun-hye as manager of the hotel Emross maid team
- Lee Joong-ok as Executive director
- Bae Hae-sun as Jung Mi-sook
- Oh Min-ae as Sang-gyu's wife
- Kim Soo-gyeom as Lee Chul-min, a high school student and close friend of Park Se-jik
- Lee Kyu-hyung as shaman
- Kwon Sang-woo

== Production ==
=== Casting ===
On April 22, 2021 CJ ENM and TVING announced that the film Happy New Year would be directed by Kwak Jae-yong and confirmed the cast as: Han Ji-min, Lee Dong-wook, Kang Ha-neul, Im Yoon-ah, Won Jin-ah, Seo Kang-jun, Lee Kwang-soo, Kim Young-kwang, Ko Sung-hee, Lee Jin-wook, Lee Kyu-hyung, Jo Jun-young, Won Ji-an and Lee Hye-young and Jung Jin-young.

=== Filming ===
Principal photography of the film began on April 19, 2021.

== Reception ==
=== Box office ===
The film was released on 832 screens on December 29, 2021. As per Korean Film Council (Kofic) integrated computer network, the film ranked third on the Korean box office with 207,379 cumulative admissions in the opening week. It ranked 3rd at the overall box office and 1st at the box office for Korean films in the opening week of its release.

As of January 16, 2022 it is at 3rd place in the list of Korean films released in the year 2022, with combined gross of US$1.81 million and 230,785 admissions for both years.

=== Critical response ===
Jo Yeon-kyung reviewing for JTBC rated it with 2.5 out of 5 on popcorn index and stated that running time of the film was short as it had many stories. She appreciated the performances of ensemble and especially praised Kang Ha-neul and Lee Kwang-soo saying, "[they] showed off their outstanding abilities". Concluding review Jo opined that the it was not a superhero film and genre was not refreshing, still "the pleasant warmth is not pushed away." And Jo ended it writing, "In the cinematic ending of finding each person's relationship, the original growth that makes me fall in love is also a healing message conveyed by Happy New Year." Park Jae-hwan of KBS Entertainment wrote, "It is a spectacle love story in which the 14 main characters unfold at least 7 romances." Concluding Park stated, "This movie is a kind of film that asks you to spend the new year warmly with your family or with someone who will become your family. It is happy to see it in the theater and happy to see it on TV. Anyway, "Happy New Year~"".
