= Loss Time Life =

2019 South Korean television series

- Promotional poster
- Also known as: Loss Time Life: The Last Chance
- Hangul: 로스타임 라이프
- RR: Roseutaim raipeu
- MR: Rosŭt'aim raip'ŭ
- Genre: Melodrama; Fantasy
- Written by: Lee In-hye
- Directed by: Lim Eun
- Starring: Song Yuvin; Kwon Mina
- Country of origin: South Korea
- Original language: Korean
- No. of episodes: 2

Production
- Executive producers: Hwang Bu-gun; Lee Sun-woo
- Camera setup: Single-camera
- Running time: 60 minutes
- Production companies: Home Choice; Story Plan

Original release
- Network: MBN; UMAX
- Release: February 13 – February 14, 2019

Loss Time Life (Korean: 로스타임 라이프) is a 2019 South Korean television series starring Song Yuvin and Kwon Mina. It is a remake of the 2008 Japanese drama of the same name which aired on Fuji TV with Juri Ueno and Ryō Tamura as lead actors. The series aired on February 13 and 14, 2019, at 23:00 (KST) of MBN and UMAX.

== Synopsis ==
So-jin was Yoo-geon's childhood friend and first love. They meet again as she becomes one of his teachers in high school. After he suddenly dies, Yoo-geon is given a second chance in the form of thirty hours during which he finds the meaning of love.

== Cast ==
=== Main ===
- Song Yuvin as Kim Yoo-geon

A high school student who is a member of the judo team.

- Kwon Mina as So-jin

A hardworking teacher who has no interest in dating.

=== Supporting ===
- Kim Jin-woo as Gu Jin-seong

A physical education teacher at Yoo-geon's school.

- Jang Dong-joo as Ju Dong-ha

A member of the judo team and Yoo-geon's rival.

- Oh Jung-yeon as Gae Seu-teo
- Kim Won-hyo as Hae Sol-ja
- Park Sun-jae
- Choi Min
- Lee Kyu-sung as Min-hyung
- Kim Jae-won
- Lee Sang-eun
- Hong Hyun-ho
- Um Hyo-sup as Head Referee

== Production ==
The series was entirely pre-produced.

== Original soundtrack ==
Loss Time Life OST

Soundtrack album
- Released: 2019
- Language: Korean
- Labels: Genie Music; Doctor Avenue

Released on February 13, 2019
| No. | Title | Lyrics | Music | Artist | Length |
|---|---|---|---|---|---|
| 1. | "The Last Letter" (마지막편지) | Jaehyeon | Park Ae-ri | Song Yuvin (MYTEEN) | 3:26 |

== Ratings ==
In this table, the blue numbers represent the lowest ratings and the red numbers represent the highest ratings.

| Ep. | Original broadcast date | Average audience share (AGB Nielsen) |
|---|---|---|
| 1 | February 13, 2019 | 0.9% |
| 2 | February 14, 2019 | 0.6% |

- This drama airs on a cable channel/pay TV which normally has a relatively smaller audience compared to free-to-air TV/public broadcasters (KBS, SBS, MBC and EBS).
