= Heesu in Class 2 =

2025 South Korean television series

- Promotional poster
- Hangul: 희수 2반
- RR: Huisu 2ban
- MR: Hŭisu 2pan
- Genre: Romantic drama; BL
- Based on: Heesu in Class 2 by Lily Suzu
- Directed by: Park Kyung-min
- Country of origin: South Korea
- Original language: Korean
- No. of episodes: 10

Production
- Running time: 45 minutes
- Production companies: Changin' Pictures; Film K

Original release
- Network: Heavenly
- Release: March 28 – April 26, 2025

Heesu in Class 2 (Korean: 희수 2반) is a South Korean romantic BL television series directed by Park Kyung-min. It is based on the webtoon of the same name written and illustrated by Lily Suzu, published by Lezhin Comics.

The series aired on Heavenly from March 28, to April 26, 2025, with international distribution through Viki.

== Synopsis ==
Lee Hee-su is a student who lives in the shadow of his best friend, Ju Chan-yeong, for whom he secretly harbors feelings. Known only as "Chan Yeong's friend", his life changes when a rumor spreads through the school: anyone with a love problem should seek advice from Hee-su in Class 2. Suddenly, he becomes the center of attention, even though he struggles to handle his own emotions.

== Cast ==
=== Main ===
- Ahn Ji-ho as Lee Hee-su
- Lee Sang-jun as Kim Seung-won
- Cho Jun-young as Ju Chan-yeong
- Kim Do-yeon as Choi Ji-yu

=== Supporting ===
- Jeon Yeong-in as Sin Ho-sik
- Kim Han-na as Lee Hee-jeong
- Park Kyung-hye as Lee Hee-jae
- Jung Ye-nok as Lee Hee-sin
- Yeon Si-woo as Cha So-hee

== Release ==
The series was released on Heavenly between March 28 and April 26, 2025, with episodes broadcast on Fridays and Saturdays. Each episode runs for approximately 45 minutes. Internationally, the series was made available on Viki.

== Reception ==
South Korean media covered the adaptation extensively. iMBC highlighted the premiere and cast, while News1 reported on its positive reception among younger viewers. The Chosun Ilbo published an article on the finale and its impact, and Sports Khan analyzed the adaptation compared to the original webtoon.

Internationally, Anime News Network reported on the premiere as one of the major BL adaptations of 2025, while Abstractaf published a review focusing on the teenage themes.
