= Live On (TV series) =

2020 South Korean television series

- Promotional poster
- Hangul: 라이브온
- RR: Raibeuon
- MR: Raibŭon
- Genre: Coming-of-age; Drama; Teen
- Written by: Bang Yoo-jung
- Directed by: Kim Sang-woo
- Starring: Jung Da-bin; Hwang Min-hyun; Noh Jong-hyun; Yang Hye-ji; Yeonwoo; Choi Byung-chan
- Country of origin: South Korea
- Original language: Korean
- No. of episodes: 8

Production
- Executive producers: Ham Young-hoon; Park Woo-ram
- Producers: Park Tae-won; Park Seong-hye
- Running time: 60 minutes
- Production companies: JTBC Studios; KeyEast; PlayList

Original release
- Network: JTBC
- Release: November 17, 2020 – January 12, 2021

Live On (Korean: 라이브온) is a South Korean television series starring Jung Da-bin, Hwang Min-hyun, Noh Jong-hyun, Yang Hye-ji, Yeonwoo and Choi Byung-chan. Written by Bang Yoo-jung and directed by Kim Sang-woo, the series centers on a high school girl who joins her school's broadcasting club in order to catch the person trying to reveal her secret. It aired on JTBC from November 17, 2020, to January 12, 2021.

== Synopsis ==
A story of love and friendship unfolds in a school where social media is a defining force and everybody is judged according to the person's looks, fashion sense and popularity.

Baek Ho-rang (Jung Da-bin), a high school student, is popular on social media for being pretty and classy, but her standoffish and cold behaviour in person earns her a considerable number of haters. One day, a strange message from an anonymous sender is read over the school radio. The message reminds Ho-rang of a traumatic episode from her past. An anonymous account has also been threatening to blackmail her by exposing her secret. Due to this, Ho-rang decides to join the broadcasting club, led by the perfectionist and overly time-conscious Go Eun-taek (Hwang Min-hyun), in order to track down the person attempting to defame her behind the keyboard.

== Cast ==
=== Main ===
- Jung Da-bin as Baek Ho-rang

Ho-rang is a student of Class 2-1 in Seoyeon High School and an anchorwoman of SHBS. She is a social media influencer renowned for being pretty and classy, but being standoffish and cold in person earns her also a considerable number of haters. Ho-rang joins Seoyeon's broadcasting club SHBS with an ulterior motive: to find out the person who is trying to divulge her long-hidden secret linked to a traumatic episode in her past.

- Hwang Min-hyun as Ko Eun-taek

Eun-taek is a student of Class 2-3 in Seoyeon High School and the manager of Seoyeon's broadcasting club SHBS. He lives a life that follows an exact, stringent timetable. Eun-taek is known by his clubmates for being a strict, perfectionist and overly time-conscious leader who does not put even a mere second to waste.

- Noh Jong-hyun as Do Woo-jae

Woo-jae is a student of Class 2-3 in Seoyeon High School and member of the student council. He is an often quiet person and acts rationally in any situation, complementing Eun-taek's perfectionist personality. Woo-jae has a dull face which brightens only when he sees Jae-yi.

- Yang Hye-ji as Ji So-hyun

So-hyun is a student of Class 2-3 in Seoyeon High School and deputy manager of SHBS; Ho-rang's former best friend. A model student with high grades, she was once more comfortable hanging out with boys until she became best friends with Ho-rang back in middle school. Her friendship with Ho-rang was severed due to misunderstandings and a tragic incident that happened to Ho-rang.

- Yeonwoo as Kang Jae-yi

Jae-yi is a student of Class 2-1 in Seoyeon High School; Woo-jae's girlfriend. She is an outspoken and simple-minded girl who is concerned with Woo-jae being hesitant to open up his thoughts to her.

- Choi Byung-chan as Kim Yoo-shin

Yoo-shin is Ho-rang's friend who is in Class 2-1 of Seoyeon High School. Compared with Ho-rang, he is a bubbly and easygoing person with an appearance of innocence and a bit of ingenuity. Yoo-shin likes So-hyun very much.

=== Supporting ===
==== SHBS Broadcasting Club ====
- Lee Se-hee as Jung Hee-soo

Hee-soo is a Class 2 student and member of the SHBS, who is revealed in later episodes to be the Internet troll attempting to reveal Ho-rang's tragic past to the public. She is one of Ho-rang's schoolmates back in middle school who detests her.

- Hyun Woo-seok as Kwon Sung-joon

Sung-joon is a junior student and a member of the SHBS.

- Woo Da-bi as Kim Eun-ha

A junior student and a member of the SHBS, Eun-ha aspires to become a great senior like So-hyun.

- Yang Jung-yeon as Kim Hee-won

A junior student and a member of the SHBS, Hee-won is baffled by how working in SHBS is harder than what she thought.

- Cho Jun-young as Park Young-jae

A junior student and a member of the SHBS, Young-jae considers it the best club in school and enjoys the life of radio broadcasting.

- Kim Eun-soo as Shin Jin-gook

Jin-gook is a Class 2 student and member of the SHBS.

==== Other students ====
- Wooyeon as Do Woo-sol

Woo-sol is Woo-jae's younger sister who acts like a love counselor between him and Jae-yi.

- Lee Won-jung as Lee Hun-jo, Jae-yi's boyfriend
- Shin Yun-seop as Jung-bin
- Choi Su-jin as Soo-jin
- Kang Hae-lim as Park Hye-rim
- Chung Su-bin as Lee Sun-Joo, a girl from Ho-rang's earlier life who beat her up in a key incident that Ho-rang tries to hide

=== Special appearances ===
- Lee Han-wi as school headmaster (Ep. 1-2)
- Ahn Se-ha as literature teacher (Ep. 1)
- Kim Hye-yoon as Seo Hyun-ah (Ep. 1)
- Yoon Yoo-sun as Ho-rang's mother (Ep. 3, 5, 7 & 8)
- Kim Jung-hak as Ho-rang's father (Ep. 3 & 5)
- Song Seon-mi as Eun-taek's mother (Ep. 4 & 7)
- Yeonjun as Kim Jin-woo, So-hyun's ex-boyfriend (Ep. 8)

== Episodes ==
No.	Title	Directed by	Written by	Original release date
1	"Episode 1"	Kim Sang-woo	Bang Yoo-jung	November 17, 2020
Ho-rang receives application offers from multiple clubs at Seoyeon High School, being a social media celebrity, but she rejects them all. After hearing a strange, triggering message from an anonymous sender being read over the school radio, she makes a last-minute application at the broadcasting club.
2	"Episode 2"	Kim Sang-woo	Bang Yoo-jung	November 24, 2020
Ho-rang's first days at the broadcasting club are marked with rebukes from Eun-taek, who is annoyed with her being late. After gaining access to the club's official social media page, she delves into the account of the Internet troll who sent the anonymous message. Much to her shock, Ho-rang sees a familiar name in its friends list.
3	"Episode 3"	Kim Sang-woo	Bang Yoo-jung	December 1, 2020
Ho-rang manages to get a reply from the troll but she is still confused of the account's real owner. As things get smoother between her and Eun-taek, Ho-rang receives an unexpected birthday gift from him.
4	"Episode 4"	Kim Sang-woo	Bang Yoo-jung	December 8, 2020
A straightforward Eun-taek confesses his feelings to Ho-rang. During the school festival, the broadcasting club's talk show, hosted by Ho-rang herself, goes trouble-free until the Internet troll makes an explosive revelation on social media.
5	"Episode 5"	Kim Sang-woo	Bang Yoo-jung	December 15, 2020
The broadcasting accident at the festival does not stop the budding romance between Ho-rang and Eun-taek. So-hyun watches a video recording in the club's laptop and makes an appalling discovery.
6	"Episode 6"	Kim Sang-woo	Bang Yoo-jung	December 22, 2020
At the school retreat, So-hyun manages to make Hee-soo admit her crimes to her, but the revelation comes with a painful realization to So-hyun. Ho-rang confronts Hee-soo, unaware of Hee-soo's scheme against her and So-hyun.
7	"Episode 7"	Kim Sang-woo	Bang Yoo-jung	December 29, 2020
Ho-rang becomes the object of unwanted criticisms among her peers and her relationships with Eun-taek, Yu-shin and Jae-yi start to falter. Hee-soo reveals to her the reason she is blackmailing her and warns her of another blackmailing if Ho-rang does not quit the broadcasting club.
8	"Episode 8"	Kim Sang-woo	Bang Yoo-jung	January 12, 2021 (Note: The episode was supposed to air on January 5, but was preempted to give way to the second part of JTBC News' annual New Year discussion centering on the country's future plans regarding the COVID-19 pandemic.)
Ho-rang finally opens up to her friends and to everyone at school about the truth of her past: that she is a victim of school violence two years ago. As the day of the school video festival begins, she ensures a closure between her and Hee-soo, while her relationships with the other classmates become stronger than before.

== Production ==
The first script reading took place on August 5, 2020.

== Original soundtrack ==
=== Album ===
Live On: Original Soundtrack

Soundtrack album by Various artists
- Released: January 13, 2021
- Genres: Soundtrack; K-pop
- Length: 57:23
- Languages: Korean; Japanese; English
- Labels: JTBC Studios; Playlist

The following is the official track list of Live On: Original Soundtrack album. The tracks with no indicated lyricists and composers are the drama's musical score; the artists indicated for these tracks are the tracks' composers themselves.

Live On: Original Soundtrack

No.	Title	Lyrics	Music	Artist	Length
1.	"Your Light"	Kim Ho-kyung	1601; Revin	TXT	3:38
2.	"Your Light" (Japanese ver.)	Kim Ho-kyung	1601; Revin	TXT	3:38
3.	"Naan" (난, lit. "Me")	Bibi	Bibi; The Need	Bibi	2:47
4.	"When My Loneliness Calls You" (나의 외로움이 널 부를 때)	Cho Dong-ik	Cho Dong-ik	Hoody; Bronze	4:18
5.	"When My Loneliness Calls You" (나의 외로움이 널 부를 때)	Cho Dong-ik	Cho Dong-ik	Jung Da-bin	4:17
6.	"Horang" (서연고 셀럽 백호랑, lit. "Baek Ho-rang, Seoyeon High School Celebrity")			Chung Seung-hyun; Park Tae-hyeon	1:48
7.	"First Meeting" (첫 만남)			Chung Seung-hyun; Park Tae-hyeon; Kim Jung-ju; Kim Jae-rim	2:22
8.	"Slowly"			Yang Sung-woo	2:33
9.	"Sushi"			Chung Seung-hyun; Park Tae-hyeon	2:11
10.	"Jei Day" (재이의 하루, lit. "Jae-yi's Day")			Kim Jung-ju; Kim Jae-rim	2:02
11.	"Love Poem"			Chung Seung-hyun; Na Hyun-ju	3:30
12.	"Recall"			Chung Seung-hyun; Na Hyun-ju	2:18
13.	"The moment that I met you"			Chung Seung-hyun; Park Tae-hyeon	2:47
14.	"Gagjaui Maeum" (각자의 마음, lit. "Each One's Heart")			Kim Jung-ju; Kim Jae-rim	2:04
15.	"Who are you" (너 누구야)			Chung Seung-hyun; Na Hyun-ju	2:36
16.	"Start" (시작)			Kim Jung-ju; Kim Jae-rim	1:52
17.	"Time Stopped" (멈춰버린 시간)			Chung Seung-hyun; Na Hyun-ju	3:02
18.	"Beside You"			Yang Sung-woo	2:27
19.	"Remember"			Chung Seung-hyun; Park Tae-hyeon	2:45
20.	"Jeongseo Bulan" (정서 불안, lit. "Feeling of Anxiousness")			Kim Jung-ju; Kim Jae-rim	2:09
21.	"That Summer" (그 때 여름)			Chung Seung-hyun; Na Hyun-ju	2:21
Total length:					57:23

=== Singles ===
The following is the track list of singles from Live On: Original Soundtrack.

Singles from Live On (Parts 1–4)

Part 1

Released on November 24, 2020
No.	Title	Lyrics	Music	Artist	Length
1.	"Your Light"	Kim Ho-kyung	1601; Revin	TXT	3:38
2.	"Your Light" (Japanese ver.)	Kim Ho-kyung	1601; Revin	TXT	3:38
3.	"Your Light" (Inst.)		1601; Revin		3:38
Total length:					10:54

Part 2

Released on December 8, 2020
No.	Title	Lyrics	Music	Artist	Length
1.	"Naan" (난, lit. "Me")	Bibi	Bibi; The Need	Bibi	2:47
2.	"Naan" (Inst.)		Bibi; The Need		2:47
Total length:					5:34

Part 3

Released on December 22, 2020
No.	Title	Lyrics	Music	Artist	Length
1.	"When My Loneliness Calls You" (나의 외로움이 널 부를 때)	Cho Dong-ik	Cho Dong-ik	Hoody; Bronze	4:18
2.	"When My Loneliness Calls You" (Inst.)		Cho Dong-ik		4:18
Total length:					8:36

Part 4

Released on December 29, 2020
No.	Title	Lyrics	Music	Artist	Length
1.	"When My Loneliness Calls You" (나의 외로움이 널 부를 때)	Cho Dong-ik	Cho Dong-ik	Jung Da-bin	4:17
2.	"When My Loneliness Calls You" (Inst.)		Cho Dong-ik		4:17
Total length:					8:34

== Ratings ==
Average TV viewership ratings
Ep.	Original broadcast date	Nationwide average audience share
1	November 17, 2020	1.302%
2	November 24, 2020	0.428%
3	December 1, 2020	0.604%
4	December 8, 2020	0.428%
5	December 15, 2020	0.727%
6	December 22, 2020	0.597%
7	December 29, 2020	0.622%
8	January 12, 2021	0.785%
Average		0.687%
The blue numbers represent the lowest ratings and the red numbers represent the highest ratings.; This drama airs on a cable channel/pay TV which normally has a relatively smaller audience compared to free-to-air TV/public broadcasters (KBS, SBS, MBC and EBS).

The popularity index of a drama is unusually high for a drama that is aired once a week. The popularity of the drama has been on the list of the previous episodes, and Hwang Min-hyun, who plays the role of the male protagonist Ko Eun-taek, has also been on the list of the cast members of the first and eighth episodes, respectively. The Lacoy index is also high, and the number of views of the first episode of YouTube, which was released only in Korea, has reached 2.5 million, showing a steady rise. (As of November 2021)

== International broadcast ==
The series will be available with multi-languages subtitles on iQIYI in South East Asia and Taiwan. The series will also be available on Viki with multi-languages subtitles.

== In other media ==
Bang Yoo-jung's screenplays for all episodes of Live On were published as one set on January 28, 2021 by Wisdom House. The screenplays are available for purchase both in print and e-book formats.
