= Minzy =

South Korean singer and rapper (born 1994)

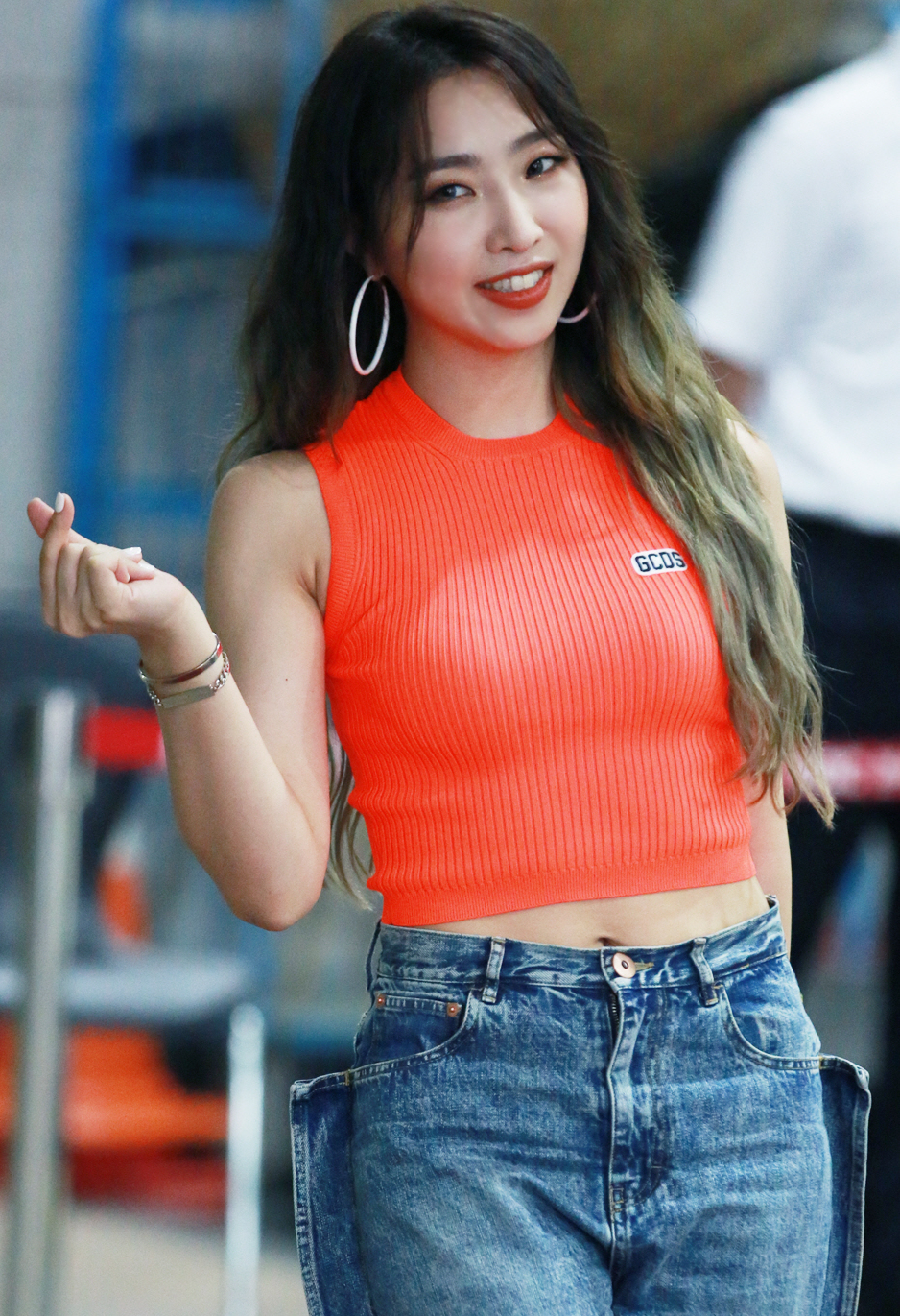
- Minzy in 2020
- Born: Gong Min-ji; January 18, 1994 (age 32); Seoul, South Korea
- Education: Baekseok University
- Occupations: Singer; dancer; rapper
- Musical career
- Genres: K-pop; R&B; hip hop
- Instrument: Vocals
- Years active: 2009–present
- Labels: YG; Music Works; MZ; Viva
- Member of: 2NE1
- Formerly of: Unnies

Korean name
- Hangul: 공민지
- Hanja: 孔旻智
- RR: Gong Minji
- MR: Kong Minji

Signature
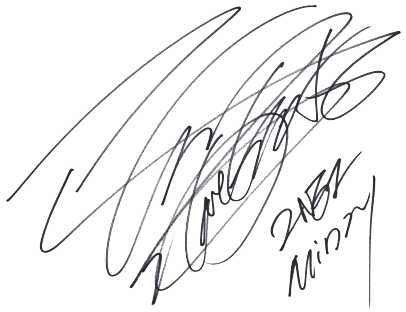

Gong Min-ji (Korean: 공민지; born January 18, 1994), known professionally as Minzy, is a South Korean singer, rapper and dancer. She debuted in 2009 as a member of South Korean girl group 2NE1, which became one of the best-selling girl groups worldwide before her departure in April 2016. She released her first solo EP, Minzy Work 01: "Uno", in April 2017.

== Early life ==
Minzy was born in Seoul, South Korea on January 18, 1994. She is the granddaughter of folk dancer Gong Ok-jin and, through her, a descendant of Confucius. When she was young, she moved to Gwangju with her family, but then her mother brought Minzy and her sister back to Seoul while traveling between Seoul and Gwangju to work with Minzy's father. She participated in many dance contests and competitions, winning various awards. A video of her at a dance competition in Gwangju was uploaded onto the Internet and became popular with many people sending praise for her ability to dance. This video was then uploaded onto YG's homepage, whereupon the CEO, Yang Hyun-suk, contacted and recruited her to join the agency when she was only in sixth grade.

== Career ==
=== 2009–2016: 2NE1 ===
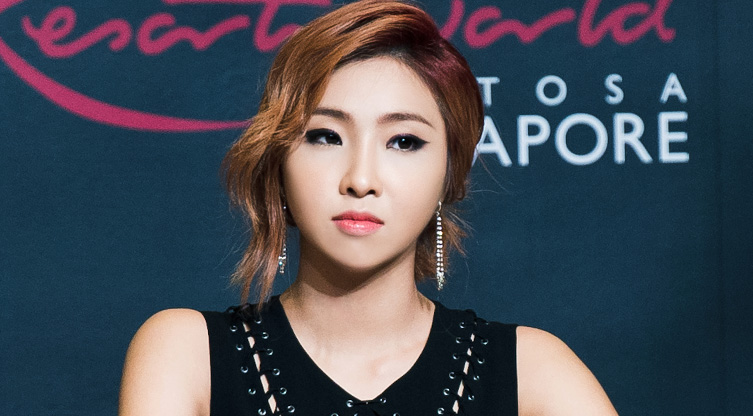
Minzy at a YG Family Press Conference in Singapore in September 2014

YG Entertainment stated in early 2009 that they would be debuting a four-member group that had been training for four years and that their debut album would contain songs produced by 1TYM's leader Teddy Park and G-Dragon of Big Bang. The group's name was initially announced as "21"; however, due to the discovery of a singer with the same name, the group was renamed "2NE1", with "NE" being an abbreviation of "New Evolution". Minzy was placed in 2NE1 as the main dancer, alongside Park Bom, Sandara Park and CL. The group went on to debut with their first single "Fire" in May 2009, with Minzy being the youngest member at just 15 years old. On November 20, 2009, CL and Minzy released a digital single, "Please Don't Go".

In October 2015, while 2NE1 was on hiatus, Minzy founded her own dance studio named the "Millennium Dance Academy" as a personal project, unconnected to YG Entertainment. The studio is based in Seoul, South Korea.

Minzy officially left the group and the group's agency, YG Entertainment, on April 5, 2016. Because of this, she did not take part in 2NE1's last song "Goodbye", released on January 21, 2017.

=== 2016–present: Solo career and MZ Entertainment ===
In May 2016, Minzy signed with CJ E&M's subsidiary label Music Works. It was revealed that Minzy is currently preparing for her solo album and is interested in trying out different types of music and doesn't want to limit herself to one specific genre. Music Works stated, "We are focusing on producing a first solo album which can portray all of Gong Minzy's talent and potential. We will continue the preparations without being chased by time".

On January 17, 2017, a representative from KBS revealed that Minzy has been confirmed as a cast member of the second season of Sister's Slam Dunk together with Kim Sook, Hong Jin-kyung, Kang Ye-won, Han Chae-young, Hong Jin-young and Jeon So-mi. The show aired its first broadcast on February 10, where Minzy was appointed to become the main singer, main dancer, dance tutor, and choreographer for the second generation of Unnies by legendary producer and composer Kim Hyung Suk (mentor of JYP), and was voted as leader of the group on the third episode. She is also qualified to be the team's rap teacher, but due to her heavy workload, the role went to LA-born newcomer KillaGramz. In episode 12, she was named the rapping director as Kim Hyung Suk has no rapping knowledge, and named Hong Jin-young as the sole rapper of the group, with Jeon So-mi the rap lyricist for "Right?". In March 2017, Minzy released her first solo single, "I Wanted to Love" as the soundtrack of the MBC drama The Rebel

On April 17, 2017, Minzy released her solo debut EP, Minzy Work 01. "Uno", along with title track "Ninano". The EP debuted at number 2 on the Billboard World Albums chart as the highest-ranking debut before it fell to number 9 in the second week. On September 28, Minzy announced she would go on tour in North America, however the tour was postponed and then cancelled due to her working on new music. On December 1, 2018, Minzy released her first English language solo single, "All of You Say".

On April 17, 2020, Minzy left Music Works after her legal dispute was settled. On May 24, 2020, Minzy released her single "Lovely", her first released as an independent artist. In October 2020, Minzy founded her own company MZ Entertainment and will carry out her future activities on her future agency. A month later, Minzy signed with Viva Entertainment for her musical activities in the Philippines. She released the Tagalog version of her single "Lovely" on November 20, 2020.

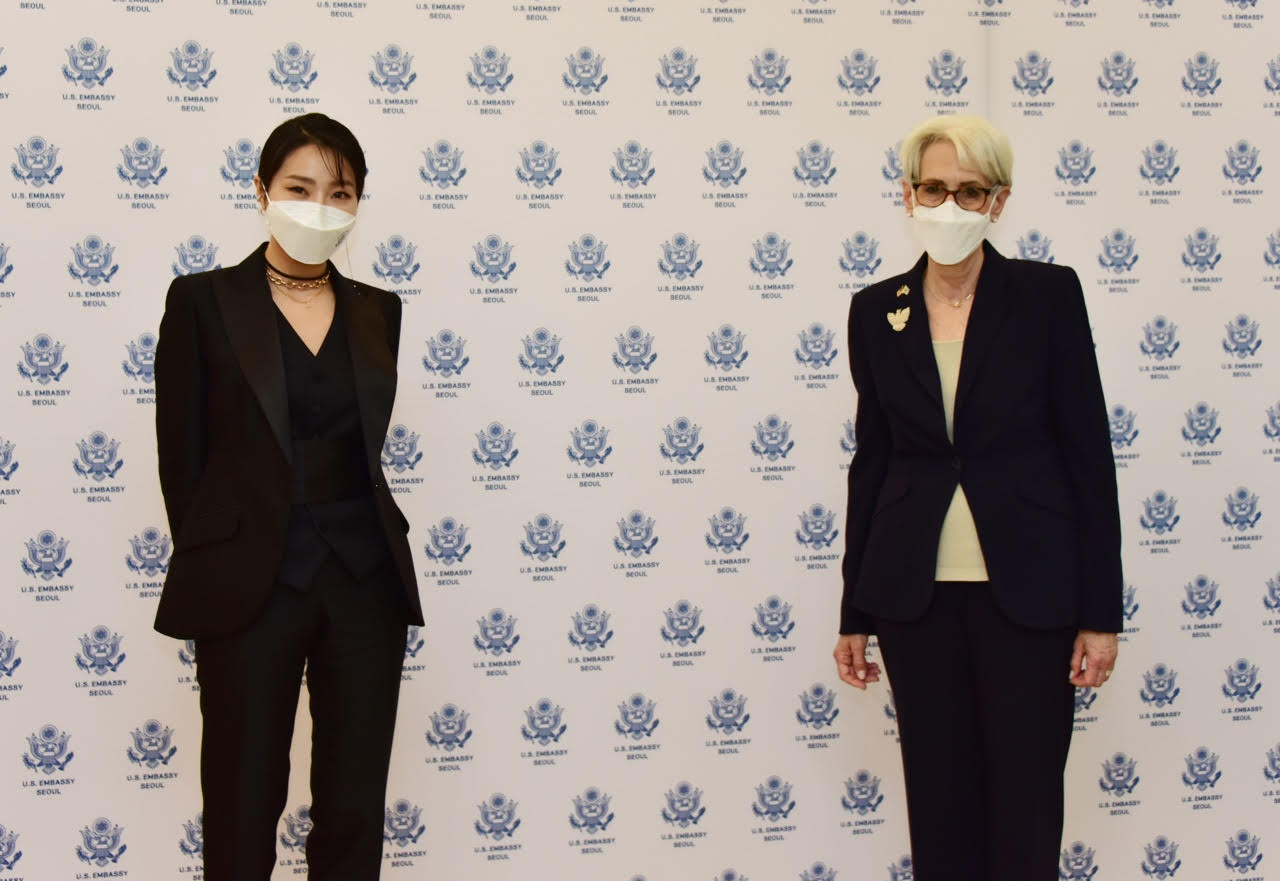
Minzy with US Deputy Secretary Wendy Sherman in a climate change event with Korean youth in Seoul, July 2021

On June 6, 2021, MZ Entertainment announced that Minzy was planning for a comeback with a single that July. The single, titled "Teamo", was released on July 11. On December 12, 2021, Minzy released the single "Fantabulous".

== Personal life ==
In August 2017, Minzy graduated from Baekseok University magna cum laude from the Department of Theology.

== Discography ==
=== Extended plays ===
Title	Album details	Peak chart positions				Sales
Title	Album details	KOR	NZ Heat	US Heat	US World	Sales
Minzy Work 01: "Uno"	Released: April 17, 2017; Label: The Music Works, Sony Music; Formats: CD, digital download	10	10	21	2	KOR: 3,347

=== Singles ===
Title	Year	Peak chart positions		Sales	Album
Title	Year	KOR	US World	Sales	Album
Korean
"Please Don't Go" (with CL)	2009	7	—	—N/a	To Anyone
"Ninano" (니나노) (featuring Flowsik)	2017	44	18	KOR: 38,531	Minzy Work 01: Uno
"Lovely" (Note: "Lovely (Filipino Version)" was released as a digital single on November 20, 2020.)	2020	— (Note: "Lovely" didn't enter the Gaon Digital Chart, but peaked at number 71 on the component BGM chart.)	—	—N/a	Non-album singles
"Teamo"	2021	— (Note: "Teamo" didn't enter the Gaon Digital Chart, but peaked at number 55 on the component Download chart.)	6	—N/a	Non-album singles
"Fantabulous" (기깔나)	2021	— (Note: "Fantabulous" didn't enter the Gaon Digital Chart, but peaked at number 181 on the component Download chart.)	—	—N/a	Non-album singles
English
"All of You Say"	2018	—	—	—N/a	Non-album single
"—" denotes releases that did not chart or were not released in that region.

=== Soundtrack appearances ===
Title	Year	Album
"I Wanted to Love"	2017	The Rebel
"I Miss You" (보고 싶다) (With Sohyang)	2017	The King of Mask Singer Episode 105
"Sick and Sick Name..." (아프고 아픈 이름...)	2017	The King of Mask Singer Episode 105
"Walking" (걸어가)	2018	Partners for Justice
"My Everything"	2021	The Playlist
"As I Told You" (with Taeil)	2021	Watcha Original <Double Trouble> Episode.1 Black Swan
"Must Have Love" (with Inseong)	2022	Watcha Original <Double Trouble> Episode.2 Crown
"Energetic" (with Inseong)	2022	Watcha Original <Double Trouble> Episode.3 Sporty
"When We Disco" (with Jang Hyun-seung)	2022	Watcha Original <Double Trouble> Episode.4 Legend Duet
"Me Gustas Tu" (with Taeil)	2022	Watcha Original <Double Trouble> Episode.5 History

== Filmography ==
=== Film ===
Year	Title	Role	Notes	Ref.
2022	Lovely Voice: The Beginning		Musical Film	

=== Television shows ===
Year	Title	Role	Notes	Ref.
2017	Sister's Slam Dunk	Cast member		
2017	King of Mask Singer	Contestant	As "A Richly-toned Perilla Leaf Girl"	
2021	South Korean Foreigners	Contestant		
2021	Wild Idol	Trainer Corps		
2022	The Origin – A, B, Or What?	Judge		
2022	9low On Top	Judge	Thai audition program	

=== Web shows ===
Year	Title	Role	Ref.
2021	Double Trouble	Contestant	

== Awards and nominations ==
Name of the award ceremony, year presented, category, nominee of the award, and the result of the nomination
Award ceremony	Year	Category	Nominee / Work	Result	Ref.
Korea Grand Prize Awards	2021	10 People Who Shined Korea – Artist Award	Minzy	Won	
