= Noh Jong-hyun =

South Korean actor

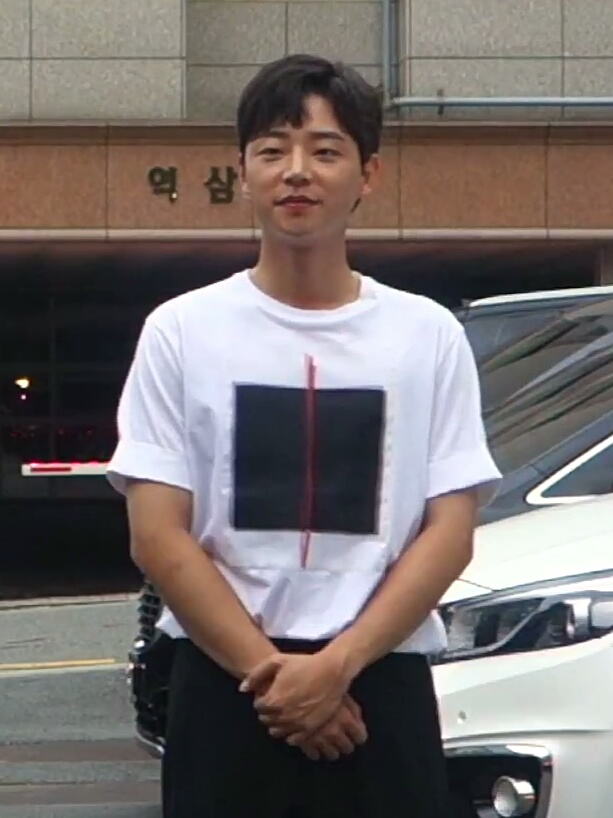
- Noh at the Life on Mars wrap-up party in August 2018
- Born: January 16, 1993 (age 33); Busan, South Korea
- Education: Dongguk University – Theater and Film
- Occupation: Actor
- Years active: 2017–present
- Agent: Vibe Actors

Korean name
- Hangul: 노종현
- RR: No Jonghyeon
- MR: No Chonghyŏn

Noh Jong-hyun (born January 16, 1993) is a South Korean actor.

== Career ==
Noh Jong-hyun made his television debut in the 2017 romantic comedy Because This Is My First Life in which he portrayed the female lead's little brother. The following year, he appeared in OCN's miniseries Short and gained more recognition after playing the youngest detective of the team in Life on Mars, adapted from the British television series of the same name.

In 2019, Noh made a cameo appearance in Romance Is a Bonus Book. He then portrayed the male lead's best friend in tvN's He Is Psychometric. He also joined the cast of Hell Is Other People, adapted from the webtoon of the same name.

In 2020, Noh appeared in Blackout, an episode of Drama Stage's third season. He was also cast in Kkondae Intern and Live On. He will also make his film debut in A Mathematician in Wonderland.

In 2021, Noh is set to star in Youth, a television series based on the BTS Universe.

== Filmography ==
=== Film ===
Year	Title	Role	Ref.
2020	A Mathematician in Wonderland	Ddal-bong	

=== Television series ===
Year	Title	Role	Notes	Ref.
2017	Because This Is My First Life	Yoon Ji-seok		
2018	Short	Maeng Man-bok		
2018	Life on Mars	Jo Nam-sik		
2019	Romance Is a Bonus Book	Ji-yool's ex-boyfriend	Cameo (Ep. 2–3)	
2019	He Is Psychometric	Lee Dae-bong		
2019	Hell Is Other People	Kang Seok-yoon		
2020	Drama Stage	Substitute driver	Episode: "Blackout"	
2020	Kkondae Intern	Joo Yoon-soo		
2020	Live On	Do Woo-jae		
2023–2024	The Story of Park's Marriage Contract	Lee Seok-joo		

=== Web series ===
Year	Title	Role	Ref.
2023	Duty After School	Jang Yeong-hoon	
2024	Begins ≠ Youth	Min Ce-in	

=== Music video appearances ===
Year	Song title	Artist	Ref.
2015	"Respect"	Loco (feat. Gray & DJ Pumkin)	
2017	"Fall in Love" (비처럼)	Hong Dae-kwang	

== Awards and nominations ==
Year	Award	Category	Nominated work	Result	Ref.
2020	39th MBC Drama Awards	Best New Actor	Kkondae Intern	Nominated	
