= Choi Bo-min (entertainer) =

South Korean singer and actor (born 2000)

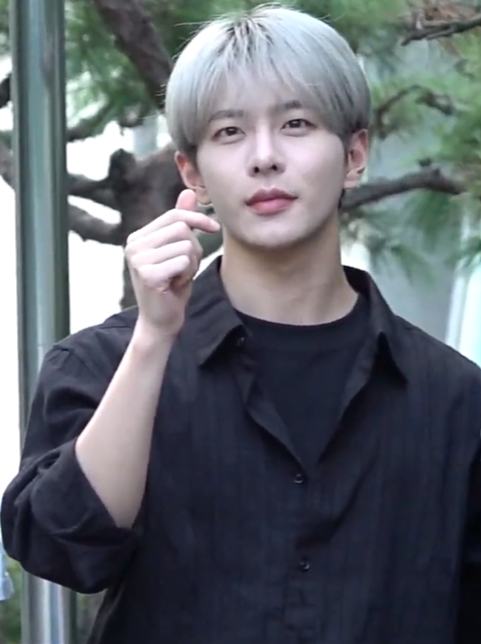
- Bomin in August 2022
- Born: August 24, 2000 (age 26); Yongin, Gyeonggi Province, South Korea
- Education: Hanlim Multi Art School
- Occupations: Singer; actor
- Musical career
- Genre: K-pop
- Instrument: Vocals
- Years active: 2017–present
- Label: Woollim
- Formerly of: Golden Child

Korean name
- Hangul: 최보민
- Hanja: 崔普閔
- RR: Choe Bomin
- MR: Ch'oe Pomin

Choi Bo-min (born August 24, 2000), known mononymously as Bomin, is a South Korean singer, actor and host. He is a former member of Golden Child. He made his acting debut with a lead role in the web-drama A-Teen 2 (2019) and hosted the KBS music program Music Bank from July 5, 2019, to July 17, 2020.

== Early life and family ==
Born on August 24, 2000, in Giheung-gu, Yongin, Gyeonggi Province, South Korea. He is the eldest of two siblings and his younger sister, Choi Seo-bin is a singer, dancer and K-pop idol who is a member of BPM Entertainment's 7-member K-pop girl group Badvillain under the stage name Vin. Bomin attended Hanlim Multi Art School.

== Career ==
=== 2017–present: Debut with Golden Child and solo activities ===
Pre-debut, in May 2017, Bomin appeared in the MV for Lovelyz single Now, We.

Bomin officially debuted with Golden Child on August 28, 2017, with their first EP Gol-cha!, with a total of six tracks including the title track "DamDaDi". Their debut showcase was held at the Blue Square iMarket Hall on the same day as the album's release.

Bomin made his acting debut in the second season of A-Teen, playing the role of Ryu Joo-ha. In May, Bomin joined the cast for SBS's reality show Law of the Jungle in Chatham Islands. In June 2019, Bomin was named the official brand model for cosmetics company Lilybyred.

Bomin hosted the music program Music Bank with actress Shin Ye-eun from July 2019 to July 2020. Bomin was cast in the romantic comedy drama Melting Me Softly.

In September 2020, Bomin played the role of Seo Ji-ho in the JTBC fantasy drama 18 Again. In October 2020, Bomin starred in a CF, or commercial film, for the LG Wing.

In February 2021, Bomin was named an official brand model for cosmetics label Etude.

On July 8, 2021, Bomin has been cast in the upcoming drama Shadow Beauty.

On September 29, 2022, his agency announced that he got injured in the face the day before with a wooden club, while he was practicing golf.

On August 27, 2024, Woollim Entertainment announced that Bomin, along with members Tag and Kim Ji-beom, did not renew their contracts and departed from the group.

== Ambassadorship ==
- Tourism Ambassador for Tourism Promotions Board of the Philippines (2025)

== Filmography ==
=== Film ===
Year	Title	Role	Ref.
2025	Ghost Train	Woo-jin	

=== Television series ===
Year	Title	Role	Notes	Ref.
2019	Melting Me Softly	Hwang Ji-hoon		
2020	18 Again	Seo Ji-ho		
2025	Crushology 101	Student	Cameo (Ep. 1)	
2025	Beauty Empire	Alex Jang	Philippine drama	
2025	Spirit Fingers	Goo Seon-ho		
TBA	Hyeopban	Jo Sik		

=== Web series ===
Year	Title	Role	Notes	Ref.
2019	A-Teen 2	Ryu Joo-ha		
2020	Twenty-Twenty	Ryu Joo-ha	Cameo (Ep. 1)	
2021	Shadow Beauty	Kim Ho-in		
2026	My Little Chef	Yoo Tae-woo		
TBA	My Favorite, Who Became a Ghost, Came Back!	Do-ha		

=== Television shows ===
Year	Title	Role	Notes	Ref.
2019	Law of the Jungle in Chatham Islands	Cast member	Ep. 360–362	
2019	Music Bank	Host	with Shin Ye-eun	
2020	Soomi's Side Dishes	Cast member	Ep. 83–90	

== Awards and nominations ==
Year	Award	Category	Nominated work	Result	Ref.
2019	V Live Awards	Favorite Web Series Actor	A-Teen 2	Won	
2019	2019 KBS Entertainment Awards	Best Couple Award (with Shin Ye-eun)	Music Bank	Won	
2019	2019 KBS Entertainment Awards	Rookie Award	Music Bank	Nominated	
2024	Asia Artist Awards	Potential Award	Ghost Train	Won	
