= Ghost Train (2025 film) =

2025 film by Tak Se-woong

- Theatrical release poster
- Hangul: 괴기열차
- RR: Goegiyeolcha
- MR: Koegiyŏlch'a
- Directed by: Tak Se-woong
- Written by: Jo Ba-reun
- Produced by: Kim Young-min; Pyun Kyung-woo
- Starring: Joo Hyun-young; Jeon Bae-soo; Choi Bo-min
- Cinematography: Kwon Yeong-il
- Edited by: Kim U-il
- Music by: Jo Seongjin
- Production companies: Making A Print; Dimix Studio
- Distributed by: Next Entertainment World
- Release date: July 9, 2025
- Running time: 94 minutes
- Country: South Korea
- Language: Korean
- Box office: US$704,885

Ghost Train (Korean: 괴기열차) is a 2025 South Korean horror mystery film directed by Tak Se-woong and starring Joo Hyun-young, Jeon Bae-soo, and Choi Bo-min. The film depicts Da Kyung, a horror YouTuber hungry for attention, delves into the eerie mysteries of Gwanglim Station, a place plagued by a string of unexplained disappearances.

It was released theatrically on July 9, 2025 in South Korea.

== Cast ==
- Joo Hyun-young as Da-kyung
- Jeon Bae-soo as the stationmaster
- Choi Bo-min as Woo-jin
- Kim Ji-in as Hye-jin

== Production ==
Choi Bo-min was added to cast in February 2024 as producer of Youtube content. Kim Ji-in was also joined the cast to play convenience store worker in February 2024.

Filming began on January 5, 2024.

== Release ==
Ghost Train was released in South Korean theaters on July 9, 2025. It has been pre-sold to Asia, including Japan, Taiwan, Singapore, Mongolia, India, Vietnam, Malaysia, and Cambodia, as well as Eastern Europe, North America, and South America.

== Reception ==
=== Box office ===
The film was released on July 9, 2025 on 572 screens. It opened at the first place on the Korean box office among concurrently opening films. It surpassed 100,000 cumulative viewers on July 26, 2025.

As of August 3, 2025, the film has grossed US$704,885 from 105,262 admissions.
