= Count (2023 film) =

- Theatrical release poster
- Hangul: 카운트
- RR: Kaunteu
- MR: K'aunt'ŭ
- Directed by: Kwon Hyuk-jae
- Written by: Kim Jin-ah; Hong Chang-pyo
- Produced by: Kim Jeong-min; Cha Sang-min
- Starring: Jin Seon-kyu; Sung Yoo-bin; Oh Na-ra; Ko Chang-seok; Jang Dong-joo; Ko Kyu-pil; Kim Min-ho
- Cinematography: Lee Seong-jae
- Edited by: Lee Kang-hee
- Music by: Lee Jin-hee
- Production companies: Filmmaker R & K 26 Company
- Distributed by: CJ Entertainment
- Release date: February 22, 2023
- Running time: 109 minutes
- Country: South Korea
- Language: Korean
- Box office: US$2.9 million

Count (Korean: 카운트; RR: Kaunteu), also known as Countdown, is a 2023 South Korean comedy-drama film directed by Kwon Hyuk-jae. Based on former boxer Park Si-hun, it stars Jin Seon-kyu as Park, along with Sung Yoo-bin, Oh Na-ra, Ko Chang-seok, Jang Dong-joo, Ko Kyu-pil, and Kim Min-ho. The film was theatrically released on February 22, 2023.

== Plot ==
In 1988, Si-hun won an Olympic gold medal. Ten years later, he lives an ordinary life as a high school teacher. Since retiring from boxing, all that remains is his stubbornness, and his relentless "my way" attitude frustrates everyone around him.

One day, at a boxing tournament he attends by chance, Si-hun witnesses a talented young boxer, Yoon-woo, unfairly forced to forfeit due to match fixing. Outraged by the injustice, Si-hun decides to form a boxing club at his school. Despite fierce opposition from his wife Il-seon and persistent discouragement from the school principal, Si-hun presses on. He takes under his wing the fiery and determined Yoon-woo, along with two unexpected recruits, Hwan-joo and Bok-an, who have no idea what they've gotten themselves into. Together, they embark on an intense and unpredictable training journey.

== Cast ==
- Jin Seon-kyu as Park Si-hun
- Sung Yoo-bin as Yoon-woo
- Oh Na-ra as Il-seonk
- Ko Chang-seok as Principal
- Jang Dong-joo as Hwan-ju
- Ko Kyu-pil as Man-deok
- Kim Min-ho as Bok-an
- Lee Hong-nae as Dong-soo
- Cha Soon-bae as Association President
- Choi Woo-hyuk as Byung-wook
- Park Sung-geun as Chairman of the Korean Sports Council

== Production ==
=== Background ===
Count was inspired by real-life events surrounding former Olympic boxer Park Si-hun, who won a controversial gold medal at the 1988 Seoul Olympics. The film follows a retired boxer turned high school teacher who mentors troubled students while confronting his past. Jin Seon-kyu, in his first lead role, was drawn to the film due to its setting in his hometown, Jinhae. He had been practicing boxing for ten years before taking on the role, which helped him prepare for the character. To further enhance his performance, he underwent additional boxing training near the filming location.

=== Filming ===
Count was filmed in Jinhae, a district of Changwon, South Korea, known for its naval base and cultural heritage. The film captures the local dialect and traditions, including the distinct linguistic differences between Jinhae and nearby cities like Busan. Jin noted that while Jinhae is also part of South Gyeongsang Province, its dialect differs from Busan's, leading to minor linguistic adjustments during production.

== Themes ==
Count explores themes of resilience and personal growth, drawing parallels between the protagonist's struggles and the broader societal challenges of the time. It also touches on Korea's evolving sports culture and the moral dilemmas athletes face in pursuit of victory. The 1988 Seoul Olympics, a significant moment in Korean sports history, serves as a backdrop for the protagonist's past and influences his mentorship style.

Count also indirectly critiques the controversial aspects of Olympic judging and fairness in sports, referencing real-life debates surrounding Park Si-hun's gold medal victory.

== Release ==
Count was released theatrically on February 22, 2023.

=== Home media ===
The film was made available for streaming on September 16, 2023 through tvN Movies under the title Countdown.
