= Pitta (album) =

Vol. 8 - PITTA

Studio album by Baek Ji-young
- Released: May 19, 2011
- Genre: K-pop
- Length: 46:28
- Label: LOEN Entertainment; WS Entertainment
- Producer: Bang Si Hyuk

Baek Ji-young chronology
EGO [EP] (2009)	Vol. 8 - PITTA (2011)	Good Boy [EP] (2012)

Singles from Pitta
- 1. "Botong (보통; Ordinary)" Released: May 2012

Pitta (stylized as "Vol. 8 - PITTA") is the eighth studio album by South Korean singer Baek Ji-young. The singer stated that the album was named after the Pitta bird, known for its colorful plumage.

== Track listing ==
List of tracks:

Pitta track listing
No.	Title	Length
1.	"Lost Star"	3:18
2.	"Botong (보통; Ordinary)" (feat. Oh Ji Ho)	3:29
3.	"Nuneun Wae Gamneun Geonde (눈은 왜 감는 건데; Why close your eyes)"	3:41
4.	"Bad Girl"	3:30
5.	"I Can't Drink (아이캔트드링크)"	3:08
6.	"Amugeotdo Anin Deut (아무것도 아닌 듯; s Nothing Had Happened At All)"	3:35
7.	"Love Game"	3:20
8.	"Sigani Jinamyeon (시간이 지나면; As Time Goes By)"	4:15
9.	"Anhaeyo (안해요; No Fear)"	4:13
10.	"Neomu Sileun Il (너무 싫은 일; Hard to Do)"	3:39
11.	"Musiro (무시로; Anytime)"	3:25
12.	"Botong" (instrumental)	3:27
13.	"Bad Girl" (instrumental)	3:28
Total length:		46:28

== Charting ==
Chart	Top position
South Korea (Gaon Weekly Chart)	2

== Release history ==
Country	Release date	Format	Label
South Korea	May 19, 2011	Digital Download	WS Entertainment, LOEN Entertainment
Worldwide	May 19, 2011	Digital Download	WS Entertainment, LOEN Entertainment
South Korea	May 23, 2011	CD	LOEN Entertainment
United States	June 28, 2011	Import	LOEN Entertainment
Japan	June 28, 2011	Import	LOEN Entertainment
