= Cho Jun-young =

South Korean actor (born 2002)

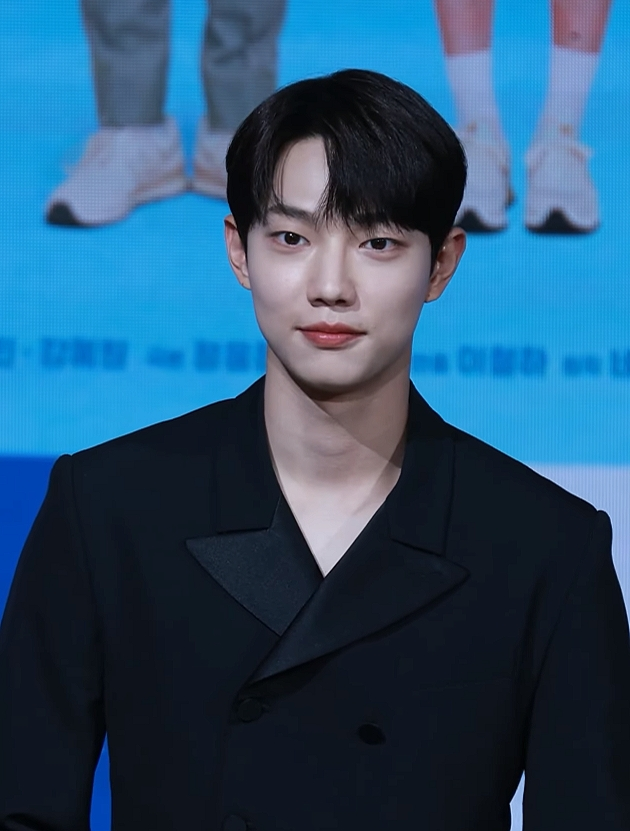
- Cho in October 2025
- Born: December 26, 2002 (age 23); South Korea
- Education: School of Performing Arts Seoul; Sungkyunkwan University
- Occupation: Actor
- Years active: 2020–present
- Agent: SM Entertainment

Korean name
- Hangul: 조준영
- RR: Jo Junyeong
- MR: Cho Chunyŏng
- Website: smtown.com

Cho Jun-young (Korean: 조준영; born December 26, 2002) is a South Korean actor under SM Entertainment.

== Filmography ==
=== Film ===
Year	Title	Role	Ref.
2021	A Year-End Medley	Park Se-jik	
TBA	Nambeol	Chang Rak	

=== Television series ===
Year	Title	Role	Ref.
2020	Live On	Park Young-jae	
2021	Idol: The Coup	Han Seon-woo (Ray)	
2022	Dear.M	Ban Yi-dam	
2023	All That We Loved	Go Joon-hee	
2024	O’PENing 2024 – "Million Dollar Baby"	Hwang Eun-deun	
2025	Crushology 101	Cha Ji-won	
2026	Spring Fever	Seon Han-gyeol	

=== Web series ===
Year	Title	Role	Ref.
2025	Heesu in Class 2	Joo Chan-young	
2025	Spirit Fingers	Nam Gi-jung (Red Finger)	

== Awards and nominations ==
Name of the award ceremony, year presented, category, nominee of the award, and the result of the nomination
Award ceremony	Year	Category	Nominee / Work	Result	Ref.
MBC Drama Awards	2025	Best New Actor	Crushology 101	Nominated	
