= B.O.Y =

South Korean musical duo

- Also known as: Kim Kookheon x Song Yuvin (2019)
- Origin: South Korea
- Genres: K-pop; R&B
- Years active: 2019–2021
- Label: Music Works
- Spinoff of: Myteen
- Past members: Kim Kook-heon; Song Yuvin
- Website: Official website

B.O.Y (Korean: 비오브유; RR: Biobeuyu; acronym of and pronounced as B. Of You), formerly known as Kim Kookheon x Song Yuvin (김국헌x송유빈), was a South Korean pop duo formed by The Music Works in 2019, following the disbandment of the boygroup Myteen. The duo disbanded on April 30, 2021.

== Name ==
The group's name was suggested by netizens through their official fancafe and was chosen by the members. It stands for "Best of You" and "Both of You", referring to the two members of B.O.Y, or the duo and their fans. It was chosen out of over 2,000 suggestions.

== History ==
=== 2016–2021: Formation, debut, and disbandment ===
Following Yuvin's solo debut in May 2016, Music Works announced that they would debut their first boygroup in 2017. Myteen went under a year of pre-debut promotions through various busking performances and a reality show. Myteen made their debut in July 2017 with the release of their extended play Myteen Go!. In October 2017, Kookheon participated in the survival show Mix Nine and made it into the finale. Myteen released their sophomore extended play F;uzzle in July 2018. The septet made their Japanese debut in October 2018 with the Japanese version of She Bad.

From March 2019 to July 2019, Kookheon and Yuvin participated in the survival show Produce X 101. Kookheon was eliminated during the penultimate episode while Yuvin reached the finale but didn't make it into X1. On August 8, Music Works announced that Kookheon and Yuvin would launch a duet unit together during the month. It was revealed on August 19 that the duo would release a special digital single on August 24. A physical edition of Blurry was later released on September 19. Following Myteen's disbandment on August 21, the duo became an independent act. They held their first fanmeeting "The Present" on August 31.

In November 2019, the duet became cast members of the variety show All Together ChaChaCha. On November 1, their agency announced the duet would hold their first concert titled "Dear, You" on December 24–25 where they will showcase the songs from their first extended play before its release early 2020. On November 12, Music Works revealed their official team name to be B.O.Y. On December 9, Music Works announced the duo was set to debut on January 7, 2020. From December 23 onwards, the group started teasing their debut extended play Phase One: You and revealed the album's tracklist on December 31, including the members' self-composed track "Starlight". The duo held their debut stage on the January 2 episode of Mnet's M! Countdown.

On September 1, 2020, the group announced that they would be returning with their second extended play Phase Two: We and its title track "Miss You" (보고싶다) on September 15, 2020.

On December 5, B.O.Y appeared on the South Korean television program Immortal Songs: Singing the Legend. They performed a cover of BoA "ID; Peace B" alongside Na Haeun and won the episode based on the votes made by 20 judges. This win made them the second fourth-generation group (After ATEEZ) to win on the program, and the seventh idol group overall.

On April 30, 2021, The Music Works announced that Yuvin's contract expired and that he left the company. As a result, B.O.Y would officially disband and end activities.

== Discography ==
=== Extended plays ===
Title	Album details	Peak chart positions	Sales
Title	Album details	KOR	Sales
Phase One: You	Released: January 7, 2020; Label: The Music Works, Genie Music; Formats: CD, digital download; Tracklist: 1. Starlight (별, 빛); 2. My Angel; 3. Got Your Back; 4. Clock (시계바늘); 5. Lighthouse	6	KOR: 13,065
Phase Two: We	Released: September 15, 2020; Label: The Music Works, Genie Music; Formats: CD, digital download; Tracklist: 1. We; 2. Blank; 3. Butterfly; 4. PS; 5. Miss You (보고싶다)	16	KOR: 8,703

=== Singles ===
List of singles, with selected chart positions, showing year released and album name
Title	Year	Peak chart positions		Sales	Album
Title	Year	KOR Gaon		Sales	Album
Title	Year	Digital	Album	Sales	Album
"Blurry" (Note: Released as Kim Kookheon x Song Yuvin)	2019	—	11	KOR: 3,988 (CD)	Non-album single
"My Angel"	2020	—	*		Phase One : You
"Clock" (시계바늘)	2020	—	*		Phase One : You
"Miss You" (보고싶다)	2020	—	*		Phase Two : We
"—" denotes releases that did not chart or were not released in that region.

== Filmography ==
=== Television shows ===
Date	Title	Role	Network	Note
2019	All Together ChaChaCha	Cast members	SBS Plus	
2020	Honey Song Trip	Cast members	Seezn	

== Concerts ==
=== Headlining concerts ===
- Dear, You (2019)

=== Fanmeetings ===
- The Present (2019)
- 1st Fanmeeting in Japan (2020)
