= Spirit Fingers (TV series) =

2025 South Korean television series

- Promotional poster
- Hangul: 스피릿 핑거스
- RR: Seupirit pinggeoseu
- MR: Sŭp'irit p'inggŏsŭ
- Genre: Coming of age; Romance
- Created by: Jeong Yoon-jeong
- Based on: Spirit Fingers by Han Kyoung-chal
- Written by: Kwon Ee-ji
- Directed by: Lee Cheol-ha
- Starring: Park Ji-hu; Cho Jun-young; Choi Bo-min; Park You-na
- Country of origin: South Korea
- Original language: Korean
- No. of episodes: 12

Production
- Production companies: Number Three Pictures; Kenaz; MI Inc.

Original release
- Network: TVING
- Release: October 29 – November 26, 2025

Spirit Fingers (Korean: 스피릿 핑거스) is a South Korean television series starring Park Ji-hu, Cho Jun-young, Choi Bo-min, and Park You-na. Based on Naver Webtoon of the same name by Han Kyoung-chal, it tells the story of Song Woo-yeon, a shy high school student, discovers her voice and passion, learning to express herself and love who she is. It premiered on TVING on October 29, 2025, and aired every Wednesday. It is also available for streaming on Viki in select regions.

== Synopsis ==
Song Woo-yeon is an overlooked high school student who feels invisible at home, where her family prioritizes her brothers, leading to low self-esteem and a lack of self-expression. She is approached by Koo Seon-ho and the vibrant members of Spirit Fingers, a sketch club, and asked to model for them. As she joins the group, their positivity and encouragement help boost her self-esteem.

== Cast and characters ==
=== Main ===
- Park Ji-hu as Song Woo-yeon (Baby Blue Finger)
  - Park So-ye as young Woo-yeon

A high school girl who lacks self-confidence. She is shy and doesn't dare to express herself. But after she meets the Spirit Fingers Club, her boring life becomes lively again.

- Cho Jun-young as Nam Gi-jeong (Red Finger)

A charismatic high school student with a part-time gig as a fitting model and Gue-rin's younger brother. He has never experienced true love. After Woo-yeon appears, he begins to have dreams and love like everyone else.

- Choi Bo-min as Koo Seon-ho (Blue Finger)

The vice president of the Spirit Fingers Club, he has a gentle personality and is a handsome boy who is popular among everyone in university. With his good looks and outstanding talent in arts and sports.

- Park You-na as Nam Geu-rin (Mint Finger)

The president of the Spirit Fingers club and Gi-jeong's older sister. She cheerful and bright who takes care of Song Woo-yeon like her little sister.

=== Supporting ===
==== Spirit Fingers Club ====
- Kwon So-hyun as Hwang Bun-hong (Pink Finger)
- Kim Seul-gi as Ko Taeng-ja (Black Finger)
- Lee Jin-hyuk as Kwon Hyeok (Khaki Finger)
- Im Chul-soo as Jang Dong-geon (Brown Finger)

==== People around Woo-yeon ====
- Eun Yeo-jin as Yeom Se-ra

Woo-yeon's best friend who is smart and charming. She lives with her father after he divorces her mother.

- Chae Soo-ha as Jo Mi-rae

Woo-yeon's best friend.

- Kim Hye-eun as Seong Kyeong

Woo-yeon's mother, who gave up her ballet career to care for her children.

- Ki Eun-yoo as Song Woo-dol

Woo-yeon's younger brother, who is intelligent and mature beyond his years.

- Son Hyun-woo as Song Woo-seok

Woo-yeon's older brother, who is studying medicine and only returns home occasionally.

- Joo Suk-tae as Woo-yeon's father

Woo-yeon's father is a teacher and has high hopes for his children's academic performance.

==== People around Gi-jeong ====
- Kang Hye-won as Ahn Ye-rim
- Cha Woo-min as Byun Tae-seon

Gi-jeong's best friend.

- Ham Sung-min as Oh Dae-oh

Gi-jeong's best friend.

== Production ==
Spirit Fingers was created by Jeong Yoon-jeong, written by Kwon Ee-ji, directed by Lee Cheol-ha, and produced by Number Three Pictures, Kenaz and MI Inc. The series is based on Naver Webtoon of the same name by Han Kyoung-chal.

In February 2023, Park Ji-hu and Cho Jun-young were reportedly set to star. The next month, Choi Bo-min was cast as the lead. On April 4, Park You-na was reportedly cast. On April 6, Cha Woo-min joined the cast. On April 13, Park Ji-hu, Jo Joon-young, Choi Bo-min, and Park You-na were officially confirmed as the main cast members.

The series wrapped up filming in 2023.

== Original soundtrack ==
=== Part 1 ===
Released on October 16, 2025
No.	Title	Lyrics	Music	Artist	Length
1.	"HALLEY"	Taibian	Taibian; Dr.Ba$$(1)	Lucy	3:04
2.	"HALLEY" (Inst.)		Taibian; Dr.Ba$$(1)		3:04
Total length:					6:08

=== Part 2 ===
Released on October 29, 2025
No.	Title	Lyrics	Music	Artist	Length
1.	"My Type"	Cheeze	Kim Si-hyuk; Kim Beom-ju	Kim Si-hyuk; Kim Beom-ju	3:04
2.	"Chemistry"	Mckdaddy; Taesan	Mckdaddy; Taesan	Mckdaddy	2:53
3.	"G.O.A.T"	Scarlet Nguyen; PPPlayers (Eldorado)	Scarlet Nguyen; PPPlayers (Eldorado); Bitting Duck	H1-Key	2:58
4.	"Always You"	Kim Si-hyuk; Kim Beom-ju	Kim Si-hyuk; Kim Beom-ju	Kim Si-hyuk; Yeonkyung	3:39
5.	"My Type" (Inst.)		Kim Si-hyuk; Kim Beom-ju		3:04
6.	"Chemistry" (Inst.)		Mckdaddy; Taesan		2:53
7.	"G.O.A.T" (Inst.)		Scarlet Nguyen; PPPlayers (Eldorado); Bitting Duck		2:58
8.	"Always You" (Inst.)		Kim Si-hyuk; Kim Beom-ju		3:39
Total length:					25:11

=== Part 3 ===
Released on November 5, 2025
No.	Title	Lyrics	Music	Artist	Length
1.	"My Destiny is You"	HowL	HowL; Lee Hoon-min	Nam Woo-hyun	3:13
2.	"HALLEY - Female Version"	Taibian	Taibian; Dr.Ba$$(1)	ULUV	3:04
3.	"Then I Met You"	Kim Si-hyuk; Kim Beom-ju	Kim Si-hyuk; Kim Beom-ju	Haerian	3:36
4.	"My Destiny is You" (Inst.)		HowL; Lee Hoon-min		3:13
5.	"HALLEY - Female Version" (Inst.)		Taibian; Dr.Ba$$(1)		3:04
6.	"Then I Met You" (Inst.)		Kim Si-hyuk; Kim Beom-ju		3:36
Total length:					19:47

=== Part 4 ===
Released on November 12, 2025
No.	Title	Lyrics	Music	Artist	Length
1.	"Super Color"	GAON; HowL	GAON; HowL	Lee Chae-yeon; Minkyun	3:31
2.	"She is Flying"	HowL	Joseneve; Hwang Yong-ju	Kim Suyoung	3:22
3.	"Super Color" (Inst.)		GAON; HowL		3:31
4.	"She is Flying" (Inst.)		Joseneve; Hwang Yong-ju		3:22
Total length:					13:47

=== Part 5 ===
Released on November 19, 2025
No.	Title	Lyrics	Music	Artist	Length
1.	"Serendipity"	HowL	HowL	Blue.D	2:47
2.	"Stand Up"	Joseneve; GEUNN	Joseneve; GEUNN; Lee Dong-hoon; 돼지경찰	Solhyuk	3:24
3.	"Stay Here"	Kim Jae-jong; Jang Yoo-jun	Kim Jae-jong; Jang Yoo-jun	Jang Yoo-jun	2:32
4.	"Serendipity" (Inst.)		HowL		2:47
5.	"Stand Up" (Inst.)		Joseneve; GEUNN; Lee Dong-hoon; 돼지경찰		3:24
6.	"Stay HereStay Here" (Inst.)		Kim Si-hyuk; Kim Beom-ju		2:32
Total length:					17:27

=== Part 6 ===
Released on November 26, 2025
No.	Title	Lyrics	Music	Artist	Length
1.	"HALLEY - Acoustic Version"	Taibian	Taibian; Dr.Ba$$(1)	Park Ji-hu; Cho Jun-young; Choi Bo-min; Park You-na	3:27
2.	"HALLEY - Acoustic Version" (Inst.)		Taibian; Dr.Ba$$(1)		3:27
Total length:					6:54

== Release ==
The release of Spirit Fingers was initially planned for the second half of 2023, but it was postponed. It premiered on October 29, 2025, on TVING with the first 4 episodes. Two new episodes followed every Wednesday at 16:00 (KST), for a total of 12 episodes. It is also available for streaming on Viki in select regions.
