= Short (TV series) =

2018 South Korean television series

- Promotional poster
- Also known as: Love on Ice
- Hangul: 쇼트
- RR: Syoteu
- MR: Syot'ŭ
- Genre: Sports
- Created by: OCN; Olleh TV
- Written by: Kim Jung-Ae
- Directed by: Kim Young-min
- Starring: Kang Tae-oh; Yeo Hoe-hyun
- Country of origin: South Korea
- Original language: Korean
- No. of episodes: 4

Production
- Executive producers: Choi Hyuk-jin; Oh Young-seop
- Camera setup: Single-camera
- Running time: 50 minutes
- Production companies: Take 2 Media Group (Note: A subsidiary of GnG Production); Copus Korea

Original release
- Network: OCN
- Release: February 12 – February 20, 2018

Short (Korean: 쇼트) is a South Korean television series starring Kang Tae-oh, Yeo Hoe-hyun, and Kim Do-yeon. The series aired on OCN every Monday and Tuesday at 21:00 (KST).

== Synopsis ==
Two people who never fit in met on the cold ice! A special drama about a novice short track speed skater reaching the top of the world is a drama about a young boy who has grown up to become a member of the world's highest speed skating team.

== Cast ==
=== Main ===
- Kang Tae-oh as Kang Ho-young
- Yeo Hoe-hyun as Park Eun-ho

=== Supporting ===
- Kim Do-yeon as Yoo Ji-na
- Park So-eun as Maeng Man-hee
- Noh Jong-hyun as Maeng Man-bok
- Yoo Ha-joon as Son Seung-tae
- Park Joon-myun as Man-bok's mother
- Yoo Ha-bok as Park Hoon
- Kang Shin-koo as Kim Joong-bae
- Min Kyung-jin as Kang Ho-dong
- Yang Dae-hyuk as Skater
- Kim Wook as Trainer Oh

== Ratings ==
In this table, the blue numbers represent the lowest ratings and the red numbers represent the highest ratings.

Ep.	Original broadcast date	Average audience share
Ep.	Original broadcast date	TNmS
Ep.	Original broadcast date	Nationwide
1	February 12, 2018	0.3%
2	February 13, 2018	0.2%
3	February 19, 2018	0.1%
4	February 20, 2018	0.2%
Average		0.2%

- This drama airs on a cable channel/pay TV which normally has a relatively smaller audience compared to free-to-air TV/public broadcasters (KBS, SBS, MBC and EBS).
