= All That We Loved =

2023 South Korean television series

- Promotional poster
- Hangul: 우리가 사랑했던 모든 것
- Lit.: Everything We Loved
- RR: Uriga saranghaetdeon modeun geot
- MR: Uriga saranghaettŏn modŭn kŏt
- Genre: Teen drama; Comedy; Romance
- Written by: Kang Yoon
- Directed by: Kim Jin-sung
- Starring: Sehun; Cho Jun-young; Jang Yeo-bin
- Music by: Heo Sung-jin
- Country of origin: South Korea
- Original language: Korean
- No. of episodes: 8

Production
- Executive producers: Yang Si-kwon; Lee Han-sang; Kim Sang-eun; Yoo Gi-rim
- Producers: Ahn Il-hwan; Baek Hae-sun
- Cinematography: Lee Hyun-soo; Park Bo-geun
- Editor: Lee Hyun-ah
- Running time: 24–42 minutes
- Production company: Studio HIM

Original release
- Network: TVING
- Release: May 5 – May 26, 2023

All That We Loved (Korean: 우리가 사랑했던 모든 것) is a 2023 South Korean teen comedy romance television series written by Kang Yoon, directed by Kim Jin-sung, and starring Sehun, Cho Jun-young, and Jang Yeo-bin. It was released on TVING in South Korea from May 5 to 26, 2023, every Friday at 14:00 (KST). It is also available for streaming on Viki and Viu in selected regions.

== Synopsis ==
It tells about the friendship and love that everyone has thought about at least once in their childhood. A high-teen romance dealing with cellular memory, (Note: Cellular memory (CM) is a parallel hypothesis to Body memory (BM) positing that memories can be stored outside the brain in all cells.) it takes place when 18-year-old best friends Go Yoo and Go Joon-hee become similar to each other after a kidney transplant, and fall in love with a transfer student (Han So-yeon) at the same time.

== Cast ==
=== Main ===
- Sehun as Go Yoo

A basketball genius who donates a kidney to his best friend Joon-hee.
- Ki Eun-yoo as young Go Yoo

- Cho Jun-young as Go Joon-hee

Yoo's best friend who is weak and needs a kidney transplant, but experiences a 'cellular memory' after receiving it
- Kim Si-woo as young Go Joon-hee

- Jang Yeo-bin as Han So-yeon

A girl who both Yoo and Joon-hee fall in love with. She boasts a pretty appearance and a clear brain, but does not get close to people well.

=== Supporting ===
- Jung Hye-sun as Madam Mo

Joon-hee's biological grandmother and Yoo's adoptive grandmother.

- Lee Seung-joon as Yoo's father
- Park Eun-hye as Yoo's mother
- Jeon Yeong-in as Ahn Soon-tak

Yoo and Joon-Hee's classmate.

- Baek Min-hyun as adult Ahn Soon-tak

A second doctor at Go Psychiatric Center.

- Myung Jae-hwan as the homeroom teacher
- Kwon Hyuk-beom as Jeon Sang-gyu

A bully transfer senior student.

- Kwon Oh-geon as Go Joon-young

Joon-hee's older brother.

=== Special appearances ===
- Song Jae-rim as Doctor Go

A psychiatrist at Go Psychiatric Center.

- Jung Yoo-jin as adult Han So-yeon
- Woo Ji-won as a teacher

== Episodes ==
No.	Title	Directed by	Written by	Original release date
1	"First Love"	Kim Jin-sung	Kang Yoon	May 5, 2023
2	"What Drove Us Crazy"; Transliteration: "Urireul michige haneun geotdeul" (Korean: 우리를 미치게 하는 것들)	Kim Jin-sung	Kang Yoon	May 5, 2023
3	"Hope Brings Hope for Real"; Transliteration: "Huimang-i jinjja huimang-eul bureunda" (Korean: 희망이 진찌 희망을 부른다)	Kim Jin-sung	Kang Yoon	May 12, 2023
4	"Liking Someone With All Your Strength"; Transliteration: "Jeonryeok-eul dahae joh-ahaneun il" (Korean: 전력을 다해 좋아하는)	Kim Jin-sung	Kang Yoon	May 12, 2023
5	"The Secret That Was Only Kept from You"; Transliteration: "Neoman mollattdeon bimil" (Korean: 너만 몰랐던 비밀)	Kim Jin-sung	Kang Yoon	May 19, 2023
6	"Sadness Brings About a Strong Will"; Transliteration: "Seulpeum-eun ganghan euijireul bulleo-onda" (Korean: 슬픔은 강한 의지를 불러은다)	Kim Jin-sung	Kang Yoon	May 19, 2023
7	"If We Don't Let Go of Our Hands Even When We Are in Conflict"; Transliteration: "Eogeutnaneun sun-eul nohji anhneundamyeon" (Korean: 어긋나는 순을 놓지 않는다면)	Kim Jin-sung	Kang Yoon	May 26, 2023
8	"There Is No End to Friendship"; Transliteration: "Ujeong-e ending-eun eobda" (Korean: 우정에 엔딩은 없다)	Kim Jin-sung	Kang Yoon	May 26, 2023

== Production ==
=== Development and filming ===
Developed under the working title Love, Do It (Korean: 시랑, 하라고; RR: Sarang, harago), All That We Loved was written by Kang Yoon, and directed by Kim Jin-sung, who worked on MBC TV hit dramas such as Queen Seondeok and Gu Family Book. Filming began in April 2022.

Studio HIM managed the production of the series.

=== Casting ===
In March 2022, media reported that Sehun, Jang Yeo-bin, and Cho Jun-young were cast to play the lead characters for the series, and they were officially confirmed on July 27, 2022.

== Release ==
All That We Loved was supposed to be released in 2022, but months later it was changed to 2023. TVING then confirmed the release date which unveiled on May 5, 2023, releasing two episodes every Friday at 14:00 (KST), with a total of eight episodes. It is also available to stream on Viki and Viu in selected regions.
