= Baek Ji-young =

South Korean singer (born 1976)

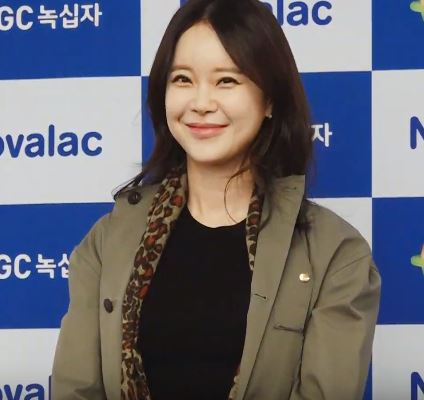
- Baek in 2019
- Born: March 25, 1976 (age 50); Seoul, South Korea
- Occupation: Singer
- Years active: 1999–present
- Spouse: Jung Suk-won (m. 2013)
- Children: 1
- Musical career
- Genres: K-pop; R&B
- Label: Music Works

Korean name
- Hangul: 백지영
- Hanja: 白智榮
- RR: Baek Jiyeong
- MR: Paek Chiyŏng

Baek Ji-young (Korean: 백지영; born March 25, 1976), sometimes anglicized as Baek Z Young, is a South Korean singer. She made her debut in 1999, with the release of her album Sorrow. Over her career she has released eight studio albums and won awards for "Best Female Artist" and "Best OST" at the Mnet Asian Music Awards.

== Career ==
Baek began her music career in 1999, entering the South Korean dance scene with her first album Sorrow. The first single, "선택" (Choice), was one of the first Korean pop songs to feature Latin beats. The single charted well, and Baek quickly followed her debut with a second album, Rouge, which came out in April 2000 and sold 360,000 copies.

Two years after the release of Tres, Baek released her fourth album Smile in September 2003, which placed 46th for the year. In March 2006, Baek released her fifth album, Smile Again. "사랑 안해" (I Won't Love), her first single from the album, was a ballad, unlike the rest of her Latin-style singles. Although this was a significant change, the song reached the top spot on certain performance show charts. This change was not permanent, as there were many Latin/dance tracks on the album, including single "Ez Do Dance." She performed this single until the end of summer 2006, at which point she finished promotional activities for the album. In November 2006, Baek won Best Female Solo Singer at the MKMF Awards and was nominated for the Overseas Viewer Award.

On September 7, 2007, Baek's sixth album, The Sixth Miracle, was released, with the lead single "사랑 하나면 돼" (I Only Need One Love). She won an award for the album at the Seoul Music Awards in January 2008.

Fearing she would lose her voice, Baek underwent vocal cord surgery to remove a cyst in February 2008.

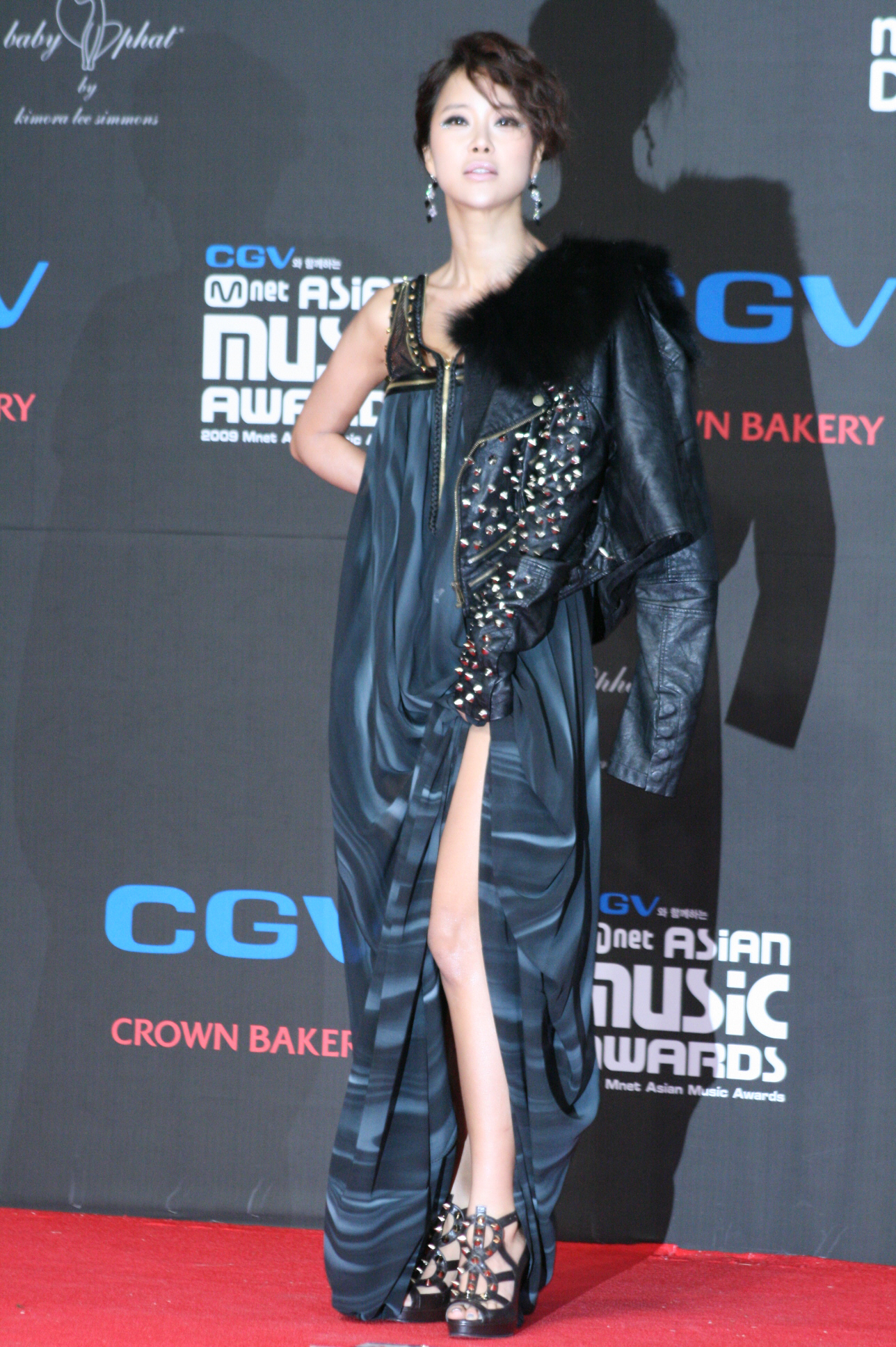
Baek at the 2009 Mnet Asian Music Awards

After recuperating from her surgery, Baek returned with her seventh album, Sensibility, released on November 14, 2008. It was reported that she would come back with a dance single to showcase her strengthened voice, but instead came back with "총 맞은 것처럼" (Like Being Hit by a Bullet), a mid-tempo ballad. The single hit No. 1 on various online music sites and hit No. 1 on KBS's music program Music Bank.

On August 9, 2009, Baek announced a collaboration with 2PM member Taecyeon for the title track of her mini-album EGO called "내 귀에 캔디" (My Ear Candy). Unlike her previous songs, My Ear Candy is a pop-dance track that includes techno beats. They first performed the song on Kim Jung-eun's Chocolate, although the episode did not air until a week later after her official comeback on Show! Music Core. EGO was released on August 14, 2009. On November 21, 2009, Baek won Best Female Solo Artist at Mnet Asian Music Awards.

She collaborated with Mighty Mouth for their comeback single "사랑이 올까요" (Will Love Come), released on March 12, 2010, along with a music video. This is her second collaboration with the group; she was previously featured on their mini-album Love Class in the track Miss U, released on August 6, 2009. Her single Over Time topped various music charts on the day of its release on July 1, 2010, and Baek's greatest-hits album Timeless: The Best also sold well.

With the success of her eighth album Pitta in 2011, music industry critics found it remarkable for a female singer in her mid-30s to succeed in an industry dominated by teen bands.

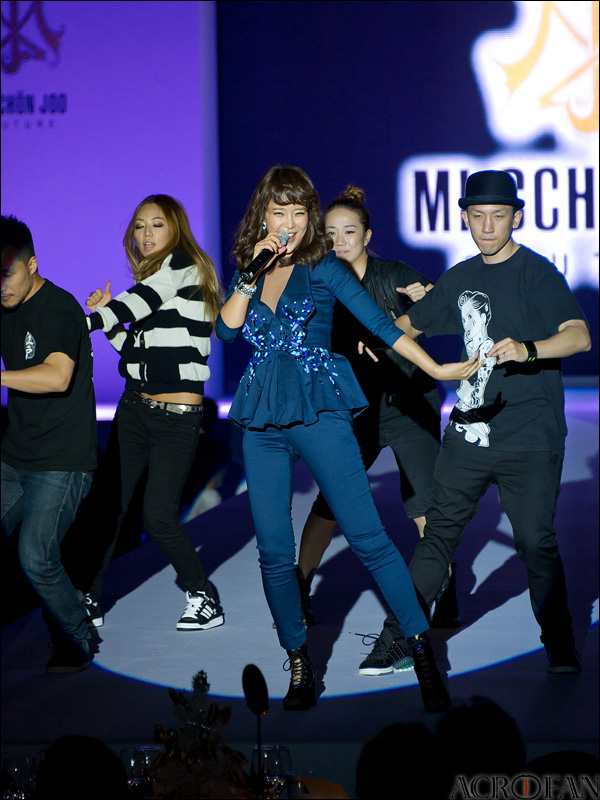
Baek performing in 2011

Baek has also participated in numerous soundtracks for TV dramas, including Don't Forget for IRIS, Love Is Not a Crime for Ja Myung Go, Love and Love for Arang and the Magistrate, and Spring Rain for Gu Family Book. The most famous thus far has been That Woman from Secret Garden, which won Outstanding Korean Drama OST at the 2011 Seoul International Drama Awards. Baek said, "I love to participate in producing music for soaps if I like the female lead after reading the script. It's a thrill to hear my song played during melodramatic moments in soaps." She later released an album in 2013 titled Flash Back, a collection of the television drama soundtracks she recorded.

In 2012, Baek announced that she was releasing her first dance album in three years. She also became a judge/coach on The Voice of Korea, the local version of reality singing competition The Voice. On May 7, she released a ballad from the mini-album entitled Voice, featuring Gary from Leessang. On the 17th, her Good Boy mini-album was released, including the dance title track of the same name featuring Yong Jun-hyung of B2ST.

On February 16, 2013, Baek held her first solo concert in seven years at the Jamsil Gymnasium in Seoul, followed by a nationwide tour in March. She performed for the first time in Japan at a sold-out concert in May.

On November 1, 2022, Baek's agency announced the cancellation of Cheongju's first local concert, Baek Ji-young's national concert 'GO BAEK (Confession)', which was scheduled to be held on November 5 due to the aftermath Seoul Halloween crowd crush event.

== Personal life ==
=== Marriage and family ===
Baek married actor Jung Suk-won on June 2, 2013, at the Sheraton Grande Walkerhill. The couple began dating in 2011, and were expecting their first child. However, on June 27, 2013, it was confirmed that Baek had suffered a miscarriage, four months into her pregnancy. On May 22, 2017, Baek gave birth to the couple's first child, a daughter named Jung Ha-im.

=== Health ===
In 2009, after suffering from a high fever and dizziness from the flu and hypotension, Baek stopped a dinner concert midway. After singing her fifth song, she told the audience, "I am very sorry for being on stage despite being sick. I won't be able to continue my performance." Experts speculated that refunds cost Baek and her agency losses of nearly ₩200 million (about US$180,000).

== Controversies ==
In 2000, a sex tape featuring Baek and her manager at the time, Kim Shi-won (alias Kim Seok-jin), was leaked onto the internet. The video had been recorded secretly in a hotel room without Baek's knowledge, and was later used to threaten Baek when she attempted to change her contracted manager at the peak of her career. The former manager, who fled to the U.S., is currently serving time in a Los Angeles jail for charges of sex with a minor, which he also recorded on video. The scandal nearly ruined Baek's career, leading to a five-year slump to her reputation from which she only arose in 2006.

She and a friend, singer Yuri, set up the successful online shopping business IamYuri Mall. Baek withdrew from associating with the brand in 2012 after the Fair Trade Commission fined several celebrity-run online shopping malls for posting fake user reviews.

Baek filed suit against a local plastic surgery clinic that had used her photo for online advertising without her permission. On June 24, 2013, the Seoul Central District Court found the clinic guilty of infringing on her rights for profit and awarded Baek damages of ₩5 million (US$4,320).

== Discography ==
Studio albums

- Sorrow (1999)
- Rouge (2000)
- Tres (2001)
- Smile (2003)
- Smile Again (2006)
- The Sixth Miracle (2007)
- Sensibility (2008)
- Pitta (2011)

== Filmography ==
=== Television series ===
| Year | Title | Role | Notes | Ref. |
|---|---|---|---|---|
| 2010 | Secret Garden | | Cameo (Episode 13) | |

=== Television shows ===
| Year | Title | Role | Notes | Ref. |
|---|---|---|---|---|
| 2020 | Miss Back | Main Mentor | | |
| 2021–2022 | Liberation Town | Main Cast | Episode 8–34 | |
| 2021 | Tomorrow's National Singer | judge | | |
| 2021 | Global Donation Show W | Host | | |
| 2022 | Global Donation Show W (Double-U) | Host | | |
| 2022 | Singforest 2 | Host | | |
| 2022 | Avatar Singer | Judge | | |
| 2023 | Sing Again | Judge | Season 3 | |

== Ambassadorship ==
- Ambassador for Rare Diseases.

== Awards and nominations ==
Year presented, name of the award ceremony, award category, nominated work and the result of the nomination
| Year | Award | Category | Nominated work | Result | Ref. |
|---|---|---|---|---|---|
| 1999 | Mnet Video Music Awards | Best New Solo Artist | "Choice" (선택) | Nominated | |
| 2000 | MBC Top 10 Singers Song Festival | Top 10 Artist Award | | Won | |
| 2000 | Mnet Music Video Festival | Best Female Artist | "Sad Salsa" | Nominated | |
| 2003 | KMTV Korean Music Awards | Dance Award | | Won | |
| 2006 | Golden Disc Awards | Popularity Award | "I Won't Love" (사랑 안 해) | Won | |
| 2006 | Mnet Km Music Festival | Best Female Artist | "I Won't Love" (사랑 안 해) | Won | |
| 2006 | Mnet Km Music Festival | Artist of the Year | "I Won't Love" (사랑 안 해) | Nominated | |
| 2006 | Mnet Km Music Festival | Song of the Year | "I Won't Love" (사랑 안 해) | Nominated | |
| 2006 | Mnet Km Music Festival | Best Ballad Performance | "I Won't Love" (사랑 안 해) | Nominated | |
| 2006 | SBS Gayo Daejeon | Main Award (Bonsang) | | Won | |
| 2006 | Seoul Music Awards | Main Award (Bonsang) | | Won | |
| 2007 | Korean Music Awards | Song of the Year | "I Won't Love" (사랑 안 해) | Nominated | |
| 2007 | Korean Music Awards | Musician of the Year (Female) | "I Won't Love" (사랑 안 해) | Nominated | |
| 2007 | Korean Music Awards | Best Pop Song | "I Won't Love" (사랑 안 해) | Nominated | |
| 2007 | Mnet Km Music Festival | Best Female Artist | "I Only Need One Love" (사랑 하나면 돼) | Nominated | |
| 2008 | Cyworld Digital Music Awards | Song of the Month (December) | "Like Being Hit By a Bullet" (총맞은 것처럼) | Won | |
| 2009 | Golden Disc Awards | Digital Song Bonsang | "Like Being Hit By a Bullet" (총맞은 것처럼) | Won | |
| 2009 | Mnet Asian Music Awards | Best Female Artist | "Like Being Hit By a Bullet" (총맞은 것처럼) | Won | |
| 2009 | Mnet Asian Music Awards | Best Ballad/R&B Performance | "Like Being Hit By a Bullet" (총맞은 것처럼) | Nominated | |
| 2009 | Mnet Asian Music Awards | Best Original Soundtrack | "Don't Forget" (잊지 말아요) (from Iris) | Nominated | |
| 2009 | Seoul Music Awards | Main Award (Bonsang) | | Won | |
| 2009 | Seoul Music Awards | YTN Star Award | | Won | |
| 2010 | Korean Music Awards | Female Musician of the Year Netizen Vote | | Won | |
| 2010 | Korean Music Awards | Best Pop Song | "Like Being Hit By a Bullet" (총맞은 것처럼) | Nominated | |
| 2010 | Seoul Music Awards | Main Award (Bonsang) | "My Ear's Candy" (내귀에 캔디) | Won | |
| 2011 | Melon Music Awards | MBC Music Star Award | | Won | |
| 2011 | Mnet Asian Music Awards | Best Female Artist | "Ordinary" (보통) | Won | |
| 2011 | Mnet Asian Music Awards | Best Original Soundtrack | "That Woman" (그 여자) (from Secret Garden) | Won | |
| 2012 | Seoul Music Awards | Original Soundtrack Award | "That Woman" (그 여자) (from Secret Garden) | Won | |
| 2012 | Mnet Asian Music Awards | Best Female Artist | "Voice (목소리) | Nominated | |
| 2012 | Mnet Asian Music Awards | Best Vocal Performance – Solo | "Voice (목소리) | Nominated | |
| 2013 | Mnet Asian Music Awards | Best Female Artist | "Hate" (싫다) | Nominated | |
| 2014 | Mnet Asian Music Awards | Best Vocal Performance – Female | "Fervor" (불꽃) | Nominated | |
| 2016 | MBC Entertainment Awards | MC Award | Duet Song Festival | Won | |
| 2021 | Proud Baekje Artist Award | Outstanding Alumni | —N/a | Won | |

=== Listicles ===
Name of publisher, year listed, name of listicle, and placement
| Publisher | Year | Listicle | Placement | Ref. |
|---|---|---|---|---|
| Forbes | 2014 | Korea Power Celebrity 40 | 36th | |

Awards and achievements
| Preceded by BoA | 8th Mnet Asian Music Awards – Best Female Artist; 2006 | Succeeded by Ivy |
| Preceded by Lee Hyori | 11th Mnet Asian Music Awards – Best Female Artist; 2009 | Succeeded by BoA |
| Preceded by BoA | 13th Mnet Asian Music Awards – Best Female Artist; 2011 | Succeeded by IU |
