= The Music Works =

South Korean entertainment company

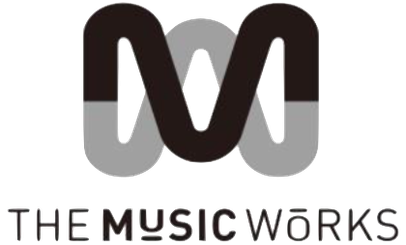
- Industry: Entertainment
- Genre: K-pop; R&B; Folk; Ballad
- Founded: December 24, 2012
- Founders: Oh Won-chul (Philip Oh)
- Headquarters: Seoul, South Korea
- Website: http://www.themusicworks.co.kr/

The Music Works (Korean: 뮤직웍스; simply known as Music Works) is a South Korean entertainment company established in 2012 by Oh Won-chul (Philip Oh) joint-ventures with CJ E&M Music.

The label currently manages several artists, namely GilguBonggu (GB9), and U Sung-eun. It was formerly home to artists such as Baek Ji-young, Kim So-hee, Myteen, Minzy and B.O.Y.

== Artists ==
=== Artists ===
Soloists

- U Sung-eun
- Kissxs
- Clo

== Former artists/actors ==
- Baek Ji-young (2014–2019)
- Kim So-hee (2016–2019)
- Myteen (2016–2019)
  - Chunjin (2016–2019)
  - Eunsu (2016–2019)
  - Hanseul (2016–2019)
- Lee Tae-vin (2016–2019)
- Shin Junseop (2016–2020)
- Minzy (2016–2020)
- B.O.Y (2019–2021)
  - Song Yuvin (2016–2021)
  - Kim Kookheon (2016–2021)
- GB9 (2012–2021)
