= Bibi (singer) =

South Korean singer and actress (born 1998)

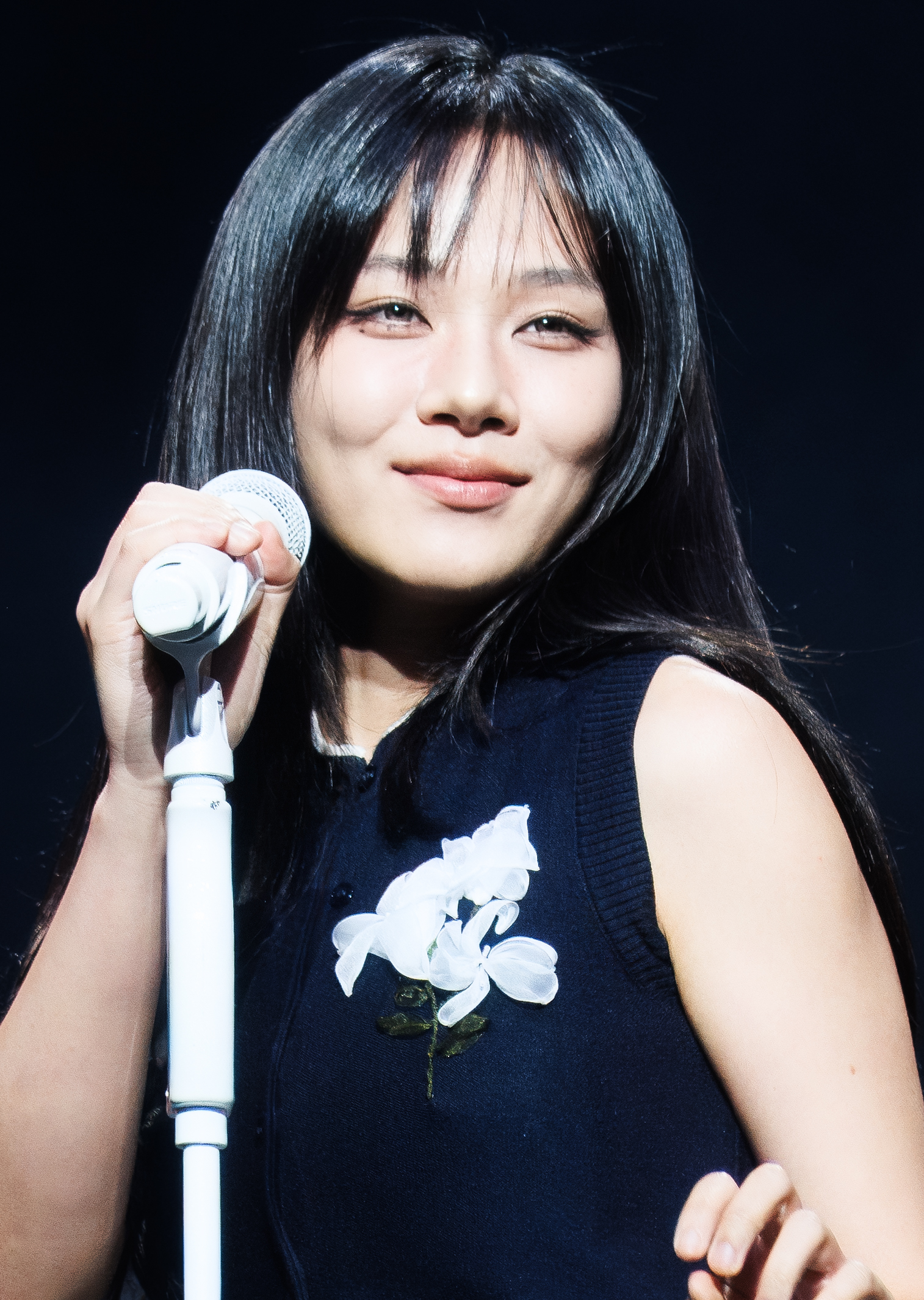
- Bibi in June 2025
- Born: Kim Hyeong-seo; September 27, 1998 (age 28); Ulsan, South Korea
- Occupations: Singer; rapper; songwriter; actress
- Relatives: Kim Na-kyoung (sister)
- Musical career
- Genre: R&B
- Years active: 2017–present
- Labels: Feel Ghood Music; 88rising

Korean name
- Hangul: 김형서
- RR: Gim Hyeongseo
- MR: Kim Hyŏngsŏ

Stage name
- Hangul: 비비
- RR: Bibi
- MR: Pibi

Signature
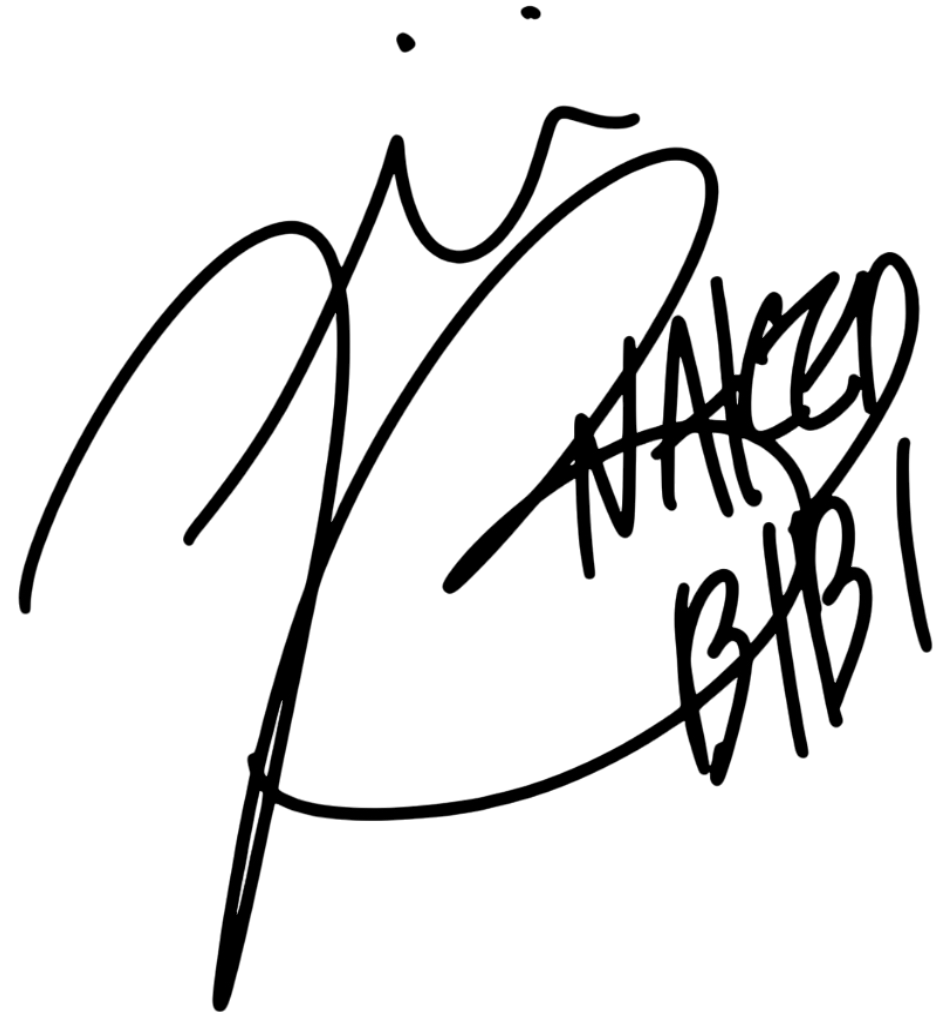

Kim Hyeong-seo (Korean: 김형서, born September 27, 1998), known professionally as Bibi (비비), is a South Korean singer, rapper, songwriter, and actress. In 2018, she appeared on the SBS program The Fan and was the runner-up of the show. In 2022, she released her first studio album Lowlife Princess: Noir. As an actress, Bibi is well-known for her lead roles in the film Hopeless (2023) and television series such as The Worst of Evil (2023), The Fiery Priest (2024) and Gangnam B-Side (2024).

== Early life ==
Kim Hyeong-seo was born in Ulsan and spent her teenage years in Changwon. She felt awkward talking to people, so she began to write lyrics about not being able to say what she wanted to say when she was 15.

Bibi has a younger sister, Kim Na-kyoung, who debuted with the girl group TripleS through one of its sub-units Acid Angel from Asia on October 28, 2022.

== Career ==
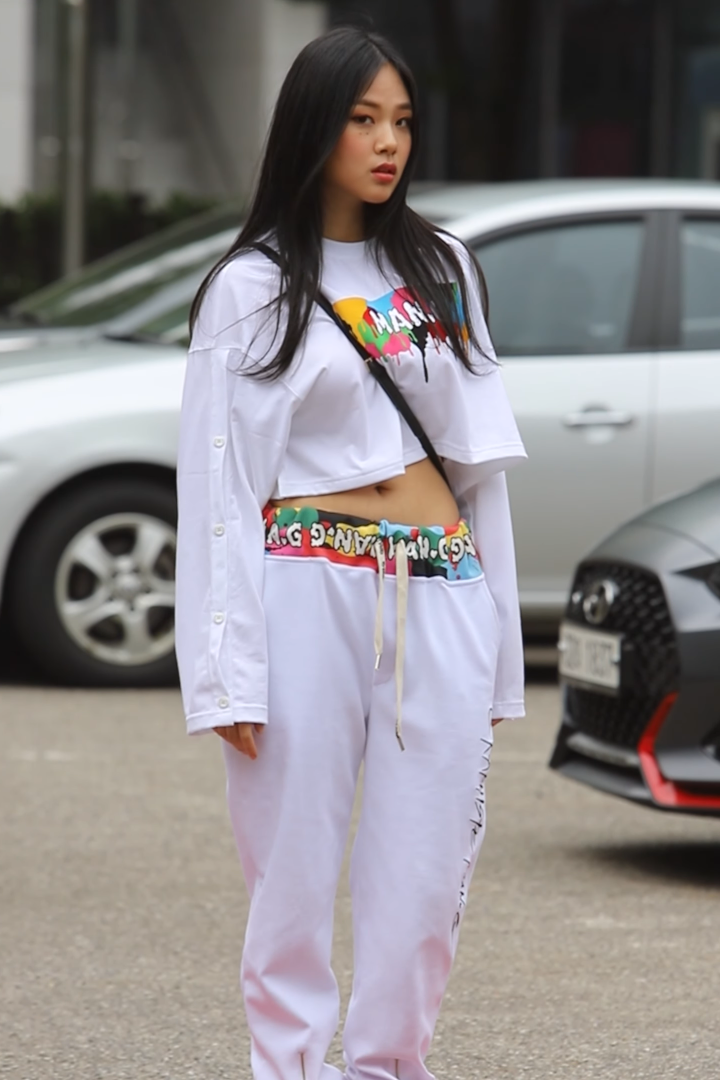
Bibi in 2019

In 2017, Bibi signed with Feel Ghood Music after Yoon Mi-rae discovered her self-produced songs on SoundCloud. In 2018, Bibi appeared as a contestant in SBS competition show The Fan, where she eventually finished in second place. She made her official debut with the single "Binu" on May 15, 2019.

In April 2021, Bibi released her second extended play Life is a Bi.... In October, she released a collaboration single "The Weekend" with 88rising. It later peaked at 29 on the Mediabase Top 40 chart, making Bibi the first Korean female soloist to do so. In December, she signed a global promotion deal with 88rising. On November 18, 2022, she released her first studio album Lowlife Princess: Noir.

On February 13, 2024, Bibi released a single titled "Bam Yang Gang". It peaked at number 1 on the Circle Digital Chart, making it her first song ever to do so. Following the single's release and instant success due to a viral singing challenge of users singing the song while eating bamyanggaeng (chestnut jelly) boosted by popular singers like Lee Hyori, sales of it also increased by 40% in South Korea.

On March 13, 2025, Feel Ghood Music announced that Bibi would be embarking on her first world tour, Eve, kicking off in Seoul from May 16 to 18 at the Olympic Hall. Bibi released her second studio album Eve: Romance on May 14.

=== Acting ===
In 2023, Bibi appeared in Hopeless and was nominated for Best New Actress at the Blue Dragon Film Awards. In 2024, she won Best New Actress – Film at the Baeksang Arts Awards for her role.

== Philanthropy ==
Bibi donated 40 million won to help the victims of the 2023 Turkey–Syria earthquake, alongside Tiger JK and Yoon Mi-rae.

== Discography ==
=== Studio albums ===
List of studio albums, showing selected details, selected chart positions, and sales figures
Title	Details	Peak chart positions	Sales
Title	Details	KOR	Sales
Lowlife Princess: Noir	Released: November 18, 2022; Label: Feel Ghood Music, Kakao Entertainment, 88rising; Formats: CD, digital download, streaming	7	KOR: 18,914
Eve: Romance	Released: May 14, 2025; Label: Feel Ghood Music, Kakao Entertainment, 88rising; Formats: CD, digital download, streaming; Track listing: 1. "Apocalypse" (종말의 사과나무); 2. "Hongdae R&B" (홍대 R&B); 3. "Meat" (몸); 4. "Pygma Girl"; 5. "Scott and Zelda" (책방오빠 문학소녀); 6. "Sugar Rush"; 7. "Derre" (데레); 8. "Burn It" (feat. Dean); 9. "Real Man"; 10. "Midnight Cruise" (왔다갔는교); 11. "Bam Yang Gang" (밤양갱); 12. "Hangang Gongwon" (한강공원); 13. "Bluebird" (행복에게); 14. "Winter (Unreleased)" (겨울 (미발매))	16	KOR: 15,486

=== Extended plays ===
List of extended plays, showing selected details, selected chart positions, and sales figures
Title	Details	Peak chart positions	Sales
Title	Details	KOR	Sales
The Manual for People Who Want to Love (사랑하는 사람들을 위한 지침서)	Released: June 12, 2019; Label: Feel Ghood Music, The Five Cultural Industrial Company, Kakao M; Formats: Digital download; Track listing: 1. "Nabi" (나비); 2. "Give More Care Less"; 3. "Pretty Ting" (feat. Kim Seung-min); 4. "Fedexx Girl" (feat. Changmo)	—	—N/a
Life is a Bi... (인생은 나쁜X)	Released: April 28, 2021; Label: Feel Ghood Music, The Five Cultural Industrial Company, Kakao Entertainment; Formats: CD, digital download, streaming	31	KOR: 4,257
"—" denotes a recording that did not chart or was not released in that territory

=== Singles ===
==== As lead artist ====
List of singles as lead artist, showing year released, selected chart positions, and name of the album
Title	Year	Peak chart positions		Album
Title	Year	KOR	WW	Album
"Rebirth" (환생)	2019	—	—	The Fan 1 Round Part 1
"Letter" (편지)	2019	—	—	The Fan 3 Round Part 2
"Fly With Me"	2019	—	—	The Fan 4 Round Part 2
"Three W's and One H" (언제 어디서 무엇을 어떻게)	2019	—	—	The Fan Top 3
"Hangang" (한강)	2019	—	—	The Fan Top 2
"Binu" (비누)	2019	—	—	Non-album single
"Nabi" (나비)	2019	—	—	The Manual for People Who Want to Love
"Step?" (자국)	2019	—	—	Non-album single
"Restless" (신경쓰여)	2020	—	—	Listen 035
"I'm Good at Goodbyes" (안녕히)	2020	—	—	Non-album singles
"Kazino" (사장님 도박은 재미로 하셔야 합니다)	2020	—	—	Non-album singles
"She Got It" (쉬가릿)	2020	—	—	Dingo X Bibi
"Eat My Love" (사랑의 묘약)	2021	175	—	Non-album single
"Bad Sad and Mad"	2021	— (Note: "Bad Sad and Mad" did not enter the Gaon Digital Chart, but debuted and peaked at number 86 on the Gaon Download Chart.)	—	Life Is a Bi...
"Life Is a Bi..." (인생은 나쁜X)	2021	— (Note: "Life Is a Bi..." did not enter the Gaon Digital Chart, but debuted and peaked at number 61 on the Gaon Download Chart.)	—	Life Is a Bi...
"Why Y" (feat. Tiger JK)	2021	— (Note: "Why Y" did not enter the Gaon Digital Chart, but debuted and peaked at number 71 on the Gaon Download Chart.)	—	Non-album singles
"Pado"	2021	— (Note: "Pado" did not enter the Gaon Digital Chart, but debuted and peaked at number 78 on the Gaon Download Chart.)	—	Non-album singles
"The Weekend"	2021	— (Note: "The Weekend" did not enter the Circle Digital Chart, but debuted and peaked at number 192 on the Circle Download Chart.)	—	Non-album singles
"Animal Farm" (가면무도회)	2022	199	—	Lowlife Princess: Noir
"Sweet Sorrow of Mother" (불륜)	2022	151	—	Lowlife Princess: Noir
"Blade" (철학보다 무서운건 비비의 총알)	2022	— (Note: "Blade" did not enter the Circle Digital Chart, but peaked at number 110 on the Circle Download Chart.)	—	Lowlife Princess: Noir
"Bibi Vengeance" (나쁜X)	2022	130	—	Lowlife Princess: Noir
"Jotto" (조또)	2022	— (Note: "Jotto" did not enter the Circle Digital Chart, but peaked at number 107 on the Circle Download Chart.)	—	Lowlife Princess: Noir
"I Am" (안녕하세오 샴푸애요)	2023	— (Note: "I Am" did not enter the Circle Digital Chart, but peaked at number 104 on the Circle Download Chart.)	—	Non-album single
"Hongdae R&B" (홍대 R&B)	2023	— (Note: "Hongdae R&B" did not enter the Circle Digital Chart, but peaked at number 67 on the Circle Download Chart.)	—	Eve: Romance
"Bam Yang Gang" (밤양갱)	2024	1	79	Eve: Romance
"Sugar Rush"	2024	— (Note: "Sugar Rush" did not enter the Circle Digital Chart, but peaked at number 50 on the Circle Download Chart.)	—	Eve: Romance
"Derre" (데레)	2024	— (Note: "Derre" did not enter the Circle Digital Chart, but peaked at number 46 on the Circle Download Chart.)	—	Eve: Romance
"Burn It" (feat. Dean)	2024	— (Note: "Burn It" did not enter the Circle Digital Chart, but peaked at number 81 on the Circle Download Chart.)	—	Eve: Romance
"Bluebird" (행복에게)	2025	— (Note: "Bluebird" did not enter the Circle Digital Chart, but peaked at number 26 on the Circle Download Chart.)	—	Eve: Romance
"Winter (Unreleased)" (겨울 (미발매))	2025	— (Note: "Winter (Unreleased)" did not enter the Circle Digital Chart, but peaked at number 63 on the Circle Download Chart.)	—	Eve: Romance
"Apocalypse" (종말의 사과나무)	2025	— (Note: "Apocalypse" did not enter the Circle Digital Chart, but peaked at number 37 on the Circle Download Chart.)	—	Eve: Romance
"Scott and Zelda" (책방오빠 문학소녀)	2025	— (Note: "Scott and Zelda" did not enter the Circle Digital Chart, but peaked at number 54 on the Circle Download Chart.)	—	Eve: Romance
"Bumpa"	2026	87	—	Non-album single
"—" denotes a recording that did not chart or was not released in that territory

==== As featured artist ====
List of singles as featured artist, showing year released, selected chart positions, and name of the album
Title	Year	Peak chart positions	Album
Title	Year	KOR	Album
"Payback" (Black Nine feat. Bibi)	2017	—	American Assassin
"Ghood Family" (Tiger JK, Yoon Mi-rae feat. Bizzy, Black Nine, Bibi, Mrshll)	2017	—	Non-album single
"Ooh Ah" (우아) (Bizzy feat. Bibi)	2018	—	Non-album single
"Eleven" (twlv feat. Bibi)	2019	—	Blueline
"Hammock" (해먹) (Crucial Star feat. Bibi)	2019	—	Non-album singles
"Fever" (Park Jin-young feat. Superbee, Bibi)	2019	30	Non-album singles
"Te Quiero" (twlv feat. Bibi)	2020	—	K.I.S.S
"Love & Hate" (웬수) (Zico feat. Bibi)	2020	151	Random Box
"Everything" (Way Ched feat. Changmo, Coogie, Ash Island, Bibi)	2020	—	Non-album single
"Mukkbang! Remix" (Lil Cherry, GOLDBUUDA feat. Jay Park, Bibi, Dumbfoundead)	2020	—	Chef Talk
"Canoe" (카누) (QM feat. BIBI)	2020	—	Money Breath
"Hanryang" (한량) (Prod. DinDin) (Kim Hee-chul, Min Kyung-hoon feat. Bibi)	2020	190	Non-album single
"Meu Tempo" (Heo Won-hyuk feat. Bibi, Simon Dominic)	2021	—	High School Rapper 4
"Is This Bad B****** Number?" (Jeon So-yeon feat. Bibi, Lee Young-ji)	2021	— (Note: "Is This Bad B****** Number?" did not enter the Gaon Digital Chart, but debuted and peaked at number 45 on Gaon Download Chart.)	Windy
"Second" (Hyo feat. Bibi)	2021	176	Deep
"Galipette" (Lolo Zouaï feat. Bibi)	2021	—	Non-album singles
"Picky Baby" (Owell Mood feat. Bibi)	2021	—	Non-album singles
"Smiley" (Yena feat. Bibi)	2022	8	Smiley
"Crazy Like You" (Chungha feat. Bibi)	2022	—	Bare & Rare
"Eve, Psyche & the Bluebeard's Wife" (Le Sserafim feat. Bibi, Camo, Mirani)	2023	—	Non-album single
"Follow Your Steps" (춤) (10cm feat. Bibi)	2025	195	5.0
"—" denotes a recording that did not chart or was not released in that territory

==== Collaborations ====
List of collaboration singles, showing year released, selected chart positions, and name of the album
Title	Year	Peak chart positions		Album
Title	Year	KOR	US Pop	Album
"Cute Lil Thug" (니 마음을 훔치는 도둑) (with Yoon Mi-rae)	2019	—	—	The Fan Top 3
"This Is Pengsoo" (펭수로 하겠습니다) (with Pengsoo, Tiger JK, Bizzy)	2020	54	—	Billboard Project Vol. 1
"Automatic" (with Chancellor, Babylon, twlv, MOON, Jiselle)	2020	—	—	Non-album single
"She Said" (with Crush)	2020	108	—	with HER
"Automatic Remix" (Note: With Chancellor, Jay Park, Lee Hi, Jamie, MOON, Bumkey, Samuel Seo, Suran, Babylon, Hoody, Sumin, MRSHLL, Ann One, ELO, twlv, oceanfromtheblue, Jiselle, SOLE, THAMA, Kysh, Jinbo, jerd, SooVi, B.E.D., Xydo, Owell Mood and NONE)	2020	—	—	Non-album singles
"Code Clear" (격리해제) (Note: With YDG, Simon Dominic, Loco, Bewhy, Punchnello, Puff Daehee, Uneducated Kid, Bill Stax, Tiger JK, Bizzy, Woo Won-jae, Tommy Strate, Boi B, Geegooin, Hangzoo, Ja Mezz, Kim Nongmil, MOON, Gaeko, Coogie, Blase, Sway D, Ahn Byung-woong, QM, Nucksal, twlv, Basick, Choiza, Zizo, Leellamarz, Verbal Jint, Khundi Panda, Son Simba, Lil Tachi, Keem Hyo Eun, Kim Seung-min, OLNL, Mckdaddy, Swervy, BIG Naughty, Layone, Owell Mood, jerd, Don Mills, Lee Young-ji, Chin, CK, Louie, Los, Rohann, Khakii, Dbo, Wonstein, Trade L, Don Malik, BIGONE, Ski Dash, WHATIS AUTUMN, THAMA, Heo Sung-hyun and Jo Gwang-il)	2021	—	—	Non-album singles
"The Weekend (Remix)" (with 347aidan)	2021	—	33	Non-album singles
"Best Lover" (with 88rising)	2022	—	—	Non-album singles
"Law" (Prod. Czaer) (with Yoon Mi-rae)	2022	14	—	Street Man Fighter Original Vol.3
"Amigos" (with Becky G)	2023	—	—	Non-album singles
"Feeling Lucky" (with Jackson Wang)	2024	—	39	Non-album singles
"—" denotes a recording that did not chart or was not released in that territory

==== Soundtrack appearances ====
List of soundtrack singles, showing year released, selected chart positions, and name of the album
Title	Year	Peak chart positions		Album
Title	Year	KOR	KOR Hot	Album
"Tonight" (오늘 밤은 말야) (with Jinho of Pentagon)	2020	—	—	Big Picture House OST Part 3
"Naan" (난)	2020	—	—	Live On OST Part 2
"Timeless"	2021	—	—	Beyond Evil OST Part 2
"Stay with Me" (내 곁에 있어줘요)	2021	—	—	Oh My Ladylord OST Part 5
"Never Gonna Come Down" (with Mark Tuan)	2021	—	—	Shang-Chi and the Legend of the Ten Rings OST
"Maybe If" (우리가 헤어져야 했던 이유)	2021	21	—	Our Beloved Summer OST Part 2
"Very, Slowly" (아주, 천천히)	2022	48	89	Twenty-Five Twenty-One OST Part 3
"My Pace"	2026	— (Note: "My Pace" did not enter the Circle Digital Chart, but peaked at number 35 on the Circle Download Chart.)	—	Perfect Crown OST Part 1
"—" denotes a recording that did not chart or was not released in that territory

== Filmography ==
=== Film ===
Key
†	Denotes films that have not yet been released

Year	Title	Role	Notes	Ref.
2021	Whispering Corridors 6: The Humming	Jae-yeon		
2023	Phantom	A new secretary	Cameo	
2023	Hopeless	Ha-yan		
2027	The Sword: Rebirth of the Red Wolf †	Injeong		

=== Television series ===
Year	Title	Role	Notes	Ref.
2024	The Fiery Priest	Ku Ja-young	Season 2	

=== Web series ===
Year	Title	Role	Ref.
2023	The Worst of Evil	Lee Hae-ryeon	
2024	Gangnam B-Side	Kim Jae-hee	

=== Television shows ===
Year	Title	Role	Notes	Ref.
2018–2019	The Fan	Contestant	Top 2	
2026	The Last Humanity	Cast member		
2026	Sixth Sense: B-side	Cast member		

=== Web shows ===
Year	Title	Role	Notes	Ref.
2021–2022	Girls High Mystery Class	Cast member	Season 1-2	
2022	Witch Hunt 2022	Host		

== Concerts and tours ==
- Can You Come? (2022)
- Eve World Tour (2025)

=== Eve World Tour (2025) ===
Date	City	Country	Venue	Ref.
May 16, 2025	Seoul	South Korea	Olympic Hall	
May 17, 2025	Seoul	South Korea	Olympic Hall	
May 18, 2025	Seoul	South Korea	Olympic Hall	
North America
June 3, 2025	Chicago	United States	The Auditorium	
June 5, 2025	Toronto	Canada	The Theatre at Great Canadian Casino Resort Toronto	
June 7, 2025	Boston	United States	MGM Music Hall at Fenway	
June 10, 2025	New York	United States	Radio City Music Hall	
June 12, 2025	Washington, D.C.	United States	The Theater at MGM National Harbor	
June 15, 2025	Atlanta	United States	Coca-Cola Roxy	
June 17, 2025	Austin	United States	Bass Concert Hall	
June 19, 2025	Irving	United States	The Pavilion at Toyota Music Factory	
June 22, 2025	Los Angeles	United States	YouTube Theater	
June 24, 2025	Oakland	United States	Paramount Theatre Oakland	
June 26, 2025	Seattle	United States	Paramount Theatre	
Asia
August 3, 2025	Hong Kong	China	—N/a	
August 9, 2025	Bangkok	Thailand	—N/a	
August 23, 2025	Singapore		—N/a	
September 16, 2025	Osaka	Japan	—N/a	
September 18, 2025	Tokyo	Japan	—N/a	
September 19, 2025	Tokyo	Japan	—N/a	
September 21, 2025	Fukuoka	Japan	—N/a	
October 4, 2025	Taipei	Taiwan	—N/a	
Australia
October 15, 2025	Auckland	New Zealand	—N/a	
October 18, 2025	Melbourne	Australia	—N/a	
October 21, 2025	Sydney	Australia	—N/a	
October 23, 2025	Brisbane	Australia	—N/a	

== Accolades ==
=== Awards and nominations ===
Name of the award ceremony, year presented, category, nominee of the award, and the result of the nomination
Award ceremony	Year	Category	Nominee / Work	Result	Ref.
Asia Artist Awards	2024	Best Artist Award – Music	Bibi	Won	
Asia Artist Awards	2024	Best Musician – Solo	Bibi	Won	
Asia Artist Awards	2024	New Wave Award	Bibi	Won	
Asia Contents Awards & Global OTT Awards	2024	Best Supporting Actress	Kim Hyeong-seo	Nominated	
Aurora Awards	2022	Music	Bibi	Won	
Baeksang Arts Awards	2024	Best New Actress – Film	Hopeless	Won	
Baeksang Arts Awards	2024	Best New Actress – Television	The Worst of Evil	Nominated	
Blue Dragon Film Awards	2023	Best New Actress	Hopeless	Nominated	
Blue Dragon Series Awards	2022	Best New Female Entertainer	Girls High School Mystery Class	Nominated	
Brand Customer Loyalty Awards (Note: Co-organized by the Korean Customers Council and Brand Keys, this event recognizes the most influential brands in society and culture, as determined through consumer research.)	2021	R&B Soul Artist	Bibi	Won	
Brand Customer Loyalty Awards	2021	Hot Icon Award	Bibi	Nominated	
Korea First Brand Awards	2026	Female Solo Singer (Indonesia)	Bibi	Won	
Korea Grand Music Awards	2024	Best R&B – Female	Bibi	Won	
Korean Hip-hop Awards	2021	New Artist of the Year	Bibi	Nominated	
Korean Hip-hop Awards	2021	R&B Track of the Year	"Kazino"	Nominated	
Korean Hip-hop Awards	2021	R&B Track of the Year	"Automatic Remix"	Nominated	
Korean Hip-hop Awards	2021	Collaboration of the Year	"Automatic Remix"	Nominated	
Korean Hip-hop Awards	2023	R&B Album of the Year	Lowlife Princess: Noir	Nominated	
Korean Music Awards	2023	Best R&B & Soul Song	"Jotto"	Won	
Korean Music Awards	2025	Song of the Year	"Bam Yang Gang"	Nominated	
Korean Music Awards	2025	Best Pop Song	"Bam Yang Gang"	Won	
MAMA Awards	2024	Best Vocal Performance – Solo	"Bam Yang Gang"	Won	
MAMA Awards	2024	Song of the Year	"Bam Yang Gang"	Nominated	
MAMA Awards	2024	Fans' Choice Top 10 – Female	Bibi	Nominated	
Melon Music Awards	2024	Best Music Style	Bibi	Won	
Seoul Music Awards	2023	OST Award	"Very, Slowly"	Nominated	
Seoul Music Awards	2025	R&B / Hip-Hop Award	Bibi	Nominated	
Seoul Music Awards	2025	Ballad Award	Bibi	Nominated	

=== Honors ===
Name of organization, year given, and the name of the honor
Organization	Year	Honor	Ref.
Newsis K-Expo Cultural Awards (Note: Established in 2019 and co-sponsored by Korea's Ministry of Culture, Sports and Tourism, Ministry of Foreign Affairs, Korea Creative Content Agency, Seoul Metropolitan Council and the Seoul Tourism Organization, it awards cultural icons, businesses, and individuals who have contributed greatly to Hallyu, the Korean wave.)	2023	National Assembly Culture, Sports and Tourism Committee Award	

=== Listicles ===
Name of publisher, year listed, name of listicle, and placement
Publisher	Year	Listicle	Placement	Ref.
Forbes	2025	Korea Power Celebrity	18th	
