= Babylon (singer) =

South Korean singer

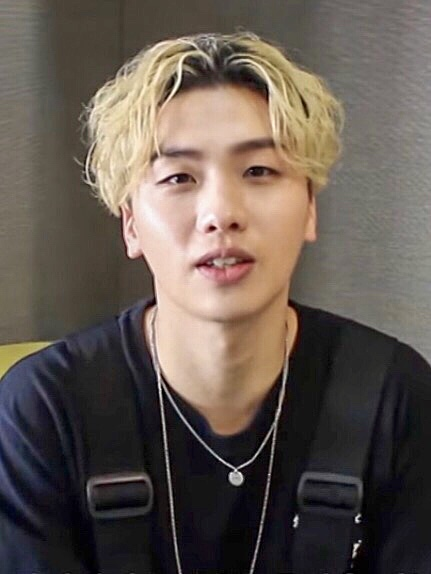
- Babylon in April 2018
- Born: October 1988 (age 37); South Korea
- Occupations: Singer-songwriter; rapper; dancer
- Musical career
- Also known as: Soul J
- Genres: K-pop, R&B
- Instrument: Vocals
- Years active: 2011–present
- Labels: Media Line; KQ
- Formerly of: N-Train
- Website: kqent.com

Korean name
- Hangul: 이종민
- RR: I Jongmin
- MR: I Chongmin

Lee Jong-min (Korean: 이종민; born October 1988), better known by his stage name Babylon (Note: Pronounced /beɪbiːɑːn/ BAY-bee-lahn, it was originally pronounced /bæbɪɑːn/ BA-bi-lahn (바빌론). Spelling of the latter overlapped with a savings bank with the same name, which made searches for the singer difficult. He modified his stage name upon signing with KQ Produce.) (베이빌론), is a South Korean singer-songwriter, rapper, and dancer. He debuted as an idol in the five-member group N-Train under Media Line Entertainment, where he served as a vocalist from 2011 to its dissolution in 2013. He debuted as a soloist in 2015 with "Pray" and released his debut studio album Caelo in 2018.

== Life and career ==
=== 1988–2013: Early life and career beginnings ===
Babylon was born Lee Jong-min in October 1988. After sustaining multiple injuries as a rugby footballer in high school and casting doubt over his career in the sport, he joined a black music club and was influenced to pursue a career as an R&B singer. A singer, rapper, and dancer, Babylon trained with Media Line Entertainment for three years prior to starting his career as an idol. Under the stage name Soul J, he debuted as a member of N-Train with "One Last Cry" on May 25, 2011. The group issued three commercially unsuccessful releases, leading to its disbandment two years later.

=== 2014–present: As a soloist ===
After completing mandatory military service, Babylon became an independent musician. Inspired by the name of a bar in the film Scarface (1983), he adopted his moniker "Babylon" in July 2014. He began posting mixtapes onto hip-hop websites that year, which led to rappers contacting him to collaborate. He was featured on a string of singles, including Paloalto's "Good Times" and "Cheers" alongside Gaeko, Yankie, and Beenzino. Babylon released his debut solo single "Pray" in June 2015. After being contacted by Zico to collaborate, the pair released "Boys and Girls" in November. The single topped South Korea's national Gaon Digital Chart and sold over 2.5 million downloads domestically. The single's success earned Babylon the nicknames "Zico's Man" and the "R&B Rising Trend", and the singer was heralded as a leading figure in R&B along with Zion.T, Crush, and Dean. It also established the pair's respective signature sounds.

Babylon signed with KQ Produce, a sub-label of KQ Entertainment, in 2016. He released the song "Real Talk" on SoundCloud in precedence to the release of his first single album. On April 28, Between Us and its lead single "U & Me" featuring rapper Dok2 were released. Babylon released his second single album Fantasy and accompanying singles "Crush on You" featuring hip hop musician Lil Boi and "Today I Think of You" with singer Kim Na-young on June 23. Babylon released a collaboration with rapper Yezi entitled "Chase" three months later. He released his debut studio album Caelo on October 3, 2018.

== Musical style ==
Musically, Babylon is a R&B singer-songwriter. Noted for having a "honey voice", he has been widely acclaimed in the hip hop community. Babylon has cited Michael Jackson, Chris Brown, You Hee-yeol, and Kim Sung-jae as his role models. He identifies Brown, Musiq Soulchild, BJ the Chicago Kid, and Kehlani as the influences over his music.

== Discography ==
=== Studio albums ===
Title	Album details	Peak chart positions	Sales
Title	Album details	KOR	Sales
Caelo	Released: October 3, 2018; Label: KQ, Sony Music Korea; Format: CD, digital download	74	
Hardy	Released: February 4, 2021; Label: Babylon, Sony Music Korea; Format: CD, digital download	—	
Ego 90's	Released: July 19, 2022; Label: Babylon, Sony Music Korea; Format: CD, digital download	—	
Ego 90's Part 2	Released: December 15, 2022; Label: Babylon, Sony Music Korea; Format: CD, digital download	—	
Colors	Released: September 7, 2023; Label: Babylon, Sony Music Korea; Format: CD, digital download	—	

=== Singles ===
==== As lead artist ====
Title	Year	Peak chart positions	Sales	Album
Title	Year	KOR	Sales	Album
"Pray"	2015	—		Non-album single
"U & Me" (너 나 우리; Neo Na Uri) (featuring Dok2)	2016	69	KOR: 37,257	Between Us (single album)
"Crush on You" (처음 본 여자는 다 예뻐; Cheoeum Bon Yeojaneun Da Yeppeo) (featuring Lil Boi)	2016	61	KOR: 58,551 (Note: Accumulation of "Crush on You" weekly sales: 37,766, 20,785.)	Fantasy (single album)
"Today I Think of You" (오늘도 난; Oneuldo Nan) (featuring Kim Na-young)	2016	—	KOR: 19,590	Fantasy (single album)
"Chase" (끌려다녀; Kkeullyeodanyeo) (with Yezi)	2016	—	KOR: 24,500	Non-album single
"Ocean Drive" (featuring San E)	2017	—		S.S.F.W. (single album)
"Lalala" (라라라) (featuring Chungha)	2017	—		La Vida Loca (single album)
"Everything" (with Hwanhee)	2018	—		Non-album singles
"Everything" (with Eric Benét)	2018	—		Non-album singles
"One More Night" (featuring Vinxen)	2018	—		Caelo
"Karma" (featuring Bewhy, Verbal Jint, The Quiett, TakeOne, Nucksal)	2018	—		Caelo
"Remember" (그리운 건 그때 그대; Geuriun Geon Geuttae Geudae) (featuring Jung Il-hoon of BtoB)	2018	—		Non-album single
"Shadow" (덧칠; Deotchil)	2019	—		Non-album single
"Shadows from the Moon" (너의 두 눈 속 빛나는 달; Neoeui Du Nun Sok Bitnaneun Dal)	2019	—		Non-album single
"Season of Rain" (비는 내리고 음악은 흐르고; Bineun Naerigo Eumakeun Heureugo) (featuring Wall E)	2019	—		Non-album single
"Out of Breath" (행복해지고 싶어; Haengbokhaejigo Shipeo) (with Suzy)	2019	—		Non-album single
"I Will Be Your Warmth" (너의 온기가 되어줄게; Neoeui Ongiga Doeeojulge) (with Yeri)	2019	—		Non-album single
"Nice Weather" (with Gaho)	2020	—		Non-album single
"Automatic" (with Chancellor, twlv, Moon, Bibi, and Jiselle)	2020	—		Non-album single
"Automatic Remix" (with Chancellor, Jay Park, Lee Hi, Bibi, Jamie, Moon, Bumkey, Samuel Seo, Suran, Hoody, Sumin, MRSHLL, Ann One, Elo, twlv, oceanfromtheblue, Jiselle, Sole, Thama, K.vsh, Jinbo, Jerd, Soovi, B.E.D., Xydo, Owell Mood, and None)	2020	—		Non-album single
"Alone" (혼자; Honja) (with Lee Hyori)	2021	—		Hardy
"Like Song" (너가 좋아하는 노래; Neoga Johahaneun Norae) (featuring Jay Park)	2021	—		Hardy
"Empty" (0 Her ㅎrl; 0 Her Hrl) (featuring Nafla)	2021	—		Non-album single
"Beautiful" (잘 어울려; Jal Eoullyeo) (featuring Sam Kim)	2022	—		Ego 90's
"Rain" (비가 와; Biga Wa) (featuring Uhm Jung-hwa)	2022	—		Ego 90's
"Blue Heart" (블루하트; Beullu Hateu) (featuring Lee Hyun-do of Deux)	2022	—		Ego 90's
"Do or Die" (featuring Wheesung)	2022	—		Ego 90's
"Missing You" (그리움; Geurium) (featuring Boni)	2022	—		Ego 90's
"Call Me Anytime" (언제라도; Eonjerado)	2022	—		Ego 90's
"Fantasy" (몽상가; Mongsangga) (featuring Gary, Ali)	2022	—		Ego 90's Part 2
"Tonight" (오늘 밤; Oneul Bam)	2022	—		Ego 90's Part 2
"Think About You" (널 생각해; Neol Saenggakhae) (featuring K.Will)	2022	—		Ego 90's Part 2
"Heater" (히터; Hiteo) (featuring Jung In)	2022	—		Ego 90's Part 2
"Destiny" (featuring Yuju)	2023	—		Colors
"Pink Day" (featuring Seolhyun)	2023	—		Colors
"Empty Canvas" (featuring Lee Young-ji and Layone)	2023	—		Colors

==== As featured artist ====
Title	Year	Peak chart positions	Sales	Album
Title	Year	KOR	Sales	Album
"Are You Listening?" (이노래 듣고있어?) (MJ featuring Babylon)	2014	—		Non-album single
"Good Times" (Paloalto featuring Babylon)	2014	—		Cheers
"Cheers" (Gaeko and Yankie featuring Beenzino and Babylon)	2015	26	KOR: 152,962 (Note: Accumulation of "Cheers" weekly sales: 80,811, 55,305, 16,846.)	Non-album single
"Blu" (Iron featuring Babylon)	2015	35	KOR: 122,979 (Note: Accumulation of "Blu" weekly sales: 50,638, 23,185, 15,600, 10,478, 6,762, 5,079, 4,485, 3,660, 3,092.)	Non-album single
"In the Club" (클럽에서; Keulleobeseo) (ChaMane featuring Babylon)	2015	—		20
"Boys and Girls" (Zico featuring Babylon)	2015	1	KOR: 2,500,000	Gallery
"A Year Like a Day" (하루 같은 일년; Haru Gateun Ilnyeon) (2lson featuring Babylon and NiiHwa)	2015	65		1 Year
"Out of Time" (Snacky Chan featuring Babylon)	2016	—		Non-album single
"You Can Rest" (쉬어도 돼; Swieodo Dwae) (Crucial Star featuring Babylon)	2017	91		Maze Garden
"Stand Up" (Eden featuring Babylon)	2017	—		Urban Hymns
"Beautiful Life" (DJ Juice featuring San E, Verbal Jint, and Babylon)	2017	—		Beatful Life
"Killin It" (Maniac featuring Koonta and Babylon)	2017	—		Show Me the Money 6 Special
"Break" (Verbal Jint featuring Babylon)	2017	—		No Excuses
"Casanova" (카사노바; Kasanoba) (YDG featuring Babylon and Carlos)	2018	—		Song One
"Spoiler" (Jung Il-hoon featuring Babylon)	2019	—		Non-album single
"Stay" (Jang Woo-hyuk featuring Babylon)	2019	—		Non-album single
"All of My Life" (Bumkey featuring Babylon)	2021	—		Non-album single
"Night Time Love" (Queen Wasabii featuring Babylon)	2021	—		Spicy Flower
"Back in the Day (RnB Version)" (TOMNIg featuring Babylon and N.Y.L.A)	2022	—		12 Years Of Digscvry
"When You Approach" (다가갈 때; Dagagal Ttae) (Yaru featuring Babylon)	2022	—		Non-album single
"Wherewegoing" (MUSM featuring Babylon and JIIN)	2023	—		MUSM op.5
"Blush" (Narsha featuring Babylon)	2023	—		Non-album single

=== Guest appearances ===
Title	Year	Other performer(s)	Release
"Be About It"	2015	The Quiett	1 Life 2 Live
"Pathfinder"	2016	TK, Nucksal	Tourist
"Yah!" (야!; Ya!)	2016	Kwon Jin-ah	One Strange Night
"I Can't Do Everything" (아무것도 못하겠어; Amugeotdo Mothagesseo)	2016	MC Mong	U.F.O
"Candy" (캔디; Kaendi)	2016	Bang Seung-ji	Duet Song Festival Episode 29
"Day by Day" (하루하루; Haru Haru)	2016	Bang Seung-ji	Duet Song Festival Episode 30
"My Reflection on My Mind" (내 마음에 비친 내 모습; Nae Maeume Bichin Nae Moseup)	2017	P.O, Eden	30 Years Yoo Jae-ha, Forever as We Are
"Beemer"	2018	Han Yo-han	Dragon Bike
"Drive"	2018	Eden, Cho Seung-youn	Eden_Stardust.04
"How We Do"	2019	Oh Ha-young	Oh!
"Trial and Error" (시행착오; Sihaengchago)	2020	Davii, Minah	Cinema
"Love That Only Heaven Allows" (하늘만 허락한 사랑; Sihaengchago)	2022	—N/a	Hidden Singer7 - Episode. 7

=== Soundtrack appearances ===
Title	Year	Other performer(s)	Release	Ref.
"You"	2017	Czaer, Far East Movement	Man to Man OST	
"Memories"	2018	—N/a	Lawless Lawyer OST	

== Filmography ==
Television series
Title	Year	Role	Notes	Ref.
Show Me the Money	2016	Himself	Seasons 5	
King of Mask Singer	2018	Himself	Episodes 149–150	
