= Lowlife Princess: Noir =

Studio album by Bibi
- Released: November 18, 2022
- Genres: R&B; hip hop
- Length: 30:18
- Languages: Korean; English
- Labels: Feel Ghood; 88rising
- Producer: Bibi

Bibi chronology
Life is a Bi... (2021)	Lowlife Princess: Noir (2022)	Eve: Romance (2025)

Singles from Lowlife Princess: Noir
- 1. "Animal Farm" Released: September 27, 2022; 2. "Motospeed 24" Released: October 24, 2022; 3. "Sweet Sorrow of Mother" Released: October 24, 2022; 4. "Bibi Vengeance" Released: November 18, 2022; 5. "Jotto" Released: November 18, 2022

Lowlife Princess: Noir is the debut studio album of South Korean singer Bibi. It was released on November 18, 2022, through Feel Ghood Music and 88rising. It consists of twelve tracks, and was supported by the release of five singles: "Animal Farm", "Motospeed 24", "Sweet Sorrow of Mother", "Bibi Vengeance", and "Jotto". The album peaked at number seven in her home country of Korea.

== Theme ==
The album "tells the story of the fictional Oh Geum-ji–inspired by the protagonist in Park Chan-wook’s Lady Vengeance" against the dystopian backdrop of the year 2044. Oh Geum-ji was abandoned as a child and wants to be loved even though she is a bad bitch. "As pollution and scarcity ravage Seoul and people fight for control of an underground society à la Sin City, she rises from the depths of despair to become the queen of this lawless land."

== Music and lyrics ==
Bibi tells a story that represents people with low social status. "The production mimics the record’s lyrical ferocity, offering an invigorating mix of sounds from dark pop ("Jotto"), futuristic EDM ("Blade"), pop-rock ("City Love"), Latin-inspired beats (“Bibi Vengeance”) and alternative R&B ("Animal Farm") to name a few."

== Critical reception ==
Professional ratings
Review scores
Source	Rating
IZM	3/5 stars
NME	4/5 stars
Rhythmer	4/5 stars

Yeom Dong-gyo of IZM rated the album 3 out of 5 stars. According to him, "Bibi, who has both skills and charisma, laid the groundwork with honest lyrics and sensuous sounds and solidified her identity with her new album. She appealed to Generation MZ by unraveling a story without hesitation while swinging back and forth between R&B and hip hop."

Tanu Raj of NME rated the album 4 out of 5 stars. According to him, "Bibi claims her place as one of K-pop’s most engaging and evocative storytellers" on her first full-length album.

Kim Hyo-jin of Rhythmer also rated the album 4 out of 5 stars. According to her, "Bibi is definitely a solid storyteller" who "fleshes out a character and fascinates listeners at once with specific settings and appropriate word choices."

=== Year-end lists ===
Select year-end rankings of Lowlife Princess: Noir
Critic/Publication	Accolade	Rank	Ref.
Genius	50 Best Albums of 2022	38	
NME	25 Best Asian Albums of 2022	16	
Rhythmer	10 Best Korean R&B Albums of 2022	7	
Rolling Stone India	15 Best Korean Hip-Hop and R&B Albums of 2022	2	
Time	Best K-Pop Songs and Albums of 2022	Ranked	

== Track listing ==
All lyrics are written by Bibi, except where noted.

No.	Title	Lyrics	Music	Arrangement	Length
1.	"Intro"	The Need	The Need	The Need	1:07
2.	"Blade" (철학보다 무서운건 비비의 총알)		The Need; Bibi	The Need	3:10
3.	"Bibi Vengeance" (나쁜X)		The Need; Bibi	The Need	2:45
4.	"Animal Farm" (가면무도회)		The Need; Bibi	The Need	3:23
5.	"Motospeed 24" (모토스피드 24시)		The Need; Bibi	The Need	2:13
6.	"Sweet Sorrow of Mother" (불륜)		Zoey Cho; Bibi	Cho	1:06
7.	"Loveholic's Hangover" (featuring Sam Kim)		Welcome Ian; Flower Beats; Bibi	Welcome Ian	2:48
8.	"Wet Nightmare"		Max & Kyle; Twlv; Bibi	Max & Kyle	2:58
9.	"Witch Hunt" (마녀사냥)		The Need; Bibi	The Need	1:14
10.	"Lowlife Princess"		The Need; Bibi	The Need	2:31
11.	"Jotto" (조또)		Mikey!; En; Purple; Bibi	Purple	3:13
12.	"City Love"		Purple; Bibi	Purple; U-Turn; Seungq; Yoo Hyun-wook	3:13
Total length:					30:18

== Charts ==
=== Weekly charts ===
Weekly chart performance for Lowlife Princess: Noir
Chart (2022)	Peak position
South Korean Albums (Circle)	7

=== Monthly charts ===
Monthly chart performance for Lowlife Princess: Noir
Chart (2022)	Peak position
South Korean Albums (Circle)	42

== Sales ==
Region	Sales
South Korea	18,711
