= Drunken Tiger =

1999–2018 South Korean hip-hop group

- Origin: South Korea/United States
- Genre: Korean hip hop
- Years active: 1999–2018
- Labels: Feel Ghood; Jungle Entertainment (2006-2013)
- Past members: Tiger JK; DJ Shine; Micki Eyes; DJ Jhig; Roscoe Umali
- Website: www.dt-love.co.kr

Drunken Tiger (Korean: 드렁큰 타이거) was a Korean hip-hop group that debuted in 1999 and has since released several albums and won numerous awards. They are known as pioneers of Korean hip-hop who helped bring the genre into the mainstream.

The group's original line-up consisted of central member Tiger JK, as well as DJ Shine. Micki Eyes, DJ Jhig, and Roscoe Umali later joined the group. In 2013, Tiger JK moved away from making music under the group's original name and formed MFBTY with his wife Yoon Mi-Rae and Bizzy. In 2018, Tiger JK released a final self titled album under the Drunken Tiger name, featuring Yoon Mi-Rae and Bizzy alongside a number of other artists.

== History ==
=== 1998-2000: Debut and early controversy ===
In 1998, Korean-American rappers Tiger JK and DJ Shine teamed up to form Drunken Tiger. They released their first album, Year of the Tiger in Korea in 1999. At the time, the album was controversial given its explicit lyrics and rejection of mainstream K-pop norms. Unlike their K-pop counterparts, Drunken Tiger wrote their own lyrics, expressed anti-establishment views, and did not perform choreography. However, the album's singles, "I Want You" and "Do You Know Hip-hop," are now considered Korean hip hop classics.

=== 2000-2004: Drug charges and early success ===
In 2000, Drunken Tiger released their second album, The Great Rebirth, and introduced new members DJ Jhig, Micki Eyes, and Roscoe Umali. The album did well on music charts and established the group as "the first commercially successful true hip hop group" in Korea.

However, in the midst of the group's success, Tiger JK was arrested for using methamphetamine in Korea in 1999. Tiger JK said that, though he had used drugs in the past, he had not used them in Korea, and he said that he was ultimately found guilty due to false testimony from the members of the hip hop group Uptown, who has also been arrested on drug charges. Tiger JK spent a month and a half in jail and was sentenced to two years probation. As a result, Drunken Tiger was banned from performing on public media for two years. However, after appealing the decision, the ban was lifted, allowing the group to release their third album in 2001.

2001's The Legend Of..., is one of Drunken Tiger's most successful albums. Their single "Good Life" became a huge hit, topping Korean music charts for weeks. They went on to win Best Hip Hop Performance at the 2001 MNET Music Video Festival and the Hip-Hop/Rap Award at the 2001 Seoul Music Awards.

The group released the albums Foundation and One Is Not A Lonely Word in 2003 and 2004, respectively. By this point, Drunken Tiger's appeal had grown internationally, with the group gaining fans and performing in countries including Japan, China, and Taiwan.

=== 2005-2012: Departure of DJ Shine and continued success ===
In 2005, during the debut of the group's sixth album, 1945 Liberation, founding member DJ Shine announced he would leave Drunken Tiger. Tiger JK continued using the group's name as a solo artist, and, with the success of the fifth album, signed endorsement deals with Hite Beer and Reebok. In 2006, Tiger JK established his own hip-hop label, Jungle Entertainment, which became the new home of Drunken Tiger.

The release of Drunken Tiger's seventh album, Sky Is The Limit, marked another high point in Drunken Tiger's career. Although Tiger JK's ability to perform was inhibited by his recently diagnosed acute transverse myelitis, the album's single "8:45 Heaven," a tribute to his late grandmother, became a fan favorite and won Best Hip Hop Song at the 2008 Korean Music Awards.

Drunken Tiger released its eighth album, Feel gHood Muzik, in 2009. The double-disc album featured American hip-hop legend, Rakim, as well as Roscoe Umali, who had not appeared on the last few Drunken Tiger releases. The album sold over 100,000 copies, and all 27 tracks debuted on the Top 100 K-Pop Singles chart. The album ultimately won Record of the Year at the 2010 Seoul Music Awards and Best Hip Hop Album at the 2010 Korean Music Awards. Drunken Tiger released the song, Doo Doo Doo Wap Ba Balu, in 2011 featuring the top 13 contestants of Korea's Next Top Model (season 2).

=== 2013-present: Forming MFBTY and Feel Ghood Music ===
In 2013, Tiger JK and label mates Yoon Mi-rae and Bizzy released the song, "Sweet Dream," under the group name MFBTY. An acronym for "My Fans [are] Better Than Yours," the name MFBTY started as a joke between Tiger JK and fans on Twitter. Although the name was meant to be temporary, the three artists have made subsequent releases as MFBTY, as well as under their solo names.

Later that year, the three artists left Tiger JK's own Jungle Entertainment and signed to his new label, Feel Ghood Music. In September, they released the album The Cure, under the name Drunken Tiger ft. Yoon MiRae and Bizzy. The album, which peaked at #6 on the K-Pop Hot 100 chart, was a tribute to Tiger JK's father, who was battling cancer at the time.

In 2015, MFBTY released the album Wondaland, which was an immediate success. Hours after its release, 17 of the top 20 songs on Daum's music chart were from Wondaland. The album ultimately reached #8 on Billboard's World Albums chart. Tiger JK said the reason he wasn't making music under the name Drunken Tiger anymore was because his young son did not like the word "drunken." In 2018, Tiger JK released a final self titled album under the Drunken Tiger name, featuring Yoon Mi-Rae and Bizzy, as well as other artists including Dok2, Eun Ji-won, RM, and Junoflo.

== Members ==
- Tiger JK (Seo Jung-kwon) — 1998–2018
- DJ Shine (Lim Byong-wook) — 1998–2005
- DJ Jhig (James Jung) — 2000–2003
- Roscoe Umali — 2000–2002
- Micki Eyes (Mike Amiri) — 2000–2002, 2018

== Discography ==
=== Studio albums ===
Title	Album details	Peak chart positions	Sales
Title	Album details	KOR	Sales
Year of the Tiger	Released: February 2, 1999; Label: Doremi Media; Format: CD, cassette	20	KOR: 97,496+
The Great Rebirth	Released: March 29, 2000; Label: Doremi Media; Format: CD, cassette	3	KOR: 137,035+
The Legend Of...	Released: March 22, 2001; Label: Doremi Media; Format: CD, cassette	7	KOR: 166,900+
Foundation (뿌리)	Released: February 25, 2003; Label: Doremi Media; Format: CD, cassette	8	KOR: 117,164+
One Is Not A Lonely Word (하나하면 너와나)	Released: August 13, 2004; Label: Doremi Media; Format: CD, cassette	4	KOR: 54,982+
1945 Liberation (1945 해방)	Released: August 12, 2005; Label: Doremi Media; Format: CD, cassette	3	KOR: 40,178+
Sky Is The Limit	Released: September 5, 2007; Label: CJ E&M; Format: CD, cassette		
Feel gHood Muzik : The 8th Wonder	Released: June 29, 2009; Label: Jungle Entertainment; Format: CD	—N/a	—N/a
The Cure (with Yoon Mi-rae & Bizzy)	Released: September 13, 2013; Label: Feel Ghood Music, Kakao Entertainment; Format: CD, digital download	11	KOR: 6,811+
Drunken Tiger X : Rebirth Of Tiger JK	Released: November 14, 2018; Label: Feel Ghood Music, Genie Music, Stone Music Entertainment; Format: CD, digital download	22	KOR: 4,437+

=== Singles ===
Title	Year	Peak chart positions	Album
Title	Year	KOR	Album
"I Want You" (난 널 원해)	1999	—N/a	Year of the Tiger
"Do You Know Hip Hop?" (너희가 힙합을 아느냐?)	1999	—N/a	Year of the Tiger
"Fetticini" (위대한 탄생)	2000	—N/a	The Great Rebirth
"Good Life"	2001	—N/a	The Legend Of...
"Is Ask Hizay?"	2001	—N/a	The Legend Of...
"Because I'm A Man" (남자기 때문에)	2003	—N/a	Foundation
"Thumb" (엄지 손가락)	2003	—N/a	Foundation
"Liquor Shots" (술병에 숟가락) feat. Bobby Kim, Ann	2004	—N/a	One Is Not A Lonely Word
"Convenience Store" (편의점) feat. Gemini	2004	—N/a	One Is Not A Lonely Word
"Isolated Ones! Left Foot Forward!" (소외된 모두, 왼발을 한 보 앞으로!)	2005	—N/a	1945 Liberation
"Uncensored Love Song" (심의에 안 걸리는 사랑노래)	2005	—N/a	1945 Liberation
"Happiness Is" (행복의 조건)	2007	—N/a	Sky Is The Limit
"8:45 Heaven"	2007	—N/a	Sky Is The Limit
"I Hate Myself" (내가 싫다)	2007	—N/a	Sky Is The Limit
"True Romance" feat. Yoon Mi-rae	2009	—N/a	Feel gHood Muzik : The 8th Wonder
"Monster"	2009	—N/a	Feel gHood Muzik : The 8th Wonder
"The Cure" (살자) with Yoon Mi-rae, Bizzy	2013	3	The Cure
"Beautiful Life" with Yoon Mi-rae, Bizzy	2013	20	The Cure
"Yet"	2018	—	Drunken Tiger X : Rebirth Of Tiger JK
"Bumaye" (범바예)	2018	—	Drunken Tiger X : Rebirth Of Tiger JK
"Mantra" (끄덕이는 노래)	2018	—	Drunken Tiger X : Rebirth Of Tiger JK
"—" denotes song did not chart.

== Awards ==
=== Mnet Asian Music Awards ===
Year	Category	Nominated work	Result
1999	Best Hip Hop Performance	"Do You Know Hip-Hop"	Nominated
2001	Best Hip Hop Performance	"Good Life"	Won
2003	Best Hip Hop Performance	"Because I'm A Man"	Nominated
2004	Best Hip Hop Performance	"Liquor Shots"	Nominated
2005	Music Video of the Year	"Isolated Ones! Left Foot Forward!"	Won
2007	Best Hip Hop Performance	"8:45 Heaven"	Nominated

=== Seoul Music Awards ===
Year	Category	Nominated work	Result
2001	Hip Hop/Rap Award	Drunken Tiger	Won
2010	Record of the Year	Feel gHood Muzik : The 8th Wonder	Won
2010	Hip Hop/Rap Award	Drunken Tiger	Won
2019	Hip Hop/Rap Award	Drunken Tiger	Won

=== Golden Disk Awards ===
Year	Category	Nominated work	Result
2005	Best Music Video	"Isolated Ones! Left Foot Forward"	Won
2009	Best Disk of the Year	Drunken Tiger	Won

=== Korean Music Awards ===
Year	Category	Nominated work	Result
2008	Best Hip Hop Song	"8:45 Heaven"	Won
2010	Best Hip Hop Album	Feel gHood Muzik : The 8th Wonder	Won

== Select live performances ==
Date	Concert title	City	Other performers
May 13, 2006	Movement Concert	Seoul, South Korea	YDG, Epik High, Eun Ji-won, Buga Kingz, Dynamic Duo, Leessang
2006		Seoul, South Korea	Jay-Z
July 21, 2007	Summer Big4 Concert - Exciting Star	Seoul, South Korea	Epik High, Dynamic Duo, Yoon Mi-rae
November 30, 2007	Linkin Park Projekt Revolution World Tour	Seoul, South Korea	Linkin Park, Dynamic Duo
September 27, 2009	R16 Korea (World BBoy Series)	Incheon, South Korea	Rakaa (of (Dilated Peoples), Epik High
July 22–23, 2011	Caribbean Bay Summer Wave Festival	Yongin, Gyeonggi Province, South Korea	T-Pain, 2PM, Will.i.am, Yoon Mi-rae, and more
August 5, 2011	Super Traxx Concert	Incheon, South Korea	Taeyang, Miss A, G-Dragon & T.O.P, Yoon Mi-rae, B.o.B.
December 2, 2011	The Jungle Concert in L.A.	Los Angeles, California, United States	Yoon Mi-rae, Leessang, Bizzy, Jung In
July 14–15, 2012	Caribbean Bay Summer Wave Festival	Yongin, Gyeonggi Province, South Korea	Taio Cruz, Ludacris, M-Flo, Yoon Mi-rae, and more
August 10–12, 2012	World Electronica Carnival	Gapyeong, Gyeonggi Province, South Korea	Yoon Mi-rae, Daishi Dance, Shinichi Osawa, DJ Shadow, Benny Benassi, Far East Movement, and more
