= Diminished =

Diminished may refer to:

- Diminution in music
- "Diminished" (R.E.M. song), from the 1998 album Up
- Diminished, a 2024 album by twlv
