= Life Is a Bi... =

EP by Bibi
- Released: April 28, 2021
- Genre: R&B; pop
- Length: 12:00
- Language: Korean; English
- Label: Feel Ghood

Bibi chronology
The Manual for People Who Want to Love (2019)	Life Is a Bi... (2021)	Lowlife Princess: Noir (2022)

Singles from Life Is a Bi...
- 1. "Bad Sad and Mad" Released: April 28, 2021; 2. "Life Is a Bi..." Released: April 28, 2021

Life Is a Bi... (Korean: 인생은 나쁜X; RR: Insaengeun Nappeun-X) is the second extended play by South Korean singer Bibi. It was released on April 28, 2021, through Feel Ghood Music. It peaked at number 31 on the Gaon Album Chart.

== Background ==
In an interview with BNT, Bibi explained why she named the album Life is a Bi....

Everything in life came to me like temptation. I came to think of life as a bad bitch that teases me and cannot be understood.

== Music and lyrics ==
According to Seoul Beats, "Bibi likens her perspective of life to experiencing inner conflicts from a toxic relationship." In “Piri the dog,” she "reveals the severe emotional consequences of a codependent relationship, likening herself to an abandoned dog." Unlike the gloomy lyrics, the music is "rather bright", characterized by trap-based repetitive melodies. "Birthday Cake" expresses sadness with the sound of falling water droplets and "Life is a Bi..." properly uses string instruments to heighten emotions.

== Critical reception ==
Kim Do-yeon of IZM rated the album 3 out of 5 stars. According to her, "Bibi tries to draw empathy from listeners by honestly telling her story in a short time. The album will comfort those in their 20s and help those turning 20 overcome difficult moments."

Kim Hyo-jin of Rhythmer rated the album 2.5 out of 5 stars. According to her, "the depiction of the universality of tragedy is interesting." However, "the music to support it is unpolished and the story was not fully developed due to the small number of songs."

=== Year-end lists ===
Select year-end rankings of Life Is a Bi...
Critic/Publication	Accolade	Rank	Ref.
Harper's Bazaar	Top 15 K-Pop Albums of 2021	9	
HipHopDX	Asia's 20 Best Albums of 2021	Ranked	
Rolling Stone India	10 Best Korean Hip-Hop and R&B Albums of 2021	7	

== Track listing ==
All lyrics are written by Bibi; all music is composed by Stevenc4stle and Bibi, except where noted; all music is arranged by Stevenc4stle.

No.	Title	Music	Length
1.	"Umm... Life"		2:11
2.	"Bad Sad and Mad"	Stevenc4stle; Badassgatsby; Bibi	2:34
3.	"Piri the Dog" (피리)		2:20
4.	"Birthday Cake"		2:16
5.	"Life is a Bi..." (인생은 나쁜X)		2:36
Total length:			12:00

== Charts ==
=== Weekly charts ===
Weekly chart performance for Life Is a B...
Chart (2021)	Peak position
South Korean Albums (Gaon)	31

=== Monthly charts ===
Monthly chart performance for Life Is a B...
Chart (2022)	Peak position
South Korean Albums (Gaon)	91

== Sales ==
Region	Sales
South Korea	4,257
