= DJ Shine =

Korean-American rapper (born 1974)

- Born: Lim Byung-wook (임병욱); June 11, 1974 (age 52)
- Origin: New York City, United States
- Genres: Hip hop, alternative hip hop
- Occupations: Rapper, DJ, Producer
- Instruments: Sampler, Keyboards, Synthesizer
- Years active: 1990s–2005, present
- Labels: Oasis Entertainment, K & Music, Doremi Records

DJ Shine (born June 11, 1974) is a Korean Rapper, Producer, DJ formerly associated with popular Korean Hip hop group, Drunken Tiger.

== Career ==
Shine started performing as a DJ in small clubs in New York City and Los Angeles. Shine met Tiger JK in a rap event and they found similar interests to form a hip hop group in Los Angeles. After a successful concert, the duo attracted the attention of South Korean music company. They were signed to the company and debuted as Drunken Tiger, their debut album released in South Korea.

Shine left the group for personal reasons in mid-2005. Then he continued to focus on more mainstream and pop music styles than old school rap styles. Shine is also the executive producer of music company, K & Music.

On 2006, he produced and wrote a song for the soundtrack for the movie Cinderella titled, Plastic World. The lyrics are all written in English. Shine also made a Korean version of Flo Rida's hit single, Right Round.
