= Kazino =

2020 single by Bibi

Single by Bibi
- Released: April 29, 2020
- Genre: R&B
- Length: 3:05
- Label: FeelGhoodMusic

Music video
- "Kazino" on YouTube

"Kazino" (Korean: 사장님 도박은 재미로 하셔야 합니다; lit. Boss, you should gamble only for fun) is a song by South Korean singer Bibi. It was released as a single on April 29, 2020, through FeelGhoodMusic. It was later nominated for R&B Track of the Year at the Korean Hip-hop Awards.

== Background ==
In an interview with Elle Korea, Bibi said that she named the song "Boss, you should gamble only for fun" to show that it does not promote gambling.

== Music and lyrics ==
Bibi describes the psychology of gamblers with lyrics such as "Dice and ice cube, it's too dangerous out here/ Home girls bitches shuffling cards/ Spin it spin it pussy, let them go/ Chips and chips and chips and bet yourself." She claims that gambling and life are "repetition of temptation and choice that we cannot resist even though we know their dangers", singing "Taste the muzzle of a gun/ Taste the taste of money". She dreams of escaping from games and choices, singing "Pick that card to save me".

== Music video ==
Bibi plays the role of "the heroine freed from crisis" while Tiger JK appears as the boss. Actors Seo Ho-cheol and Park Se-hyeon also make appearances in the video.

== Critical reception ==
Critics of Music Y rated the song 3.5 out of 5 stars. Kim Seong-hwan praised Bibi's vocal sense that is not "weighed down by the trendy sound".

Critics of Tonplein picked the song as one of the best R&B tracks of 2020. Cho Ji-hwan noted that the unique charm of the song comes from its bridge.

== Awards and nominations ==
Award	Year	Category	Result	Ref.
Korean Hip-hop Awards	2021	R&B Track of the Year	Nominated	
