= Vardaan Arora =

Indian recording artist, songwriter and actor

- Born: 22 April 1992 (age 34); New Delhi, India
- Education: The British School, New Delhi; NYU Tisch School of the Arts
- Occupations: Musician, actor

Vardaan Arora (born 22 April 1992) is an Indian recording artist, songwriter, and actor based in New York.

== Early life ==
Vardaan Arora was born in New Delhi, India. After attending The British School in New Delhi, he went on to study theatre at New York University's Tisch School of the Arts.

== Career ==
Vardaan Arora's introduction to the pop music scene happened with his debut single, "Feel Good Song", in 2016. The song, written by Arora himself, charted on Spotify's Viral 50. In 2018, following the release of his single What If, Arora was named one of Billboard's 12 LGBTQ Musicians to Discover During Pride Month alongside up and coming openly queer acts such as Jesse Saint John, Zolita, REYNA, and others. Arora most recently released singles "January" and "thirty under thirty" in 2019. He co-penned the tracks with songwriter Natalia Lalwani, who is also originally from India.

As an actor, Vardaan Arora was to appear on Netflix's psychological thriller television series Gypsy, starring Naomi Watts.

Arora has been an outspoken advocate for the LGBT community, and has also been open about his struggles with obsessive–compulsive disorder in order to gather more awareness about mental health issues.

In 2019, Arora was cast in the film Wrong Turn.

In August 2020, Arora released his debut EP, Heartbreak On The Dance Floor. Arora told Billboard, "I think I went into this industry pretty blindly, and because of that, I was still figuring out who I was as an artist for those four years...I'm aiming to make a big impact — I want to make a statement with this." Billboard wrote, "It's clear that Arora succeeded: the pure synth-pop he delivers on Heartbreak is some of his best yet, all packaged within the cohesive confines of a well-defined '80s aesthetic." The music video for the title track was featured in Rolling Stone who wrote, "Arora explores confidence, anxiety, sexiness, self-doubt and aims to portray that all these emotions can co-exist. Diving into glimmering pop that swivels every now and then, Arora has a handle on catchy pop that still places the most importance on emotive melodies."

== Discography ==
=== Extended plays ===
Title	Details
Heartbreak on the Dance Floor	Released: 21 August 2020; Label: Independent; Format: Digital Download

=== Singles ===
Title	Year	Album
"BOLO BOLO (Now or Never)"	2023	Non-album singles
"Never Believed In Love"	2023	Non-album singles
"CMBYN" (by Luke Markinson)	2023	Feature on a non-album single
"addicted to sad"	2023	Non-album singles
"It's Ok If You Forget Me"	2023	Non-album singles
"Diamond Tears"	2022	Non-album singles
"damn (can you let me live)"	2022	Non-album singles
"SOLO DISCO" (featuring Kit Major)	2022	Non-album singles
"sunday scaries"	2021	Non-album singles
"obsessive"	2021	Non-album singles
"I Don't Wanna Know" (featuring MRSHLL)	2020	Heartbreak on the Dance Floor
"Imposter Syndrome"	2020	Heartbreak on the Dance Floor
"Rare"	2020	Heartbreak on the Dance Floor
"Drama" (featuring nicopop)	2020	Non-album singles
"Famous"	2019	Non-album singles
"thirty under thirty"	2019	Non-album singles
"january"	2019	Non-album singles
"Dance Like You"	2018	Non-album singles
"What If"	2018	Non-album singles
"Like A Polaroid"	2017	Non-album singles
"Poison"	2017	Non-album singles
"Just Like That"	2016	Non-album singles
"Feel Good Song"	2016	Non-album singles
