= Suran (singer) =

South Korean singer

Suran 신수란
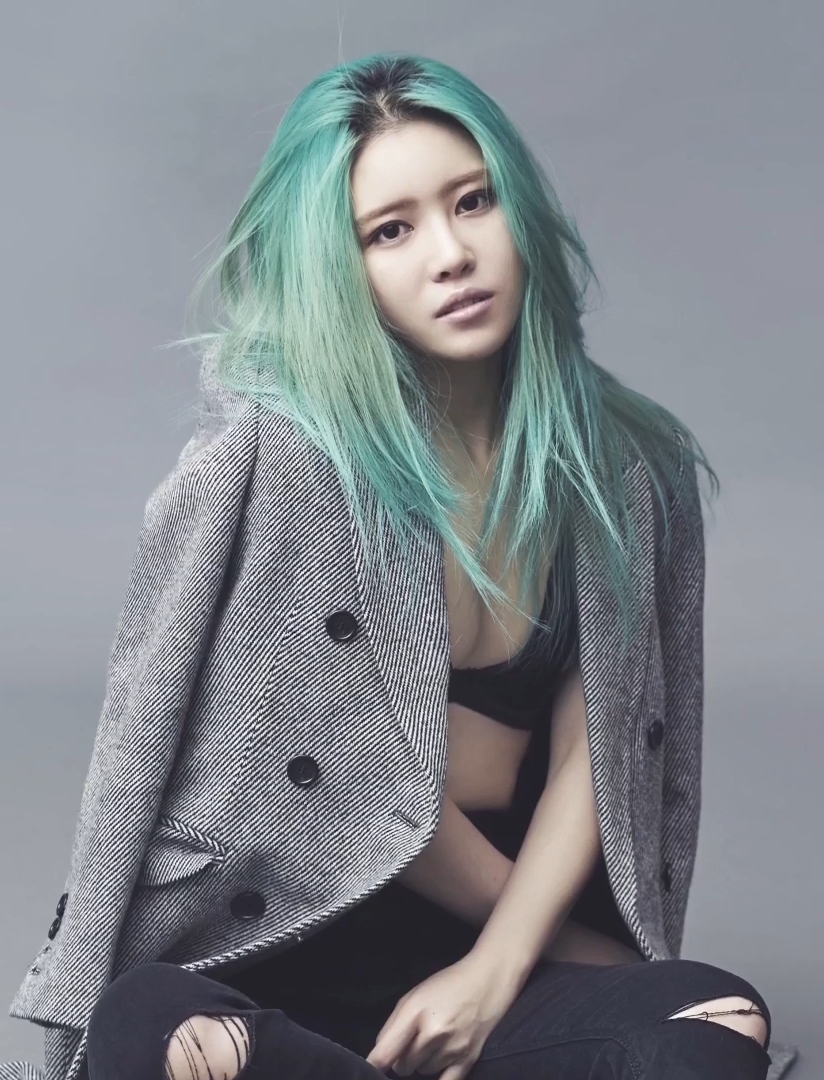
- Suran in 2016

Background information
- Also known as: Elena; Baily Shoo
- Born: Shin Su-ran; July 15, 1986 (age 40); Chuncheon, Gangwon, South Korea
- Genres: R&B; K-pop
- Occupations: Singer-songwriter; record producer
- Instrument: Vocals
- Years active: 2014–present
- Labels: Million Market; S-TASY

Korean name
- Hangul: 신수란
- RR: Sin Suran
- MR: Sin Suran

Shin Su-ran (Korean: 신수란; born July 15, 1986), also known by her stage names Elena (엘에나) and Baily Shoo (베일리 슈) and better known by the mononym Suran (수란), is a South Korean singer. She debuted as part of the duo Lodia on July 9, 2014, with the single "I Got a Feeling".

== Career ==
=== 2017–present: "Wine" and Walkin ===
In January 2017, she appeared on MBC's King of Mask Singer (episodes 93–94) as a contestant named "Skip to the End, Hello".

On April 24, 2017, the singer released a digital single called "Wine" in a collaborative production including BTS' Suga, Slow Rabbit, Suran herself, and featuring rapper Changmo, who also co-produced. The song peaked at number two on the Gaon Digital Chart, selling over 500,000 digital downloads by the end of May.

After the success of the single, the singer released her debut extended play, Walkin', on June 2, 2017, peaking at number 30 on the Gaon Album Chart. The title track "1+1=0" featuring Dean was released on the same day, peaking at number 32 on the Gaon Digital Chart and selling over 100,000 digital downloads.

== Personal life ==
In an episode of Video Star in April 2019, Suran revealed that she was diagnosed with breast cancer in 2015, which resulted in her having a mastectomy.

== Discography ==
=== Extended plays ===
Title	Album details	Peak chart positions	Sales
Title	Album details	KOR	Sales
Walkin'	Released: June 2, 2017; Label: Million Market, LOEN Entertainment; Formats: CD, digital download	30	KOR: 963+
Jumpin'	Released: March 22, 2019; Label: Million Market; Formats: CD, digital download	92	—N/a
FLYIN' PART1	Released: March 23, 2022; Label: S-TASY, Unique Tunes Records; Formats: CD, digital download	—	—N/a

=== Singles ===
Title	Year	Peak chart positions		Sales (DL)	Album
Title	Year	KOR	KOR Hot 100	Sales (DL)	Album
As lead artist
"I Feel"	2014	—	—	—N/a	Non-album singles
"Calling In Love" feat. Beenzino	2015	—	—	—N/a	Non-album singles
"Ddang" (땡땡땡) feat. Hwasa	2016	—	—	—N/a	Non-album singles
"Paradise Go" (떠날랏꼬)	2016	—	—	—N/a	Non-album singles
"Winter Bird" (겨울새)	2016	—	—	—N/a	Non-album singles
"Wine" (오늘 취하면) prod. Suga feat. Changmo	2017	2	11	KOR: 2,500,000	Walkin'
"1+1=0" feat. Dean	2017	32	66	KOR: 150,343+	Walkin'
"Sad Pain" (슬픈 아픔)	2017	—	—	—N/a	Non-album singles
"Love Story" (러브스토리) feat. Crush	2017	17	37	KOR: 242,923+	Non-album singles
"Hide and Seek" (그놈의 별) feat. Heize	2019	70	—	—N/a	Non-album singles
"Don’t hang up" (전화끊지마) feat. pH-1	2019	179	—	—N/a	Jumpin'
"OJB" (어젯밤 꿈에)	2019	—	—	—N/a	Jumpin'
"Surfin'" (서핑해)	2019	—	—	—N/a	Non-album singles
"Wait for you" (널 기다리고 있을게)	2019	—	—	—N/a	Non-album singles
"The Door" feat. Car, the Garden	2020	—	—	—N/a	Non-album singles
"Sunny" (Note: Remix single "Sunny (TAK Remix)" feat. BIG Naughty was released on 22 April 2021)	2021	—		—N/a	FLYIN' PART1
"Blanket" feat. Wonstein	2021	—	—	—N/a	Non-album single
"Devils in the city" feat. Dok2	2022	—	—	—N/a	FLYIN' PART1
"Diamonds" feat. TAEYONG	2022	—	—	—N/a	FLYIN' PART1
"Shining Love Song"	2022	—	—	—N/a	Shining Love Song: the COLOR pearl violet
"Forget Me Not" (어쩌면 우리는 이별하지 못한지도)	2023	—	—	—N/a	Non-album singles
"Only One" feat. Daniel Schulz (Note: Remix single "Only One (Jake K Remix)" feat. Daniel Schulz was released on 29 September 2023)	2023	—	—	—N/a	Non-album singles
"The Day After You Said Goodbye"	2023	—	—	—N/a	Non-album singles
Collaborations
"2013~Forever" (2013~영원히) with KittiB	2016	—	—	—N/a	Melody To Masterpiece
"The Way Home" (집으로) with Im Se-jun, Park Bo-ram & Yu Sung-eu	2016	—	—	—N/a	Melody To Masterpiece
"I Love You, Be Happy" (사랑해 행복해) with KCM & Yu Sung-eun	2016	—	—	—N/a	Melody To Masterpiece
"I'm Sorry" (미안합니다) with Jhameel Kim	2016	—	—	—N/a	Melody To Masterpiece
"Twinkle" with Park Hye-soo	2017	—	—	—N/a	King of Mask Singer
"I Have a Girlfriend" (난 여자가 있는데)	2017	—	—	—N/a	King of Mask Singer
"Groggy" (꾸러기) with Kim Bum-soo	2018	—	—	—N/a	The Call
"SOME MORE" (썸머) with Gray, Loco, Eddy Kim	2018	—	—	—N/a	The Call
"Remember" among The Call artists	2018	—	—	—N/a	The Call
"COCO" (코코) with Sunwoo Jung-a, Park Kyung, Kim Hyunwoo, Song Yuvin	2019	—	—	—N/a	Melody Bookstore
"Little Prince (Withered Flower)" (어린 왕자 (시들어버린 꽃)) with Sunwoo Jung-a, Park Kyung, Song Yuvin	2019	—	—	—N/a	Melody Bookstore
"Try to meet" (만나려 해) with Sunwoo Jung-a, Park Kyung, Kim Hyunwoo, Song Yuvin, Parc Jae-jung	2019	—	—	—N/a	Melody Bookstore
"Goin’ Crazy (Prod. Park Kyung) Feat. Ravi" (미안합니다) with Sunwoo Jung-a, Park Kyung, Kim Hyunwoo, Song Yuvin	2019	—	—	—N/a	Melody Bookstore
"Moon, sleep, dream... we" (달, 잠, 꿈... 우리) with Sunwoo Jung-a, Kim Hyunwoo, Park Kyung, Kim Tae-hyun, Song Yuvin	2019	—	—	—N/a	Melody Bookstore
"This is me" (이런 나 그것도 너) with Sunwoo Jung-a	2019	—	—	—N/a	Melody Bookstore
"Hero of heroes (Feat. Hangzoo, with Kim Jae-heung of DickPunks)" with Kim Hyunwoo	2019	—	—	—N/a	Melody Bookstore
"Still Standing" (봄은 너니까) with Yesung	2020	—	—	—N/a	SM Station Season 4
"Automatic Remix" (with Chancellor, Jay Park, Lee Hi, Bibi, Jamie, Moon, Bumkey, Samuel Seo, Babylon, Hoody, Sumin, MRSHLL, Ann One, Elo, twlv, oceanfromtheblue, Jiselle, Sole, Thama, K.vsh, Jinbo, Jerd, Soovi, B.E.D., Xydo, Owell Mood, and None)	2020	—	—	—N/a	Non-album single
"Mine" with Bumkey & dress	2021	— (Note: "Mine" did not enter Gaon Digital Chart, but peaked at number 37 on the component Gaon Download Chart.)	—	—N/a	Mine with KozyPop
"Photography" (사진 (하늘만 바라봐)) with San E	2021	— (Note: "Mine" did not enter Gaon Digital Chart, but peaked at number 69 on the component Gaon Download Chart.)	—	—N/a	Cyworld BGM 2021
"Darling" with Peder Elias	2022	—	—	—N/a	Non-album single
As featured artist
"Mannequin" (마네퀸) Primary feat. Beenzino & Suran	2015	11	—	KOR: 216,611+	2
"Pride and Prejudice" (오만과 편견) Zico feat. Suran	2015	14	—	KOR: 187,121+	Gallery
"And" (끝) Xitsuh feat. Suran	2016	61	—	KOR: 73,970+	Show Me the Money 5
"Beside Me" Code Kunst feat. BewhY, YDG & Suran	2016	92	—	KOR: 21,264+	Muggle's Mansion
"3AM" (밤에 들어줘) Kiggen feat. Suran & Hanhae	2016	—	—	KOR: 14,338+	Song For the Night
"No Thnx" Yuk Ji-dam feat. Suran & Dean	2016	83	—	KOR: 22,899+	Unpretty Rapstar 3
"So Far Away" Agust D (Suga of BTS) feat. Suran	2016	—	—	—N/a	Agust D
"Voice" Tak feat. Suran	2016	—	—	—N/a	Voice
"Love Is a Dog From Hell" (사랑은 지옥에서 온 개) Mad Clown feat. Suran	2017	17	—	KOR: 137,618+	Love is a Dog From Hell
"ZINZA" (진자) Woo Won-jae feat. YDG, Suran	2017	33	—	KOR: 118,119+	Show Me The Money 6
"Somewhere" (어디쯤에) GroovyRoom feat. Suran, PH-1	2017	78	—	KOR: 32,120	Everywhere
"BONGJESEON" (봉제선) Dynamic Duo feat. Suran	2018	38	—	—N/a	Non-album singles
"LALALA" (너의 뒤에서) Bumkey feat. Loco & Suran	2018	—	—	—N/a	Non-album singles
"Love Rain" Yuju of GFriend feat. Suran	2018	—	—	—N/a	Non-album singles
"Peach" Reddy feat. Suran	2018	—	—	—N/a	Telescope
"Empty" (빈털터리) Junhyung feat. Suran	2019	148	—	—N/a	Non-album single
"TEMPERATURE" (온도) MC Mong feat. Suran	2019	49	—	—N/a	CHANNEL 8
"When I fall in love" (마네퀸) Primary feat. Meego & Suran	2019	—	—	—N/a	3-PAKTORY02
"WISH" TRADE L feat. Suran	2022	—	—	—N/a	Non-album singles
"What's wrong" (왜 이래) HAAN, JUNE feat. Suran	2023	—	—	—N/a	Non-album singles
Soundtrack appearances
"To Your Dream" (너의 꿈에)	2016	—	—	—N/a	Entertainer OST
"Step Step"	2016	90	—	KOR: 88,559+	Don't Dare to Dream OST
"Heartbeat"	2017	—	—	—N/a	Strong Girl Bong-soon OST
"Winter Tree" (바람이 차갑네요)	2017	—	—	—N/a	Innocent Defendant OST
"Still Breathe"	2017	—	—	—N/a	Cross Country OST
"Cross Country" (크로스컨트리) with Ha:tfelt and Kim Bo-hyung	2017	—	—	—N/a	Cross Country OST
"Water Orchid" (수란 (水蘭))	2017	—	—	—N/a	The Emperor: Owner of the Mask OST
"Where Are You" (어디있나요)	2017	—	—	—N/a	Distorted OST
"I'll Be Fine" (뒷모습)	2018	—	—	—N/a	A Korean Odyssey OST
"Dazzling" (눈부셔)	2018	—	—	—N/a	My Secret Terrius OST
"Into The Abyss" with Coogie	2019	—	—	—N/a	Abyss OST
"Hibye" (안녕?!)	2019	—	—	—N/a	Love Playlist Season 4 OST
"Two People" (두사람)	2020	—	—	—N/a	Find Me in Your Memory OST
"Confuse" (마음이 이상해)	2020	—	—	—N/a	Soul Mechanic OST
"O.V.E.R"	2020	—	—	—N/a	Cheat on Me If You Can OST
"One In A Million"	2021	—	—	—N/a	Lovestruck in the City OST
"Glory"	2021	—	—	—N/a	Elsword OST: GLORY
"Stay Alive"	2021	—	—	—N/a	High Class OST
"One & Only"	2022	—	—	—N/a	Tracer OST
"I′ll tell you today" (오늘은 고백할래)	2022	—	—	—N/a	PRIENDS OST
"My Loneliness Calls You" (나의 외로움이 널 부를 때)	2022	—	—	—N/a	Tomorrow OST
"Drive Away"	2022	—	—	—N/a	Webtoon ‘Marriage Instead of Death’ x SURAN
"Fantasy"	2022	—	—	—N/a	Kiss Sixth Sense OST
"RUSH"	2022	—	—	—N/a	GENE_SIS OST : C_OP
"The Queen"	2022	—	—	—N/a	Cleaning Up OST
"LET U GO"	2022	—	—	—N/a	If You Wish Upon Me OST
"The Whisper Of Forest"	2022	—	—	—N/a	The Glory OST
Promotional singles
"A Pleasant Meal" (즐거운 식탁) (Note: Released as a promotional single for the Yogiyo Korean BBQ delivery app.)	2018	—	—	—N/a	Non-album singles
"Relax Moment" (Note: Released as a promotional single for "Kumiho Relax Beer" from handmade beer company KABREW.)	2020	—	—	—N/a	Non-album singles
"—" denotes releases that did not chart.

== Awards and nominations ==
Year	Award	Category	Nominated work	Result	Ref.
2017	19th Mnet Asian Music Awards	Best Vocal Performance – Female	"Wine" (오늘 취하면) prod. Suga feat. Changmo	Nominated	
2017	9th Melon Music Awards	Song of the Year	"Wine" (오늘 취하면) prod. Suga feat. Changmo	Nominated	
2017	9th Melon Music Awards	R&B/Soul	"Wine" (오늘 취하면) prod. Suga feat. Changmo	Won	
2017	9th Melon Music Awards	Hot Trend Award (with BTS's Suga)	"Wine" (오늘 취하면) prod. Suga feat. Changmo	Won	
2018	32nd Golden Disc Awards	Digital Bonsang	"Wine" (오늘 취하면) prod. Suga feat. Changmo	Nominated	
2018	32nd Golden Disc Awards	Best R&B/Soul	"Wine" (오늘 취하면) prod. Suga feat. Changmo	Won	
2018	32nd Golden Disc Awards	Global Popularity Award	—N/a	Nominated	
2018	27th Seoul Music Awards	Bonsang Award	—N/a	Nominated	
2018	27th Seoul Music Awards	R&B/Ballad Award	—N/a	Won	
2018	27th Seoul Music Awards	Popularity Award	—N/a	Nominated	
2018	27th Seoul Music Awards	Hallyu Special Award	—N/a	Nominated	
2018	7th Gaon Chart Music Awards	Song of the Year – April	"Wine" (오늘 취하면) prod. Suga feat. Changmo	Nominated	
