= MFBTY =

- Origin: South Korea
- Genres: K-pop, hip hop
- Years active: 2013-present
- Labels: Feel Ghood Music
- Website: www.dt-love.co.kr

MFBTY, an acronym that stands for "My Fans [Are] Better Than Yours," is a Korean hip-hop group under Feel Ghood Music consisting of Tiger JK, Yoon Mi-rae, and Bizzy. They debuted in 2013 with the single, "Sweet Dream." MFBTY was meant to be only a temporary name, and the trio released an album later that year as Drunken Tiger, Tiger JK's legendary hip hop group. However, they later returned to the name MFBTY and released their first full-length album under that name in 2015.

== History ==
=== 2011–2012 ===
MFBTY started as a joke mentioned by Drunken Tiger/Tiger JK on his Twitter account. In 2011, he revealed that the pseudonym stood for “My Fans (are) Better Than Yours.” JK made a reference that his fans lived in a special type of blissful Wonderland, a reference to the book, Alice In Wonderland. The joke ringed popular with his English speaking fans, which spurred a number of cult following Twitter accounts. Up until this time, the acts had recorded multiple songs for solo albums that they never released. However, they had performed as a trio for six years. They realized that they felt most comfortable performing as a group, so decided to rebrand themselves as a 3-person project group known as MFBTY.

=== 2013 ===
In January 2013, MFBTY debuted with their digital mini album, “Sweet Dream.” While the video is known for its visuals, it is also filled with Easter eggs referring to Tiger JK’s jokes with his MFBTY and DT fanbase. For example, Tiger JK is dressed as the Mad Hatter from Alice In Wonderland. The word, “Jaguatirica (meaning Ocelot, a type of wild cat),” appears in the background of one scene. This word refers to Drunken Tiger’s Brazilian following, who gave him the name. “Sweet Dream” also marked the debut of their new DJ, DJ Smells, and their visual effects director, Lumpens. Thanks to the strengthened combination of Tiger JK’s, Yoon MiRae’s, and Bizzy’s fanbases, "Sweet Dream" rose to #1 on Korean music charts, Naver, Soribada, and others within days. The group was invited to perform at the Cannes MIDEM music festival to represent South Korea.

=== Creation of Feel Ghood Music/Rebranding as Drunken Tiger ===
In July 2013, MFBTY left their Jungle Entertainment and formed their own label, Feel Ghood Music (FGM). Their official reasons for leaving have never been disclosed. However, the members stated they favored a less conventional business set up, hiring a small team consisting of trusted friends and family for their new label.

During this time, Tiger JK’s father, Suh Byung Hoo, was diagnosed with stage 3 lung cancer. Given his condition and the label’s start up costs, the trio quickly released an album in September 2013 under Tiger’s formal stage name, Drunken Tiger. The album titled, “The Cure,” took a softer tone than previous Drunken Tiger albums. Though its hopeful message was inspired by his father and Tiger’s personal struggles, the album was dedicated to all those enduring emotional and physical hardships. The album claimed 6/10 top spots on Korea's leading digital download site, Bugs.

In November 2013, the group did their first official international concert as part of renowned Asian-American talent showcase, Kollaboration Star. They delivered a full 2-hour set, featuring songs from their solo albums and songs as MFBTY. Their Kollaboration performance caught the attention of international news media, including a booked interview with American music channel, FuseTV.

The group collaborated with Korean beauty icon, Lee Hyori, for the 2013 MBC Gayo Daejejeon, doing a melody of Lee's "Miss Korea" and MFBTY's/Drunken Tiger's single, "The Cure." This was, however, the last performance before the group went on hiatus for 2014.

=== 2014 ===
The group went on performance hiatus for most of 2014, primarily after the death of Tiger JK’s father on February 1, 2014. They released a single in May 2014 with a new artist, Yuna Kim, called “Without You Now.” The three members also released individual features and singles for soundtracks, but remained off stage until August 2014 for the Crazy Korea Concert.

=== Rebranding as YoonMiRae ft. Tiger JK & Bizzy ===
In December 2014, the group reformed under YoonMiRae's name, and will continue to play with the name orders going forward (i.e. Bizzy ft. Tiger JK & YoonMiRae, Drunken Tiger ft. Bizzy & YoonMiRae, etc.). Their digital single, "Angel," hit number 1 on 4 major Korean music charts in under 24 hours.

=== Full Length Album Release ===
MFBTY released their own album on March 19, 2015. Prior to the release, they released a full-length music video for song, "Bucku Bucku/ShyShy," as an album teaser. It featured BTS’ RM (credited as Rap Monster). On March 19, 2015 MFBTY released the album, "Wondaland," with 3 lead singles, "Bang Diggy Bang Bang," "Make It Last," and "Hello Happy." "Bang Diggy Bang Bang" currently is the only one with a music video out of the three.

== Discography ==
=== Studio albums ===
Title	Album details	Peak chart positions	Sales
Title	Album details	KOR	Sales
Wondaland	Released: March 19, 2015; Label: Feel Ghood Music; Formats: CD, digital download	10	KOR: 2,482

=== Extended plays ===
Title	Album details	Peak chart positions	Sales
Title	Album details	KOR	Sales
Dream Catcher	Released: November 10, 2019; Label: Feel Ghood Music; Formats: CD, digital download	—	—

=== Singles ===
Title	Year	Peak chart positions	Sales	Album
Title	Year	KOR	Sales	Album
"Sweet Dream"	2013	14	KOR: 247,742	Sweet Dream single album
"Hello Happy" feat. You Hee-yeol	2015	32	KOR: 93,338	Wondaland
"Bang Diggy Bang Bang" (방뛰기방방)	2015	49	KOR: 75,511	Wondaland
"Dream Catcher" (안된다고 해도 될때까지해)	2019	—	—	Dream Catcher
