= Twlv =

South Korean singer-songwriter and record producer

twlv
- Birth name: Jo Hyun-soo
- Born: September 29, 1993 (age 31); Cheongju, South Korea
- Genres: R&B; hip hop; house
- Occupations: Singer-songwriter; record producer
- Instrument: Vocals
- Years active: 2017–present
- Labels: Yng & Rich, The Tilde
- Website: Official website

Korean name
- Hangul: 조현수
- RR: Jo Hyeonsu
- MR: Cho Hyŏnsu

Jo Hyun-soo (Korean: 조현수; born September 29, 1993), better known by his stage name twlv (트웰브, pronounced "twelve"), is a South Korean singer-songwriter and record producer. He began his music career by uploading songs onto music sharing website SoundCloud and collaborating with rapper Superbee. twlv released his solo mini-album Contents ½ in 2018 and competed on SBS TV's survival program The Fan. He signed with Yng & Rich Records the following year and has released several records, including his first studio album K.I.S.S (2020).

== Early life and career beginnings ==
twlv was born Jo Hyun-soo on September 29, 1993, in Cheongju, North Chungcheong Province. He attended Korea National University of Transportation in Chungju and graduated from the Department of Aeronautical & Mechanical Design Engineering. He completed his mandatory military service and began working on music upon his return. He began uploading song recordings and a mixtape entitled Nobody (2018) onto sharing website SoundCloud under the stage name Twelve. He then altered his name by omitting the vowels and continued as twlv. He reached out to rapper Superbee via a direct message and asked him to listen to his songs, resulting in the two working together.

== Career ==
On June 1, 2018, Superbee and twlv released the OrO-produced single "Ladies Love Dogs" featuring Jindotgae. Thematically revolving around the story of two young friends who suddenly become wealthy, the pair jointly released the project albums Moolood Gang Tape and Moolood Gang Tape II through the label Ghood Life Crew on June 15 and 29, respectively. In contrast to the trap music of his collaborative works, twlv released his debut solo EP Contents ½ and its synth-pop lead single "Bodytalk" on August 5. He was introduced as an R&B vocalist by Superbee and Dok2 on SBS TV's survival program The Fan, where he contended to accumulate the most votes and viral aggregates to win the competition. He sang a rendition of G.Soul's "You" on the second episode of the series, which garnered him positive reception from the Fan Masters. twlv earned 264 points out of 300, the highest of the episode, which allowed him to progress into the second round. He faced off against singers Youra and O.When and defeated them both by earning 250 points after performing "Bodytalk". twlv advanced into the top five and performed Taeyeon's "I" in a one-on-one battle against Yongzoo, but was eliminated upon scoring 113 points to the latter's 172 points.

On February 11, 2019, Yng & Rich Records announced that twlv had signed with the agency. He released the mini-album Blueline the following month, which included two live versions of songs he performed on The Fan and a guest feature by the show's runner-up Bibi. twlv produced his record label's first group single entitled "Golf Wang" released on July 15, where he joined Superbee and Uneducated Kid on the track. twlv released his first studio album K.I.S.S on January 18, 2020. He collaborated with rapper Tiger JK on "Censored Love Song" and its uncensored version "Kiss Kiss Bang Bang". The lyrics express the frustration of social distancing amid the COVID-19 pandemic and the single's proceeds were donated to fight the disease. twlv took part in Chancellor's "Automatic" along with Babylon, Moon, Bibi, and Jiselle, and the project single was released on October 14. A remix including 28 R&B guest singers was issued the following month.

On April 15, 2021, The Tilde Entertainment announced that twlv had signed an exclusive contract with the agency. He released the two-track single Echoes headed by "Rewind" on April 27.

== Musical style ==
twlv produces R&B, hip hop, and house music with the intention of "having fun and making money". Mass appeal drives his musical direction; he believes songs should be easy to listen to and possess relatable lyrics to sing along with. Music website Rhythmer classified him as among the few domestic singers who possess "hip-hop vocals".

== Discography ==
=== Albums ===
==== Studio albums ====
Title	Details
K.I.S.S	Released: January 18, 2020; Label: Yng & Rich, Kakao M; Format: CD, digital download
YDP	Released: December 19, 2022; Label: The Tilde, Dreamus; Format: CD, digital download
Diminished	Released: April 19, 2024; Label: The Tilde, Dreamus; Format: CD, digital download

==== Extended plays ====
Title	Details
Moolood Gang Tape (벼락부자애들; Byeorak Bujaaedeul) (with Superbee)	Released: June 15, 2018; Label: Ghood Life Crew, Stone Music, Genie Music; Format: Digital download
Moolood Gang Tape II (벼락부자애들 II; Byeorak Bujaaedeul II) (with Superbee)	Released: June 29, 2018; Label: Ghood Life Crew, Stone Music, Genie Music; Format: Digital download
Contents ½	Released: August 5, 2018; Label: Ghood Life Crew, Kakao M; Format: Digital download
Blueline	Released: March 15, 2019; Label: The Five Cultural Industrial Company, Yng & Rich, Kakao M; Format: Digital download
Antiformal	Released: August 11, 2020; Label: Yng & Rich, Kakao M; Format: Digital download
Neo Seoul	Released: May 12, 2022; Label: The Tilde, Passport Seoul, Dreamus; Format: CD, Digital download

==== Mixtapes ====
Title	Details
Nobody	Released: March 3, 2018; Format: Streaming

=== Singles ===
==== As lead artist ====
Title	Year	Peak chart positions		Album
Title	Year	KOR		Album
Title	Year	Gaon Digital Chart	K-pop Hot 100	Album
"Ladies Love Dogs" (여자들은 강아지를 좋아해; Yeojadeureun Gangajireul Joahae) (with Superbee featuring Jindotgae)	2018	—	—	Non-album single
"Shinhan Bank" (신한은행; Sinhan Eunhaeng) (with Superbee)	2018	—	—	Moolood Gang Tape
"earl-see-goo" (얼씨구; Eolssigu) (with Superbee)	2018	—	—	Moolood Gang Tape II
"Bodytalk"	2018	—	—	Contents ½
"Where You From"	2018	—	—	Non-album single
"In the Room"	2019	—	—	Blueline
"Golf Wang" (골프왕; Golpeu Wang) (with Superbee and Uneducated Kid)	2019	—	—	Non-album single
"8282" (featuring Superbee and Uneducated Kid)	2019	—	—	Non-album single
"Girls" (덤벼대; Deombyeodae)	2020	—	—	K.I.S.S
"California"	2020	—	—	K.I.S.S
"Take It Easy"	2020	—	—	Non-album single
"Yang-Ah-Chi" (양아치; Yangachi) (with Superbee, Uneducated Kid, and Yuzion)	2020	—	—	Non-album single
"trotrap" (트로트랩; Teuroteu Raep) (with Superbee, Uneducated Kid, and Yuzion)	2020	113	99	Non-album single
"Summer!" (with Superbee, Uneducated Kid, and Yuzion)	2020	—	—	Non-album single
"Twerking" (트월킹; Teuwolking) (with Ravi)	2020	—	—	Non-album single
"Highway"	2020	—	—	Antiformal
"Automatic" (with Chancellor, Babylon, Moon, Bibi, and Jiselle)	2020	—	—	Non-album single
"Automatic Remix" (with Chancellor, Jay Park, Lee Hi, Bibi, Jamie, Moon, Bumkey, Samuel Seo, Suran, Babylon, Hoody, Sumin, MRSHLL, Ann One, Elo, oceanfromtheblue, Jiselle, Sole, Thama, K.vsh, Jinbo, Jerd, Soovi, B.E.D., Xydo, Owell Mood, and None)	2020	—	—	Non-album single
"Press!" (with Horse-King)	2020	—	—	Non-album single
"Rewind" (다신, 너에게; Dasin, Neoege)	2021	—	—	Echoes
"All In"	2021	—	—	Non-album single
"Dear Santa"	2021	—	—	Non-album single
"Excuses"	2022	—	—	Neo Seoul
"Playboy"	2022	—	—	Neo Seoul
"Hugs & Loyalty" (꽉; Kkwak) (featuring Reddy, IV, Owell Mood)	2022	—	—	Non-album single
"YDP" (동네; Dongne) (featuring packxday)	2022	—	—	YDP
"twlv" (시비; Sibi)	2022	—	—	YDP
"Like a Miracle" (찰나의 기적처럼; Challaui Gijeokcheoreom)	2023	—	—	Non-album single
"F.W.B." (Audiosfrom with twlv)	2023	—	—	Audiosfrom Part 1
"Tonite"	2023	—	—	Non-album single
"Serenade"	2023	—	—	Non-album single
"Island" (featuring Reddy)	2023	—	—	Non-album single
"Honeymoon"	2023	—	—	Non-album single
"F.W.B. (English Ver.)"	2023	—	—	Non-album single
"Yes" (featuring Jay Park and Reddy)	2024	—	—	Diminished
"All I Know" (Ted Park with twlv)	2024	—	—	Summer in LA
"Unconditional"	2024	—	—	Non-album single
"Do I?"	2025	—	—	Non-album single

==== As featured artist ====
Title	Year	Album
"Take It Slow" (편하게; Pyeonhage) (Royce featuring twlv)	2018	Non-album single
"Wavy-!" (Anonymous Artists featuring twlv)	2018	Non-album single
"Alone" (편해졌어; Pyeonhaejeosseo) (Kodi Green featuring twlv and Bambi)	2018	I M A G E
"Turn On the Light" (Ravi featuring twlv)	2019	Limitless Part.2
"Censored Love Song" (심의에 걸리는 사랑노래; Simuie Geollineun Sarang Norae) (Tiger JK featuring twlv)	2020	Non-album single
"Architecture" (건축학개론; Geonchukhakgaeron) (Oh Dam-ryul featuring twlv)	2020	Non-album single
"Leave" (떠나가; Tteonaga) (Meloh featuring twlv)	2021	Meloh
"Not U" (더; Deo) (Lovo Verdi featuring twlv)	2021	Still Howlin'
"Lounge" (Junhee featuring twlv)	2021	Non-album single
"One for the Old School" (James An featuring twlv)	2022	Non-album single
"Make It Up" (Pluma featuring twlv)	2022	Non-album single
"Zumo Remix" (주모 리믹스; Jumo Rimikseu) (Rhythm Power featuring Exciting Wind Lee Park-sa, Roh Yoon-ha, Tak (Baechigi), Loopy, Don Mills, 27Ring, Park Jong-yoon, D-Hack, Puff Daehee, toigo, Liv of Irris, kaogaii, Layone, twlv, NY Baby, Lee Star)	2022	Non-album single
"Morning Till Night" (En featuring twlv)	2023	Non-album single
"Angel" (Yoonsoyoung featuring twlv)	2024	Non-album single
"Like a Second Life" (인생 2회차인 것처럼; Insaeng 2-hoichain Geotcheoreom) (Crucial Star featuring twlv)	2024	Heron

=== Guest appearances ===
Title	Year	Other performer(s)	Release
"Falling Star"	2017	Ager	Memories
"Lacks from You"	2018	Bloody Web	A Lack of Love from You
"Guilty" (죽일 놈; Jugil Nom)	2019	—	The Fan Top5
"I Go Flex"	2020	Superbee, Meloh	Rap Legend 2
"Kiss Kiss Bang Bang"	2020	Tiger JK	Non-album single
"Clyde"	2021	SWRY	A Trace
"Stay" (가지마; Gajima)	2022	D.Ark	End of Puberty
"Jazz Bar"	2023	Babylon	Mood

=== Soundtrack appearances ===
Title	Year	Release
"Deep End"	2022	Bad Prosecutor OST
"Knock Down the Giants"	2023	Arthdal Chronicles: The Sword of Aramoon OST

== Filmography ==
Television series
Title	Year	Role	Ref.
The Fan	2019	Contestant	
Flex Zone	2019	Cast member	
Yng&Rich	2020	Cast member	
