= Samuel Seo =

South Korean singer and rapper

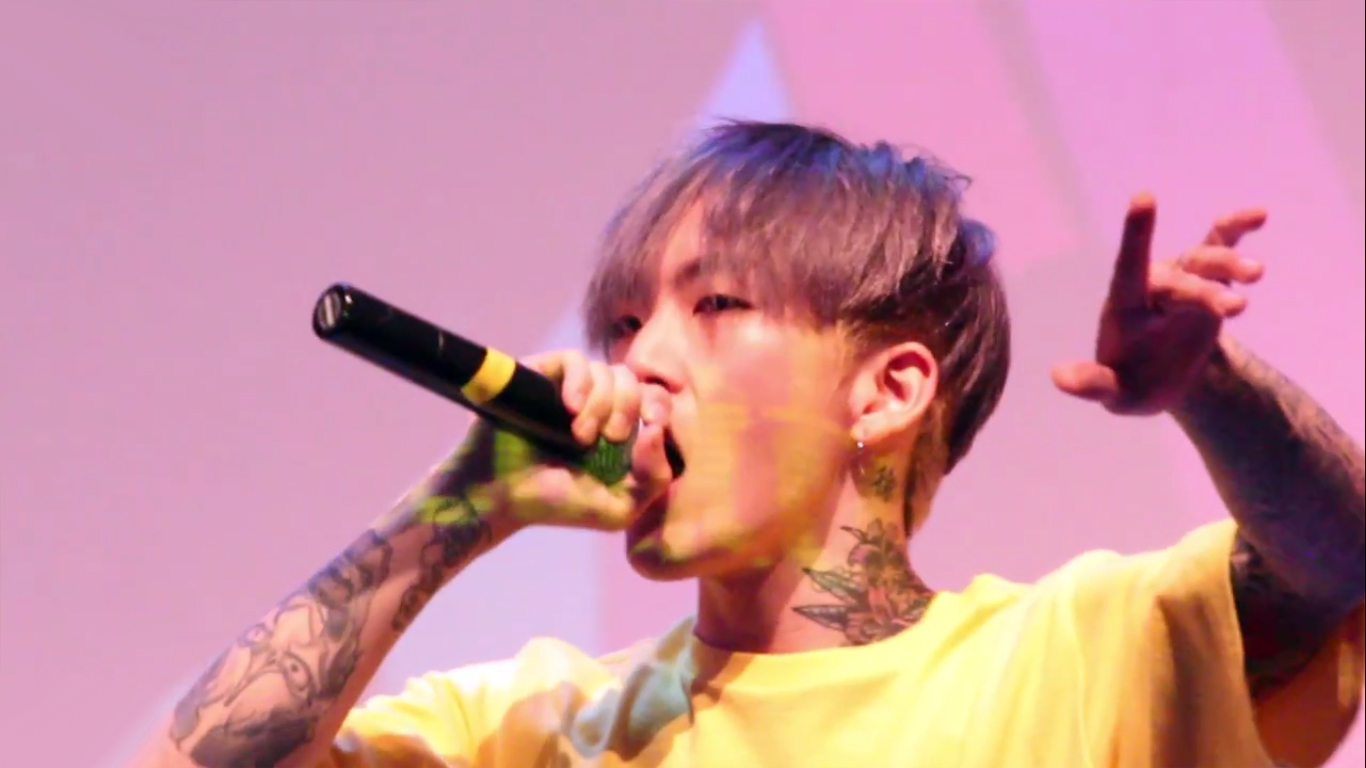
- Seo at the K-Pop World Festival 2016
- Born: May 3, 1991 (age 35); Seoul, South Korea
- Occupations: Singer-songwriter; rapper; record producer
- Years active: 2010–present
- Musical career
- Also known as: Samuel
- Genres: Hip hop; R&B; electronica
- Instruments: Singing; rapping; keyboard; piano
- Labels: Bigdeal Records; Broadway; Craft and Jun; Stoneship; Magic Strawberry Sound
- Website: msbsound.com

Korean name
- Hangul: 서사무엘
- RR: Seo Samuel
- MR: Sŏ Samuel

Samuel Seo (Korean: 서사무엘; born May 3, 1991) is a South Korean singer-songwriter, rapper, and record producer. Born in Seoul, he spent his youth living in his home country, as well as Japan, the United States, and Canada. An aspiring pianist, Seo's exposure to hip hop music in his teens led him to pursue the genre. He released a series of singles before enlisting and serving two years in military service.

Seo released his first studio album Frameworks (2015), which earned him the award for Best R&B & Soul Album at the Korean Music Awards in 2016. He released his second album Ego Expand (100%) in May of that year, which earned him nominations for Best R&B & Soul Album, as well as Best R&B & Soul Song for its lead single "B L U E". As a solo artist, Seo released one of his most recent albums, "My Body and My Heart", which garnered awards for Best R&B and Soul Album. This was followed by a new release of his third album, the fourth volume of his book Eros, which garnered an award for Best Book.

== Life and career ==
=== 1991–2012: Early life and career beginnings ===
Samuel Seo was born Seo Dong-hyeon on May 3, 1991, in Seoul, South Korea. He began to learn to play the piano between the ages of four and five. His father, who worked for the Japanese company Hitachi at the time, was transferred to Tokyo; this resulted in Seo and his family moving to Japan at the age of five. He was enrolled in kindergarten there, where he spent the following two to three years in the country and learned to speak Japanese. Throughout his remaining youth and adolescence, he lived in the United States and Canada. He learned English in the former between visiting family and studying at a community center. He attended and graduated middle school in Canada, where he sought to become a lawyer.

Upon returning to South Korea to attend high school, Seo began to focus on becoming a pianist. While exploring his university options, he entered a club and heard "Outta Control" by American rapper 50 Cent, his first experience with hip hop music. Impressed by the genre, the exposure led him to pursue it. He came across Bigdeal's "Deal with Us", his first time listening to Korean hip hop. During this time period, the Bigdeal Squads collective was holding auditions; after successfully auditioning, Seo was signed to the record label in 2008 and became part of the collective. Unsatisfied with his given birth name, Seo chose his stage name after the biblical Samuel: "His words became truths and people took them as sacred. I liked that position. I mean, not sacred, but I hope people hear my words seriously." In spite of his name, he identifies as irreligious. Encompassing ambient, electronic, and new-age music, Seo released his first single "Raindrop" in 2010. The following year, he released his first mixtape Now or Never before being subject to conscription in South Korea and enlisting in military service.

=== 2013–2016: Frameworks and Ego Expand (100%) ===
Seo completed his military service and was discharged in 2013. A member of the New Block Babyz and Guereallaz collectives, he released his debut extended play Welcome to My Zone in October of that year. The singles "Vibe" and "Ocean of You" followed in the subsequent months. After a year and a half hiatus, Seo released "New Dress Girl" on September 14, 2015, in precedence of his first full-length album. Contributing to the songwriting, composing, and arrangement on the record, as well as playing all instruments with the exception of bass, Frameworks was released on October 2. The album earned Seo the award for Best R&B & Soul Album at the 13th annual Korean Music Awards.

Seo released the digital single "Kafka" on February 17, 2016. Influenced by Franz Kafka's novel The Metamorphosis, the song is a collaboration with rapper Verbal Jint. He released his second studio album Ego Expand (100%), along with its lead single "B L U E" on May 27. After holding a showcase for the album, he embarked on his first series of concert tours in Asia. On October 28, he released the post-album single "Float" featuring C Jamm. Seo was nominated for Best R&B & Soul Album and Song, respectively, for the 14th Korean Music Awards for Ego Expand (100%) and "B L U E".

=== 2017–present: Collaborative works ===
Seo released a collaboration single with former 4Minute member Jeon Ji-yoon in March 2017. On June 8, he released the collaborative project extended play Elbow with Qim Isle.

== Artistry ==
Due to his extensive involvement in his music, Seo has been referred to as a "genius artist". In addition to singing and rapping, he contributes to the songwriting, composition, arrangement, and production of his material. He also incorporates various genres into his work, including R&B, soul, hip hop, funk, electronica, and synthpop. He has been complimented on his "unique style".

== Discography ==
=== Albums ===
==== Studio albums ====
| Title | Album details | Peak chart positions | Sales |
| Title | Album details | Gaon Album Chart | Sales |
|---|---|---|---|
| Frameworks | Released: October 2, 2015; Label: Craft and Jun, Stoneship; Format: CD, digital download | 94 | |
| Ego Expand (100%) | Released: May 27, 2016; Label: Craft and Jun, Stoneship; Format: CD, digital download | 49 | KOR: 364 |
| Unity | Released: September 12, 2018; Label: Stone Music Entertainment; Format: CD, digital download | 69 | |
| The Misfit | Released: October 31, 2019; Label: Magic Strawberry Sound; Format: CD, digital download, LP | 70 | |

==== Extended plays ====
| Title | Album details |
|---|---|
| Welcome to My Zone | Released: October 22, 2013; Label: Broadway; Format: CD, digital download |
| Elbow (with Qim Isle) | Released: June 8, 2017; Label: Craft and Jun; Format: CD, digital download |
| D I A L | Released: May 11, 2020; Label: Magic Strawberry Sound; Format: digital download |
| Unity II | Released: October 21, 2020; Label: Magic Strawberry Sound; Format: digital download |

=== Singles ===
==== As lead artist ====
| Title | Year | Peak chart positions | Sales | Release |
| Title | Year | Gaon Digital Chart | Sales | Release |
|---|---|---|---|---|
| "Raindrops" | 2010 | — | | "Raindrop" |
| "Tonite" (with Gray) | 2011 | — | | Non-album single |
| "When You Need Me" (with Daniel Star) | 2011 | — | | Non-album single |
| "Just Say Yes" | 2011 | — | | Non-album single |
| "The Pink Room (Bubble Gum)" (featuring 2Tak) | 2013 | — | | Welcome to My Zone |
| "C.U.I.O (Count Until It's Over)" (with High Flies, Dok2, Skyzoo, and Ugly Duck) | 2013 | — | | Non-album single |
| "Vibe" | 2013 | — | | Non-album single |
| "Ocean of You" | 2014 | — | | Non-album single |
| "New Dress Girl" | 2015 | — | | Frameworks |
| "Make Up Love" | 2015 | — | | Frameworks |
| "G O Y O" | 2015 | — | | Frameworks |
| "Kafka" (featuring Verbal Jint) | 2016 | — | | Non-album single |
| "B L U E" | 2016 | — | | Ego Expand (100%) |
| "Sandwich" (featuring Jung-in) | 2016 | — | | Ego Expand (100%) |
| "S W I R L (Onstage Ver.)" | 2016 | — | | Non-album single |
| "Float" (featuring C Jamm) | 2016 | — | | Non-album single |
| "Entourage" | 2016 | — | | Entourage Mixtape |
| "Cavalia" (카발리아; Kaballia) (with Bong Tae-gyu and Raw by Peppers) | 2016 | — | | Sing Street |
| "Window" (창문; Changmun) | 2016 | — | | Non-album single |
| "Cliche" (with Jeon Ji-yoon) | 2017 | — | | Non-album single |
| "Incheon Port of Farewell" (이별의 인천항; Ibyeoleui Incheonhang) | 2017 | — | | Incheon – Sound of Incheon (Part 1) |
| "Off You" | 2017 | — | | Non-album single |
| "greengreengreen" | 2018 | — | | Sum (Sum∞) Eighth Greenplugged Official Omnibus Album |
| "G O Y O 2018" (고요 2018; Goyo 2018) (featuring Nucksal) | 2018 | — | | Breakers Part.1 |
| "5am" (다섯시; Daseotsi) | 2018 | — | | Breakers Part.4 |
| "Jazz in My" | 2018 | — | | Unity |
| "Happy Avocado" | 2018 | — | | Unity |
| "I Hate Holidays" | 2019 | — | | Non-album single |
| "Cruise" (비가 그쳤네; Biga Geuchyeotne) | 2019 | — | | Non-album single |
| "D O W E" | 2019 | — | | Non-album single |
| "Jungle Riot" | 2019 | — | | Non-album single |
| "Let Us Talk" | 2020 | — | | Non-album single |
| "Let Us Talk (Bedroom Version)" | 2020 | — | | Non-album single |
| "Gae Na Ri" (개나리; Gaenari) | 2020 | — | | D I A L |
| "Soon" (with Eden) | 2020 | — | | Eden_Stardust2 vol.01 |
| "Cycle" (굴레; Gullae) | 2020 | — | | Unity II |
| "Cloud" (운; Un) | 2020 | — | | Unity II |
| "Automatic Remix" (with Chancellor, Jay Park, Lee Hi, Bibi, Jamie, Moon, Bumkey, Suran, Babylon, Hoody, Sumin, MRSHLL, Ann One, Elo, twlv, oceanfromtheblue, Jiselle, Sole, Thama, K.vsh, Jinbo, Jerd, Soovi, B.E.D., Xydo, Owell Mood, and None) | 2020 | — | | Non-album single |
"—" denotes releases that did not chart or were not released in that region.

==== As featured artist ====
| Title | Year | Peak chart positions | Sales | Release |
| Title | Year | Gaon Digital Chart | Sales | Release |
|---|---|---|---|---|
| "Slide to Unlock" (밀어서 잠금해제; Mireoseo Jamgeumhaeje) (Kruxx Beatz featuring Samuel Seo and Shin Ho-rim) | 2013 | — | | Non-album single |
| "Young & Great" (청춘; Cheongchun) (Qwala featuring Zizo and Samuel Seo) | 2013 | — | | Young & Great |
| "The Monster" (2Tak in Quantize featuring Outsider and Samuel Seo) | 2013 | — | | Before Christ |
| "I Didn't Know Breaking Up Could Be This Easy" (쉽게 헤어질줄 몰랐어; Swipge Heeojiljeul Mollasseo) (Sang Ji featuring Samuel Seo) | 2014 | — | | "Jkey Project Vol.01" |
| "A Dream" (Damian Kang featuring Samuel Seo) | 2014 | — | | Non-album single |
| "Think Twice" (Cielo featuring Samuel Seo) | 2014 | — | | Non-album single |
| "Dancehall Where the Demons Dance" (악마들이 춤 추는 댄스홀; Angmadeuri Chum Chuneun Daenseuhol) (Nucksal featuring Samuel Seo) | 2014 | — | | Non-album single |
| "Everything and More Remix" (RiLord featuring Samuel Seo) | 2014 | — | | Non-album single |
| "E.B.I.T (Every Breath I Take)" (MGFC featuring Samuel Seo) | 2014 | — | | Non-album single |
| "Dot Uh" (Rawyall featuring Samuel Seo) | 2014 | — | | Non-album single |
| "Tell Ya" (Young Jay featuring Samuel Seo) | 2014 | — | | Non-album single |
| "The Crow" (Jinsol featuring Penomeco, Dowby, and Samuel Seo) | 2014 | — | | Non-album single |
| "L O V E A S O N G" (Mushland featuring Samuel Seo) | 2014 | — | | Cohail Dream |
| "P.A.P.E.R" (Qwala featuring Loco and Samuel Seo) | 2014 | — | | Monsta Truck 2014 |
| "Red-Colored Night" (붉은 빛깔의 밤; Bulgeun Bitkkareun Bam) (Still PM featuring Samuel Seo) | 2014 | — | | Non-album single |
| "Le Mans" (르망; Leumang) (Jayho featuring Samuel Seo) | 2016 | — | | Le Mans |
| "Fatalism" (운명론; Unmyeongnon) (Jang Hye-jin featuring Samuel Seo) | 2016 | — | | Ordinary |
| "Home" (집; Jip) (H2ADIN featuring Samuel Seo and Nucksal) | 2017 | — | KOR: 16,905 | High School Rapper Final |
| "Why, You?" (넌 왜?; Neon Wae?) (Park Bo-ram featuring Samuel Seo) | 2017 | — | | Orange Moon |
| "Sweet" (OLNL featuring Samuel Seo) | 2018 | — | | All Available |
| "WTF" (뭐다냐; Mwodanya) (AshRock featuring Samuel Seo) | 2018 | — | | Kenzasburg |
| "I" (OLNL featuring Samuel Seo) | 2018 | — | | Show Me the Money 777 Semi-final |
| "TTL" (Cadejo featuring Samuel Seo) | 2018 | — | | Non-album single |
| "Ding Dong Ditch" (벨튀; Beltwi) (Gree featuring Samuel Seo, Gaeun) | 2019 | — | | Vague |
| "Lonely Boy" (Damye featuring Samuel Seo) | 2019 | — | | Non-album single |
| "Moonlighting" (P-Type featuring Samuel Seo) | 2019 | — | | Non-album single |
"—" denotes releases that did not chart or were not released in that region.

=== Soundtrack appearances ===
| Title | Year | Release | Ref. |
|---|---|---|---|
| "Slowly but Surely" (티 내볼게; Ti Naebolge) (Minsu, Samuel Seo) | 2019 | I'm Not a Robot OST Part 1 | |
| "Pain or Death" | 2019 | Doctor John OST Part 4 | |

=== Guest appearances ===
List of non-single guest appearances, with other performing artists, showing year released and album name
| Title | Year | Other performer(s) | Release | Ref. |
|---|---|---|---|---|
| "B.B.B (Remix)" | 2013 | Jayho, Nucksal | "American Girl" | |
| "Triple Double" | 2013 | Young Jay, Jayho, Nucksal, Qwala, New Champ | No Stress, No Drama | |
| "Who Are You" (누구냐 너; Nugunya Neo) | 2013 | Issac Squab | Hotspicyradio : Spicyflava (2/2) | |
| "Just Celebrate" | 2013 | Prizmoliq | Spirit of the Times | |
| "Doping Test" | 2013 | 2Tak in Quantize, New Champ, KittiB, Koonta, Innovator, Jung Moon | Before Christ | |
| "Finale2013" | 2013 | Scotch VIP, Roydo, KittiB | "Day n' Night" | |
| "Lightly" (가볍게; Gabyeopge) | 2014 | New Champ | Sound Providers of Korea | |
| "187" | 2014 | Vasco | Code Name :187 | |
| "Oppa" (오빠) | 2014 | All That | Trilogy | |
| "Shoulder Gang" (어깨깡패; Ekkaekkangpae) | 2014 | Don Mills | Young Don | |
| "Shall We Dance" | 2014 | Riby-J | Collabo No. 1 – Livin' in da Keywest | |
| "F.O.M" | 2014 | Mushland, Cielo | Cohail Dream | |
| "Cohail Dream" | 2014 | Mushland, Cielo | Cohail Dream | |
| "Her in the Mirror" (거울안의 그녀; Geouraneui Genyeo) | 2015 | JJK | Noble Collision | |
| "Sky Walker" | 2015 | Brasco | Divin' to Earth | |
| "Good Days" | 2016 | TK, Young Jay | Tourist | |
| "LO:OP" | 2016 | Giriboy | Mechanical Album | |
| "Natural" (내가 무슨 말을 어찌; Naega Museun Mareul Eojji; lit. '"What Do I Say"') | 2017 | Hanhae, Kang Seung-hyeon | Tribe of Hip Hop2 Final I | |
| "Music Is Difficult" (음악은 어려워; Eumageun Eoyreowo) | 2017 | Han Yo-han | The Blade Dance | |
| "On" | 2017 | Primary, George | Shininryu | |
| "Check-In" | 2018 | Reddy | Telescope | |
| "a r o m a" (내린 뒤; Naerin Dwi) | 2018 | —N/a | Breakers Part.5 | |
| "Choose" (추수; Chusu) | 2018 | Eluphant, TakeOne | U | |

== Filmography ==
=== Variety show ===
| Year | Title | Role | Notes | Ref. |
|---|---|---|---|---|
| 2020 | King of Mask Singer | Contestant | as "Manhole" (episodes 285–286) | |

== Awards and nominations ==
=== Korean Music Awards ===
| Year | Nominee / work | Award | Result | Ref. |
|---|---|---|---|---|
| 2016 | Frameworks | Best R&B & Soul Album | Won | |
| 2017 | Ego Expand (100%) | Best R&B & Soul Album | Nominated | |
| 2017 | "B L U E" | Best R&B & Soul Song | Nominated | |
| 2018 | "Off You" | Best R&B & Soul Song | Nominated | |
