= Bizzy =

South Korean rapper (born 1980)

- Also known as: Bizzionary, Suga-Free
- Born: Park Jun-young; February 29, 1980 (age 46); New Zealand
- Genre: Korean hip hop
- Occupations: Rapper, MC, Sound Engineer, DJ
- Years active: 2000–present
- Labels: Jungle Entertainment, Feel Ghood Music

Park Jun-young (Korean: 박준영; born February 29, 1980), better known as Bizzy (비지), is a New Zealand based South Korean rapper and member of the hip-hop trio MFBTY. He is an affiliate of YDG's Yucka Squad and also the hip-hop crew The Movement. He became more known when he started performing alongside Drunken Tiger member Tiger JK and later featured on Drunken Tiger's 6th album.

== Biography ==
Bizzy was born in New Zealand on February 29, 1980. At the age of 7, he moved to Washington, D.C. to live with his aunt. During his time there, he was exposed to Eastcoast hip hop via his uncle (an African-American man) and his extended family. In 1995, he attended a music school in New Zealand and applied his knowledge when he became a DJ at local clubs. He was later admitted to The School of Audio Engineering.

In 2001, he moved to South Korea and auditioned at different labels. Most offered him roles as a back up vocal and guest rapper for Korean pop groups. He refused them because it went against his goals of becoming a rapper. During this time, he met Yang Dong Gun (YDG) and became a member of his hip-hop crew, Yucka Squad. He was later inducted into hip hop crew, The Movement. Movement Crew member, Sean2Slow, observed how Bizzy would "always be busy," thus leading to his current stage name.

In 2002, he recorded his album debut song, "We Movin' In" as part of rapper, Smokie J's compilation album, "The Konexion." He became more active in Yucka Squad and acted as both a rapper and DJ for the group. When DJ Shine left from Drunken Tiger, Tiger JK of DT asked Bizzy to fill in as DJ and supporting act. Initially, Bizzy filled for DJ Shine's lyrics during performances, but later became a co-producer and feature on Drunken Tiger's 6th album. He was signed to Jungle Entertainment in 2006 and released his own EP, Bizzionary, in 2008.

In 2012, Bizzy recorded his first soundtrack song, "Nu Hero," for the drama, Hero (coincidentally starring Bizzy's old friend, YDG). Up until 2013, Bizzy was seen as a solo act that performed alongside Drunken Tiger and Yoon Mi-Rae. However, the three later decided to form the group, MFBTY. They released their digital mini album, "Sweet Dream," in January 2013.

MFBTY left their former label, Jungle Entertainment and formed new label, Feel Ghood Music, in July 2013. MFBTY was absorbed into the Drunken Tiger name in September, followed by the release of Drunken Tiger’s 9th album, "The Cure."

=== Notability as songwriter and feature artist ===
While Bizzy's mainly known as a counterpart to Drunken Tiger and MFBTY, he is also a prolific songwriter, producer and feature artist for some of Korea's best known artists. In his early career, he collaborated with Movement rapper, YDG, for YDG's first three albums. His affiliation with YDG led him to work with other Movement rappers, such as Leessang, Jungin and Bobby Kim. He has also worked with non-hip-hop acts. In 2011, he collaborated with former 2PM member, Jay Park, for the song, "휵갔어." He also collaborated with G.O.D member, Son Hoyoung, on his soundtrack single, "Pretty But Hateful 예쁘고 미웠다."

Bizzy continues to write and feature for other artists. Most recent releases include Yoon Gun’s, "Today is a Rainy Day," Kim Wan Sun’s, "Goodbye My Love," and Yuna Kim's "Without You Now."

== Discography ==
=== Collaborative albums ===
Title	Album details	Track list
살자 (The Cure)	With Drunken Tiger & Yoon Mi-rae; Released: September 13, 2013; Label: Feel Ghood Music	1. Beautiful Life; 2. 첫눈이 오면 설레였던 꼬마아이 (Time Travel); 3. 살자 (The Cure); 4. Sweet Dream; 5. BizzyTigerYoonmirae; 6. 뭉쳐 (All In Together); 7. Go; 8. Get It In (Feat. Jung In); 9. 살자 (The Cure) (Reggae Ver.)

=== EPs ===
Title	Album details	Track list
Bizzionary	Released: June 27, 2008 Label: Feel Ghood Music	1. Change (feat. YDG); 2. 그래 (춤 못 추는 사람을 위해 만든 노래); 3. All In (feat. Jinbo); 4. 헤어진 다음날 (feat. Lee Hyun-woo); 5. Day & Night (feat. Yoon Mi-rae); 6. Bam (feat. Nan-A); 7. 음악은 타임머신; 8. MOVEMENT4 (꺼지지 않는 초심)

=== Singles ===
- "검은머리 파뿌리" (feat. BUMZU) (2016)

=== As a featured artist ===
Shawty (Feat. Bizzy & J-Dogg) - dok2
One Penny - Dynamic Duo
Pretty But Hateful 예쁘고 미웠다 - 손호영
차우차우 (Feat. Bizzy) - 윤건
Set Me Free- 김준수
Am I (feat. Bizzy, B-Free)-리쌍
일터 (feat. bizzy) -리쌍
Just The Two Of Us (Feat. 이정, Bizzy) -YDG
끄더겨 (feat. Bizzy) -YDG
Chilly (Feat, Bizzy) - YDG
29 Shit (feat. Bizzy, LEO) - YDG
BURRRR Feat YDG, Bizzy YANGGNAG
그래 나를 믿자 ( City Hall 시티 홀OST ) - 정인
Coffee Break – B-FREE
오늘은 Rainy Day (Feat. Bizzy) [Album - Autumn Play] - 윤건
Smokie J - Players (Feat. 도끼,비지,더블케이,쥬비) - Smokie J
River To Ocean - 리쌍
I Need a Beat Feat. Minos, Bizzy-B, MC Meta - Nuoliance
기적 - 박정현
24/7 - Bobby Kim
휵갔어 - 박재범 (Jay Park)
술보다 못한 여자 -Leo Kekoa
죽기 전까지 날아야 하는 새 (To. Bizzy) (Feat. 강산에, Bizzy) - 리쌍
콧구멍스 (Feat. By Bizzy) - YDG
Highlight (Feat. Bizzy) - 이효리
Memory (Feat. Bizzy) -이효리
Tonight (Feat. Bizzy) -소울라임
Damn U (Feat. Bizzy B) -Double K
다시 (Feat. Bizzy)- 존박
“Without You Now” – Yuna Kim (as MFBTY member)
이유 같지 않은 이유 (Feat Bizzy) - 김경호

== Filmography ==
=== Variety shows ===
- 2020: King of Mask Singer (MBC), contestant as "Hu Jin" (episode 265)
- 2024: RAP:PUBLIC (TVING)

== Awards ==
- 2013 Eat Your Kimchi Web awards "Best Hip-Hop Music Video" – "The Cure" (as part of MFBTY/Drunken Tiger)
