= Yang Dong-geun =

South Korean actor and hip-hop artist (born 1979)

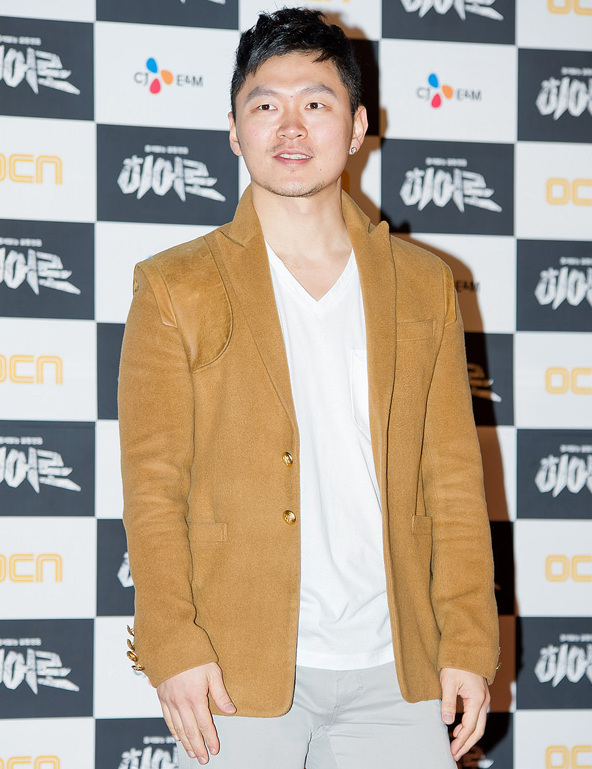
- Yang in March 2012
- Born: June 1, 1979 (age 47); Seoul, South Korea
- Other names: YDG; Dong-kun Yang
- Education: Yong in University (Theatrical Performance)
- Occupations: Actor; rapper; singer; songwriter; record producer; breakdancer
- Years active: 1986–present
- Agent: Polaris Entertainment
- Musical career
- Origin: Seoul, South Korea
- Genres: Hip hop; K-pop
- Label: Brand New Music

Korean name
- Hangul: 양동근
- Hanja: 梁東根
- RR: Yang Donggeun
- MR: Yang Tonggŭn

Yang Dong-geun (Korean: 양동근; born June 1, 1979), also known as YDG, is a South Korean actor and rapper. He started his career as a child actor, drawing attention for his roles in the television shows Seoul Ttukbaegi (1990) and Hyung (1991). He began releasing music as a rapper in 2001, establishing himself as a star of Korean hip-hop. Yang continued acting, gaining popularity for his roles in the television shows New Nonstop (2002) and Ruler of Your Own World (2002). He is best known outside of South Korea for playing Park Yong-sik in the second season of Squid Game (2024).

== Career ==
His comeback project after being discharged from the military was the film Grand Prix with Kim Tae-hee. He was cast as male lead Lee Woo-suk after Lee Joon-gi had to pull out when the Military Manpower Administration declined his application to postpone enlistment for military service.

On October 18 to November 23, 2008, he acted in the musical Mine with singer Kangta. The musical follows the true life story of Lieutenant Lee Jong-myung, who lost his legs in a land mine explosion near the demilitarized zone in June 2000, when he saved fellow soldier, Sul Dong-seob, from a minefield.

In 2016, he and his daughter Yang Joy joined as a member of KBS variety show The Return of Superman.

== Philanthropy ==
On February 8, 2023, Yang donated 10 million won to help people affected by the 2023 Turkey–Syria earthquakes, by donating money through the Embassy of Turkey in South Korea.

== Personal life ==
Yang and his wife Park Ga-ram have two sons and a daughter.

Yang majored in Theatrical Performance at Yong in University.

Yang enlisted for mandatory military service in May 2008 for 21 months of active duty.

== Filmography ==
=== Television series ===
Year	Title	Role	Network
1986	Three Families Under One Roof		MBC
1987	Tappuri		KBS
1989	Carousel		KBS1
1989	MBC Best Theater: "Crescent Moon and Night"		MBC
1990	Seoul Earthen Bowl	Jang Soo-gon	KBS
1991	Hyung (My Older Brother)	young Dong-hoon	KBS2
1992	Gwanchon Essay		SBS
1995	New Generation Report: Adults Don't Know		KBS1
1996	Three Guys and Three Girls		MBC
1999	School 1	Jo Suk-ho	KBS2
1999	Ad Madness	Hwang Dae-joo	KBS2
2000	Drama City: "He Got Off at The Train Station"		KBS2
2000	New Nonstop	Yang Dong-geun	MBC
2000	8.15 Drama: "Seongam Island"		MBC
2001	The Full Sun	Choi Dong-pal	KBS2
2002	Ruler of Your Own World	Ko Bok-su	MBC
2006	Dr. Kkang	Kang Dal-go	MBC
2007	I Am Sam	Jang Yi-san	KBS2
2012	Hero	Kim Heuk-chul	OCN
2014	The Three Musketeers	Heo Seung-po	tvN
2016	My Fair Lady	cameo	KBS2
2017	Missing 9	Yoon Tae-young	MBC
2017	The Bride of Habaek	Joo Dong	tvN
2017	Borg Mom	Choi Go-Bong	MBC
2018	The Third Charm	Lee Dong-jae	JTBC
2018	My Secret Terrius	Cha Jung-il	MBC
2020	365: Repeat the Year	Bae Jung-tae	MBC
2021	Lost	Woo-nam	JTBC
2022	Cheer Up	Bae Young-woong	SBS
2022	The Forbidden Marriage	Jo Seong-gyun	MBC

=== Web series ===
Year	Title	Role	Notes	Ref.
2021	Emergency	Doctor Yang	Medical Sitcom	
2021	Floor	independent actor	Audio drama	
2022	The King of the Desert	Dong-hyeon		
2022	Connect	musician Z		
2023	Moving	Jung Joon-hwa		
2024–2025	Squid Game	Park Yong-sik (Player 007)	Season 2 Season 3	

=== Film ===
Year	Title	Role
1991	Super Hong Gil-dong 5	Dol-yi
1992	Backpack of Memories of Hae-ryong and Dal-ja	
1998	Zzang (The Best)	Yang Jong-gu
1999	White Valentine	Han-seok
1999	Dance Dance	Soon-do
2000	Bloody Beach	Jae-seung
2001	Address Unknown	Chang-guk
2002	Bet on My Disco	Wang Seok-gi
2003	Wild Card	Bang Je-su
2004	The Last Wolf	Choi Cheol-kwon
2004	Fighter in the Wind	Choi Bae-dal
2006	Monopoly	Na Kyung-ho
2010	Grand Prix	Lee Woo-seok
2011	The Perfect Game	Sun Dong-yeol
2012	Love 911	Detective Bang Je-su (cameo)
2013	Days of Wrath	Chang-shik
2013	Rough Play	Kang Bin (cameo)
2013	Black Gospel (documentary)	himself
2020	Night of the Undead	Dr. Jang
2022	Yaksha: Ruthless Operations	Chief Hong
2025	Mantis	Gwang-cheon / Bi-cheon
TBA	Starlight Falls	Craft beer brewery owner

=== Variety shows ===
Year	Title	Role
2014	Show Me the Money 3	Producer of "Team YDG"
2016	The Return of Superman	Himself, with his children
2016	Unpretty Rapstar 3	Host
2017	Law of the Jungle in Komodo	Cast member (Episodes 274–278)
2017	King of Mask Singer	Contestant as "Columbus" (Episode 125)
2020	King of Mask Singer	Contestant as "Sergeant" (Episodes 261–262)
2021–present	Master of Life	Narrator

== Theatre ==
Year	Title	Role
2005	Offending the Audience	
2008	Mine	Kang Bong-tae
2015–2017	In the Heights	Usnavi

== Discography ==
=== Studio albums ===
Title	Album details	Peak chart positions	Sales
Title	Album details	KOR	Sales
Yangdonggeun a.k.a Madman	Released: July 27, 2001; Label: Star J; Format: CD, cassette	16	KOR: 68,209
Da Man on the Block!!	Released: May 13, 2002; Label: Star J; Format: CD	30	KOR: 17,294
Travel	Released: November 25, 2003; Label: Square One; Format: CD, cassette	12	KOR: 20,373
Mirror (거울)	Released: July 13, 2006; Label: Danal; Format: CD	—	
But I Give (But I 드려)	Released: October 22, 2007; Label: Kemical Record; Format: CD	22	KOR: 9,857
"—" denotes releases that did not chart or were not released in that region.

=== Compilation albums ===
Title	Album details	Peak chart positions
Title	Album details	KOR
Best of Best	Released: November 9, 2010; Label: Kemical Record; Format: CD, digital download	19

=== Singles ===
Title	Year	Peak chart positions	Album
Title	Year	KOR	Album
"Dog" (개키워) (2010 New Version)	2010	48	Non-album single
"Bandolier" (탄띠)	2010	76	Best of Best
"Perfect Game" (with Skull)	2011	91	Non-album singles
"Just The Two Of Us" (feat. Bizzy and Lee Jung)	2012	18	Non-album singles
"Give It to Me" (feat. Dok2 and The Quiett)	2012	—	Non-album singles
"Father"	2013	42	Non-album singles
"Jajaja" (feat. Dynamic Duo and Crush)	2014	47	Non-album singles
"Jump Down" (feat. Ivy)	2015	—	Non-album singles
"Beside Me" (with Code Kunst, Bewhy and Suran)	2016	—	Non-album singles
"Work Spirit" (작업혼) (feat. Beenzino)	2016	—	Non-album singles
"Don't Go" (feat. Hash Swan)	2016	—	Non-album singles
"Casanova" (카사노바) (feat. Babylon and Carlos)	2017	—	Non-album singles
"Then, Single?" (그럼..누님?) (with Esther Kim)	2018	—	Non-album singles
"Going Home"	2019	—	Non-album singles
"Package of Love" (사랑의 택배)	2019	—	Non-album singles
"That G" (때찌)	2021	—	Non-album singles
"Count Your Blessings" (with Dbo)	2025	—	Non-album singles
"—" denotes releases that did not chart or were not released in that region.

== Ambassadorship ==
- Public relations ambassador of the global medical volunteer group Green Doctors (2022)

== Awards and nominations ==
Year presented, name of the award ceremony, award category, nominated work and the result of the nomination
Year	Award	Category	Nominated work	Result
1991	27th Baeksang Arts Awards	Best Young Actor	Hyung	Won
1991	KBS Drama Awards	Best Young Actor	Hyung	Won
2000	MBC Entertainment Awards	Popularity Award	New Nonstop	Won
2001	21st Korean Association of Film Critics Awards	Best New Actor	Address Unknown	Won
2001	MBC Entertainment Awards	Top Excellence Award in a Sitcom	New Nonstop	Won
2002	MBC Drama Awards	Excellence Award, Actor in a Miniseries	Ruler of Your Own World	Won
2002	MBC Drama Awards	TV Actor of the Year (chosen by journalists)	Ruler of Your Own World	Won
2002	MBC Drama Awards	TV Actor of the Year (chosen by netizens)	Ruler of Your Own World	Won
2003	39th Baeksang Arts Awards	Best New Actor – Television	Ruler of Your Own World	Won
2003	1st Korea Fashion World Awards	Best Dressed, Film category	—N/a	Won
2004	27th Golden Cinematography Awards	Most Popular Actor	Wild Card	Won
2004	41st Grand Bell Awards	Best Actor	Wild Card	Nominated
2006	1st Anniversary of the Police Film Festival	Plaque of Appreciation	—N/a	Won
2009	Award from the Army Chief of Staff	Recipient	—N/a	Won
2017	MBC Entertainment Awards	Special Award in a Sitcom	Borg Mom	Won
2017	MBC Entertainment Awards	Excellence Award in a Sitcom	Borg Mom	Nominated
2020	MBC Drama Awards	Excellence Award, Actor in a Monday-Tuesday Miniseries / Short Drama	365: Repeat the Year	Nominated
2022	SBS Drama Awards	Best Supporting Actor in a Miniseries Romance/Comedy	Cheer Up	Nominated
2022	SBS Drama Awards	Best Supporting Team	Cheer Up	Won
2022	MBC Drama Awards	Best Supporting Actor	The Forbidden Marriage	Nominated
