= Feel Ghood Music =

South Korean record label

- Native name: 필굿뮤직
- Industry: Music, Entertainment
- Genre: Korean hip hop; R&B
- Founded: 2013
- Headquarters: Seoul, South Korea
- Key people: Tiger JK (founder and CEO); Yoon Mi-rae
- Services: Music production; Licensing; Publishing; Artist Management
- Website: feelghood.com/

Feel Ghood Music (Korean: 필굿뮤직) is a South Korean record label and entertainment agency founded by Tiger JK in 2013.

== History ==
Originally created in July 2013 by MFBTY to house the new group and their members (Tiger JK, Yoon Mi-rae, and Bizzy) the company Feel Ghood Music was named after Tiger JK's 8th album, Feel gHood Muzik : The 8th Wonder.

Throughout the years Feel Ghood Music has signed other artists like Junoflo, Black Nine, and MRSHLL focusing on supporting their musical expression and creating a healthy environment.

== Artists ==
=== Groups ===
- MFBTY
- Drunken Tiger

=== Soloists ===
- Tiger JK
- Bizzy (2013-2023)
- Yoon Mi-rae
- Junoflo (2016-2019)
- Ann One
- MRSHLL
- Black Nine
- Bibi

== Discography ==
Year	Title	Type	Artist
2013	The Cure (as Drunken Tiger feat. Yoon Mi-rae & Bizzy)	Album	MFBTY
2015	WondaLand	Album	MFBTY
2015	Progression	Extended play	Junoflo
2015	이런건가요 (I Know)	Mini Album	Tiger JK
2018	Drunken Tiger X: Rebirth of Tiger JK	Album	Tiger JK
2018	Breathe	Extended play	MRSHLL
2018	Only Human	Extended play	Junoflo
2019	STATUES	Album	Junoflo
