= Mrshll =

Korean-American singer

MRSHLL
- Also known as: 마샬
- Born: Marshall Bang; Orange County, California
- Label: Feel Ghood Music
- Website: msha.ke/marshall/

Marshall Bang, known professionally as MRSHLL (Korean: 마샬), is a Korean-American R&B and K-pop singer.

== Early life ==
Born and raised in a conservative Christian home in Orange County, California, Bang started developing his affinity for music and singing in church. He further explored his performing sensibilities in his high school show choir and local community theater productions. After graduating, Bang attended private Christian institution Biola University, where he began to post singing videos online such as his cover of Boyz II Men's "It's So Hard To Say Goodbye To Yesterday" that went viral. Post-college, Bang was diagnosed with laryngopharyngeal reflux, where he eventually had to quit singing and decided to enroll in cosmetology school in Los Angeles. A formative time in his life, this was when he was properly introduced to queer culture and the LGBTQIA+ community at large. After receiving his license, Bang eventually moved to New York City to further his career in the beauty industry.

== Career ==
While Bang had moved to New York City and given up his music career due to his throat condition, a South Korean television producer from Seoul found his online cover videos and invited him to compete on national Korean television singing competition show, The Great Rebirth – Star Audition: The Next Big Thing 3 in 2012. Though it hurt to sing, his condition gradually improved throughout the show and Bang decided to remain in South Korea after the show to pursue his singing career.

Bang began performing under the moniker MRSHLL (pronounced "Marshall") in 2016 and officially debuted as a credited featured artist on two songs off of DJ friz's debut EP, The Record, Vol. R in March 2017. Bang signed to Seoul-based boutique record label Feel Ghood Music (home to Korean hip hop pioneers Tiger JK and Yoonmirae, and R&B singer-songwriter BIBI) and made his official solo debut as MRSHLL in June 2017 with two songs – "Circle" and "Home" – on Feel Ghood Music's compilation album, FeelGhood. A few months later, Bang made his national Korean television debut as MRSHLL on popular hip hop competition show, Show Me The Money (Season 6); where he co-wrote, featured, and performed with Woo Won Jae, Tiger JK, and Bizzy. The song T.O (Again) – released in August 2017 – ended up reaching the Top 40 charts in South Korea.

In June 2018, Bang released his first EP project Breathe, consisting of 6 songs including the title track "Come Over (featuring pH-1) and the disco dance anthem “Pose”. In October 2018, he released his second EP and first mixtape, Alien (Issa Mixtape).

Bang parted ways with Feel Ghood Music in early 2019 and made a comeback as an independent artist with the single Mirage in January 2020. In subsequent years, Bang has steadily released singles, mini-albums, and been in campaigns for Instagram, instax, and Converse and penned songs for other artists, such as co-writing Verivery's 2022 title track Undercover and 88rising (with Rich Brian and BIBI, and featuring Warren Hue)'s froyo. Bang continues to release solo music with his 90s/2000s R&B concept EP, XYZ in October 2021. Writing for Harpers Bazaar, Chyenne Tatum listed the EP as one of the top 15 K-pop albums of 2021.

== Personal life ==
Bang is gay. He first came out to his family before moving to New York City but publicly came out in a Time Out Seoul interview in 2015. He is known as the first openly gay singer in K-Pop, debuting in 2017. Though Bang’s friends warned that coming out would be “social suicide" (as it is still very taboo in Korean culture), Bang decided to be open with his sexuality from the start as he feels it is nothing to be ashamed of. In spite of the fact that his parents are not accepting, Bang is fully supported by his brothers and his chosen family.

== Discography ==
=== Extended plays ===
Title	Album details	Peak chart positions	Sales
Title	Album details	KOR	Sales
breathe	Released: June 5, 2018; Label: Feel Ghood Music; Formats: CD, digital download	—	—N/a
ARCHIVES 1	Released: April 18, 2021; Label: MRSHLLarts; Formats: digital download	—	—N/a
XYZ	Released: October 28, 2021; Label: MRSHLLarts; Formats: digital download	—	—N/a

=== Compilation albums ===
Title	Album details	Peak chart positions	Sales
Title	Album details	KOR	Sales
FeelGhood with Tiger JK, Yoonmirae, Bizzy, Junoflo, Ann One	Released: June 27, 2017; Label: FeelGhood Music; Formats: CD, digital download	—	—N/a

=== Singles ===
- pancakes (with TOMMY YANG) (2019)
- 001 (with Nieah) (2019)
- mirage / caress (2020)
- I Don't Wanna Know (with Vardaan Arora) (2020)
- RECEiVE (2020)
- Never Too Late (featuring sokodomo) (2020)
- StarLiGHT (2020)
- AUTOMATIC REMIX (with Chancellor, BIBI, LeeHi, Jay Park, JAMIE, and 21 others) (2020)
- DO U (featuring Queen WA$ABII) (2020)
- deserve better (featuring CHAI) (2021)
- metamorphosis (2021)
- show me what U got (2021)
- Heart Beating (with Tia Kofi) (2022)
