= 2009 in South Korean music =

The following is a list of notable events and releases that musically occurred in 2009 in South Korea.

== Notable events and achievements ==
- February 12 – At the annual Seoul Music Awards, Wonder Girls win the grand prize.
- March 12 – Toy, Sister's Barbershop, and Kiha & The Faces win the grand prizes at the 6th Korean Music Awards.
- March 13 – "Gee" by Girls' Generation tops the Music Bank chart for nine consecutive weeks, setting a new record.
- March 28 – DFSB Kollective signs worldwide distribution deals with various South Korean music acts, including Epik High, Yoon Mi-rae and Drunken Tiger, bringing Korean music content to iTunes.
- March – According to statistics from Google trends, online searches for K-pop began their steady increase in 2009, following the release of the hit songs Super Junior's "Sorry Sorry" and Girls' Generation's "Gee".
- April 4 – BoA's self-titled debut English album becomes the first album by a Korean artist to appear on the Billboard 200, entering at number 127.
- June 27 – Wonder Girls open for the Jonas Brothers on their 2009 World Tour during their North American leg.
- July 20 – Wonder Girls make their American live television debut on The Wendy Williams Show, where they perform "Nobody".
- August 5 – The choreography of "Mister" by Kara, featuring the "butt dance", spreads in popularity in South Korea.
- October 12 – TVXQ become the first foreign artist in twenty years to peak at number one on the Japanese Oricon DVD ranking.
- October 31 – "Nobody" (English version) by Wonder Girls becomes the first K-pop song to chart on the Billboard Hot 100, entering at number 76.
- November 21 – The 2009 Mnet Asian Music Awards take place. 2NE1, 2PM, and G-Dragon win the grand prizes at the ceremony. 2NE1 becomes the first artist to win a grand prize in their debut year.
- December 10 – At the 24th Golden Disc Awards, Super Junior and Girls' Generation receive the grand prizes.
- December 16 – The inaugural Melon Music Awards are held in Seoul, with Girls' Generation and G-Dragon winning the grand prizes.
- December 19 – According to the 2009 Oricon Annual Ranking, TVXQ becomes the third best-selling artist in Japan of the year, with ₩90.3 billion in sales.

== Award shows and festivals ==
=== Award ceremonies ===
2009 music award ceremonies in South Korea
Date	Event	Host
February 12	21st Seoul Music Awards	Sports Seoul
February 22	30th & 31st Cyworld Digital Music Awards	Cyworld
March 12	6th Korean Music Awards	Korean Music Awards Committee
April 21	32nd & 33rd Cyworld Digital Music Awards	Cyworld
June 10	34th & 35th Cyworld Digital Music Awards	Cyworld
August 20	36th & 37th Cyworld Digital Music Awards	Cyworld
October 18	38th & 39th Cyworld Digital Music Awards	Cyworld
November 21	11th Mnet Asian Music Awards	CJ E&M (Mnet)
December 10	24th Golden Disc Awards	Ilgan Sports and JTBC Plus
December 13	40th & 41st Cyworld Digital Music Awards	Cyworld
December 16	1st Melon Music Awards	Kakao M

=== Festivals ===
2009 televised music festivals in South Korea
Date	Event	Host
September 19	Asia Song Festival	Korea Foundation for International Culture Exchange
December 29	SBS Gayo Daejeon	Seoul Broadcasting System (SBS)
December 30	KBS Song Festival	Korean Broadcasting System (KBS)
December 31	MBC Gayo Daejejeon	Munhwa Broadcasting Corporation (MBC)

== Debuting and disbanded in 2009 ==
=== Debuting groups ===
- 2NE1
- 4minute
- After School
- Apollo 18
- Beast
- Bye Bye Sea
- December
- f(x)
- JQT
- MBLAQ
- Rainbow
- Secret
- SHU-I
- Supreme Team
- T-ara
- Urban Zakapa

=== Solo debut ===
- Ali
- Brave Brothers
- Dara
- Dia
- Gilme
- G-Dragon
- Hwang Jung-eum
- Jo Eun-byul
- Kim Yoon-ji
- Kim Jeong-hoon
- Koo Hye-sun
- Kyeon Mi-ri
- Lee Hyun
- Park Bom
- Seo In-guk
- Taegoon
- Tymee

=== Disbanded groups ===
- Baby Vox Re.V
- Battle
- Super Junior-M

== Releases in 2009 ==
=== First quarter ===
==== January ====
Date	Title	Artist	Genre(s)
5	Romantic Novel	Gavy NJ	K-pop Dance-pop
7	Gee	Girls' Generation	K-pop Dance-pop
8	Baekajeolhyeon	Leessang	K-pop Dance-pop Korean hip hop
13	Pearlfect	Pearl	K-pop, R&B, Hip hop
15	New Schoolgirl	After School	K-pop Dance-pop
20	Forever	M. Street	K-pop Ballad
20	New Generation of Ska	Skasucks	Ska, punk

==== February ====
Date	Title	Artist	Genre(s)
3	Bring It Back 2 Old School	U-KISS	K-pop Dance-pop
6	This Is Love	Hwayobi	K-pop R&B
10	Eolmana Jokillae	BLESS/CODE-V	K-pop Pop
11	Jump Up	F.T. Island	K-pop pop-rock
12	The Red Album	Apollo18	Rock
12	Pretty Girl Special Edition	Kara	K-pop
12	Decennium	Fly to the Sky	K-pop
26	10 Ways To Say I Love You	Lena Park	Pop ballad
27	Davichi in Wonderland	Davichi	K-pop Dance-pop
30	Scream Op.1	Lee Joo-min	K-pop

==== March ====
Date	Title	Artist	Genre(s)
9	Victoria	Seomoon Tak	Rock
10	Golden Age	8Eight	K-pop Dance-pop
10	Return to My World	Im Chang-jung	K-pop
12	Sorry, Sorry	Super Junior	K-pop
20	Time For Confession	2AM	K-pop
23	Type "B" – Back To 80's	Son Dam-bi	K-pop
26	Vol. 3 There Are Different Ways to Happiness	Chu Ga-yeoul	Folk
27	Map the Soul	Epik High	Alternative hip hop
31	Dropping the Tears	K.Will	K-pop

=== Second quarter ===
==== April ====
Date	Title	Artist	Genre(s)
9	Second Half	Jo Sung-mo	Pop ballad
16	2:00PM Time for Change	2PM	K-pop
16	Gift from SG Wannabe	SG Wannabe	K-pop Pop music R&B
16	Nexen Heroes	Crying Nut	Punk rock
23	Growing Up	IU	K-pop

==== May ====
Date	Title	Artist	Genre(s)
7	Mutopia: Land of Dreams	Lee Seung-chul	Soft rock, Ballad
7	Fascination	Jun Jin	K-pop
13	Shake	Chae Yeon	K-pop
19	Avaholic	Lee Jung-hyun	K-pop
25	Romeo	Shinee	K-pop
27	Jumpin'	Koyote	K-pop

==== June ====
Date	Title	Artist	Genre(s)
1	Vol.2 Maestro	Outsider	K-pop Hip hop
9	Untouchable Mini Album 1st	Untouchable	Hip hop
25	Eternal Children (영원한 아이들)	Rux	Punk rock
29	Tell Me Your Wish (Genie)	Girls' Generation	K-pop Dance-pop

=== Third quarter ===
==== July ====
Date	Title	Artist	Genre(s)
01	The Gold	Hwayobi	K-pop R&B
02	Always You	Wax	R&B, Ballad
08	2NE1 1st Mini Album	2NE1	K-pop, dance-pop
14	Supreme Team Guide To Excellent Adventure	Supreme Team	K-pop
15	Realcollabo + RMX	Ra.D	R&B, soul
16	Cross & Change	F.T. Island	K-pop, pop-rock
21	SS501 Solo Collection	SS501	K-pop
21	Sound-G	Brown Eyed Girls	K-pop
21	A9ain	Roo'ra	Hip hop
21	Happy Women	Kyeon Mi-ri	
23	The Blue Album	Apollo 18	Rock
31	Revolution	Kara	K-pop

==== August ====
Date	Title	Artist	Genre(s)
6	Summer	Hwayobi	K-pop R&B
6	Love Class	Mighty Mouth	K-pop Pop, Hip Hop
7	Love Song	Untouchable with Geumbi	Hip-Hop
10	Uncomfortable Party	Crying Nut	Punk rock
13	See The Sea	BADA	K-pop Pop
13	Ego	Baek Ji-young	K-pop
18	Heartbreaker	G-Dragon	K-pop
18	Attitude	Brave Brothers	Hip hop
20	Someday	Hong Kyung-min	Pop rock
27	Sophisticated	Jewelry	K-pop
31	For Muzik	4minute	K-pop

==== September ====
Date	Title	Artist	Genre(s)
1	LA chA TA	f(x)	K-pop
16	[e]	Epik High	K-pop
17	Con Asia:Desde el Bloque	Daby Yamamoto	K-pop Dance-pop Hip hop
17	Shadow	Lee Seung-gi	K-pop

=== Fourth quarter ===
==== October ====
Date	Title	Artist	Genre(s)
6	Hexagonal	Leessang	K-pop Dance-pop Korean hip hop
6	Miss Mister	WoongSan	Jazz
7	Tomorrow	4Tomorrow	K-pop
8	Vocolate	Wheesung	K-pop Dance-pop
13	Movement on a Theme by Yiruma	Yiruma	Piano
14	Just BLAQ	MBLAQ	K-pop, dance-pop
14	BEAST is the B2ST	BEAST	K-pop, dance-pop
15	Dazzle	Lee Soo-young	K-pop
22	2009, Year of Us	Shinee	K-pop
22	Rebirth	SS501	K-pop
22	H Soul	Hwanhee	K-pop
26	Double Date	F.T. Triple	K-pop pop-rock

==== November ====
Date	Title	Artist	Genre(s)
4	Chu~	f(x)	K-pop, dance-pop
5	Missing You	K.Will	K-pop
6	ContiUKiss	U-KISS	K-pop Dance-pop
10	01:59PM	2PM	K-pop Dance-pop Dance Ballad
12	IU...IM	IU	K-pop
12	Gossip Girl	Rainbow	K-pop
17	Museum	MC Sniper	Hip hop
25	Because of You	After School	K-pop
27	Absolute First Album	T-ara	K-pop
29	Supsense Op.2	Lee Joo-min	R&B

==== December ====
Date	Title	Artist	Genre(s)
2	Movement on a Theme by Yiruma: 2nd Movement	Yiruma	Piano
10	Volume 2 – Manifold	Brian Joo	K-pop
10	Platonic	Eun Ji-won	K-pop
11	Merry Christmas	Untouchable with Hwayoung	Hip hop
17	End And...	Jewelry	K-pop
22	Calling You	Broken Valentine	Alternative rock

== See also ==
- 2009 in South Korea
- List of South Korean films of 2009
