= Asura Balbalta =

Studio album by Leessang
- Released: August 25, 2011
- Genre: Hip-hop
- Length: 46:38
- Language: Korean
- Label: Jungle

Leessang chronology
Hexagonal (2009)	Asura Balbalta (2011)	Unplugged (2012)

Asura Balbalta (stylized as AsuRa BalBalTa) is the seventh studio album by South Korean hip-hop duo Leessang. The album was released on August 25, 2011. The album contains 13 songs.

== Track listing ==
Asura Balbalta track listing
No.	Title	Lyrics	Music	Arrangement	Length
1.	"You're the Answer for Me" (나란 놈은 답은 너다; Prologue)	Gary	Gil	Gil	0:33
2.	"You're the Answer for Me" (나란 놈은 답은 너다; featuring Hareem)	Gary	Gil	Gil	3:57
3.	"I Turned Off the TV…" (TV를 껐네…; featuring Yoon Mi-rae, Kwon Jung-yeol)	Gary	Gil	Primary	3:34
4.	"Serenade" (featuring Gaeko, Windy City)	Gary	Gil; Kim Ban-jang; Baek Jung-hyun	Windy City	4:43
5.	"Remembrace" (회상; featuring Baek Ji-young)	Gary	Gil; DJ Juice	DJ Juice	4:47
6.	"I'll Give It All to You" (나 그대에게 모두 드리리; featuring Jungin)	Gary; Lee Jang-Hee	Gil; Lee Jang-Hee	Primary	4:25
7.	"Birds That Have to Fly Before They Die" (죽기 전까지 날아야 하는 새 (To. Bizzy); featuring Kang Saneh, Bizzy)	Gary; Bizzy; Kang Saneh	Gil; Bizzy; Kang Saneh	DJ Juice	4:04
8.	"Asura Balbalta"		DJ Friz		0:57
9.	"Hit a Cow with a Mountain in Between" (격산타우; featuring Guckkasten)	Gary; Ha Hyun-woo	Gil; Guckkasten	Guckkasten	3:35
10.	"Gangnam Swindler" (강남사짜; featuring PoBi)	Gary	Gil	Gil	4:37
11.	"Am I?" (featuring Bizzy, B-Free)	Gary; Bizzy; B-Free	Gil	Gil	3:42
12.	"Venom" (독기)	Gary	Dok2; Gary	Dok2	3:57
13.	"Grand Final (Planet Shiver Mix)"	Gary	Gil; Park Sang-hyuk	Planet Shiver	3:47
Total length:					46:38

== Award ==
- Cyworld Digital Music Awards Song of the Month – "I Turned Off the TV…"
