= Library of Soul =

Studio album by Leessang
- Released: October 14, 2005
- Genre: Hip-hop
- Length: 48:15
- Language: Korean
- Label: J Entercom

Leessang chronology
Leessang, Special Jungin (2004)	Library of Soul (2005)	Black Sun (2007)

Library of Soul is the third album by South Korean hip-hop duo Leessang. The album was released on October 14, 2005. The album contains 13 songs.

== Track listing ==
Track list
No.	Title	Length
1.	"Intro"	0:27
2.	"내가 웃는 게 아니야.." (feat. Ali)	4:11
3.	"도시 싸이클" (feat. Ye-eun)	4:14
4.	"광대" (feat. BMK)	3:46
5.	"개리와 기리 (simple life)"	4:20
6.	"JJJ" (feat. Jung-pyo)	4:35
7.	"화가" (feat. Tiger JK, Sean2slow, Dynamic Duo)	4:53
8.	"의정부 song" (feat. Yoon Mi-rae)	4:07
9.	"야바위 (skit)"	0:23
10.	"야바위" (feat. TBNY)	3:55
11.	"청춘 30" (feat. Bobby Kim)	4:35
12.	"Never Never Say Good-bye" (feat. Ali)	5:09
13.	"Outsider" (feat. Double K)	4:25
Total length:		48:15
