= Hexagonal (album) =

Studio album by Leessang
- Released: October 6, 2009
- Genre: Hip-hop
- Length: 57:07
- Language: Korean
- Label: Jungle Entertainment

Leessang chronology
Baekahjeolhyun (2009)	Hexagonal (2009)	Asura Balbalta (2011)

Hexagonal is the sixth album by South Korean hip-hop duo Leessang. The album was released on October 6, 2009. The album contains 16 songs.

== Track listing ==
Track list
No.	Title	Lyrics	Music	Arrangement	Length
1.	"HEXAGONAL (Intro)" (feat. Enzo.B)	Bizzy	Gil, Peejay	Peejay	3:47
2.	"우리 지금 만나" (feat. Jang Gi-ha & The Faces)	Gary, Jang Gi-ha	Gil, Jang Gi-ha	Jang Gi-ha	3:34
3.	"헤어지지 못하는 여자, 떠나가지 못하는 남자 (The Woman Who Can't Break Up, The Man Who Can't Leave) (Note: Samples Luther Vandross's 1983 song 'Superstar'.)" (feat. Jung-in)	Gary	Gil, Peejay	Gil, Peejay	4:44
4.	"Carousel" (feat. Lee Juck)	Gary	Gil, Double Dragon	Gil, Double Dragon	4:13
5.	"변해가네" (feat. Jung-in)	Gary, Kim Chang-ki	Gil, Kim Chang-ki	Kim Ki-won, Young-1	3:45
6.	"부서진 동네" (feat. Lucid Fall)	Gary, Lucid Fall	Lucid Fall	Gil, Lucid Fall	4:35
7.	"일터" (feat. Bizzy)	Gary	Gil, KeepRoots	Gil, KeepRoots	3:29
8.	"Journey" (feat. Casker)	Gary, Lee Jun-oh	Gil, Lee Jun-Oh	Lee Jun-Oh	3:30
9.	"Dying Freedom" (feat. Kim Ba-da)	Gary, Kim Ba-da	Kim Ba-da	Kim Ba-da	3:30
10.	"벌칙 (Skit)"				0:52
11.	"운명" (feat. Malo)	Gary	Gil, Loptimist	Loptimist	3:41
12.	"Canvas" (feat. Tiger JK, Dynamic Duo, Bizzy)	Gary, Tiger JK, Gaeko, Choiza, Bizzy	Gil, Double Dragon	Double Dragon	3:49
13.	"Run" (feat. YB)	Gary	YB	Yoon Do Hyun	3:56
14.	"To. LeeSSang"	Gary	Gil	Sang	3:40
15.	"내 몸은 너를 지웠다 (Skit)"	Gary			1:21
16.	"내 몸은 너를 지웠다" (feat. Enzo.B)	Gary	Gil	Loptimist	4:44
Total length:					57:07

== Charts positions ==
Album

Gaon Album Chart
1

Songs

title	Gaon Single Chart
"Intro (Hexagonal) (Feat. Enzo.B)"	141
"우리 지금 만나 (Feat. 장기하와 얼굴들)"	35
"헤어지지 못하는 남자, 떠나가지 못하는 여자"	1
"Carousel (Feat. 이적)"	26
"변해가네 (Feat. 정인)"	72
"부서진 동네 (Feat. Lucid Fall)"	85
"일터 (Feat. Bizzy)"	81
"Journey (Feat.Casker)"	96
"Dying Freedom (Feat. 김바다)"	107
"Skit - 벌칙"	135
"운명 (Feat. Malo)"	93
"Canvas (Feat. Tiger JK, Dynamic Duo, BIZZY)"	77
"Run (Feat. YB)"	79
"To. LeeSSang."	101
"Skit - 내 몸은 너를 지웠다"	126
"내 몸은 너를 지웠다 (Featuring Enzo.B)	43

== Award ==
- Cyworld Digital Music Awards Song Of The Month - Girl Unable To Break Up, Boy Unable To Leave (Feat. Jung-in) (헤어지지 못하는 남자, 떠나가지 못하는 여자)
