= Unplugged (Leessang album) =

Studio album by Leessang
- Released: May 25, 2012
- Genre: Hip-Hop
- Length: 43:30
- Language: Korean
- Label: Jungle Entertainment

Leessang chronology
Asura Balbalta (2011)	Unplugged (2012)

Unplugged is the eighth album by South Korean hip-hop duo Leessang. The album was released on May 25, 2012. The album contains 13 songs.

== Track listing ==
Track list
No.	Title	Lyrics	Music	Length
1.	"너에게 배운다 (My Love) [Intro]"		Gil	0:46
2.	"너에게 배운다 (My Love)"	Gary	Gil	4:55
3.	"Someday" (feat. Yoon Do-hyun)	Gary	Gil	4:42
4.	"겸손은 힘들어" (Hard to be Humble)	Jo Young-nam, Gary	Jo Young-nam	3:55
5.	"HOLA" (feat. Jung-in)	Gary	Gil, Hong So-jin	4:16
6.	"행복을 찾아서 [Intro]" (Pursuing the Happiness [Intro])		Gil, Cho Eun-hwa	1:11
7.	"행복을 찾아서" (Pursuing the Happiness [feat. Jo Hyun-a])	Gary	Gil, Cho Eun-hwa	4:02
8.	"사람들은 모두 변하나봐" (Seems Like Everybody Changes [feat. Jung-in, Simon D, Bobby Kim])	Kim Jong-jin, Gary	Kim Jong-jin	3:58
9.	"별을 따라.." (Follow the Star)			0:43
10.	"Casanova" (feat. Juvie)	Gary, Juvie	Gil, Yoon Kang-yeol	3:10
11.	"개리와 기리 세번째 이야기" (Gary and Girie 3rd Story)	Gary	Gil, Lee Joon-kyu	3:30
12.	"울고 싶어라" (Just Wanna Cry Out)	Lee Nam-i, Gary	Lee Nam-i	4:23
13.	"Bururi" (feat. Jung-in)	Gary	Gil, Double Dragon	3:59
Total length:				43:30
