= Vocal War: God's Voice =

- Also known as: War of the Singers – Divine Voice
- Genre: Music
- Starring: Lee Hwi-jae; Sung Si-kyung
- Country of origin: South Korea
- Original language: Korean
- No. of seasons: 1
- No. of episodes: 17

Production
- Production location: South Korea
- Camera setup: Multicamera setup
- Running time: 80 minutes Wednesdays at 23:10 (KST)

Original release
- Network: SBS
- Release: March 30 – August 15, 2016

Related
- Fantastic Duo; Duet Song Festival

Vocal War: God's Voice (Korean: 보컬 전쟁: 신의 목소리) is a 2016 South Korean television show. It aired on SBS from March 30 to August 15, 2016. The show involves amateur singers who wish to challenge a legendary singer of South Korea, "God's voice", and will have the opportunity to do so when the audience gives them 100 votes to go on to the next round. The show first started as a New Year's special, acting as a pilot for the show which aired on February 10, 2016.

== Hosts ==
- Lee Hwi-jae (February 10, 2016–August 15, 2016)
- Sung Si-kyung (February 10, 2016–August 15, 2016)

== Legendary singers ==
Name	Episode appearance	Number of victories and defeats
Sul Woon Do	Pilot, episodes 1, 2, 5 and 6	2 wins, 1 defeat
Yoon Do-hyun	Pilot, episodes 1–12, and 15–17	8 wins, 1 defeat
George Han Kim	Pilot, episodes 1–4, 7–10, and 13–14	3 wins, 2 defeats
Lena Park	Pilot, episode 1–17	9 wins, 1 defeat
Gummy	Pilot, episodes 1–12, and 15–17	4 wins, 4 defeats
Choi Jung-in	Episodes 3, 4, and 11–14	1 win, 2 defeats
K.Will	Episodes 5–6, and 15–16	3 wins, 0 defeats
JK Kim Dong-wook	Episodes 7 and 8	0 wins, 1 defeat
Zion.T	Episodes 9 and 10	1 win, 0 defeats
Yoon Min-soo	Episodes 11–14 and 17	3 wins, 0 defeats
So Chan-whee	Episodes 13 and 14	1 win, 0 defeats
Kim Kyung-ho	Episodes 15 and 16	0 wins, 1 defeat
Yangpa	Episode 17	0 wins, 1 defeat

== Format ==
=== Round 1 ===
==== Stage 1 ====
The contestant sings their chosen song, but without their appearance being shown to the audience. From an audience of 200, the contestant has to earn at least 100 votes from them in order to reach stage 2, otherwise they will be eliminated.

==== Stage 2 ====
The contestant's appearance is now revealed. With the remaining length of the contestant's song, they need to obtain at least three votes from the legendary singers to move onto round 2, otherwise they will be eliminated.

=== Round 2 ===
The contestant is given the chance to choose one of the legendary singers that they want to compete against. The contestant also picks a song, from a choice of four, for the legendary singer to sing. The legendary singer has three hours to prepare for the chosen song. After both the contestant and legendary singer performs, the audience votes on who they liked the best and whoever earns the highest number of votes is the winner.

=== Prizes ===
Depending on how many wins the contestant has, they will win a certain amount of money.

Wins	Prize amount in South Korean won
1	₩2,000,000
2	₩5,000,000
3	₩10,000,000
4	₩20,000,000
5	₩100,000,000

== Episode list ==
Episode	Legendary singers	Artists panel	Original air date
Pilot	Yoon Do-hyun, Lena Park, Gummy, George Han Kim, Sul Woon Do	Kim Yeong-chol, Hwang Kwanghee of ZE:A, Twice (Nayeon, Mina, Chaeyoung), Hong Seok-cheon, Muzie (UV), Ye Jung-hwa	February 10, 2016
1–2	Yoon Do-hyun, Lena Park, Gummy, George Han Kim, Sul Woon Do	Muzie (UV), Sunny (Girls' Generation), Hur Youngji (Kara), Jinsol (April), Kangnam, Kim Ji-min, Hong Seok-cheon, Yang Se-hyung	March 30, 2016 and April 6, 2016
3–4	Yoon Do-hyun, Lena Park, Gummy, George Han Kim, Choi Jung-in	Lee Guk-joo, Seo Kang-joon, Hur Youngji (Kara), GOT7 (Jackson, JB), Cosmic Girls (Eunseo, Exy, Cheng Xiao), Jo Jung-chi, Muzie (UV)	April 20, 2016 and April 27, 2016
5–6	Yoon Do-hyun, Lena Park, Gummy, K.Will, Sul Woon Do	Lee Guk-joo, Joon Park, Hur Youngji (Kara), Twice (Tzuyu, Jihyo), Red Velvet (Joy, Seulgi), Lim Seul-ong, Muzie (UV)	May 4, 2016 and May 11, 2016
7–8	Yoon Do-hyun, Lena Park, Gummy, George Han Kim, JK Kim Dong-wook	Lee Guk-joo, Jasper Cho, Hur Youngji (Kara), Jinsol (April), Kim Ji-min, Kim Hyo-jin, Muzie (UV)	May 18, 2016 and May 25, 2016
9–10	Yoon Do-hyun, Lena Park, Gummy, George Han Kim, Zion.T	Lee Guk-joo, Hur Youngji (Kara), Apink (Namjoo, Chorong), Lizzy (After School), Alberto Mondi, Hong Seok-cheon, Muzie (UV)	June 8, 2016 and June 15, 2016
11–12	Yoon Do-hyun, Lena Park, Gummy, Choi Jung-in, Yoon Min-soo	Lee Guk-joo, Lee Chun-soo, Hur Youngji (Kara), VIXX (N, Hongbin), Lovelyz (Kei, Mijoo), Yang Jung-won, Jo Jung-chi, Muzie (UV)	June 22, 2016 and June 29, 2016
13–14	Lena Park, George Han Kim, Choi Jung-in, Yoon Min-soo, So Chan-whee	Lee Guk-joo, Hur Youngji (Kara), Sleepy, Kim Yong-jun, Ki Hui-hyeon (DIA), Hwang In-sun, Jo Jung-chi, Muzie (UV)	July 6, 2016 and July 13, 2016
15–16	Yoon Do-hyun, Lena Park, Gummy, K.Will, Kim Kyung-ho	Lee Guk-joo, Baek A-yeon, Hur Youngji (Kara), Gong Myung, DinDin, Gong Seo-young, Nam Chang-hie, Muzie (UV)	July 27, 2016 and August 3, 2016
17	Yoon Do-hyun, Lena Park, Gummy, Yoon Min-soo, Yangpa	Lee Guk-joo, Lee Chun-soo, Hur Youngji (Kara), Gugudan (Sejeong, Hana), Shin A-young, Jo Jung-chi, Muzie (UV)	August 15, 2016

== See also ==
- Fantastic Duo
- Duet Song Festival
