= Leessang, Special Jungin =

Compilation album by Leessang
- Released: March 5, 2004
- Genre: hip-hop
- Language: Korean

Leessang chronology
Jae,Gyebal (2003)	Leessang, Special Jungin (2004)	Library of Soul (2005)

Leessang, Special Jungin is the compilation album by South Korean hip-hop duo Leessang. The album was released on March 5, 2004. The album contains 16 songs.

== Track listing ==
Track list
No.	Title	Length
1.	"사랑은" (feat. Jung-in)
2.	"그댈 묻고" (feat. Jung-in)
3.	"Sad Song" (feat. The One)
4.	"남자이야기 - My Way" (feat. Honey Family)
5.	"출사표" (feat. Bobby Kim, 디기리)
6.	"조까라 마이싱"
7.	"7477 [Ma Frenz]" (feat. Drunken Tiger)
8.	"Luv...[Real Story]"
9.	"으라챠챠 Wake Up" (feat. CB Mass)
10.	"인생은 아름다워" (feat. BMK)
11.	"Spain" (feat. Sung-hun)
12.	"Slow Down" (feat. Kim Bum-soo)
13.	"건 Life" (feat. Nana)
14.	"알콜 Man"
15.	"831"
16.	"Fly High" (feat. Jung-in, Hareem)
