= Jae, Gyebal =

Studio album by Leessang
- Released: May 22, 2003
- Genre: Hip-hop
- Length: 47:56
- Language: Korean
- Label: YBM Seoul Records (now LOEN Entertainment); SRCD-3692

Leessang chronology
Leessang of Honey Family (2002)	Jae, Gyebal (2003)	Leessang, Special Jungin (2004)

Jae, Gyebal (Korean: 재,계발; Hanja: 再,啓發) is the second album by South Korean hip-hop duo Leessang. The album was released on May 22, 2003, and contains 14 songs.

== Track listing ==
Track list
No.	Title	Lyrics	Music	Arrangement	Length
1.	"Street 노가리 Ii" (feat. Beatbox Eun Jun)				1:57
2.	"Fly High"	Gary	Gil	Gil	4:08
3.	"Spain" (feat. Sung Hoon)	Gary	Gary, Gil	Gil	4:09
4.	"Slow Down" (feat. Kim Bum-soo)	Gary	Gil, Kim Ban-jang	Ga-byeol	4:45
5.	"리쌍부르쓰 (Interlude)"	Gary	Gary, Gil	Gil	0:52
6.	"리쌍부르쓰" (feat. Jung-in)	Gary	Gary, Gil	Gil	3:25
7.	"건-Life" (feat. Nana)	Gary	Gary, Kd	Kd	3:56
8.	"꼬리아" (feat. Lee Yoon Jung)	Lee Yoon Jung, Gary	Gil, Gary	Gil	4:01
9.	"알콜Man"	Gary	Gary	Gil	3:15
10.	"83.1"	Gary, Gil	Gary, Gil	Kim Min-soo, Gil	3:36
11.	"Still" (feat. Jung-in)	Gary	Gil, Jung-in	Gil	3:38
12.	"아름다운 추억"	Gary	Gary, Gil	Gil	4:11
13.	"인생은 아름다워"	Gary	Gil	Gil	4:02
14.	"X2" (feat. Double K)				2:01
Total length:					47:56
