= Black Sun (Leessang album) =

Studio album by Leessang
- Released: May 17, 2007
- Genre: hip-hop
- Length: 44:45
- Language: Korean
- Label: J Entercom

Leessang chronology
Library of Soul (2005)	Black Sun (2007)	Baekahjeolhyun (2009)

Black Sun is the fourth album by South Korean hip-hop duo Leessang. The album was released on May 17, 2007. The album contains 13 songs.

== Track listing ==
Track list
No.	Title	Length
1.	"007"	3:37
2.	"Ballerino" (feat. Ali)	4:27
3.	"영화처럼" (feat. Ali)	3:35
4.	"강변 살자 (Skit)"	0:28
5.	"부자 Project"	3:59
6.	"Sunshine"	4:08
7.	"살아야 한다면" (feat. Ali)	3:52
8.	"Vegabond LeeSSang" (feat. Lee Ha-neul (DJ Doc))	3:54
9.	"Dead Phone (Intro)"	0:12
10.	"Dead Phone" (feat. Rado, Ali)	3:53
11.	"투혼" (feat. Double K, Dynamic Duo, Sean2Slow)	3:44
12.	"누구를 위한 삶인가" (feat. Ryoo Seung-bum, Hwang Jung-min)	4:38
13.	"내가 웃는게 아니야 (Remix)" (feat. Ali)	4:25
Total length:		44:45
