= Leessang of Honey Family =

Studio album by Leessang
- Released: June 27, 2002
- Genre: hip-hop
- Language: Korean
- Label: Sony Music

Leessang chronology
Leessang of Honey Family (2002)	Jae,Gyebal (2003)

Leessang of Honey Family is the debut album by South Korean hip-hop duo Leessang. The album was released on June 27, 2002. The album contains 16 songs.

== Track listing ==
Track list
No.	Title	Length
1.	"Intro"	1:24
2.	"출사표" (feat. Bobby Kim, 디기리)	3:59
3.	"조까라 마이싱"	4:21
4.	"Yes. Ok" (feat. Double K)	3:28
5.	"Rush" (feat. Jung-in)	3:56
6.	"7477 (My Frenz)" (feat. Drunken Tiger)	4:28
7.	"컨디션" (feat. Double K)	3:56
8.	"인생은 아름다워" (feat. Park Sun-joo)	4:01
9.	"대한늬우스" (feat. Sean2slow)	3:16
10.	"E-he-ra" (feat. Bubble Sisters)	3:31
11.	"Street 노가리" (feat. Eun-jun)	2:39
12.	"Luv.. (Real Story)" (feat. Park Sun-joo, Sunny)	4:11
13.	"으라챠챠 - Wake Up" (feat. CB Mass)	3:54
14.	"빛좋은 개살구 2" (feat. 교주박, 디기리)	3:56
15.	"Wammin' Up" (feat. Choi Sun-sang)	3:34
16.	"끝으로" (feat. Hwayobi)	3:40
Total length:		55:24
