= Yoon Do-hyun =

South Korean musician and actor (born 1972)

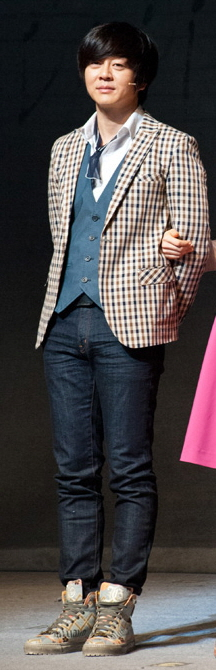
- Yoon in 2012
- Born: February 3, 1972 (age 54); Paju, South Korea
- Education: Incheon City College – Civil Engineering; Sungkonghoe University – Media and Communication
- Occupations: Singer; musician; songwriter; MC; actor
- Years active: 1993–present
- Agent: Dee Company
- Spouse: Lee Mi-ok (m. 2002)

Korean name
- Hangul: 윤도현
- Hanja: 尹度玹
- RR: Yun Dohyeon
- MR: Yun Tohyŏn
- Website: deecompany.kr

Yoon Do-hyun (Korean: 윤도현; born February 3, 1972) is a South Korean hard rock/folk rock singer, musician, and songwriter. He is the founder and lead vocalist of the Yoon Do-hyun Band (YB) since 1996. Yoon is also an MC on TV variety programs (notably Yoon Do-hyun's Love Letter) and a musical theatre actor.

== Career ==
Yoon Do-hyun was born in Imjin-myeon (currently Munsan-eup) in Paju, Gyeonggi Province. He graduated from Munsan High School in 1991, and began working in 1993 around Paju's music circles as part of the band Jongyiyeon (종이연).

In 1994, Yoon released his debut solo album, In Front of the Post Office in Autumn (가을 우체국 앞에서). It produced the hit singles "Tarzan" and "Love Two," but the album did not receive much commercial success since dance music was trendy at the time.

Yoon formed the eponymously named Yoon Do-hyun Band in 1996, with himself on vocals, drummer Kim Jin-won, guitarist Yoo Byung-yeol, and bass guitarist Park Tae-hee. Later that year, Yoon played the lead role in Jungle Story, Kim Hong-joon's film that recounts the rise and fall of a fictitious, underground band. His bandmates also appeared in the film.

Its initial failure to break out led to the Yoon Do-hyun Band almost disbanding in 2000, and guitarist Yoo Byung-yeol left the band and was replaced by Huh Joon. Then in 2002, they gained fame with the World Cup cheer song "Oh! Pilseung Korea" (meaning "Victory Korea!"). With its explosive live performances and Yoon's powerful voice and frank personality onstage, the Yoon Do-hyun Band eventually became one of the foremost rock bands in South Korea, selling more than 2 million albums and doing more than 100 live concerts. It won music awards from Korea's three main broadcast stations KBS, MBC and SBS, and won the WPMA (World Peace Music Award) in 2003 for their activities in promoting human rights. Renamed YB in 2005, it was the first Korean band to ever tour Europe and had two sold-out concerts in New York City (Nokia Theater, B.B King Blues Club) in 2006. YB was the subject of two rockumentaries, Kim Tae-yong's On the Road, Two (2006) and Moon Cheung-heum's Flying Butterfly (2010). YB celebrated its 20th anniversary in 2015 with a series of sold-out concerts titled "20 Years Old."

Meanwhile, Yoon starred in stage musicals such as Jesus Christ Superstar, Hedwig and the Angry Inch, Gwanghwamun Sonata, and Once. He also hosted the popular music-talk show Yoon Do-hyun's Love Letter from April 2002 to November 2008.

As a solo artist, Yoon has released two albums and three EPs, including Difference (2005), Harmony (2009), and Singing Yoon Do-hyun (노래하는 윤도현, 2014).

In October 2021, it was announced that Yoon Do-hyun would participate in Sing Again 2 as the new judge for season 2.

== Personal life ==
Yoon married musical theatre actress Lee Mi-ok on June 15, 2002. They have one daughter. In August 2023, he revealed via Instagram that he had been battling lymphatic cancer for the past 3 years, but is now cancer free.

== Discography ==
=== Studio albums ===
Title	Album details	Peak chart positions	Sales
Title	Album details	KOR	Sales
In Front of the Post Office in Autumn (가을 우체국 앞에서)	Released: December 1994; Label: Daeum Entertainment; Format: CD, cassette	—N/a	
Difference	Released: April 29, 2005; Label: Daeum Entertainment; Format: CD, cassette	5	KOR: 142,232
"—" denotes releases that did not chart or were not released in that region.

=== Extended plays ===
Title	Album details	Peak chart positions	Sales
Title	Album details	KOR	Sales
Harmony	Released: September 18, 2009; Label: Daeum Entertainment; Format: CD, download	—N/a	
Singing Yoon Do-hyun (노래하는 윤도현)	Released: September 16, 2014; Label: Dee Company; Format: CD, download	17	KOR: 1,580
The Acoustic Forest (음악 캠핑 갈래?)	Released: August 11, 2020; Label: Dee Company; Format: CD, download	—	
"—" denotes releases that did not chart or were not released in that region.

=== Singles ===
Title	Year	Peak chart positions	Album
Title	Year	KOR	Album
"I Guess I Loved You" (사랑했나봐)	2005	—N/a	Difference
"Wish It Were You" (너라면 좋겠어)	2009	—N/a	Harmony
"Kim Je-dong Song – Oh-kyo-kyo-kyo" (김제동송 - 오쿄쿄쿄)	2010	97	Non-album single
"Weather By You" (당신이 만든 날씨)	2013	56	The Acoustic Forest
"The Day" (그 날) (with Achtung)	2014	—	Non-album singles
"First Love" (오늘도 어제 같은 나는...)	2014	—	Non-album singles
"How I Look These Days" (요즘 내 모습) (feat. Tablo and K.Will)	2014	39	Singing Yoon Do-hyun
"Much as the Time (We Loved Each Other" (우리 사랑했던 시간만큼)	2014	38	Singing Yoon Do-hyun
"Nightmare" (with Reddy, G2, Inlayer and Johnny)	2016	—	SM Station Season 1
"Sparks Fly"	2017	—	SM Station Season 1
"Trip"	2017	—	Non-album singles
"A Song For You" (널 부르는 노래)	2018	—	Non-album singles
"Everyone Changes" (사람들은 모두 변하나봐) (with Jung Jae-il)	2018	—	Non-album singles
"The Sound of Rain" (빗소리)	2020	—	The Acoustic Forest
"—" denotes releases that did not chart or were not released in that region.

=== Other contributions ===
Title	Year	Notes
"In the Wilderness"	1996	Track from the Kim Kwang-seok tribute album 가객: 부치지 않은 편지
"잃어버린 나를 찾아"	1996	Track from Thief OST
"신놀부뎐"	1997	Track from Black and White Photograph 1
"사노라면" (with Kim Jang-hoon)	1998	Track from Kim Jang-hoon#1998; Ballads for Tears
"같은 맘으로" (with Kim Hyung-suk)	2001	Track from Ac+E No2
"마음을 다해 부르면" (with Lee So-eun)	2003	Tracks from Oseam OST
"다시 만나요"	2003	Tracks from Oseam OST
"비련" (with Kim So-hyun)	2003	Track from Legend of Laqia OST
"천국에서" (with Ann)	2004	Track from Phoenix Rising
"여행길" (with Buga Kingz)	2005	Track from The Renaissance
"날아라 병아리" (with N.EX.T)	2006	Track from ReGame?
"끝이 아니길"	2006	Track from Seoul 1945 OST
"Farewell Story" (with Lala)	2007	Track from 우리, 사랑하는 동안... 두번째 이야기
"겨울비"	2007	Track from Kim Jong-seo's 20th Anniversary Greatest Hits
"I Love You, Idiot" (with Kang Chae-yi)	2008	Track from 사랑에 중독되다
"Come Together" (with Tomi Kita)	2008	Track from In Dreamz
"Friends" (with Eva & Sat)	2008	Track from Friends
"그랬단 말이야" (with Shin So-hee)	2008	Track from 그랬단 말이야
"Cuts the City" (with Steranko)	2008	Track from Darkness on the Highway
"Foolish Love" (with Ash Gray)	2009	
"Red Camel" (with Lee Seung-hwan)	2009	Track from Hwantastic Friends
"Dust (Korean Ver.)" (with Diablo)	2010	Track from Undefined
"Being a Rock Star" (with Lee Seung-hwan, Lee Sung-woo, Ock Yo-han)	2010	Track from Dreamizer
"날자, 오리배..." (with Jung Tae-choon, Kang San-ae, Kim C)	2012	Track from City Bus Going to the Sea
"Someday" (with Leessang)	2012	Track from Unplugged
"Never Say Goodbye" (with Psy)	2012	Track from Psy 6 (Six Rules), Part 1
"Butterfly Dream (My Secret Dream)"	2012	Track from Arang and the Magistrate OST
"Still You" (with Sue Son)	2012	Track from I Am
"I Want to Live with Her" (with UV)	2012	Track from Artist
"No Regrets (Legend Ver.)" (with Hwang Jung-min and Yoo Jun-sang)	2013	Theme song from Fists of Legend
"Wish"	2013	Theme song from Hope
"Colorful World" (with Kahi)	2013	Track from Who Are You?
"Cruel Memories (with Jung Yong-hwa from CNBLUE)	2015	Track from One Fine Day

== Acting ==
=== Musical theatre ===
Year	Title	Role
1995	Gaeddongi	Gaeddongi
1997	Jesus Christ Superstar	Judas Iscariot
1998	Hard Rock Cafe	Kang-joo
2009	Hedwig and the Angry Inch	Hedwig
2011–2012	Gwanghwamun Sonata	Past Sang-hoon
2013	Jesus Christ Superstar	Judas Iscariot
2014–2015	Once	Guy
2016	Hedwig and the Angry Inch	Hedwig
2021	Gwanghwamun Sonata	Myung-woo
2021–2022	Wonder Ticket	Phung Beak

=== Filmography ===
Year	Title	Role	Notes/Ref.
1996	Jungle Story	Do-hyun	
2000	The Promenade	(cameo)	
2004	Arahan	Male driver (cameo)	
2006	On the Road, Two	Himself	Documentary
2006	Hanbando	—N/a	Music director
2010	Flying Butterfly	Himself	Documentary
2012	Arang and the Magistrate	Former magistrate of Miryang (cameo, episode 1)	TV
2012	26 Years	—N/a	Crowdfunding investor
2021	Taxi Driver	Yoon Gi-sa (cameo, episode 1)	SBS

== Variety show ==
Year	Title	Network	Notes/Ref.
2002–2008	Yoon Do-hyun's Love Letter	KBS2	Host
2002–2011	Yoon Do-hyun's 2pm Date	MBC FM4U	Radio DJ
2010	Joo Young-nam and Friends	KBS1	
2010	It City: Papa & Girl in London	Olive	
2011–2012	I Am a Singer	MBC	Contestant
2011–2013	Yoon Do-hyun's MUST	Mnet	Host
2011	Cover Dance Festival! K-POP Roadshow 40120	MBC	Host
2011–present	Law of the Jungle	SBS	Narrator
2011–2012	K-pop Star 1	SBS	Host and narrator
2012	Project Lotus	Channel V	Judge
2012–present	TV Entertainment Tonight	SBS	Host
2012–2013	K-pop Star 2	SBS	Host and narrator
2013	I'm Your Substitute Angel	MBC	Host
2014	Welcome Back to School	JTBC	Cast member
2015	Animals	MBC	Cast member
2017	Begin Again	JTBC	Cast Member
2020	Korean Trot Contest	KBS2	Host
2021	Fireman Boy	tvN STORY & tvN	Cast Member
2021–2022	Sing Again Season 2	JTBC	Judge
2022	Culture of Jeju Haenyeo [women divers]	YouTube	Narrator; language Korean
2022–present	I'am Yoon Do-hyun at 4 p.m.	MBC FM4U	DJ; May 30, 2022–present

== Awards and nominations ==
Year	Award	Category	Nominated work	Result
2002	MBC Drama Awards	Top Excellence Award in Radio	Yoon Do-hyun's 2pm Date	Won
2003	KBS Entertainment Awards	Excellence Award in a Variety Show	Yoon Do-hyun's Love Letter	Won
2012	SBS Entertainment Awards	Producer's Award – Best MC	K-pop Star 1, Law of the Jungle, TV Entertainment Tonight	Won
2022	2022 MBC Entertainment Awards	Excellence Award, Radio Category	4 O'Clock Yoon Do-hyun	Won

== See also ==
- YB (band)
