= Tiger JK =

South Korean-American rapper, singer and entrepreneur

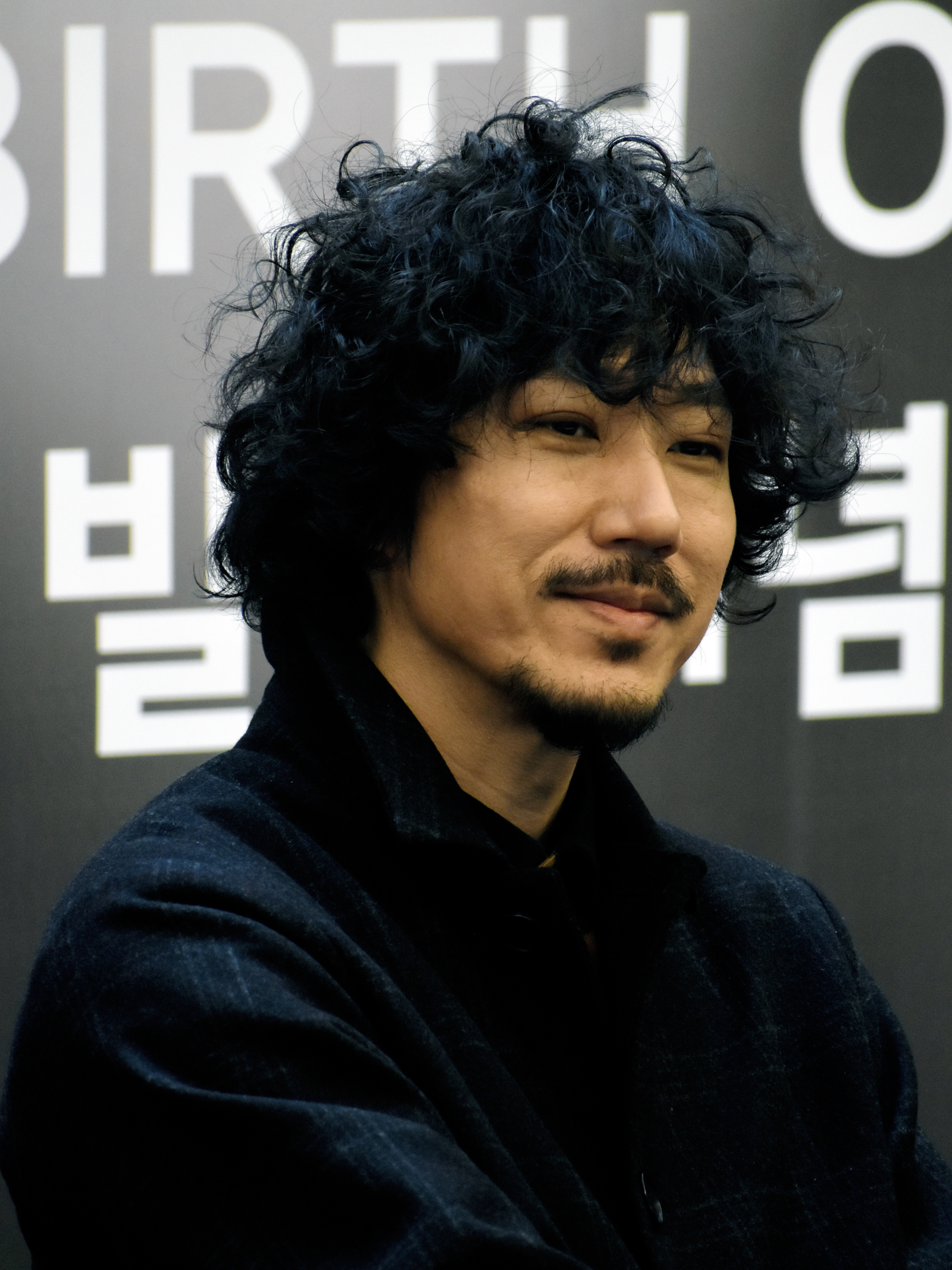
- Tiger JK during an autograph event in Bundang, December 2018

Background information
- Also known as: JK, Drunken Tiger, DT
- Born: Seo Jung-kwon; July 29, 1974 (age 52)
- Origin: Seoul, South Korea
- Genre: Korean hip hop
- Occupations: Rapper; singer; record producer; entrepreneur; actor
- Instrument: Vocals
- Years active: 1995–present
- Labels: Oasis Records; Feel Ghood Music
- Spouse: Yoon Mi-rae (m. 2007)
- Children: 1

Korean name
- Hangul: 서정권
- RR: Seo Jeonggwon
- MR: Sŏ Chŏnggwŏn

Seo Jung-kwon (Korean: 서정권; born July 29, 1974), also known as Tiger JK (타이거 JK), is a South Korea-born American rapper, record producer, and entrepreneur based in South Korea. He is best known as a founding member of Korean hip hop group Drunken Tiger. He has also founded two record labels, Jungle Entertainment and Feel Ghood Music. He is a member of the South Korean hip hop trio MFBTY.

He is considered a highly influential figure in the development of Korean hip-hop and is credited with helping bring the genre into the Korean mainstream. The Los Angeles Times referred to him in 2011 as "perhaps the most popular Korean rapper in America, Asia and the world."

== Early life ==
Tiger JK (Seo Jung-kwon) was born in Seoul, South Korea on July 29, 1974. His father, Suh Byung Hoo (d. 2014), was a DJ and one of the first Korean pop columnists, and the first Billboard correspondent in Korea in the 1970s. His family moved to the United States when he was 12, and he was sent to briefly live with an uncle in Miami, Florida, where he practiced Taekwondo, becoming a 3rd "dan" black belt.

He spent his teenage years in Los Angeles, California, where he attended Glendale Hoover High School in Glendale, CA. As a teen in Los Angeles, Tiger JK witnessed the violence between Korean-Americans and African-Americans during the 1992 Los Angeles Riots. He later said he wanted to use hip hop to create a dialogue between the two communities.

Tiger JK attended Santa Monica College and then transferred to UCLA and graduated with a B.A. degree in English from the Creative Writing program.

== Musical career ==
=== 1995 – 2005: Early career and successes with Drunken Tiger ===
In 1995, Tiger JK's first solo album, Enter The Tiger, was released in Korea by Oasis Records, a connection Tiger JK had made because his father was friends with the company's CEO. The album got little airplay due to its perceived explicit content.

Tiger JK returned to the United States and teamed up with DJ Shine to form the group Drunken Tiger in 1998. The group debuted in Korea and, despite the explicit content of their lyrics and the group's rejection of mainstream music trends, they achieved popularity with their first album, Year of the Tiger, which included the hit songs, "I Want You" and "Do You Know Hip-hop."

Over the next several years, Drunken Tiger brought on new members and released multiple albums, winning numerous awards. Founding member DJ Shine left the group in 2005.

=== 2006–2013: Creation of Jungle Entertainment and collaborations ===
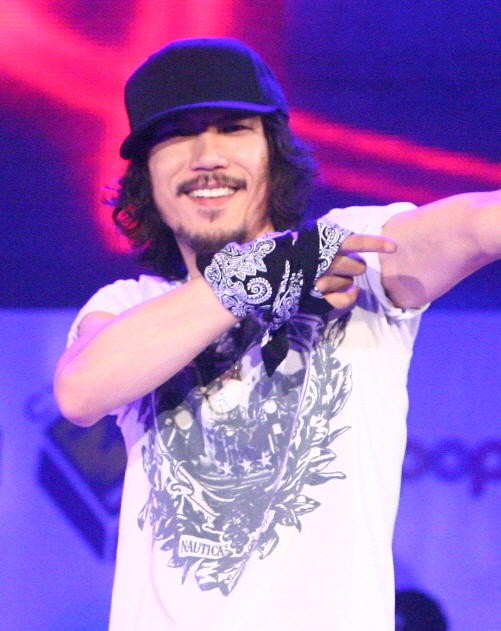
Tiger JK performing at the Lolipop Concert in May 2010

In 2006, Tiger JK left Oasis Records and established his own hip-hop label, Jungle Entertainment. The label represented Drunken Tiger, and prominent Korean rappers Yoon Mi-rae and Leessang were among the artists to join the label over the next few years.

Tiger JK continued to release music with Drunken Tiger over the next few years, while also collaborating with other artists. In 2012, he featured on "Let This Die," a single by Brian Joo of the R&B duo Fly to the Sky. That same year, he featured on "Wicked," a song by new K-pop girl group Fiestar.

=== 2013-present: Founding MFBTY and Feel Ghood Music ===
In 2013, Tiger JK teamed up with Yoon Mi-rae and Bizzy to form the group MFBTY, an acronym for "My Fans are Better Than Yours." Soon after, he left Jungle Entertainment and founded a new label, Feel Ghood Music, which now releases MFBTY's music. He has had multiple collaborations with popular boy group leader RM of BTS with the latter featuring on his final album Drunken Tiger X: Rebirth of Tiger JK on the song Timeless. He also featured in Seventeen's Hoshi's Tiger released in 2022. In 2023, he featured on "TOPLINE", a single released by K-pop group Stray Kids, also appearing in the official M/V. He was featured on IVE's Looks Can Kill remix by Alwawn on October 30.

== Personal life ==
=== Drug conviction ===
Tiger JK was arrested for using methamphetamine in Korea in 2000, at the same time that members of the Korean hip hop group Uptown were also arrested on drug charges. Tiger JK said that, though he had used drugs in the past, he had not used them in Korea, and he said that he was ultimately found guilty due to false testimony from the members of Uptown. He spent a month and a half in jail and was given two years probation.

=== Illness ===
Tiger JK was diagnosed with acute transverse myelitis, a spinal cord condition that affects motor functions, in 2006. He was hospitalized and took a two-year hiatus from performing. As of 2014, he continued to take medication to treat the condition.

=== Marriage and family ===
In June 2007, Tiger JK married rapper and singer Yoon Mi-rae in a private ceremony in a Buddhist Temple. The wedding occurred a month before the death of his grandmother who had wanted to see them wed before her death. Yoon gave birth to their son, Jordan, in March 2008.

== Other projects ==
In 2006, Tiger JK launched a clothing line called Lungta.

In 2011, under American rapper Dr. Dre's "Beats By Dr. Dre" headphones line, Tiger JK released his own limited edition headphones. They retailed for 690,000 won, and all profits went to a child safety organization.

== Discography ==
=== Studio albums ===
- Enter the Tiger (1995)
- Drunken Tiger X: Rebirth of Tiger JK (2018)

=== Singles ===
Title	Year	Peak positions		Album
Title	Year	KOR	US World	Album
"Forever" (반가워요) (chorus by Yoon Mi-rae)	2015	71	24	Non-album singles
"I Know" (이런건가요)	2015	— (Note: "I Know" did not enter the Gaon Digital Chart, but it peaked at number 84 on the component Download Chart.)	—	Non-album singles
"Fly Like an Eagle" (이글거려) (feat. Yoon Mi-rae and Bizzy)	2015	—	—	Non-album singles
"Here to Stay" (with Skull)	2017	—	—	Non-album singles
"Ghood Family" (with Yoon Mi-rae, feat. Bizzy, Black Nine, BB and Mrshll)	2017	—	—	Non-album singles
"Draw Your Love" (with Yoon Mi-rae and Bizzy)	2019	—	—	Non-album singles
"This is Pengsoo" (펭수로 하겠습니다) (with Pengsoo, Bizzy and Bibi)	2020	54	—	Non-album singles
"kiss kiss bang bang" (feat twlv)	2020	—	—	Non-album singles
"Love Peace" (호심술)	2021	— (Note: "Love Peace" did not enter the Gaon Digital Chart, but it peaked at number 97 on the component Download Chart.)	—	Non-album singles
"POV"	2022	—	—	Non-album singles
"Self Love" (with F.Hero, Yoon Mi-rae and Billkin)	2022	—	—	Non-album singles
"Jinju" (진주) (with Yoon Mi-rae)	2023	— (Note: "Jinju" did not enter the Gaon Digital Chart, but it peaked at number 77 on the component Download Chart.)	—	Non-album singles
"T.K.D" (with Taekwoncre)	2024	—	—	Non-album singles

=== Soundtrack appearances ===
Title	Year	Peak positions		Album
Title	Year	KOR	US World	Album
"First Love" (첫사랑) (feat. Punch)	2014	63	—	Pinocchio OST
"Reset" (feat. Jinsil of Mad Soul Child)	2015	22	22	Who Are You: School 2015 OST
"A Beautiful Lie" (어디로 가야해) (with Bizzy)	2019	—	—	Beautiful World OST
"The Sea Doesn't Get Wet in the Rain" (바다는 비에 젖지 않아)	2022	—	—	Monstrous OST
"Daemuga" (대무가) (with MC Meta and Nucksal)	2022	—	—	Daemuga OST
"Wadadada" (와다다다)	2022	— (Note: "Wadadada" did not enter the Gaon Digital Chart, but it peaked at number 96 on the component Download Chart.)	—	One Dollar Lawyer OST

== Filmography ==
=== Film ===
Year	Title	Role
2015	세계일주 (Trip Around the World)	Pil Hong

=== Television ===
Year	Title	Role	Notes/Ref.
2010	High Kick Through the Roof	Gwang-soo's friend	Tiger JK made a cameo appearance on this sitcom.
2010	Infinite Challenge	Himself	His team won on the "Highway Music Festival" episodes of this variety show.
2010	"Project Runway: Korea" (season 2)	Himself	He appeared on "Project Runway: Korea" Season Two, Episode Eight titled "Hiphopper's Wedding Crasher." He challenged the designers to create a wedding dress for his Fiancé, and was a judge in the episode as well.
2011	Welcome to the Jungle: Sunzoo	Himself	This was a reality show special.
2012	Salamander Guru and The Shadows	Tiger	He made a cameo appearance on this sitcom.
2012	The Hero on Stage: Tiger JK.ING	Himself	This was a 2-part TV documentary about Tiger JK.
2016	We Kid	Himself	Tiger JK is a judge on this music competition show for kids.
2017	Show Me The Money	Himself	He appeared on this music competition show as a producer judge
2019	Boss in the Mirror	Himself	He appeared as boss of Feel Ghood Music in the show
2021	Wild Idol	Coach	

== Endorsements ==
- Hite w/Drunken Tiger
- Kia w/Tiger JK
- Reebok w/Tiger JK
- Yahoo w/Tiger JK
- CJ One Card w/ Tiger JK and Yoon MiRae
- Samsung w/Tiger JK, Yoon Mirae and Jordan
- Giordano w/Tiger JK
- Pringles w/Drunken Tiger
- Moneual w/Tiger JK and Yoon Mirae
- Hangame w/Tiger JK
- The Body Shop w/Tiger JK and Yoon Mirae
- Guinness w/Tiger JK
- SK Telecom w/Tiger JK and Bizzy
- SONY w/Tiger JK and Yoon Mirae

== Awards and nominations ==
Year	Award	Category	Nominated work	Result
2009	Mnet Asian Music Awards	Best Male Artist	"Monster"	Won
2009	Mnet Asian Music Awards	Best Rap Performance	"Monster"	Nominated
2010	Style Icon Awards	Beautiful Sharing	Tiger JK and Yoon Mi-rae	Won
2010	Mnet 20's Choice Awards	Most Influential Stars	Tiger JK and Yoon Mi-rae	Won
2011	Men's Health Cool Guy Contest	Best Cover Model	Tiger JK	Won
2016	11th Soompi Awards	Best Drama OST (share with Jinsil)	Who Are You: School 2015 (Reset)	Won
