= Baekajeolhyeon =

Studio album by Leessang
- Released: January 8, 2009
- Genre: hip-hop
- Length: 45:55
- Language: Korean
- Label: J Entercom

Leessang chronology
Black Sun (2007)	Baekajeolhyeon (2009)	Hexagonal (2009)

Baekajeolhyeon (Korean: 백아절현; Hanja: 伯牙絶絃) is the fifth album by South Korean hip-hop duo Leessang. The album was released on January 8, 2009. The album contains 12 songs.

== Track listing ==
Track list
No.	Title	Length
1.	"Intro" (feat. Unknown DJs)	1:56
2.	"River To Ocean" (feat. The Quiett, Dok2, Rhyme Bus, Bizzy, Maboos)	4:28
3.	"Surviver" (feat. Y.D.G, Leo Kekoa, 디기리, TopBob, Juvie Train, 넋업샤니)	5:08
4.	"In The Beginning" (feat. MC Meta, Sean2slow, Bobby Kim, 명호, DJ Wreckx)	3:07
5.	"난 말이야..." (feat. Epik High, Hyun-a)	3:57
6.	"역마살" (feat. Hyun-a)	3:55
7.	"챔피언" (feat. Jung-in)	5:01
8.	"사람이어라…"	4:02
9.	"Street 노가리 3 (Beat Box by 은준)" (beatbox by. Eun-jun)	2:08
10.	"개리와 기리 2"	4:12
11.	"망가져가"	4:31
12.	"Ballerino Remix"	3:30
Total length:		45:55
