= Ali (South Korean singer) =

South Korean singer (born 1984)

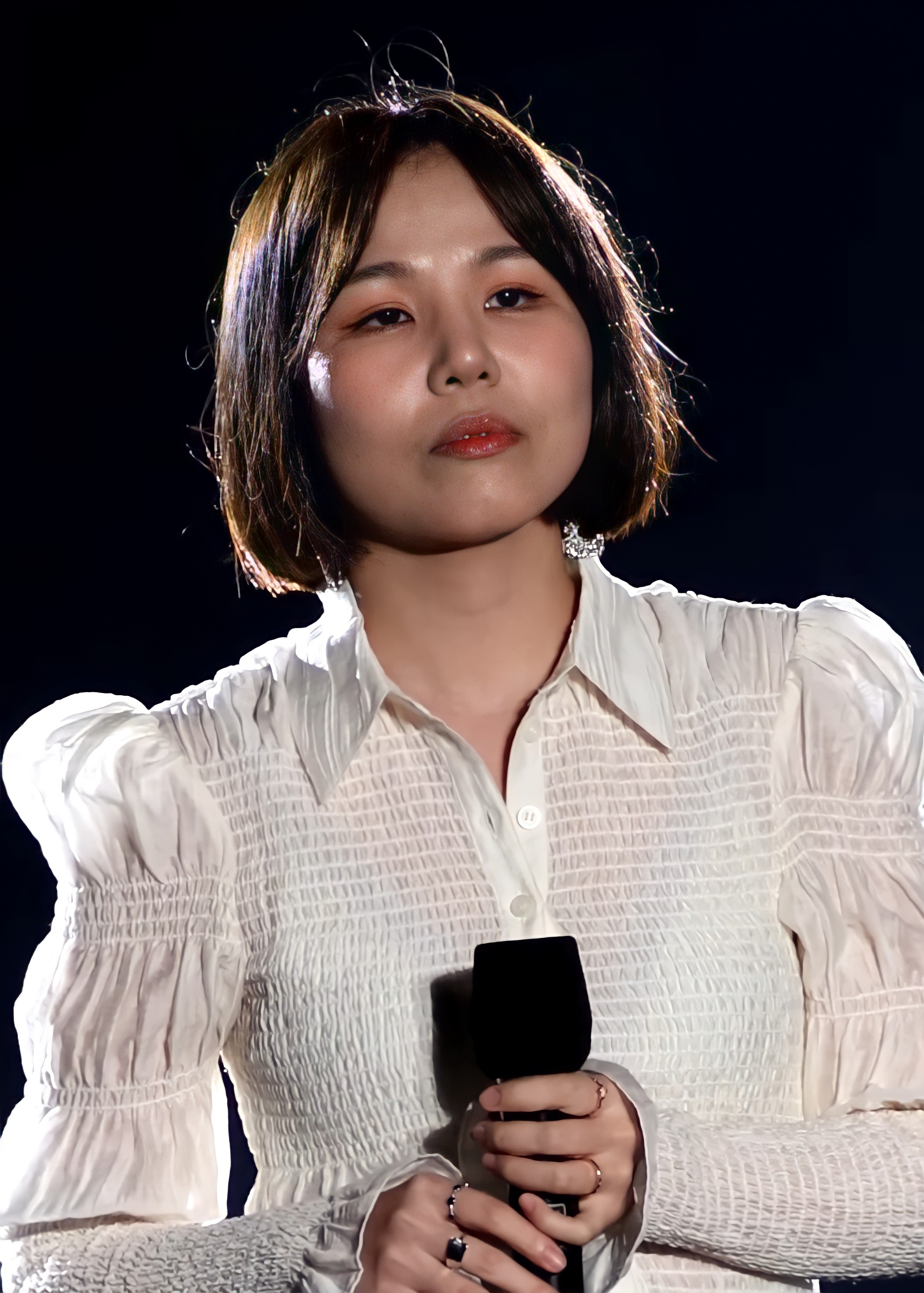
- Ali in 2020

Background information
- Born: Jo Yong-jin; November 20, 1984 (age 41); Seoul, South Korea
- Genres: K-pop; R&B
- Instruments: Vocals; piano
- Years active: 2005–present
- Label: Soul Sting

Jo Yong-jin (Korean: 조용진; born November 20, 1984), known professionally as Ali (Korean: 알리), is a South Korean singer, songwriter, pianist, musical artist, radio host and professor in applied musical arts at the Seoul Technical Arts College. Following her debut in 2009, she was primarily recognized for her time as a contestant on the KBS program Immortal Songs 2.

== Career ==
ALi debuted as a singer in 2009, and gained fame for her appearances on music shows, most notably Immortal Songs 2 on KBS2 and King of Mask Singer on MBC. Currently, ALi has the highest score and most wins for a female artist on Immortal Songs 2, hence her being known as the "madam of Immortal Songs". She also worked as a professor in applied musical arts at the Seoul Technical Arts College.

As a professor, ALi has taught BtoB members, Changsub and Hyunsik, as well as renowned singer Kim Feel.

ALi released her first album SOULri in December 2011, two years after her official debut. One released track, "Na Young", garnered immediate controversy as it referenced a sexual assault case that had become publicly known in South Korea. Many detractors criticized the song for being insensitive to the subject of its lyrics. ALi later addressed this controversy by revealing that she herself was a survivor of sexual assault. Following the release of her album, she held her first independent concert. She was also a vocalist on several Leessang songs, including "Ballerino" and "I'm Not Laughing". She has also released several OSTs for Korean dramas, including "Hurt" ("상처") from "Rooftop Prince", "The Vow" from "Golden Rainbow" and "In My Dream" from "Empire of Gold".

Recently, Ali has made her musical debut in the Korean rendition of the musical Rebecca and started working on her own label, Soul Sting, and radio station. From her label, she produced her first duo group, Am:Pm, consisting of two of her students.

== Personal life ==
Ali's father is newspaper publisher Jo Myung-shik. She has one younger brother and one younger sister.

Ali married an office worker on May 11, 2019 in Seoul. She gave birth to a son in September 2019.

== Discography ==
=== Studio albums ===
| Title | Album details | Peak chart positions | Sales |
| Title | Album details | KOR | Sales |
|---|---|---|---|
| Soul-Ri: A Village With Soul (영혼이 있는 마을) | Released: December 13, 2011; Label: Yedang Entertainment; Format: CD, digital download; Track listing: 1. "Round and Round" (핑핑글); 2. "The First Greeting" (첫 인사); 3. "Don't Act Countrified" (촌스럽게 굴지마; featuring Yong Jun-hyung); 4. "Crazy Night"; 5. "365 Days"; 6. "I'll Be Damned" (뭐 이런게 다있어); 7. "Vampire" (뱀파이어); 8. "Na Young" (나영이); 9. "Because of You" (너로 인해); 10. "Oasis" (오아시스); 11. "Rage" (울컥) | 23 | KOR: 3,159 |
| ALi Immortal Songs (ALi 불후의 명곡) | Released: January 27, 2012; Label: Yedang Entertainment; Format: CD, digital download; Track listing: 1. "NaNaNa" (나나나); 2. "The Leopard of Kilimanjaro" (킬리만자로의 표범); 3. "I've Lived Without Knowing the World Out There" (세상 모르고 살았노라); 4. "Alley" (골목길); 5. "Hateful Person" (얄미운 사람); 6. "Early Morning Rain" (새벽비); 7. "Where the Wind Blows" (바람이 불어오는 곳); 8. "My Heart Have Nowhere to Go" (내 마음 갈 곳을 잃어); 9. "Too Far to Be Close" (가까이 하기엔 너무 먼 당신); 10. "Goodbye" (안녕) | 20 | KOR: 1,720 |

=== Extended plays ===
| Title | EP details | Peak chart positions | Sales |
| Title | EP details | KOR | Sales |
|---|---|---|---|
| After the Love Has Gone | Released: October 8, 2009; Label: Trophy Entertainment; Format: CD, digital download; Track listing: 1. "365 Days" (365일); 2. "Crazy Night"; 3. "Vampire" (뱀파이어); 4. "Rage" (울컥); 5. "The First Greeting" (첫인사); 6. "365 Days" (inst.); 7. "Crazy Night" (inst.); 8. "Vampire" (inst.) | No data | No data |
| Eraser (지우개) | Released: January 30, 2013; Label: Yedang Entertainment; Format: CD, digital download; Track listing: 1. "Eraser" (지우개); 2. "The Tears Gone" (눈물이 흘러 버렸어; featuring Kang Jun of C-Clown); 3. "Don't Say Another Word" (말 돌리지 마); 4. "Selfish" (이기적이야); 5. "Eraser" (inst.); 6. "The Tears Gone" (inst.) | 20 | KOR: 812 |
| Turning Point | Released: November 12, 2014; Label: Juice Entertainment; Format: CD, digital download; Track listing: 1. "Pung Pung" (펑펑); 2. "Song Can't Lie" (노래는 거짓말을 못해요); 3. "Missing You"; 4. "Drunken Phone Call" (취중전화); 5. "I'm with Geudaeyeo" (그대여 함께해요); 6. "Pung Pung" (펑펑; inst.); 7. "Song Can't Lie" (inst.); 8. "Missing You" (inst.; bonus track); 9. "What Is Luv" (bonus track) | 14 | KOR: 1,192 |
| White Hole | Released: October 15, 2015; Label: Sony Music; Format: CD, digital download; Track listing: 1. "Different Love, Forgotten Love" (사랑이 다른 사랑으로 잊혀지네); 2. "I, Me" (내가, 나에게); 3. "Shining Is Blue" (with Yoo Jun-sang); 4. "Feel Good"; 5. "To Ma Dear"; 6. "I, Me" (내가, 나에게) (Inst.); 7. "To Ma Dear" (Inst.) | 23 | KOR: 733 |
| Expand | Released: November 16, 2017; Label: Juice Entertainment; Format: CD, digital download; Track listing: 1. "102" (102가지); 2. "No Way" (말이 되니); 3. "Island" (섬); 4. "Black and White"; 5. "No Way" (말이 되니; inst.); 6. "Black and White" (inst.); 7. "For Less Than a Month" (한 달을 못 가서; CD only); 8. "You Are Not Here" (너만 없다; CD only) | 72 | —N/a |
| O Esca Viatorum (나그네의 양식) | Released: July 22, 2020; Label: Soul Sting; Format: CD, digital download; Track listing: 1. "I Will Worship You" (예배합니다); 2. "O Esca Viatorum" (나그네의 양식); 3. "An Alabaster Vial of Perfume" (내게 있는 향유 옥합); 4. "I'd Rather Have Jesus Than Silver and Gold" (주 예수 보다 더 귀한 것은 없네); 5. "I Must Tell Jesus All of My Trials" (내 모든 시험 무거운 짐을); 6. "On My Way Back" (회로) | —N/a | —N/a |

=== Singles ===
| Title | Year | Peak chart positions | Album |
| Title | Year | KOR | Album |
|---|---|---|---|
| "365 Days" (365일) | 2009 | 43 | After The Love Has Gone |
| "Hey Mr." (Hey 미스터) | 2010 | 81 | Non-album single |
| "The Unwritten Legend" (전설속의 누군가처럼) with Navi, Tom Tom | 2010 | 95 | 20th Anniversary Shin Seung Hun |
| "I Tried Everything" (별 짓 다해봤는데) | 2011 | 23 | Non-album singles |
| "Rice Bowl" (밥그릇) | 2011 | 89 | Non-album singles |
| "If I Confess, You'll be Surprised" (내가 고백을 하면 깜짝 놀랄거야) | 2011 | 75 | Non-album singles |
| "I'll Be Damned" (뭐 이런게 다 있어) | 2011 | 11 | Soul-Ri: A Village with Soul |
| "Don't Act Countrified" (촌스럽게 굴지마) feat. Yong Jun-hyung | 2011 | 4 | Soul-Ri: A Village with Soul |
| "Selfish" (이기적이야) | 2013 | 33 | Eraser |
| "Eraser" (지우개) | 2013 | 11 | Eraser |
| "Rainy Gomoryeong" (비 내리는 고모령) feat. Double K, Yankie | 2013 | 88 | Non-album single |
| "Do You Remember?" (그땐 그랬지) with C-Clown | 2013 | 25 | Shaking Heart |
| "I Love You" with Yim Jae-beom | 2013 | 8 | Non-album singles |
| "Because of Me" (나 때문에) | 2014 | 14 | Non-album singles |
| "Tears Keep Falling" (자꾸 눈물이 납니다) | 2014 | 33 | Non-album singles |
| "What Is Luv" feat. Loco | 2014 | 54 | Non-album singles |
| "Let Me Say First" (여자가 먼저) | 2014 | 69 | Non-album singles |
| "Song Can't Lie" (노래는 거짓말을 못해요) | 2014 | 90 | Turning Point |
| "Pung Pung" (펑펑) | 2014 | 22 | Turning Point |
| "As If Nothing Happened" (아무일 없었다는 듯) with Wheesung | 2014 | 14 | Non-album singles |
| "Goodbye Mr. Kim" (잘가요 Mr. Kim) feat. LE | 2015 | — | Non-album singles |
| "Heaven's Song" | 2015 | — | The Message Part 2 |
| "Shining Is Blue" with Yoo Jun-sang | 2015 | — | White Hole |
| "I, Me" (내가, 나에게) | 2015 | — | White Hole |
| "Say Say Say" with Chunri | 2015 | — | Non-album singles |
| "Poom" (품) with Horan | 2016 | — | Non-album singles |
| "Suddenly" (또 생각이 나서) with Im Chang-jung | 2016 | 22 | Non-album singles |
| "Winter Wonderland" | 2016 | — | Non-album singles |
| "You Are Not Here" (너만 없다) with Yesung | 2017 | 95 | Non-album singles |
| "Cherry Blossom Road" (벚꽃 길) | 2017 | — | Non-album singles |
| "Don't Speak" with Cheetah | 2017 | — | Non-album singles |
| "For Less Than a Month" (한 달을 못 가서) with Paul Kim | 2017 | — | Non-album singles |
| "No Way" (말이 되니) | 2017 | — | Expand |
| "Only You" (너만) | 2018 | — | Non-album singles |
| "Proposal" (청혼) | 2018 | — | Non-album singles |
| "It Was You" (너였나 봐) | 2018 | — | Non-album singles |
| "Love Did Not End Yet" (사랑은 아직도 끝나지 않았네) | 2019 | — | Non-album singles |
| "On My Way Back" (회로) with Sohyang | 2020 | — | Non-album singles |
| "Azaleas" (진달래꽃 피었습니다) | 2025 | 158 | Non-album singles |
"—" denotes release did not chart.

=== Soundtrack appearances ===
| Title | Year | Peak chart positions | Album |
| Title | Year | KOR | Album |
|---|---|---|---|
| "All of a Sudden" (울컥) | 2009 | No data | Terroir OST |
| "Come On, Antique!" | 2009 | No data | Antique OST |
| "A Dream Comes True" (돌멩이의 꿈) feat. RP-T | 2009 | No data | A Dream Comes True OST |
| "Hurt" (상처) | 2012 | — | Rooftop Prince OST |
| "Carry On" | 2012 | 16 | Faith OST |
| "In My Dream" | 2013 | 45 | Empire of Gold OST |
| "The Vow" (서약) | 2014 | 46 | Golden Rainbow OST |
| "A Flower in the Rock" (돌 틈 꽃) | 2014 | 88 | Gunman in Joseon OST |
| "Give Me One Day" (하루만 내게 줘) | 2018 | — | My Only One OST |
| "Just Stay" | 2019 | — | Kill It OST |
"—" denotes release did not chart.

== Filmography ==
=== Television shows ===
| Year | Title | Notes |
|---|---|---|
| 2011–2015 | Immortal Songs 2 | Contestant |
| 2014 | Mnet 100 Second War | Contestant |
| 2016 | King of Mask Singer | Contestant (Episodes 79–80, 82, 84, 86) |
| 2022 | Goal Girls | Cast Member; Season 2 |

== Musical theater ==
| Year | Title | Role | Ref. |
|---|---|---|---|
| 2016 | Turandot (musical adaptation) | Turandot | |
| 2019 | Rebecca | Mrs. Danvers | |

== Awards ==
| Year | Award | Category | Result | Ref. |
|---|---|---|---|---|
| 2009 | Cyworld Digital Music Awards | Female Newcomer of the Year | Won | |
| 2012 | Hong Kong Asian-Pop Music Festival | Best Vocal Performance | Won | |
| 2012 | Hong Kong Asian-Pop Music Festival | Super Nova Award | Won | |
