= Leessang =

South Korean hip-hop duo

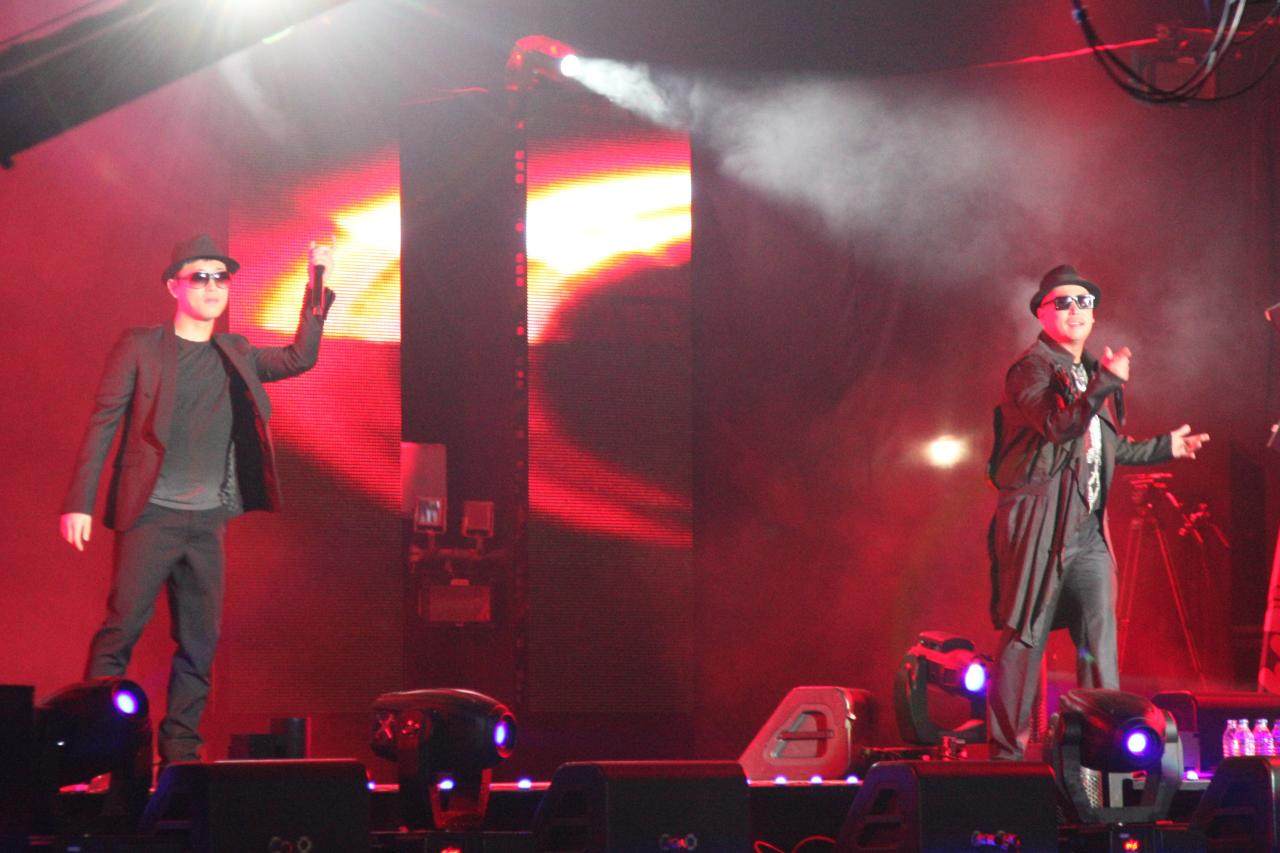

Background information
- Origin: Seoul, South Korea
- Genres: Hip hop, jazz rap
- Years active: 2002–2017
- Labels: Jungle Entertainment; Leessang Company
- Past members: Gary; Gil
- Website: leessangcompany.com

Korean name
- Hangul: 리쌍
- RR: Rissang
- MR: Rissang

Leessang (Korean: 리쌍) was a South Korean hip hop duo, composed of Kang Hee-gun ("Gary" or "Garie") and Gil Seong-joon ("Gil"). Formed in 2002, the duo has released eight albums to date: two self-titled records in 2002 and 2003, Library of Soul in 2005, Black Sun in 2007, Baekajeolhyeon (백아절현) in 2009, Hexagonal in late 2009, Asura Balbalta in 2011 and Unplugged in 2012. Their last three albums broke numerous records and guided their entry to the mainstream Korean music industry.

== Career ==
=== 1997–2001: Career beginnings ===
In 1997, Gary joined X-Teen, a hip hop group, where he met Gil. They released two albums. Gary later said that he had neither the looks nor the talent so they left the group. Gary and Gil then joined Honey Family. They released two successful albums in 1999 and 2000. The other members were Digitty, Miryo, Park Myung Hou, Jura, Young Poon, and Su-Jung. To date, the group is still acknowledged as one of the best hip hop groups of all time because of their unique blend of rapping styles.

Gary, Gil, and Diggity collaborated to form a "Leessam Trio" (sam means three in Korean), and released a compilation album called 2000 Korea in the year 2000. Diggity eventually left the group. Gil and Gary changed the name to "Leessang". Diggity later stated in an interview that part of the reason he left is because when success went to his head he felt like a celebrity.

=== 2002–04: Leessang of Honey Family and Jae,Gyebal ===
Gil managed to borrow 2 billion won to fund their first album. With no formal musical training, the duo learned as they were producing by spending 400 hours straight inside the studio. Through their efforts, they managed to produce 60 songs. On June 27, 2002, Leessang released their first album, Leessang of Honey Family. Their breakaway hit was the title track featuring Jung-in. The song, "Rush", which uses an identical baseline to "You Are Everything" by the Stylistics and was released one day after Nelly's Grammy winning song - "Dilemma", won the hip-hop music awards from the Mnet KM Music Video Festival. Many credited the perfect blend of Jung-in, Gil and Gary's voices as one of the reasons for the song's success. This was also the beginning of their long partnership with Jung-in. "Rush" remains in Leessang's repertoire to date.

They released their second album, Jae,Gyebal (재,계발) on May 22, 2003. Jung-in once again provided the female vocals for their second hit song "Leessang Blues", written and composed by Gary. When they made their "best of" album titled Leessang Special, a workflow was developed that has loosely remained the same. Gary writes most of the lyrics, Gil does the music, and they both produce. Despite their success, they were still largely underground. Gary said in episode 98 of Strong Heart that they were so "unknown" that they were blocked by security when they came to receive their first major award.

=== 2005–10: Mainstream breakthrough ===
Their mainstream breakthrough happened when they released their third studio album Library of Soul on October 14, 2005. On May 17, 2007, their fourth album Black Sun was released. Leessang said that every song on the album tells a story of their life. They eventually won Cyworld Digital Music Awards: Song of the Month when the song stayed on the charts for 4 straight weeks.

It took them two years to release their fifth album, Baekajeolhyeon. The title track, "Champion", was dedicated to boxer Yo-Sam Choi, who was very close to Gary and Gil. Choi died on the ring in 2008. Gary decided to direct the music video, which was a move that set the precedent on all their succeeding music videos.

In 2009, Leessang signed with a new label Jungle Entertainment, founded by hip-hop legend Tiger J.K. (a.k.a. Drunken Tiger). It was later reported that Jungle is one of the few labels that give their artists more artistic control and gives probably the highest percentage in rights and royalties. Leessang and Ryoo Seung-Bum toured to Sydney, Australia for the first time in this year with show producer Leonard Dela Torre.

They released their sixth album, Hexagonal on October 6, 2009. The lead single, "Girl Who Can't Break-Up and Boy Who Can't Leave" featured Jung-in once more. The song went straight to No. 1 on KBS Music Bank where it stayed at No. 1 for three weeks straight. Another song in the album, "Let's Meet Now", was a collaboration with the band Jang Gi Hwa and Faces. It was used for Fish & Grill's TV Commercial.

=== 2011–17: Asura Balbalta, Unplugged and disbandment ===
Leessang's seventh album, Asura Balbalta, was released August 25, 2011. The title song, "I Turned off the TV", occupied the top position on Billboard's K-Pop Hot 100, and every other song from the album charted. "I Turned off the TV" was banned by all TV networks and radio stations because of explicit sexual content. However, it was reported to earn US$500,000 within the first month of release. Gary later said that they were becoming more comfortable talking about different sensitive issues as they age.

In 2011, LeeSsang embarked on their first nationwide solo tour titled Leessang Theatre. Gary revealed on Strong Heart (TV series) that the inspiration to his songs "Leessang Blues", "I'm Not Laughing", "Ballerino", "Girl Who Can't Break up, Boy Who Can't Leave" and "You're the Answer to a Guy Like Me" was his ex-girlfriend of almost 7 years.

In May 2012, Leessang released their eighth album, Unplugged. It was a fulfillment of their long time dream to collaborate with different artists from different genres, using a full band via an analogue recording. That same month, the duo announced that they created Leessang Company. They intended to create live events that were geared towards putting up quality and innovative live shows. Jungle Entertainment remains their label but they will produce and direct all their live shows under the new company.

On July 15, 2012, Gary and Gil were both featured on Psy's "Seventy Seven 101." Psy, Kim Jin Pyo, and Leessang all worked together on the song. The song and the album were restricted because of explicit lyrics in "Seventy Seven 101".

In December 2012, they performed a one-night only show with the band YB with whom they collaborated for the song "Someday", "Run" and "Madman". After strong public demand, they decided to do a short nationwide tour with YB. They also went to their first U.S. Tour. They had a show in New York and Los Angeles, and both were sold out.

On July 14, 2015, Leessang reached the top of multiple charts with their single "Kaleidoscope" featuring Mi Woo.

On April 6, 2017, it was reported that they may have disbanded as they have parted their own ways and work solely, after establishing their own music labels.

== Reputation and critical response ==
Leessang has been respected even before their mainstream success despite signing with a fairly non-mainstream label, rather than a well-known large K-pop entertainment company. Leessang are known to write and produce their own songs, direct their music videos, and keeping their private lives separate from their professional work. They are also credited for being one of the few artists to help non-idol singers and musicians get some attention by the mainstream public. They are often regarded as a physically unappealing group, especially in the variety shows they partake in. However, since the success of Hexagonal, Asura Balbalta and Unplugged, they have been known to support themselves despite not receiving media attention based on their attractive looks. Gary is known for his off-tempo rapping while Gil's voice is nationally known for its huskier approach. They are also widely regarded for their live performances. They are known to receive constant favorable reviews for their live performances and are particularly known for showing personal stories of their own upbringing.

== Discography ==
=== Studio albums ===
Title	Album details	Peak chart positions	Sales
Title	Album details	KOR	Sales
Leessang of Honey Family	Released: June 26, 2002; Label: Doo Republic; Format: CD, cassette, digital download	12	KOR: 53,406
Jae, Gyebal	Released: May 22, 2003; Label: Doo Republic; Format: CD, cassette, digital download	18	KOR: 43,961
Library of Soul	Released: October 13, 2005; Label: J-Entercom; Format: CD, cassette, digital download	—	—N/a
Black Sun	Released: May 15, 2007; Label: J-Entercom; Format: CD, digital download	—	—N/a
Baekahjeolhyun	Released: January 8, 2009; Label: J-Entercom; Format: CD, digital download	No data	No data
Hexagonal	Released: October 6, 2009; Label: Jungle Entertainment; Format: CD, digital download	23	No data
Asura Balbalta	Released: August 25, 2011; Label: Jungle Entertainment; Format: CD, digital download	2	KOR: 27,755
Unplugged	Released: May 25, 2012; Label: Jungle Entertainment; Format: CD, digital download	6	KOR: 10,783
"—" denotes release did not chart.

=== Compilation albums ===
Title	Album details	Peak chart positions	Sales
Title	Album details	KOR	Sales
Leessang, Special Jungin	Released: March 11, 2004; Label: Doo Republic; Format: CD, cassette, digital download	24	KOR: 17,673

=== Singles ===
Title	Year	Peak chart positions	Sales	Album
Title	Year	KOR	Sales	Album
"Rush" feat. Jung-in	2002	No data	No data	Leessang Of Honey Family
"Fly High" feat. Jung-in, Hareem	2003	No data	No data	Jae, Gyebal
"Leessang Blues" feat. Jung-in	2003	No data	No data	Jae, Gyebal
"I'm Not Laughing" (내가 웃는게 아니야) feat. Ali	2005	No data	No data	Library of Soul
"Clown" (광대) feat. Big Mama King	2005	No data	No data	Library of Soul
"Ballerino" feat. Ali	2007	No data	No data	Black Sun
"Champion" (챔피언) feat. Jung-in	2009	No data	No data	Baekahjeolhyun
"Girl Who Can't Break Up, Guy Who Can't Leave" (헤어지지 못하는 여자, 떠나가지 못하는 남자) feat. Jung-in	2009	No data	No data	Hexagonal
"Let's Meet Now" (우리 지금 만나) feat. Kiha & The Faces	2009	53	No data	Hexagonal
"Grand Final" feat. Jung-in, MC Naryu	2011	3	KOR: 1,411,819	Non-album single
"Turned off the TV" (TV를 껐네) feat. Yoon Mi-rae, Kwon Jung-yeol of 10cm	2011	1	KOR: 3,081,880	Asura Balbalta
"You're The Answer to a Guy Like Me" (나란 놈은 답은 너다) feat. Hareem	2011	2	KOR: 2,143,098	Asura Balbalta
"My Love" (너에게 배운다)	2012	4	KOR: 929,204	Unplugged
"Someday" feat. Yoon Do-hyun	2012	7	KOR: 390,755	Unplugged
"Hard To Be Happy" (겸손은 힘들어)	2012	6	KOR: 649,803	Unplugged
"Pursuing the Happiness"(행복을 찾아서) feat. Jo Hyuna of Urban Zakapa	2012	26	KOR: 192,587	Unplugged
"MadMan" feat. YB	2012	48	KOR: 127,762	Non-album singles
"Tears" (눈물) feat. Eugene of The SeeYa	2013	1	KOR: 1,806,317	Non-album singles
"Kaleidoscope" (주마등) feat. Miwoo	2015	3	KOR: 423,189	Non-album singles

=== Soundtrack appearances ===
Title	Year	Album
"Who Are You Living For?" (누구를 위한 삶인가)	2006	Bloody Tie OST
"Dachimawa Lee" (다찌마와 리) with Epik High	2008	Dachimawa Lee OST

== Awards ==
List of awards and nominations received by Leessang
Award ceremony	Year	Category	Nominee / Work	Result	Ref.
Cyworld Digital Music Awards	2007	Song of the Month – June	"Ballerino" feat. Ali	Won	
Cyworld Digital Music Awards	2009	Best Collaboration	"Girl Who Can't Break Up, Guy Who Can't Leave" (feat. Jung In)	Won	
Cyworld Digital Music Awards	2009	Song of the Month – October	"Girl Who Can't Break Up, Guy Who Can't Leave" (feat. Jung In)	Won	
Cyworld Digital Music Awards	2009	Top 10 Award (Bonsang)	"Girl Who Can't Break Up, Guy Who Can't Leave" (feat. Jung In)	Won	
Cyworld Digital Music Awards	2011	Song of the Month – August	"Turned off the TV" (feat. Yoon Mi-rae & 10cm)	Won	
MAMA Awards	2002	Best Hip Hop Performance	"Rush"	Won	
MAMA Awards	2003	Best Hip Hop Performance	"Leessang Blues"	Nominated	
MAMA Awards	2005	Best Hip Hop Performance	"I'm Not Laughing"	Nominated	
MAMA Awards	2007	Best Hip Hop Performance	"Ballerino" feat. Ali	Nominated	
MAMA Awards	2007	Best Music Video	"Ballerino" feat. Ali	Nominated	
MAMA Awards	2009	Best Hip Hop Performance	"Girl Who Can't Break Up, Guy Who Can't Leave" (feat. Jung In)	Won	
MAMA Awards	2009	Best Music Video	"Girl Who Can't Break Up, Guy Who Can't Leave" (feat. Jung In)	Nominated	
MAMA Awards	2011	Best Rap Performance	"Turned off the TV" (feat. Yoon Mi-rae & 10cm)	Won	
MAMA Awards	2011	Song of the Year (Daesang)	"Turned off the TV" (feat. Yoon Mi-rae & 10cm)	Nominated	
Melon Music Awards	2009	Sudden Rise of the Year	Leessang	Won	
Melon Music Awards	2009	Current Stream Song Award	"Girl Who Can't Break Up, Guy Who Can't Leave" (feat. Jung In)	Nominated	
Melon Music Awards	2011	Top 10 Artists (Bonsang)	Leessang	Won	
Melon Music Awards	2011	Album of the Year (Daesang)	Asura Balbalta	Nominated	
Melon Music Awards	2011	Artist of the Year (Daesang)	Leessang	Nominated	
