= Cyworld Digital Music Awards =

South Korean music awards ceremony

- Awarded for: Excellence in music
- Country: South Korea
- Presented by: Cyworld
- First award: 2006
- Final award: 2013
- Website: http://music.cyworld.com/

The Cyworld Digital Music Awards (Korean: 싸이월드 디지털 뮤직 어워드) was a South Korean music awards ceremony. It was established in 2006 to recognize songs with the largest monthly digital sales on the Cyworld social network service. Monthly awards were also given to popular songs by new artists, popular songs by international artists, and critically acclaimed songs (which received awards called "Tam Eum Mania"). Annual awards were given for the most popular songs of 2009 and 2010.

== Annual award winners ==
Girl group 2NE1 was the biggest winner at the 2009 Cyworld Digital Music Awards, earning four awards including Artist of the Year and Song of the Year. At the 2010 awards, 4Men won Artist of the Year, while 2AM won Song of the Year. The complete list of winners for both years is below.

=== Artist of the Year ===
Year	Artist	Song
2009	2NE1	"I Don't Care"
2010	4Men	"I Can't" (못해)
2011	IU	"Good Day"

=== Song of the Year ===
Year	Artist	Song
2009	2NE1	"I Don't Care"
2010	2AM	"Can't Let You Go Even If I Die"

=== Rookie Award ===
Year	Artist	Song
2009	2NE1 (group)	"I Don't Care"
2009	Seo In-guk (male)	"Calling You" (부른다)
2009	Ali (female)	"365 Days" (365일)
2010	CNBLUE	"I'm a Loner"

=== Tam Eum Mania Award ===
Year	Artist	Song
2009	Kiha & The Faces	"The Moon Is Waxing, Let's Go"
2010	Broccoli, You Too	"Even I Love You Can't Help"

=== Original Soundtrack Award ===
Year	Artist	Song
2009	SS501	"Because I'm Stupid" (Boys Over Flowers OST)
2010	Yesung	"It Has To Be You" (Cinderella's Stepsister OST)

=== Composer Award ===
Year	Artist	Song
2009	Jo Yong-su	"No One Else" by Lee Seung-chul
2010	Jo Yong-su	"Bubble Love" by MC Mong & Seo In-young

=== Best 10 Award ===
Year	Artist	Song
2009	Davichi	"8282"
2009	Leessang	"Girl Who Can't Break Up, Guy Who Can't Leave" feat. Jung-in
2009	Brown Eyed Girls	"Abracadabra"
2009	Big Bang	"Hallelujah"
2009	Girls' Generation	"Gee"
2009	G-Dragon	"Heartbreaker"
2009	MC Mong	"Indian Boy"
2009	2NE1	"I Don't Care"
2009	2PM	"Heartbeat"
2009	8Eight	"Without a Heart" (심장이 없어)

=== Other awards ===
Year	Award	Recipient	Song
2009	Hall of Fame Award	Park Hyo-shin	"Snow Flower" (눈의 꽃)
2009	Collaboration Award	Jung-in	"Girl Who Can't Break Up, Guy Who Can't Leave" by Leessang
2009	Ting's Choice Award	G-Dragon	"Heartbreaker"
2009	Distribution Company Award (Domestic)	Mnet Media	—N/a
2009	Distribution Company Award (Overseas)	Universal Music Korea	—N/a
2010	International Artist Award	Jason Mraz	"Geek in the Pink"
2011	Best Top Seller Artist	IU	"Good Day"

== Monthly award winners ==
=== 2006 ===
Month	Song of the Month		Rookie of the Month	
Month	Artist	Song	Artist	Song
July	Brown Eyed Girls & Cho PD	"Hold The Line"	Suho feat. Kim Tae-woo	"Spring, Summer, Fall...Winter" (봄 여름 가을...겨울)
August	Turtles	"Airplane"	Sweet Sorrow	"I Still Think I Love You" (아무리 생각해도 난 너를)
September	MC the Max	"Looking for Love" (사랑을 찾아서)	Zhang Liyin & XIA	"Tiimeless"
October	Eru & Daylight	"Black Glasses" (까만안경)	Big Bang	"La La La"
November	Sung Si-kyung	"On the Street" (거리에서)	Yoon Hyung-Ryul	"Memories of the Tree" (기억의 나무)
December	Kim Ah-joong	"Maria"	The Lug	"Sin" (죄)

=== 2007 ===
Month	Song of the Month		Rookie of the Month	
Month	Artist	Song	Artist	Song
January	Eru	"White Snow" (흰눈)	PK Heman feat. Lee Ji-hye	"Evergreen"
February	Epik High	"Fan"	Wonder Girls	"Irony"
March	Ivy feat. Wheesung	"Sonata of Temptation" (유혹의 소나타)	Magolpy	"Flying Girl" (비행소녀)
April	Magolpy	"Flying Girl" (비행소녀)	Younha	"Password 486" (비밀번호 486)
May	Yangpa	"Love...What Is It?" (사랑...그게 뭔데)	1sagain feat. Jubora	"After Love" (이별후애)
June	Leessang feat. Ali	"Ballerino"	—N/a	
July	MC Mong feat. Kim Tae-woo	"So Fresh"	Kara	"If You Wanna"
August	Big Bang	"Lies"	Girls' Generation	"Into the New World"
September	BigBang	"Lies"	8Eight	"Forget About Love and Sing" (사랑을 잃고 난 노래하네)
October	Wonder Girls	"Tell Me"	Sunny Hill	"Ring Back Tone" (통화 연결음)
November	AnyBand	"Talk Play Love"	Kim Dong Hee	"You You" (그대를 그대를)
December	BigBang	"Last Farewell"	Gavy Queens	"Two Letters" (두글자)

=== 2008 ===
Month	Song of the Month		Rookie of the Month	
Month	Artist	Song	Artist	Song
January	Haha	"You Are My Destiny" (너는 내 운명)	Joo	"Because of a Man" (남자 때문에)
February	Taeyeon	"If" (만약에)	Davichi	"I Love You Even Though I Hate You" (미워도 사랑하니까)
March	Mighty Mouth feat. Yoon Eun-hye	"I Love You" (사랑해)	Mighty Mouth feat. Yoon Eun-hye	"I Love You" (사랑해)
April	Kim Dong-ryul	"Like a Child" (아이처럼)	Kim Jong-wook	"Only You" (그대만이)
May	Alex Chu	"Flower Pot" (화분)	Shinee	"Replay"
June	Wonder Girls	"So Hot"	Mario	"Good Bye"
July	Davichi	"Love and War" (사랑과 전쟁)	2AM	"This Song" (이노래)
August	Big Bang	"Stand Up"	Tau & Mino feat. Ju	"Our Happy Time" (우리들의 행복한 시간)
September	Wonder Girls	"Nobody"	2PM	"10 Out of 10"
October	Wonder Girls	"Nobody"	Pastel Blue feat. Jinju & Mino	"Miss You" (그리워서)
November	BigBang	"Sunset Glow" (붉은 노을)	Untouchable feat. Hwayobi	"It's Okay"
December	Baek Ji-young	"Like Being Shot By a Bullet" (총맞은 것처럼)	Miss S feat. Nam Gyu-ri	"Don't Cheat" (바람피지마)

=== 2009 ===
Month	Song of the Month		Rookie of the Month		International Artist of the Month		Tam Eum Mania	
Month	Artist	Song	Artist	Song	Artist	Song	Artist	Song
January	Girls' Generation	"Gee"	Kikiyuna	"Paradise"	—N/a		—N/a	
February	SS501	"Because I'm Stupid" (내 머리가 나빠서)	Maydoni feat. 2AM	"Mola ing" (몰라 ing)	Lily Allen	"Fuck You"	Ji-sun of Loveholics	"Bye, Heart" (안녕 마음아)
March	Davichi	"8282"	Brand New Day	"Livable" (살만해)	Craig David	"Insomnia"	Kiha & The Faces	"The Moon is Waxing, Let's Go" (달이 차오른다, 가자)
April	Big Bang & 2NE1	"Lollipop"	After School	"Diva"	Flo Rida feat. Ne-Yo	"Be On You"	Epik High feat. MYK	"Map The Soul"
May	2NE1	"Fire"	2NE1	"Fire"	Black Eyed Peas	"Boom Boom Pow"	Park Ji-yoon	"Faded Memory" (바래진 기억에)
June	Outsider	"Loner" (외톨이)	4Minute	"Hot Issue"	Chrisette Michele feat. Ne-Yo	"What You Do"	No Reply	"The Way You Walk" (그대 걷던 길)
July	2NE1	"I Don't Care"	Supreme Team feat. Yoon Mi-rae	"Knowing Me" (나만 모르게)	MYMP	"Say You Love Me"	Yoon Sang	"I Was in Your Eyes" (그 눈 속엔 내가)
August	Brown Eyed Girls	"Abracadabra"	T-ara	"Lie"	MYMP	"Say You Love Me"	Ra.D	"I'm In Love"
September	G-Dragon	"Heartbreaker"	f(x)	"La Cha Ta"	Beyoncé	"Honestly"	Taru	"Night Flying"
October	Leessang feat. Jung-in	"Girl Who Can't Break Up, Guy Who Can't Leave" (헤어지지 못하는 여자, 떠나가지 못하는 남자)	Seo In-guk	"Calling You" (부른다)	Beyoncé	"Honestly"	Lucite Tokki	"B.I.S.H"
November	Park Bom	"You and I"	December	"True Love..." (사랑 참…)	50 Cent feat. Ne-Yo	"Baby By Me"	Astro Bits	"All I Wanna Feeling"
December	Gain & Jo Kwon	"I Happen to Love You"	Beast	"Mystery"	Mariah Carey	"All I Want for Christmas Is You"	Lucid Fall	"An Ordinary Man" (평범한 사람)

=== 2010 ===
Month	Song of the Month		Rookie of the Month		International Artist of the Month		Tam Eum Mania	
Month	Artist	Song	Artist	Song	Artist	Song	Artist	Song
January	Gain & Jo Kwon	"I Happen to Love You"	CNBLUE	"I'm a Loner"	Kesha	"Tik Tok"	Kim Yeon-woo	"Nuptial Song" (축가)
February	2AM	"Can't Let You Go Even If I Die"	Ab Avenue	"Love Together" (사랑 둘이서)	Jason Mraz	"Geek in the Pink"	Joo Hyeong-jin	"Let's Break Up" (헤어지자고)
March	MC Mong & Seo In-young	"Bubble Love"	Songcry	"Promise" (약속)	B.o.B feat. Bruno Mars	"Nothin' on You"	EZ Hyoung	"The Miracle of Spring" (봄의 기적)
April	Yesung	"It Has to be You" (너 아니면 안돼)	Gil Hak-mi	"Super Soul"	B.o.B feat. Bruno Mars	"Nothin' on You"	Jung Jae-hyung	"Path" (오솔길)
May	Hot Potato	"Confession" (고백)	Soya 'n Sun	"Smiling Goodbye" (웃으며 안녕)	B.o.B feat. Bruno Mars	"Nothin' on You"	Epitone Project feat. Cho Ye-jin	"Twinkle Twinkle" (반짝반짝 빛나는)
June	IU & Lim Seul-ong	"Nagging"	Sistar	"Push Push"	B.o.B feat. Jay Park	"Nothin' on You"	3rd Coast	"Reason"
July	Miss A	"Bad Girl Good Girl"	Miss A	"Bad Girl Good Girl"	Eminem feat. Rihanna	"Love the Way You Lie"	Brown Eyed Soul	"Can't Stop Lovin' You"
August	Homme	"I Was Able to Eat Well" (밥만 잘 먹더라)	G.NA & Rain	"What I Want to Do Once I Have a Lover"	Eminem feat. Rihanna	"Love the Way You Lie"	10cm	"Americano"
September	2NE1	"Go Away"	Rainbow	"A"	Kelly Clarkson	"Because of You"	Jaejoo Boys	"To My Childhood" (유년에게)
October	Supreme Team & Youngjun	"Then Then Then" (그땐 그땐 그땐)	Kang Seung-yoon feat. Swings	"Instinctively" (본능적으로)	Far East Movement	"Like a G6"	Groove All Stars	"Hang On" (기다려)
November	Huh Gak	"As Always" (언제나)	Huh Gak	"As Always" (언제나)	Far East Movement	"Like a G6"	Broccoli, You Too	"Even I Love You Can't Help" (사랑한다는 말로도 위로가 되지 않는)
December	IU	"Good Day"	Jo Moon-geun	"It's You" (너라는 걸)	Yolanda Be Cool & DCUP	"We No Speak Americano"	Pinodyne feat. Nuksubshanee, Set Byul & DJ Tiz	"Clover" (클로버)

=== 2011 ===
Month	Song of the Month		Rookie of the Month		International Artist of the Month		Tam Eum Mania	
Month	Artist	Song	Artist	Song	Artist	Song	Artist	Song
January	Hyun Bin	"That Man" (그남자)	The Hayan feat. No Noo	"Confession Practice" (고백 연습)	Yolanda Be Cool & DCUP	"We No Speak Americano"	Yoon Jong-shin feat. Kim Kwang-min	"Happy New Year...With You"
February	Kim Soo-Hyun	"Dreaming"	Kim Bo-kyung	"Day By Day" (하루하루)	Yolanda Be Cool & DCUP	"We No Speak Americano"	10cm	"Love In The Milky Way Cafe" (사랑은 은하수 다방에서)
March	K.Will	"My Heart Beating" (가슴이 뛴다)	J-Cera	"Endless Love" (언제나 사랑해)	Yolanda Be Cool & DCUP	"We No Speak Americano"	Tete	"Romantico"
April	CNBLUE	"Intuition" (직감)	Kim Greem	"There Was Only You" (너 밖엔 없더라)	Yolanda Be Cool & DCUP	"We No Speak Americano"	Neon Bunny	"Can't Stop Thinking About You"
May	2NE1	"Lonely"	Geeks	"Officially Missing You"	David Guetta feat. Flo Rida & Nicki Minaj	"Where Them Girls At"	Rooftop Moonlight	"None The Better or Courage" (없는게 메리트)
June	4Men	"Once While Living" (살다가 한번쯤)	BGH to feat. Eunjung	"I Love You! 'Always' Be Happy!" (사랑해! '항상' 행복해!)	Hope feat. Jason Mraz	"Love Love Love"	Urban Zakapa	"My Love" (그날에 우리)
July	GG (G-Dragon & Park Myeong-su) feat. Park Bom	"I Cheated" (바람났어)	Don Spike & Naul	"Hello"	Maroon 5 feat. Christina Aguilera	"Moves Like Jagger"	Park Asher	"On the Road Again" (다시 그 길 위를)
August	Leessang feat. Yoon Mi-rae & 10cm	"Turned Off The TV" (TV를 껐네)	Lee Bo-ram feat. Mino of Freestyle	"Two Fools" (두 바보)	Maroon 5 feat. Christina Aguilera	"Moves Like Jagger"	Yi Song-yul	"Not Coming Back" (돌아오지 않아)
September	Davichi	"Don't Say Goodbye" (안녕이라고 말하지마)	Maji	"Common Woman" (흔한 여자)	LMFAO feat. Lauren Bennett & GoonRock	"Party Rock Anthem"	Pia	"B.E.C.K"
October	Busker Busker	"Tokyo Girl" (동경소녀)	Busker Busker	"Tokyo Girl" (동경소녀)	Bueno Clinic feat. Mik W.	"Sex Appeal"	Acoustic Collabo	"You and I" (그대와 나, 설레임)
November	Noel	"I Miss You" (그리워 그리워)	Ulala Session	"West Sky" (서쪽 하늘)	Bueno Clinic feat. Mik W.	"Sex Appeal"	Idiotape	"Even Floor"
December	IU	"You & I"	Phantom	"Hole in Your Face" (얼굴 뚫어지겠다)	Mariah Carey	"All I Want for Christmas Is You"	Mystery Curtain	"The End of Winter" (겨울의 끝)

=== 2012 ===
Month	Song of the Month		Rookie of the Month		International Artist of the Month		Tam Eum Mania	
Month	Artist	Song	Artist	Song	Artist	Song	Artist	Song
January	Dynamic Duo	"Without You"	Fat Cat	"Is Being Pretty Everything?" (예쁜게 다니)	LMFAO, Steve Aoki, Nervo	"Livin' My Love"	Manggakwha	"You're Me" (너는 날)
February	Big Bang	"Blue"	Ailee	"Heaven"	Rachael Yamagata	"Be Be Your Love"	Clazzi, Yi Sung-yol, MYK	"Love & Hate"
March	BigBang	"Fantastic Baby"	Blueberry	"You're My Love and Destiny" (넌 내애인이고 사랑이고 운명이야)	Maroon 5 feat. Christina Aguilera	"Moves Like Jagger"	Bye Bye Sea	"Luminous Star" (야광별)
April	Busker Busker	"Cherry Blossom Ending"	Macchiato feat. Panini	"You're Mine, You're My Man" (넌 내꺼 넌 내 남자)	Maroon 5 feat. Wiz Khalifa	"Payphone"	Soran	"Don't Lose Weight" (살빼지 마요)
May	IU	"Peach"	Brave Guys feat. Seo Su-min	"I Don't Care"	Che'Nelle	"Baby I Love You"	Peppertones	"Bikini"
June	Verbal Jint feat. 10cm	"Good Morning"	Juniel feat. Jung Yong-hwa	"Fool" (바보)	Che'Nelle	"Baby I Love You"	Coffee Boy	"Good Night" (오늘도 굿나잇)
July	Psy	"Gangnam Style"	BtoB & U Sung-eun	"Love Virus" (사랑병)	Maroon 5	"One More Night"	E9	"Peter Pan Syndrome"
August	Psy	"Gangnam Style"	9 Seconds	"Bastard" (문디가시나)	Maroon 5	"One More Night"	Kim Ji-soo & Vanilla Acoustic	"Sunglasses"
September	Jung Eun-ji & Seo In-guk	"All For You"	BtoB	"Wow"	Bruno Mars	"The Lazy Song"	Achime	"Overcome"
October	Epik High feat. Lee Hi	"It's Cold" (춥다)	Roy Kim & Jung Joon-young	"Becoming Dust" (먼지가 되어)	Maroon 5	"One More Night"	Urban Corner	"As If It Means Nothing" (아무렇지 않은 듯)
November	Geeks & Soyou	"Officially Missing You, Too"	DosirockK feat. Leeseul	"Lies" (거짓말)	Jeff Bernat	"Call You Mine"	Primary feat. E Sens	"Poison" (독)
December	Lee Seung-gi	"Forest" (숲)	Akdong Musician	"You are Attractive" (매력있어)	Mariah Carey	"All I Want for Christmas Is You"	Forest of Breath	"Come to Meet" (마중 나갈게)

=== 2013 ===
Month	Song of the Month		Rookie of the Month		International Artist of the Month		Tam Eum Mania	
Month	Artist	Song	Artist	Song	Artist	Song	Artist	Song
January	Kim Bo-kyung	"Don't Think You're Alone" (혼자라고 생각말기)	Speed feat. Park Bo-young	"It's Over"	Jeff Bernat	"Call You Mine"	eAeon	"My Little Piggy"
February	Sistar19	"Gone Not Around Any Longer"	Airplane	"So Pretty" (예쁘다)	Jeff Bernat	"Call You Mine"	Clazziquai	"Love Recipe"
March	Busker Busker	"Cherry Blossom Ending"	Ladies' Code	"Bad Girl"	Jeff Bernat	"Call You Mine"	Jinbo	"Fantasy"
April	Psy	"Gentleman"	Roy Kim	"Bom Bom Bom"	Jeff Bernat	"Call You Mine"	EZ Hyoung	"Nice Flight"
May	Roy Kim	"Bom Bom Bom"	Grey Dog feat. Hye-min	"A Little More" (조금만 더)	Jeff Bernat	"Call You Mine"	Urban Zakapa	"Just a Little Bit" (그냥 조금)

== See also ==
- Cyworld
- SK Telecom
