= Yoon Mi-rae =

South Korean-American rapper and singer-songwriter (born 1981)

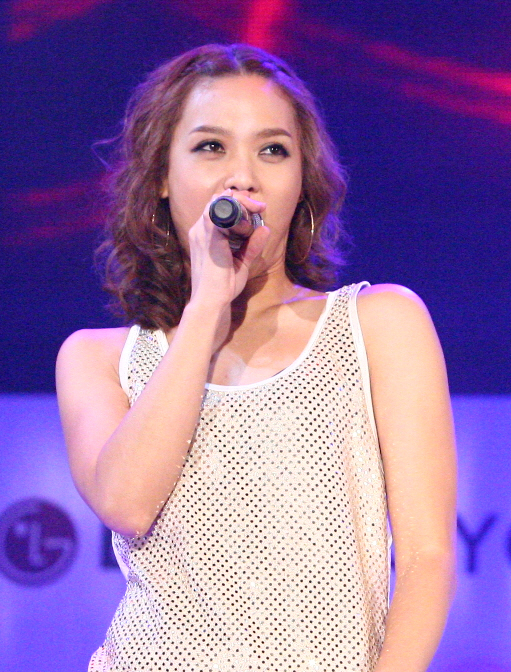
- Yoon in October 2011

Background information
- Also known as: Yoonmirae, Tasha, Baby Tasha, T
- Born: Natasha Shanta Reid; May 31, 1981 (age 45); Fort Hood, Texas, U.S.
- Origin: Seoul, South Korea
- Genres: Hip hop; R&B
- Occupations: Rapper; singer; songwriter; producer
- Years active: 1997–present
- Labels: World Music Entertainment; Jungle Entertainment; Feel Ghood Music; Avex Trax
- Member of: MFBTY
- Formerly of: Uptown
- Spouse: Tiger JK (m. 2007)
- Children: 1

Korean name
- Hangul: 윤미래
- Hanja: 尹未來
- RR: Yun Mirae
- MR: Yun Mirae

Natasha Shanta Reid (born May 31, 1981), better known by her Korean name Yoon Mi-rae (Korean: 윤미래), often stylized as Yoonmirae, is an American-born based South Korean rapper, singer, songwriter, and producer, who is also a member of Korean hip hop trio MFBTY.

== Biography ==
=== Early life and education ===
Yoon was born on May 31, 1981, in Fort Hood, Texas, to a South Korean mother and an African-American father. Her father had been a radio D.J. while serving with the U.S. military in South Korea in the district of Uijeongbu. Yoon's father cites his record collection as an influence to pursue her music career. After she moved to South Korea as a child, she often faced discrimination because of her mixed heritage. Yoon dropped out of school at age fifteen and later took a high school equivalence examination.

=== Discovery, Uptown and Tashannie ===
Yoon was discovered in 1995 when she accompanied a friend to an audition for a new Korean hip hop group. She did not audition herself, but a World Records representative heard her singing outside of the audition room and signed her to join a new group called Uptown. The group debuted in 1997, when Yoon was 16.

In 1999, she also formed hip hop and R&B duo "Tashannie" with rapper Lee Soo-a, who used the stage name "Annie". They released one album, called Parallel Prophecies. Yoon's name, Natasha, was hard for South Koreans to pronounce, so she used the name "Tasha," in order to better appeal to the intended audience. Uptown broke up in 2000 after several group members were arrested on drug charges. Yoon's then-boyfriend, rapper Tiger JK, was also arrested and spent a month and a half in jail. Yoon herself went into hiding during that period.

=== Solo career and MFBTY ===
Yoon debuted as a solo artist in 2001, under the moniker "T" which she shortened even more from "Tasha". She released her first album, As Time Goes By that same year. Her second album, Gemini and her third album, To My Love, were released the following year in 2002. In 2006, she joined Jungle Entertainment, a label founded by her now-husband Tiger JK. The following year, she released the album T3 – Yoon Mi Rae, on which she shared the difficulties she faced as a mixed-race musician in Korea. That year, she performed in Seoul, South Korea with American singer Amerie, who is also of African and Korean heritage. In 2012, Yoon became the face of the computer brand Hewlett-Packard in Korea, having signed a one-year contract to appear in their print media and radio advertisements. She was also a judge on the third and fourth seasons of the television talent competition Superstar K.

Yoon, Tiger JK and rapper Bizzy, formed the hip hop trio MFBTY (My Fans Better Than Yours) in 2013. The group's first single, "Sweet Dream," ranked #1 on three Korean music charts shortly after its release. They had debuted the song at a concert in Cannes, France. MFBTY signed to Tiger JK's newly created Feel Ghood Music label later that year. In September 2013, Yoon earned the #1 spot on Billboard's Korea K-Pop Hot 100 list with her song "Touch Love" from the South Korean drama Master's Sun. In December 2014, Yoon released the single "Angel," which quickly became #1 on four Korean music charts. Also that month she revealed that the American film The Interview used her song "Pay Day" without permission, and that she was taking legal action.

== Personal life ==
In June 2007, she married Tiger JK in a private ceremony in a Buddhist Temple. The wedding occurred a month before the death of Tiger JK's grandmother who had wanted to see them wed before her death. Yoon gave birth to their son Jordan Seo in March 2008.

Yoon and her husband are advocates against child abuse. In 2011, they appeared in a photoshoot with their son in Vogue Korea for the "Stop Child Abuse & Love Children" campaign. They also filmed a public service announcement for the World Day for the Prevention of Child Abuse, performing at the 2011 Child Abuse Awareness Concert. In 2012, South Korea's Ministry of Health and Welfare commended the couple for their efforts in promoting child abuse prevention. Yoon has also promoted awareness of multiculturalism within Korean families. In 2008, she volunteered for seven months at a multicultural youth camp.

== Discography ==
=== Studio albums ===
Title	Album details	Peak chart positions	Sales
Title	Album details	KOR	Sales
As Times Goes By	Released: September 10, 2001; Label: World Music Entertainment; Formats: CD, cassette; Track listing: 1. "바보"; 2. "시간이 흐른 뒤" (As Time Goes By); 3. "I Miss You So"; 4. "슬픔에 기대어"; 5. "행복한 나를"; 6. "그대없는 사랑"; 7. "La Musique"; 8. "As Time Goes By" (English version); 9. "She" (...Could Never Be Me); 10. "삶의 향기" (Soul Flower); 11. "Old School Love"; 12. "친구가 아닌 연인"; 13. "La Musique" (English version); 14. "시간이 흐른 뒤" (As Time Goes By) (Remix); 15. "하루하루"	7	KOR: 256,890
Gemini	Released: May 3, 2002; Label: World Music Entertainment; Formats: CD, cassette; Track listing: 1. "G火자"; 2. "Meditation"; 3. "Me We"; 4. "Memories..." (Smiling Tears); 5. "Wonder Woman"; 6. "끝없는 바다 저편에"; 7. "Concrete Jungle"; 8. "Combination Platter"; 9. "Double Trouble"; 10. "남자 남자 남자"; 11. "Memories..." (Smiling Tears) (English version); 12. "MT" (혁명)	15	KOR: 90,019
To My Love	Released: December 5, 2002; Label: World Music Entertainment; Formats: CD, cassette; Track listing: 1. "Unforgettable"; 2. "To My Love" (Korean Ver.); 3. "Tuesday"; 4. "선물"; 5. "To My Love" (English version); 6. "끝없는 바다 저편에" (with Bobby Kim); 7. "One Day"; 8. "Because I Love You" (with Bobby Kim); 9. "집으로 와"; 10. "나는"; 11. "인연"; 12. "Why Me?"; 13. "Gotta Get Love"; 14. "찬바람아!"; 15. "Because I Love You" (English version); 16. "너" (Sad But True)	7	KOR: 71,046
t 3 Yoonmirae	Released: February 23, 2007; Label: Jungle Entertainment; Format: CD, digital download; Track listing: 1. "Black Diamond"; 2. "What's Up, Mr. Good Stuff"; 3. "잊었니"; 4. "Honeymoon"; 5. "Gimme, Gimme!!!" (이기주의자); 6. "Pay Day"; 7. "시간은 눈물과 흐르고"; 8. "나니까"; 9. "Black Happiness" (검은 행복); 10. "Who"; 11. "Good Bye Sadness, Hello Happiness"	—	—N/a
Gemini 2	Released: July 5, 2018; Label: Feel Ghood Music; Format: CD, digital download; Track listing: 1. "Rap Queen"; 2. "개같애" (feat. Tiger JK); 3. "Cookie"; 4. "You & Me" (feat. Junoflo); 5. "가위바위보"; 6. "샴페인" (Champagne) (feat. Junoflo); 7. "Peach"; 8. "No Gravity" (Piano Ver.); 9. "오늘처럼" (feat. Double K, WHO$); 10. "You & Me" (Eng Ver.) (feat. Junoflo); 11. "Peach" (Eng Ver.); 12. "잠깐만" Baby (Remix)	26	KOR: 1,877
"—" denotes album did not chart.

=== Collaborative albums ===
Title	Album details	Peak chart positions	Sales
Title	Album details	KOR	Sales
살자 (The Cure) (with Drunken Tiger & Bizzy)	Released: September 13, 2013; Label: Feel Ghood Music; Format: CD, digital download; Track listing: 1. "Beautiful Life"; 2. "첫눈이 오면 설레였던 꼬마아이" (Time Travel); 3. "살자" (The Cure); 4. "Sweet Dream"; 5. "BizzyTigerYoonmirae"; 6. "뭉쳐" (All In Together); 7. "Go"; 8. "Get It In" (feat. Jung In); 9. "살자" (The Cure) (Reggae Ver.)	11	KOR: 6,811

=== Compilation albums ===
Title	Album details
T Best Album	Released: April 25, 2003; Label: Avex Trax; Format: CD, digital download; Track listing: 1. "To My Love"; 2. "바보"; 3. "시간이 흐른 뒤" (As Time Goes By); 4. "선물"; 5. "끝없는 바다 저편에"; 6. "남자 남자 남자"; 7. "Tuesday"; 8. "Concrete Jungle"; 9. "행복한 나를"; 10. "집으로 와"; 11. "I Miss You So"; 12. "지화자"; 13. "Wonder Woman"; 14. "Because I Love You"; 15. "찬 바람아"; 16. "하루 하루"

=== Singles ===
Title	Year	Peak chart positions	Sales	Album
Title	Year	KOR (Note: The Gaon Music Chart was established in 2010.)	Sales	Album
As lead artist
"As Time Goes By" (시간이 흐른 뒤)	2001	—		As Time Goes By
"Boundless Ocean" (끝없는 바다 저편에...)	2002	—		Gemini
"To My Love" (Korean ver.)	2002	—		To My Love
"Incomplete" (잊었니...)	2007	—		t 3 Yoonmirae
"Please Don't Leave" (떠나지마)	2009	—		Non-album singles
"Get It In" (feat. Tiger JK, Jung-in)	2011	5	KOR: 1,794,085	Non-album singles
"This Love" (사랑이 맞을거야)	2015	1	KOR: 650,120	Non-album singles
"Because of You"	2016	19	KOR: 184,125	SM Station Season 1
"Jam Come On Baby" (잠깐만 Baby)	2016	36	KOR: 43,306	Non-album singles
"No Gravity"	2018	—		Non-album singles
"Kawi Bawi Bo" (가위바위보)	2018	—		Gemini 2
"You and Me" (feat. Junoflo)	2018	—		Gemini 2
"Don't Forget Me" (잊어가지마)	2019	45		Non-album single
Collaborations
"Wonderful" (with Johan Kim)	2007	—		Non-album single
"The Cure" (살자) (with Tiger JK and Bizzy)	2013	3	KOR: 484,671	The Cure
"Angel" (with Tiger JK and Bizzy)	2014	2	KOR: 707,891	WondaLand
"#Capture the City" (with Boys Noize)	2015	—		Non-album singles
"You and I" (너와 나) (with Jeon In-kwon, Zion.T, Tiger JK, Galaxy Express and others)	2015	—		Non-album singles
"How Are You?" (잘 지내고 있니) (with Punch)	2016	16	KOR: 176,786	Non-album singles
"Ghood Family" (with Tiger JK, feat. Bizzy, Black Nine, BB, MRSHLL)	2017	—		Non-album singles
"Draw Your Love" (with Tiger JK and Bizzy)	2019	—		Non-album singles
As featured artist
"Positive Vibes" (Paloalto feat. Yoon Mi-rae)	2010	77		Lonely Hearts
"Freaky Deaky Superstar" (두두루 와바루) (Korean ver.) (Drunken Tiger feat. Yoon-Mi-rae and Bizzy)	2011	20	KOR: 348,208	Non-album single
"Turned Off the TV" (TV를 껐네) (Leessang feat. Yoon Mi-rae and 10cm)	2011	1	KOR: 3,081,880	Asura Balbalta
"Without You Now" (이젠 너 없이도) (Euna Kim feat. Yoon Mi-rae, Tiger JK, Bizzy)	2014	9	KOR: 350,017	Non-album singles
"Beautiful" (Yoonhan feat. Yoon Mi-rae)	2015	—		Non-album singles
"Forever" (반가워요) (Tiger JK feat. Yoon Mi-rae)	2015	71	KOR: 26,230	Non-album singles
"Home" (Ailee feat. Yoon Mi-rae)	2016	20	KOR: 156,625	A New Empire
"Ghood Life" (MyunDo feat. Yoon Mi-rae and Bizzy)	2017	—		RGB pt.(0,255,0)
"Clover" (Jin Longguo feat. Yoon Mi-rae)	2018	—		Non-album single
"Silent Movie" (무성영화) (Yubin feat. Yoon Mi-rae)	2019	—		Start of the End
"Linda" (Linda G (Lee Hyori) feat. Yoon Mi-rae)	2020	4		Durijyuwa X Linda X Let's Dance
"Red Lipstick" (빨간립스틱) (Lee Hi feat. Yoon Mi-rae)	2021	30		4 Only
"Self Love" ( F.Hero feat. Tiger JK, Yoon Mi-rae, Billkin)	2022	—		Self Love
"—" denotes releases that did not chart or were not released in that region.

=== Soundtrack appearances ===
Title	Year	Peak chart positions	Sales	Album
Title	Year	KOR	Sales	Album
"Touch Love"	2013	1	KOR: 1,299,537	Master's Sun OST Part 4
"I Love You" (너를 사랑해)	2014	1	KOR: 1,236,319	It's Okay, That's Love OST Part 6
"I'll Listen To What You Have To Say" (너의 얘길 들어줄게)	2015	7	KOR: 402,464	Who Are You: School 2015 OST Part 3
"Always"	2016	2	KOR: 1,454,125	Descendants of the Sun OST Part 1
"You Are My World" (그대라는 세상)	2016	10	KOR: 259,876	The Legend of the Blue Sea OST Part 2
"Goodbye" (with Ann)	2017	—		Queen of Mystery OST Part 4
"The Sky of My Youth" (젊은 날의 Sky)	2017	—		Hit the Top OST Part 3
"You, You, You" (그대 그대 그대)	2018	—		The Ghost Detective OST Part 5
"My Dream"	2019	—		Rookie Historian Goo Hae-ryung OST Part 2
"Flower"	2019	22		Crash Landing on You OST Part 2
"Say"	2020	63		Itaewon Class OST Part 8
"Lost"	2020	—		Stranger Season 2 OST Part 5
"It's My Life"	2021	94		Hospital Playlist Season 2 OST Part 10
"Law" (with Bibi)	2022	14		Street Man Fighter OST Part 3
"—" denotes releases that did not chart or were not released in that region.

== Filmography ==
=== Television appearances ===
- 2018: The Fan – Fan (Episode 1)
- 2016: Fantastic Duo – Contestant (Episode 17-20)
- 2011: Superstar K3 – Judge
- 2010: Running Man, Classics – Episode 59

== Accolades ==
=== Awards and nominations ===
Name of the award ceremony, year presented, category, nominee(s) of the award, and the result of the nomination
Award ceremony	Year	Category	Nominee(s) / Work(s)	Result	Ref.
Korean Music Awards	2008	Best R&B & Soul Album	Yoonmirae	Won	
Korean Music Awards	2008	Best R&B & Soul Song	"What's Up! Mr. Good Stuff"	Won	
MAMA Awards	2007	Best R&B Performance	"Have You Forgotten?"	Won	
MAMA Awards	2013	Best OST	"Touch Love"	Won	
MAMA Awards	2014	Best OST	"I Love You"	Nominated	
Melon Music Awards	2013	Best OST	"Touch Love"	Won	
Mnet 20's Choice Awards	2010	20 Most Influential Stars	Yoon Mi-rae	Won	
SBS Gayo Daejeon	2002	R&B Category Award	Yoon Mi-rae	Won	
Style Icon Awards	2012	People's Choice Award	Yoon Mi-rae	Won	

=== Listicles ===
Name of publisher, year listed, name of listicle, and placement
Publisher	Year	Listicle	Placement	Ref.
Mnet	2013	Legend 100 Artists	77th	
