= Choi Jung-in =

South Korean singer

- 최정인
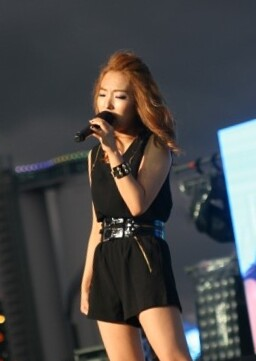
- Choi Jung-in at Yeosu Exposition: Big Wave Concert 2, in 2014
- Born: December 7, 1980 (age 45); South Korea
- Occupation: Singer
- Years active: 2002–present
- Spouse: Jo Jung-chi (m. 2013)
- Children: 2
- Musical career
- Genre: K-pop
- Label: Mystic
- Formerly of: G.Fla
- Website: www.jung-in.kr

Korean name
- Hangul: 최정인
- RR: Choe Jeongin
- MR: Ch'oe Chŏngin

Choi Jung-in (Korean: 최정인; born December 7, 1980), also known mononymously as Jung-in, is a South Korean singer. She debuted in 2002 as a guest vocalist on the song "Rush" by hip hop duo Leessang, frequently collaborating with the group over the next decade. She was a member of the R&B group G.Fla from 2004 to 2008, before releasing her debut solo album, From Andromeda, in 2010. She reunited with Leessang member Gary in 2014 for the single "Your Scent", which reached number one on the Gaon Digital Chart.

== Career ==
=== 2002–2007: Debut and G.Fla ===
She debuted in a collaboration with Leessang for the song "Rush". She would later join the five-member R&B group, G.Fla, consisting of herself, Geol, Jung Soo-young, Jung Hee-young and Kim Ji-in. In 2004, G.Fla released their first album Groove Flamingo on September 16. Their last album together, 음악하는 여자, was released on September 5, 2007.

On April 1 and 3, 2018, she participated in the Spring is Coming concert, a pro-peace event held in North Korea.

== Personal life ==
Choi is married to singer Jo Jung-chi. Their first child, a daughter, was born in February 2017. They briefly joined the cast of The Return of Superman in May 2018. The couple's second child, a son, was born on December 13, 2019.

== Discography ==
=== Extended plays ===
Title	Album details	Peak chart positions	Sales
Title	Album details	KOR	Sales
From Andromeda	Released: March 11, 2010; Label: Mystic89; Formats: CD, digital download	6	
Melody Remedy	Released: April 5, 2011; Label: Mystic89; Formats: CD, digital download	8	KOR: 1,945
Geuni (그니)	Released: March 12, 2013; Label: Mystic89; Formats: CD, digital download	15	KOR: 1,054
Autumn Lady (가을여자)	Released: October 17, 2013; Label: Mystic89; Formats: CD, digital download	28	KOR: 626
Rare	Released: January 26, 2016; Label: Mystic89; Formats: CD, digital download	25	KOR: 550
Jung-in & Mild Beats (with Mild Beats)	Released: August 22, 2024; Label: Whitebear; Formats: Digital download	—	
1980 Tuesday (1980 화요일) (with Ra.D)	Released: February 25, 2025; Label: Whitebear, Realcollabo; Formats: Digital download	—	

=== Singles ===
Title	Year	Peak chart positions	Album
Title	Year	KOR	Album
As lead artist
"I Hate You" (미워요)	2010	9	From Andromeda
"Rainy Season" (장마)	2011	26	Melody Remedy
"345 pm"	2012	—	Non-album single
"Those Obvious Words" (그 뻔한 말)	2013	13	Geuni
"Autumn Man" (가을남자)	2013	30	Autumn Lady
"UUU"	2016	31	Rare
"Difference" (달라요)	2018	—	Non-album singles
"Deep Love" (사랑 그 깊은 곳)	2019	181	Non-album singles
"Unspeakable" (어떻게 해야 할까요)	2021	—	Non-album singles
"Hardcore Life" (하드코어 인생아)	2021	—	Non-album singles
Collaborations
"Dawn" (새벽길) with No Young-shim, Jeong Jae-il	2010	—	Non-album single
"Can You Hear Me?" (들리나요) with Park Shin-yang	2010	—	Road For Hope
"The Dream of Be a Green Star" (초록별의 노래) with Lee Hyun-woo, Danny Ahn	2011	—	Non-album single
"Uphill Road" (오르막길) with Yoon Jong-shin	2012	41	His Walk of Life 2012
"Your Scent" (사람냄새) with Gary	2014	1	Non-album singles
"Bicycle" (자전거) with Gary	2014	6	Non-album singles
"Town Bar" (동네술집) with Huh Gak	2015	5	Non-album singles
"The Coldness" (추위) with Yoon Jong-shin	2017	84	His Walk of Life 2017
"Love Me" (날 사랑해요) with Yezi	2018	—	Non-album singles
"Attention" with Eden	2018	—	Non-album singles
"Every Day By Your Side" (그대 곁에 매일) with Xbf feat.Gaeko	2020	—	Non-album singles
As featured artist
"Rush" by Leessang feat. Jung-in	2002	No data	Leessang Of Honey Family
"Fly High" by Leessang feat. Jung-in, Hareem	2003	No data	Jae, Gyebal
"Leessang Blues" by Leessang feat. Jung-in	2003	No data	Jae, Gyebal
"Go Back" by Dynamic Duo feat. Jung-in	2005	No data	Double Dynamite
"Champion" by Leessang feat. Jung-in	2009	No data	Baekajeolhyeon
"Drivin" by Steady-B feat. Jung-in, b-soap, The Quiett	2009	No data	Take My Ride
"Goodbye" (잘 지내) by Giant Pink feat. Jung-in	2018	—	Non-album single
"—" denotes release did not chart.

=== Soundtrack appearances ===
Title	Year	Peak chart positions	Album
Title	Year	KOR	Album
"What To Do?" (어떡해)	2012	49	12 Signs of Love OST
"As Life Goes On" (살다가보면)	2014	26	High School King of Savvy OST
"Actually I" (사실은 내가)	2015	36	Yong-pal OST
"Believe In A Miracle" (기적을 믿나요)	2017	—	Avengers Social Club OST
"Coincidence" (우연처럼)	2018	—	Should We Kiss First? OST
"Comfort" (위로)	2018	—	Your Honor OST
"Love Poem" (순애보)	2019	—	Haechi OST
"The End"	2019	—	Confession OST
"Twinkle" (반짝)	2020	—	Sweet Munchies OST
"Thank you and sorry" (너라서 고마웠고 나여서 미안했다고)	2020	—	Zombie Detective OST
"Love Song" (연가)	2021	—	Bossam: Steal the Fate OST
"Find The Way"	2021	—	The Road: The Tragedy of One OST
"What If"	2022	—	Green Mothers' Club OST
"—" denotes release did not chart.

=== Compilation appearances ===
Title	Year	Peak chart positions	Album
Title	Year	KOR	Album
"Our night is more beautiful than your day" (우리의 밤은 당신의 낮보다 아름답다)	2012	—	'I'm a Singer 2' Group B Contest on May 13th - Recommended songs for netizens
"While Living Live" (사노라면)	2012	—	'I am a singer 2' May 20 - Farewell Singer Exhibition
"Sparks (original singer Youngrok Jeon)" (불티 (원곡가수 전영록))	2012	—	'I'm a Singer 2' Group B contest on June 10
"To me (original song singer Jang Hye-jin)" (내게로 (원곡가수 장혜진))	2012	—	'I am a singer 2' June 17 - Farewell Singer Exhibition
"Calling You (Jevetta Steele)"	2012	—	'I'm a Singer 2' Group A contest in July
"The shade of parting (original song singer Yoon Sang)" (이별의 그늘 (원곡가수 윤상))	2012	—	'I am a singer 2' July Farewell Singer
"I Loved a Friend's Friend" (친구의 친구를 사랑했네)	2013	—	Immortal Songs: Singing the Legend (Lee Seung-chul Part 2)
"Let's Dance the Cha Cha Cha" (다함께 차차차)	2013	—	Immortal Songs: Singing the Legend (Seol Woon-do Part 2)
"Truth about Love" (사랑의 진실)	2013	—	Immortal Songs: Singing the Legend (Onions)
"Sorrowful Serenade" (애수의 소야곡)	2014	—	Immortal Songs: Singing the Legend (Park Si-chun)
"Uphill Road" (오르막길) with Sweet Sorrow	2015	—	I'm a Singer Season 3 Episode 6 'Duet Mission'
"The Passing of Time" (가는 세월)	2015	—	Immortal Songs: Singing the Legend (Seo Yoo-seok)
"Mine" (나만의 것) feat. Miwoo	2015	—	Immortal Songs: Singing the Legend (Lyricist Kim Sung-on)
"Even If A Memorable Day Comes" (기억날 그 날이 와도)	2016	—	Immortal Songs: Singing the Legend (Oh Tae-ho)
"Ah-Choo" (아츄)	2016	—	Vocal War: God's Voice Part 3
"Western Sky" (사쪽 하늘) feat. Lee Seung-chul	2016	—	Immortal Songs: Singing the Legend (Legendary harmony with Lee Seung-chul)
"Passionate Goodbye" (뜨거운 안녕)	2016	—	Vocal War: God's Voice Part 11
"No.1"	2016	—	Vocal War: God's Voice Part 13
"You Are Tearful" (그대는 눈물겹다) with Choi Hyo-in	2016	—	Duet Song Festival 15th
"Call My Name" with Gummy & Ailee	2017	—	The Call Project 4
"Remember" among The Call artists	2017	—	The Call Final Project
"Hot Friend" with Gummy	2017	—	The Call Final Project
"—" denotes release did not chart.

== Awards and nominations ==
Award ceremony	Year	Category	Nominee(s)	Result	Ref.
Cyworld Digital Music Awards	2009	Collaboration Award	"Girl Who Can't Break Up, Guy Who Can't Leave" (Leessang feat. Jung-in)	Won	
Korean Music Awards	2025	Best R&B & Soul Song	"Blame" (with Mild Beats)	Won	
Korean Music Awards	2025	Best R&B & Soul Album	Jung In & Mild Beats (with Mild Beats)	Nominated	
Mnet Asian Music Awards	2010	Best Vocal Performance (Solo)	"I Hate You"	Nominated	
Mnet Asian Music Awards	2014	Best Collaboration	"Your Scent" (with Gary)	Nominated	
