= Gary (rapper) =

South Korean entertainer (born 1978)

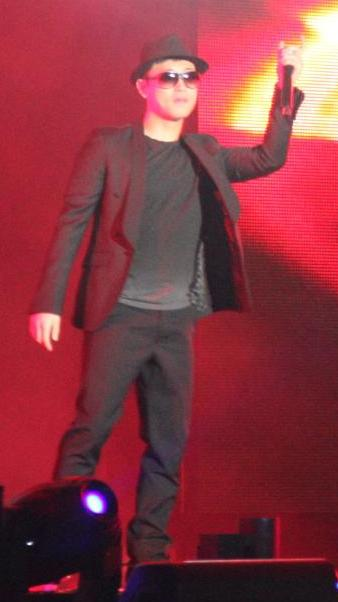
- Born: February 24, 1978 (age 48); South Korea
- Education: Yong In University
- Occupations: Rapper; songwriter; entrepreneur; record producer; television personality
- Spouse: Kim Se-eun (m. 2017)
- Children: 1 (Kang Ha-oh)
- Musical career
- Genre: Hip hop
- Instrument: Vocals
- Years active: 1996–2022
- Labels: Leessang Company; Yangbans Nation; Double 8; Million Market

Korean name
- Hangul: 강희건
- Hanja: 姜熙建
- RR: Gang Huigeon
- MR: Kang Hŭigŏn

Kang Hee-gun (Korean: 강희건; born February 24, 1978), better known by his stage name Gary (개리, often spelled as Garie), is a South Korean rapper, songwriter, record producer, entrepreneur, and television personality. Besides being a solo artist, he is also the rapper and lyricist of the former hip hop duo Leessang. Since their formation in 2002, the group has produced a total of eight albums and had several hits under their belt. In 2014, Gary made his debut as a solo artist with the mini-album Mr.Gae. Despite the album being banned by all major TV broadcast stations for its 19+ content, his songs still managed to top several charts. He and long time collaborator Jung-in later went on to form the duo, Jung In & Gary. The two released the singles "Your Scent" and "Bicycle."

Aside from his own work, Gary has been featured in works by famous artists such as Psy, Baek Ji-young, Lee Hyori, Dynamic Duo, and MC Mong. He is also a former cast member of the variety show Running Man.

== Early life ==
Gary was born on February 24, 1978. His nickname in middle school was "Gae" (meaning "dog" in Korean), which he adapted to become his stage name, after deciding between "gaemi" (ant) and "Gary". In his younger years, he was more interested in dancing than rapping. Gary revealed that he participated in a dance competition and actually won, defeating other competitors, Jang Woo Hyuk and Moon Hee Jun, who eventually became members of H.O.T. Lee Soo Man scouted all three boys, and offered them a contract to SM Entertainment. Ultimately, Gary rejected the offer. Gary went to Yong In University and trained as a bodyguard. He was an amateur boxer for 10 years.

== Musical and film career ==
=== 1997–2001: X-Teen and Honey Family ===
In 1997, Gary joined X-Teen, a hip-hop group where he met his future Leessang partner, Gil. Gary participated in the group's album release in 1998 before being dropped along with Gil. In an interview, Gary said they had neither the look or the talent which made them quit the group.

Afterwards, Gary and Gil ended up joining "Honey Family" and released two albums in 1999 and 2000. Gary took part of the responsibility for the break up of the group by stating that he "started feeling like a celebrity" after their initial success. Gary, Gil, and fellow Honey Family member Diggity decided to form "Leessam Trio" ("sam" means "three" in Korean). They released a compilation album called 2000 Korea, in the year 2000. When Diggity left the group, Gary and Gil changed the name to LeeSsang.

=== 2002–2017: Leessang ===
Leessang was created in 2002 by Gary and Gil. So far, the group has produced eight albums with numerous hits. Although the duo achieve critical success from their earlier albums, they remained underground. Their last three albums, Hexagonal, Asura Balbalta, and Unplugged broke numerous records and guided their entry to the mainstream Korean music industry. The title song from Asura Balbalta, "Turn Off the TV" managed to stay at the top of the Melon chart for 25 days in a row.

=== 2010–2017: Running Man ===
In 2010, Gary joined Running Man, an urban variety show, as a co-host, along with 6 other original cast members, including Yoo Jae-suk, Haha, Ji Suk-jin, Kim Jong-kook, Lee Kwang-soo and Song Joong-ki while the only female member, Song Ji-hyo, joined the cast a few episodes afterward. The popularity of Running Man helped Gary and the rest of the cast gain international recognition.

In October 2016, the producers of Running Man announced the departure of Gary, who wanted to focus on his music career after being a regular member for a little over six years. His last filming with the main cast was for episode 324. However, he made a brief return in the following episode 325 as a guest.

In January 2017, Gary appeared for Member's Week on episode 336.

=== 2014–present: Solo career ===
In January 2014, he released a mini album, Mr.Gae. Three major TV broadcast stations, MBC, KBS, and SBS, all deemed the album unfitting for broadcast, stating reasons such as explicit lyrics and being too sexually provocative. Despite the ban, Gary's title track "Shower Later" clenched the number 1 spot on 8 real-time music charts.

Gary later commented on the ban saying that he felt confined by his image and wanted to break the mold.

In May 2014, Gary and Jung-in released their first collaboration "Your Scent." The lyrics was penned by Gary while Jung-In and Duble Sidekick produced the music. Despite not having any live promotions, Gary and Jung-In took the win on June 7 Music Core. In a testament to its popularity, the Gaon Chart ranked the single #6 on the year end national digital single ranking. The two later released their second collaboration "Bicycle" in September 2014.

In September 2015, Gary released his second solo album, 2002. The title track of the album is "Get Some Air" featuring Mi-woo of Leessang Company. Several other tracks in this album also featured Koonta, Deepflow, Skull, Jay Park, DJ Pumkin, Park Myung-ho Double K, Don Mills, Jung-in, John Park and Young-jun of Brown Eyed Souls.

In January 2016, Gary released a single, "Lonely Night" featuring Gaeko of Dynamic Duo. A music video was released on the same day, featuring actress and fellow castmate of Running Man, Song Ji-hyo. Gary was nominated as a no.1 candidate on SBS Inkigayo on January 10, 2016, and subsequently won the award.

On January 6, 2020, KBS announced that Gary would be joining the cast of The Return of Superman after a three-year broadcasting hiatus. Gary and his family appeared on the show until their departure in December.

In March 2020, Million Market revealed that they had signed a non-exclusive contract with Gary through his agency Double 8. Contract negotiations were concluded when Gary joined as a cast member of The Return of Superman.

== Personal life ==
On April 5, 2017, Gary revealed on his social media account that he had married a non-celebrity woman known as "Miss Kim" who worked at Gary's company named Leessang for 5 years before their marriage. Their first child, a son named Kang Ha-oh was born on October 15, 2017.

== Filmography ==
=== Film ===
| Year | Title | Role |
|---|---|---|
| 2008 | Dachimawa Lee | Cameo |
| 2014 | Wonderful Radio | Cameo |

=== Television series ===
| Year | Title | Role |
|---|---|---|
| 2014 | Emergency Couple | Cameo |
| 2015 | A Girl Who Sees Smells | Cameo with Running Man members |

=== Variety shows ===
| Year | Title | Notes/Ref. |
|---|---|---|
| 2010–2016, 2017 | Running Man | Cast member (ep. 1–324); Guest (ep. 325, 336) |
| 2017 | Kang Ceremony | Chinese reality show |
| 2020 | The Return of Superman | Cast member with his son, Kang Ha-oh (ep. 315–362) |
| 2020 | Law of the Jungle in Zero Point | Cast member with Kim Byung-man, Heo Kyung-hwan, Ki Do-hoon, Lee Seung-yoon, Pak Se-ri, Yoon Eun-hye |
| 2021 | Law of the Jungle in Ulleungdo & Dokdo | Cast member with Kim Byung-man, Chanyeol, Go Joon-hee, Julien Kang, Park Mi-sun |
| 2022 | Artistock Game | User agent |

== Discography ==
=== Studio albums ===
| Title | Album details | Peak chart positions | Sales |
| Title | Album details | KOR | Sales |
|---|---|---|---|
| 2002 | Released: September 21, 2015; Label: Leessang Company; Formats: CD, digital download | 3 | KOR: 6,819 |

=== Extended plays ===
| Title | Album details | Peak chart positions | Sales |
| Title | Album details | KOR | Sales |
|---|---|---|---|
| Mr. Gae | Released: January 15, 2014; Label: Leessang Company; Formats: CD, digital download | 4 | KOR: 12,320 |
| 2020 | Released: October 15, 2020; Label: Double Eight; Formats: CD, digital download | — | |
"—" denotes releases that did not chart or were not released in that region.

=== Singles ===
| Title | Year | Peak chart positions | Album |
| Title | Year | KOR | Album |
As lead artist
| "Shower Later" (조금 이따 샤워해) feat. Crush | 2014 | 1 | Mr. Gae |
| "Zotto Mola" (XX몰라) | 2014 | 5 | Mr. Gae |
| "Get Some Air" (바람이나 좀 쐐) feat. Miwoo | 2015 | 1 | 2002 |
| "JOA" (엉덩이) feat. Jay Park | 2015 | 8 | 2002 |
| "Lonely Night" (또 하루) feat. Gaeko | 2015 | 1 | Non-album singles |
| "Worry" (고민) | 2017 | 61 | Non-album singles |
| "Sun" (태양) feat. Chancellor | 2018 | 64 | Non-album singles |
| "Purple Bikini" | 2019 | — | Non-album singles |
Collaborations
| "Where Do You Wanna Go" (어디 갈래) with Crush, Taewan | 2013 | 20 | Non-album singles |
| "Your Scent" (사람냄새) with Jung-in | 2014 | 1 | Non-album singles |
| "Bicycle" (자전거) with Jung-in | 2014 | 6 | Non-album singles |
"—" denotes releases that did not chart or were not released in that region.

=== Soundtrack appearances ===
| Title | Year | Peak chart positions | Album |
| Title | Year | KOR | Album |
|---|---|---|---|
| "Tantara" (딴따라) feat. Miwoo | 2016 | 58 | Entertainer OST |

=== Featuring ===
| Year | Artist | Song |
|---|---|---|
| 2002 | Brown Eyes | "I Wanna Fall in Love With You" |
| 2004 | Kim Bum-soo | "About Eternity" |
| 2005 | BMK | "Rainbow" |
| 2005 | Dynamic Duo | "It's Alright" |
| 2005 | Eun Jiwon | "Gotta Go" |
| 2006 | Jang Hye-jin | "Firework" |
| 2009 | Fly to the Sky | "Hide and Seek" |
| 2010 | Lee Hyori | "Swing" |
| 2010 | Kim Jong-kook | "Come Back to Me" |
| 2010 | Dynamic Duo | "Keep the Change" |
| 2011 | Primary | "Happy Ending" |
| 2012 | Miryo | "Party Rock" |
| 2012 | Baek Ji-young | "Voice" |
| 2012 | C-Luv, Crush | "Where Do You Wanna Go?" |
| 2012 | Kim Jong-kook, Haha | "Words I Want to Say to You" |
| 2012 | Haha, Taw | "Love" |
| 2013 | Choi Jung-in | "Let's Walk a Little" |
| 2014 | MC Mong | "Broken Fan" |
| 2015 | Youngjun | "Thinking of You" |
| 2016 | Park Myung-ho | "Bed Room" |
| 2016 | San E | "Like An Airplane" |
| 2021 | Heize | "Like the First Time" |
| 2021 | Trade L | "Direction" |

== Awards and nominations ==
| Year | Award | Category | Nominated work | Result |
|---|---|---|---|---|
| 2002 | Mnet Music Video Festival | Hip-Hop Artist of the Year | Leessang | Won |
| 2003 | Mnet Music Video Festival | Hip-Hop Artist of the Year | Leessang | Nominated |
| 2005 | Korean Music Awards | Hip-Hop Song of the Year | Leessang | Nominated |
| 2007 | Mnet/KM Music Awards | Hip-Hop Song of the Year | Leessang | Nominated |
| 2007 | Mnet/KM Music Awards | Music Video of the Year | Leessang | Nominated |
| 2007 | Mnet/KM Music Awards | Song of the Year | Leessang | Nominated |
| 2007 | Cyworld Digital Music Awards | Song of the Month | Leessang | Won |
| 2009 | Cyworld Digital Music Awards | Best Collaboration of the Year | Leessang | Won |
| 2009 | MIAK Golden Disc Awards | Hip-Hop Artist of the Year | Leessang | Nominated |
| 2009 | MIAK Golden Disc Awards | Album of the Year | Leessang | Nominated |
| 2009 | Mnet Asian Music Awards | Music Video of the Year | Leessang | Nominated |
| 2009 | Mnet Asian Music Awards | Hip-Hop Artist of the Year | Leessang | Won |
| 2010 | 4th SBS Entertainment Award | New Star Award | Running Man | Won |
| 2010 | Cyworld Digital Music Awards | Bonsang | Leessang | Won |
| 2010 | Cyworld Digital Music Awards | Best Collaboration of the Year | Leessang | Won |
| 2011 | MelOn Music Awards | Top 10 Artists | Leessang | Won |
| 2011 | Mnet Asian Music Awards | Best Rap Performance | Leessang | Won |
| 2011 | 4th SBS Entertainment Award | Netizen Popularity Award | Running Man | Nominated |
| 2012 | 5th SBS Entertainment Award | Excellence Award in Variety | Running Man | Won |
| 2013 | NATE Awards | Best Couple with Song Ji-hyo | Running Man | Won |
| 2013 | 7th SBS Entertainment Awards | Best Couple Award with Song Ji-hyo | Running Man | Nominated |
| 2013 | 7th SBS Entertainment Awards | Viewer's Most Popular Award (with Running Man members) | Running Man | Won |
| 2013 | Melon Music Awards | Rap/Hip-Hop Award | Leessang – "Tears" (Korean: 눈물) | Nominated |
| 2013 | MelOn Music Awards | Song of the Year | Leessang – "Tears" (Korean: 눈물) | Nominated |
| 2014 | Mnet Asian Music Awards | Best Rap Performance | "Shower Later" | Nominated |
| 2014 | Mnet Asian Music Awards | Best Collaboration with Jung-in | "Your Scent" | Nominated |
| 2014 | Singapore Entertainment Awards | OMY Hot Star with Song Ji-hyo | | Nominated |
| 2014 | 2nd Annual DramaFever Awards | Best Kiss with Song Ji-hyo | Running Man | Won |
| 2014 | 2nd Annual DramaFever Awards | Best Couple Not Meant To Be with Song Ji-hyo | Running Man | Nominated |
| 2015 | 2014 Youku Night Awards | Entertainment Spirit Award | Running Man | Won |
| 2015 | Mnet Asian Music Awards | Best Rap Performance | "Get Some Air" (Korean: 바람이나 좀 쐐) | Nominated |
| 2015 | Mnet Asian Music Awards | UnionPay Song of the Year | "Get Some Air" (Korean: 바람이나 좀 쐐) | Nominated |
| 2015 | 9th SBS Entertainment Awards | Top Excellence Award in Variety with Song Ji-hyo | Running Man | Won |
| 2016 | Mnet Asian Music Awards | Best Rap Performance | "Lonely Night" | Nominated |
| 2016 | Mnet Asian Music Awards | UnionPay Song of the Year | "Lonely Night" | Nominated |
