= Hoho =

Hoho may refer to:

- Ho Hos, a brand of snack cakes
- Hoho, Finland, a village
- Hoho, a monkey on the television show Ni Hao, Kai-Lan

== See also ==
- Ho (disambiguation)
- Ho ho ho (disambiguation)
- Hoohoo (disambiguation)
