= 2002 (Gary album) =

2015 album by Gary

Studio album by Gary
- Released: September 21, 2015
- Genre: Hip hop
- Labels: Leessang Company, Loen Entertainment

Gary chronology
Mr. Gae (2014)	2002 (2015)

2002 is the first studio album by South Korean rapper Gary. The album was released on September 21, 2015, by Leessang Company and Loen Entertainment.

== Track listing ==
No.	Title	Length
1.	"2002 Spring" (featuring Koonta)	3:41
2.	"Doong Doong" (featuring Skull, Deepflow)	3:27
3.	"JOA" (featuring Jay Park)	3:49
4.	"Rap" (featuring DJ Pumkin)	3:55
5.	"Get Some Air" (featuring Miwoo)	3:43
6.	"Mushi Mushi" (featuring Park Myung-ho, Double K, Don Mills)	3:37
7.	"Halyang Dream" (featuring John Park)	4:26
8.	"Shipapa" (featuring Jung-in, Miwoo)	3:28
9.	"Alcohol Feeling" (featuring Jung-in)	3:58
10.	"Empty" (featuring Young-jun of Brown Eyed Soul)	3:47
