= Ha Ha Ha =

Ha ha ha is an onomatopoeic representation of laughter.

Ha ha ha or hahaha may also refer to:

== Film ==
- Ha! Ha! Ha! (film), a 1934 Betty Boop animated short
- Hahaha, a 2010 South Korean film

== Music ==
- Ha!-Ha!-Ha!, a 1977 album by British pop group Ultravox
- Ha Ha Ha (album), a 2012 album by Australian singer-songwriter Natalie Gauci, or the title track
- "Ha Ha Ha", a 1980 single by American rock band Flipper
- "Ha, ha, ha" a song from the 1980 album Doživjeti stotu by Bijelo Dugme
- "Ha Ha Ha", a song from the 1997 album Sticker Happy by Eraserheads
- "Hahaha" (Lil Dicky song), a 2024 song by Lil Dicky
- "Hahaha", a 2018 song by Death Grips from Year of the Snitch
- "You (Ha Ha Ha)", a 2013 song by Charli XCX from True Romance
- "The Hahaha Song", the English name of "Gera Gera Po", a 2014 Japanese song
- HaHaHa Production, a Romanian record label

== See also ==
- Haha (disambiguation)
- Haha ha, a South Korean YouTuber
- HAHAHAHAHA, a 2020 Chinese reality series
