= Ho ho ho (disambiguation) =

Ho ho ho is onomatopoeia for laughter, often associated with Santa Claus.

Ho ho ho may also refer to:

- Ho Ho Ho (film), a 2009 Romanian film

== Music ==
- Ho Ho Ho (album), a Christmas album by RuPaul
- "Ho Ho Ho", song by Orange Range from their "Kizuna" single
- "Ho Ho Ho", song by Sia from Everyday Is Christmas
- "Ho Ho Ho", song by Liz Phair
- "Ho Ho Ho", song by Fischer-Z from Fish's Head
- "Ho Ho Ho", song by the Chipmunks from Undeniable
- "Ho! Ho! Ho! (Who'd Be a Turkey at Christmas)", song by Elton John from Lady Samantha
- "Ho Ho Ho", song by Teya and Salena

== See also ==
- Hoohoo (disambiguation)
- Haha (disambiguation)
- Ha Ha Ha (disambiguation)
- Hoho (disambiguation)
- Ho (disambiguation)
- "Ho, Ho, Ho, We Say Hey, Hey, Hey", a 2008 single from Merzedes Club
- Yo Ho Ho, a 1981 Bulgarian drama film
- HoHOHOHO, Holmium(III) hydroxide
