= Mr. Gae =

EP by Gary
- Released: January 15, 2014
- Genre: Hip hop
- Length: 23:40
- Label: Leessang Company, Loen Entertainment

Gary chronology
| Mr. Gae (2014) | 2002 (2015) |

Mr. Gae is the first EP by South Korean rapper Gary. The album was released on January 15, 2014, by Leessang Company and Loen Entertainment. The album was both critically and commercially successful, making it to 4 on the Gaon Album Chart.

== Track listing ==
| No. | Title | Length |
|---|---|---|
| 1. | "Zotto Mola" | 3:41 |
| 2. | "Shower Later" (featuring Crush) | 4:06 |
| 3. | "Drunken Night Tune" (featuring Jung-in) | 4:02 |
| 4. | "Mr. Gae" (featuring Juvie Train and Kye Bum Zu) | 4:05 |
| 5. | "Zotto Mola" (Inst) | 3:41 |
| 6. | "Mr. Gae" (Inst) | 4:05 |
| Total length: | | 23:40 |

== Chart positions ==
| Chart (2014) | Peak position |
|---|---|
| South Korean Albums (Circle) | 4 |
