= Vocal Play =

South Korean television show

- Promotional poster for season 1
- Hangul: 보컬플레이
- RR: Bokeol peullei
- MR: Pok'ŏl p'ŭllei
- Genre: Reality television Variety show
- Starring: Yoo Se-yoon; Oh Sang-jin
- Country of origin: South Korea
- Original language: Korean
- No. of seasons: 2
- No. of episodes: 25

Production
- Producer: Jeon Gyeong-nam
- Production location: South Korea
- Running time: 80 minutes

Original release
- Network: Channel A
- Release: November 10, 2018 – December 28, 2019

Vocal Play (Korean: 보컬플레이) is a South Korean variety show program on Channel A starring Noh Hong-chul and Oh Sang-jin as the main host for season 1 and Yoo Se-yoon and Oh Sang-jin for season 2. The first season aired on Channel A, it started on November 10, 2018 and ended on January 26, 2019. The second season started on October 5, 2019. It is distributed and syndicated by Channel A every Saturday at 22:20 (KST).

== Synopsis ==
This is the 1st Korean A cappella music show where the singers have to sing without instrumental accompaniment.

== Rules ==
=== Season 1 ===
Performers are further split into 4 types: A cappella groups, Beatboxers, 4 hidden Solo Vocalists and Solo Vocalists. Each producer must pick at least 1 of each category. For pure singers, music with vocals removed (MR) can only be used in round 1. As they perform 100 Vocal Peers vote to unlock the draft wall for the producers to see the acts. The wall can only be unlocked once it reaches 70 votes. The producers can vote for the rights to mentor them.

Once the teams are assembled, each type of performers will first compete against each other from different producer's teams. Afterwards, they will compete as a team and collaborate in various stages.

== Casts ==
=== Season 1 ===
==== MC ====
- Noh Hong-chul
- Oh Sang-jin

==== Producers ====
- Yoon Sang
- Yoon Il-sang
- Muzie
- Sweet Sorrow

==== Participants ====
- Khan
- H-Has
- Hiss
- MayTree
- VRomance
- EXIT
- G2
- Bae Da-hae
- Paradise
- Hanhae
- Mighty
- Kwon Hyuk-soo
- Wing
- Greg
- Park Ji-min
- U Sung-eun

=== Season 2 ===
==== MC ====
- Oh Sang-jin
- Yoo Se-yoon

==== Judges ====
- Ailee
- Kim Hyun-cheol
- Sweet Sorrow
- Lee Seok-hoon

== Ratings ==
- Ratings listed below are the individual corner ratings of Vocal Play. (Note: Individual corner ratings do not include commercial time, which regular ratings include.)
- In the ratings below, the highest rating for the show will be in red and the lowest rating for the show will be in blue each year.

=== Season 1 ===
Ep. #	Original Airdate	AGB Nielsen Ratings
1	November 10, 2018	1.1%
2	November 17, 2018	0.8%
3	November 24, 2018	0.7%
4	December 1, 2018	0.6%
5	December 8, 2018	0.6%
6	December 15, 2018	0.5%
7	December 22, 2018	0.4%
8	December 29, 2018	0.5%
9	January 5, 2019	1.0%
10	January 12, 2019	0.7%
11	January 19, 2019	0.4%
12	January 26, 2019	0.4%

=== Season 2 ===
Ep. #	Original Airdate	AGB Nielsen Ratings
1	October 5, 2019	0.5%
2	October 12, 2019	0.5%
3	October 19, 2019	0.461%
4	October 26, 2019	0.3%
5	November 2, 2019	0.4%
6	November 9, 2019	0.4%
7	November 16, 2019	0.4%
8	November 24, 2019	0.4%
9	November 30, 2019	0.4%
10	December 7, 2019	0.5%
11	December 14, 2019	0.4%
12	December 22, 2019	0.5%
13	December 28, 2019	0.5%
