= Entertainer (TV series) =

2016 South Korean television series

- Promotional poster
- Genre: Romance comedy Music
- Written by: Yoo Young-ah
- Directed by: Hong Sung-chang
- Starring: Ji Sung; Lee Hye-ri; Kang Min-hyuk; Chae Jung-an
- Country of origin: South Korea
- Original language: Korean
- No. of episodes: 18

Production
- Executive producer: Lee Yong-suk
- Producers: Jung Ah-reum; Park Hyun-seo
- Running time: 60 minutes
- Production companies: Imagine Asia; Happy Campus Projects

Original release
- Network: SBS
- Release: April 20 – June 16, 2016

Entertainer (Korean: 딴따라; RR: Ttanttara) is a 2016 South Korean television series starring Ji Sung, Lee Hye-ri, Kang Min-hyuk, and Chae Jung-an. It aired on SBS from April 20, 2016 to June 16, 2016 on Wednesdays and Thursdays at 21:55 (UTC+9) for 18 episodes.

== Synopsis ==
Shin Suk-ho (Ji Sung) is a successful manager who works for KTOP entertainment, one of the largest entertainment companies in South Korea. After deciding to become independent and trying to develop his own company, Mango Entertainment, he suddenly faces many hardships and loses everything he has and goes to prison. After release, while he is trying to find a way back to life, he finds a talented high school student, Jo Ha-neul (Kang Min-hyuk) and decides to turn him into a famous singer. But he realizes that Ha-neul is an ex-convict and was accused for sexual abuse by his friend, Lee Ji-Young (Jo Yun-seo).
Shin Suk-ho starts a new journey with Ha-neul, forms the group 'Entertainer Band' (Ddandara band/ 딴다라 벤드), and tries to put things in their right place with the help of band members, his loyal friends and Jung Geu-rin (Lee Hye-ri), Ha-neul's hard-working sister.

== Cast ==
=== Main ===
- Ji Sung as Shin Suk-ho

Suk-ho works as a director of a big entertainment company, KTOP Entertainment. He is a cunning and self-centered person in work fields. At first he only wants to use Jo Ha-neul to save his company and promises him to make him a well-known singer, but after getting to know him better, he has a change of heart and sincerely wants to make Ha-neul a successful musician. Shin Suk-ho has great observations to find talented 'Entertainers'.

- Lee Hye-ri as Jung Geu-rin

Geu-rin is the guardian/big sister of Jo Ha-neul. She lost her parents when she was in high school and Ha-neul's family raised her in the absence of their dead son, Jo Ha-neul's big brother. They took care of her like she's their real daughter. So after their death in a car accident, she promised to repay their kindness by taking care of their only son, Ha-neul. Before she became 'Entertainer Band/tantara band' manager, she used to work 3-4 part-time jobs a day because of financial problems.

- Kang Min-hyuk as Jo Ha-neul
  - Song Joon-hee as young Ha-neul

Jo Ha-neul is a high school student in his last year. Even though he is cold on the outside, he is actually a kind teenager with an amazing talent in music. His life was ruined after his best friend, Lee Ji-young, accused him for sexually abusing her. With the record he had, he has faced rejection, hatred and was bullied at school. It also made it harder for him to become a musician, because there will be negative attitude from people towards him, his band-mates, Geu-rin, and Suk-ho. Shin Suk-ho decides to help him by looking for the real abuser in order to clear Ha-neul's name.

- Chae Jung-an as Yeo Min-joo

Min-joo is Suk-ho's loyal work-mate and friend for 10 years. She always helps him in hardships. She is working in 'Ocean Music'. She seems to have an interest in Suk-ho but he never sees her that way. The truth is that she is the youngest daughter of a rich family which runs a big company, but she wants to keep her identity as a secret. After quitting 'Ocean Music', she becomes the director of 'Mango Entertainment' (Suk-ho's company) while Suk-ho is the CEO.

=== Supporting ===
==== KTOP ====
- Jeon No-min as Lee Joon-suk

He is the CEO of one of Korea's biggest entertainment company, KTOP Entertainment. His outward appearance seems to be very kind, but he is very obsessed with his work. He would do anything to make Suk-ho go through hardships and bring down his entertainment company. He had a connection with the reason for Jo Ha-neul's brother death, because of that he becomes more motivated to bring down 'Ddanddara Band'.

- Heo Joon-suk as Kim Joo-han

Kim Joo-han used to be Suk-ho's assistant at KTOP Entertainment. Before Suk-ho departures from the company, the CEO of KTOP ordered him to backstab Suk-ho and betray him in exchange for the position as the new director. Kim Joo-han seems to have had a connection with Lee Ji-young's abuse case.

- Jo Yun-seo as Lee Ji-young

Lee Ji-Young is a girl from Busan and used to be Jo Ha-Neul best friend. Her dream was always to be in a girl group . She is also a big fan of popular boyband 'Jackson', she threatened Kim Joo-han to make her become a KTOP trainee and if not she will tell the media that the one who sexually abused her was actually Ji-nu from boyband 'Jackson' and not Jo Ha-Neul. Before her dream came true in KTOP, she was rejected multiple times and failed on many auditions. Because of her special way, she immediately got into a girl group without training session. She takes the name 'Luna', the stage name of a KTOP trainee of 8 years who left because of her.

- Ahn Hyo-seop as Ji Noo

Ji-nu is a member and the leader of popular boyband 'Jackson' under KTOP. He had a close relationship with Shin Suk-ho who is also the person who created 'Jackson'. Before becoming boyband member, he was a backup dancer but Suk-ho helped him to become a singer. He was going through a state of depression and decided to take medication without Suk-ho knowing. He was dating his fellow labelmate from girl group 'Lucy Girls' named Song-Hee. There is a story that Lee Ji-Young hid, that made Ji-nu believe that the real culprit is him and not Jo Ha-Neul. But both of them are innocent and are victims of Lee Ji-Young's scheming.

==== People around Shin Suk-ho ====
- Jung Man-sik as Jang Man-sik

Jang Man-sik is a songwriter who has worked with KTOP Entertainment. He has a long friendship with Suk-ho and Min-joo. He likes Min-joo so much that his apartment passcode is Min-joo's Birthday.

- Ahn Nae-sang as President Byun

President Byun is the owner of a music rehearsing studio that is used by 'Entertainer Band/tantara band' located in Hongdae. He used to work at KTOP and was a work-mate of KTOP CEO. After leaving KTOP he decided to become a 'church music' director. He knows Shin Suk-ho since the days he was still at KTOP. He knows the real truth of Jo Ha-neul's brother death, and that's the reason why he decided to leave KTOP because of the feeling of guilt.

==== Members of the band ====
- Gong Myung as Kyle / Lee Bang-geul

Kyle is a genius musician who studied classic guitar at Juilliard. He decided to quit Juilliard to find a new way. He was scouted by Shin Suk-ho after he saw him performing as an extra guitarist in a random indie-band performance. At first he decided to quit from 'tantara band/Ddandara band" because Ha-neul was an ex-convict, but then he decided to trust Ha-neul. He is the guitarist.

- Lee Tae-sun as Na Yeon-soo

Yun-soo is a humble and polite person who is also a single dad, and had worked as a guitarist at a nightclub. He met Shin Suk-ho in the club and is thankful to Suk-ho for understanding that his guitar is precious for him and only he can use his guitar. He felt respected as an 'entertainer'. After he heard the news that Shin Suk-ho had built his own company, he comes to him and asks him for a job. At first Suk-ho refuses because he is a single dad of a son (named Chan-hee), but then Suok-ho decides to accept him into the band. He is the bassist. He likes Yeo min-joo.

- Byung Hun as Seo Jae-hoon

Jae-hoon is a student at Seoul University and belongs to a rich family. He loves playing drums in his free time. He seems like a Mama's boy and since childhood, he has followed whatever his mother wanted. After thinking for a while, he decides to leave his mother's dream and to follow his own dream focusing as a drummer of 'tantara band/Ddandara Band'.

=== Extended ===
- Jo Bok-rae as Jo Sung-hyun, Jo Ha-neul's older brother
- Kim Ho-chang
- Kim Min-chan
- Jung Kyu-soo as Shin Suk-ho's father
- Sung Byung-sook as Shin Suk-ho's mother
- Choi Ji-na as Jae-hoon's mother
- Kim Sung-kyum as Min-joo's father

=== Special appearances ===
- Kwon Nara as Song-Hee (cameo ep.1)

She is a member of girl group named 'Lucy girl' and she is dating Ji-nu, member of boy-band 'Jackson'. Both of their group belong to the same company 'KTOP Entertainment'.

- Dojoon (cameo ep.2)
- Hajoon (cameo ep.2)
- Jaehyeong (cameo ep.2)
- Park Shin-hye as Assistant Manager Park (cameo ep.3)

She is seen bringing coffees to Mango's building with Yeo Min-Joo

- Kim Kiri (cameo ep. 4)

He is a personal trainer in KTOP originally hired by Shin Suk-ho, he is the one who give information to Suk-ho about Lee Ji-young in KTOP.

- Min Do-hee as Luna (cameo ep.4)

She is a KTOP Entertainment trainee for eight years, but she suddenly leaves the group near her debut because she doesn't accept that her part is shared with Lee Ji-young. After her departure her stage name 'Luna' is given to Lee Ji-young.

- Lee Sun-bin (cameo ep.4)
- Ken (cameo ep.7)

Special MC of The show program along with Zhoumi and Yerin.

- Yerin (cameo ep.7)

Special MC of The show program along with Zhoumi and Ken.

- Zhou Mi (cameo ep.7)

Special MC of The show program along with Ken and Yerin.

- Seo Kang-joon as Lee Sang-won (cameo ep.7 & 8)

A famous classical guitarist who visited Korea for a concert and a former acquaintance of Kyle in Juilliard. He and Kyle are the only South Korean students majoring in classical guitar at Juilliard, because of that they become best friends. Kyle is always compared to Sang-won who always got first place, that's the reason why their friendship once died but now they become close again.

- Oh Jung-se as Prosecutor (ep. 7 & 9)

A prosecutor who was asked by CEO Lee to do an investigation into ratings-boosting of songs with the evidence of Shin Suk-ho's manufacturing Jackson's ratings given to him by Lee.

- M.A.P6 as 'Jackson' members

Members of the boy group Jackson.

- Jang Yoon-jeong as Radio DJ (cameo ep. 9)

An arrogant Radio DJ who ignores Jung Geu-rin's favor.

- Jo Eun-ji as Site manager (ep. 10)

A site manager and fan of Jo Ha-neul who books the Entertainer Band for a performance at an event for elderly people. The booking helped the band gain greater recognition on social media.

- Kim So-hye as Choi Ga-eun (Ep. 11 & 12)

Yun-soo's first love and Chan-hee's biological mom. She suddenly appeared when 'Ddandara Band' gained popularity, at first 'Ddanddara Band' members thought Ga-eun wants to come back to them because Yeon-soo is popular now. But actually she wants to bid good bye to Chan-hee for the last time because she is already married to someone. After the family reunite, they pray for each other and let go their past story to live a new life.

- Jung Chan as Mr Choi (cameo ep. 17 & 18)

The CEO of Wild Company. Suk-ho originally offers him Entertainer Band to be part of Wild Company, but the plan didn't work out. He later makes an offer to buy CEO Lee Joon-suk's shares in KTOP Entertainment.

- Im Do-hwa^{1} (cameo ep. 18)

Special MC of The show program along with Lee Seung-hyub.

- Lee Seung-hyub (cameo ep. 18)

Special MC of The show program along with Kim Chan-mi.

- Park Eun-bin as Soo-hyun (cameo ep. 18)

A student who goes to the same university as Geu-rin. She later joins Entertainer Band as their new drummer. Ha-neul is interested in her.

- Lee Hyun-woo

== Original soundtrack ==
=== Part 1 ===
Track listing
No.	Title	Artist	Length
1.	"Tantara (딴따라)"	Gary ft. Miwoo	3:45
2.	"Tantara (딴따라)" (Inst.)		3:45
Total length:			7:30

=== Part 2 ===
Track listing
No.	Title	Artist	Length
1.	"To Your Dream (너의 꿈에)"	Suran	3:48
2.	"To Your Dream (너의 꿈에)" (Inst.)		3:48
Total length:			7:36

=== Part 3 ===
Track listing
No.	Title	Artist	Length
1.	"A Stray Child (길 잃은 아이)"	Han Seo-Yoon	4:07
2.	"A Stray Child (길 잃은 아이)" (Inst.)		4:07
Total length:			8:14

=== Part 4 ===
Track listing
No.	Title	Artist	Length
1.	"I See You"	Kang Min-hyuk	3:04
2.	"I See You" (Inst.)		3:04
Total length:			6:08

=== Part 5 ===
Track listing
No.	Title	Artist	Length
1.	"Send Me Your Pictures (사진 찍어 보내 줘)"	Gaeko	4:09
2.	"Send Me Your Pictures (사진 찍어 보내 줘)" (Inst.)		4:09
Total length:			8:18

=== Part 6 ===
Track listing
No.	Title	Artist	Length
1.	"A Love Before (사랑 앞에서)"	Jung Eun-ji	4:27
2.	"A Love Before (사랑 앞에서)" (Inst.)		4:27
Total length:			8:54

=== Part 7 ===
Track listing
No.	Title	Artist	Length
1.	"I Can't Live Without You (니가 있어야 살아)"	Ailee ft. Truedy	3:38
2.	"I Can't Live Without You (니가 있어야 살아)" (Inst.)		3:38
Total length:			7:16

=== Part 8 ===
Track listing
No.	Title	Artist	Length
1.	"Go Ahead, Cry (울어도 돼)"	Jo Bok-rae	4:04
2.	"Go Ahead, Cry (울어도 돼)" (Inst.)		4:04
Total length:			8:08

=== Part 9 ===
Track listing
No.	Title	Artist	Length
1.	"Move (이사)"	Giriboy	3:40
2.	"Move (이사)" (Inst.)		3:40
Total length:			7:20

== Ratings ==
In the table below, italic numbers represent the lowest ratings and bold numbers represent the highest ratings.

Ep.	Broadcast date	Average audience share			
Ep.	Broadcast date	TNmS		AGB Nielsen	
Ep.	Broadcast date	Nationwide	Seoul	Nationwide	Seoul
1	April 20, 2016	5.2%	6.8%	6.2%	7.2%
2	April 21, 2016	6.6%	7.7%	6.6%	7.6%
3	April 27, 2016	5.5%	7.2%	7.2%	8.5%
4	April 28, 2016	7.6%	9.6%	8.3%	9.3%
5	May 4, 2016	5.6%	7.7%	7.4%	8.8%
6	May 5, 2016	**8.2%**	**10.8%**	**8.7%**	10.2%
7	May 11, 2016	6.4%	8.6%	7.8%	9.3%
8	May 12, 2016	7.0%	8.3%	8.6%	**10.3%**
9	May 18, 2016	7.0%	8.8%	7.8%	8.8%
10	May 19, 2016	6.8%	7.4%	7.7%	8.8%
11	May 25, 2016	5.7%	7.3%	7.5%	8.7%
12	May 26, 2016	7.1%	8.5%	8.6%	9.9%
13	June 1, 2016	5.9%	7.8%	8.4%	10.0%
14	June 2, 2016	6.8%	7.9%	8.1%	10.0%
15	June 8, 2016	5.2%	6.7%	7.2%	8.7%
16	June 9, 2016	7.1%	8.8%	7.9%	8.8%
17	June 15, 2016	5.2%	6.1%	7.5%	9.0%
18	June 16, 2016	6.4%	7.6%	7.8%	8.9%
Average		6.41%	7.98%	7.74%	9.04%

== Awards and nominations ==
Year	Award	Category	Recipient	Result
2016	5th APAN Star Awards	Best New Actor	Kang Min-hyuk	Nominated
2016	SBS Drama Awards	Top Excellence Award, Actor in a Romantic Comedy Drama	Ji Sung	Nominated
2016	SBS Drama Awards	Top Excellence Award, Actress in a Romantic Comedy Drama	Lee Hye-ri	Nominated
2016	SBS Drama Awards	Excellence Award, Actor in a Romantic Comedy Drama	Kang Min-hyuk	Won
2016	SBS Drama Awards	Excellence Award, Actor in a Romantic Comedy Drama	Jeon No-min	Nominated
2016	SBS Drama Awards	Excellence Award, Actress in a Romantic Comedy Drama	Chae Jung-an	Nominated
2016	SBS Drama Awards	Special Acting Award, Actor in a Romantic Comedy Drama	Ahn Nae-sang	Nominated
2016	SBS Drama Awards	New Star Award	Lee Hye-ri	Won

== International broadcast ==
The series is also set to air in Southeast Asia (Singapore, Malaysia, and Indonesia) through Sony's Pay-TV channel ONE on Thursdays and Fridays at 20:55 (SST|MYT), 19:55 (WIB) within 24 hours of its first telecast in South Korea.

In the United States, the drama airs in the Los Angeles DMA free, over-the-air on Asian American oriented channel, LA 18 KSCI-TV (channel 18) with English subtitles, Wed–Thurs 9:15 pm, from May 11 to June 30, 2016.

In Myanmar, the drama airs on the free-to-air channel, 5 Plus (5 Network's sub channel) with Myanmar (Burmese) subtitle under the title "သံစဉ်နှလုံးသား", Sat–Sun 8:00 pm, started on 18 November 2017 and it ended on 20 January 2018.

In India, this drama streams on online video streaming platform 'Viu' with English subtitles.

== Notes ==
- ^{1}Credited as Kim Chan-mi.
