= Kko Kko Tours Single Single =

- Genre: Reality television
- Country of origin: South Korea
- Original language: Korean
- No. of seasons: 2
- No. of episodes: 10

Original release
- Network: KBS2
- Release: September 21 – November 23, 2008

Related
- Happy Sunday

Kko Kko Tours Single Single (Korean: 꼬꼬관광 싱글싱글) is a South Korean celebrity dating reality-variety show that aired on KBS2 from September 21 to November 23, 2008 as a segment in Happy Sunday. It was hosted by former Country Kko Kko members, Tak Jae-hoon and Shin Jung-hwan.

== Format ==
The show features male and female celebrities who will be paired up and go on dates to get to know each other. The celebrities invite someone on the show to go with them during the trip. In the beginning of the season, each person will reveal who they invited and in the last episode, they will decide who they want to spend a vacation with.

== Season 1 ==
The first episode was aired on September 21, 2008 and was filmed in Saipan. In the first episode, the show introduced the celebrities who will be participating in the show. Girls' Generation's Tiffany, Park Jung-ah, Amy, Jung Shi-ah and Hong In-young were the female guests, while the male guests were Shinhwa's Lee Min-woo, Shin Dong-wook, Tim, Gil, and volleyball player Moon Sung-min.

During a segment in the second episode, each person revealed the person they invited through a heart-shaped picture on a shirt they're wearing. The person reads a letter they wrote and removes the heart sticker on their shirts to reveal a photo of the person they wanted to go on a vacation with.

=== Female guests ===
- Shi-ah - Dong-wook
- In-young - Tim
- Amy - Min-woo
- Tiffany - Min-woo
- Jung-ah - Sung-min

=== Male guests ===
- Tim - Jung-ah
- Sung-min - Tiffany
- Min-woo - In-young
- Dong-wook - Jung-ah
- Gil - Amy and Shi-ah

In the last episode, each male guest will approach the female guest they want to spend the rest of the vacation with and the female guest will decide whether or not to accept him. If a guest ends up without a partner after the selection, he or she will leave by themselves.

=== Final couples ===
- Lee Min-woo and Amy
- Moon Sung-min and Hong In-young
- Tim and Tiffany

== Season 2 ==
The second season premiered on November 2, 2008 with the same hosts. Jung Shi-ah, Amy, Lee Min-woo, Shin Dong-wook and Gil returned for the second season. New guests were also introduced in the first episode. Girls' Generation's Yuri, jazz pianist Jin Bora and Kim Shi-hyang for the female guests, 2PM's Chansung and actor Jo Dong-hyuk for the male guests. The second season was filmed in Jeju Island.

Similar to the first season, on the first episode of the show, the guests reveal the person they want to go on a vacation with, but instead of shirts, the photos are on heart-shaped fans.

=== Female guests ===
- Shi-hyang - Min-woo
- Bora - Shin Jung-hwan
- Yuri - Gil

=== Male guests ===
- Chansung - Shi-ah
- Dong-hyuk - Yuri

Like the previous season, the guests pair up for the final selection, but instead of the male guests, the female guests will approach the men and the men will choose whether or not to accept.

=== Final couples ===
- Shin Dong-wook and Jin Bora
- Chansung and Jung Shi-ah
- Lee Min-woo and Amy
- Jo Dong-hyuk and Yuri

== Cancellation ==
The show was cancelled due to its high production costs and low ratings. It was replaced by a new season of Immortal Songs.
