= The Voice of Korea =

South Korean television series

- Created by: John de Mol Jr.
- Presented by: Kim Jin-pyo; Jang Sung-kyu
- Judges: Shin Seung-hun; Baek Ji-young; Kangta; Gil; Kim Jong-kook; BoA; Sung Si-kyung; Dynamic Duo
- Country of origin: South Korea
- Original language: Korean
- No. of seasons: 3
- No. of episodes: 30

Production
- Executive producer: Oh Kwang-suk
- Producers: Lee Sang-yoon; Hwang Sung-ho; Jeon Ji-hyun
- Production locations: Seoul, South Korea
- Production companies: CJ ENM; Talpa (2012–2013); ITV Studios (2020)

Original release
- Network: Mnet
- Release: 10 February 2012 – 5 May 2013
- Release: 29 May – 10 July 2020

The Voice of Korea (Korean: 보이스 코리아) is a South Korean reality singing competition and local version of The Voice first broadcast as The Voice of Holland. Its first season started on February 10, 2012, on Mnet. The second and final season started on February 22, 2013, on Mnet. A reboot was announced in February 2020, and premiered on May 29, 2020.

One of the important premises of the show is the quality of the singing talent. Four coaches, themselves popular performing artists, train the talents in their group and occasionally perform with them. Talents are selected in blind auditions, where the coaches cannot see, but only hear the auditionee.

== Coaches ==
Coaches of The Voice of Korea

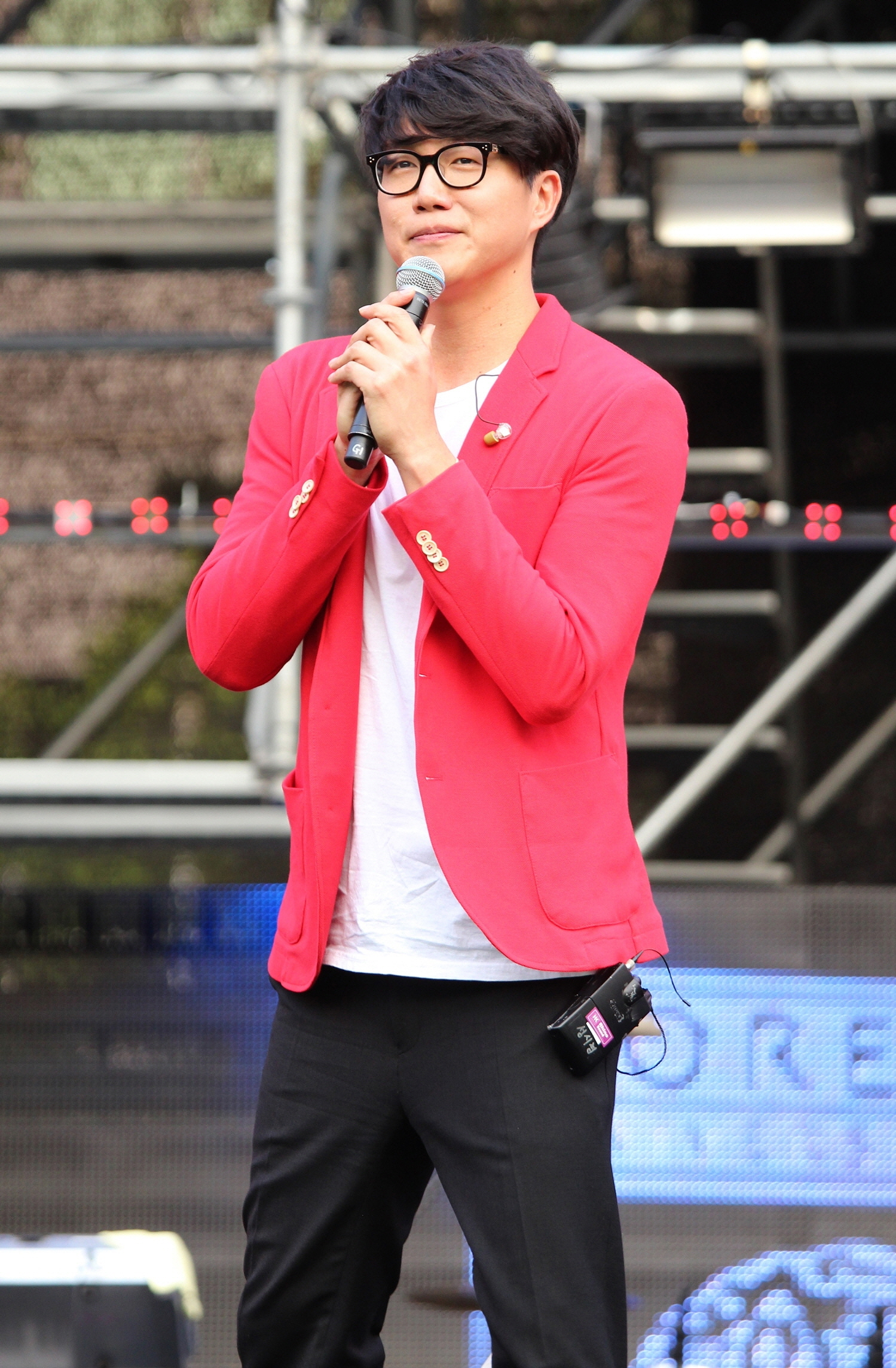
Sung Si-kyung

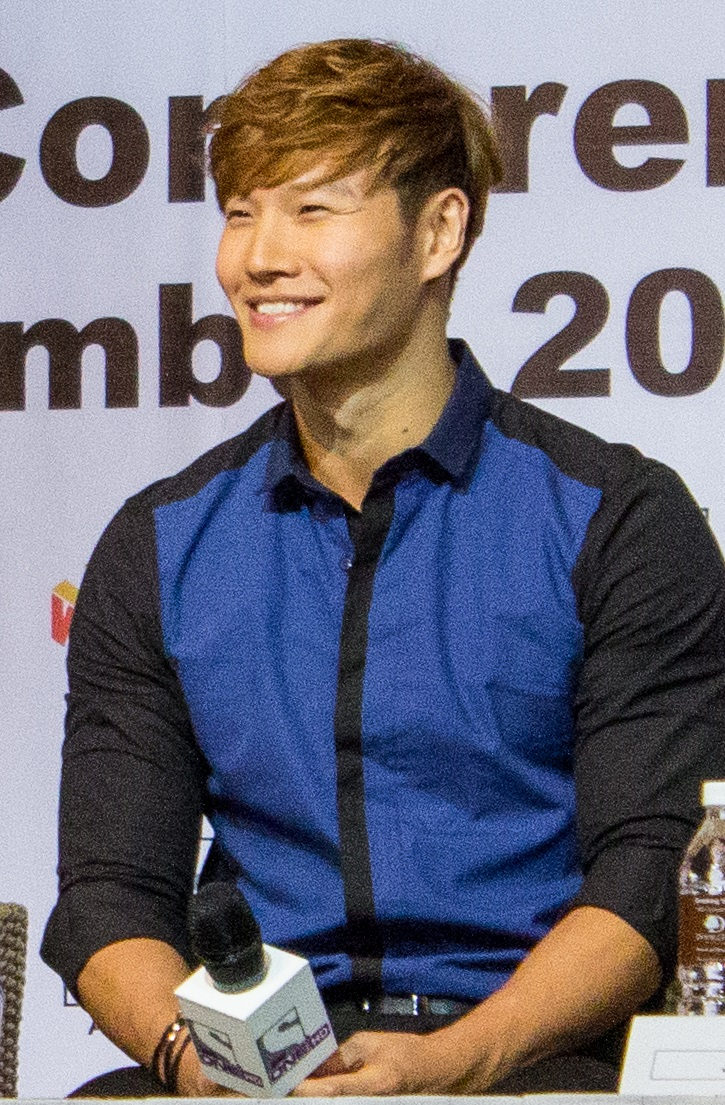
Kim Jong-kook

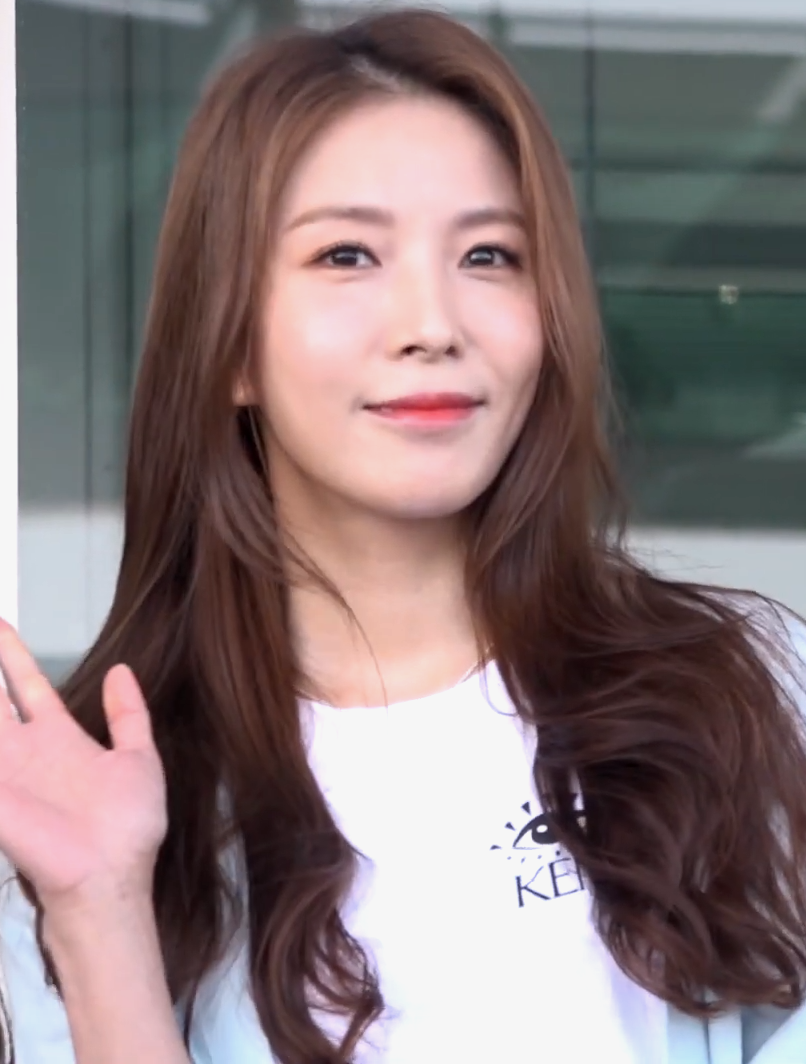
BoA

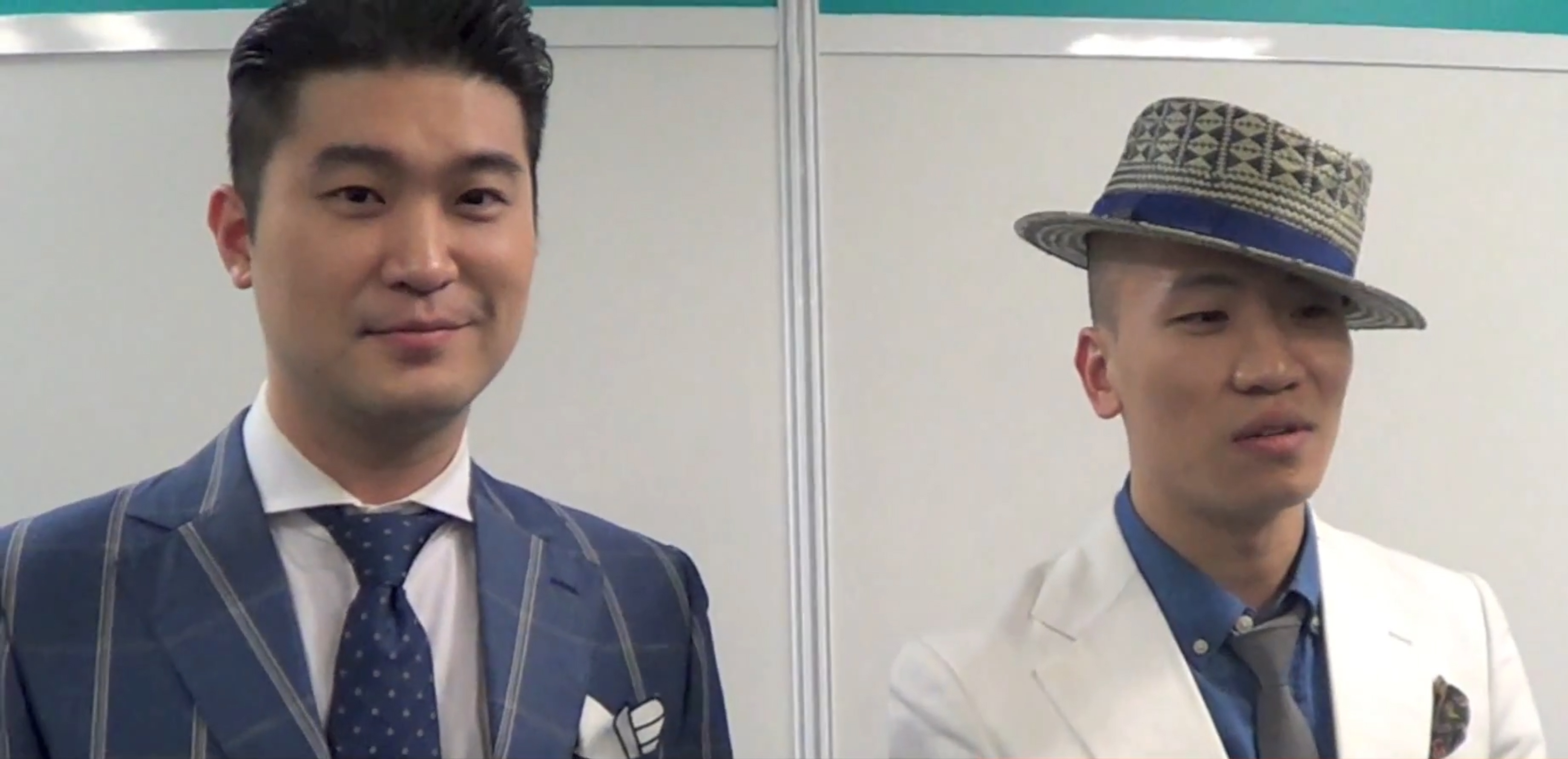
Dynamic Duo

=== Seasons 1 and 2 ===
- Kangta
- Gill
- Shin Seung-hun
- Baek Ji-young

=== Season 3 (2020) ===
- Sung Si-kyung
- Kim Jong-kook
- BoA
- Dynamic Duo

== Season summary ==
Artist's info

Team Kangta Team Shin Team Baek Team Gill	Team Si-kyung Team Jong-kook Team BoA Team Dynamic Duo

Season	First aired	Last aired	Winner	Runner-up	Third Place	Fourth Place	Winning coach	Hosts	Coaches (order)			
Season	First aired	Last aired	Winner	Runner-up	Third Place	Fourth Place	Winning coach	Hosts	1	2	3	4
1	Feb 10, 2012	May 11, 2012	Son Seung-yeon	Yoo Sung-eun	Ji Se-hee	Woo Hye-mi	Shin Seung-hun	Kim Jin-pyo	Kangta	Shin	Baek	Gill
2	Feb 22, 2013	May 5, 2013	Lee Ye-jun	Yoon Sung-ki	Yoo Da-eun	Lee Si-mon	Kangta	Kim Jin-pyo	Kangta	Shin	Baek	Gill
3	May 29, 2020	July 10, 2020	Kim Ji-hyun	Park Daeun	Jeon Chulmin	Kim Minkyung	BoA	Jang Sung-kyu	Si-kyung	Jong-kook	BoA	Dynamic Duo

=== Season 1 (2012) ===
Son Seung-yeon won the first season with Shin Seung-hun as her coach. Yoo Sung-eun finished as runner-up, followed by Ji Se-hee and Woo Hye-mi in third and fourth places, respectively.

Each coach was allowed to bring six artists to the live shows.

Logo used in the first season.

Team Kangta	Team Seung-hun	Team Ji-young	Team Gill
Ji Se-hee	Son Seung-yeon	Yoo Sung-eun	Woo Hye-mi
Jung Na-hyun	Lee So-jung	Kang Mi-jin	Ha Ye-na
Bae Keun-seok	Jung Seung-won	Huh Gong	Jang Eun-ah
Hong Heok-su	Jang Jae-ho	Park Tae-young	Choi Jun-young
Jang Jung-woo	Lee Eun-ah	In Ji-yoon	Shin Cho-yi
Kim Hyun-min	Sam Koo	Shin Ji-hyun	Nam Il

=== Season 2 (2013) ===
Logo used in the second season.

The series was renewed for a second season with all coaches returning. Lee Ye-jun of Team Kangta won the second season with Yoon Sung-ki in second. Yoo Da-eun in third, and Lee Si-mon in fourth.

Each coach was allowed to advance three artists to the live shows.

Team Kangta	Team Seung-hun	Team Ji-young	Team Gill
Lee Ye-jun	Yoon Sung-ki	Lee Si-mon	Yoo Da-eun
Shin Yu-mi	Bae Du-hun	Song Pu-reum	Kim Hyun-ji
Lee Jung-seok	Park Eui-sung	Ham Sung-hun	Song Su-bin

=== Season 3 (2020) ===
Logo used in the third season.

A third season was produced after a seven-year hiatus. Sung Si-kyung, Kim Jong-kook, BoA, and Dynamic Duo were introduced as the new coaches. Television personality Jang Sung-kyu became the new host of the show.

Each coach was allowed to advance two artists to the live shows.

Team Si Kyung	Team Jong Kook	Team BoA	Team Dynamic Duo
Kim Yeji	Jung Yujin	Kim Ji-hyun	Park Changin
Jeon Chulmin	Park Daeun	Lee Saebom	Kim Minkyung
