= Son Seung-yeon =

South Korean singer (born 1993)

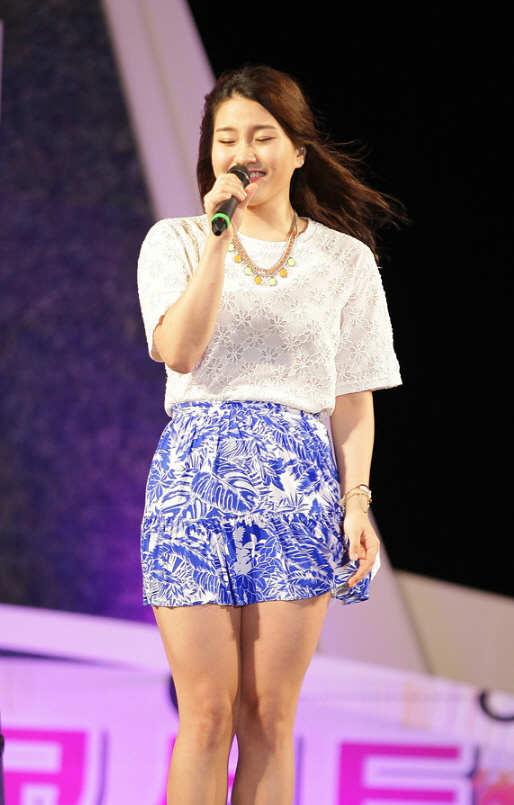
- Son in 2019

Background information
- Born: September 15, 1993 (age 33)
- Origin: Seoul, South Korea
- Genres: K-pop, R&B
- Occupation: Singer
- Years active: 2012–present
- Labels: Catch Mop Entertainment, LOEN Entertainment

Korean name
- Hangul: 손승연
- RR: Son Seungyeon
- MR: Son Sŭngyŏn

Son Seung-yeon (Korean: 손승연; born September 15, 1993), also known as Sonnet Son, is a South Korean singer. She is a winner of The Voice of Korea and is a frequent guest on the singing competition show Immortal Songs 2.

== Discography ==
=== Albums ===
Title	Album details	Peak chart positions	Sales
Title	Album details	KOR	Sales
The Ugly Duckling, Fly Up (미운 오리의 날개짓)	Released: October 23, 2012; Label: Universal; Format: CD, digital download; Track listing: 1. Replay; 2. My Heart (가슴아 가슴아); 3. When The Moon Sets (저 달이 지면); 4. Though I Can't See You (보이지 않아도); 5. It's The End (끝이야); 6. I'm Only Yours	46	—N/a
Sonnet Blooms	Released: July 30, 2014; Label: Fortune Entertainment; Format: CD, digital download; Track listing: 1. Love Again; 2. I'm Not Crazy (feat. MC Sniper); 3. I Can Hear Your Voice; 4. I'm Okay, Now; 5. Everyday Different Tears; 6. Love Again (Inst.); 7. I'm Not Crazy (Inst.); 8. I Can Hear Your Voice (Inst.); 9. I'm Okay, Now (Inst.); 10. Everyday Different Tears (Inst.)	31	—N/a

=== Singles ===
Title	Year	Peak chart positions	Sales	Album
Title	Year	KOR	Sales	Album
As lead artist
"My Heart" (가슴아 가슴아)	2012	46	KOR: 141,753	The Ugly Duckling, Fly Up
"I'm Not Crazy" (미친게 아니라구요) feat. MC Sniper	2013	22	KOR: 315,218	Sonnet Blooms
"I Can Hear Your Voice" (너의 목소리가 들려)	2013	42	KOR: 90,293	Sonnet Blooms
"I'm Okay, Now" (살만해졌어)	2014	18	KOR: 135,968	Sonnet Blooms
"Everyday Different Tears" (매일 다른 눈물이)	2014	22	KOR: 83,489	Sonnet Blooms
"Love Again" (다시 너를)	2014	23	KOR: 100,397	Sonnet Blooms
"The First Snow's Falling" (첫눈이 온다구요)	2014	84	KOR: 46,290	Non-album singles
"Ms. Burgundy"	2016	57	KOR: 79,222	Non-album singles
"Without You" (보란듯이) feat. Andup	2016	29	KOR: 130,948	Non-album singles
"I'm Not a Warrior"	2019	TBA	TBA	Non-album singles
Collaborations
"Stand Up For You" with U Sung-eun, Woo Hye-mi, Ji Se-hui	2012	94	KOR: 35,209	The Voices
"Wistful" (바라만 보네요) with The One	2014	19	KOR: 217,411	Non-album single
"—" denotes releases that did not chart.

=== Soundtrack appearances ===
Title	Year	Peak chart positions	Sales	Album
Title	Year	KOR	Sales	Album
"Neoreul Doenoeda" (너를 되뇌다) feat. Romantisco	2012	49	KOR: 65,697	Golden Time OST
"False Hope" (희망고문) with Outsider	2013	63	KOR: 30,011	Mate OST
"Awkward Love" (서툰 사랑)	2014	87	KOR: 29,535	Wonderful Days OST
"Because It's You" (그대라서)	2015	—	KOR: 18,208	The King's Face OST
"All For You" (널 위한거야)	2015	—	KOR: 19,828	Warm and Cozy OST
"Love Is So Mean" (사랑 참 못됐다)	2018	—	—N/a	Grand Prince OST
"I Might Have Loved You First" (먼저 사랑할지 몰라)	2018	—	—N/a	The Undateables OST
"Bad Dream" (나쁜 꿈)	2018	—	—N/a	The Guest OST
"Shadow" (그림자) with Black Nine	2018	—	—N/a	Less Than Evil OST
"Close to Night"	2019	—	—N/a	Item OST
"Sad"	2020	—	—N/a	The World of the Married OST
"Bring It On"	2022	—	—N/a	Again My Life OST
"—" denotes releases that did not chart.

=== Other charted songs ===
Title	Year	Peak chart positions	Sales	Album
Title	Year	KOR	Sales	Album
"Stained" (물들어)	2012	42	KOR: 306,103	The Voice of Korea
"Rain and Your Story" (비와 당신의 이야기)	2012	49	KOR: 120,873	The Voice of Korea
"The Ugly Duckling" (미운오리새끼)	2012	37	KOR: 153,519	The Voice of Korea

== Filmography ==
=== Television shows ===
Year	Title	Role	Note
2012	The Voice of Korea	Contestant	Last winner
2014–present	Immortal Songs 2	Herself	
2015	100 People, 100 Songs	Herself	
2015	Immortal Songs 2	Contestant	Ep. 227
2016	Two Yoo Project Sugar Man	Herself	Ep.22
2016	Birth of Songs (노래의 탄생)	Herself	
2016	Duet Song Festival	Herself	Ep.7, 23–24, 27–28
2016	Two Yoo Project Sugar Man	Herself	Ep.34
2018	King of Mask Singer	Contestant	Ep.141–158 (as "The East Invincibility")
2022	Goal Girls	Cast Member	Season 2

==== Immortal Songs 2 ====
Years	Date (KBS World TV, YouTube)	Episode	Song Title (Note: Song title contains official KBS World TV Channel on Youtube with Immortal Songs 2 full episode link URL with time stamp at right before Son Seungyeon's performance.)	Score (Note: If a contestant on Immortal Songs 2 doesn't score high enough to win his or her first round, then that person's score is not shown. These are left blank in this table.)
2014	Jul 5, 2014	Lee Chihyun Special	다 가기 전에 Before it Fades Away (The One ft. Son Seungyeon)	431, Final Winner
2014	Aug 2, 2014	Summer Special Part 2: The Passion of Youth!	바람이려오 I Am Wind	415, Final Winner
2014	Aug 23, 2014	Cho Youngnam Special	지금 Now	413
2014	Aug 30, 2014	Yoon Bockhee Special	Move	—
2014	Sep 13, 2014	The Original Girl Group Special	마포종점 Mapo Station	411
2014	Sep 27, 2014	The Million-Seller Special (Part 2)	그 후로 오랫동안 For A Long Time After That	432
2014	Oct 11, 2014	Heat of the Saturday Night Special (Part 2)	못 찾겠다 꾀꼬리 I Can't Find You Nightingale	431, Final Winner
2014	Oct 25, 2014	Sing the Season of Autumn	가을을 남기고 간 사랑 "'Love That Left Autumn"	—
2014	Nov 1, 2014	Best Duo Special	사랑해요 I Love You (The One & Son Seungyeon)	—
2014	Nov 22, 2014	Legendary Folk Duos Special (Part 1)	등불 The Light of Hope	—
2014	Dec 6, 2014	The Fallen Stars In November	Bohemian Rhapsody	427
2014	Dec 20, 2014	Song Changsik Special (Part 2)	토함산 Toham Mountain (Son Seungyeon & Kim Kilee)	419
2015	Jan 31, 2015	Composer Kim Yeonggwang Special	잊게 해 주오 Help Me Forget	—
2015	Feb 7, 2015	Music Brings Joy to Families	한 마리 새가 되어 Flying Like A Bird	389
2015	Feb 28, 2015	Songwriter Yu Seungyup Special	제비처럼 Like a Swallow	—
2015	Mar 21, 2015	Kim Soohee Special	잃어버린 정 Lost Love	428
2015	Mar 28, 2015	Show Show Show, Return of the Stars (Part 1)	하숙생 Wanderer also called "The Lodger"	405, Final Winner
2015	May 23, 2015	The 7 Legends Special	빈대떡 신사 Poor Gentlemen (Kim Duksoo & Son Seungyeon)	—, All legends received a trophy
2015	Jun 6, 2015	Family Special	잠 못 드는 밤 비는 내리고 Sleepless Rainy Night (Son Seungyeon & her mother)	417
2015	Jul 4, 2015	Famous Cover Songs Special, Part 1	당신과 만난 이 날 The Day I Met You	—
2015	Jul 18, 2015	7 Divas Special	내 마음 깊은 곳의 너 You're Deep Inside My Heart (Ft. Ahn Kapsung)	427
2015	Oct 24, 2015	Lyricist Kim Sungon Special	흔적 Traces	425
2015	Oct 31, 2015	Boohwal's 30th Anniversary	Lonely Night	372
2015	Nov 7, 2015	The One-Year Anniversary of the Late Shin Haechul's Death	우리 앞에 생이 끝나갈 때 When Our Lives Are Almost Over	—
2015	Dec 12, 2015	Baek Zyoung Special	사랑 안 해 I Won't Love	—
2015	Dec 26, 2015	god Special	촛불 하나 One Candle (g.o.d song) (Ft. MIWOO, Lee Yejun, Ji Sehee, U Sungeun)	431, Final Winner
2016	Jan 9, 2016	The Immortal Big Match	누구 없소 Is Anyone There	—
2016	Feb 6, 2016	The Late Kim Kwangseok Special Part 1	일어나 Stand Up	391
2016	Feb 20, 2016	Lunar New Year Special	꿈 Dream	—
2016	Mar 19, 2016	Kim Jong Seo Special	플라스틱 신드롬 Plastic Syndrome (performed as member of Fierce Band)	437, Final Winner
2016	Apr 23, 2016	Park In Hee Special	하얀 조가비 White Shell	—
2016	May 21, 2016	Lyricist Kang Eun-kyung	금지된 사랑 Forbidden Love	421, Final Winner
2016	Jun 25, 2016	Hong Seo-beom Special	구인광고 Want Ad	431
2016	Jul 16, 2016	The Big Match for the first half of 2016	기억해줘 Remember	—
2016	Aug 20, 2016	Roo'ra Special	비밀은 없어 No Secrets (Son Seungyeon & Baechigi)	421
2016	Sep 3, 2016	7 Diva Special	전설 속의 누군가처럼 Unwritten Legend	439, Final Winner
2016	Oct 1, 2016	Chuseok Special with Nam Jim	나에게 애인이 있다면 If I Had a Lover (Son Seungyeon & her mother)	—
2016	Oct 29, 2016	Arirang Special	밀양 아리랑 Milyang Arirang	—
2017	Jan 28, 2017	Hye Eun Yi Special	제3한강교 The Third Bridge	—
2017	Nov 18, 2017	Kim Gwangseok Memorial Special	사랑했지만 Through I love you	—
2017	Nov 25, 2017	Composer Park Hyunjin Special	뿐이고 Only	—
2017	Dec 09, 2017	Composer Yoon Ilsang Special	보고 싶다 I Miss You	440
2017	Dec 30, 2017	Shin Joonghyun Special Part.2	아름다운 강산 Beautiful Country	—

==== King of Mask Singer ====
Generation #	Episode #	Round #	Song	Opponent	Result (Score)	Notes	Ref.
71	141	1	"Refusal" (거부; Big Mama)	Park Joo-hee	Win (67:32)	Advanced to the second round	
71	142	2	"U&I" (Ailee)	Oh Seung-yoon	Win (68:31)	Advanced to the third round	
71	142	3	"In the Dream" (꿈에; Lena Park)	Hui (Pentagon)	Win (82:17)	Advanced to the final round	
71	142	Final	Voting based on the first three songs	Ivy	Win (65:34)	Mask King 1st time	
72	144	Final	"Winter Love" (겨울사랑; The One)	Lee Chang-min (2AM/Homme)	Win (74:25)	Mask King 2nd time	
73	146	Final	"Y Si Fuera Ella" (혜야; Shinee)	Park Ji-yoon	Win (84:15)	Mask King 3rd time	
74	148	Final	"Love, Never Fade" (사랑, 결코 시들지 않는...; Seomoon Tak)	Yoo Hwe-seung (N.Flying)	Win (72:27)	Mask King 4th time	
75	150	Final	"Song of the Wind" (바람의 노래; Cho Yong-pil)	Kim Jae-hwan (Wanna One)	Win (66:33)	Mask King 5th time	
76	152	Final	"Shout" (Kim Kyung-ho)	Kim Chang-yeol (DJ DOC)	Win (71:28)	Mask King 6th time	
77	154	Final	"Love" (사랑; Yim Jae-beom)	Ji Se-hee	Win (57:42)	Mask King 7th time	
78	156	Final	"Moon's Fall" (달의 몰락; Kim Hyun-cheol)	Eunkwang (BtoB)	Win (59:40)	Mask King 8th time	
79	158	Final	"Sherlock (Clue + Note)" (셜록; Shinee)	Han Dong-geun	Lose (48:51)	Eliminated	

== Musical productions ==
Title	Years	Role	Location	Notes
The Bodyguard	2016-2017	Rachel Marron	LG Arts Center (Seoul, South Korea)	
The Bodyguard	2019-2020	Rachel Marron	LG Arts Center (Seoul, South Korea)	
Wicked	2021	Elphaba	Blue Square Shinhan Card Hall (Seoul, South Korea)	
Wicked	2021	Elphaba	Dream Theatre (Busan, South Korea)	
Six	2023	Catherine of Aragon	COEX Shinhan Card Artium (Seoul, South Korea)	
Six	2023	Catherine of Aragon	Sejong Arts Center (Sejong City, South Korea)	
Memphis	2023	Felicia Farrell	Chungmu Art Center Grand Theater (Seoul, South Korea)	
Memphis	2025	Felicia Farrell	Chungmu Art Center Grand Theater (Seoul, South Korea)	
Lempicka	2026	Rafaela	COEX Artium (Seoul, South Korea)	
Hell's Kitchen	2026	Ali	GS Art Center (Gangnam District, Seoul)	
Six	2026-2027	Catherine of Aragon	Hongik University Daehakro Art Center Grand Theater (Seoul, South Korea)	
