= Louie (rapper) =

- 황문섭
- Born: Hwang Mun-seob; April 30, 1990 (age 36); Seoul, South Korea
- Occupation: Rapper
- Spouse: U Sung-eun (m. 2021)
- Musical career
- Genre: Hip hop
- Instrument: Vocals
- Years active: 2011–present
- Labels: Grandline Entertainment; How Entertainment
- Member of: Geeks

Korean name
- Hangul: 황문섭
- RR: Hwang Munseop
- MR: Hwang Munsŏp

Hwang Mun-seob (Korean: 황문섭, born April 30, 1990), better known by his stage name Louie (루이), is a South Korean rapper and members of Geeks. He released his first album, Inspiration, on March 27, 2014.

== Personal life ==
Louie married singer U Sung-eun on July 11, 2021.

== Discography ==
=== Studio albums ===
| Title | Album details | Peak chart positions | Sales |
| Title | Album details | KOR | Sales |
|---|---|---|---|
| Hwang Mun-seob (황문섭) | Released: April 22, 2016; Label: How Entertainment, Grandline Entertainment, LOEN Entertainment; Formats: CD, digital download | 37 | KOR: 423 |

=== Extended plays ===
| Title | Album details | Peak chart positions | Sales |
| Title | Album details | KOR | Sales |
|---|---|---|---|
| Inspiration (영감) | Released: March 27, 2014; Label: WA Entertainment, Grandline Entertainment, LOEN Entertainment; Formats: CD, digital download | 31 | KOR: 558 |

=== Singles ===
| Title | Year | Peak chart positions | Sales (DL) | Album |
| Title | Year | KOR | Sales (DL) | Album |
As lead artist
| "At This Time" (이 시간에) feat. U Sung-eun, Young Luffy | 2013 | 18 | KOR: 169,454 | Inspiration |
| "Where You At" feat. Young Luffy | 2014 | 60 | KOR: 51,920 | Inspiration |
| "Side Mirror Girl" (사이드미러걸) feat. Sanchez | 2014 | 16 | KOR: 219,238 | Inspiration |
| "Just Go" (그냥가요) feat. Wheein | 2015 | 25 | KOR: 96,630 | Non-album single |
| "Wings" (날개) feat. U Sung-eun, Ryno | 2016 | — | —N/a | Hwang Mun-seob |
| "Shadow" (그림자) feat. Kwon Soon-il | 2016 | 53 | KOR: 37,691 | Hwang Mun-seob |
| "On the Four Lane Road" (사차선도로) feat. Yook Sung-jae | 2016 | — | KOR: 24,311 | Hwang Mun-seob |
Collaborations
| "Your Face" (니 얼굴) with Lee Hyun-woo | 2016 | 54 | KOR: 33,201 | Non-album singles |
| "Monitor Girl" (너에게만) with Soyou | 2017 | — | —N/a | Non-album singles |
Soundtrack appearances
| "Airplane" (비행기) feat. Hayana | 2017 | — | —N/a | Manhole OST |
| "YOLO" | 2017 | — | —N/a | Hip Hop Teacher OST |
| "Walk" feat. Ko Young-bae and Froom | 2019 | — | —N/a | The Secret Life of My Secretary OST |
"—" denotes releases that did not chart.

== Filmography ==
=== Variety show ===
| Year | Title | Network | Notes | Ref. |
|---|---|---|---|---|
| 2020 | King of Mask Singer | MBC | Contestant as "Memil-muk" (episode 283) | |
