= Woo Hye-mi =

South Korean singer (1988–2019)

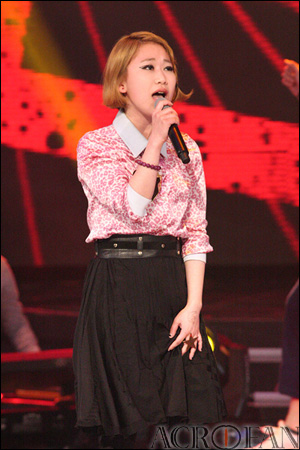
- Woo in 2016

Background information
- Born: April 6, 1988; South Korea
- Died: September 21, 2019 (aged 31) Seoul, South Korea
- Genres: K-pop
- Occupation: Singer
- Years active: 2012, 2015–2019
- Labels: Leessang Company; Downtown E&M

Korean name
- Hangul: 우혜미
- RR: U Hyemi
- MR: U Hyemi

Woo Hye-mi (Korean: 우혜미; April 6, 1988 – September 21, 2019), also known by her stage name Miwoo (미우), was a South Korean singer. She was known for being one of the final four contestants on the first season of the talent show The Voice of Korea in 2012.

On September 21, 2019, Woo was found dead in her home.

== Discography ==
=== Extended plays ===
Title	Album details	Peak chart positions	Sales
Title	Album details	KOR	Sales
s.s.t	Released: August 19, 2019; Label: Downtown E&M; Formats: CD, digital download	—	—N/a
"—" denotes release did not chart.

=== Singles ===
Title	Year	Peak chart positions	Sales	Album
Title	Year	KOR	Sales	Album
As lead artist
"Stand Up for You" with Son Seung-yeon, U Sung-eun, Ji Se-hui	2012	94	KOR: 35,209	The Voices
"Broken Doll" (못난이 인형)	2015	—	—N/a	Non-album singles
"Egg" feat. Nucksal	2017	—	—N/a	Non-album singles
"Rotten Flower" (꽃도 썩는다)	2019	—	—N/a	s.s.t
"s.s.t (sweet short time)"	2019	—	—N/a	s.s.t
As featured artist
"Kaleidoscope" (주마등) Leessang feat. Miwoo	2015	3	KOR: 423,189	Non-album single
"Get Some Air" (바람이나 좀 쐐) Gary feat. Miwoo	2015	1	KOR: 1,002,316	2002
"Tantara" (딴따라) Gary feat. Miwoo	2016	—	—N/a	Non-album single from Entertainer soundtrack
"—" denotes release did not chart.

== Filmography ==
Date	Title	Role	Network
2012	The Voice of Korea	Herself	Mnet
