= Haha =

Haha or ha ha or HA HA is an onomatopoeic representation of laughter.

Haha and variants may also refer to:

== People ==
- Ha Ha Clinton-Dix (born 1992), American football player
- Haha (entertainer) (born 1979), Entertainer
- Regan Tamanui, Australian artist who uses the tag name HA-HA

== Places ==
- Saint-Louis-du-Ha! Ha!
- Ha! Ha! River (Gros-Mécatina), Côte-Nord, Quebec, Canada
- Ha! Ha! River (Saguenay River), Saguenay, Quebec, Canada
- Lake Ha! Ha!, a lake in Canada
- Ha Ha Bay, a bay on the island of Newfoundland, Canada
  - Raleigh, Newfoundland and Labrador, Canada, a town originally known as Ha Ha Bay after the above
- Haha-jima, an island of Japan

== Other uses ==
- Ha-ha, a recessed landscape barrier
- Haha (tribe), a Moroccan Berber ethnic group
- "(Ha Ha) Slow Down", a song by Fat Joe, 2010
- "Haha", a song by Asteria and Lytra; has a remix with Kets4eki and Vyzer
- Mother (1963 film) or Haha, a Japanese film
- Hāhā, several species of Hawaiian plants, including those of the genus Cyanea
- "Ha ha!", a catchphrase used by character Nelson Muntz on the television series The Simpsons
- ''Ha Ha", a catchphrase of the character Jailor in the 1975 Indian film Sholay

== See also ==
- Ha Ha Ha (disambiguation)
- Ho ho ho (disambiguation)
- Lord Haw-Haw, the nickname of several announcers on the English language propaganda radio programme Germany Calling, broadcast by Nazi Germany
- HAHAHAHAHA, a 2020 Chinese reality series
