= Hoohoo =

Hoohoo, Hoo Hoo or Hoo-Hoo may refer to:

- Alexandria Hoo Hoos, a baseball team in Alexandria, Louisiana
- Orange Hoo–Hoos, a baseball team in Orange, Texas
- Concatenated Order of Hoo-Hoo, a fraternal and service organization
  - Hoo-Hoo Monument, in Gurdon, Arkansas
- Hoohoo, West Virginia, an unincorporated community
- Hoo-Hoo Archives, alias of buZ blurr
