= Haha ha =

South Korean YouTuber

YouTube information
- Channel: Haha ha
- Years active: 2015–present
- Genre: Animals
- Subscribers: 1.25 million
- Views: 545 million
- Last updated: March 2025

Haha ha (Korean: 하하하), stylized as haha ha, is a South Korean YouTuber. He primarily produces videos about the cats and dogs that live on his fish farm in rural South Korea. He started the YouTube channel in 2015, and had over a million subscribers by 2021. He adopted a number of stray cats that feature in his videos. Over time, he noticed that the stray cats would disappear or become unhealthy. He began to keep several of them in an enclosure to keep them safe.

He has named the cats; most of the names describe the cats in the Korean language, for example: Samsaek (literally "three-toned"), Ddungddang ("chubby"), Gilmak ("road-blocker"), Yattong (figuratively, "meows a lot"), and others.
