= Gill (musician) =

South Korean singer and television personality

Gil Seong-joon
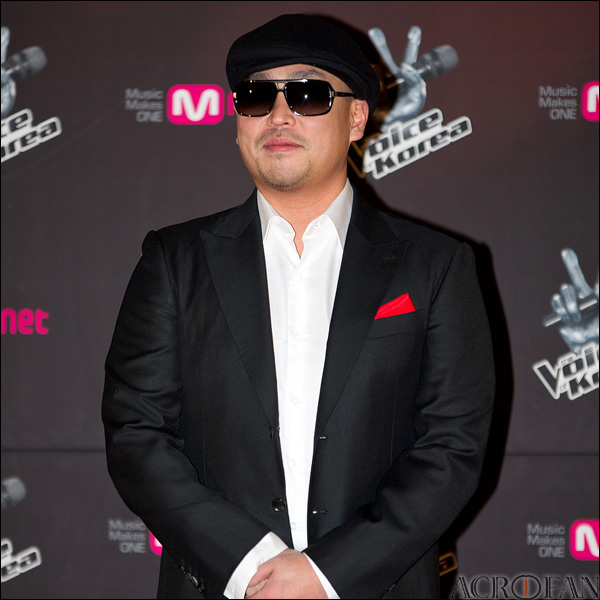

Background information
- Born: Gil Seong-joon; December 24, 1977 (age 48); Seoul, South Korea
- Genres: Hip hop; soul; R&B
- Occupations: comedian, music producer, Judge
- Instrument: Piano
- Years active: 1997–present
- Labels: Jungle Entertainment; Leessang Company; Magic Mansion

Korean name
- Hangul: 길성준
- Hanja: 吉成俊
- RR: Gil Seongjun
- MR: Kil Sŏngjun

Gil Seong-joon (Korean: 길성준; born December 24, 1977), better known by his stage name Gill (길), is a South Korean singer and television personality. He was the main singer of former South Korean hip-hop duo, Leessang.

In 2009, Gil joined Infinite Challenge as a guest and, later on, as a regular co-host. Gil also co-hosted Come To Play. In 2012, Gil joined Voice of Korea as one of the coaches and continued for Season 2. He was caught by police for DUI incident in April 2014 and eventually resigned from any public activity including Infinite Challenge and made the comeback in TV program as a producer for Mnet's hip-hop survival program, Show Me The Money 5, in 2016.

== Personal life ==
Gil said that when he was 5 years old, his father fainted, causing him to be disabled. To cure him, they put their house on auction. Gil's father was immobile for about a decade before he started to talk and walk again.

== Career ==
=== Infinite Challenge (2009–2014) ===
Gil made his first appearance on an episode which featured Korean figure skater Kim Yuna in April 2009, ostensibly substituting for Jeong Jun-ha, who had to leave the episode recording early. He remained a de facto member of Infinite Challenge until he became a full member later that year. During the Boxing episodes in January 2010, Gil showed off his 9-year-long training in the sport. Gil is often called the Unfunny Friend due to his inability to ad-lib as quickly as the other co-hosts.

In 2012, both of Leesang members, Gil and Gary, who worked as the main concert organizer of Infinite Challenge: Super 7 concert announced their departure from their respective variety shows, because of high ticket price protests. The concert itself eventually canceled. On the other hand, they still continued their participation as variety show cast after the controversy calmed down.

=== The Voice of Korea (2013-2014) ===
Gill participated as a coach on inaugural season of The Voice of Korea.

=== Hiatus (2014) ===
After the DUI incident, he took a hiatus from any public activities including TV appearances and concerts.

=== Show Me The Money (2016) ===
Gill joined MNET's fifth season of the TV rap competition Show Me the Money in 2016 as one of the producers with Mad Clown as Team Gill & Mad Clown.

== Discography ==
=== EP ===
- R.O.A.D. Project #1 (2015)

=== Singles ===
- "Refrigerator" (냉장고) with Verbal Jint & Lee Hi (May 28, 2016)

== Variety shows ==
| Year | Title | Role |
|---|---|---|
| 2008 | Kko Kko Tour (Season 1) | |
| 2008 | Kko Kko Tour (Season 2) | |
| 2009–2014 | Infinite Challenge | Co-MC |
| 2016 | Show Me The Money 5 | Producer (teamed up with Mad Clown) |

== Awards ==
| Year | Award | Category | Result |
|---|---|---|---|
| 2009 | Mnet 20's Choice | Hot Variety Star | Won |
| 2009 | MBC Entertainment Awards | Newcomer - Men's Division | Won |
| 2009 | MBC Entertainment Awards | Best Male Variety Daesang with Infinite Challenge member | Won |
| 2010 | 10th MBC Entertainment Awards | Award For Best TV Programme of the Year (TEO PD with entire directing members of Infinite Challenge) | Won |
| 2010 | 22nd Korean Producers Grandprix | Award For Best TV Entertainment Programme (Co winner, with entire directing members of Infinite Challenge) | Won |
| 2013 | 13th MBC Entertainment Awards | Most Popular Program (with Infinite Challenge members) | Won |
