= Hoohoo, West Virginia =

Hoohoo
- Unincorporated community
- Location within the state of West Virginia Hoohoo (the United States)
- Coordinates: 37°44′34″N 81°18′35″W
- Country: United States
- State: West Virginia
- County: Raleigh
- Elevation: 2,034 ft (620 m)
- Time zone: UTC-5 (Eastern (EST))
  - Summer (DST): UTC-4 (EDT)
- GNIS ID: 1554734

Hoohoo is an unincorporated community located in Raleigh County, West Virginia, United States.

Hoohoo has been noted for its unusual place name.
