= U Sung-eun =

South Korean singer (born 1989)

- 유성은
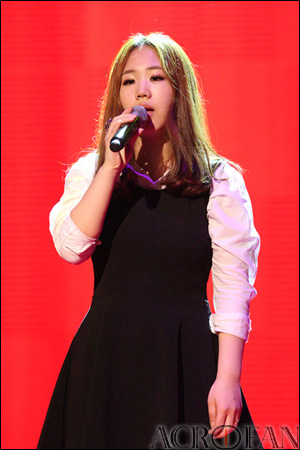
- U Sung-eun in April 2012
- Born: Yoo Sung-eun; April 26, 1989 (age 36); South Korea
- Occupation: Singer
- Spouse: Louie (m. 2021)
- Musical career
- Genres: K-pop; R&B; ballad
- Instrument: Vocals
- Years active: 2012–present
- Label: Music Works
- Website: themusicworks.co.kr/usungeun/introduce/

- U Sung-eun
- Hangul: 유성은
- RR: Yu Seongeun
- MR: Yu Sŏngŭn

Yoo Sung-eun (Korean: 유성은, born April 26, 1989), stylized as U Sung-eun, is a South Korean singer. She was the runner-up of the first season of The Voice of Korea. She released her debut album, Be OK, on July 15, 2013.

== Personal life ==
Yoo married rapper Louie of Geeks on July 11, 2021.

== Discography ==
=== Extended plays ===
Title	Album details	Peak chart positions	Sales
Title	Album details	KOR	Sales
Be OK	Released: July 15, 2013; Label: The Music Works, CJ E&M; Formats: CD, digital download	55	—N/a
2nd Mini Album	Released: October 12, 2015; Label: The Music Works, CJ E&M; Formats: CD, digital download	54	—N/a

=== Singles ===
Title	Year	Peak chart positions	Sales	Album
Title	Year	KOR	Sales	Album
"Be OK" (feat. Baechigi)	2013	4	KOR: 803,950	Be OK
"Healing"	2013	19	KOR: 189,627	Non-album singles
"Have To Hurt Once Anyway" (어차피 한번은 아파야 해)	2015	22	KOR: 78,201	Non-album singles
"Marihuana" (마리화나)	2015	73	KOR: 31,066	Non-album singles
"Nothing" (feat. Mamamoo's Moonbyul)	2015	16	KOR: 128,199	2nd Mini Album
"Jealousy" (질투) (feat. Kisum)	2016	34	KOR: 99,695	Non-album singles
"Hug Me"(끌어안아줘) (feat. BTOB's Ilhoon)	2018	—	—N/a	Non-album singles
"Deep"	2019	—	—N/a	Departure
"Runaway" (도망가요)	2020	—	—N/a	Non-album singles
"Right On Time" (야 놀자)	2020	—	—N/a	Non-album singles
"I'll Listen" (들어줄게요)	2021	—	—N/a	Non-album singles

=== Collaborations ===
Title	Year	Peak chart positions	Sales	Album
Title	Year	KOR	Sales	Album
"Love Virus" (사랑병) with BtoB	2012	74	KOR: 87,146	Non-album singles
"Don't Hurt" (아프지마) with Yongjin	2013	—	KOR: 30,014	Non-album singles
"500 Days Of Summer" (500일의 Summer) with Rooftop House Studio	2016	—	—N/a	Non-album singles
"Winter of Dreams" (한 겨울날의 꿈) with Chonamzone	2021	—	—N/a	Non-album singles
"We Between Spring" (봄 사이, 우리) with Lee seung woo, Prod. by Park Keun-tae	2021	—	—N/a	Non-album singles

=== Soundtrack appearances ===
Title	Year	Peak chart positions	Sales	Album
Title	Year	KOR	Sales	Album
"Lose One's Way" (잠시 길을 잃다)	2012	69	KOR: 48,274	The Voice of Korea
"Binari" (비나리)	2012	53	KOR: 57,839	The Voice of Korea
"Just A Feeling"	2012	—	KOR: 32,217	The Voice of Korea
"Game Over"	2012	—	—N/a	The Voice of Korea
"Woman Outside The Window" (창밖의 여자)	2012	—	—N/a	The Voice of Korea
"Stand Up For You" with Son Seung-yeon, Woo Hye-mi, Ji Se-hee	2012	94	KOR: 35,209	The Voice of Korea
"Candy Kiss" (사탕키스)	2012	—	—N/a	Childless Comfort OST
"Because Love Grows" (사랑이 자라서)	2013	20	KOR: 119,455	Who Are You? OST
"Twilight"	2013	75	KOR: 30,458	The Suspicious Housekeeper OST
"Soup" (사모곡)	2013	—	—N/a	Immortal Songs: Singing the Legend
"Beautiful Days" (아름다운 시절)	2014	—	KOR: 17,208	Wonderful Days OST
"I Really Love You" (정말 사랑합니다) with GB9	2014	—	KOR: 19,168	Cunning Single Lady OST
"Trap" with Swings	2014	27	KOR: 91,161	My Secret Hotel OST
"Jasmine Flower" (말리꽃)	2015	19	KOR: 112,888	Persevere, Goo Hae-ra OST
"I Love You" (널 사랑해)	2015	63	KOR: 19,759	Persevere, Goo Hae-ra OST
"A Short Wait" (작은 기다림) with Jung Jin-young	2015	—	—N/a	Persevere, Goo Hae-ra OST
"I'm in Love" with Jung Jin-young	2015	71	KOR: 18,867	Persevere, Goo Hae-ra OST
"Do You Know" (아시나요) with Kwak Si-yang	2015	—	—N/a	Persevere, Goo Hae-ra OST
"Maybe" (그랬나봐) with Ulala Session	2015	63	KOR:22,883	Persevere, Goo Hae-ra OST
"She is Smiling" (그녀가 웃잖아) with Jung Jin-young, Min Hyo-rin, Ulala Session	2015	—	—N/a	Persevere, Goo Hae-ra OST
"Love+" (사랑+) with Henry	2015	—	—N/a	Persevere, Goo Hae-ra OST
"Oh You Yeah You" (오유야유)	2015	—	KOR: 15,667	Second 20s OST
"Beautiful Truth" (아름다운 사실)	2015	—	—N/a	Immortal Songs: Singing the Legend
"Many Many" (많이많이) with Truedy	2016	—	—N/a	Two Yoo Project Sugar Man OST
"Four Beats" (네 박자)	2016	—	—N/a	Immortal Songs: Singing the Legend
"Look at Me" (바라봐) with Na Yoon-kwon, Nine9, Linus's Blanket, Son Seung-yeon	2016	—	—N/a	Melody To Masterpiece OST
"High School Reunion" (고등학교 동창회) with Hong Dae-kwang	2016	—	—N/a	Melody To Masterpiece OST
"Congratulations" (축하해요) with Jhameel, Hong Dae-kwang	2016	—	—N/a	Melody To Masterpiece OST
"By My Side" (내 곁에)	2016	—	—N/a	Melody To Masterpiece OST
"Sometimes" (아주 가끔)	2016	88	KOR: 19,600	The K2 OST
"Home" (집으로) with Im Se-jun, Park Bo-ram, Suran	2016	—	—N/a	Melody To Masterpiece OST
"Confession" (참회록)	2016	—	—N/a	Melody To Masterpiece OST
"I Love You, Be Happy" (사랑해 행복해) with KMS, Suran	2016	—	—N/a	Melody To Masterpiece OST
"A Glass Of Soju" (소주 한잔) feat. Choi Seong-guk	2016	—	—N/a	Singderella
"My Heart Hurts" (마음이 아파도)	2016	—	—N/a	Sing For You OST
"You"	2016	—	—N/a	My Fair Lady OST
"About Romance" (낭만에 대하여)	2017	—	—N/a	King of Mask Singer
"You Are Like a Flower" (그대 꽃)	2017	—	—N/a	The Rebel OST
"Waves" (파도) with Kisum	2017	—	—N/a	Immortal Songs: Singing the Legend
"This Heart Back Here" (이 마음 다시 여기에)	2017	—	—N/a	Immortal Songs: Singing the Legend
"You Can Feel It"	2017	—	—N/a	Idol Drama Operation Team OST
"Come Back" (돌아와) with Kisum	2017	—	—N/a	Immortal Songs: Singing the Legend
"Hidden Tears" (가려진 눈물)	2017	—	—N/a	The Emperor: Owner of the Mask OST
"The Moonlight Night in Shilla" (신라의 달밤) with Bonggu	2017	—	—N/a	Immortal Songs: Singing the Legend
"Hong Kong Lady" (홍콩 아가씨) with Bonggu	2017	—	—N/a	Immortal Songs: Singing the Legend
"Fall in Love"	2017	—	—N/a	Two Cops OST
"Unrequited Love" (짝사랑)	2018	—	—N/a	Immortal Songs: Singing the Legend
"Hello"	2018	—	—N/a	Familiar Wife OST
"Star (Little Prince)" (별 (Little Prince)) with Loco	2018	—	—N/a	Memories of the Alhambra OST
" Attention (New Acappella) (Prod. by Yoon Sang)" (사모곡) with Maytree, The Barberettes, Wing	2019	—	—N/a	Vocal Play Vol.5-CHEMISTRY
"The Pierrot Laughs at Us" (삐에로는 우릴 보고 웃지 (Live)) with Kwon Min-je	2019	—	—N/a	2019 KSMF LIVE
"Tears" (눈물)	2019	—	—N/a	MBC `Will you be #1 now?` Part.1
"Disturbance" (파란) with Giant Pink	2019	—	—N/a	Immortal Songs: Singing the Legend
"About Romance" (낭만에 대하여)	2020	—	—N/a	Romantic Call Centre PART18
"My Story" (내 얘기를 들어줘)	2020	—	—N/a	Do Do Sol Sol La La Sol OST
"Like an Indian Doll" (인디안 인형처럼)	2020	—	—N/a	Lotto Singer Episode 9
"I Live in Your Eyes" (너의 눈에 내가 살아)	2021	—	—N/a	She Would Never Know OST
"I, actually" (사실)	2021	—	—N/a	The Sweet Blood X U SUNG EUN
"I Wish My Heart Would Reach You" (내 마음이 너에게 닿았으면)	2021	—	—N/a	Oh My Ladylord OST
"—" denotes releases that did not chart.
