= HAHAHAHAHA =

Chinese television series

- 哈哈哈哈哈 (5哈)
- Genre: Tourism variety show
- Starring: Deng Chao; Chen He; Fan Zhiyi; Wang Mian Former Members: Luhan; Peng Yuchang; Dong Bao Shi
- Country of origin: China
- Original language: Chinese
- No. of seasons: 5

Production
- Producer: Cheyunyun、Lixiao、Chenluozhou
- Production location: China
- Editor: Daqian Pictures
- Production companies: iQiyi; Tencent Video; Blue Sky Media; Orange reflection Hexin Media

Original release
- Network: iQiyi; Tencent Video; Dragon TV

Hahahahaha (Chinese: 哈哈哈哈哈, also known as 5哈) is a road-style outdoor reality show that began production by iQiyi and Tencent Video in 2020, and is jointly produced by Blue Sky Media, Orange Image, and Hexin Media. It is also the first outdoor reality show variety show launched by the dual platforms of iQiyi and Tencent Video using the "joint production, joint production, joint solo broadcast, and rotating investment promotion" model.

== Season 1 ==
=== Broadcast time ===
頻道	Broadcast country	Broadcast date	Broadcast time	
IQIYI	China	6 November 2020	Every Friday at 8:00 p.m	
Tencent VideoTencent Video	China	6 November 2020	Every Friday at 8:00 p.m	
Dragon TV	China	7 November 2020	Every Saturday night at 10:00	
WeTV	Taiwan	6 November 2020	Every Friday at 8:00 p.m	
iIqiyChannel	Malaysia	8 November 2020	Every Sunday at 8:00 p.m	
From 27 November 2020, iQiyi and Tencent video members will be the first to watch for 8 hours, that is, every Friday 12:00 members, every Friday 20:00 transfer free
愛奇藝、騰訊視頻	China	27 November 2020	VIP	Every Friday at 12:00 noon
愛奇藝、騰訊視頻	China	27 November 2020	Ordinary user	Every Friday night at 20:00
2020年12月4日起東方衛視每週四22:00重播
東方衛視	China	4 December 2020	Every Thursday night at 22:00	

Wang Chenyi, Tian Yu first in the small Three River yacht for tourists to take photos to make money, Deng Chao sold Baidi city tickets, Chen Ming as a broadcaster, Chen He and Zhang Yujian also help tourists to take photos, Lu Han and Deng Ziqi sold mascot dolls, Zhang Yanqi and Wang Chenyi returned to sell photos before the purchase of jewelry in Yiwu. After achieving today's performance, the members boarded the deck and performed a square dance performance with the passengers, and held a street performance on board the ship when the Bai Di City was suspended.

=== Program song ===
This period of five Ha tour group came to Gansu Lanzhou Argan town. Lei Jiayin, Dong Zijian and Yu Shuxin joined the tour group.

=== Travel rules ===
Wonderful travel signing book
1.	The tour is part time and part time, and the visitors will earn money for the trip through their own labor
2.	Travel agencies collect fees from travelers by contract
3.	In the itinerary, passengers should hand over their personal documents and all luggage to the travel agency, according to the travel agency route, and can not leave the group without authorization
4.	Passengers will not be able to earn money by scanning their faces, and a fee will be deducted if they are called by a passerby's name
5.	The tour guide can earn a reasonable fee from the passengers by his own efforts

=== Member introduction ===
5HA Tour group
Name	Birthday	Number of participating phases	Remark
Tour guide
Wang Mian (Xiao Wang)	7 May 1994	Issues 0–12	
president
Wang Zhengyu (Lao Wang)	—	Issues 0–12	General producer
The first generation to join the league
Deng Chao	8 February 1979	Issues 0–12	
Chen He	9 November 1985	Issues 0–12	
Luhan	20 April 1990	Issues 0–12	
The second generation joined the league
R1SE- Zhang Yanqi	2 July 1998	Issues 2–11	
Wang Chenyi	22 September 1998	Issues 2–11	
Occasional participation
Tianyu	21 December 1975	Issues 2–7, 11–12	
Special invitation to join the group
Huang Bo	26 August 1974	Issues 1–2	
Taohong	15 January 1972	Issues4-5	
Pass by
Zhang Xinyi	29 May 1981	lssues5	
Be forced to join the league
Chen Ming	7 April 1988	Issues 5–8, 11–12	
Lurk in the regiment
Deng Ziqi	16 August 1991	Issues 6–8	
Unknown??
Zhang Yujian	9 February 1990	Issues 6–7	
Looking for a friend
R1SE- Zhou Zhennan	21 June 2000	Issues 8–9	
Join the regiment in disguise
Liang Chao	3 March 1978	Issues 8–9	
Half-way bunching
THE9- Yu Shuxin	18 December 1995	Phase 10	A Writer's Odysseycrew
Lei Jiayin	29 August 1983	Phase 10	A Writer's Odysseycrew
Dong Zijian	19 December 1993	Phase 10	A Writer's Odysseycrew
Emergency rescue
THE9- Kong Cher	30 April 1996	Issues 10–11	
Talent into the group
Focus	8 December 1996	Issue 11	
Join the group with a song
Musicians from Lanzhou	—	Issue 11	

=== Episodes (Season 1) ===
==== Issue 4:20201204 ====
Chongqing Night:

The next day, Deng Chao, Lu Han and Wang Chenyi went to the wedding site with Chen Ming to send blessings to the couple.

As the group boarded the train to Darassa, the directors announced today's rules. There would be 25 hours before they arrived, and the group would have to win a cushioned ticket through a series of mini-games.

The daily fee for the program group is 200 yuan, and the opportunity to make money can only be through part-time work.

After arriving at the destination Lhasa, the group visited the Potala Palace with the Tibetan guide and had a special lunch at the restaurant. After dinner, we visited the Yarlung Zangbo River, the Goat Lake and other scenic spots. Tian Yu was absent from the trip to the Sheep Lake because he was not feeling well.

As the group boarded the train to Darassa, the directors announced today's rules. There would be 25 hours before they arrived, and the group would have to win a cushioned ticket through a series of mini-games.

第一天資金結算
DengChao		LuHan		ChenHe	WangMian
Capital 124 yuan		Fund 39 yuan		Capital 88 yuan	
Peanut x1	8yuan	Toilet door x1	5yuan	Zero consumption	N/A
Open the refrigerator x1	5yuan	Paper towel x1	5yuan	Zero consumption	N/A
Beer x4	80yuan	Comb Mirror set x1	1yuan	Zero consumption	N/A
Face mask x3	3yuan			Zero consumption	N/A
Toothbrush x3	10yuan			Zero consumption	N/A
Towel x1	10yuan			Zero consumption	N/A
Dessert x1	10yuan			Zero consumption	N/A
Room x1	50yuan			Zero consumption	N/A
Aggregate consumption 176 yuan		Aggregate consumption 11 yuan		Aggregate consumption 0 yuan	income Ten yuan

==== The fifth issue 20201211 ====
- Main contents:

Finally, the members used mobile phones to connect with all the people who had appeared in the past, recalling how hard and difficult it was to experience a different life at that time, and ushered in the end of the program.

Each person has a work card, and to Zhoushan to look for work, after earning money, must be handed over to their respective director, each income 200 can start.

After arriving at the destination Lhasa, the group visited the Potala Palace with the Tibetan guide and had a special lunch at the restaurant. After dinner, we visited the Yarlung Zangbo River, the Goat Lake and other scenic spots. Tian Yu was absent from the trip to the Sheep Lake because he was not feeling well.

After arriving at the destination Lhasa, the group visited the Potala Palace with the Tibetan guide and had a special lunch at the restaurant. After dinner, we visited the Yarlung Zangbo River, the Goat Lake and other scenic spots. Tian Yu was absent from the trip to the Sheep Lake because he was not feeling well.

Finally, the members used mobile phones to connect with all the people who had appeared in the past, recalling how hard and difficult it was to experience a different life at that time, and ushered in the end of the program.

In this period, the five Ha tour group came to the Yangtze River Gold No. 6 cruise, and G.E. Ziqi, Zhang Yujian rendezvous, began today's journey, the program group announced that each person needs to work to earn at least 100 yuan.

==== Issue 12:20210129 ====
- Main contents:

This 5HA tour group came to Hengdian World Studios to participate in the "play fine Conference" imitation competition.

After the trip to Jiangxi, Tao Hong left first, and the rest of the members went to Wuhan, and had a midnight snack with her friend Zhang Xinyi from Wuhan.

This period of five Ha tour group came to Chongqing Zhongxian camping, on the way members Zhou Zhennan, Liang Chao joined this trip, G.E. Ziqi left first for work reasons.

The next morning, the group played a basketball game with local residents. After the game, Chen Ming left the group due to business, and the tour group drove to downtown Chongqing. Upon arrival, the director released the first task, which required the members to send a circle of friends to let friends decide what ingredients to order for dinner hot pot. The next day, the director released the second task, need to find the good memories of Chongqing and take photos, in order to get the next phase of the props.

==== The sixth issue 20201218 ====
- Main contents：

This five Ha tour group came to Chongqing, the director group released the first task Chongqing night, the director group will issue each person a task card, and complete the task, each person needs to make 200 travel fees.

In this period, the five Ha tour group came to the Yangtze River Gold No. 6 cruise, and G.E. Ziqi, Zhang Yujian rendezvous, began today's journey, the program group announced that each person needs to work to earn at least 100 yuan.

If you are assassinated, you need to go to the photo studio and eat half a kiwi fruit in order to revive successfully and continue the game.

Finally, the members used mobile phones to connect with all the people who had appeared in the past, recalling how hard and difficult it was to experience a different life at that time, and ushered in the end of the program.

The other is a "Tencent Universal Card", with which the person who transfers to this card can redeem a universal avatar (which can replace any identity) at 98 Middle Street, Akang Town.

Member Tian Yu showed the simplicity and enthusiasm of Li Bai's history to the audience, showing the vibrant state of cultural tourism in the gradual recovery of the epidemic.

- Main contents：
1. Eat well: Chen He, Lu Han, Zhang Yanqi, Tian Yu, Wang Chenyi Well done: Deng Chao

After arriving at the venue, the director team released today's task "Assassin hero", everyone has their own initial ranking and identity, need to earn a certain amount of money and reach the egg machine to take other people's identity clues, as long as you turn to other people's identity clues, you can get a clue of other people's identity, if you get two clues, The target of the clue can be analyzed and the villager can be found in the local place and taken to the photo studio, that is, the assassination is successful, and the last three members of the ranking will live in the local countryside.

==== The seventh issue 20201225 ====
- Main contents：

This 5HA tour group came to Yiwu to start a new day of travel.

The end of the game, Yu Shuxin, Wang Chenyi, Deng Chao three people should stay in the local countryside, but Kong Cher came to take three people to Lanzhou B&B.

This five Ha tour group came to Lanzhou. The previous guests Lei Jiayin, Dong Zijian, Yu Shuxin left the group, and Kong Cher stayed.

This period of five Ha tour group came to Zhongxian County, to participate in the loyalty cup e-sports competition, the host for Chen Ming, Wei Wei.

Tour members need to obtain travel funds at different prices by answering questions, while tour guides can only earn commissions through VIpshop after purchasing goods at a low price and reselling them at a high price. Deng Chao gets a total of 300 travel fees for choosing B, Chen He gets 88 travel fees for choosing C, and Lu Han gets 50 travel fees for choosing E.

=== Issue 8:20210101 ===
- Main contents:

This period of five Ha tour group came to Chongqing Zhongxian camping, on the way members Zhou Zhennan, Liang Chao joined this trip, G.E. Ziqi left first for work reasons.

Then the director team took everyone to the hot pot restaurant, and released the second task of the tacit understanding of the hot pot test, the number of orders for the odd number of dishes, even number is cancelled. After dinner, Zhou Zhennan and Liang Chao left the group.

Deng Chao and Huang Bo chose to participate in the imitation show conference today, and played Michael Jack Chao and Michael Jack Bo respectively; Chen He, Lu Han work today to choose the crew work; Zhang Yanqi, Wang Chenyi today work choose to participate in the play fine conference, and respectively play GAI Zhou Yan, Aaron Kwok's version of Michael Jackson.

The purchase coupons in the hands of the members can be used as the purchase fund, and the goods will be purchased within 90 minutes. After the purchase, the goods will be compared with the goods. The party who bids higher for the same kind of goods can eat the similar goods of the other party.

After completing the task, each person will pay 200 yuan to the director group, a total of 1200 yuan (excluding two guests).

==== Issue 9:20210108 ====
- Main contents：

After completing the task, each person will pay 200 yuan to the director group, a total of 1200 yuan (excluding two guests).

Note: Dragon TV purchased the broadcast rights of this season's programs, and some content was deleted, which also became the "exclusive TV broadcast platform" of this season.。

League member Deng Chao chose to work in a light bulb factory, learning the production process of light bulbs from workers, and realized the hard work of front-line workers, and went to the barber shop to help guests wash their hair after completion; Tian Yu, a member of the group, chose to exchange her porcelain knowledge with the owner of Yuyao Villa. In the process, she not only helped to select porcelain that could be restored, but also gained cultural knowledge related to porcelain for the audience. Members Tao Hong, Zhang Yanqi and Wang Chenyi chose to go to the film crew to shoot; Member Chen He, Lu Han chose to work as a sculpture model. After they finish their work, they meet at the filming location of the crew.

==== Issue 10:20210115 ====
- Main contents:

Deng Chao took the members to the roller skating rink, enjoying the process of skating back to the 1990s. Subsequently, Deng Chao took the members to the art school teacher's residence, and talked about Deng Chao's various experiences, and was also moved by the teacher's "live and learn" spirit. Then, the members came to sell lotus root Cheng grandma booth visit. Finally, the members went to Deng Chao's national primary school to visit and met Tian Yu, who stayed at the previous station to see the porcelain kiln in the morning.

The end of the game, Yu Shuxin, Wang Chenyi, Deng Chao three people should stay in the local countryside, but Kong Cher came to take three people to Lanzhou B&B.

This period of five Ha tour group came to Gansu Lanzhou Argan town. Lei Jiayin, Dong Zijian and Yu Shuxin joined the tour group.

Then the director team took everyone to the hot pot restaurant, and released the second task of the tacit understanding of the hot pot test, the number of orders for the odd number of dishes, even number is cancelled. After dinner, Zhou Zhennan and Liang Chao left the group.

==== 11th issue 20210122 ====
- Main contents:

This period of five Ha tour group came to Chongqing Zhongxian camping, on the way members Zhou Zhennan, Liang Chao joined this trip, G.E. Ziqi left first for work reasons.

Deng Chao chooses to carry crabs and arm wrestle challenges at the dock; Chen He and Huang Bo chose to work in an ice factory; Lu Han, Wang Mian choose to join the tied crab army.

Task item
"Chongqing Road"	Taxi driver	Deng Chao
"Sounds of Chongqing"	Radio station	Chen He
"Chongqing Food"	Delivery man	Lu Han, Zhou Zhennan
"Boxing in Chongqing"	Finger-guessing game	Zhang Yanqi, Liang Chao
"Chongqing's membrane"	lamination	Wang Chenyi
"Qin of Chongqing"	Make a living as a performer	Wang Mian

==== Phase zero (pilot film) 20201106 ====
- Main contents:

After completing the task, each person will pay 200 yuan to the director group, a total of 1200 yuan (excluding two guests).

- Main contents:

Then the director team took everyone to the hot pot restaurant, and released the second task of the tacit understanding of the hot pot test, the number of orders for the odd number of dishes, even number is cancelled. After dinner, Zhou Zhennan and Liang Chao left the group.

==== The first issue 20201113 ====
- Main contents：

The 5-Ha tour group came to Lanzhou. The previous guests Lei Jiayin, Dong Zijian, Yu Shuxin left the group, but Kong Cher stayed.

The end of the game, Yu Shuxin, Wang Chenyi, Deng Chao three people should stay in the local countryside, but Kong Cher came to take three people to Lanzhou B&B.

The other is a "Tencent Universal Card", with which the person who transfers to this card can redeem a universal avatar (which can replace any identity) at 98 Middle Street, Akang Town

The show's artist lineup includes tour guide Wang Mian and members Deng Chao, Chen He and Lu Han.

Game flow
Round 1	Landlord Fighting	Deng Chao, Chen He, Lu Han, Tian Yu, Deng Ziqi, Zhang Yujian
Round 2	League of Legends	Chen He, Zhang Yanqi, Wang Chenyi, Wang Mian, Deng Ziqi
Round 3	CS	Chen He, Lu Han, Zhang Yanqi, Wang Chenyi, Zhang Yujian
Round 4	Take pictures	Deng Chao, Wang Mian, Tian Yu

==== The second issue 20201120 ====
- Main contents：

This five Ha tour group came to Lanzhou. The previous guests Lei Jiayin, Dong Zijian, Yu Shuxin left the group, and Kong Cher stayed.

After a day of hard work, the members went to Nanchang to experience the night culture and promote Nanchang cuisine.

==== The third issue 20201127 ====
- Jingdezhen Project:

While the group members were taking the train to Darassa, the director team announced today's rules. 25 hours would pass before arriving at the location. The group members must win cushioned tickets through a series of mini-games.

On the way, Wang Mian followed two passengers and got off the bus in Delingha. The next day, he visited the passengers' ranch and had lunch together before returning to the team.

After arriving at their destination in Lhasa, the group members visited the Potala Palace with a Tibetan tour guide and enjoyed a special lunch at a restaurant. After the meal, we visited the Brahmaputra River, Yanghu Lake and other scenic spots. Tian Yu was absent from the Yanghu trip due to physical discomfort.

Finally, the members used their mobile phones to connect with all the people who had appeared in the past, recalling how hard and difficult it was to experience different lives at that time, and ushered in the end of the program.

== Season 4 ==
Ep.	Airdate	Title	Guest(s)	Location	Summary
0	March 16, 2024	The 5-Ha Group Gathers at the Opening Ceremony 五哈团集结 启动仪式走起			
1	March 23–24, 2024	The 5-Ha Group Was Chased by Hundreds of People and Have a Dance Battle 五哈团开篇惨遭百人追逐 首届五哈街舞巅峰对决	Anthony Lee (Kinjaz) Liao Bo	Laos	After an opening ceremony at an old auto repair plant, the 5-Ha group take a train to Laos, where they attempt to find their hotel. They later have a dance competition for funds, judged by Anthony Lee from Kinjaz, with Liao Bo announcing.
2	March 30–31, 2024	Cat and Mouse 2.0 Returns With a Hilarious Twist; The Prodigal Brothers Launch a New Payment Method 猫鼠游戏2.0爆笑返场 败家兄弟开启新型支付方式	Li Weijia After Journey Rong Zishan	Laos	The 5-Ha group plays "cat-and-mouse" and welcomes their guests with water guns. They compete to push their shopping bills onto each other, with the winners owing the least going on a cruise, and the losers owing the most visiting a Chinese language school.
3	April 6–7, 2024	Diving Luhan Drinks Coconut Water; Deng Chao is Controlled by Cai Guoqing for 60 Seconds 跳水鹿晗请喝椰子水 邓超被蔡国庆硬控60秒	Li Weijia After Journey Rong Zishan Cai Guoqing	Nong Fa Lake, Laos	The cast dive and play sepak tekraw to compete to see who will go to a six star hotel, and who will go to a "negative six star" hotel.
4	April 13–14, 2024	Luhan Splashes Water on Deng Chao's Head, Deng Chao and Chen He's Serial Farts Make Wang Mian and Old Uncle Leave 鹿晗猛泼邓超泼上头了 邓超陈赫连环屁崩走王勉老舅	Cai Guoqing	Laos	The 5-Ha group must find a way to spend another night in Laos with limited funds.
5	April 20–21, 2024	Deng Chao and Chen He Wear Black Outfits to Tear Off Nametags; Chen He Becomes the New Village Goalkeeper 邓超陈赫穿黑色紧身衣撕名牌 陈赫成村超新晋门神	Hu Yunfeng Xiao Zhanbo Pu Wei Rong Hao	Guizhou, China	The 5-Ha group find teammates and compete in the Guizhou Village Super League.
6	April 27–28, 2024	Deng Chao, Chen He, and Luhan are Desensitized to Surströmming; Wang Mian and Cai Wenjing are Natural Enemies 邓超陈赫鹿晗对鲱鱼罐头脱敏 王勉蔡文静互为天敌	Qu Ying Tong Chenjie Cai Wenjing Vinida Weng Hankiz Omar Chen Zhuoxuan	Dali Dong Village, Guizhou, China	The cast form pairs with the guests, and compete in a fashion show judged by the villagers.
7	May 4–5, 2024	Deng Chao and Chen He Have a Stinky Food Showdown 邓超陈赫吃臭巅峰对决 邓超陈赫吃臭巅峰对决	Liang Long Ma Di After Journey Liu Ximeng	Jinan, China Qingdao, China	The 5-Ha group celebrate Dong Bao Shi's concert with a stinky food competition, and then travel to Qingdao, where they have dinner with his wife, friends, and Chen He's mother.
8	May 11–12, 2024	Deng Chao, Luhan, Old Uncle, and Wang Mian Sing at a KTV; Chen He is a Logical Genius 超鹿晗老舅王勉KTV嗨唱 陈赫就是逻辑天才	No guests	Qingdao, China	The cast competes against the crew in a series of games where they must all give the same answer. The losing team must jump into the sea as punishment.
9	May 18–19, 2024	Luhan and Zhang Yuan are Scared to Death, Deng Chao and Fan Zhiyi Randomly Sing Thai Songs 鹿晗张远勇闯密室被吓飞 邓超范志毅乱唱泰语歌	Zhang Yuan Lu Hu Yi Jianlian Gao Hanyu	Guangdong, China Bangkok, Thailand	After spending a night in a "haunted" hotel, the 5-Ha group travels to Thailand, where they must memorize a song in Thai.
10	May 25–26, 2024	Chen He Grabs Deng Chao's Chest; The 5-Ha Group Throws Luhan a Surprise Birthday Party 陈赫把邓超胸口抓紧了 五哈团为鹿晗惊喜庆生	Yi Jianlian Gao Hanyu	Bangkok, Thailand	The cast and guests compete in a fashion show where they pick clothes for each other, take a Muay Thai class, and celebrate Luhan's birthday.
11	June 1–2, 2024	Deng Chao, Chen He, and Luhan Fight in a Swimming Pool and at Thailand's Songkran Festival; Deng Chao and Luhan are Splashed 邓超陈赫鹿晗泳池大混战 泰国泼水节邓超鹿晗被泼疯了	Yi Jianlian Gao Hanyu Sushar Manaying Mike Angelo	Pattaya, Thailand	Joined by two Thai celebrities, the cast play a version of "Capture the Flag" and celebrate the Water-Sprinkling Festival.
12	June 8–9, 2024	Deng Chao and Chen He Mimic Fireworks With Their Faces; The Chao-He-Lu Water Splashing Battle Ends 邓超陈赫脸放烟花笑疯 收官超赫鹿沙滩泼水大战	Gao Hanyu	Pattaya, Thailand	The 5-Ha cast celebrate the end of the season with a boat cruise and a barbecue on a small island.

== Season 5 ==
Luhan and Dong Bao Shi did not rejoin the cast for Season 5, as both had recently publicly apologized for "inappropriate behavior".
