= Leessang Company =

- Founded: 2012
- Founder: Gary, Gill
- Defunct: March 31, 2019; 7 years ago
- Genre: hip-hop
- Country of origin: South Korea
- Location: Sinsa-dong, Seoul
- Official website: leessangcompany.com

Leessang Company (Korean: 리쌍컴퍼니) was a South Korean hip hop record label and tour promotion company based in Seoul, South Korea. It was founded in 2012 by Gary and Gill.

== Former Artists ==
=== Recording artists ===
Soloists
- Gary (2012-2017)
- Gill (2012-2017)
- Miwoo (2012-2017)

Groups

- Leessang (2012-2017)
