= Crush on You (album) =

Studio album by Crush

Studio album by Crush
- Released: June 5, 2014
- Recorded: July 2012 – April 2014
- Genres: R&B, hip hop
- Length: 41:01
- Language: Korean
- Label: Amoeba Culture
- Producers: Crush; The Platonix; Gray; Jinbo; Primary

Crush chronology
Crush on You (2014)	Interlude (2016)

Singles from Crush on You
- 1. "Sometimes" Released: April 2, 2014; 2. "Hug Me" Released: June 5, 2014

Crush on You is the debut studio album by South Korean singer Crush. It was released on June 5, 2014, by Amoeba Culture and distributed by Genie Music and Stone Music Entertainment. Crush became an underground hip hop artist after graduating from high school and formed ties with fellow musicians. He began releasing singles in 2012 and was signed to record label Amoeba Culture the following year.

Crush took artistic control over Crush on You. As songs were developed for the album, his music saw a shift towards a more R&B sound. He worked with several musicians on the record in terms of guest features and production. He recorded numerous tracks for the album, which were whittled down to form a record revolving around the theme of love and it was completed in April 2014.

After a series of photo and video teasers, Crush on You and its lead single "Hug Me" featuring rapper Gaeko were concurrently released. Crush promoted the song by performing it on music chart programs across various television networks. The album peaked at number six on South Korea's national Gaon Album Chart, shifting over 4,300 units domestically since its release. Crush on You was listed at one of the best albums of the year by various publications and it earned Crush the Best R&B & Soul Album at the 12th Korean Music Awards.

== Background ==
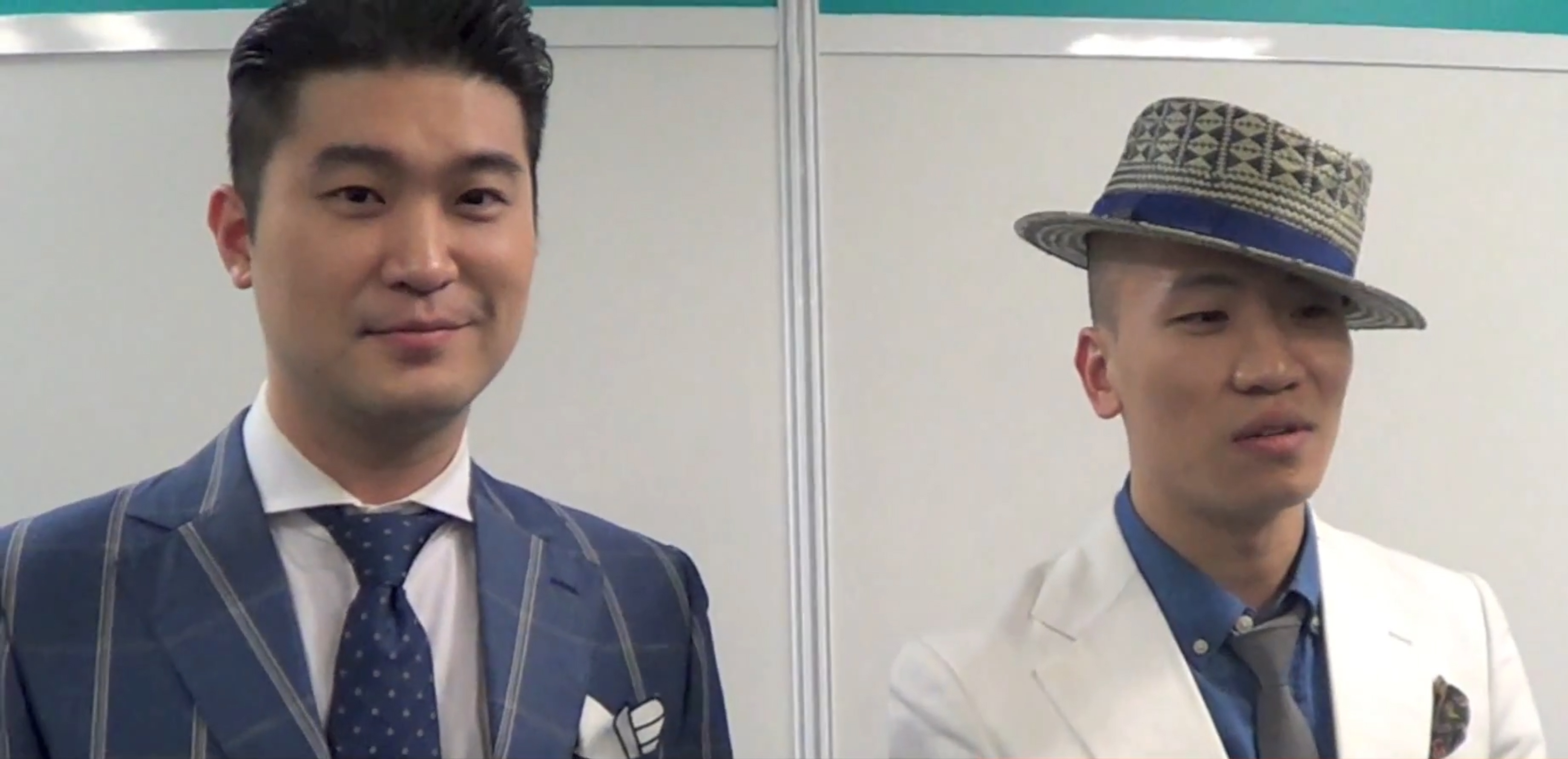
Crush was signed to Dynamic Duo's label Amoeba Culture

Following his graduation from high school, Crush became active in the underground music scene in Hongdae while forming ties with fellow hip hop musicians. He became a member of the music crew VV:D and collaborated with other artists, including Zion.T, Loco, Gary, YDG, Supreme Team, and Dynamic Duo. Beginning in 2012, Crush began releasing a string of singles including "Red Dress" and "Crush on You". In July 2013, he signed an exclusive contract with Dynamic Duo's record label Amoeba Culture.

With hip hop and R&B being a trend at the time, Crush reflected on the previous difficulties of the genres to gain momentum in mainstream music: "Even now, it's not easy, but because the situation is improving, I think there's room for hip hop culture." His focus shifted from hip hop to R&B when he began writing music to better suit his style. While developing his debut album, Crush was in charge of its production, lyrics, composition, and arrangement. He created approximately 30 songs for the project. He deliberated between releasing his music through extended plays and single albums, but decided to conceive Crush on You as a full-length album. He chose the title to match the eponymously titled single as a reflection of his music brand. He specifically organized the style and sequence of each song, and the album was recorded in a span of one year. Crush on You was mastered by Chris Gehringer at Sterling Sound. The cover art evokes a "freeing" atmosphere. In the photo, Crush is surrounded by various objects, including toys, shoes, and magazines.

== Writing and recording ==
In crafting Crush on You, Crush prioritized record production over his vocal abilities as he felt that they were not "as high or as powerful" as Kim Bum-soo's voice. Crush had written a variety of songs, but omitted several tracks to adopt a love theme throughout the album. He put together an array of urban songs with a "sexy feel". "I Fancy You" was recorded in a small room of his parents' house in July 2012. It resulted in the inclusion of background noises, including cicadas. Crush attempted to re-record the song numerous times, but decided that the original gave him the best feeling. "A Little Bit" was initially recorded as a solo piece, but he sensed that it was "kind of dull". Having met Lydia Paek in February 2013 at a Dok2 concert, Crush felt that she was the "best music partner" to match the vibe of the song. The first two tracks of the album were previously performed only at concerts prior to their availability on the album.

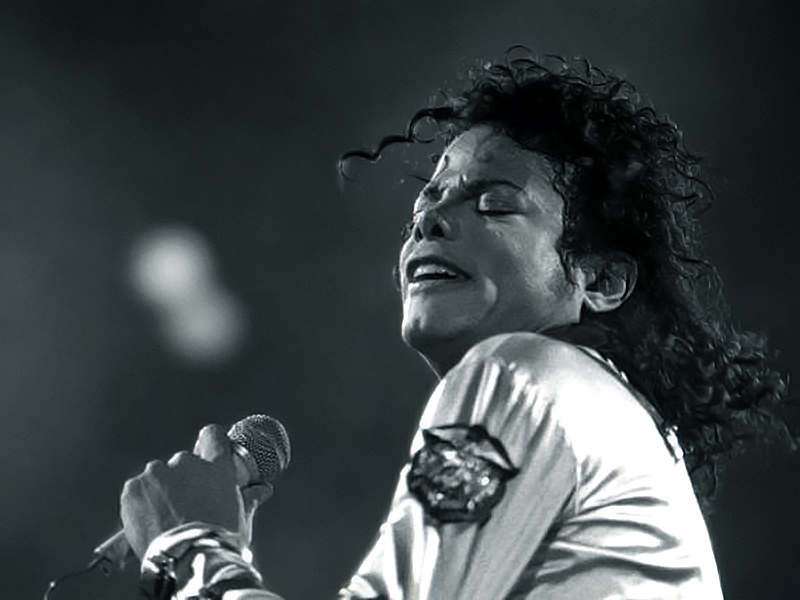
Crush cited Michael Jackson as the musician he wished to emulate

Crush recorded a demo version of "Hey Baby" two years prior to its release. At the time, he had "sketched" the track's melody and lyrics with the intention of including it on Zion.T's album. While deliberating between making a hip hop or disco track, Crush thought of Michael Jackson. In his desire to be a "constantly evolving musician", Crush wanted to become a "leading cultural figure" like Jackson. Feeling Jackson's waning impact in South Korea following his death in 2009 and ahead the posthumous album Xscape (2014), Crush decided to arrange the song as an homage and help facilitate a resurgence in the entertainer's influence. The initials "MJ" are included in the lyrics in his honor.

In the initial version of "I'm Fine", Crush had played a drum loop on a keyboard over the track, but he felt it sounded "rough". He planned to record "I'm Fine" electronically with MIDI, but wanted to give it track a band feel and devoted the song to "the heart and soul". After hearing Kumapark play their song "Donut Shop" at a Dynamic Duo concert, Crush contacted the band to work with them. After finishing the music, Crush recorded the song at Evans Studio. "Give It to Me" is a collaboration with Jay Park and Simon Dominic. Crush highlighted the former as another of his favorite musicians, who postponed his own album to work with Crush.

Before working on his debut record, Crush had asked Jinbo to help on his album. As development of the project progressed, Crush was contacted by Jinbo about a "really good track" he had. They paired up, quickly wrote the lyrics together, and recorded the song. Jinbo, an artist Crush wanted to work with since high school, produced the track in its entirety. "Sometimes" was produced by Amoeba Culture's in-house producer Primary. After grouping ten songs for Crush on You, Crush considered each one to serve as its lead single. As he prepared the album, he collaborated with C-Luv and Gary on the single "Where Do You Wanna Go", where he worked with the engineering duo Stay Tuned. Crush "really liked the song's vibe" and wanted to work with Stay Tuned again. "Hug Me" with Gaeko was completed by winter as the final track recorded for the collection. Crush wanted to promote the track, as he thought it best represented the identity of the album. In a company vote, Amoeba Culture and Crush selected it as the single. "Hug Me" was finished by February 2014 and Crush on You was completed in April.

== Musical style ==
Crush lays his music foundation in black music. Crush on You is an R&B and hip hop record. The album alternates between "sweet melodic" love stories and "bold and provocative" songs. It opens with "I Fancy You", a track with a progressive bouncing rhythm. It is followed by "A Little Bit", a hip-hop and R&B song with guest vocals by Lydia Paek. Crush described it as a 1990s Miami-style song. "Hey Baby" is described as a modern interpretation of new jack swing. Crush beatboxes over the track and it features Zion.T. The album tempo mellows on the ensuing fourth track. "Whatever You Do" is a slow jam that deals with a love story. Kumapark employs a vocoder on "I'm Fine", while Crush performed scat singing on the track. It is followed by "Lovely", which incorporates a band sound in addition to an electric guitar.

Centered around a piano arrangement, "I Want You" sees Crush switch into a rap verse in the middle of the song. "Hug Me" is a hip-hop and R&B song based on the two-step. Featuring Gaeko of Dynamic Duo, it consists of an "intense" beat with a "dynamic groove". In another slow jam, "Give It to Me" sees rap verses by Jay Park and Simon Dominic. The album ends with "Sometimes", a hip-hop and R&B track. The lyrics describe a man missing his lover after a breakup.

== Release and promotion ==
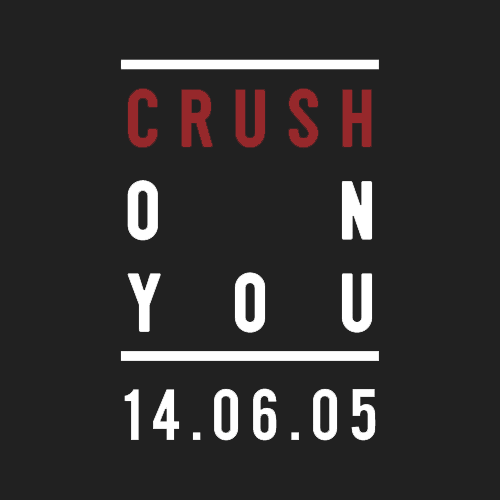
Album title image

In precedence of the album, Crush released "Sometimes" on April 2, 2014. The single debuted and peaked at number eight on South Korea's national Gaon Digital Chart; it ranked within the top 100 for nine consecutive weeks. According to Gaon Music Chart's year-end report, "Sometimes" sold 490,326 music downloads domestically and ranked at number 148 on its list of most-downloaded songs.

On May 23, Crush shared an image which revealed the album title Crush on You and its release date. An image depicting a ten-person silhouette signifying the musicians that participated on the project was unveiled three days later. An album preview video was uploaded two days ahead of its release. Crush on You and the music video for "Hug Me" featuring Gaeko were simultaneously released on June 5. Crush and Gaeko began promoting the lead single on weekly music chart shows on the same day beginning on Mnet's M Countdown. They made additional performances on Seoul Broadcasting System's (SBS) Inkigayo, and Munhwa Broadcasting Corporation's (MBC) Music Core. Crush's decision to include choreography in his performance was met with disapproval due to its awkwardness.

== Critical reception ==
In a review for online magazine IZM, Jeon Min-seok rated Crush on You three and a half out of five stars. He stated that Crush had already demonstrated his vocal skills and abilities to make hooks in his guest features on other songs, and was able to prove his standing in record production on the album. Jeon felt that the compositions were "natural" and shortcomings were filled by the collaborations on the tracks. He praised the song "Hey Baby", which he labeled an "authentic masterpiece". He lamented the thematic similarity between songs, but still suggested that Crush had outshined other R&B acts. In a separate review for the publication, Jung Yu-na described the album as "smooth and consistent", citing Crush's ability to "remain perfect" throughout. Y magazine's Kim Jeong-won complimented Crush for making his own style of music and not falling into Amoeba Culture's "emotional hip hop" rut and was able to shake off the stigma surrounding Korean R&B. Hwang Hyo-jin of Ize magazine described it as an ambitious project where Crush "brought out everything to pique the listener's curiosity" for his first album, but that the result was "definitely not clever".

MBN Star named Crush on You the best album in the first half of the 2014. 10asia magazine listed it as one of the publication's favorite 30 albums at the half-year mark, calling it a "satisfying" record for fans of black music and "party-loving girls". The album also ranked on the same list of the magazine's year-end compilation. It was ranked as one of the top ten best K-pop releases of the year by IZM. Crush on You earned Crush the award for Best R&B & Soul Album at the 12th Korean Music Awards in 2015.

== Commercial performance ==
On the chart dated June 8–14, 2014, Crush on You debuted at number six on South Korea's national Gaon Album Chart. Crush on You ranked within the top 100 for eight non-consecutive weeks. By the end of July, the album shifted 4,313 units domestically.

== Track listing ==
Crush on You
No.	Title	Lyrics	Music	Arrangement	Length
1.	"I Fancy You" (눈이 마주친 순간; Nuni Majuchin Sungan)	Crush	Crush	Crush	3:35
2.	"A Little Bit" (featuring Lydia Paek)	Crush, Lydia Paek	Crush, Lydia Paek	Crush	3:27
3.	"Hey Baby" (featuring Zion.T)	Crush, Zion.T	Crush, Zion.T	Crush	3:54
4.	"Whatever You Do" (featuring Gray)	Crush, Gray	Crush	Crush	3:38
5.	"I'm Fine" (밥맛이야; Bapmasiya) (featuring Kumapark)	Crush	Crush	Kumapark	4:07
6.	"Lovely" (아름다운 그대; Areumdaun Geudae) (featuring Choiza)	The Platonix, Crush, Choiza	The Platonix, Crush	The Platonix	3:35
7.	"I Want You" (원해; Wonhae)	Crush	Crush	Crush	3:34
8.	"Hug Me" (featuring Gaeko)	Crush, Gaeko	Crush, Stay Tuned	Crush, Stay Tuned	3:42
9.	"Give It to Me" (featuring Jay Park and Simon Dominic)	Crush, Jay Park, Simon Dominic	Crush, Gray, Jay Park	Gray	3:55
10.	"Friday ya" (Friday야) (featuring Jinbo)	Crush, Jinbo	Crush, Jinbo	Jinbo	3:11
11.	"Sometimes" (가끔; Gakkeum)	Crush	Crush, Primary, Dibartolo	Primary	4:23
Total length:					41:01

== Chart ==
Chart (2014)	Peak position
South Korean Albums (Gaon)	6

== Release history ==
Region	Date	Format(s)	Label	Ref.
Various	June 5, 2014	Digital download	Amoeba Culture; Genie Music; Stone Music	
South Korea	June 10, 2014	CD	Amoeba Culture; Kakao M	
