= Aeao =

Song by Dynamic Duo

from the album A Giant Step
- Genre: Hip-hop
- Label: Amoeba Culture

Dynamic Duo singles chronology
"Summer Time" (2014)	"Aeao" (2014)	"SsSs" (2014)

"Aeao" (stylized in all caps) is a song by South Korean artists Dynamic Duo and American producer DJ Premier. It was released by Amoeba Culture on the former's 2014 album A Giant Step.

After both artists performed at K-Pop Night Out at MIDEM 2014 in Cannes, France, Dynamic Duo and DJ Premier collaborated and created the song. It was released in a live showcase in Seoul on July 16 with a corresponding music video. The song discusses everyday hardships and the struggles of urban life. Critics highlighted the song as having "insane beats" and a "dramatic melody" while also being catchy. The song became a sleeper hit in 2023 after a surge in usage in short form media, including by other K-pop artists, and was included in the 2023 TikTok South Korean Song of the Summer Top 10. "Aeao" was featured in the video game NBA 2K16, and was included in the game series' soundtrack ten years later.

== Background and composition ==
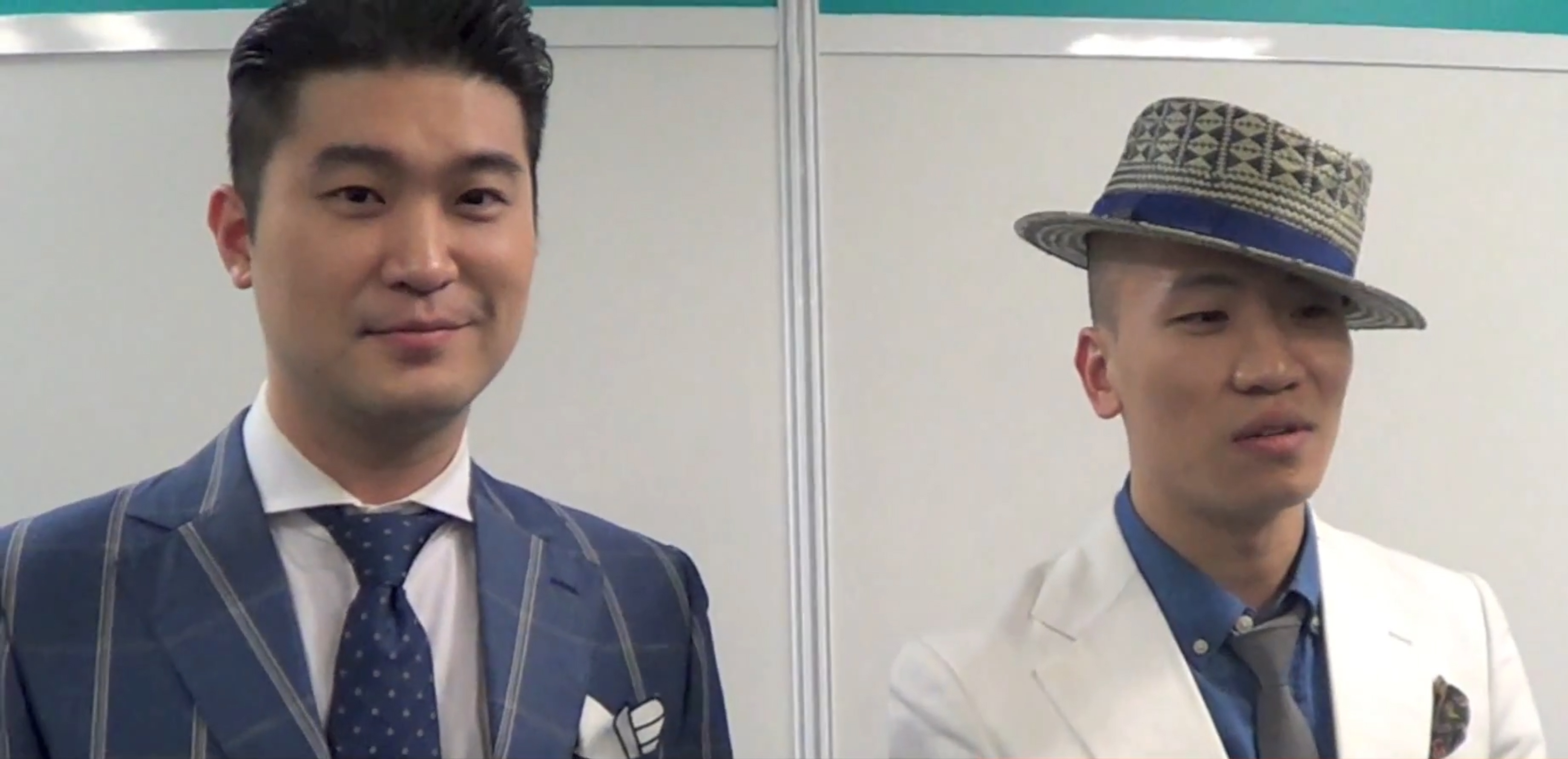
Dynamic Duo at the MIDEM Festival, 2014

In February 2014, Dynamic Duo performed at the annual K-Pop Night Out at MIDEM 2014 in Cannes, France. DJ Premier also participated in the festival, with his manager contacting Amoeba Culture, the label of Dynamic Duo. After testing ideas, both artists collaborated in June and created the album A Giant Step with two songs. Gaeko, in a statement, reminisces about giving "all" of his energy in the song due to it being a "meaningful moment" in his career; he was excited to collaborate with DJ Premier since he had long been inspired by him. The sound "Aeao" was thought out when Gaeko hummed the guide track but could not find the right lyrics, causing him to pick a word listeners would easily sing along to. The song was released on July 16 as part of the album; on its release day, the album had a live showcase in Seoul which was described as "explosive" by Jessica Oak of Billboard.

The song discusses everyday hardships and the struggles of urban life. Representative lines include: "살기보단 생존하기 바쁜 / 정수리는 넓어지고 평수가 작아지는 마음 / 속에 피어나 줬으면 해 한 송이의 평화 / 평화 진흙탕 속에 연화" (transl. Busy surviving rather than living / the crown of my head grows wider as the space in my heart grows smaller / I hope a single flower of peace will bloom within / a lotus flower rising from the muddy mire of peace.) The song samples a section from Starship Orchestra's "Yesterday", released in 1980. DJ Premier's producing was described by Newsis as repetitive while still carrying the narrative, adding that DJ Premier's production aesthetic in the song consisted of heavy basslines and loops.

== Music video ==
A day before the release of the song, a teaser was released featuring stop-motion animations of Dynamic Duo and DJ Premier with a miniature DJ set and outfits for the characters. Coinciding with the release of the song, a music video was published. Described by Hypebeast as a "flashy video" matching the track's energy, the music video features numerous cuts between Dynamic Duo dancing in front of a large, yellow light, many mannequins placed in a room, and the DJ set of DJ Premier.

== Reception ==
Kathleen Herrera of The K Meal said the song had "insane beats" creating momentum throughout the single and added that it becomes "better and better" with the "sharp" rapping. Herrera further stated that the music video contained "expressive dancing" and "incredible" visuals. Yoon So-yeon of Korea JoongAng Daily said that the song's "dramatic melody" and an easy to sing hook resulted in its acclaim. Newsis opined the song as "another modern classic of hip-hop" with Dynamic Duo's Korean style. Shin Hyun-tae, a committee member of the Korean Music Awards noted that challenge content has become "meme-ified", leading to cycles of media use. The refrain of "Aeao" is catchy and can appeal to numerous languages. DJ Premier's beat is "perfectly suited" for short form content, Shin said.

== Commercial success ==
In 2023, nine years after its release, "Aeao" had a surge in popularity, alongside "Smoke" (2023), which was released for Street Woman Fighter 2 (2023). Both songs were popular among K-pop artists, who performed dances to the songs on short-form platforms, including V and Jung Kook of BTS, Exo, and Seventeen. This resulted in "Aeao" being included in the 2023 TikTok top 10 summer songs from South Korea as well as top 1 in TikTok's weekly popularity chart. The duo expressed gratitude for the song's resurgence, stating, "The resurgence of "Aeao" was equally surprising. It was astonishing to see a song we never anticipated gaining popularity, particularly due to the trend of short-form content."

They said in an interview with Channel A that the reason the song went viral was presumably due to the "easy-to-follow chorus"; they also said they learned their song went viral after checking its popularity on TikTok, a platform they rarely use. The TikTok popularity as well as the spread of lip-syncing and photo editing content using the song prompted the duo to create their own TikTok account. Videos of the song accumulated approximately 130 million views across Instagram Reels, TikTok, and YouTube Shorts while accumulating over 100 million streams on Spotify across all of the song's versions. "Aeao" was announced to be included in the NBA 2K26 basketball game soundtrack after being featured in the franchise's soundtrack in 2015. On November 28, the song started entering the top song charts of Shazam, a music recognition platform, in nine countries in Asia. It gained top 85 in Thailand and top 89 in Korea. "Aeao" entered the Apple Music Hip-Hop/Rap song charts in 11 other Asian countries and gained number one in iTunes Thailand.

== Credits and personnel ==
Credits adapted from Apple Music (United States).

- Dynamic Duo – performer
- Choiza – vocals, songwriter
- Gaeko – vocals, songwriter
- Chris Martin – composer
- Jacques Burvick – composer
- DJ Premier – producer

== Charts ==
Weekly chart performance for "Aeao"
Chart (2022)	Peak position
South Korea (Circle Digital Chart)	96

== Release history ==
Release date and format(s) for "AEAO"
Region	Date	Format(s)	Version	Label	Ref.
Various	July 16, 2014	Digital download; streaming	Original	Amoeba Culture	
Various	August 22, 2023	Digital download; streaming	Sped Up	Amoeba Culture	
Various	August 22, 2023	Digital download; streaming	Slowed Down	Amoeba Culture	
