= Crush on You =

Crush on You may refer to:

- Crush on You (album), a 2014 album by Crush
- "Crush on You" (The Jets song), 1985, covered by Aaron Carter in 1997
- "Crush on You" (Lil' Kim song), 1996
- "Crush on You" (Nero song), 2011
- "Crush on You", a 1980 song by Bruce Springsteen from the album The River
- "Crush on You", a 1999 song by Roxette from the album Have a Nice Day
- "Crush on You", a 2013 song by Crush
- "Crush on You", a 2016 song by The Legend from the album Sound Up
- "Crush on You", a 2016 song by Babylon from the album Fantasy

== See also ==
- A Crush on You, a 2011 television film
- "I've Got a Crush on You", a 1928 George and Ira Gershwin song
- "Crush" (Mandy Moore song), a 2001 song with the refrain, "I got a crush on you"
