= Supreme Team (band) =

South Korean hip hop duo

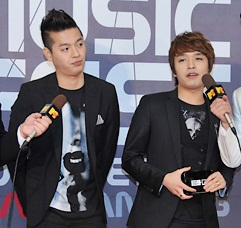
- Supreme Team in February 2011; Left to right: E-Sens and Simon Dominic

Background information
- Also known as: 슈프림팀
- Origin: Seoul, South Korea
- Genres: Hip hop
- Occupations: Rapper, singer, record producer
- Years active: 2009–2013
- Label: Amoeba Culture
- Past members: Simon Dominic; E-Sens
- Website: amoebaculture.com

Supreme Team (Korean: 슈프림팀) was a South Korean hip hop duo made up of Simon Dominic and E-Sens. They officially debuted in 2009 with their EP Supreme Team Guide To Excellent Adventure. Following their debut, they received a Mnet Asian Music Award (MAMA) for Best New Male Group. In April 2012, E-Sens was sentenced two years of probation for smoking marijuana. E-Sens returned to the music scene in October 2012 through the release of the song "독" (Poison) from hip hop producer Primary's album, Primary and the Messengers LP. Most recently, Supreme Team revealed and performed two new songs at the 2013 Amoebahood concert. This was their first time performing new music together in two years. In July 2013, news outlets reported Supreme Team's disbandment due to E-Sens' contract termination with Amoeba Culture. E-Sens confirmed the news himself in a tweet, adding his intent to focus on his solo career. Simon D later joined as co-CEO of AOMG with Jay Park.

== Discography ==
=== Studio albums ===
Title	Album details	Peak chart positions	Sales
Title	Album details	KOR	Sales
Supremier	Released: 18 March 2010; Label: Amoeba Culture; Formats: CD, digital download; Track listing: 1. Intro: Before Start (Intro: 시작 전); 2. M.U.S.I.C (feat. Choiza); 3. Then (그 때) (feat. Brian Joo); 4. Respect My Money; 5. Darling (feat. JC); 6. Step Up; 7. Where U At?; 8. Where To Go?; 9. Tired (피곤해) (feat. Sinyoung Kim); 10. Skit: Idiots (Skit: 바보들); 11. Shinobi (시노비) (feat. Tablo, DJ Pumkin); 12. Only You (너 하나면 돼) (feat. Gaeko); 13. Interlude: Seoul Scape; 14. Take Me (데려가) (feat. Beenzino)	3	KOR: 17,432

=== Extended plays ===
Title	Album details	Peak chart positions	Sales
Title	Album details	KOR (Note: The Gaon Music Chart was established in 2010.)	Sales
Supreme Team Guide To Excellent Adventure	Released: 14 July 2009; Label: Amoeba Culture; Formats: CD, digital download; Track listing: 1. Put It On (feat. Beatbox DG); 2. Supermagic; 3. Unknowingly (나만 모르게) (feat. T); 4. Maladjustment: 3 MC, Pt. 4.5 (부적응: 3 MC part 4.5) (feat. Dok2); 5. Drive; 6. Aritaum (아리따움) (feat. Dynamic Duo); 7. Do; 8. Hooligan's Anthem (훌리건) (feat. DJ Pumkin)	26	KOR: 1,610
Spin Off	Released: 3 June 2010; Label: Amoeba Culture; Formats: CD, digital download; Track listing: 1. Respect My Money; 2. Shinobi (시노비) (feat. Tablo, DJ Pumkin); 3. Dang Dang Dang (땡땡땡); 4. What!? (뭐!?) (feat. Yankie, DJ Pumkin); 5. Super Lady; 6. Step Up (Simo Remix) (Bonus Track)	6	KOR: 2,213
Ames Room (with Youngjun)	Released: 1 October 2010; Label: Amoeba Culture; Formats: CD, digital download; Track listing: 1. Then Then Then (그땐 그땐 그땐); 2. Why (왜); 3. Ready Gaga (feat. 정유진); 4. Then Then Then (그땐 그땐 그땐) (Inst.); 5. Why (왜) (Inst.)	4	—N/a

=== Singles ===
Title	Year	Peak chart positions	Sales	Album
Title	Year	KOR (Note: The Gaon Music Chart was established in 2010.)	Sales	Album
As lead artist
"Supermagic"	2009	—N/a	—N/a	Supreme Team Guide To Excellent Adventure
"Step Up"	2010	20	—N/a	Supremier
"Dang Dang Dang" (땡땡땡)	2010	12	KOR: 1,973,089	Spin Off
"Because Of You" (너 때문이야) Feat. Soulman	2010	14	—N/a	Blue Brand 2nd Trauma, Part 2
"Why" (왜) with Youngjun	2010	1	KOR: 1,590,072	Ames Rooms
"Then Then Then" (그땐 그땐 그땐) with Youngjun	2010	1	KOR: 2,108,253	Ames Rooms
"Romeo & Juliet" (로미오 & 줄리엣)	2010	11	—N/a	Shin Seung Hun 20th Anniversary with Friends
"I Was Full" (배가 불렀지) feat. Gaeko	2011	5	KOR: 940,460	Non-album singles
"You Can Stay" (그대로 있어도 돼) feat. Crush	2013	4	KOR: 755,725	Non-album singles
As featured artist
"Leach" (거머리) Double Trouble (Basick and Innovator) feat. Supreme Team	2009	—N/a	—N/a	Trouble Makerz
"My Girl" (내 여자) Brian Joo feat. Supreme Team	2009	40	—N/a	Manifold
"L.O.V.E" Lee Ki-chan feat. Supreme Team	2010	10	—N/a	Non-album single
"Amazed" (기가 차) K.Will feat. Supreme Team, Sistar	2011	2	KOR: 69,892	My Heart is Beating
"Uppercut" (어퍼컷) Insooni feat. Supreme Team	2011	86	—N/a	Non-album singles
"Dancing Heart" (심장이 춤춘다) Kim Sori feat. Supreme Team	2011	24	KOR: 418,500	Non-album singles
"Magic Glass" (요지경) Primary feat. Supreme Team, Yankie, Mellow	2011	79	KOR: 66,195	Primary and the Messengers
Soundtrack appearances
"Get Ready"	2011	28	—N/a	Athena: Goddess of War OST

== Awards ==
- Mnet Asian Music Awards – Best New Male Group (2009)
- Mnet 20's Choice Awards – 20 Most Influential Stars (2010)
- Golden Disk Awards – Hip hop Award (2010)
