= Crush (singer) =

South Korean singer (born 1992)

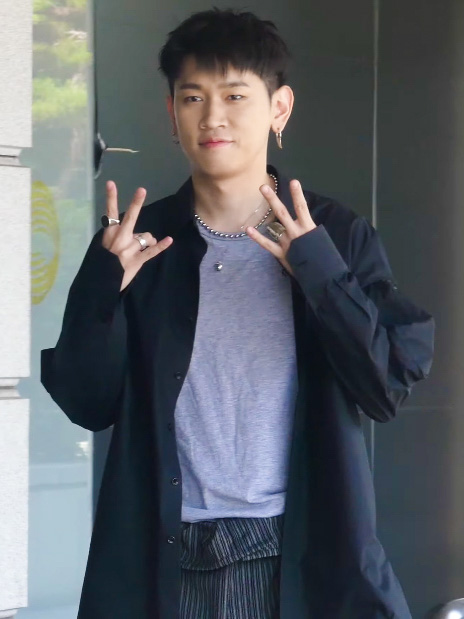
- Crush in July 2019
- Born: Shin Hyo-seob; May 3, 1992 (age 34); Seoul, South Korea
- Occupation: Singer · songwriter · record producer
- Years active: 2012–present
- Musical career
- Genres: Hip hop; K-pop; R&B
- Labels: Amoeba Culture; P Nation

Korean name
- Hangul: 신효섭
- RR: Sin Hyoseop
- MR: Sin Hyosŏp

Shin Hyo-seob (Korean: 신효섭; born May 3, 1992), professionally known as Crush (크러쉬), is a South Korean singer-songwriter and record producer. He debuted on April 1, 2014, with the single "Sometimes" and released his first album Crush on You on June 5, 2014. Fifteen of Crush's singles have peaked in the top ten on the Gaon Digital Chart, with ten of Crush's singles also becoming top five hits including "Just", "Beautiful", "Don't Forget", "Bittersweet", "Let Us Go", and "Rush Hour".

== Life and career ==
=== Early life and career beginnings ===
Crush was born Shin Hyo-seob on May 3, 1992. Raised in Seoul, he began listening to R&B and hip hop music at a young age and aspired to become a singer. Dynamic Duo's debut album Taxi Driver left a "deep impression" on him, which inspired him to begin rapping. He began making music during his first year of middle school with a friend and sending demos to the group's record label Amoeba Culture. During this time, he experimented with jazz musical instruments in his style of music, implementing modern tunes. Nicknamed "Shi Syeob" (시셥), he wrote the moniker "C-sub" in English as a tentative stage name. His friend misread it as "Crush", which he took an immediate liking to and decided to use. Crush attended Hoseo University and graduated from the Department of Practical Music.

While taking a break from school, Crush sent Zion.T his demos after meeting at a hip hop party. The two became acquainted and, along with Gray, Loco, and Elo, formed the music crew VV:D in 2012.

Crush released the single "Red Dress" featuring TakeOne on December 7, 2012. He contributed to his first song as a record producer and guest artist on Loco's single "No More". In the following year, he released the singles "Crush on You" and "Where Do You Wanna Go" with Taewan and Gary. In July 2013, Crush signed an exclusive contract with Amoeba Culture.

=== 2014–2015: Debut and rising popularity ===
Crush officially debuted on April 1, 2014, with a single titled "Sometimes". His first album, Crush on You, was released on June 5, 2014, and went on to win Best R&B & Soul Album at the 12th Korean Music Awards. In 2014, Crush also collaborated with Gaeko for the single "Hug Me". In August, he sang the OST "Sleepless Night" for the SBS drama It's Okay, That's Love. In October, Crush released the track "Sofa".

In 2015, Crush collaborated with Zion.T for the single "Just". The song was released on January 30, 2015, and debuted at number one on the Gaon Singles Chart. Crush and Zion.T won Best Collaboration at the 17th Mnet Asian Music Awards. In July, Crush released the single "Oasis" which featured Block B's Zico. In November, Crush held his first solo concert, Crush on You.

=== 2016–2018: Breakthrough and widespread recognition ===
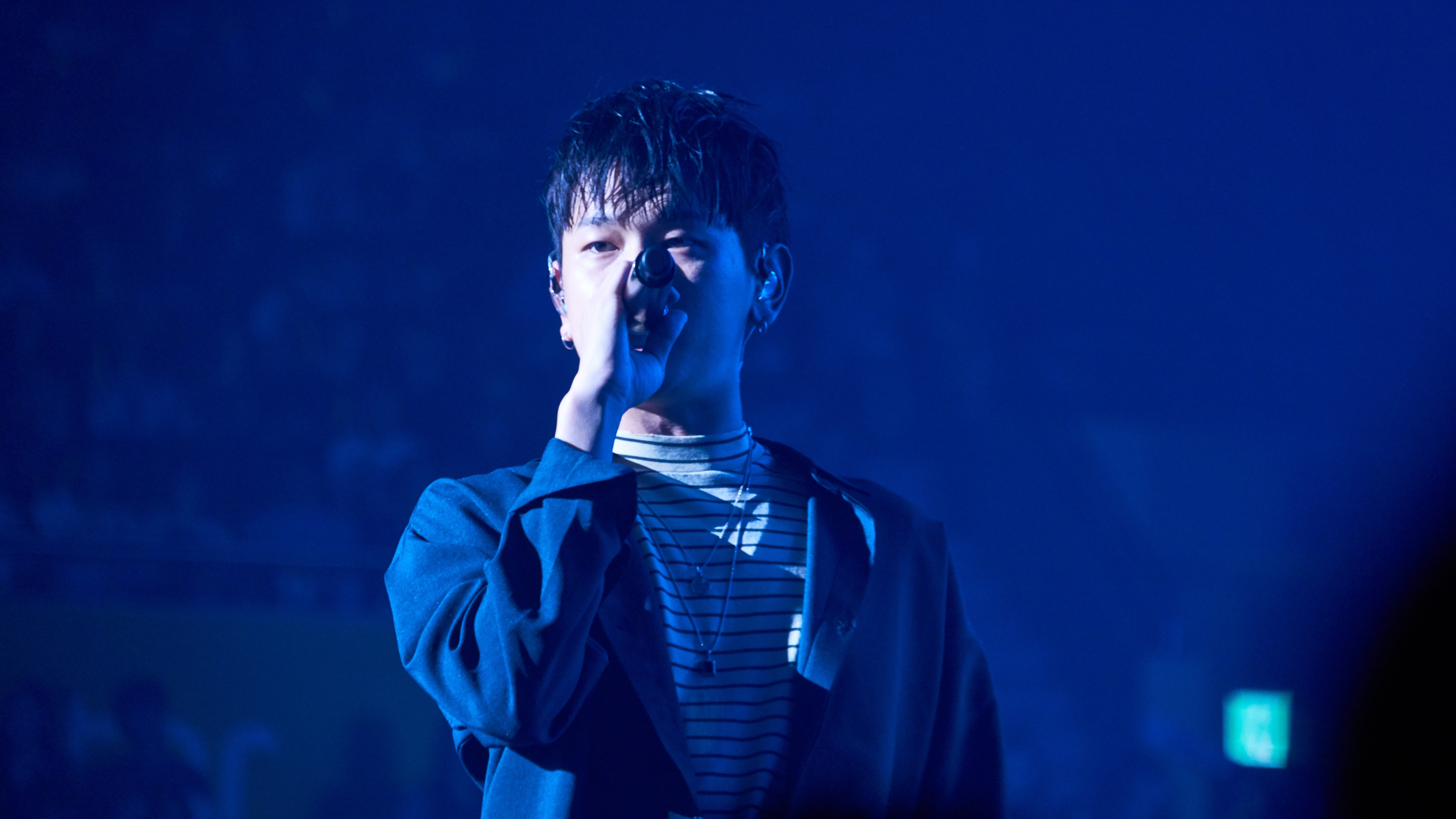
Crush performing in 2017

In January 2016, Crush released the single "Don't Forget" featuring Girls' Generation's Taeyeon. "Don't Forget" won first place on Show Champion on January 27, marking his first music show win. Crush also went on to win Best Vocal Performance - Male Solo at the 18th Mnet Asian Music Awards.

In 2016, Crush became an active member of the hip-hop crew Fanxy Child, consisting of Zico (rapper, producer), Dean (singer, producer), Penomeco (rapper), Millic (DJ, producer), Staytuned (producer).

In July 2018, Crush released his third extended play Wonderlost. As with his previous projects, Crush was heavily involved in the songwriting, composition, and production of his album, stating: "I'm able to do the full production... I can make my own arrangements, and oversee the entire process."

In December 2016, Crush also released the hit OST "Beautiful" for the tvN drama Guardian: The Lonely and Great God, and later received a nomination for Best OST at the 19th Mnet Asian Music Awards.

=== 2019: Second full-length album and continued popularity ===
On June 4, 2019, Crush stated on his Instagram that he would be leaving Amoeba Records to start his own agency. However, on July 17, 2019, he announced that he had decided to sign with Psy's agency, P Nation. On December 5, 2019, Crush released his critically acclaimed second full-length album From Midnight To Sunrise, with "Alone" and "With You" serving as the album's double lead singles. Crush once again took control of songwriting and production for the album, and introduced jazz elements alongside R&B. From Midnight To Sunrise won R&B Album of the Year at the Korean Hip-hop Awards.

In February 2020, Crush released the OST "Let Us Go" for the television series Crash Landing on You. In May 2020, it was announced that Crush had asked Joy of Red Velvet to feature on the lead single of his next album. The song, titled "Mayday", topped multiple music charts upon its release. On October 20, 2020, Crush released his fourth EP called With Her. The songs all feature a collaboration with Korean female artists such as Taeyeon, Bibi, LeeHi, Lee So-ra, and Yoon Mi-rae.

On October 31, 2022, P Nation announced that the opening of tickets reservations for Crush's upcoming tour, the Crush on You Tour, would be postponed to respect the mourning period established after the Seoul Halloween crowd crush.

On October 2026, Crush released the single "Seesaw" in collaboration with IU, marking his first song released under his name in about a year.

== Personal life ==
On May 22, 2016, he participated in the Han River Space "Brain Fade Competition (멍 때리기 대회)" and won the title.

=== Military service ===
On November 12, 2020, Crush enlisted for his mandatory military service. On August 11, 2022, Crush was discharged from his military service.

=== Relationship ===
On August 23, 2021, Crush was confirmed to be in a relationship with singer and actress Joy, whom he had collaborated with during the previous year.

== Discography ==
=== Studio albums ===
Title	Album details	Peak chart positions	Sales
Title	Album details	KOR	Sales
Crush on You	Released: June 5, 2014; Label: Amoeba Culture; Formats: CD, digital download	6	KOR: 4,983
From Midnight to Sunrise	Released: December 5, 2019; Label: P Nation, Dreamus; Formats: CD, digital download; Track listing: 1. "From Midnight to Sunrise"; 2. "Wake Up" (featuring Dean); 3. "Wonderlust" (featuring Band Wonderlust); 4. "With You"; 5. "Alone"; 6. "Tiki-Taka" (featuring DPR Live); 7. "Sunset"; 8. "Butterfly"; 9. "Ibiza"; 10. "Cloth"; 11. "Sleep No More"; 12. "Nighty Night" (featuring Zion.T)	19	KOR: 5,404
Wonderego	Released: November 14, 2023; Label: P Nation, Dreamus; Formats: CD, digital download; Track listing: 1. "New Day"; 2. "Hmm-cheat"; 3. "No Break" (featuring Dynamic Duo); 4. "Me Myself & I"; 5. "Satisfied" (featuring Penomeco); 6. "Deep End" (featuring Amaka); 7. "EZPZ"; 8. "Nothing Else" (featuring Kim Ximya); 9. "Got Me Got U"; 10. "Bad Habits" (featuring Lee Hi); 11. "Ego"; 12. "Ego's Theme - Interlude"; 13. "A Man Like Me"; 14. "Monday Blues"; 15. "You"; 16. "She"; 17. "Harness"; 18. "For Days to Come"; 19. "Remember Me"	21	KOR: 7,489

=== Extended plays ===
Title	EP details	Peak chart positions		Sales
Title	EP details	KOR	US World	Sales
Interlude	Released: May 6, 2016; Label: Amoeba Culture; Formats: CD, digital download; Track listing: 1. In the Air; 2. woo ah 3. 9 to 5 (Feat. Gaeko); 4. Castaway (feat. MISO); 5. Dust	13	14	KOR: 2,894
Wonderlust	Released: October 14, 2016; Label: Amoeba Culture; Formats: CD, Digital download; Track listing: 1. wonderlust 2. 2411; 3. nostalgia 4. Fall; 5. Like My Father	8	—	KOR: 2,193
Wonderlost	Released: July 13, 2018; Label: Amoeba Culture; Formats: CD, digital download; Track listing: 1. Chill (feat. Sik-K); 2. Endorphin (feat. Penomeco & Punchnello); 3. Cereal (feat. Zico); 4. Close Your Eyes (feat. Hoody); 5. RYO (feat. CIFIKA & Byung Un)	18	10	KOR: 3,440
With Her	Released: October 20, 2020; Label: P Nation; Formats: CD, digital download	21	—	KOR: 6,607
Fang	Released: August 28, 2025; Label: P Nation; Formats: CD, digital download, streaming	29	—	KOR: 2,974

=== Singles ===
==== As lead artist ====
Title	Year	Peak chart positions	Sales	Album
Title	Year	KOR	Sales	Album
"Red Dress"	2012	—	—N/a	Non-album singles
"Crush on You"	2013	—	—N/a	Non-album singles
"Where Do You Wanna Go" (어디 갈래) (with Gary, Taewan)	2013	20	—N/a	Non-album singles
"Sometimes" (가끔)	2014	8	KOR: 490,326	Crush on You
"Hug Me" (featuring Gaeko)	2014	10	KOR: 473,724	Crush on You
"Sofa"	2014	26	KOR: 338,947	Non-album singles
"Just" (그냥) (with Zion.T)	2015	1	KOR: 1,271,279	Non-album singles
"Oasis" (featuring Zico)	2015	5	KOR: 851,365	Non-album singles
"Don't Forget" (잊어버리지마) (featuring Taeyeon)	2016	2	KOR: 2,500,000	Non-album singles
"9 to 5" (featuring Gaeko)	2016	59	KOR: 97,385	Interlude
"Woo Ah" (우아해)	2016	4	KOR: 571,012	Interlude
"highfive" (with Dynamic Duo, Primary, Boi B)	2016	23	KOR: 113,585	Non-album singles
"Skip" (with Han Sang-won)	2016	21	KOR: 120,794	Non-album singles
"Fall" (어떻게 지내)	2016	2	KOR: 745,746	Wonderlust
"Summer Love"	2017	87	KOR: 53,354	Outside
"Outside" (featuring Beenzino)	2017	12	KOR: 165,530	Outside
"Don't Be Shy" (featuring Sik-K)	2017	88	KOR: 51,202	Outside
"Be by My Side" (내 편이 돼줘)	2017	19	KOR: 95,596	Non-album singles
"Bittersweet" (잊을만하면)	2018	3	—N/a	Non-album singles
"Cereal" (featuring Zico)	2018	20	—N/a	Wonderlost
"None"	2018	22	—N/a	Non-album singles
"Lay Your Head on Me"	2018	—	—N/a	Non-album singles
"Nappa"	2019	7	—N/a	Non-album singles
"With You"	2019	95	—N/a	From Midnight to Sunrise
"Alone"	2019	87	—N/a	From Midnight to Sunrise
"Mayday" (자나깨나) (featuring Joy)	2020	32	—N/a	Homemade 1
"Ohio"	2020	41	—N/a	Non-album single
"Let Me Go" (놓아줘) (with Taeyeon)	2020	8	—N/a	With Her
"Rush Hour" (featuring J-Hope)	2022	4	—N/a	Non-album single
"Hmm-cheat" (흠칫)	2023	86	—N/a	Wonderego
"Ego" (미워)	2023	32	—N/a	Wonderego
"By Your Side"	2024	48	—N/a	Non-album singles
"Yin and Yang" (with Zico featuring Dean and Penomeco)	2026	133	—N/a	Non-album singles
"Seesaw" (삐그덕) (featuring IU)	2026	21	—N/a	Non-album singles
"—" denotes a recording that did not chart or was not released in that region.

==== As featured artist ====
Title	Year	Album
"No More" (Loco feat. Crush)	2012	Non-album single
"Two Melodies" (뻔한 멜로디) (Zion.T feat. Crush)	2013	Red Light
"You Can Stay" (그대로 있어도 돼) (Supreme Team feat. Crush)	2013	Non-album singles
"Blink (Remix)" (깜빡) (Gray feat. Crush, Elo, Jinbo)	2013	Non-album singles
"Shower Later" (Gary feat. Crush)	2014	Mr. Gae
"Stupid Love" (Rhythm Power feat. Crush)	2014	Wolmido Dogs
"JaJaJa" (YDG feat. Dynamic Duo, Crush)	2014	Non-album single
"Hold Me Tight" (감아) (Loco feat. Crush)	2014	Locomotive
"247" (일주일) (Junggigo feat. Crush, Zion.T, Dean)	2015	Across the Universe
"what2do" (Dean feat. Crush, Jeff Bernat)	2016	130 Mood: TRBL
"No Sense" (No 눈치) (Sam Kim feat. Crush)	2016	I Am Sam
"Let's Play House" (몸만와) (Choiza, Primary feat. Crush)	2016	Hobby
"Let It Be" (재방송) (C Jamm feat. Crush)	2016	Show Me the Money 5 Ep. 5
"For You" (Penomeco feat. Crush, Punchnello)	2016	Non-album single
"Corona" (Punchnello feat. Crush)	2016	Lime
"Still" (남아있어) (Loco feat. Crush)	2016	Bleached
"Sometimes" (가끔) (Geeks feat. Crush, Giriboy)	2016	Fireworks
"Bermuda Triangle" (Zico feat. Dean, Crush)	2016	Television
"Laputa" (DPR Live feat. Crush)	2017	Coming to You Live
"Party (Shut Down)" (Sik-K feat. Crush)	2017	H. A. L. F. (Have.A.Little.Fun)
"So to Say" (말하자면) (Jinbo feat. Crush, Hoody)	2017	KRNB2 Part. 2
"Love Story" (러브스토리) (Suran feat. Crush)	2017	Non-album singles
"Clock Out" (퇴근) (Swings feat. Jay Park, Crush)	2017	Non-album singles
"Dongseong-ro" (동성로) (Rhythm Power feat. Crush)	2017	Non-album singles
"Sweaty" (SAAY feat. Crush)	2017	Claassic
"Your Dog Loves You" (헷갈려) (Colde feat. Crush)	2018	Your Dog Loves You
"Peace" (평화) (Giriboy feat. Crush, Choi LB)	2018	hightechnology
"Slip N Slide" (미끌미끌) (SOMDEF feat. Crush)	2018	Some Definition of Love
"Sunshine" (Hoody feat. Crush)	2018	Non-album single
"One of Those Nights" (센 척 안 해) (Key feat. Crush)	2018	Face
"No. 5" (Penomeco feat. Crush)	2018	Garden
"Blue Hawaii" (Punchnello feat. Crush, Penomeco)	2019	ordinary.
"Lovedrunk" (술이 달다) (Epik High feat. Crush)	2019	Sleepless in __________
"Now or Never" (지금이 아니면) (CIFIKA feat. Crush, Woo Won-jae)	2019	Non-album single
"Blue" (Dynamic Duo feat. Crush, Sole)	2019	Off Duty
"Make Her Dance" (Simon Dominic feat. Loopy, Crush)	2019	No Open Flames
"Late Autumn" (만추) (Heize feat. Crush)	2019	Late Autumn
"I Been" (Berhana feat. Crush)	2019	Han
"Starry Night" (BoA feat Crush)	2019	Starry Night
"Darling" (Sik-K feat. Crush)	2020	Headliner
"Missed Call" (부재중) (nov feat. Crush)	2020	Non-album singles
"Jam and Butterfly" (DPR Live feat. Crush, eaJ)	2020	Non-album singles
"For You" (Lee Hi feat. Crush)	2020	Non-album singles
"I Adore You" (Chan feat. Crush)	2022	Look at Me !!!
"Circle" (Code Kunst feat. Crush)	2023	Remember Archive
"Bleaching" (백화) (Millic feat. Crush)	2023	~
"Right Now" (Coogie feat. Crush)	2023	Non-album single
"900 Wasps" (Mount XLR feat. Crush)	2023	Forte / 900 Wasps
"Yes or No" (GroovyRoom feat. Huh Yunjin, Crush)	2024	Non-album single
"Watching TV" (Mark feat. Crush)	2025	The Firstfruit

=== Soundtrack appearances ===
Title	Year	Peak chart positions				Sales	Album
Title	Year	KOR	KOR Songs	US World	WW	Sales	Album
"Sleepless Night" (잠 못드는 밤) (feat. Punch)	2014	4	N/A	—	—	KOR: 630,589	It's Okay, That's Love OST
"Perhaps That" (아마도 그건) (with Loco)	2015	44	N/A	—	—	KOR: 754,272	Two Yoo Project Sugar Man Part 3
"Beautiful"	2016	2	N/A	—	—	KOR: 2,500,000	Guardian: The Lonely and Great God OST
"Let Us Go" (둘만의 세상으로 가)	2020	3	N/A	—	—	—N/a	Crash Landing on You OST
"No Words" (어떤 말도)	2020	76	N/A	—	—	—N/a	Itaewon Class OST
"Click Like" (feat. Paul Blanco)	2023	31	—	—	—	—N/a	Street Woman Fighter 2 OST
"Love You with All My Heart" (미안해 미워해 사랑해)	2024	6	9	4	184	—N/a	Queen of Tears OST
"—" denotes a recording that did not chart or was not released in that region.

=== Other charted songs ===
Title	Year	Peak chart positions	Album
Title	Year	KOR	Album
"Wake Up" (featuring Dean)	2019	145	From Midnight to Sunrise
"Tiki-Taka" (featuring DPR Live)	2019	155	From Midnight to Sunrise

== Filmography ==
=== Television shows ===
Year	Title	Role	Ref.
2023	No Math School Trip	Cast Member	

== Awards and nominations ==
Award	Year	Category	Nominated work	Result	Ref.
Asia Artist Awards	2017	Best Icon Award – Music	—N/a	Won	
Circle Chart Music Awards	2017	Song of the Year – January	"Don't Forget" (feat. Taeyeon)	Nominated	
Circle Chart Music Awards	2019	Song of the Year – August	"Nappa"	Nominated	
Circle Chart Music Awards	2023	Artist of the Year – September	"Rush Hour" (with J-Hope)	Nominated	
Golden Disc Awards	2017	Digital Bonsang	"Don't Forget" (feat. Taeyeon)	Nominated	
Golden Disc Awards	2017	Best R&B Award	—N/a	Won	
Golden Disc Awards	2025	Best OST	"Love You With All My Heart"	Won	
Korea Drama Awards	2017	Best Original Soundtrack	"Beautiful"	Nominated	
Korean Hip-hop Awards	2017	R&B Album of the Year	Interlude	Nominated	
Korean Hip-hop Awards	2017	R&B Track of the Year	"Woo Ah"	Won	
Korean Hip-hop Awards	2020	R&B Album of the Year	From Midnight To Sunrise	Won	
Korean Hip-hop Awards	2021	R&B Album of the Year	With Her	Nominated	
Korean Hip-hop Awards	2021	R&B Track of the Year	"Ohio"	Nominated	
Korean Hip-hop Awards	2023	R&B Track of the Year	"Rush Hour"	Won	
Korean Hip-hop Awards	2024	R&B Album of the Year	Wonderego	Nominated	
Korean Hip-hop Awards	2024	R&B Track of the Year	"Ego"	Nominated	
Korean Music Awards	2015	Best R&B & Soul Album	Crush on You	Won	
Korean Music Awards	2015	Best R&B & Soul Song	"Hug Me" (feat. Gaeko)	Nominated	
Korean Music Awards	2015	Rookie of the Year	—N/a	Nominated	
Korean Music Awards	2016	Best R&B & Soul Song	"Just" (with Zion.T)	Nominated	
Korean Music Awards	2024	Best R&B & Soul Album	Wonderego	Nominated	
Melon Music Awards	2015	Best R&B / Soul	"Oasis" (feat. Zico)	Nominated	
Melon Music Awards	2015	Top 10 Artists	—N/a	Nominated	
Melon Music Awards	2016	Best R&B / Soul	"Don't Forget" (feat. Taeyeon)	Nominated	
Melon Music Awards	2016	Top 10 Artists	—N/a	Nominated	
Melon Music Awards	2019	Best R&B / Soul	"Nappa"	Nominated	
Mnet Asian Music Awards	2015	Best Collaboration	"Just" (with Zion.T)	Won	
Mnet Asian Music Awards	2016	Best Male Artist	"Don't Forget" (feat. Taeyeon)	Nominated	
Mnet Asian Music Awards	2016	Best Vocal Performance – Male Solo	"Don't Forget" (feat. Taeyeon)	Won	
Mnet Asian Music Awards	2017	Best OST	"Beautiful"	Nominated	
Mnet Asian Music Awards	2018	Best HipHop & Urban Music	"Bittersweet"	Nominated	
Mnet Asian Music Awards	2019	Best HipHop & Urban Music	"Nappa"	Nominated	
Mnet Asian Music Awards	2022	Best Collaboration	"Rush Hour" (with J-Hope)	Nominated	
Mnet Asian Music Awards	2024	Best OST	"Love You With All My Heart"	Won	
Seoul Music Awards	2016	Bonsang Award	—N/a	Nominated	
Seoul Music Awards	2017	Bonsang Award	—N/a	Nominated	
Seoul Music Awards	2022	Bonsang Award	—N/a	Nominated	
Soribada Best K-Music Awards	2018	R&B Artist Award	—N/a	Won	
Soribada Best K-Music Awards	2024	Best OST	"Love You With All My Heart"	Won	
