= Amoeba Culture =

South Korean record label

- Industry: Music
- Genre: Korean hip hop; R&B
- Founded: August 18, 2006
- Founder: Gaeko; Choiza; Go Kyung-min
- Headquarters: Mapo-gu, Seoul, South Korea
- Key people: Go Kyung-min (CEO)
- Owner: CJ ENM Entertainment Division
- Website: www.act-seoul.com

Amoeba Culture (Korean: 아메바 컬쳐) is a South Korean record label established in 2006 by Gaeko and Choiza (of hip hop duo Dynamic Duo) and Go Kyung-min. The label is currently home to music artists Dynamic Duo, Sole, Thama, Snzae and Huh, and to music producer Padi. The label's former artists include Supreme Team, Zion.T, Crush, Primary, Rhythm Power and Ha:tfelt.

Amoeba Culture had the third largest sales among South Korean record labels in 2015.

== History ==
Amoeba Culture was founded in August 2006 by Dynamic Duo members Gaeko and Choiza, as well as current CEO Go Kyung-min. The label held open auditions in late 2007 in order to expand its roster. In 2008, composer and producer Primary and hip hop duo Supreme Team joined the company.

In 2011 the label released a series of toy figurines and started the "AMOEBAHOOD" project to promote exhibits and other cultural art projects. They also established the Amoeba Culture recording studio in October 2011. In 2012 the label held the first "Amoebahood Concerts" at Daegu Exco and KBS Busan Hall in February, as well as the House of Blues in LA and the Showbox at the Market in Seattle in April with Kero One. Zion.T also announced that he had signed with the label that summer.

In 2013 all of the label's artist participated in the 'NOWeekend' project which culminated in an album. The group also held the "2013 Amoebahood Concerts" on March 16 and 17. On July 19, 2013, Supreme Team disbanded when member E-Sens's contract ended. That summer E-Sens released tracks alleging the company had offered him a slave contract and that they had stolen money which the label denied. In January 2014 the other former Supreme Team member, Simon D, left the label as well.

In November 2017, CJ E&M acquired Amoeba Culture. CJ E&M official stated that, "We are investing to support the development of hip-hop music and free creative activities by artists".

On July 7, 2023, it was announced that Go Kyungmin had died on July 6 at Seoul St. Mary's Hospital.

== Controversies ==
=== Plagiarism accusations against Primary ===
For the 2013 Infinity Challenge Music Festival, Primary collaborated with Park Myeong-su and label mate Gaeko (Dynamic Duo) for the song "I Got C". Later, netizens noticed similarities between "I Got C" and Dutch singer Caro Emerald's "Liquid Lunch." Rumors of plagiarism later followed.

In an interview by Seoul Shinmun NTN's "Dispatch," Caro Emerald's production team member David Schreurs said, "[Primary] uses our music as a template to create his own, which is an honor but on some songs he's just going too far with it. I would like to say he should start trusting his own talent, because he sure is a good producer." As a result, Munhwa Broadcasting Corporation (MBC), the network behind "Infinity Challenge," as well as KT Music, the publisher of the album and songs from the "2013 Infinity Challenge Music Festival," ceased online sales of "I Got C."

Another Primary composition, Park Ji-yoon's Mr. Lee (featuring San E) was also later accused of plagiarism.

=== 2013: "The Control Diss Phenomenon" ===
- July 19 – E-Sens (Supreme Team) left Amoeba Culture.
- August 12 – American hip hop artist Big Sean released a promotional single called "Control", with a verse from Kendrick Lamar that called on all hip hop artists to "step up and save hip hop".
- August 21 – Swings, the Korean American rapper affiliated with Illest Konfusion, UPT and Overclass, released the diss track "King Swings" through the YouTube channel of his agency at the time, Brand New Music. It was met with responses from Ugly Duck, Takeone and Deepflow.
- August 22 – E-Sens shocked the Korean hip hop community when he released "You Can't Control Me", dissing his former agency and label mate Gaeko (Dynamic Duo).
- August 23 – Swings released another diss, "Hwang Jung-min (King Swings Part 2)". He dissed Simon Dominic (Supreme Team) this time.
- August 24 – Gaeko broke his silence and released "I Can Control You", then E-Sens responded with "True Story". Meanwhile, Simon Dominic answered back at Swings through "Control".
- August 26 – Swings lashed back at Simon Dominic with "New World". Meanwhile, Amoeba Culture issued a statement saying "it respects the opinions of its artists and will let them handle it themselves (in regards to Gaeko and Simon Dominic's disses)".
- August 27 – The exchange of diss tracks came to an end.

== Artists ==
=== Groups ===
- Dynamic Duo

=== Soloists ===
- Gummy
- Huh (허성현)
- Since(신스)

=== Producers ===
- Padi

== Former artists ==
- 0CD
- J-Tong
- Supreme Team (2009–2013)
  - Simon Dominic (2009–2013)
  - E-Sens (2009–2013)
- Zion.T (2013–2016)
- Crush (2014–2019)
- Bang Jae-min (2017–2019)
- Primary (2008–2020)
- Rhythm Power (2010–2020)
- Ha:tfelt (2017–2023)
- Sole (쏠)
- Thama (따마)

== Discography ==
Year	Work	Artist
2007	Enlightened: Album	Dynamic Duo
2007	LOVE is ENLIGHTENED: Album	Dynamic Duo
2008	Last Days: Album	Dynamic Duo
2009	"Ballad for Fallen Soul Part 1"	Dynamic Duo
2009	Supreme Team Guide To Excellent Adventure: Extended Play	Supreme Team
2009	Band of Dynamic Brothers: Album	Dynamic Duo
2010	Supremier: Album	Supreme Team
2010	Spin off: Album	Supreme Team
2010	"Ames Room"	Supreme Team
2011	"Homage to Quincy Jones" project	Primary, Supreme Team, Dynamic Duo
2011	Primary And The Messengers: Album	Primary
2011	DYNAMICDUO 6th DIGILOG 1/2: Album	Dynamic Duo
2012	DYNAMICDUO 6th DIGILOG 2/2: Album	Dynamic Duo
2012	Primary And The Messengers Part 2: Album	Primary
2012	Primary And The Messengers Part 3: Album	Primary
2012	Primary And The Messengers Part 4: Album	Primary
2012	Everyone is good-looking, Rhythm Power: Album	Rhythm Power
2012	"Air" Nike Air Force 1 30th Anniversary Collaboration Track	All
2012	Mohican and the Barefoot: Album	J-Tong
2013	NOWeekend Project: Album	All
2014	Crush on You: Album	Crush
