= With Her =

EP by Crush
- Released: October 20, 2020
- Length: 18:05
- Language: Korean
- Label: P Nation; Dreamus

Crush chronology
From Midnight to Sunrise (2019)	With Her (2020)

Singles from With Her
- 1. "Let Me Go" Released: October 20, 2020

Music video
- "Let Me Go" on YouTube

With Her (stylized as with HER) is the fourth extended play by South Korean singer Crush. It consists of five tracks including the title track "Let Me Go". In accordance with the album title, each track features a female artist. The album was released on October 20, 2020, by P Nation, under license by Dreamus.

== Background and release ==
On October 12, 2020, P Nation announced that Crush's fourth EP would be released on October 20, 2020. This marked Crush's first project following his album From Midnight to Sunrise, released in December 2019. On October 19, 2020, the music video teaser for the lead single "Let Her Go" was released and the featured artist of title track is Taeyeon, making it their first collaboration in four years, having previously collaborated on the song, "Don't Forget" in 2016. In 2020, the EP originally peaked at position 23 on the Gaon Album chart, but in March 2021 the EP re-entered the chart at a new peak of 21.

== Track listing ==
With Her track listing
No.	Title	Lyrics	Music	Arrangement	Length
1.	"Let Me Go" (Korean: 놓아줘; with Taeyeon)	Crush; Kim Mandy	Crush; Hong So Jin	Hong So Jin	3:31
2.	"Tip Toe" (with Lee Hi)	Crush; Lee Hi	Crush; Lee Hi; Unsinkable; Beautiful Disco	Unsinkable; Beautiful Disco	3:02
3.	"Love Encore" (Korean: 춤; with Lee So-ra)	Crush; nov	Crush; nov; Hyunki	Crush; Hyunki	3:30
4.	"Step by Step" (with Yoon Mi-rae)	Crush; Kim Mandy	Crush; Hong So Jin	Crush; Hong So Jin	4:32
5.	"She Said" (with Bibi)	Crush; Bibi	Crush; Bibi; Stay Tuned	Crush; Stay Tuned	3:28
Total length:					18:05

== Charts ==
Weekly chart performance for With Her
Chart (2021)	Peak position
South Korean Albums (Gaon)	21

== Release history ==
Release history for With Her
Region	Date	Format	Label	Ref.
South Korea	October 20, 2020	CD; digital download; streaming	P Nation; Dreamus	
Various	October 20, 2020	Digital download; streaming	P Nation; Dreamus	
South Korea	November 3, 2020	LP	P Nation; Dreamus	
