= Dynamic Duo (South Korean duo) =

South Korean hip hop duo

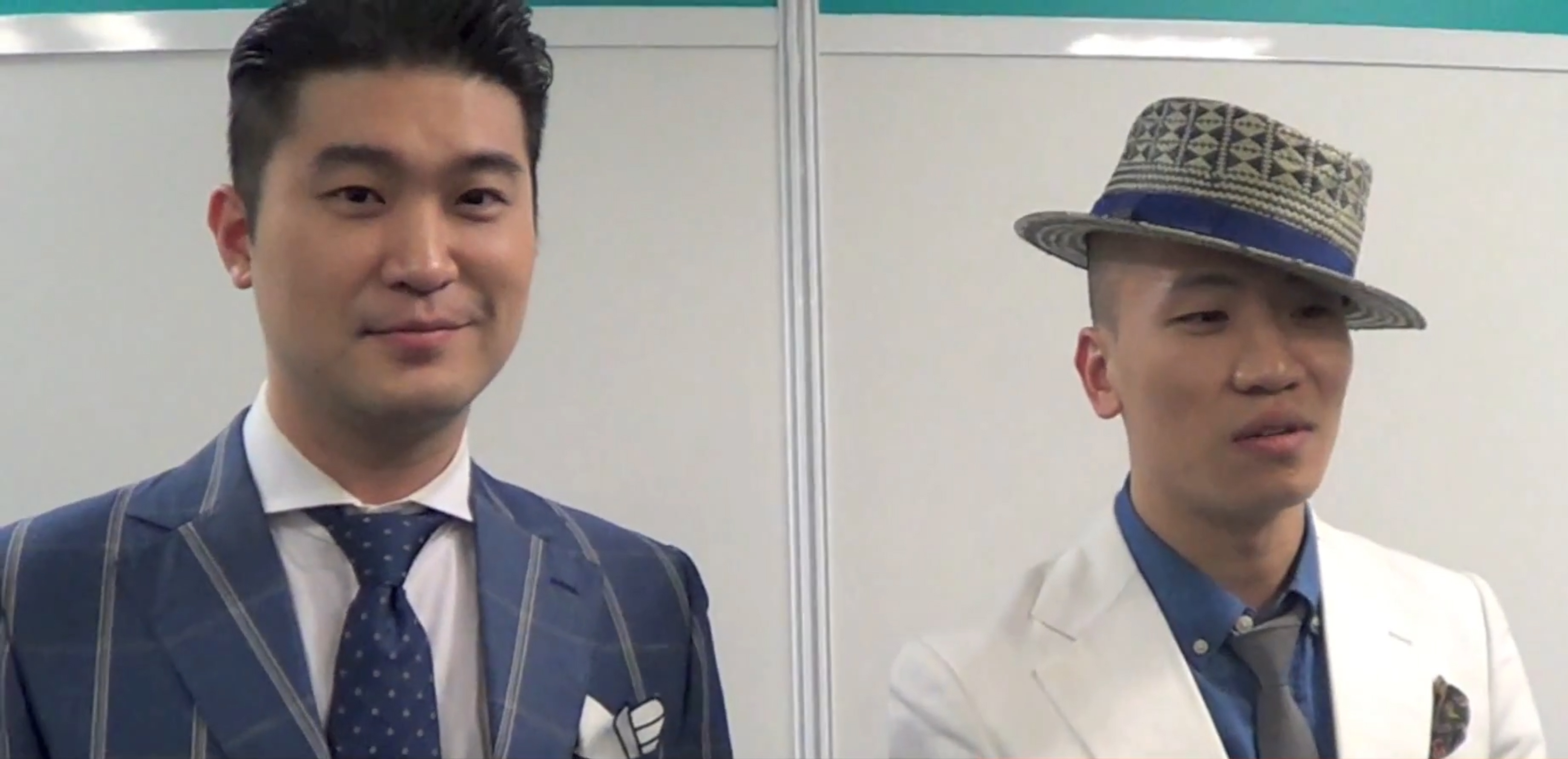
- Dynamic Duo in 2014; Left to right: Choiza and Gaeko

Background information
- Origin: Seoul, South Korea
- Genres: Hip hop
- Years active: 1999–present
- Label: Amoeba Culture
- Members: Choiza; Gaeko
- Website: Official Website

Dynamic Duo (Korean: 다이나믹듀오; often stylized as Dynamicduo) is a South Korean hip hop duo that consists of rappers Choiza and Gaeko. They rose to fame with their 2004 debut album, Taxi Driver, which became the best-selling Korean hip hop album ever. They are signed to Amoeba Culture, a hip hop record label that they founded in 2006.

== History ==
Choiza and Gaeko were friends since childhood and debuted in 1999 with the hip hop trio CB Mass. The group released three albums before breaking up in 2003 after it was discovered that CB Mass' third member was stealing money from the trio group.

Dynamic Duo debuted the following year with the album, Taxi Driver. It became the best-selling hip hop album in South Korea, with sales of 50,000 copies in the first month after its release. Their second album, 2005's Double Dynamite, won Best Hip Hop Album at the 2006 Korean Music Awards.

After establishing hip hop record label Amoeba Culture in 2006, Dynamic Duo released their third album, Enlightened, in 2007. That year, they also won Best Music Video at the Mnet Asian Music Awards for their song, "Attendance Check." They released two more albums, 2008's Last Days and 2009's Band of Dynamic Brothers, before both Choiza and Gaeko began their mandatory military service on October 12, 2009. Before being dispatched, both received basic military training at the same camp in Uijeongbu in Gyeonggi Province.

Choiza and Gaeko have also individually produced and recorded their own singles through the 'NOWorkend' project- a series of singles that has come out of their label Amoeba Culture representing songs from the label's artists that shows a completely different side of themselves to their fans.

In 2013, their 7th full-length album titled "Lucky Numbers" was scheduled for release in July. The album featured artists such as Hyolyn of Sistar, Primary, Zion.T, and Supreme Team.

Their 8th album, Grand Carnival was released in November 2015.

== Discography ==
=== Studio albums ===
Title	Album details	Peak chart positions		Sales
Title	Album details	KOR MIAK	KOR Circle	Sales
Taxi Driver	Released: May 17, 2004; Label: Gap Entertainment; Formats: CD, cassette	7	—	KOR: 57,587
Double Dynamite	Released: October 26, 2005; Label: Gap Entertainment; Formats: CD, cassette; Track listing: 1. "Intro"; 2. "Go Back" (featuring Choi Jung-in); 3. "Stop"; 4. "Retire" (featuring Massive tone, DJ Friz); 5. "What's Going On"; 6. "Let's Go" (featuring Sixpoint); 7. "It's Alright" (featuring Brown Eyed Soul, Gary, Jeon Je-deok); 8. "Funk the World" (featuring Lee Juck, Microdot); 9. "F*** You" (featuring Tiger JK, Juvie Train); 10. "Skit"; 11. "서커스" (featuring Dok2, Ro Hong-chul); 12. "Love Is" (featuring Yoon Mi-rae, Kwon Ki-bum); 13. "I Know" (featuring Paloalto); 14. "그림자"; 15. "Bad News Is Coming" (featuring BMK); 16. "덩덕쿵 – Remix" (featuring P-Type, The Quiett); 17. "Sad Cafe" (Fractal Robotic Duo Remix)	—	—	
Enlightened	Released: May 31, 2007; Label: Amoeba Culture; Formats: CD	2	—	KOR: 38,860
Last Days	Released: August 21, 2008; Label: Amoeba Culture; Formats: CD, cassette; Track listing: 1. "Intro 'Last Dayz'"; 2. "Gilmak"; 3. "Solo" (featuring Alex); 4. "Mother's Soulfood" (featuring Ra.D); 5. "Trust Me" (featuring Supreme Team); 6. "On the Beach" (featuring Park Jin-young); 7. "Make Up Sex"; 8. "Want You Back" (featuring 0CD); 9. "Good Love" (featuring Kim Bum-soo); 10. "Don't Say Goodbye" (featuring J); 11. "Give Me the Light"; 12. "Lemmings"; 13. "Father" (featuring Ra.D); 14. "Breath" (featuring Sean2slow)	5	—	KOR: 24,133
Band of Dynamic Brothers	Released: October 7, 2009; Label: Amoeba Culture; Formats: CD, digital download; Track listing: 1. "Dynamic Sinsa Rangers"; 2. "Get Money" (featuring Kang San-eh); 3. "One More Drink" (featuring 0CD); 4. "Keep the Change" (featuring Gary, Bumkey); 5. "Guilty"; 6. "Be My Brownie" (featuring Bumkey); 7. "Biggestmagicalvision"; 8. "FIreworks"; 9. "Sauna" (featuring E-Sens); 10. "Moonstruck" (featuring Simon Dominic); 11. "The Toong Bros" (featuring Topbob); 12. "Ugly"; 13. "Apoptosis"; 14. "Spring Time" (featuring Kim C)	—N/a (Note: The Music Industry Association of Korea ceased publishing its album chart in 2008.)	46	
Dynamic Duo 6th Digilog 1/2	Released: November 25, 2011; Label: Amoeba Culture; Formats: CD, digital download; Track listing: 1. "Digilog Intro"; 2. "Forever Young" (featuring Beenzino); 3. "Girl"; 4. "In the Line of Fire" (featuring Mad Soul Child); 5. "Lost One"; 6. "Sleep Disorder"; 7. "Friday Night"; 8. "Precious Love" (featuring Jinbo); 9. "Great Expectation"	—N/a	6	KOR: 9,961
Dynamic Duo 6th Digilog 2/2	Released: January 4, 2012; Label: Amoeba Culture; Formats: CD, digital download; Track listing: 1. "Go Hard!!"; 2. "Check This Out!!!" (featuring Yankie, Yabul); 3. "Without You"; 4. "Innocent Prisoner"; 5. "Misunderstood" (featuring Simon Dominic, Hangzoo); 6. "Namsan Woman" (featuring UV); 7. "Be..."; 8. "Art of Love"; 9. "Outro"; 10. "Art of Love – Primary Remix"	—N/a	1	KOR: 8,265
Lucky Numbers	Released: July 1, 2013; Label: Amoeba Culture; Formats: CD, digital download; Track listing: 1. "Return of the Kings"; 2. "Three Dopeboyz" (featuring Zion.T); 3. "Skit #1"; 4. "Life Is Good" (featuring Crush, DJ Friz); 5. "Baaam" (featuring Muzie); 6. "Airplane Mode" (featuring Winterplay, Simo); 7. "Lee Dae Ho" (featuring Supreme Team, DJ Friz); 8. "Shoot – Goal In"; 9. "Hot Wings" (featuring Hyolyn); 10. "Good Morning Love"; 11. "Tragedy Part 2"; 12. "Crime Scene" (featuring Jung Jae-il); 13. "Shin Dong Yeop"	—N/a	2	KOR: 11,739
Grand Carnival	Released: November 17, 2015; Label: Amoeba Culture; Formats: CD, digital download; Track listing: 1. "Oksang"; 2. "How You Doin'?" (featuring Dean); 3. "J.O.T.S" (featuring Nafla); 4. "Title Song" (featuring Verbal Jint); 5. "Jam"; 6. "Yayouhwe!" (featuring Zico); 7. "Baby Don't Go" (featuring Lydia Park); 8. "Dodoripyo"; 9. "Juminsingo" (featuring Sway D); 10. "Eat Pray Love"; 11. "Waiting for Exhale"	—N/a	12	KOR: 2,025
Off Duty	Released: November 26, 2019; Label: Amoeba Culture; Formats: CD, digital download; Track listing: 1. "2040" (featuring myunDo); 2. "Desperado"; 3. "Career High" (featuring Paloalto, Nafla, Chancellor); 4. "Blue" (featuring Crush, Sole); 5. "Return" (featuring Thama); 6. "Massacre" (featuring Beelzebub the Killer); 7. "Livin' the Life" (featuring Verbal Jint); 8. "Please Baby Don't"; 9. "MSG" (featuring Penomeco); 10. "GoodFellas" (featuring Swings); 11. "Hemi's Room" (featuring Oh Hyuk); 12. "Flash"	—N/a	33	
2 Kids on the Block	2 Kids on the Block – Part.1: Released: June 23, 2023; Label: Amoeba Culture; Formats: CD, streaming, digital download; Track listing: 1. "Intro" (narrated by Lee Byung-hun); 2. "19"; 3. "All Day"; 4. "Pied Pipers" (featuring DJ Friz)	—N/a	98	KOR: 1,032
2 Kids on the Block	2 Kids on the Block – Part.2: Released: August 28, 2023; Label: Amoeba Culture; Formats: CD, streaming, digital download; Track listing: 1. "Hunt" (featuring Psick University); 2. "Tear Drops"	—N/a	98	KOR: 1,032
2 Kids on the Block	2 Kids on the Block – Part.3: Released: March 28, 2024; Label: Amoeba Culture; Formats: CD, streaming, digital download; Track listing: 1. "911" (featuring Tabber); 2. "Dramatic" (featuring Huh); 3. "Fly or Die" (featuring Crush); 4. "Love Myself" (featuring Bewhy); 5. "Pitapa" (featuring pH-1, Junny)	—N/a	98	KOR: 1,032
"—" denotes album did not chart.

=== Singles ===
Title	Year	Peak chart positions		Sales (DL)	Album
Title	Year	KOR	WW	Sales (DL)	Album
"Resume" (이력서) feat. Lisa	2004	—	—	—N/a	Taxi Driver
"Thinner" (신나? (우리가 누구?)	2004	—	—	—N/a	Taxi Driver
"Insomnia" (불면증) feat. Bobby Kim	2004	—	—	—N/a	Taxi Driver
"Ring My Bell" feat. Naul	2004	—	—	—N/a	Taxi Driver
"Go Back" (고백) feat. Jungin	2005	—	—	—N/a	Double Dynamite
"Fugitive" (도망자)	2006	—	—	—N/a	Non-album single
"Attendance Check" (출첵) feat. Naul	2007	—	—	—N/a	Enlightened
"Heartbreaker" feat. Kim Jong-wan	2007	—	—	—N/a	Non-album single
"Solo" feat. Alex Chu	2008	—	—	—N/a	Last Days
"Gone" feat. Joohee	2008	—	—	—N/a	Non-album singles
"Beyond the Wall" feat. Supreme Team	2009	—	—	—N/a	Non-album singles
"Sorry" (미안해)	2009	—	—	—N/a	Non-album singles
"Guilty" (죽일 놈)	2009	63	—	—N/a	Band of Dynamic Brothers
"Girl" (해뜰때까지만)	2011	4	—	KOR: 972,965	Dynamic Duo 6th Digilog 1/2
"Friday Night" (불타는 금요일)	2011	15	—	KOR: 1,285,969	Dynamic Duo 6th Digilog 1/2
"Without You" (거기서거기)	2012	2	—	KOR: 2,587,845	Dynamic Duo 6th Digilog 2/2
"Baaam" feat. Muzie	2013	1	—	KOR: 1,170,657	Lucky Numbers
"Summer Time" (자리비움)	2014	6	—	KOR: 396,212	Non-album singles
"AEAO" with DJ Premier	2014	11	—	KOR: 338,273	Non-album singles
"SsSs" (싱숭생숭) feat. Lena Park	2014	6	—	KOR: 575,768	Non-album singles
"Only for You" (너 하나만을 위해)	2015	87	—	KOR: 23,338	Two Yoo Project Sugar Man OST
"Jam" (꿀잼)	2015	3	—	KOR: 351,064	Grand Carnival
"Highfive" with Primary	2016	23	—	KOR: 82,045	Non-album single
"Lucky" (좋겠다)	2016	90	—	KOR: 19,375	The Sound of Your Heart OST
"Nosedive" (기다렸다 가) feat. Chen	2017	2	—	KOR: 624,801	Non-album singles
"Bongjeseon" (봉제선) feat. Suran	2018	38	—	—N/a	Non-album singles
"Hemi's Room" (북향) feat. Oh Hyuk	2018	18	—	—N/a	Off Duty
"MSG" (맵고짜고단거) feat. Penomeco	2019	80	—	—N/a	Off Duty
"Flash" (그걸로 됐어)	2019	140	—	—N/a	Off Duty
"You" (혼자) with Chen	2020	105	—	—N/a	Non-album singles
"She Gonna Stop" (시간아 멈춰) featuring Leellamarz	2022	180	—	—N/a	Non-album singles
"AEAO" with DJ Premier	2023	96	—	—N/a	Non-album singles
"Smoke" with Lee Young-ji	2023	2	198	—N/a	Street Woman Fighter2 (SWF2) Class Mission
"Pitapa" (피타파) featuring pH-1 and Junny	2024	—	—	—N/a	2 Kids on the Block
"Take Care"	2025	152	—	—N/a	Non-album single

=== Other charted songs ===
Title	Year	Peak chart positions	Sales (DL)	Album
Title	Year	KOR	Sales (DL)	Album
"Lost One" (막잔하고 나갈게)	2011	34	KOR: 358,504	Dynamic Duo 6th Digilog 1/2
"In the Line of Fire" (사선에서) feat. Mad Soul Child	2011	45	KOR: 322,210	Dynamic Duo 6th Digilog 1/2
"Forever Young" (살발해) feat. Beenzino	2011	52	KOR: 234,567	Dynamic Duo 6th Digilog 1/2
"Sleep Disorder" (수면장애)	2011	54	KOR: 228,535	Dynamic Duo 6th Digilog 1/2
"Precious Love" feat. Jinbo	2011	58	KOR: 208,435	Dynamic Duo 6th Digilog 1/2
"Great Expectation" (남자로서)	2011	68	KOR: 188,776	Dynamic Duo 6th Digilog 1/2
"Digilog Intro"	2011	—	KOR: 59,546	Dynamic Duo 6th Digilog 1/2
"Be..." (참고 살아)	2012	20	KOR: 482,809	Dynamic Duo 6th Digilog 2/2
"Misunderstood" (오해) feat. Simon Dominic, Hangzoo	2012	36	KOR: 259,284	Dynamic Duo 6th Digilog 2/2
"Namsan Woman" (남산워먼) feat. UV	2012	39	KOR: 238,214	Dynamic Duo 6th Digilog 2/2
"Art of Love" (사랑의 미학)	2012	46	KOR: 210,860	Dynamic Duo 6th Digilog 2/2
"Check This Out!!!" (제끼자) feat. Yankie, Yabul	2012	51	KOR: 152,620	Dynamic Duo 6th Digilog 2/2
"Innocent Prisoner" (혹으로 알아)	2012	53	KOR: 153,114	Dynamic Duo 6th Digilog 2/2
"Go Hard!!" (확가게)	2012	56	KOR: 148,977	Dynamic Duo 6th Digilog 2/2
"Art of Love" (사랑의 미학) Primary remix	2012	89	KOR: 67,905	Dynamic Duo 6th Digilog 2/2
"Outro"	2012	—	KOR: 60,601	Dynamic Duo 6th Digilog 2/2
"Three Dopeboyz" (쌔끈해) feat. Zion.T	2013	5	KOR: 499,591	Lucky Numbers
"Hot Wings" (날개뼈) feat. Hyolyn	2013	11	KOR: 471,729	Lucky Numbers
"Life Is Good" (거품 안 넘치게 따라줘) feat. Crush, DJ Friz	2013	12	KOR: 303,914	Lucky Numbers
"Return of the Kings" (진격의 거인 둘)	2013	13	KOR: 280,967	Lucky Numbers
"Lee Dae-ho" (만루홈런) feat. Supreme Team, DJ Friz	2013	18	KOR: 226,290	Lucky Numbers
"Airplane Mode" feat. Lee Joo-han, Hyewon, Simo	2013	27	KOR: 165,188	Lucky Numbers
"Shoot - Goal In" (슛 골인)	2013	30	KOR: 161,942	Lucky Numbers
"Shin Dong-yeop" (가끔씩 오래 보자)	2013	32	KOR: 162,517	Lucky Numbers
"Good Morning Love" (아침사랑)	2013	33	KOR: 153,132	Lucky Numbers
"Tragedy Part 2" (비극 Part 2)	2013	39	KOR: 137,251	Lucky Numbers
"Crime Scene" (범죄야 범죄) feat. Jung Jae-il	2013	40	KOR: 140,707	Lucky Numbers
"Skit #1"	2013	50	KOR: 102,261	Lucky Numbers
"Animal" with DJ Premier	2014	84	KOR: 33,623	Non-album single
"Picnic" (야유회) feat. Zico	2015	23	KOR: 97,964	Grand Carnival
"Give It" (있어줘) feat. Lydia Park	2015	30	KOR: 92,807	Grand Carnival
"Eat and Sleep" (먹고하고자고)	2015	33	KOR: 92,852	Grand Carnival
"If Winter Comes" (겨울이오면)	2015	36	KOR: 79,016	Grand Carnival
"How You Doing?" (요즘어때?) feat. Dean	2015	38	KOR: 72,826	Grand Carnival
"Title Track" (타이틀곡) feat. Verbal Jint	2015	41	KOR: 62,847	Grand Carnival
"On The Roof" (옥상에서)	2015	55	KOR: 36,469	Grand Carnival
"J.O.T.S." feat. Nafla	2015	63	KOR: 35,099	Grand Carnival
"Dodolipyo" (도돌이표)	2015	80	KOR: 29,671	Grand Carnival
"Residents Reported" (주민신고) feat. Sway D	2015	—	KOR: 23,932	Grand Carnival
"—" denotes releases that did not chart.

== Awards and nominations ==
Name of the award ceremony, year presented, category, nominee(s) of the award, and the result of the nomination
Award ceremony	Year	Category	Nominee / work	Result	Ref.
Asia Artist Awards	2016	Best Choice Award	Dynamic Duo	Won	
KBS Entertainment Awards	2022	Rookie Award in Show and Variety Category	Listen-Up	Nominated	
Gaon Chart Music Awards	2018	Song of the Year – January	"Nosedive" (with Chen)	Nominated	
Golden Disk Awards	2007	Hip Hop Award	"Attendance Check" (출첵)	Won	
Melon Music Awards	2012	Top Ten Artists	Dynamic Duo	Nominated	
Melon Music Awards	2012	Best Rap/Hip Hop	"Without You"	Won	
Melon Music Awards	2013	Artist of the Year	Dynamic Duo	Nominated	
Melon Music Awards	2013	Top Ten Artists	Dynamic Duo	Won	
Melon Music Awards	2013	Album of the Year	Lucky Numbers	Nominated	
Melon Music Awards	2017	Best Rap/Hip Hop	"Nosedive" (with Chen)	Won	
Mnet Asian Music Awards	2004	Best Hip Hop Video	"Ring My Bell"	Nominated	
Mnet Asian Music Awards	2006	Best Hip Hop Video	"Go Back"	Nominated	
Mnet Asian Music Awards	2006	Best Music Video	"Go Back"	Nominated	
Mnet Asian Music Awards	2007	Best Music Video	"Attendance Check" (출첵)	Won	
Mnet Asian Music Awards	2007	Best Music Video	"Complex"	Nominated	
Mnet Asian Music Awards	2007	Best Hip Hop Performance	"Attendance Check" (출첵)	Nominated	
Mnet Asian Music Awards	2008	Best Music Video	"Solo"	Nominated	
Mnet Asian Music Awards	2008	Best Hip Hop Performance	"Solo"	Nominated	
Mnet Asian Music Awards	2009	Best Hip Hop Performance	"Guilty"	Nominated	
Mnet Asian Music Awards	2013	Best Rap Performance	"BAAAM"	Won	
Mnet Asian Music Awards	2017	Best Collaboration	"Nosedive"(with Chen)	Won	
Seoul Music Awards	2024	Best Rap/Hip Hop	"Smoke"	Won	
