= Enlightened (album) =

Studio album by Dynamic Duo
- Released: May 28, 2007
- Genre: K-pop, Hip hop
- Language: Korean
- Label: CJ Music

Enlightened is a 2007 album by Dynamic Duo. This is Dynamic Duo's third album and was released on Compact Disc. This album features many guest artists, including YDG, Kero One and Brown Eye Soul's Na Ul, among others.

== Track listing ==
1. 다시 쓰는 이력서
2. 해적 (Feat.YDG)
3. Dream (Feat. 바다, Bada)
4. 그래서 난 미쳤다 (Feat. 박정은, Dave Lopez For Flipsyde)
5. 지구본 뮤직 (Feat. Kero One)
6. 동전 한 닢
7. 절망하지 맙시다 (Interlude)
8. 절망하지 맙시다 (Feat. 아롬 For Bubble Sisters)
9. 출첵 (Feat. 나얼 Of Brown Eyed Soul)
10. 살인자의 몽타주
11. 독재자 (Feat.Sixpoint)
12. Happy Day (Feat. Heritage)
13. 복잡해
14. 그 남자 그 여자의 사정 (Feat. Bobby Kim)
15. U-turn (Feat. Verbal Jint)
