= Slave contract =

Unfair long-term contract between Korean idols and their agencies

- Hangul: 노예 계약
- Hanja: 奴隷契約
- RR: noye gyeyak
- MR: noye kyeyak

A slave contract (Korean: 노예 계약) refers to an unfair, long-term contract between Korean entertainers and their management agencies.

== Conditions ==
Aspiring K-pop idols, known as "trainees," sign contracts with management agencies when the trainee is as young as 12 or 13 years old. It may take ten years for an agency to groom the trainee and for them to debut on stage, according to the former head of the Korea Entertainment Law Society. Both trainees and K-pop idols who have debuted typically live in dormitories, where their management agencies control their diets, their love lives, and their behavior. Under most contracts, trainees and K-pop idols are required to pay back their management agencies for the cost of singing and dancing lessons, their wardrobes and living costs, among other things. As a result, K-pop idols may not make large profits.

Many K-pop groups often take years to break even, and thus do not receive their share of any profits made from their songs until their trainee debt is paid off.

The unfair treatment of K-pop singers and trainees has been prominent in the Korean music industry. As a result, agencies including SM, FNC, and DSP were told by the FTC of South Korea to stop canceling trainee contracts on dubious grounds, such as morality clauses. Nonetheless, many pressing issues have yet to be addressed by the FTC of South Korea, one of which is the mistreatment from the South Korean entertainment agencies, which are manifested in draconian and non-standardized contracts. These contracts often create manufactured and controlled identities, in order to maintain a façade of a "supremely talented and gorgeous, single, heterosexual star, seemingly accessible to fans of the opposite sex". Two successful idols who signed with Cube Entertainment were dropped from the company due to being involved in romantic relationships. In addition, both male and female idols are expected to achieve and maintain an unhealthily slim figure in order to even be considered for applying to trainee programs.

== Reforms ==
In 2009, three members of the boy band TVXQ took their management agency SM Entertainment to court, claiming that the agency's 13-year-contract was too long, too restrictive, and gave them almost none of the profits from their success. The following year, in 2010, South Korea's Fair Trade Commission (KFTC) created a rule that limited entertainment contracts to seven years. In 2017, the KFTC again put restrictions on entertainment contracts following the lawsuit involving traditional folk singer Song Sohee. Among other things, the 2017 reforms reduced the financial penalties for entertainers that break their contracts early and made it more difficult for companies to force entertainers to renew their contracts.
