= Zion.T =

South Korean singer (born 1989)

Zion.T 자이언티
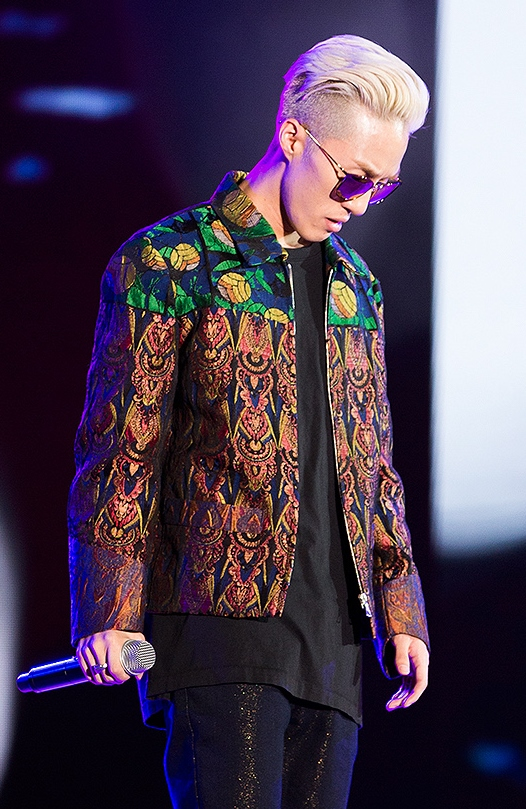
- Zion.T at the MBC Radio DJ Concert in September 2015

Background information
- Born: Kim Hae-sol; April 13, 1989 (age 37); South Korea
- Genres: Hip hop; R&B; synthpop
- Occupations: Singer; songwriter
- Years active: 2011–present
- Labels: Amoeba Culture; The Black Label; Standard Friends

- Zion.T
- Hangul: 김해솔
- RR: Gim Haesol
- MR: Kim Haesol

Kim Hae-sol (Korean: 김해솔; born April 13, 1989), known professionally as Zion.T (자이언티), is a South Korean hip hop and R&B singer-songwriter. He has released 2 studio albums, Red Light (2013) and Zip (2023), as well as 3 EPs. He has also been featured on tracks by K-pop artists such as G-Dragon, Zico, and Psy.

== Personal life ==
In a 2014 interview, Zion.T explained that he chose his stage name because "I am a Christian and so the "T" in my name is representative of the cross."

In a 2017 interview, he said he was influenced by the American musician T-Pain. "There was a time when T-Pain's style of hip hop vocals were in. I really like T-Pain, so I used to emulate him a lot. This is something only my friends know, but I even had the nickname 'Zion.T-Pain'."

On April 5, 2024, JYP Entertainment confirmed that Zion.T was in a relationship with Twice member, Chaeyoung.

== Career ==
Zion.T made his musical debut in 2011, collaborating with Korean hip hop artists such as Dok2, Crucial Star, Simon D, Primary and Gray. His first single, "Click Me", featuring Dok2, was released in April 2011.

On April 9, 2013, Zion.T's first studio album, Red Light, was released with the title track "Babay", featuring Gaeko.

That year, he featured on tracks by Infinite H, Dynamic Duo, Swings and G-Dragon. In December, he released the EP Mirrorball ("미러볼") with the title track "Miss Kim" (미스 김).

In 2014, he released the digital single "Yanghwa BRDG", which became a hit and contributed to his rising mainstream success as an artist in Korea.

He also appeared on the soundtrack of the television drama series Pinocchio with the song "Kiss Me", and featured on songs by Seo In-young and The Quiett.

On February 1, 2015, he collaborated with the Korean R&B singer Crush on the single "Just" (그냥). The same year, he released the digital singles "Zero Gravity" (무중력), "Eat" (꺼내 먹어요) and "No Make Up" (노메이크업) and featured on singles by SHINee's Jonghyun, Yankie and Psy. That July, he participated in the biennial music festival event hosted by the MBC variety show Infinite Challenge, which resulted in a spike in domestic sales of his previously released singles. For the event, he partnered with the Infinite Challenge cast member Haha to perform under the name Eutteugeottasi (으뜨거따시) with the song "$ponsor", later released in an album of the songs performed at the event.

Zion.T finished the year with two wins at the annual Mnet Asian Music Awards: Best Vocal Performance (Male) for "Eat " 꺼내먹어요 and Best Collaboration, with Crush, for the song "Just" 그냥, beating more well-established artistes in an idol-focused industry.

In 2016, following the end of his contract with the hip hop label Amoeba Culture, he signed with The Black Label, a sub-label of YG Entertainment. On February 1, 2017, he released his first EP under The Black Label, OO.

In December 2017, he released his collaboration with the veteran singer Lee Moon-se, the song "Snow". It topped all major music charts in South Korea. Lee Moon-se said he listened to Zion.T's song more than 200 times to faithfully represent his song, and showed great affection towards Zion.T and his musical career.

In August 2022, Zion.T established his own entertainment company, Standard Friends, and signed Wonstein as his first artist. He will still be represented by The Black Label as a singer.

== Discography ==
Studio albums

- Red Light (2013)
- Zip (2023)

== Filmography ==
=== Television shows ===
Year	Title		Network	Role	Notes	Ref.
Year	English	Korean	Network	Role	Notes	Ref.
2016	Show Me the Money 5	쇼미더머니 5	Mnet	Producer	with Kush	
2017–2018	Mix Nine	믹스나인	JTBC	Judge		
2018	Hidden Singer	히든 싱어	JTBC	Participant	(Season 5; Episode 11)	
2019	My Major is Hip Hop	내 전공은 힙합	V Live; YouTube	Cast Member	with Mino	
2019	Sign Here	사인히어	MBN	Judge	Episode 5	
2020	Song Farm!	곡FARM!	Mnet	Producer		
2020	Show Me the Money 9	쇼미더머니 9	Mnet	Producer	with Giriboy	
2021	Show Me the Money 10	쇼미더머니 10	Mnet	Producer	with Slom	

== Accolades ==
=== Awards and nominations ===
Year presented, name of the award ceremony, category, nominated work, and the result of the nomination
Year	Award	Category	Nominated work	Result
2014	11th Korean Music Awards	Best R&B & Soul Album	Red Light	Won
2015	7th MelOn Music Awards	Top 10 Artists	—N/a	Won
2015	7th MelOn Music Awards	Artist of the Year	—N/a	Nominated
2015	17th Mnet Asian Music Awards	Best Male Artist	—N/a	Nominated
2015	17th Mnet Asian Music Awards	Artist of the Year	—N/a	Nominated
2015	17th Mnet Asian Music Awards	Best Vocal Performance - Male	"Eat" (꺼내 먹어요) - Zion.T	Won
2015	17th Mnet Asian Music Awards	Song of the Year	"Eat" (꺼내 먹어요) - Zion.T	Nominated
2015	17th Mnet Asian Music Awards	Song of the Year	"Just" (그냥) - Zion.T X Crush	Nominated
2015	17th Mnet Asian Music Awards	Best Collaboration & Unit	"Just" (그냥) - Zion.T X Crush	Won
2016	25th Seoul Music Awards	Bonsang Award	—N/a	Won
2016	25th Seoul Music Awards	Popularity Award	—N/a	Nominated
2016	25th Seoul Music Awards	Hallyu Special Award	—N/a	Nominated
2016	30th Golden Disk Awards	Digital Daesang	"Eat" (꺼내 먹어요) - Zion.T	Nominated
2016	30th Golden Disk Awards	Digital Bonsang	"Eat" (꺼내 먹어요) - Zion.T	Won
2016	30th Golden Disk Awards	Popularity Award	—N/a	Nominated
2016	30th Golden Disk Awards	Global Popularity Award	—N/a	Nominated
2016	5th Gaon Chart Music Awards	R&B Discovery of the Year	—N/a	Won
2017	19th Mnet Asian Music Awards	Best Male Artist	—N/a	Nominated
2017	19th Mnet Asian Music Awards	Best Vocal Performance - Male	"The Song" (노래) - Zion.T	Nominated
2017	9th MelOn Music Awards	Album of the Year	OO	Nominated
2017	9th MelOn Music Awards	Top 10 Artists	—N/a	Nominated
2017	9th MelOn Music Awards	Best R&B/Soul Award	"The Song" (노래) - Zion.T	Nominated
2018	32nd Golden Disk Awards	Digital Bonsang	"The Song" (노래) - Zion.T	Nominated
2018	32nd Golden Disk Awards	Global Popularity Award	—N/a	Nominated
2018	27th Seoul Music Awards	Bonsang Award	—N/a	Nominated
2018	27th Seoul Music Awards	Popularity Award	—N/a	Nominated
2018	27th Seoul Music Awards	Hallyu Special Award	—N/a	Nominated
2018	7th Gaon Chart Music Awards	Song of the Year – February	"The Song" (노래) - Zion.T	Nominated
2018	7th Gaon Chart Music Awards	Song of the Year – December	"Snow" (눈) (feat. Lee Moon-se)	Nominated

=== Listicles ===
Name of publisher, year listed, name of listicle, and placement
Publisher	Year	Listicle	Placement	Ref.
Forbes	2016	Korea Power Celebrity	35th	
