= Simon Dominic =

South Korean rapper

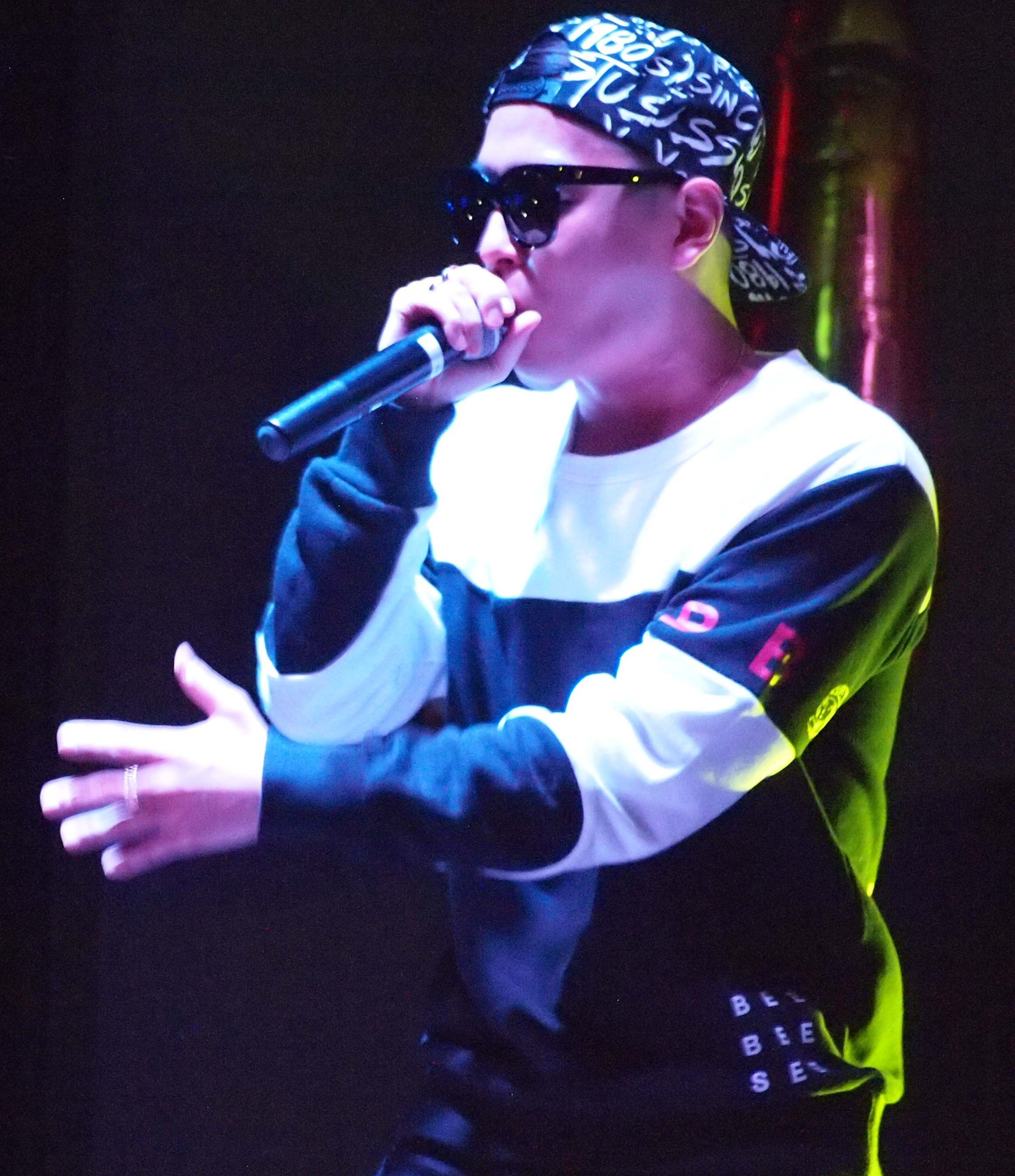
- Simon Dominic at 2014 AOMG United States Tour

Background information
- Also known as: Simon D, K-OUTA, Ssam D
- Born: Jung Ki-suck; 9 March 1984 (age 42); Busan, South Korea
- Genre: Hip hop
- Occupation: Rapper
- Years active: 2007–present
- Labels: Amoeba Culture; AOMG
- Formerly of: Supreme Team

Korean name
- Hangul: 정기석
- Hanja: 鄭基石
- RR: Jeong Giseok
- MR: Chŏng Kisŏk

Jung Ki-suck (Korean: 정기석; born 9 March 1984), better known by his stage name Simon Dominic (Korean: 사이먼 도미닉), is a South Korean rapper. He debuted in 2009 as a member of the hip-hop duo Supreme Team, which disbanded in 2013. As a solo artist, he has released two studio albums: Simon Dominic Presents: SNL League Begins (2011) and Darkroom (2018), and two extended plays: Won & Only (2015) and No Open Flames (2019).

In addition to rapping, Simon Dominic was the co-CEO of hip hop record label AOMG from 2014 to 2018. He was also a cast member on South Korean variety shows, including Show Me the Money 5 (2016) and I Live Alone (2018).

== Career ==
Simon Dominic began rapping in the underground Korean hip hop scene in the early 2000s, using the stage name K-OUTA. He later changed his stage name, which is a combination of "Simon," Wesley Snipes' character in the movie Demolition Man, and "Dominic," his baptismal name.

He and rapper E Sens formed the hip hop duo Supreme Team in 2009. The group broke into the South Korean mainstream and won several major awards during their career, including Best New Male Group at the 2009 Mnet Asian Music Awards, and the Hip Hop Award at the 2010 Golden Disc Awards.

In 2011, Simon Dominic released his first solo album, Simon Dominic Presents: SNL League Begins. The album peaked at #2 on the Gaon Album Chart.

In 2013, Supreme Team disbanded, and Simon Dominic left his label, Amoeba Culture. The following year, he became co-CEO of hip hop artist Jay Park's new record label AOMG.

Simon Dominic released his first extended play, Won & Only, in 2015. The album's first single, "Simon Dominic," achieved an "all-kill," meaning that it reached #1 on all of South Korea's major real-time music charts. The single peaked at #2 on the weekly Gaon Digital Chart.

In 2016, he appeared on the rap competition TV show Show Me the Money 5 as a judge and producer alongside fellow AOMG artist Gray. Their team member, rapper Bewhy, was the show's winner.

In 2018, Simon Dominic released his second full-length album, Darkroom. Soon after, he resigned as co-CEO of AOMG, but remained signed to the label as a rapper.

In August 2024, AOMG announced that his exclusive contract ended on July 29, 2024.

== Philanthropy ==
On September 8, 2022, he donated ₩100 million to help those recovering damage from Typhoon Hin Nam Noh through The Hope Bridge Korea Disaster Relief Association.

== Discography ==
=== Studio albums ===
Title	Album details	Peak chart positions	Sales
Title	Album details	KOR	Sales
Simon Dominic Presents 'SNL League Begins'	Released: 7 October 2011; Label: Amoeba Culture; Format: CD, digital download	2	KOR: 5,115+
Darkroom	Released: 15 June 2018; Label: AOMG; Format: CD, digital download	30	KOR: 2,705+
"—" denotes release did not chart.

=== Extended play ===
Title	Album details	Peak chart positions	Sales
Title	Album details	KOR	Sales
No Open Flames (화기엄금)	Released: 3 September 2019; Label: AOMG; Format: Vinyl, digital download	—	—N/a
"—" denotes release did not chart.

=== Maxi single ===
Title	Album details	Peak chart positions
Title	Album details	KOR
Won & Only (₩ & Only)	Released: 21 August 2015; Label: AOMG; Format: CD, digital download	—
"—" denotes release did not chart.

=== Singles ===
Title	Year	Peak chart positions	Sales	Album
Title	Year	KOR	Sales	Album
As lead artist
"Lonely Night"	2007	No data	No data	Non-album single
"Hero"	2011	28	KOR: 291,474+	SNL League Begins
"Stay Cool" feat. Zion.T	2011	22	KOR: 404,176+	SNL League Begins
"Cheerz" (짠해)	2011	10	KOR: 1,135,298+	SNL League Begins
"Simon Dominic"	2015	2	KOR: 786,923+	Won & Only
"Won & Only" (₩ & Only) feat. Jay Park	2015	32	KOR: 129,014+	Won & Only
"Me No Jay Park"	2018	65	No data	Darkroom
"Simon Says" (왈) feat. Pharoahe Monch	2018	97	No data	Non-album singles
"DAx4"	2019	167	No data	No Open Flames.
"Make Her Dance" (feat. Loopy and Crush)	2019	86	No data	No Open Flames.
"GOTT" (feat. Moon, Woo Won-jae and Jvcki Wai)	2019	88	No data	No Open Flames.
"Party Forever"	2021	117	No data	Non-album single
Collaborations
"6:30" (여섯시 반) with Lady Jane	2012	24	KOR: 286,133+	Non-album singles
"난리good (AIR)" with Gaeko, Choiza, Primary	2012	35	KOR: 159,508+	Non-album singles
"I'm Not the Person You Used to Know" with One, G2, Bewhy	2016	2	KOR: 751,667+	Show Me the Money 5
"Comfortable" (맘 편히) with Gray, One	2016	1	KOR: 750,349+	Show Me the Money 5
"XamBaqJa" (쌈박자) with Bewhy	2016	29	KOR: 110,830+	Show Me the Money 5
"Upside Down" (뒤집어버려) with Jay Park, Loco, Gray	2018	89	No data	Non-album single
"I'mma Do" (아마두) with Yumdda, Deepflow, Paloalto, The Quiett feat. Woo Won-jae, Keem Hyo-eun, Nucksal, Huckleberry P	2019	2	No data	Dingo X DAMOIM (Part 2)
"Journey to Atlantis" (상상더하기) with MSG Wannabe	2021	7	No data	MSG Wannabe Top 8 Performance Songs
"Resignation" (체념) with Kim Jung-min, Lee Dong-hwi, Lee Sang-yi	2021	16	No data	MSG Wannabe Top 8 Performance Songs
"Only You" (나를 아는 사람) with Kim Jung-min, Lee Dong-hwi, Lee Sang-yi	2021	2	No data	MSG Wannabe 1st Album
"I Love You" (난 너를 사랑해) (with MSG Wannabe)	2021	25	No data	MSG Wannabe 1st Album
"TTFU" (with Loco, Woo Won-jae and Coogie)	2022	178	No data	Non-album single
As a featured artist
"The Triumph" Loptimist feat. Simon Dominic	2007	No data	No data	22 Channels
"Thank U" Tony An feat. Simon Dominic	2011	69	KOR: 122,438+	Top Star
"Metronome" Jay Park feat. Simon Dominic, Gray	2014	28	KOR: 124,353+	Evolution
"Day N Night" Huh Gak feat. Simon Dominic	2014	9	KOR: 195,812+	Non-album single
"Heartbreak Hotel" Tiffany feat. Simon Dominic	2016	84	KOR: 29,145+	Non-album single
"Hyung" (형) Dumbfoundead feat. Simon Dominic, Dok2, Tiger JK	2017	—	—N/a	Foreigner
"Soju Remix" Jay Park feat. Simon Dominic, Changmo, Woodie Gochild	2018	—	No data	Non-album single
"NoNo" Loopy feat. Simon Dominic	2018	18	No data	Show Me the Money 777
"6 'O Clock" Well feat. Simon Dominic	2018	—	No data	Non-album single
"Waves" Kang Daniel feat. Simon Dominic, Jamie	2020	102	No data	Magenta
"—" denotes release did not chart.

== Filmography ==
=== Television shows ===
Year	Title	Role	Notes	Ref.
2010–2011	Hot Brothers (뜨거운 형제들)	Cast member		
2016	Show Me the Money 5	Judge and producer		
2018	I Live Alone	Cast member		
2019	Sign Here	Judge		
2021	The Masked Talent	Judge	MBC Chuseok's special	
2022	Around the World at Birth	Panelist / Host	with Song Min-ho and Jang Do-yeon	

=== Web shows ===
Year	Title	Role	Notes	Ref.
2021–2024	EXchange	Panelist	Season 1–3	

=== Music video appearances ===
Year	Song Title	Artist	Ref.
2021	"Only You + Foolish Love" (나를 아는 사람'을 '바라만 본다)	MSG Wannabe	
2021	"Lipstick"	Lee Hi (feat. Yoon Mirae)	
2022	"Do You Want to Hear" (듣고 싶을까)	MSG Wannabe M.O.M	

== Awards and nominations ==
Year presented, name of the award ceremony, category, nominated work, and the result of the nomination
Year	Award	Category	Nominated work	Result	Ref.
2010	MBC Entertainment Awards	Popularity Award	Hot Brothers	Won	
2011	13th Mnet Asian Music Awards	Best Rap Performance	"Cheerz"	Nominated	
2018	Korean Popular Music Awards	Hip Hop Award	—N/a	Won	
2021	MBC Entertainment Awards	Best Teamwork Awards	Hangout with Yoo	Won	
