= Taxi Driver (Dynamic Duo album) =

Studio album by Dynamic Duo
- Released: May 17, 2004
- Genre: K-pop, hip hop
- Language: Korean
- Label: EMI Music Korea Ltd

Taxi Driver is the first album by Dynamic Duo, released in 2004. The album features guest vocals from Brown Eyed Soul, Drunken Tiger, TBNY, Lisa, Bobby Kim, Eun Ji Won, Epik High, Asoto Union and other Korean artists.

== Track listing ==
1. 이력서
2. Taxi Driver Interlude 1
3. 두남자 (feat. Brown Eyed Soul)
4. 실례합니다 (feat. DJ Wreckx, Tablo)
5. Pride (feat. The Name, Double K, Verbal Jint)
6. Taxidriver interlude 2
7. 신나? (우리가 누구?) feat. lisa
8. Skit
9. 사랑하면 버려야 할 아까운 것들 feat. Sung Hoon of Brown Eyed Soul
10. Superstar (behind the Scene) feat. Tiger JK, Sean2slow, DJ Tukutz
11. 비극 Part 1 feat. k.o.d
12. 무인도 feat. lazy
13. 불면증 feat. Bobby Kim
14. Ring My Bell feat. Naul of Brown eyed soul
15. 우리는 바보 (Shake ya 엉덩 to da 이)
16. My World feat. Yankie of TBNY
17. Outro
18. Candy[Hidden Track](feat. Brown Eyed Soul)
