= Choiza =

South Korean hip hop artist

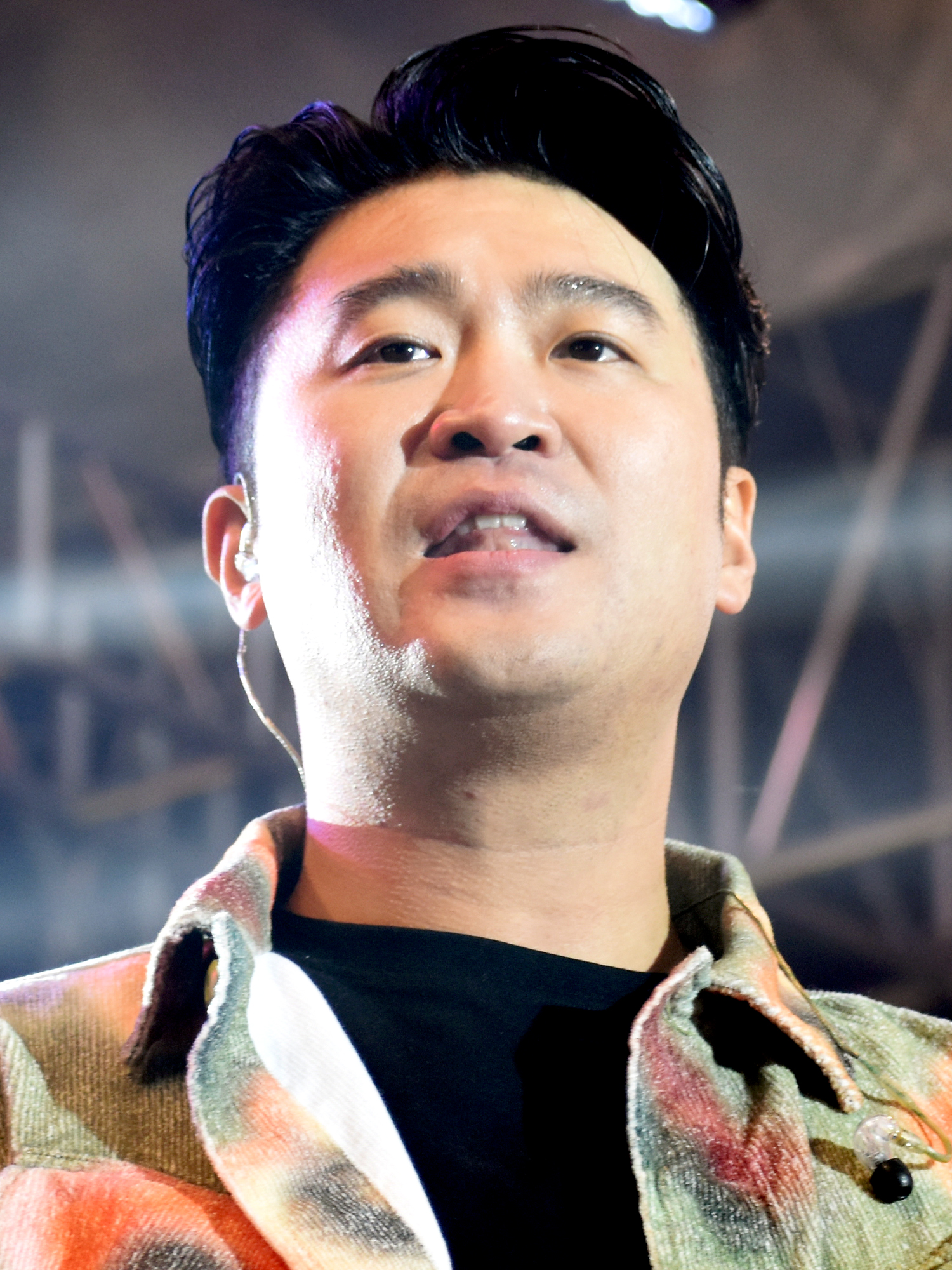
- Choiza at the Itaewon Global Village Festival, October 2018
- Born: Choi Jae-ho; March 17, 1980 (age 46); Seoul, South Korea
- Occupation: Rapper
- Years active: 1999–present
- Spouse: Kim Ji-hye (m. 2023)
- Children: 1
- Musical career
- Genre: Hip hop
- Label: Amoeba Culture
- Member of: Dynamic Duo
- Formerly of: CB Mass

Korean name
- Hangul: 최재호
- RR: Choe Jaeho
- MR: Ch'oe Chaeho

Choi Jae-ho (Korean: 최재호; born March 17, 1980), known professionally as Choiza (Korean: 최자), is a South Korean hip hop recording artist. He and Gaeko comprise the hip hop duo Dynamic Duo, which rose to fame upon the release of their debut album Taxi Driver in 2004. In 2006, he co-founded the South Korean record label Amoeba Culture. He was previously a member of the hip hop trio CB Mass.

== Personal life ==
On September 25, 2013, Choiza and Sulli were rumored to be dating after pictures of them surfaced on the Internet. He later confirmed it on August 19, 2014, as other pictures of them on a date surfaced on the internet. The two ended their relationship in March 2017. Both celebrities endured malicious comments and cyberbullying throughout their public relationship, and after Sulli's death in 2019.

Following Sulli's death, Choiza received malicious comments and was blamed by netizens for her death. The cyberbullying continued after he shared a farewell message to Sulli on Instagram, forcing him to disable the comments on his account.

On February 17, 2023, Choiza announced his upcoming marriage with his non-celebrity girlfriend in July, after three years of dating. The couple married on July 9, in a private ceremony. On July 11, 2024, Choi announced that the couple is expecting their first child. The couple welcomed their first child, a daughter, on November 22.

== Discography ==
=== Singles ===
Title	Year	Peak chart positions	Sales	Album
Title	Year	KOR	Sales	Album
"난리 Good (AIR)" with Gaeko, Simon Dominic, Primary	2012	35	KOR: 159,508+	Non-album single
"없어"	2013	26	KOR: 132,405+	NOWorkend Project
"Let's Play House" (몸만와) with Primary, feat. Crush	2016	—	—N/a	Hobby single album
"Hit" with Microdot	2018	—	—N/a	Non-album single
"Mr. Real" with Yoon Jong-shin	2018	—	—N/a	2018 Monthly Yoon Jong-shin: August
"—" denotes release did not chart.
