= Gaeko =

South Korean hip hop artist (born 1981)

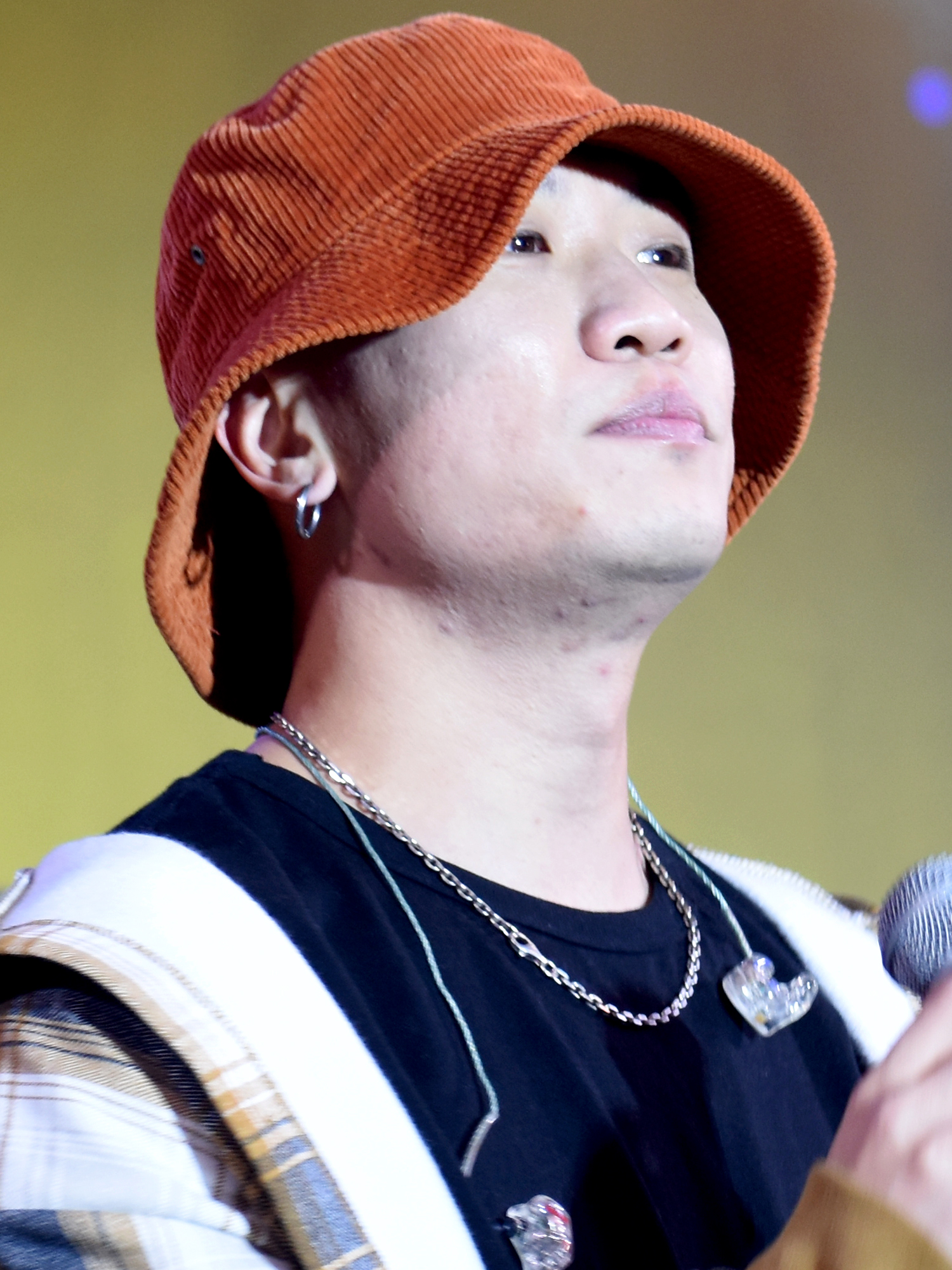
- Gaeko at the Itaewon Global Village Festival, October 2018
- Born: Kim Yoon-sung; January 14, 1981 (age 45); Seoul, South Korea
- Spouse: Kim Soo-mi (m. 2011; div. 2026)
- Children: 2
- Musical career
- Genres: Hip hop
- Occupations: Rapper; singer
- Years active: 1999–present
- Label: Amoeba Culture

Korean name
- Hangul: 김윤성
- RR: Gim Yunseong
- MR: Kim Yunsŏng

Stage name
- Hangul: 개코
- RR: Gaeko
- MR: Kaek'o
- Website: Gaeko on Instagram

Kim Yoon-sung (Korean: 김윤성; born January 14, 1981), known professionally as Gaeko (개코; lit. 'dog's snout') is a South Korean hip hop recording artist. He and Choiza comprise the hip hop duo Dynamic Duo, which rose to fame upon the release of their debut album Taxi Driver in 2004. In 2015, he released his first solo album, Redingray.

== Personal life ==
On May 14, 2011, in the middle of his mandatory military service, he married Kim Su-mi before returning to serve the rest of his term. The couple had a son, Tae-woo, in 2011 and a daughter, Seo-ah, in 2015.

== Discography ==
=== Studio albums ===
| Title | Album details | Peak chart positions | Sales |
| Title | Album details | KOR | Sales |
|---|---|---|---|
| Redingray | Released: October 16, 2014; Label: Amoeba Culture; Formats: CD, digital download; Track listing: 1. "Rhythm is life" 2. "Passout" (featuring Bumkey); 3. "Seoul Blues Part3" (featuring Choiza, DJ Soulscape & Juhan Lee); 4. "East"; 5. "Chaser the Rapper Part1"; 6. "Oh My God" (featuring DJ Friz); 7. "No Make Up" (featuring Zion.T, HA:TFELT); 8. "Interlude by Simo"; 9. "Silver Sonata" (featuring Crush); 10. "Snapper Ending"; 11. "Mr. Vengeance Part2 (featuring Choiza, Yankie, Hangzoo, Geegooin); 12. "Chaser the Rapper Part2"; 13. "Hueng Hai" (featuring Ailee); 14. "Festival Virgin"; 15. "Rose"; 16. "Shame"; 17. "Snapper Ending Remix" (featuring Dok2) | 11 | KOR: 3,170 |

=== Singles ===
==== As lead artist ====
| Title | Year | Peak chart positions | Sales | Album |
| Title | Year | KOR | Sales | Album |
|---|---|---|---|---|
| "난리 Good (AIR)" with Choiza, Simon Dominic, Primary | 2012 | 35 | KOR: 159,508 | Non-album singles |
| "Rhythm Is Life (Feeling So Good)" (될 대로 되라고 해 (느낌 So Good)) | 2013 | 11 | | Non-album singles |
| "No Make Up" (화장 지웠어) feat. Zion.T, Ha:tfelt | 2014 | 2 | | Redingray |
| "Rose" (장미꽃) | 2014 | 41 | | Redingray |
| "Cheers" with Yankie, feat. Beenzino, Babylon | 2015 | 28 | | Non-album single |
| "Empty City" with Yoon Jong-shin | 2016 | — | | 2016 Yoon Jong-shin Monthly Project: July |
| "Your Night" (당신의 밤) with Hwang Kwanghee feat. Oh Hyuk | 2016 | 1 | | Infinite Challenge Great Legacy |
| "Gajah" (코끼리) feat. RM | 2017 | 17 | | Non-album single |
| "Vacation" feat. SOLE | 2018 | 96 | | Non-album single |
| "Sunbbang (Prod. Giriboy)" with Nafla and Giriboy | 2018 | 89 | | Show Me The Money 777 Semi Final |
| "119 Remix" Various Artists | 2018 | — (Note: "119 Remix" did not enter the Circle Digital Chart, but it peaked at number 47 on the component Download Chart.) | | Non-album single |
| "How Do You Play?" (놀면 뭐해?) with Boi B, Wonstein, Choiza, Geegooin, Gray, Crush, Mommy Son, Zior Park, and Sam Kim | 2019 | 62 | | Yoo-plash |
| "Cold" (바빠서) feat. Heize | 2020 | 40 | | Non-album singles |
| "Pass Out" with Nitti Gritti and Kaku | 2020 | — | | Non-album singles |
| "I Feel Like" (마음이 그래) with Kwon Jin-ah | 2021 | 40 | | Non-album singles |
| "Fast" with Coogie | 2021 | — | | Non-album singles |
| "Cheap Talk" (논해) | 2021 | — | | Non-album singles |
| "Wake Up (Prod. Code Kunst)" with Ourealgoat, Since, Ahn Byeongwoong, Code Kunst, Gwangil Jo, Pick!, Tabber | 2021 | 23 | | Show Me The Money 10 Episode 1 |
| "Thorn (Prod. Code Kunst)" (가시) Jo Gwang-il and Justhis | 2021 | 22 | | Show Me The Money 10 Episode 2 |
| "Do Gae Bee (Prod. D.O)" (도깨비) with D.O and Superbee | 2022 | — (Note: "Do Gae Bee" didn't chart on the Circle Digital Chart but debuted and peaked at number 84 on the component download chart.) | | D.O.P.E. |
| "Dawn do that" (새벽을 믿지 말자) with Davichi | 2022 | — (Note: "Dawn do that" didn't chart on the Circle Digital Chart but debuted and peaked at number 17 on the component download chart.) | | Non-album singles |
| "Pep (Prod. Padi)" with Boi B feat. Jung Sangsoo | 2022 | — | | Non-album singles |
| "Little Treasure" with Sumi | 2022 | — | | Non-album singles |

==== As featured artist ====
| Title | Year | Peak chart positions | Album |
| Title | Year | KOR | Album |
|---|---|---|---|
| "Fold My Hands" (깍지껴요) Alex feat. Gaeko | 2008 | — | My Vintage Romance |
| "Serenade" Leessang feat. Gaeko and Windy City | 2011 | 11 | Asura Balbalta |
| "See Through" (씨스루) Primary feat. Gaeko and Zion.T | 2012 | 20 | Primary And The Messengers |
| "You Don't Deserve Her" (아까워) Epik High feat. Gaeko | 2012 | 32 | 99 |
| "Babay" Zion.T feat. Gaeko | 2013 | 9 | Red Light |
| "Hug Me" Crush feat. Gaeko | 2014 | 10 | Crush on You |
| "Burj Khalifa" (부르즈 할리파) Epik High feat. Gaeko and Yankie | 2014 | 8 | Shoebox |
| "eTunnel" Primary feat. Oh Hyuk and Gaeko | 2015 | 80 | Lucky You! |
| "See You" (조만간 봐요) Primary feat. BSK and Gaeko | 2015 | 7 | 2 |
| "Paranoia" (피해망상) Primary feat. Sunwoo Jung-a, and Gaeko | 2015 | — | 2 |
| "Who Are You" BoA feat. Gaeko | 2015 | 3 | Kiss My Lips |
| "Life" Jay Park feat. Paloalto, Gaeko and DJ Wegun | 2015 | — | ₩orld ₩ide |
| "Ahjussi Swag" (아저씨SWAG) Psy feat. Gaeko | 2015 | 17 | Chiljip Psy-da |
| "9 to 5" Crush feat. Gaeko | 2016 | 59 | Interlude |
| "D (Half Moon)" Dean feat. Gaeko | 2016 | 15 | 130 Mood: TRBL |
| "Ring Ring" Sik-K feat. Gaeko | 2016 | — | H.A.L.F (Have.A.Little.Fun |
| "Where Am I" BewhY feat. Gaeko | 2017 | — | The Blind Star |
| "Jenga" Heize feat. Gaeko | 2018 | 3 | Wind |
| "O.F.F" Penomeco feat. Gaeko | 2018 | — | Breakers Part 2 |
| "Down For U" Thama feat. Gaeko | 2019 | — | Pre |
| "Riding" (라이딩) Ha Sung-woon feat. Gaeko | 2019 | 113 | BXXX |
| "Just Us 2" Exo-SC feat. Gaeko | 2019 | 107 | What a life |
| "Someday" Nafla feat. Gaeko and Yuza | 2020 | — | u n u, Pt. 2 |
| "F(ucked up)" Code Kunst feat. Gaeko and Gray | 2020 | — | People |
| "Fly Away" Exo-SC feat. Gaeko | 2020 | 162 | 1 Billion Views |
| "I Wander" (새 신발) Ha:tfelt feat. Gaeko | 2020 | — (Note: "I Wander" did not enter the Circle Digital Chart, but it debuted and peaked at number 86 on the component Circle Download Chart.) | 1719 |
| "Win Win" (윈윈) Rose de Penny, dsel, kaogaii and Untell feat. BewhY and Gaeko | 2020 | 40 | Show Me The Money 9 Episode 1 |
| "uh-uh" Huh feat. Gaeko and Kid Milli | 2021 | — | uh-uh |
| "Reset (Prod. Code Kunst)" Since and Tabber feat. Gaeko and Kid Milli | 2021 | 17 | Show Me The Money 10 Episode 3 |
| "Midnight" Chancellor feat. Gaeko | 2021 | — | Chancellor |
| "Face Time (Prod. Code Kunst)" Since feat. Giriboy, PH-1 and Gaeko | 2021 | 47 | Show Me The Money 10 Episode Semi Final |
| "Waterbomb" (호우주의) Jo Gwang-il feat. Gaeko and Nucksal | 2021 | 14 | Show Me The Money 10 Episode Semi Final |
| "Journey" (쿠키영상) Jo Gwang-il feat. Ailee, Hangzoo and Gaeko | 2021 | 101 | Show Me The Money 10 Episode Final |
| "Groove Back" JY Park feat. Gaeko | 2022 | 164 | Groove Missing |
| "ING" Apro feat. Gaeko and Penomeco | 2022 | — | Avenue |
| "Jumper" Code Kunst feat. Gaeko and Mino | 2023 | 102 | Remember Archive |
| "Ghost" Penomeco feat. Gaeko and viceversa | 2023 | — | [ Rorschach ] Part 2 |
| "Invitation" Junny feat. Gaeko | 2023 | — | Non-album singles |
| "Start to Shine" Gyubin feat. Gaeko | 2023 | — | Non-album singles |
| "Fair" Gist feat. Gaeko | 2024 | — | Nothing is Perfect |
| "Neuron" J-Hope feat. Gaeko and Yoon Mi-rae | 2024 | 140 | Hope on the Street Vol.1 |
| "Vista" John Park feat. Gaeko and Thama | 2024 | — | Vista |

=== Promotional singles ===
| Title | Year | Peak chart positions | Album |
| Title | Year | KOR | Album |
|---|---|---|---|
| "Over The Mountain (Prod. dress)" with Joohoney and Big Naughty (Note: "Mountain Over the Mountain" will be released as a promotional single in collaboration with Mountain Dew.) | 2023 | — (Note: "Over The Mountain" did not enter on the Circle Digital Chart but peaked at number 141 on the component Download Chart.) | Non-album single |

=== Soundtrack appearances ===
| Title | Year | Peak chart positions | Album |
| Title | Year | KOR | Album |
|---|---|---|---|
| "Send Me Your Pictures" | 2016 | 46 | Entertainer OST |
| "Heart Break" with Kim Na-young | 2020 | — | The King: Eternal Monarch OST |

== Filmography ==
=== Television shows ===
| Year | Title | Role | Notes | Ref. |
|---|---|---|---|---|
| 2021 | Show Me the Money 10 | Producer | with Code Kunst | |
| 2022 | Show Me the Money 11 | Producer | | |
| 2022 | Listen-Up | Host | | |
| 2023 | No Money No Art | Art curator | | |
