= Primary (musician) =

South Korean musician and record producer

- Born: Choi Dong-hoon; January 31, 1983 (age 43); Seoul, South Korea
- Genres: Hip hop; R&B
- Occupations: Musician; record producer; Music director
- Years active: 2004–present
- Label: Paktory Company
- Website: Primary

- Korean name
- Hangul: 최동훈
- RR: Choe Donghun
- MR: Ch'oe Tonghun

Choi Dong-hoon (Korean: 최동훈; born January 31, 1983), better known by the stage name Primary (프라이머리), is a South Korean hip hop musician and record producer. Formerly an artist under Amoeba Culture, he established his own record label Paktory Company on April 22, 2020.

Primary has collaborated with various artists to produce the albums Back Again, Primary Score, Daily Apartment, Primary and the Messengers, and 2. He has also produced albums for other Korean hip hop artists, including Supreme Team's first album Supremier and Dynamic Duo's Kill, as well as several of MBLAQ's singles, including "I'm Back" and "Smokey Girl". He appeared in the MBC variety program Infinite Challenge in 2013.

== Career ==
Primary became active in the South Korean hip hop scene in 2004 with collaborations with Dynamic Duo and Garion. He also gained musical experience while attending Seoul Jazz Academy. In 2006, he debuted with an album named Daily Apartment in collaboration with Beenzino, under the name P' Skool. As part of the promotions for the album, Primary donned a cardboard box mask with a bird beak in order to be more memorable. The band is now inactive, but often play at live performances for Dynamic Duo and Supreme Team.

Primary and Dynamic Duo's Gaeko created a track for Quincy Jones's 2011 visit to Korea which Jones sung at a press conference and expressed his appreciation for. In 2011 Primary released the first part of the album Primary and The Messengers and continued to release the subsequent four parts through October 2012. The album in total includes collaborations with 23 separate artists. He successfully broke into the top ten on various Korean music charts with the album's track "? (Question Mark)" in November 2012. Primary performed a special stage with Dynamic Duo at the 2012 MBC Gayo Daejejeon.

On August 31 and September 1, 2013, Primary held a sold-out joint concert with Zion.T at the Lotte Art Center in Seoul. Primary also participated at the 2013 Infinite Challenge Song Festival, performing with Park Myeong-su and producing a song for Park Ji-yoon. The songs he made for the event, "I Got C" and "Mr. Lee". were later have found to have crossed the line from sampling into plagiarism in their use of Dutch artist Caro Emerald's songs "Liquid Lunch" and "One Day". Primary later officially credited Caro Emerald's composing group Grandmono for the songs. All of the proceeds from the song "I Got C" were later donated. Primary later produced the song "Without You" for Infinite H.

On March 24, 2020, Amoeba Culture announced that their exclusive contract with Primary had been terminated.

On April 22, 2020, he established his own record label Paktory Company.

== Discography ==
=== Studio albums ===
Title	Album details	Peak chart positions	Sales
Title	Album details	KOR	Sales
Primary and the Messengers LP	Released: October 31, 2012; Label: Amoeba Culture, CJ E&M; Formats: CD, digital download; Track listing: 1. "Magic Glass" (요지경) feat. Supreme Team, Yankie, Mellow; 2. "Happy Ending" feat. Jinsil, Gary; 3. Say It" (말이야) feat. Garion; 4. "Meet" (만나) feat. Zion.T; 5. "Away" (멀어) feat. Beenzino; 6. "Love" feat. Bumkey, Paloalto; 7. "See Through" (씨스루) feat. Gaeko, Zion.T; 8. "Mine Tonight" feat. Jinbo, Dok2; 9. "Clean Entrance" (입장정리) feat. Choiza, Simon D 10. "High End Girl" (하이엔드걸) feat. Deez; 11. "2 Weeks" (2주일) feat. Rhythm Power; 12. "?" (물음표) feat. Choiza, Zion.T; 13. "Congratulations" (축하해) feat. Dynamic Duo, Jay Park; 14. "I'm Back" feat. Yankie, Double K, G.O; 15. "Playboy's Diary" feat. Junggigo, Dead'P; 16. "Interlude"; 17. "Poison" (독) feat. E-Sens; 18. "Maebong Station Line 3" (3호선 매봉역) feat. Paloalto, Beenzino; 19. "Outro"; 20. "Where I Am" (거기서 거기읾) feat. Boi B, Dynamic Duo, E-Sens	3	KOR: 27,584
2	Released: August 2, 2015; Label: Amoeba Culture, LOEN Entertainment; Formats: CD, digital download; Track listing: 1. "See You" (조만간 봐요; feat. BSK, Gaeko); 2. "Mannequin" (마네퀸; feat. Beenzino, Suran); 3. "Rubber" (러버; feat. Oh Hyuk); 4. "Paranoia" (피해망상; feat. Gaeko, Sunwoo Jung-ah); 5. "Don't Be Shy" (아끼지마; feat. Choa, Iron); 6. "Just Like U" (feat. Yankie, Jessi); 7. "Established Head" (머리 세웠어; feat. Junggigo); 8. "Hello" (네일 했어; feat. Lena Park); 9. "Mileage" (마일리지; feat. Paloalto, Hwasa); 10. "Her" (그녀는; feat. Choiza, Geegooin); 11. "Gold Finger" (골드핑거; feat. Suran); 12. "U" (feat. Kwon Jin-ah, Rap Monster)	7	KOR: 3,323

=== Extended plays ===
Title	Album details	Peak chart positions
Title	Album details	KOR
Lucky You!	Collaborative album with Oh Hyuk; Released: March 24, 2015; Label: Amoeba Culture, Loen Entertainment; Formats: CD, digital download; Track listing: 1. "eTunnel" (feat. Gaeko); 2. "Bawling"; 3. "Island"; 4. "Gondry" (공드리; feat. Lim Kim)	—
Shininryu (신인류)	Released: August 4, 2017; Label: Amoeba Culture, Loen Entertainment; Formats: CD, digital download; Track listing: 1. "On" (feat. Samuel Seo, George); 2. "Baby" (feat. Jooyoung); 3. "Imagination" (상상해; feat. Chancellor, pH-1); 4. "~42" (feat. Sam Kim, Esna); 5. "I Know" (알아; feat. Sumin); 6. "Somehow Today" (오늘은 왠지; feat. John OFA Rhee); 7. "Night Flower" (밤꽃; feat. Car, the Garden); 8. "Lukewarm" (미지근해; feat. Cokebath)	—
Pop	Released: August 30, 2017; Label: Amoeba Culture, Loen Entertainment; Formats: CD, digital download; Track listing: 1. "Drama" (드라마; feat. Kim Sung-kyu); 2. "Tükk" (툭; feat. Yang Yo-seob); 3. "Right?" (feat. Soyou); 4. "Diet" (다이어트; feat. Solji); 5. "Pick Up" (마중; feat. Sandeul); 6. "Hush" (허쉬; feat. Jay B)	40
Do Worry Be Happy	Collaborative album with Anda; Released: April 3, 2018; Label: Amoeba Culture; Formats: CD, digital download; Track listing: 1. "The Open Boat" (feat. Colde); 2. "Zeppelin"; 3. "Dressroom"; 4. "Moonlight" (월명야 月明夜; feat. Xin Seha)	—
Boxtape	Instrumental album; Released: September 28, 2020; Label: Paktory Company, YG Plus; Formats: CD, digital download; Track listing: 1. "Cloud" (feat. Choa); 2. "Cloud" (Instrumental); 3. "Johnny" (자니) (Instrumental Remastered); 4. "만나" (Instrumental Remastered); 5. "Baby" (Instrumental Remastered); 6. "Mannequin" (마네퀸) (Instrumental Remastered); 7. "Love" (Instrumental Remastered); 8. "Poison" (독) (Instrumental Remastered); 9. "Friendzone" (입장정리) (Instrumental Remastered); 10. "Bawling" (Instrumental Remastered); 11. "Gondry" (Instrumental Remastered); 12. "Open Boat" (Instrumental Remastered); 13. "~42" (Instrumental Remastered); 14. "Tonight" (머리 세웠어) (Instrumental Remastered); 15. "Don't Be Shy" (아끼지마) (Instrumental Remastered); 16. "Tükk" (툭) (Instrumental Remastered); 17. "See Through" (씨스루) (Instrumental Remastered)	—
"—" denotes releases that did not chart or were not released in that region.

=== Singles ===
Title	Year	Peak chart positions	Sales	Album
Title	Year	KOR	Sales	Album
"Magic Glass" (요지경) feat. Supreme Team, Yankie, Mellow	2011	79	KOR: 153,894	Primary And The Messengers
"Johnny" (자니) feat. Dynamic Duo	2012	39	KOR: 2,024,195	Non-album single
"Meet" (만나) feat. Zion.T	2012	74	KOR: 57,159	Primary and the Messengers
"See Through" (씨스루) feat. Gaeko, Zion.T	2012	20	KOR: 1,862,670	Primary and the Messengers
"Clean Entrance" (입장정리) feat. Choiza, Simon D	2012	20	KOR: 796,128	Primary and the Messengers
"?" (물음표) feat. Choiza, Zion.T	2012	3	KOR: 2,378,184	Primary and the Messengers
"Bawling" with Oh Hyuk	2015	39	KOR: 57,298	Lucky You!
"See You" (조만간 봐요) feat. BSK, Gaeko	2015	7	KOR: 490,629	2
"Mannequin" (마네퀸) feat. Beenzino, Suran	2015	11	KOR: 216,611	2
"Don't Be Shy" (아끼지마) feat. Choa, Iron	2015	10	KOR: 491,184	2
"Hello" (네일 했어) feat. Lena Park	2015	33	KOR: 109,466	2
"~42" feat. Sam Kim, Esna	2017	44	KOR: 92,674	Shininryu
"Right?" feat. Soyou	2017	27	KOR: 105,072	Pop
"Dressroom" with Anda	2018	—	—N/a	Do worry Be happy
"woozoo" (우주) feat. SUMIN, Qim Isle	2019	—	—N/a	Non album singles
"When I Fall in Love" feat. Meego, Suran	2019	—	—N/a	Non album singles
"Cloud" feat. Park Choa	2020	— (Note: "Cloud" didn't enter the Gaon Digital Chart, but peaked at position 85 on the Gaon Download Chart)	—N/a	Boxtape
"Bless You" feat. Sam Kim, WOODZ, pH-1	2020	— (Note: "Bless You" didn't enter the Gaon Digital Chart, but peaked at position 139 on the Gaon Download Chart)	—N/a	Paktory Playlist 2020
"—" denotes releases that did not chart.

==== Other charted songs ====
Title	Year	Peak chart positions	Sales	Album
Title	Year	KOR	Sales	Album
"Love" feat. Bumkey, Paloalto	2012	75	KOR: 95,934	Primary and the Messengers
"Mine Tonight" feat. Jinbo, Dok2	2012	86	KOR: 42,047	Primary and the Messengers
"Poison" (독) feat. E-Sens	2012	17	KOR: 715,965	Primary and the Messengers
"Congratulations" (축하해) feat. Dynamic Duo, Jay Park	2012	40	KOR: 340,983	Primary and the Messengers
"I'm Back" feat. Yankie, Double K, G.O	2012	55	KOR: 221,348	Primary and the Messengers
"Maebong Station Line 3" (3호선 매봉역) feat. Paloalto, Beenzino	2012	61	KOR: 243,346	Primary and the Messengers
"Playboy's Diary" feat. Junggigo, Dead'P	2012	67	KOR: 112,051	Primary and the Messengers
"2 Weeks" (2주일) feat. Rhythm Power	2012	83	KOR: 65,243	Primary and the Messengers
"Happy Ending" feat. Jinsil, Gary	2012	84	KOR: 94,033	Primary and the Messengers
"High End Girl" (하이엔드걸) feat. Deez	2012	96	KOR: 56,264	Primary and the Messengers
"Say It" (말이야) feat. Garion	2012	—	KOR: 45,846	Primary and the Messengers
"Away" (멀어) feat. Beenzino	2012	—	KOR: 41,862	Primary and the Messengers
"eTunnel" with Oh Hyuk feat. Gaeko	2015	80	KOR: 23,463	Lucky You!
"Gondry" (공드리) with Oh Hyuk feat. Lim Kim	2015	—	KOR: 18,115	Lucky You!
"Island" with Oh Hyuk	2015	—	KOR: 15,725	Lucky You!
"U" feat. Kwon Jin-ah, RM	2015	32	KOR: 158,700	2
"Established Head" (머리 세웠어) feat. Junggigo	2015	37	KOR: 128,207	2
"Her" (그녀는) feat. Choiza, Geegooin	2015	49	KOR: 95,031	2
"Mileage" (마일리지) feat. Paloalto, Hwasa	2015	45	KOR: 114,263	2
"Rubber" (러버) feat. Oh Hyuk	2015	23	KOR: 152,644	2
"Just Like U" feat. Yankie, Jessi	2015	73	KOR: 35,209	2
"Paranoia" (피해망상) feat. Gaeko, Sunwoo Jung-a	2015	—	KOR: 26,747	2
"Gold Finger" (골드핑거) feat. Suran	2015	—	KOR: 20,136	2
"Drama" (드라마) feat. Kim Sung-kyu	2017	29	KOR: 56,977	Pop
"Took" (툭) feat. Yang Yo-seob	2017	61	KOR: 35,602	Pop
"Pick Up" (마중) feat. B1A4	2017	81	KOR: 30,977	Pop
"Hush" (허쉬) feat. JB	2017	99	KOR: 24,686	Pop
"Diet" (다이어트) feat. EXID	2017	—	KOR: 20,641	Pop
"—" denotes releases that did not chart.

== Filmography ==
=== Television series ===
- D.P (Netflix, 2021)
- Weak Hero Class (Wavve/Netflix, 2021–2025)
- Black Knight (Netflix, 2023)
- A Shop for Killers (Disney+, 2024)
- Unmasked (Disney+, 2025)
- The Trauma Code: Heroes on Call (Netflix, 2025)
- Newtopia (Coupang Play, 2025)
- As You Stood By (SBSTV, 2025)
- Doctor X: Mafia in White (SBSTV, 2026)
- The Blue Road (Netflix, 2026)
