= Big Naughty =

South Korean singer (born 2003)

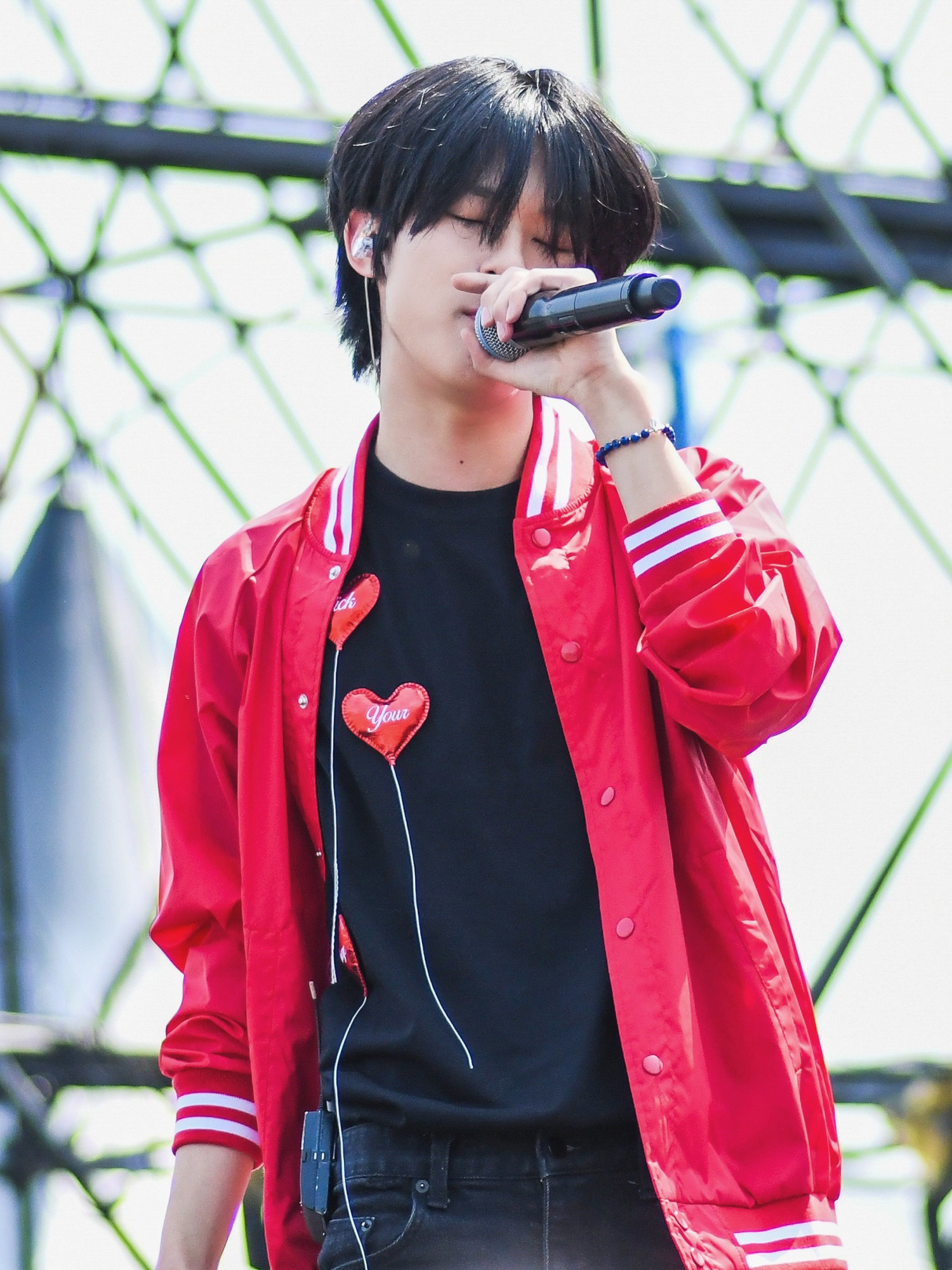
- Big Naughty at The Cry Ground Festival in May 2022

Background information
- Born: Seo Dong-hyeon; June 2, 2003 (age 23)
- Genres: K-hip-hop; Ballad; R&B
- Occupations: Singer; songwriter
- Years active: 2019–present
- Label: H1ghr Music
- Spouse: Unknown (m. 2026)

Seo Dong-hyeon (Korean: 서동현; born June 2, 2003), known professionally as Big Naughty (Korean: 빅 나티; stylized as BIG Naughty), is a South Korean singer and songwriter. He first garnered attention when he appeared on the rap competition TV show Show Me the Money 8 in 2019. He signed to H1ghr Music where he released the extended plays Bucket List (2021) and Nangman (2022).

== Early life ==
Seo Dong-hyeon was born on June 2, 2003. He graduated from Daewon Foreign Language High School.

== Career ==
=== 2019–2020: Show Me the Money 8 and signing to H1ghr Music ===
In July 2019, Big Naughty appeared on the rap competition TV show Show Me the Money 8 where he first garnered attention. He released singles "Bada", "Problems", "010" and "Astronaut" on the show and finished in fourth place. In October 2019, he signed to H1ghr Music. In November 2019, he released his debut single "Where It All Started Remix." In 2020, he participated in H1ghr Music's compilation albums H1ghr: Red Tape and H1ghr: Blue Tape, which were later nominated as Hip-hop Album of the Year at the Korean Hip-hop Awards.

=== 2021–present: Bucket List, Nangman and Hopeless Romantic ===
In 2021, Big Naughty released his debut extended play Bucket List. In January 2022, he was nominated as New Artist of the Year at the Korean Hip-hop Awards. In June 2022, he released the R&B extended play Nangman. In July 2022, he appeared on the record producing competition TV show Listen Up.

== Artistry ==
Big Naughty is known for his "singing rap" style. He considers himself more of an R&B singer than a rapper. He cited rapper Beenzino as his biggest influence.

== Personal life ==
On October 14, 2026, H1gher Music confirmed that Seo had registered his marriage to his girlfriend.

== Discography ==
=== Extended plays ===
List of extended plays, with selected chart positions, and sales
Title	Details	Peak chart positions	Sales
Title	Details	KOR	Sales
Bucket List	Released: February 25, 2021; Label: H1ghr Music; Formats: CD, digital download, streaming	31	KOR: 10,615
Nangman (낭만)	Released: June 9, 2022; Label: H1ghr Music; Format: CD, digital download, streaming	15	KOR: 10,000
Hopeless Romantic (호프리스 로맨틱)	Released: February 28, 2023; Label: H1ghr Music; Formats: CD, digital download, streaming	21	KOR: 12,960
ICN > YVR	Released: November 23, 2023; Label: H1ghr Music; Formats: CD, digital download, streaming	35	KOR: 2,341
+ (with Kid Milli)	Released: October 10, 2024; Label: H1ghr Music, Indigo; Formats: CD, digital download, streaming	46	KOR: 1,967
Between Cobalt and Navy	Released: February 26, 2026; Label: H1ghr Music, Indigo; Formats: LP, digital download, streaming	38	KOR: 4,040

=== Singles ===
==== As lead artist ====
List of singles as lead artist, showing year released, selected chart positions, and name of the album
Title	Year	Peak chart positions		Album
Title	Year	KOR Circle	KOR Billb. (Note: Includes the Billboard K-pop Hot 100 (defunct as of 2022), and South Korea Songs (part of Billboard's Hits of the World (2022 onwards)).)	Album
"Bada" (바다) (with Woodie Gochild, ChoiLB, Yang Hong-won, Chillin Homie featuring Giriboy)	2019	48	85	Show Me the Money 8
"CCTV" (with Lil Tachi featuring Leellamarz)	2019	180	—	Show Me the Money 8
"Problems" (문제) (featuring Coogie)	2019	82	—	Show Me the Money 8
"010" (전화번호) (featuring Giriboy)	2019	—	—	Show Me the Money 8
"Astronaut"	2019	—	—	Show Me the Money 8
"Sick Teen" (급Sick) (with M1nu, Layone, Veinifyl)	2019	—	—	Show Me the Money 8
"Where It All Started Remix" (시발점 Remix) (featuring Verbal Jint and Beenzino)	2019	— (Note: "Where It All Started Remix" did not enter the Gaon Digital Chart, but peaked at number 176 on the Gaon Download chart.)	94	Non-album singles
"Sigh" (휴) (featuring Giriboy)	2019	—	—	Non-album singles
"Girl at the Coffee Shop" (커피가게 아가씨) (featuring Wonstein)	2021	— (Note: "Girl at the Coffee Shop" did not enter the Gaon Digital Chart, but peaked at number 67 on the Gaon Download Chart.)	—	Bucket List
"Joker" (featuring Jamie)	2021	130	76	Bucket List
"Brand New World" (멋진 신세계) (featuring Rohann)	2021	— (Note: "Brand New World" did not enter the Gaon Digital Chart, but peaked at number 157 on the Gaon Download Chart.)	—	Bucket List
"Turn Up!" (털어!) (featuring M1nu, Veinyfl, Swervy, Layone, Lee Young-ji, Lil Nekh, D.Ark)	2021	— (Note: "Turn Up!" did not enter the Gaon Digital Chart, but peaked at number 84 on the Gaon Download Chart.)	—	"Sike"!
"Stab" (featuring EaJ)	2021	— (Note: "Stab" did not enter the Gaon Digital Chart, but peaked at number 149 on the Gaon Download Chart.)	—	Non-album single
"Beyond Love" (정이라고 하자) (featuring 10cm)	2022	5	4	Nangman
"Lovey Dovey" (featuring Meenoi)	2022	— (Note: "Lovey Dovey" did not enter the Gaon Digital Chart, but peaked at number 110 on the Gaon Download Chart.)	—	Nangman
"Romance Symphony" (낭만교향곡) (featuring Changmo and Jay Park)	2022	49	20	Nangman
"Just 10 Centimeters" (딱 10CM만) (with 10cm)	2022	8	12	Non-album single
"Fxxxnds" (친구로 지내다 보면) (featuring Kim Min-seok)	2023	42	—	Hopeless Romantic
"Hopeless Romantic" (사랑이라 믿었던 것들은) (featuring Lee Su-hyun)	2023	50	—	Hopeless Romantic
"Night Dancer" (Big Naughty Remix) (with Imase)	2023	81	—	Non-album single
"Vancouver 2"	2023	24	19	ICN > YVR
"ICN > YVR" (연착)	2023	119	—	ICN > YVR
"INFJ" (featuring B.I and Bang Ye-dam)	2023	— (Note: "INFJ" did not enter the Circle Digital Chart, but peaked at number 53 and 102 on components Download Chart and BGM Chart, respectively.)	—	Dingo X Big Naughty
"Sunkissed" (featuring Mark of NCT)	2024	124	—	Non-album singles
"Hero Death" (featuring Sion)	2024	145	—	Non-album singles
"Music" (featuring Lee Chan-hyuk)	2025	135	—	Non-album singles
"Bye Bye" (바이 바이) (featuring Lee Mu-jin)	2025	108	—	Non-album singles
"Emergency Room" (응급실)	2025	163	—	Non-album singles
"Just 1 Year" (딱 1년만) (featuring 10cm)	2025	107	—	Between Cobalt and Navy
"Lovey Dovey" (Solo Ver.)	2026	198	—	Non-album singles
"Nostalgia" (노스탈지아)	2026	5	—	Non-album singles
"—" denotes a recording that did not chart or was not released in that territory.

==== As featured artist ====
List of charted singles as featured artist, showing year released, selected chart positions, and name of the album
Title	Year	Peak chart positions		Album
Title	Year	KOR Circle	KOR Billb.	Album
"Eul" (을) (Giriboy featuring Big Naughty)	2019	58	49	2 Little Bites from Fatal Album III
"Tomorrow" (내일이 오면) (Lil Boi featuring Giriboy, Big Naughty)	2020	2	6	Show Me the Money 9
"Red Light" (Touch The Sky featuring Big Naughty)	2021	— (Note: "Red Light" did not enter the Gaon Digital Chart, but peaked at number 116 on the Gaon Download Chart.)	—	High School Rapper 4
"Lie" (거짓말) (Kim Seung-min featuring Big Naughty)	2021	— (Note: "Lie" did not enter the Gaon Digital Chart, but peaked at number 184 on the Gaon Download Chart.)	—	Prototype Research #0063
"Timing" (타이밍) (Koonta featuring Yumdda, Big Naughty)	2021	119	—	Show Me the Money 10
"Walk Again" (다시 걸을 때) (Toil featuring Heize, Big Naughty)	2022	109	—	Between Sat & Sun
"Way" (길) (Giriboy featuring ChoiLB, Kvsh, Kim Seung-min, OLNL, Kid Milli, Thama, Big Naughty)	2022	— (Note: "Way" did not enter the Gaon Digital Chart, but peaked at number 124 on the Gaon Download Chart.)	—	Demotape
"Evening" (이브닝) (Yuju featuring Big Naughty)	2022	— (Note: "Evening" did not enter the Circle Digital Chart, but peaked at number 73 and 161 on the Circle Download Chart and Circle BGM Chart, respectively.)	—	Non-album single
"Drivin'" (Kim Seung-min featuring Layone, Big Naughty)	2022	— (Note: "Drivin'" did not enter the Circle Digital Chart, but peaked at number 157 on the Circle Download Chart.)	—	Double-sidedness
"Better" (Mamamoo+ featuring Big Naughty)	2022	140	—	Non-album single
"Number" (Leellamarz featuring Big Naughty)	2022	141	—	MaRz&B
"Eye" (눈) (Don Malik featuring Justhis, Big Naughty)	2022	17	24	Show Me the Money 11
"Hangang" (한강에서) (Paul Kim featuring Big Naughty)	2023	48	—	Non-album single
"Dare to Love" (겁도없이) (B.I featuring Big Naughty)	2023	77	—	To Die For
"—" denotes a recording that did not chart or was not released in that territory.

=== Soundtrack appearances ===
List of soundtrack appearances, showing year released, selected chart positions, and name of the album
Title	Year	Peak chart positions	Album
Title	Year	KOR	Album
"Sigh" (휴) (with Shin Ha-kyun)	2020	—	Soul Mechanic OST
"Home" (with Exy and Raiden)	2021	— (Note: "Home" did not enter the Gaon Digital Chart, but peaked at number 141 and 147 on the Gaon Download Chart and Gaon BGM Chart, respectively.)	Idol: The Coup OST
"It's Seoul, I'm Here" (with Kid Milli and Ron)	2022	—	Seoul Check-in OST
"The Invention of Love" (연애의 발명)	2022	122	Discovery of Love OST
"Love Letter (With You)" (연서 (with you))	2022	— (Note: "Love Letter (With You)" did not enter the Circle Digital Chart, but peaked at number 11 and 43 on the Circle BGM Chart and Circle Download Chart, respectively.)	Alchemy of Souls OST
"With Me" (손을 마주 잡고)	2023	94	The Interest of Love OST
"My Lips Like Warm Coffee" (내 입술 따뜻한 커피처럼) (with Joy)	2024	121	The Last 10 Years OST
"—" denotes a recording that did not chart or was not released in that territory.

=== Other charted songs ===
List of other charted songs, showing year released, selected chart positions, and name of the album
Title	Year	Peak chart positions		Album
Title	Year	KOR Circle	KOR Billb.	Album
"VVS (H1ghr Remix)" (with pH-1, Trade L, Woodie Gochild, Jay Park, Kidd King featuring Justhis)	2021	108	—	G+Jus
"Vancouver"	2022	94	21	Nangman
"—" denotes a recording that did not chart or was not released in that territory.

== Composition credits ==
All song credits are adapted from the Korea Music Copyright Association's database unless stated otherwise.

=== 2019 ===
Artist	Song	Album	Lyrics		Music	
Artist	Song	Album	Credited	With	Credited	With
Big Naughty	"Where It All Started Remix" (시발점 Remix) (featuring Beenzino)	Non-album single	Yes	Verbal Jint, Beenzino	Yes	Verbal Jint
Big Naughty	"010" (전화번호) (featuring Giriboy)	Show Me the Money 8	Yes	Giriboy	Yes	Giriboy, Hoi Wave, Big Pie
Big Naughty	"Astronaut"	Show Me the Money 8	Yes	—N/a	Yes	Oviz
Big Naughty	"Problems" (문제) (featuring Coogie)	Show Me the Money 8	Yes	Giriboy, Coogie	Yes	Giriboy, Park Kyung-min, Coogie
Big Naughty with Lil Tachi	"CCTV" (featuring Leellamarz)	Show Me the Money 8	Yes	Leellamarz, Lil Tachi	No	—N/a
Woodie Gochild with Choi LB, Big Naughty, Young B, Chillin Homie	"Bada" (바다)	Show Me the Money 8	Yes	Giriboy, Choi LB, Young B, Woodie Gochild, Chillin Homie	Yes	Giriboy, Young B, Woodie Gochild

=== 2020 ===
Artist	Song	Album	Lyrics		Music	
Artist	Song	Album	Credited	With	Credited	With
Big Naughty	"Live" (잠깐만)	H1ghr: Blue Tape	Yes	—N/a	Yes	Woogie
Big Naughty	"Sigh" (휴) (featuring Giriboy)	Non-album single	Yes	—N/a	Yes	Giriboy
Cosmic Boy	"Ordinary" (일상다반사) (featuring OLNL, Big Naughty)	Can I Heat ?	Yes	OLNL	Yes	Cosmic Boy, OLNL
Damye	"snooze!" (featuring Big Naughty)	Non-album single	Yes	Damye	Yes	Damye
Hahoe x Moai	"Balloon" (풍선) (featuring Big Naughty)	흥과 뽕 : 뽕 Part	Yes	Hahoe, Moai	Yes	Hahoe, Laptop Boy, Moai
Jay Park with Ted Park, Woodie Gochild, Big Naughty	"End of the Night"	H1ghr: Blue Tape	Yes	Jay Park, Woodie Gochild, Park Ted	Yes	Jay Park, Woogie, Woodie Gochild, Park Ted
Jay Park with pH-1, Big Naughty, Woodie Gochild, Haon, Trade L	"The Purge"	H1ghr: Red Tape	Yes	Jay Park, Sik-K, pH-1, Haon, Woodie Gochild, Trade L	No	—N/a
Jay Park with Sik-K, pH-1, Big Naughty, Trade L, Haon, Woodie Gochild	"How We Rock"	H1ghr: Red Tape	Yes	Jay Park, Sik-K, pH-1, Haon, Woodie Goodchild, Trade L	No	—N/a
Jo Woo-chan	"Exam" (시험 끝) (featuring Big Naughty)	ID Schoolboy Pt.3	Yes	Jo Woo-chan	No	—N/a
Lil Boi	"Tomorrow" (내일이 오면) (featuring Giriboy and Big Naughty)	Show Me the Money 9	Yes	Lil Boi, Giriboy	Yes	Lil Boi, Giriboy, Park Kyung-min, Fisherman, Slom, Park Jun-woo
M1nu	"Wings" (날개)	Flashback	Yes	M1nu	No	—N/a
pH-1 with Big Naughty, G.Soul, Jay Park	"Oscar"	H1ghr: Blue Tape	Yes	Jay Park, G.Soul, pH-1	Yes	Jay Park, G.Soul, pH-1, Gxxd
pH-1 with Haon, Woodie Gochild, Jay Park, Sik-K, Trade L, Big Naughty	"Teléfono Remix"	H1ghr: Red Tape	Yes	Jay Park, Sik-K, pH-1, Haon, Woodie Gochild, Trade L	No	—N/a
Ravi	"If I" (featuring Big Naughty)	Paradise	Yes	Ravi	Yes	Ravi, Woogie
Seong Guk	"Ninja" (featuring Big Naughty, Skinny Brown, Chillin Home)	Non-album single	Yes	Skinny Brown, Chillin Homie	No	—N/a
Sik-K with Big Naughty, Woodie Gochild, Haon, Trade L	"DDDD Freestyle" (뚝딱 Freestyle)	H1ghr: Red Tape	Yes	Boycold, GroovyRoom, Sik-K, Haon, Woodie Gochild, Trade L, Adam King Feeney	Yes	Boycold, GroovyRoom, Sik-K, Haon, Woodie Gochild, Trade L, Adam King Feeney
Sik-K with Trade L, Woodie Gochild, Big Naughty	"RSVP Remix"	H1ghr: Blue Tape	Yes	Sik-K, Woodie Gochild, Trade L	Yes	Boycold, Sik-K, Woodie Gochild, Trade L
Sleepy	"Like a Dream" (꿈만 같아) (featuring Big Naughty)	Non-album single	Yes	Sleepy	Yes	Coup d'etat, Assbrass

=== 2021 ===
Artist	Song	Album	Lyrics		Music	
Artist	Song	Album	Credited	With	Credited	With
Big Naughty	"Home" (featuring Exy and Raiden)	Idol: The Coup OST	Yes	Jade.J	Yes	Raiden, Sibel Redzep, Konstantin Zandelin, Sofia Karlberg, Aleksandr Gennadevich Parkhomenko, Fan You Chen
Big Naughty	"In My Mood"	Non-album single	Yes	Soyoujin	Yes	Hoi Wave
Big Naughty	"Stab" (featuring eaJ)	Non-album single	Yes	eaJ	Yes	Dress, eaJ
Big Naughty	"Kwaejina Ching Ching Nane (Daegu)" (쾌지나 칭칭나네 (대구))	Feel the Rhythm of Korea Part 1	Yes	—N/a	Yes	GroovyRoom, Kim Tae-san
Big Naughty	"Bourgeois" (featuring Zior Park)	Hang Out: Hiphopplaya Compilation Album 2021 Part 6	Yes	Zior Park	Yes	Dress, Zior Park
Big Naughty	"Turn Up!" (털어!) (featuring M1nu, Veinyfl, Swervy, Layone, Young Ji Lee, Lil Nekh, D.Ark)	"Sike!"	Yes	Swervy, Lee Young-ji, Layone, Veinyfl, M1nu, D.ark, Lil Nekh	Yes	BMTJ
Big Naughty	"5 Gawd Remix"	"Sike!"	Yes	Superbee	No	—N/a
Big Naughty	"$$$" (featuring Kid Milli)	"Sike!"	Yes	Kid Milli	Yes	BMTJ
Big Naughty	"10 Years Later" (10년후) (featuring Paloalto)	Bucket List	Yes	Paloalto	Yes	Minit, Paloalto
Big Naughty	"Brand New World" (멋진신세계) (featuring Rohann)	Bucket List	Yes	Rohann, Seo Taiji	Yes	Seo Taiji, Peejay
Big Naughty	"Joker" (featuring Jamie)	Bucket List	Yes	Jamie	Yes	Noden, Jamie, Hoi Wave, Sound Kim
Big Naughty	"Bucket List"	Bucket List	Yes	—N/a	Yes	DPR Cream
Big Naughty	"Bravo" (부라보) (featuring Coogie and G.Soul)	Bucket List	Yes	G.Soul, Coogie	Yes	G.Soul, Gray, Dax, Coogie, Perro
Big Naughty	"Frank Ocean" (featuring Sole)	Bucket List	Yes	Sole	Yes	Cosmic Boy
Big Naughty	"Girl At The Coffee Shop" (커피가게 아가씨) (featuring Wonstein)	Non-album single	Yes	Wonstein	Yes	Wonstein, Peejay
Dress	"Something" (featuring Meego and Big Naughty)	Non-album single	Yes	An Dayoung	Yes	Dress, Lee A-il
Kim Seung-min	"Lie" (featuring Big Naughty)	Prototype Research #0063	Yes	Kim Seung-min, Derek	Yes	Minit, Kim Seung-min, Base Camp, Derek
Koonta	"Timing" (타이밍) (featuring Big Naughty and Yumdda)	Show Me the Money 10	Yes	Leellamarz, Koona, Yumdda	Yes	Toil, Leellamarz, Koonta, Yumdda
Lil Nekh	"Red Light" (featuring Big Naughty)	School Rapper 4 Semi Final 2	Yes	Lil Nekh	Yes	Code Kunst, Pick!, Lil Nekh
Lil Tachi	"Mar Ma" (말을 마) (featuring Big Naughty and DJ Wegun)	Forever Young	Yes	Lil Tachi	No	—N/a
Minit	"#2021" (featuring Avokid and Big Naughty)	Non-album single	Yes	Avokid	Yes	Minit, Avokid
pH-1 with Big Naughty, Trade L, Woodie Gochild, Park Jae-beom, Kidd King	"VVS" (H1ghr Remix) (featuring Justhis)	G+Jus	Yes	Park Jae-beom, Justhis, pH-1, Woodie Gochild, Kidd King, Trade L	No	—N/a
Suran	"Sunny" (Tak Remix) (featuring Big Naughty)	Non-album single	Yes	Suran, Shim Hyun-bo	Yes	Suran, Charming Lips, Zayson
Various Artists	"Code Clear" (격리해제)	Non-album single	Yes	Various Artists	No	—N/a
Verbal Jint	"Discord" (불협화음) (featuring Big Naughty)	Inflection Point	Yes	Verbal Jint	No	—N/a

=== 2022 ===
Artist	Song	Album	Lyrics		Music	
Artist	Song	Album	Credited	With	Credited	With
10cm with Big Naughty	"Just 10 centimeters" (딱 10CM만)	Non-album single	Yes	10cm	Yes	Toil
Big Naughty	"Not Now"	New Love Playlist OST	Yes	—N/a	Yes	Dress
Big Naughty	"The invention of romance"	Discovery of Love OST	Yes	—N/a	Yes	Sec Paul
Big Naughty	"Summer Song" (여름 밤에 쓴 노래) (featuring Leellamarz)	Listen-Up EP.2	Yes	Leellamarz	Yes	Groovyroom, Leellamarz
Big Naughty	"Do You Believe In Romance" (낭만이라고 부르기로 하였다.)	Nangman	Yes	—N/a	Yes	Brendan Michael Hoy, Plantcham, Spencr
Big Naughty	"Romance Symphony" (낭만교향곡) (featuring Changmo and Jay Park)	Nangman	Yes	Jay Park, Changmo	Yes	Jay Park, Dress, The Glowing Dog, Changmo
Big Naughty	"Lovey Dovey" (featuring meenoi)	Nangman	Yes	Meenoi	Yes	Sec Paul, Meenoi
Big Naughty	"Poker" (featuring Dvwn)	Nangman	Yes	Dvwn	Yes	Cosmic Boy, Dvwn
Big Naughty	"Vancouver"	Nangman	Yes	—N/a	Yes	Sec Paul
Big Naughty	"Beyond Love" (정이라고 하자) (featuring 10cm)	Nangman	Yes	—N/a	Yes	Toil, Kizo
Big Naughty	"Actor" (featuring pH-1)	Nangman	Yes	pH-1	Yes	pH-1, Hoi Wave
Big Naughty	"Bridal Chorus" (결혼행진곡) (featuring Dbo)	Nangman	Yes	Dbo	Yes	Vibin
Big Naughty	"Hachiko" (featuring Sion, Yescoba, Ahn Dayoung)	Nangman	Yes	Yescoba, Ahn Dayoung, Sion	Yes	Yescoba, Ahn Dayoung, Sion
Big Naughty	"Period," (마침표)	Nangman	Yes	—N/a	Yes	Boycold
Boycold	"Breezy~" (바람바람~) (featuring Kid Milli and Big Naughty	Daft Love	Yes	Kidi Milli	Yes	Boycold
Davii	"Flying" (featuring Big Naughty)	4th Mini Album ?=3 GENEZIS3	Yes	Davii	Yes	Antik, Davii
Gemini	"1, 2, 3" (featuring Big Naughty)	Non-album single	Yes	Gemini	Yes	Kwaca, Gemini
Gemini with Reddy	"Rodeo" (압구정 로데오)	Listen-Up EP.8	Yes	Reddy	Yes	Reddy, Dress
George	"ttm(thinktoomuch)" (featuring Big Naughty)	FFR	Yes	George	Yes	George, Archie
Giriboy	"Way" (길) (featuring Choi LB, Big Naughty, Kvsh, Kim Seung-min, OLNL, Kid Milli & Thama)	Demotape	Yes	Giriboy, Choi LB, Kid Milli, OLNL, Kim Seung-min	No	—N/a
Gomak Boys	"Sweet Thing" (단거)	Gomak Boys	Yes	Kim Ina	No	—N/a
H1ghr Music	"BRB"	Non-album single	Yes	Jay Park, Def, Kwon Min-sik, pH-1, Park Hyun-jin, Kim Ha-on, Trade L	Yes	Jay Park, Groovyroom, Def, Kwon Min-sik, pH-1, Park Hyun-jin, Kim Ha-on, Trade L, Cha Cha Malone
Huh with Big Naughty	"Revival"	Listen-Up EP.5	Yes	Heo Sung-hyun	Yes	Dress, 901010, Primary
Jiselle	"Way U Are" (featuring Big Naughty)	Non-album single	Yes	Jiselle	Yes	Maxx Song, Jiselle, Purple
Kid Milli with Big Naughty and Ron	"it's Seoul, i'm here"	Seoul Check-in OST	Yes	Kid Milli, Ron	Yes	Dress, Kid Milli, Ron
Kim Seung-min	"Drivin" (featuring Layone and Big Naughty)	Non-album single	Yes	Kim Seung-min, Layone, Kim Min-jae	Yes	Minit, Kim Seung-min, Heondred, Kim Min-jae
Kixo	"This is my first love song" (이건내가처음쓰는사랑노래) (featuring Big Naughty)	Non-album single	Yes	Kixo	Yes	Loading, Kixo
Lee Hwi-min	"Boss" (featuring Saay, Big Naughty & GooseBumps)	AAA	Yes	Kwon So-hee	Yes	Park Gyu-gyu, Kwon So-hee, Lee Hwi-min, Jeong Hyun-je
Leellamarz	"Number" (featuring Big Naughty)	MaRz&B	Yes	Leellamarz	Yes	Boycold, Midas P, Leellamarz
Mamamoo+	"Better" (featuring Big Naughty)	Non-album single	Yes	Ravn, Peter Hyun, Sky Young	Yes	Ravn, Peter Hyun, Sky Young
Minsu	"Friendzone" (오해 금지) (featuring Big Naughty)	Friendzone	Yes	Humbert, Minsu, Kang Eun-gu	Yes	Humbert, Minsu, Kang Eun-gu
NSW yoon	"Love My Life" (featuring Big Naughty and Xwally)	Non-album single	Yes	NSW yoon, Xwally	Yes	Crevm Dian, NSW yoon, Xwally
Polodared	"La La La" (랄랄라) (featuring Lil Gimchi and Big Naughty)	Polodared 2	Yes	Lil Gimchi, Polodared	No	—N/a
Reddy	"Ceremony" (featuring Big Naughty)	Non-album single	Yes	Reddy	No	—N/a
Skinny Brown	"Lone Wolf (3:00 am)" (풀리지 않는 고민) (featuring Kim Seung-min, Jay B & Big Naughty)	Listen-Up EP.3	Yes	Jay B, Kim Seung-min, Skinny Brown	Yes	Jay B, Dress, Kim Seung-min, Skinny Brown
SMMT	"RnB 4 Sk8ers" (featuring Big Naughty and Ace Hashimoto)	Mr. Hollywood	Yes	Ace Hashimoto	Yes	SMMT, Dongpino, Ace Hashimoto
Sokodomo	"Deja Vu" (featuring Big Naughty, Jay Park & MVP)	Listen-Up EP.9	Yes	Jay Park, Sokodomo	Yes	Jay Park, Dress, Sokodomo
Sole	"every day good day" (featuring Big Naughty)	imagine club	Yes	Sole	Yes	Sole, Joe
Toil	"walk again" (다시 걸을 때) (featuring Heize and Big Naughty)	Between Sat & Sun	Yes	Heize	Yes	Heize, Toil, Park Chan-ryeol
Yuju	"Evening" (featuring Big Naughty)	Non-album single	Yes	Knave, Purple, Yuju, The Chancellor	Yes	Knave, Purple, The Chancellor

=== 2023 ===
Artist	Song	Album	Lyrics		Music	
Artist	Song	Album	Credited	With	Credited	With
Big Naughty	"Hopeless Romantic" (사랑이라 믿었던 것들은) (featuring Lee Su-hyun)	Hopeless Romantic	Yes	—N/a	Yes	Dress
Big Naughty	"Korean Ballad" (뻔한발라드)	Hopeless Romantic	Yes	—N/a	Yes	Dress
Big Naughty	"Fxxxnds" (친구로지내다보면) (featuring Kim Min-seok)	Hopeless Romantic	Yes	—N/a	Yes	Dress
Big Naughty	"Dot" (덫)	Hopeless Romantic	Yes	—N/a	Yes	Dress
Big Naughty	"Sleepwalker" (featuring Genius Nochang)	Hopeless Romantic	Yes	Genius Nochang	Yes	Genius Nochang, Dress
Big Naughty	"One Last Poem" (마지막시)	Hopeless Romantic	Yes	—N/a	Yes	Dress
Big Naughty	"Papillon" (빠삐용)	Hopeless Romantic	Yes	—N/a	Yes	Dress
Big Naughty	"Turbulence" (난기류)	ICN > YVR	Yes	—N/a	Yes	Dress
Big Naughty	"ICN > YVR"	ICN > YVR	Yes	—N/a	Yes	Toil
Big Naughty	"One-Way" (직항)	ICN > YVR	Yes	—N/a	Yes	Toil
Big Naughty	"Him" (쟤)	ICN > YVR	Yes	—N/a	Yes	Dress
Big Naughty	"Vancouver 2"	ICN > YVR	Yes	—N/a	Yes	Dress
Big Naughty	"Lovers Rock"	ICN > YVR	Yes	—N/a	Yes	Dress
Big Naughty	"Dominic Fike"	ICN > YVR	Yes	—N/a	Yes	Dress, Riddell Lewin
Big Naughty	"Your Highness"	ICN > YVR	Yes	—N/a	Yes	—N/a
Big Naughty	"INFJ" (featuring B.I and Bang Ye-dam)	Dingo X Big Naughty	Yes	B.I, Bang Ye-dam	Yes	B.I, Way Ched, Bang Ye-dam
Big Naughty	"IMFP"	Dingo X Big Naughty	Yes	—N/a	Yes	Dress
Big Naughty	"Rock the Cup"	Non-album single	Yes	—N/a	Yes	Dress
Big Naughty	"Love to Hate You" (그러니까 하고 싶은 내 말은)	Love to Hate You OST Part 3	Yes	Dani	Yes	Park Geun-cheol, Dani, Jeong Soo-min
B.I	"Dare to Love" (겁도없이) (featuring Big Naughty)	To Die For	Yes	B.I	Yes	B.I, Diggy, Kang Wook-jin
Code Kunst	"Slip" (이불) (featuring Big Naughty)	Remember Archive	Yes	—N/a	Yes	Code Kunst, Park Jong-kwon
Cosmic Boy	"Cartoon" (만화) (featuring Big Naughty and Sarah Kang)	Can I Not?	Yes	Sunny Shin, Sarah Kang	Yes	Cosmic Boy, Sarah Kang
Cosmic Boy	"Grown Child" (어린어른) (featuring Big Naughty)	Can I Not?	Yes	—N/a	Yes	Cosmic Boy
Dress	"Over the Mountain" (featuring Gaeko, Joohoney & Big Naughty)	Non-album single	Yes	Joohoney, Ron, Gaeko	Yes	Dress, Ron
Giriboy	"Tik Tok" (Band ver.) (시간이날기다려) (featuring Choi LB and Big Naughty)	appendix	Yes	Giriboy, Choi LB	No	—N/a
Heize	"Forget Me Not" (잊혀지는 사랑인가요)	Last Winter	Yes	Kid Wine	Yes	Kid Wine, Pateko
imase	"Night Dancer (Big Naughty Remix)"	Non-album single	Yes	imase	Yes	imase
Ive	"Baddie"	I've Mine	Yes	Perrie	No	—N/a
Ive	"Payback"	I've Mine	Yes	Young	No	—N/a
Jeon Somi with Big Naughty	"Ex-Mas"	Non-album single	Yes	Jeon Somi	Yes	NOHC, Jeon Somi, Vince
Mirani	"Bad Boy" (featuring Big Naughty)	The Drift	Yes	Mirani	Yes	Kwava, Mirani, Samuel R. Matthews
Park Hyeon-jin	"Yooou" (너) (featuring Big Naughty)	Non-album single	Yes	Park Hyeon-jin	Yes	Park Hyeon-jin, Sec Paul
Paul Kim	"Hangang" (한강에서) (featuring Big Naughty)	Non-album single	Yes	Paul Kim, El Capitxn, Coll! N, Vendors	Yes	Paul Kim, El Capitxn, Coll! N, Vendors
pH-1	"Rosetta Remix" (featuring Lobonabeat!, Big Naughty & Owen)	Non-album single	Yes	Owen, pH-1, Lobonabeat!	No	—N/a
Sik-K	"I Wonder" (기다리는 게 맞나?)	Pop A Lot	Yes	Sik-K	Yes	Sik-K, Kwon Se-young
Team 24:00	"This That Shhh"	Peak Time - Final Round	Yes	Jay Park, pH-1	Yes	Jay Park, Cha Cha Malone
Way Ched	"Dial" (뚝) (featuring Leellamarz and Big Naughty)	Come Away	Yes	Leellamarz	Yes	Way Ched, Leellamarz

=== 2024 ===
Artist	Song	Album	Lyrics		Music	
Artist	Song	Album	Credited	With	Credited	With
Be'O	"Universe" (우주} (featuring Big Naughty)	Affection	Yes	Be'O	Yes	Be'O, Rubyboy
Big Naughty	"Sunkissed" (featuring Mark Lee)	Non-album single	Yes	Mark Lee	Yes	Giriboy, Mark Lee
Toil	"My Bad" (featuring Ash Island)	Toto	Yes	Ash Island	Yes	Toil, Ash Island, Hwang Se-hyun, Kyuu

=== 2025 ===
Artist	Song	Album	Lyrics		Music	
Artist	Song	Album	Credited	With	Credited	With
Minnie	"Her"	Her	Yes	Minnie, Charlotte, Tim Tan	No	—N/a

== Filmography ==
=== Television shows ===
Year	Title	Role	Ref.
2019	Show Me the Money 8	Contestant	
2022	Listen Up	Contestant	
2022	King of Mask Singer	Contestant	

=== Web shows ===
Year	Title	Role	Ref.
2022	Gomak Boys	Cast member	

== Awards and nominations ==
Award	Year	Category	Nominee	Result	Ref.
Korean Hip-hop Awards	2021	Hip Hop Track of the Year	"The Purge"	Nominated	
Korean Hip-hop Awards	2021	Music Video of the Year	"The Purge"	Won	
Korean Hip-hop Awards	2022	New Artist of the Year	Himself	Nominated	
Genie Music Awards	2022	Song of the Year	"Beyond Love"	Nominated	
Golden Disc Awards	2022	Best Digital Song	"Beyond Love"	Nominated	
MAMA Awards	2022	Best Hip-hop & Urban Music	"Beyond Love"	Nominated	
MAMA Awards	2022	Best Collaboration	"Just 10 centimeters"	Nominated	
Melon Music Awards	2022	Best Collaboration	"Just 10 centimeters"	Won	
Melon Music Awards	2022	Best Male Solo	Himself	Nominated	
Melon Music Awards	2022	Top 10	Himself	Nominated	
Melon Music Awards	2022	Best Music Style	Himself	Won	
