= Trade L =

South Korean rapper and singer (born 2004)

TRADE L 트레이드 엘
- Born: Lee Seung-hoon (이승훈); July 21, 2004 (age 21); Seoul, South Korea
- Genres: Hip hop; R&B
- Occupations: Rapper; singer
- Instrument: Vocals
- Years active: 2020–present
- Labels: H1ghr Music, AMBITION MUSIK

- Korean name
- Hangul: 이승훈
- RR: I Seunghun
- MR: I Sŭnghun

Lee Seung-hoon (Korean: 이승훈; born July 21, 2004) better known by his stage name TRADE L (Hangul: 트레이드 엘), is a South Korean rapper and singer. He signed with H1ghr Music in 2020, and became the winner of the fourth season of High School Rapper in 2021. He released his debut extended play, Time Table – The Trip, on November 25, 2021. On May 3, 2025, H1GHR MUSIC would announce his departure from the label, following the end of his exclusive contract. On April 27, 2026, he signed with AMBITION MUSIK.

== Discography ==
=== Extended plays ===
Title	Album details	Peak chart positions
Title	Album details	Circle
Time Table – The Trip	Released: November 25, 2021; Label: H1ghr Music; Formats: CD, digital download	52
Love Maze	Released: October 28, 2022; Label: H1ghr Music; Formats: CD, digital download	—
Unsteady	Released: March 17, 2023; Label: H1ghr Music; Formats: CD, digital download	84
Ched&L with Way Ched	Released: November 12, 2023; Label: H1ghr Music; Formats: CD, digital download	—

=== Charted songs ===
Title	Year	Peak chart positions	Album
Title	Year	KOR	Album
As lead artist
"Supernova" featuring Changmo, G.Soul, Dut2	2021	158	High School Rapper 4
"Ooh Wah" featuring Changmo, Wonstein	2021	176	High School Rapper 4
Collaborations
"VVS (H1ghr Remix)" with pH-1, Big Naughty, Woodie Gochild, Jay Park, Kidd King featuring Justhis	2021	108	G+Jus
"Backpack" with Yung Chens, Baegie, D.Ark featuring Changmo	2021	128	High School Rapper 4
"Flirt" with Way Ched featuring Leellamarz	2025	128	Ched&L
