= H1ghr: Red Tape =

Compilation album by H1ghr Music
- Released: September 2, 2020
- Genre: Hip hop
- Length: 53:32
- Language: Korean
- Label: H1ghr Music

H1ghr Music chronology
H1ghr: Red Tape (2020)	H1ghr: Blue Tape (2020)

H1ghr: Red Tape (stylized as H1GHR : RED TAPE) is the first compilation album of South Korean hip-hop label H1ghr Music released on September 2, 2020. It was nominated for Hip-hop Album of the Year at the Korean Hip-hop Awards and peaked at number 15 on the Gaon Album Chart.

== Background ==
In an interview with Clash, Jay Park explained why the compilation album was created.

"It was important for H1GHR MUSIC to create the compilation projects because first, we wanted to show everybody what's good with us. To put the newer artists on and to show what type of artists we have and what we are capable of. Secondly, it's to make everybody at the label, not just the artists, realize the synergy we can create when we do things as a team and the strength in it. Why we need each other and how we bring the best out of each other. Lastly, I've never spearheaded a compilation album before so it was simply for the challenge and to elevate the bar when it comes to music, visuals, and how to promote it for the culture."

== Music and lyrics ==
"DDDD Freestyle" is a "young and energetic track" with "Big Naughty's impressive flow design and witty wordplay, Haon's tight rap, and Woodie Gochild's catchy style". "Closed Case" seems to have "upgraded the sound of Dr. Dre's 2001 in YG fashion." "The Purge" is music "full of passion and cool rhythm" where Woodie Gochild properly heightens the mood in the middle of the song and Jay Park's last verse sounds like that of Kendrick Lamar.

== Critical reception ==
Hwang Duha of Rhythmer rated the album 3.5 out of 5 stars. According to him, "Melanin Handsome", "How We Rock", "DDDD Freestyle", "Telefono Remix", "The Purge", and "Check My Bio" have "unique production, witty lyrics, and addictive hook" while "4eva", "Closed Case", "World Domination", and "No Rush" are "relatively bland and do not leave a strong impression." He concluded that "even though it has some flaws, it is an excellent compilation album where one can enjoy the best rap performances and sounds."

== Awards and nominations ==
Award	Year	Category	Result	Ref.
Korean Hip-hop Awards	2021	Hip-hop Album of the Year	Nominated	

== Track listing ==
No.	Title	Lyrics	Music	Arrangement	Length
1.	"H1ghr"	G.Soul, Jay Park	GroovyRoom, Cha Cha Malone	GroovyRoom, Cha Cha Malone	3:18
2.	"Melanin Handsome"	Sik-K	SMMT, Sik-K	SMMT	2:30
3.	"How We Rock"	Jay Park, pH-1, Sik-K, Big Naughty, Trade L, Haon, Woodie Gochild	GroovyRoom, Boycold	GroovyRoom, Boycold	4:40
4.	"DDDD Freestyle" (뚝딱 Freestyle)	Sik-K, Big Naughty, Woodie Gochild, Haon, Trade L	Boycold, GroovyRoom, Adam King Feeney	Boycold, GroovyRoom	3:31
5.	"4eva"	Jay Park, Woodie Gochild, pH-1, Trade L, Haon, Sik-K	Woogie, DJ Wegun	Woogie, DJ Wegun	3:24
6.	"Teléfono Remix"	pH-1, Haon, Woodie Gochild, Jay Park, Sik-K, Trade L, Big Naughty	Woogie	Woogie	4:06
7.	"Closed Case"	pH-1, Jay Park, Trade L, Haon, Sik-K, Woodie Gochild	Woogie	Woogie	4:10
8.	"World Domination"	Jay Park, Haon, Sik-K, pH-1	Gray, Dax	Gray, Dax	3:42
9.	"The Purge"	Jay Park, pH-1, Big Naughty, Woodie Gochild, Haon, Trade L, Sik-K	GroovyRoom	GroovyRoom	3:41
10.	"No Rush"	Sik-K, pH-1, Haon, Jay Park, Woodie Gochild	Goosebumps	Goosebumps	3:29
11.	"Check My Bio"	Jay Park, Woodie Gochild, pH-1, Haon, Ourealgoat	GroovyRoom	GroovyRoom	4:02
12.	"Dance Like Jay Park Remix"	Ted Park, Jay Park, Parlay Pass	Crookid	Crookid	4:01
13.	"Team"	Sik-K, pH-1, Woodie Gochild, Trade L, Jay Park	Bronze, Boycold	Bronze, Boycold	4:47
14.	"The Arrival" (도착)	Sik-K, pH-1, Woodie Gochild, Haon, Trade L, Jay Park	Vangdale	Vangdale	4:11
Total length:					53:32

== Charts ==
Chart (2020)	Peak position
South Korean Albums (Gaon)	15

== Sales ==
Region	Sales
South Korea	7,661
