= But for Now Leave Me Alone =

Studio album by pH-1
- Released: September 15, 2022
- Genres: House, hip hop, R&B
- Length: 40:57
- Label: H1ghr Music

PH-1 chronology
X (2020)	But for Now Leave Me Alone (2022)

Singles from But for Now Leave Me Alone
- 1. "Mr. Bad" Released: August 9, 2022

But for Now Leave Me Alone (stylized in all caps) is the second studio album of American rapper pH-1. It was released on September 15, 2022, through H1ghr Music.

== Background ==
In an interview with Eyesmag, pH-1 explained the inspiration behind the album.

People often think of me as a 'bright', 'sweet', and 'soft' person. In this album, I wanted to reveal the dark side of me that was not seen by the public. I wanted to change my image too. Therefore, I changed the overall visuals to match the mood of the song.

== Music and lyrics ==
But for Now Leave Me Alone features songs with a touch of pop. "Zombies" has up-tempo rhythm and smooth melody arrangement in the chorus while "Yuppie Ting" borrows from UK garage sound. On "Mr. Bad", pH-1 emphasizes the image of the attractive playboy with laid-back raps.

Lyricwise, pH-1 "flips through the anthology of his life, delineating his brush with failed relationship attempts, battling his inner demons, stardom's double-edged sword and more."

== Critical reception ==
Professional ratings
Review scores
Source	Rating
Rhythmer	3/5 stars
Seoul Therapy	9/10

Hwang Du-ha of Rhythmer rated the album 3 out of 5 stars. According to him, the charm of But for Now Leave Me Alone is its sophisticated and elegant production. However, because of pH-1's monotonous rap performance, "the more you listen to it attentively, the more you lose interest in it."

Catherine Parker of Seoul Therapy gave the album 9 out of 10 points. According to her, it "encompasses pH-1's music tastes by including genres and sounds that he listens to and loves, allowing him to showcase his skills as a singer, rapper, and above all, a storyteller."

Jang Jun-hwan of IZM rated "Mr. Bad" 3 out of 5 stars. According to him, it is a pre-release that "draws attention even without a definite impact." He concluded that pH-1 proves again that he is an "all-rounder" who can fit into any song.

=== Year-end lists ===
Publication	List	Rank	Ref.
Rolling Stone India	15 Best Korean Hip-Hop and R&B Albums of 2022	12	

== Track listing ==
All tracks are written by pH-1.

No.	Title	Lyrics	Music	Length
1.	"Zombies"		Smmt	3:04
2.	"TGIF"		Peejay	3:16
3.	"Yuppie Ting" (featuring Blase)	Blase	BlackDoe	3:00
4.	"Tipsy"		Sumin	3:20
5.	"Mr. Bad" (featuring Woo Won-jae)	Woo Won-jae	Woo Won-jae, Sumin	3:05
6.	"Juliette!" (featuring Umi)	Umi	Umi, Moocean	3:06
7.	"Run Away"		Hoiwave	2:57
8.	"Dead Girl"		Vangdale	3:22
9.	"Shrink Told Me" (featuring Mokyo)		Mokyo	2:29
10.	"Issues" (featuring Paloalto)	Paloalto	Peejay	3:23
11.	"Break the Glass"		Slom	3:31
12.	"Final Bout" (마지막 싸움; Majimak ssaum) (featuring Los)	Los	Nutty	2:51
13.	"Bve" (배)		Hoiwave	3:28
Total length:				37:08

== Charts ==
Chart (2022)	Peak position
South Korean Albums (Circle)	24
