= High School Rapper season 4 =

2021 South Korean survival TV show

High School Rapper
- Season 4
- Native name
- Hangul: 고등래퍼 4
- RR: Godeungnaepeo 4
- MR: Kodŭngnaep'ŏ 4
- No. of episodes: 10

Release
- Original network: Mnet
- Original release: February 19 – April 23, 2021

Season chronology
- ← Previous; Season 3

The fourth season of High School Rapper (Korean: 고등래퍼4), a 2021 South Korean survival hip hop TV show. On October 28, 2020, Mnet revealed a short teaser video for the fourth season of the survival show. It aired on Mnet every Friday at 11PM (KST) starting February 19. It was hosted by Nucksal.

== Season overview ==
=== Mentor teams ===
Simon Dominic X Loco, The Quiett X Yumdda, Jay Park X Woogie X pH-1, Changmo X Way Ched.

== Episodes ==
=== Ep. 1-2: Roll Call: Solo Performance ===
Overall Rankings
Order	Rank	Grade	Student	Score
26	1	1st	Kim Woo-rim (D.Ark)	358
24	2	1st	Kang Seo-bin (Yung Chens)	333
21	3	3rd	Yoon Ji-ho (obiegogle)	332
16	4	2nd	Kim Min-woo (M1NU)	317
19	4	3rd	Song Min-jae (Pluma)	317
25	5	1st	Lee Seung-hoon (Trade L)	306
17	6	2nd	Jeon Hyun-joon (Veinyfl)	305
1	7	2nd	Lee Jeong-woon (YLN Foreign)	303
12	8	Pre	Kwon Oh-sun	294
	9	2nd	Oh Ju-an (Joa)	292
9	10	2nd	Roh Yoon-ha (Jam1e)	291
8	11	3rd	Lee Jung-hyun	290
6	12	Pre	Park Hyeon-jin	285
5	13	Pre	Choo Hyeon-seung (nobbaggu)	277
20	14	2nd	Park Kang-baek (baegie)	276
3	15	1st	Lee Sang-jae (lil nekh)	263
4	16	Pre	Kim Da-hyeon (lil bemo)	259
22	17	3rd	Yeom Tae-gyun (Tag)	254
2	18	1st	Hwang Se-hyeon (H3hyeon)	239
14	19	1st	Kim Jin-hyeok (Bangsasun)	228
	20	3rd	Lee Ye-chan ($ice)	227
15	20	2nd	Kang Joseph (YoBoy)	227
23	21	2nd	Kim Jae-ha (jaeha)	225
	22	1st	Choi Eun-seo	218
18	23	2nd	Lee Do-hoon (Asthma)	217
	24	1st	Nam Jun-hyeok	204
	25	3rd	Choi Gyu-hyuk	177
13	26	2nd	Kim Hyeon-jik (T-co)	174
	27	2nd	Ji Hyeon-min	172
	28	Pre	Lee Young-woong	168
10	29	2nd	Kim Se-hyeon	166
	30	1st	Lee Jun-hwi	158
11	31	1st	Bang Jun-hyuk (Win)	155
	32	3rd	Jeong Hwan-hwi	154
7	33	2nd	Heo Won-hyuk (Bruninho)	45
n/a	??	2nd	Kim Chan-yeong (juto)	N/A
n/a	??	2nd	Kim Gyu-ha (rei)	N/A
n/a	??	3rd	Shin Jeong-min (Louis Kid)	N/A
n/a	??	3rd	Hwang Byeong-min	N/A
n/a	??	3rd	Kang Hyun (Tendo)	removed

No eliminations were held this round.

Indicates student performance not shown.

¤ Student Kang Hyun (Tendo) is not shown throughout this episode due to a scandal involving sexual assault

Honour Students
Grade	Student	Score
1st	Kang Seo-bin (Young Chens)	333
1st	Lee Seung-hoon (Trade L)	332
1st	Kim Woo-rim (d.ark)	358
2nd	Kim Min-woo (M1nu)	317
2nd	Jeon Hyun-joon (Veiniyfl)	305
2nd	Lee Jeong-woon (YLN Foreign)	303
3rd	Yoon Ji-ho (obiegogle)	332
3rd	Song Min-jae (Pluma)	317

=== Ep. 2-3: Grade Cypher: solo performance ===
Groups of 4 or 5 were created in each grade level and 2 rappers were eliminated each round. The groups with the highest combined scores from the Previous round were able to pick their opponents for the round and beats cypher.

Grade & Group	Students	vs.	Grade & Group	Students	Eliminated Students
2nd Grade, Group 3	Kang Joseph (YoBoy), Kim Min-woo (M1nu), Roh Yoon-ha (Jam1e), Oh Ju-an (Joa) & Ji Hyeon-min	vs.	3rd Grade, Group 1	Song Min-jae (Pluma), Yeom Tae-gyun (Tag), Lee Ye-chan ($ice), Jeong Hwan-hwi & Choi Gyu-hyuk	Choi Gyu-hyuk Jeong Hwan-hwi
Pre High School Grade, Group 1	Kwon Oh-sun, Kim Da-hyeon (lil bemo), Park Hyeon-jin, Lee Young-woong & Choo Hyeon-seung (nobbaggu)	vs.	1st Grade, Group 2	Kim Woo-rim (d.ark), Choi Eun-seo, Lee Sang-jae (lil nekh), Bang Joon-hyuk (Win) & Kim Jin-hyeok (Bangsasun)	Lee Young-woong Bang Joon-hyuk (Win)
1st Grade, Group 1	Kang Seo-bin (Young Chens), Lee Seung-hoon (Trade L), Hwang Se-hyeon (H3hyeon), Lee Jun-hwi & Nam Jun-hyeok	vs.	2nd Grade, Group 2	Kim Jae-ha (jaeha), Jeon Hyun-joon (Veiniyfl), Park Kang-baek (baegie), Kim Hyeon-jik (T-co) & Kim Se-hyeon	Lee Jun-hwi Kim Se-hyeon
3rd Grade, Group 2	Lee Jung-hyun, Shin Jeong-min (Louis Kid), Yoon Ji-ho (obiegogle), Kang Hyun (Tendo) & Hwang Byeong-min	vs.	2nd Grade, Group 1	Kim Gyu-ha (rei), Kim Chan-yeong (juto), Lee Do-hoon (Asthma), Lee Jeong-woon (YLN Foreign), & Heo Won-hyuk (Bruninho)	Hwang Byeong-min Kim Chan-yeong (juto)

Eliminated from the show

¤ Student Kang Hyun (Tendo) is not shown throughout this episode due to a scandal involving sexual assault

Honour Students
Grade	Student
Pre	Kwon Oh-sun
1st	Kang Seo-bin (Young Chens)
1st	Lee Sang-jae (lil nekh)
1st	Hwang Se-hyeon (H3hyeon)
2nd	Lee Jeong-woon (YLN Foreign)
2nd	Lee Do-hoon (Asthma)
2nd	Roh Yoon-ha (Jam1e)
2nd	Ji Hyeon-min

=== Ep. 3-4: Group Evaluation ===
The 8 honour students from the previous round were made group captains, the captains choose their beat along with any students they wanted to be a part of their group.

Out of the 8 teams, the 4 teams with the highest score would be safe from eliminations however, the bottom 4 teams had 2 members were eliminated.

Group Leader + Members	Beat	Highest Score	Lowest Score	Eliminated Students
Kang Seo-bin (Young Chens), Lee Seung-hoon (Trade L), Park Hyeon-jin & Kim Woo-rim (d.ark)	"Hangang Gang" - The Quiett (Prod. by Prima Vista & Chang Suk-hoon)	100	95	N/A
Hwang Se-hyeon (H3hyeon), Kim Jae-ha (jaeha), Kim Da-hyeon (lil bemo) & Song Min-jae (Pluma)	"Wayclef Jean" - Young Thug (Prod. by TM88 & Supah Mario)	100	88	N/A
Lee Do-hoon (Asthma), Kang Joseph (YoBoy), Kim Hyeon-jik (T-co) & Oh Ju-an (Joa)	"Drop it like it's hot" - Snoop Dogg (Prod. by The Neptunes)	80	60	Lee Do-hoon (Asthma) Oh Ju-an (Joa)
Roh Yoon-ha (Jam1e), Yeom Tae-gyun (Tag), Shin Jeong-min (Louis Kid) & Lee Ye-chan ($ice)	"GOTT" - Simon Dominic (Prod. by Goosebumps)	85	78	Yeom Tae-gyun (Tag) Lee Ye-chan ($ice)
Ji Hyeon-min, Heo Won-hyuk (Bruninho), Kim Min-woo (M1nu) & Jeon Hyun-joon (Veiniyfl)	"GOTT" - Simon Dominic (Prod. by Goosebumps)	90	75	Ji Hyeon-min Jeon Hyun-joon (Veiniyfl)
Lee Jeong-woon (YLN Foreign), Kim Gyu-ha (rei), Choo Hyeon-seung (nobbaggu) & Kang Hyun (Tendo)	"Backseat Freestyle" - Kendrick Lamar (Prod. by Hit-Boy)	91	82	N/A
Kwon Oh-sun, Park Kang-baek (Baegie), Nam Jun-hyuk, & Lee Jung-hyun	"Backseat Freestyle" - Kendrick Lamar (Prod. by Hit-Boy)	80	67	Kwon Oh-sun Nam Jun-hyuk
Lee Sang-jae (lil nekh), Choi Eun-seo, Yoon Ji-ho (obiegogle) & Kim Jin-hyeok (Bangsasun)	"돈 Call Me" - Yumdda (Prod. by BRLLNT)	95	90	N/A

Indicates the top 4 teams, with all group members advancing to the next round.

Indicates bottom four teams, with two members of their team being eliminated.

Indicates the eliminated student.

¤ Student Kang Hyun (Tendo) is not shown throughout this episode due to a scandal involving sexual assault

=== Ep. 4-5: 1:1 Theme Battle ===
Students picked their topic through a random card drawing. Whenever two students picked the same theme card they were placed to battle against each other

Topic	Student	vs.	Student	Eliminated Student(s)
SNS	Heo Won-hyuk (Bruninho)	vs.	Lee Jung-hyun	Lee Jung-hyun
Middle school 2nd grade illness	Kim Jae-ha (jaeha)	vs.	Kang Joseph (YoBoy)	Kang Joseph (YoBoy)
ilsang (day-to-day life)	Park Hyeon-jin	vs.	Kim Min-woo (M1nu)	Kim Min-woo (M1nu)
Family	Kim Da-hyeon (lil bemo)	vs.	Kim Woo-rim (d.ark)	Kim Woo-rim (d.ark)
Happiness	Kim Gyu-ha (rei)	vs.	Yoon Ji-ho (obiegogle)	Kim Gyu-ha (rei)
Flex	Lee Jeong-woon (YLN Foreign)	vs.	Choi Eun-seo	Choi Eun-seo
Dream	Kang Seo-bin (Young Chens)	vs.	Hwang Se-hyeon (H3hyeon)	Hwang Se-hyeon (H3hyeon)
Secret	Park Kang-baek (baegie)	vs.	Roh Yoon-ha (Jam1e)	Park Kang-baek (baegie)
Friends	Lee Seung-hoon (Trade L)	vs.	Kim Hyeon-jik (T-co)	Kim Hyeon-jik (T-co)
Adult	Lee Sang-jae (lil nekh)	vs.	Shin Jeong-min (Louis Kid)	Shin Jeong-min (Louis Kid)
School	Song Min-jae (Pluma)	vs.	Kang Hyun (Tendo)	Kang Hyun (Tendo)
First Love	Kim Jin-hyeok (Bangsasun)	vs	Choo Hyeon-seung (nobbaggu)	Kim Jin-hyeok (Bangsasun)

Indicates the eliminated student.

¤ Student Kang Hyun (Tendo) is not shown throughout this episode due to a scandal involving sexual assault

¤ Blue boxes indicate pairings where rematches were required due to a 2:2 tie in votes

Honour Students
Grade	Student
2nd	Lee Jeong-woon (YLN Foreign)
Pre	Kim Da-hyeon (lil bemo)
2nd	Roh Yoon-ha (Jam1e)
1st	Kang Seo-bin (Young Chens)

==== Revival Round ====
At the end of this round it was revealed that 6 of the eliminated students were picked to perform a verse a cappella. From the 6 chosen only 4 were revived.

Student	Pass/Fail
Kim Woo-rim (d.ark)	Pass
Choi Eun-seo	Fail
Park Kang-baek (baegie)	Pass
Kang Joseph (YoBoy)	Pass
Kim Min-woo (M1nu)	Fail
Hwang Se-hyeon (H3hyeon)	Pass

Indicates the student revived.

Indicates the eliminated student.

=== Ep. 5 – 6: Mentor Group Selection ===
Before group selections each mentor group held 1:1 interviews with the remaining 16 students. The 4 honour students were given the option to choose their mentor group, for the remaining 12 students each mentor team recruited who they wanted and if a student had more than one mentor group that wanted them they were given the freedom to choose.

Team	Mentors	Students
AOMG	Simon Dominic X Loco	Lee Sang-jae (lil nekh), Heo Won-hyuk (Bruninho), Roh Yoon-ha (Jam1e) & Kang Joseph (YoBoy)
Daytona Entertainment	The Quiett X Yumdda,	Kim Jae-ha (jaeha), Choo Hyeon-seung (nobbaggu), Hwang Se-hyeon (H3hyeon) & Yoon Ji-ho (obiegogle)
H1ghr Music	Jay Park X Woogie X pH-1	Lee Jeong-woon (YLN Foreign), Park Hyeon-jin, Kim Da-hyeon (lil bemo) & Song Min-jae (Pluma)
Ambition Musik	Changmo X Way Ched	Kang Seo-bin (Young Chens), Lee Seung-hoon (Trade L), Kim Woo-rim (d.ark) & Park Kang-baek (baegie)

=== Ep. 6: Team Battle: Group ===
For the group mission, the team members made a song using the beat prepared by the mentors. The mentors randomly selected their groups opponent and one student from the losing team was eliminated.

The guest judges included Verbal Jint, Swings, Zion T., Paloalto, Deepflow, Hangzoo, Boi B

The Quiett X Yumdda	Song	vs.	Simon Dominic X Loco	Song	Eliminated Student
Kim Jae-ha (jaeha), Choo Hyeon-seung (nobbaggu), Hwang Se-hyeon (H3hyeon) & Yoon Ji-ho (obiegogle)	"Elizabeth 엘리자베스"		Lee Sang-jae (lil nekh), Heo Won-hyuk (Bruninho), Roh Yoon-ha (Jam1e) & Kang Joseph (YoBoy)	"Big Big Big"	Yoon Ji-ho (obiegogle)
Changmo X Way Ched	Song	vs.	Jay Park X Woogie X pH-1	Song	Eliminated Student
Kang Seo-bin (Young Chens), Lee Seung-hoon (Trade L), Kim Woo-rim (D.Ark) & Park Kang-baek (baegie)	"Backpack"		Lee Jeong-woon (YLN Foreign), Park Hyeon-jin, Kim Da-hyeon (lil bemo) & Song Min-jae (Pluma)	"Green Light"	Song Min-jae (Pluma)

Eliminated from the show

Winning Team

Losing Team

In February 2021 while the show was still being recorded, Pluma shared to his close friends list on Instagram that he was going to be on a song with Jay Park which one of his friends screenshotted and posted to on online forum, revealing that Min-jae was on Jay Park's team. As giving any spoilers to the show is prohibited, it is believed that the "evil" editing of episode 6 was in response to his violation of the rule. After the episode was broadcast, Pluma received various hate messages and threats on his Instagram account, which led him to disable his comments.

=== Ep. 7-8: Team Battle: Textbook Rap Battle ===
Unlike the previous seasons, students had to choose a topic from any textbook and write a song about it.

There were two rounds of voting and for groups that lost, only one of them were allowed to pass and the other one disqualified.

This episode had 20 guest judges including Donutman, Khakii, Munchman, Layone, Basick, Zizo, Hanhae, Kebee, Viceversa, Choi LB, Ja Mezz, skyminhyuk, Black Nine, Heo Seong-hyun, MckDaddy, Bryn, Dbo, Ahn Byung-woong, Qwala & O'domar.

Simon Dominic X Loco	Song	vs.	Changmo X Way Ched	Song	Eliminated Students
Kang Joseph (YoBoy) & Roh Yoon-ha (Jam1e)	"Methane Hydrate"		Kim Woo-rim (d.ark) & Park Kang-baek (baegie)	"Number of Cases"	Kang Joseph (YoBoy)
Jay Park X WoogTeamie X pH-1	Song	vs.	The Quiett X Yumdda	Song	Eliminated Students
Park Hyeon-jin & Kim Da-hyeon (lil bemo)	"WORK!"		Kim Jae-ha (jaeha) & Hwang Se-hyeon (H3hyeon)	"Chris Brown Moves"	Hwang Se-hyeon (H3hyeon)
Simon Dominic X Loco	Song	vs.	Changmo X Way Ched	Song	Eliminated Students
Lee Sang-jae (lil nekh) & Heo Won-hyuk (Bruninho)	"Emoji"		Kang Seo-bin (Young Chens) & Lee Seung-hoon (Trade L)	"Jeon Woochi"	Kang Seo-bin (Young Chens)
The Quiett X Yumdda	Song	vs.	Jay Park X WoogTeamie X pH-1	Song	Eliminated Students
Choo Hyeon-seung (nobbaggu)	"Choo Religion"		Lee Jeong-woon (YLN Foreign)	"DNA"	Choo Hyeon-seung (nobbaggu)

Eliminated from the show

Winning Group

Losing Group

=== Ep. 8-9: Semi Finals ===
The special audience for this episode included 16 rappers: untell, Vinxen, Yenjamin, Young Kay, Rohann, unofficialboyy, Chin Chilla, BlueWhale, Lee Dong-min, Cloudybay, Pullik, Hotchkiss, GI$T, Ellick, Goi & Johny Kwony

Place	Simon Dominic X Loco Team	Song	Score
9	Heo Won-hyuk (Bruninho)	"Meu Tempo"	145
5	Roh Yoon-ha (Jam1e)	"Bow wow"	191
4	Lee Sang-jae (lil nekh)	"Red Light"	202
	Changmo X Way Ched Team	Song	Score
8	Park Kang-baek (baegie)	"Kiri Kiri"	156
3	Kim Woo-rim (d.ark)	"Cold"	207
1	Lee Seung-hoon (Trade L)	"SUPERNOVA"	218
	Jay Park X WoogTeamie X pH-1 Team	Song	Score
10	Lee Jeong-woon (YLN Foreign)	"CALL ME"	140
2	Park Hyeon-jin	"PARADISE"	216
6	Kim Da-hyeon (lil bemo)	"ISLAND BOYS"	169
	The Quiett X Yumdda Team	Song	Score
7	Kim Jae-ha (jaeha)	"I'M FINE"	167

Eliminated from the show

Finalist

=== Ep. 10: Finals ===
Place	Student	Song	Score
4	Park Hyeon-jin	"Intro"	370
3	Kim Woo-rim (D.Ark)	"Do My Best"	413
2	Roh Yoon-ha (Jam1e)	"Self-Check"	420
5	Lee Sang-jae (lil nekh)	"NARO"	302
1	Lee Seung-hoon (Trade L)	"Ooh Wah"	424

== Track listing ==
Mentors [From "School Rapper 4 Episode 0"] - Single
No.	Title	Music	Artists	Length
1.	"Mentors" (멘토스)	Way Ched, WOOGIE	The Quiett, Simon Dominic, Nucksal, Jay Park, Loco, PH-1, Changmo, Yumdda, Way Ched, Woogie	5:16
Total length:				05:16

School Rapper 4 - Team Battle : Group - EP
No.	Title	Music	Artist(s)	Length
1.	"Elizabeth" (엘리자베스)		H3hyeon, JAEHA, Obiegogle, Nobbaggu	03:41
2.	"Big Big Big"	noisemaster minsu	Noh Yoon-ha, YoBoy, Heo Won-hyuk, Lil Nekh feat. Simon Dominic	04:30
3.	"Backpack"	Way Ched	Young Chens, Trade L, Baegie & D.ark feat. Changmo	04:12
4.	"Green Light"	WOOGIE	YLN Foreign, Park Hyeon-jin, Lil Bemo & Pluma feat. Jay Park & PH-1	04:01
Total length:				16:26

School Rapper 4 - Team Battle : Textbook Rap Battle - EP
No.	Title	Music	Artists	Length
1.	"Methane Hydrate" (녹아줄게)	Gray	Noh Yoon-ha, YoBoy	3:40
2.	"Number of Cases" (경우의 수)	Way Ched	D.ark, Baegie feat. Changmo	3:46
3.	"WORK!"	WOOGIE	Lil Bemo, Park Hyun-jin	3:50
4.	"Chris Brown Moves"		JAEHA, H3hyeon	2:53
5.	"Emoji" (이모티콘)	Gray	Lil Nekh, Heo Won-hyuk	3:32
6.	"Jeon Woochi" (전우치)	Way Ched	Trade L, Young Chens feat. Changmo	3:16
7.	"Choo Religion" (추 Religion)	Anti Social Kid & YUMDDA	nobbaggu feat. Yumdda	2:59
8.	"DNA"	Cha Cha Malone & WOOGIE	YLN Foreign feat. Jay Park	3:08
Total length:				27:05

School Rapper 4 Semi Final
No.	Title	Music	Artists	Length
1.	"Meu Tempo"	Gray	Heo Won-hyuk feat, BIBI & Simon Dominic	3:17
2.	"Kiri Kiri" (끼리끼리)	Way Ched	Baegie feat. Zene The Zilla	3:26
3.	"Cold"	Way Ched	D.ark feat Superbee	4:01
4.	"Bow Wow" (왈왈)	GooseBumps	Noh Yoon-ha feat. Blase, Coogie & Simon Dominic	3:18
Total length:				14:04

School Rapper4 Semi Final 2
No.	Title	Music	Artists	Length
1.	"CALL ME"	WOOGIE	YLN Foreign feat. SOGUMM	3:24
2.	"Red Light"	Code Kunst	Lil Nekh feat. BIG Naughty	4:30
3.	"I'M FINE"	Kieine, Yumdda, The Quiett	Jaeha feat. Yumdda	2:38
4.	"PARADISE"	WOOGIE	Park Hyeon-jin feat. meenoi	3:33
5.	"ISLAND BOYS"	WOOGIE, Unsinkable	Lil Bemo feat. sokodomo & pH-1	3:17
6.	"SUPERNOVA"	Changmo	Trade L feat. Changmo, G.Soul & DUT2	3:36
Total length:				21:00

School Rapper4 Final
No.	Title	Music	Artists	Length
1.	"INTRO"	WOOGIE	Park Hyeon-jin feat. Jay Park	3:34
2.	"Do My Best"	Way Ched	D.ark feat. Jessi	3:29
3.	"Self-Check"	Gray	Noh Yoon-ha feat. Nucksal	3:29
4.	"Naro" (나로호)	noisemasterminsu	Lil Nekh feat. Loco & Simon Dominic	4:13
5.	"Ooh Wah"	Way Ched	Trade L feat. Changmo & Wonstein	4:20
6.	"Mentors (Remix)"		Choi Eun-seo, YoBoy, M1NU & Kwon Oh-sun	4:36
Total length:				23:41

== Ratings ==
Average TV viewership ratings
Ep.	Original broadcast date	Average audience share
Ep.	Original broadcast date	Nielsen Korea (Nationwide)
1	February 19, 2021	0.776% (37th)
2	February 26, 2021	0.831% (33rd)
3	March 5, 2021	0.56% (67th)
4	March 12, 2021	0.45% (93rd)
5	March 19, 2021	0.358% (114th)
6	March 26, 2021	0.38% (96th)
7	April 2, 2021	0.413% (92nd)
8	April 9, 2021	0.543% (64th)
9	April 16, 2021	0.467% (75th)
10	April 23, 2021	0.508% (71st)
In the table above, the blue numbers represent the lowest ratings and the red numbers represent the highest ratings.
