= Bucket list =

Bucket list may refer to:

- A list of activities to do before dying (i.e. "kick the bucket")
- The Bucket List, a 2007 comedy film that coined the term
- Bucket List (2018 film), a 2018 Indian Marathi comedy-drama film
- The Bucket List, series 2 of the British travel documentary series An Idiot Abroad
- "Bucket List" (song), a 2013 single by Nelly Furtado
- "Bucket List", a 2020 song from the Dean Brody album Boys
- Bucket List (EP), a 2021 EP by Big Naughty

== See also ==
- Wish list
