= Loopy (rapper) =

South Korean rapper

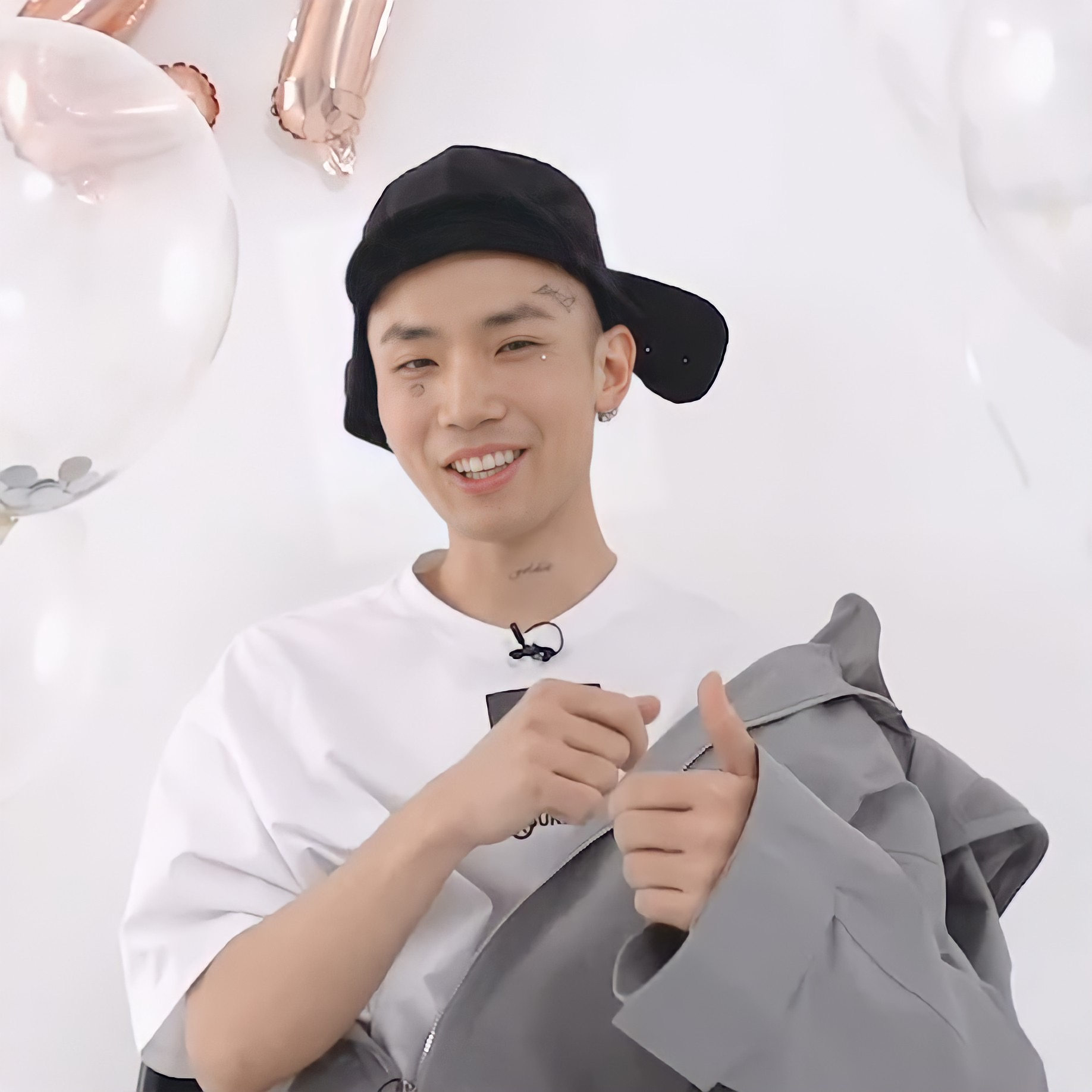
- Loopy in March 2020

Background information
- Born: Lee Jin-yong; September 9, 1987 (age 39); Seoul, South Korea
- Genre: Hip hop
- Occupation: Rapper
- Instrument: Vocals
- Years active: 2016–present
- Labels: MKIT Rain; Uncutpoint

- Korean name
- Hangul: 이진용
- RR: I Jinyong
- MR: I Chinyong

Lee Jin-yong (Korean: 이진용, born September 9, 1987), better known by his stage name Loopy (Hangul: 루피), is a South Korean rapper. He was the runner-up for Show Me the Money 777.

== Early life and education ==
Lee Jin-yong was born on September 9, 1987, in Seoul, South Korea. He has one older sister. Lee graduated from Sehwa High School, and enlisted in the South Korean military to fulfill his compulsory military service requirement. After completing his service, he moved to Los Angeles, California.

== Discography ==
=== Studio albums ===
Title	Album details	Peak chart positions	Sales
Title	Album details	KOR	Sales
No Fear	Released: April 14, 2020; Re-released: April 29, 2020 (Deluxe); Label: Uncutpoint, NHN Bugs; Formats: CD, digital download	22	KOR: 985

=== Extended plays ===
Title	Album details	Peak chart positions	Sales
Title	Album details	KOR	Sales
Ice Tape A	Released: March 4, 2017; Label: MKIT Rain, Kakao Entertainment; Formats: CD, digital download	—	—N/a
Ice	Released: April 26, 2017; Label: MKIT Rain, Kakao Entertainment; Formats: CD, digital download	32	—N/a
Questions	Released: February 7, 2018; Label: MKIT Rain, Kakao Entertainment; Formats: CD, digital download	—	—N/a
King Loopy	Released: July 5, 2018; Label: MKIT Rain, Kakao Entertainment; Formats: CD, digital download	—	—N/a
LooFla with Nafla	Released: June 10, 2019; Label: MKIT Rain, Kakao Entertainment; Formats: CD, digital download	42	KOR: 999
"—" denotes releases that did not chart.

=== Charted singles ===
Title	Year	Peak chart positions	Album
Title	Year	KOR	Album
As lead artist
"Save" feat. Paloalto	2018	8	Non-album singles
"NoNo" feat. Simon Dominic	2018	18	Non-album singles
Collaborations
"Good Day" with PH-1, Kid Milli feat. Paloalto	2018	4	Non-album singles
"119" with Nafla, PH-1, Kid Milli, OLNL, Superbee	2018	46	Non-album singles
