= Bucket List (EP) =

EP by Big Naughty
- Released: February 25, 2021
- Genre: Hip hop
- Length: 23:09
- Language: Korean
- Label: H1ghr; Kakao M

Big Naughty chronology
Bucket List (2021)	Nangman (2022)

Singles from Bucket List
- 1. "Girl at the Coffee Shop" Released: February 2, 2021

Bucket List is the debut extended play of South Korean rapper Big Naughty. It was released on February 25, 2021, by H1ghr Music.

== Singles ==
"Girl at the Coffee Shop" was pre-released on February 2, 2021.

== Music and lyrics ==
On "Joker", Big Naughty expresses the sorrow of love. On "Frank Ocean", he sings calmly on Cosmic Boy's melodic funk beat. On "Brand New World", he pays homage to Seo Taiji's "Classroom Idea" and expresses his frustration as a student. On "Bucket List", he raps speedily on the exciting synth beat produced by DPR Cream and "shows off his solid rap skills".

== Critical reception ==
Professional ratings
Review scores
Source	Rating
Rhythmer	3/5 stars
Hiphopplaya	7/10

Hwang Duha of Rhythmer rated Bucket List 3 out of 5 stars. According to him, Big Naughty showed that he can make sophisticated and witty songs. However, there is still room for improvement as the featuring artists steal the spotlight in each song.

myK_daytona of Hiphopplaya rated the EP 7 out of 10. According to him, the latter half of the EP is unpolished compared to the first four songs. Nevertheless, Big Naughty's adventurous spirit "brings a smile to his face".

== Track listing ==
No.	Title	Lyrics	Music	Arrangement	Length
1.	"Joker" (featuring Jamie)	Big Naughty, Jamie	Noden, Hoiwave, Big Naughty, Sound Kim, Jamie	Hoiwave	3:20
2.	"Frank Ocean" (featuring Sole)	Big Naughty, Sole	Cosmic Boy, Big Naughty	Cosmic Boy	3:16
3.	"Girl at the Coffee Shop" (커피가게 아가씨; Keopigage agassi) (featuring Wonstein)	Big Naughty, Wonstein	Peejay, Big Naughty, Wonstein	Peejay	3:05
4.	"Brand New World" (멋진 신세계; Meotjin sinsegye) (featuring Rohann)	Big Naughty, Rohann, Seo Taiji	Peejay, Big Naughty, Seo Taiji	Peejay	3:20
5.	"10 Years Later" (10년 후; 10nyeon hu) (featuring Paloalto)	Big Naughty, Paloalto	Minit, Big Naughty, Paloalto	Minit	3:27
6.	"Bravo" (부라보) (featuring Coogie and G.Soul)	Big Naughty, Coogie, G.Soul	Gray, Dax, Perro, Big Naughty, Coogie, G.Soul	Gray, Dax, Perro	4:03
7.	"Bucket List"	Big Naughty	DPR Cream, Big Naughty	DPR Cream	2:38
Total length:					23:09

== Charts ==
Chart (2021)	Peak position
South Korean Albums (Gaon)	31

== Sales ==
Region	Sales
South Korea	10,615
