= Zior Park =

South Korean rapper (born 1994)

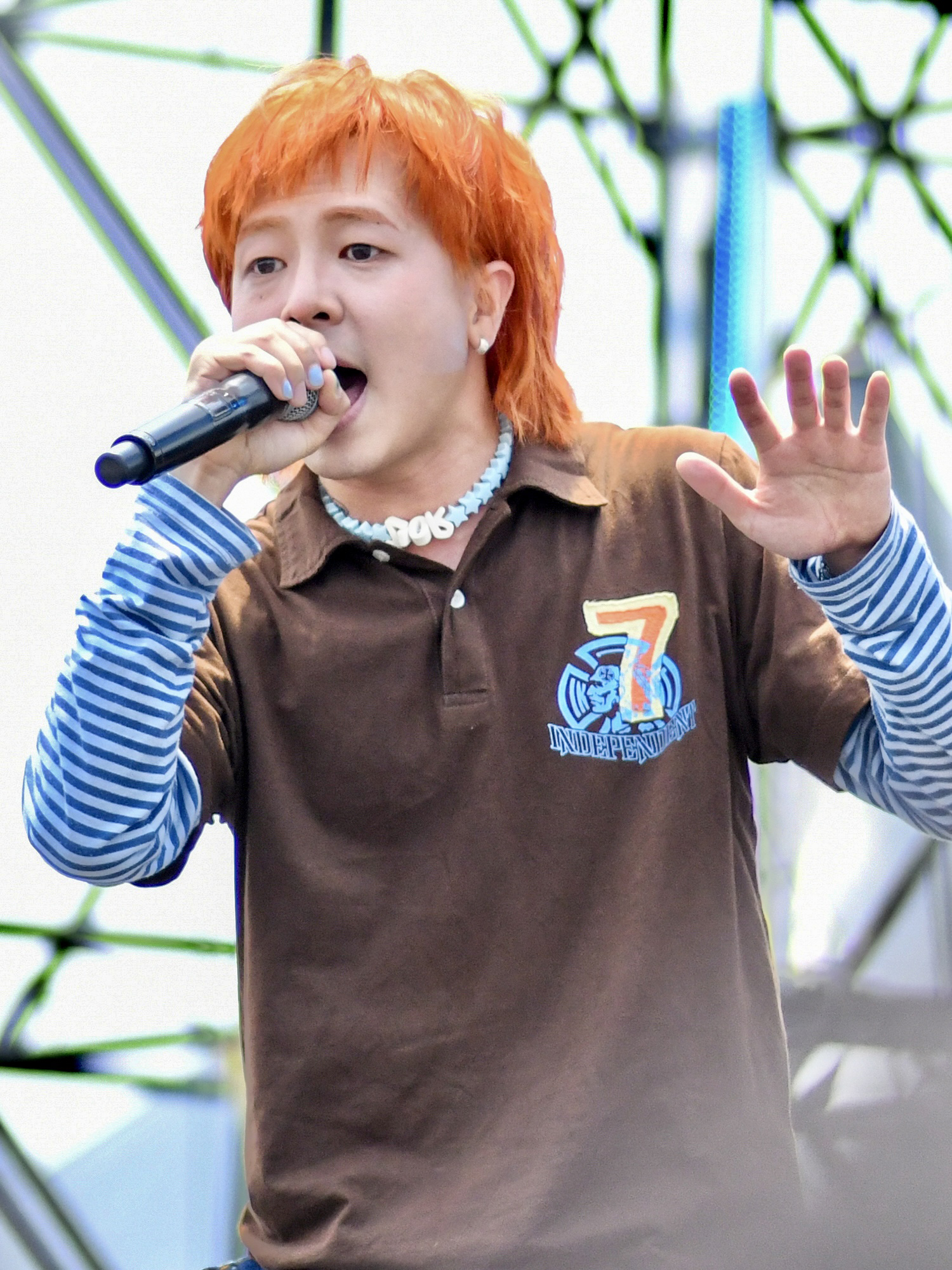
- Park in 2022

Background information
- Also known as: Chuck Blueman; Chet Black
- Born: Park Ji-won; October 11, 1994 (age 31)
- Genres: Hip hop; R&B
- Occupations: Rapper; music video director
- Instruments: Vocals
- Years active: 2018–present
- Labels: Beautiful Noise

Korean name
- Hangul: 박지원
- Hanja: 朴智元
- RR: Bak Jiwon
- MR: Pak Chiwŏn

Park Ji-won (Korean: 박지원; born October 11, 1994), better known by his stage name Zior Park (Korean: 지올팍), is a South Korean rapper and music video director.

== Life and career ==
=== Early life and career beginnings ===
Zior Park was born Park Ji-won on October 11, 1994. He graduated from an information technology (IT) high school and attended an engineering university for one semester before quitting. Park moved to the United States in his early 20s and lived in New York and San Francisco, California, with the intent of meeting angel investors with a proposal to create a music startup company in Silicon Valley. Following a dispute with the friends in South Korea who were drafting the plan, the proposal fell through and Park never received it. Unable to keep up with rent, he became homeless and lived in his car for a month. At that time, he was a fan of Big Sean and took note of how his songs topped charts. Park decided to become a rapper and returned to his home country.

=== Career ===
Park released the collaborative single "Noise" with Mommy Son and Kim Seung-min on May 14, 2019. He released his first full-length album Thunderbird Motel and its two lead singles "Sleepwalk" and "Can't Stop This Thunder" in March 2020. Park released his first mini-album Where Does Sasquatch Live? Part 1 on February 16, 2023. The lead single "Christian" is an alternative rock track which satirically points out how everyone lives in a contradictory manner. A month after its release, the song entered and gradually rose on music charts, ultimately peaking at number seven on the national Circle Digital Chart.

== Musical style ==
Park is a hip hop and R&B musician, and he writes his lyrics entirely in English. He cites Willy Wonka of Charlie and the Chocolate Factory as his role model. He aims to sell fantasy, saying that "the elements needed for a brand includes music of course, as well as video and fashion". Park also draws inspiration by Jack Sparrow, Cruella de Vil, and Harley Quinn. As a music video director, he utilizes the monikers Chuck Blueman and Chet Black.

== Discography ==
=== Albums ===
==== Studio albums ====
Title	Details
Thunderbird Motel	Released: March 30, 2020; Label: Beautiful Noise, Sony Music Korea; Format: CD, digital download
Syndromez	Released: June 3, 2021; Label: Beautiful Noise, Genie Music, Sony Music Korea; Format: CD, digital download

==== Extended plays ====
Title	Details
Where Does Sasquatch Live? Part 1	Released: February 16, 2023; Label: Beautiful Noise, Warner Music Korea, ADA; Format: CD, digital download
Where Does Sasquatch Live? Part 2	Released: November 2, 2023; Label: Beautiful Noise, Warner Music Korea, ADA; Format: CD, digital download

=== Singles ===
==== As lead artist ====
Title	Year	Peak chart positions		Album
Title	Year	KOR Circle	KOR Billb. (Note: Includes the K-pop Hot 100 (defunct as of April 2022) and the subsequent South Korea Songs chart (launched in May 2022).)	Album
"Benefits"	2018	—	—	Non-album single
"Beautiful"	2018	—	—	Non-album single
"Noise" (with Mommy Son, Kim Seung-min, and Wonstein)	2019	—	—	Non-album single
"What Do You Do When You Play?" (놀면 뭐해?; Nolmyeon Mwohae?) (with Boi B, Gaeko, Choiza, Gray, Crush, Wonstein, Mommy Son, and Sam Kim)	2019	62	51	Yoo Flash
"Sleepwalk"	2020	—	—	Thunderbird Motel
"Can't Stop This Thunder"	2020	—	—	Thunderbird Motel
"The Ellen Show" (with Wunderkid)	2020	—	—	Michael
"Homebird"	2021	—	—	Non-album single
"Modern Fox"	2021	—	—	Syndromez
"Black Fin"	2021	—	—	Syndromez
"Christmas High"	2021	—	—	Non-album single
"Falling from the Sky"	2022	—	—	Non-album single
"Dancing on Your Body" (with Beat Someone)	2022	—	—	Non-album single
"Being Human"	2022	—	—	Non-album single
"Linger" (with LNGRS)	2022	—	—	Non-album single
"Christian"	2023	7	4	Where Does Sasquatch Live? Part 1
"Magic!"	2023	—	—	Where Does Sasquatch Live? Part 1
"Psycho Love"	2023	— (Note: "Psycho Love" did not enter the Circle Digital Chart, but peaked at number 138 on the Circle Download Chart.)	—	Non-album single
"Queen"	2023	— (Note: "Queen" did not enter the Circle Digital Chart, but peaked at number 99 on the Circle Download Chart.)	—	Non-album single
"Bye Bye Bye"	2023	—	—	Where Does Sasquatch Live? Part 2
"Bullet"	2023	—	—	Where Does Sasquatch Live? Part 2
"Space Z"	2023	—	—	Where Does Sasquatch Live? Part 2
"Ashes" (featuring Ai Tomioka)	2024	—	—	Non-album single

==== As featured artist ====
Title	Year	Album
"Bourgeois" (Big Naughty featuring Zior Park)	2021	Hang Out : HipHopPlaya Compilation Album 2021 & Instrumentals
"Active Volcano" (Mic SWG Live Ver) (Mic SWG featuring Zior Park)	2021	Mic SWG Booth

=== Guest appearances ===
Title	Year	Other performer(s)	Release
"Homebird" (Mic SWG Live Ver)	2021	Mic SWG	Mic SWG Booth
"Modern Fox" (Mic SWG Live Ver)	2021	Mic SWG	Mic SWG Booth
"Lost & Found"	2022	Boycold, Sokodomo	Daft Love
"Nocturnal Animals"	2022	Zico	Grown Ass Kid
"Blow Out"	2022	Mommy Son	Street Man Fighter (SMF) Original Vol.4 (Crew Songs)

=== Soundtrack appearances ===
Title	Year	Release
"Enough"	2022	Little Women OST
"Gotcha"	2023	Behind Your Touch OST
"Cliffhanger"	2024	Frankly Speaking OST Part.2

== Awards and nominations ==
Year	Award	Category	Nominee(s)	Result	Ref.
2021	Awards for Beatmaker Award	—N/a	Zior Park	Won	
