= Wonstein =

South Korean musician (born 1995)

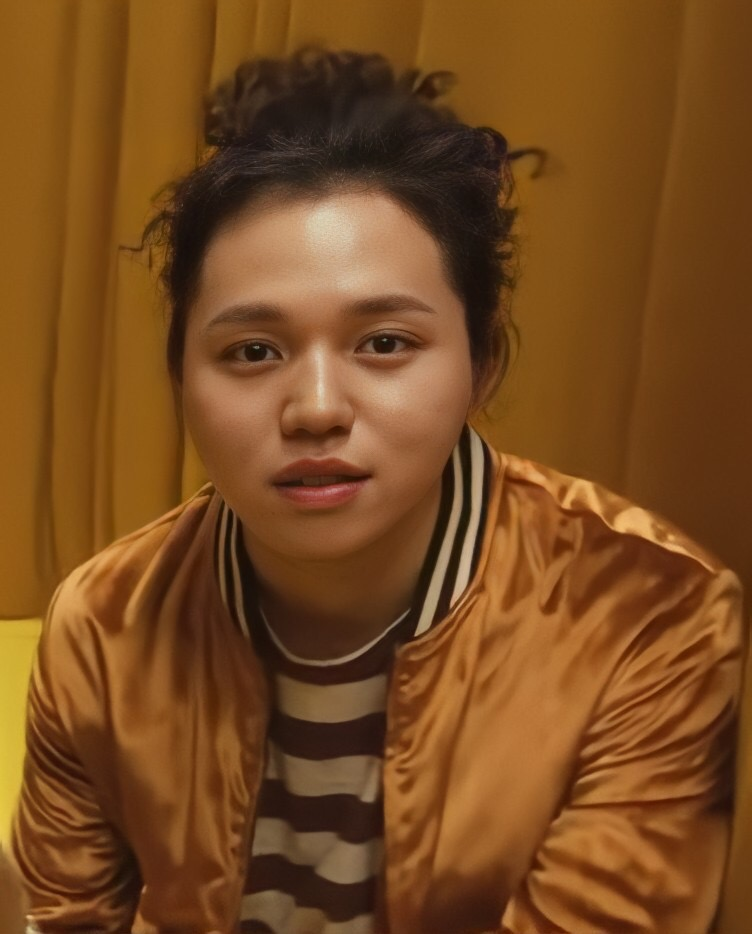

Background information
- Born: Jeong Ji-won; May 6, 1995 (age 31)
- Origin: Cheongju, South Korea
- Genres: Hip-hop; R&B
- Occupations: Rapper; singer
- Years active: 2018–present
- Label: Standard Friends
- Member of: MSG Wannabe

Korean name
- Hangul: 정지원
- RR: Jeong Jiwon
- MR: Chŏng Chiwŏn

Jeong Ji-won (Korean: 정지원; born May 6, 1995), better known by the stage name Wonstein (원슈타인) is a South Korean rapper and singer. He debuted in 2018 with the single "Spider Web" under the label Beautiful Noise. Wonstein achieved mainstream popularity after participating on the hip-hop competition show Show Me the Money 9 in 2020. The following year, he appeared on the reality show Hangout with Yoo, through which he became a member of the chart-topping R&B supergroup MSG Wannabe.

== Career ==
Wonstein contributed the track "Promise" to the original soundtrack for the Netflix series Can This Love Be Translated?, which follows the romance between interpreter Joo Ho-jin and actress Cha Mu-hee. Released on January 16, 2026, the soundtrack placed three songs on the Melon OST chart as of February 2, including Wonstein's track.

== Discography ==
=== Extended plays ===
Title	Details
Frankenstein	Released: February 20, 2019; Label: Beautiful Noise; Formats: Digital download, streaming
Zoo	Released: August 23, 2020; Label: Beautiful Noise; Formats: Digital download, streaming

=== Singles ===
List of singles, showing year released, selected chart positions, and name of the album
Title	Year	Peak chart positions		Album
Title	Year	KOR Circle	KOR Hot	Album
"Spider Web" (거미줄)	2018	—	—	Frankenstein
"Star's Name" (별의 이름) (with Homeboy)	2019	—	—	#seoulcitypopfreestyle
"Noise" (with Mommy Son, Kim Seung-min, and Zior Park)	2019	—	—	Non-album single
"How Do You Play?" (놀면 뭐해?) (with Boi B, Gaeko, Choiza, Geegooin, Gray, Crush, Mommy Son, Zior Park, and Sam Kim)	2019	62	51	Yoo-plash
"GOAT" (featuring Verbal Jint)	2020	—	—	Zoo
"3 Guineas" (3기니)	2020	—	—	Zoo
"Freak" (with Lil Boi, Chillin Homie, and Skyminhyuk)	2020	8	15	Show Me the Money 9
"Infrared Camera" (적외선 카메라)	2020	16	26	Show Me the Money 9
"No Bad Dogs" (세상에 나쁜 개는 없다) (featuring YDG and Zion.T)	2020	101	83	Show Me the Money 9
"X (Butterfly)"	2020	—	—	Non-album singles
"Friends" (with Lil Boi)	2021	52	53	Non-album singles
"Kangaroo" (캥거루)	2021	131	75	Non-album singles
"Heat" (with Lil Boi and Mirani)	2021	163	—	Non-album singles
"When Night Is Falling" (밤이 되니까) (originally by Punch)	2021	91	35	Non-album singles
"Tree" (나무)	2021	— (Note: "Tree" did not enter the Gaon Digital Chart, but it peaked at number 68 on the component Download Chart.)	—	Non-album singles
"Song for You" (진심으로 너를 위해 부르는 노래) (with Kim Yun-a)	2021	— (Note: "Song For You" did not enter the Gaon Digital Chart, but peaked at number 14 and 41 on the components BGM Chart and Download Chart, respectively.)	—	Non-album singles
"Love Theory" (with Taeyong)	2022	139	—	Non-album singles
"Love Song" (with Joy)	2022	—	—	World Peace Project
"It's Not Beautiful and It Doesn't Hurt" (안 아름답고도 안 아프구나)	2024	177	—	Non-album single
"—" denotes a recording that did not chart or was not released in that territory.

=== Soundtrack appearances ===
List of soundtrack appearances, showing year released, selected chart positions, and name of the album
Title	Year	Peak chart positions		Album
Title	Year	KOR Circle	KOR Hot	Album
"Your Existence" (존재만으로)	2022	16	19	Twenty-Five Twenty-One OST
"Tuning In to You" (기울이면)	2022	— (Note: "Tuning In to You" did not enter the Circle Digital Chart, but peaked at number 32 and 47 on the components BGM Chart and Download Chart, respectively.)	—	Extraordinary Attorney Woo OST
"Promise"	2026	125	—	Can This Love Be Translated? OST
"—" denotes a recording that did not chart or was not released in that territory.

=== Other charted songs ===
List of other charted songs, showing year released, selected chart positions, and name of the album
Title	Year	Peak chart positions		Album
Title	Year	KOR Circle	KOR Hot	Album
"F The World" (사랑은) (Mommy Son feat. Wonstein)	2019	105	99	My Sadness
"Ooh Wah" (Trade L featuring Changmo, Wonstein)	2021	176	—	High School Rapper 4
"Good Morning" (굿모닝) (Verbal Jint and Hanhae feat. Wonstein)	2021	— (Note: "Good Morning" did not enter the Gaon Digital Chart, but peaked at number 45 and 110 on the components Download Chart and BGM Chart, respectively.)	81	Non-album single
"Blue" (Shaun featuring Wonstein)	2021	— (Note: "Blue" did not enter the Gaon Digital Chart, but peaked at number 88 on the component Download Chart.)	91	#0055b7
"I'm Gonna Love You" (D.O. featuring Wonstein)	2021	99	79	Empathy
"Stay With Me" (곁에 있어줘) (Sole featuring Wonstein)	2021	— (Note: "Stay With Me" did not enter the Gaon Digital Chart, but peaked at number 95 and 104 on the components Download Chart and BGM Chart, respectively.)	90	Non-album single
"H.S.K.T." (머리어깨무릎발) (Lee Hi featuring Wonstein)	2021	185	—	4 Only
"Merry-Go-Round" (회전목마) (Sokodomo featuring Zion.T and Wonstein)	2021	1	1	Show Me the Money 10
"Super Rare" (Epik High featuring PH-1 and Wonstein)	2022	176	—	Epik High Is Here Part 2
"—" denotes a recording that did not chart or was not released in that territory.

== Filmography ==
=== Television ===
Title	Year	Role	Ref.
Show Me the Money 9	2020	Contestant	
Hangout with Yoo	2021	Reoccurring guest as member of MSG Wannabe	

== Ambassadorship ==
- Public Relations Ambassador for Save the Children (2022)

== Awards and nominations ==
Award	Year	Category	Nominated work/nominee	Result	Ref.
APAN Star Awards	2022	Best Original Soundtrack	"Tuning In To You"	Nominated	
Korean Hip-hop Awards	2021	New Artist of the Year	Wonstein	Nominated	
