= Nafla =

South Korean rapper (born 1992)

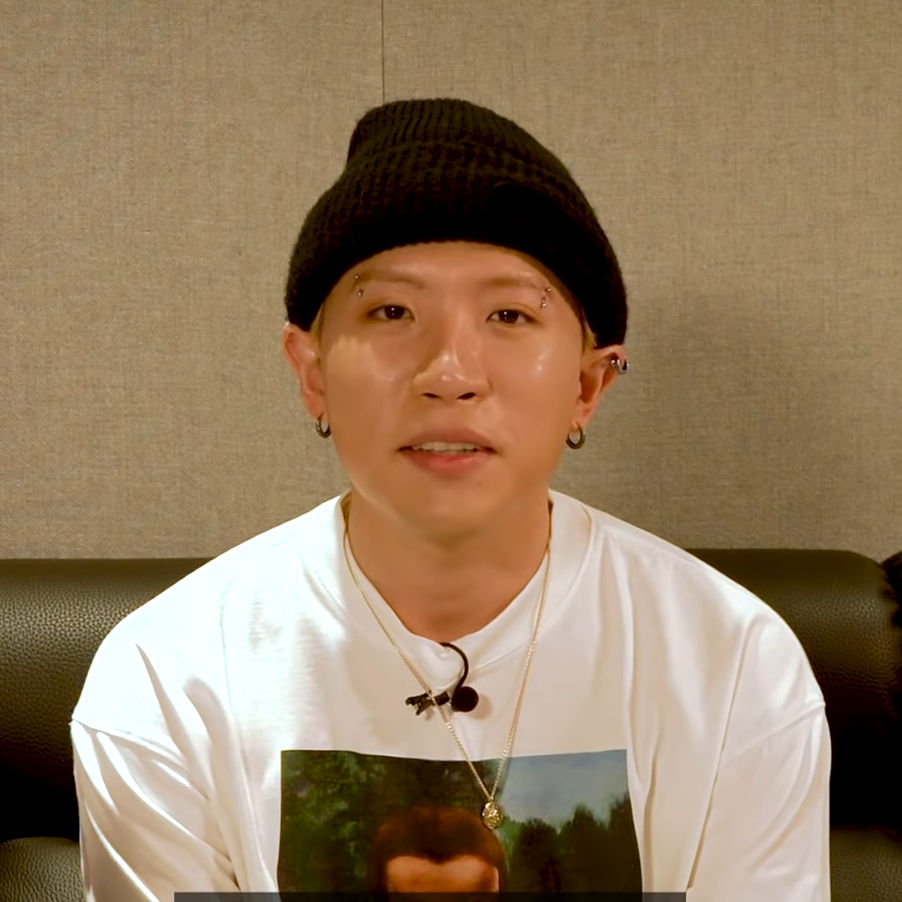
- Nafla in June 2020.

Background information
- Born: Nicholas Seok-bae Choi; February 28, 1992 (age 34); Orange County, California, U.S.
- Genres: Hip hop
- Occupation: Rapper
- Instrument: Vocals
- Years active: 2016–present
- Labels: MKIT Rain; Groovl1n

Korean name
- Hangul: 최석배
- RR: Choe Seokbae
- MR: Ch'oe Sŏkpae

Nicholas Seok-bae Choi (Korean: 최석배; born February 28, 1992), better known by his stage name Nafla (나플라), is a South Korean and American rapper. He was the winner of Show Me the Money 777.

== Early life and education ==
Nicholas Seok-bae Choi was born in Orange County, California, on February 28, 1992, to South Korean parents. He lived in the United States until he was five years old, and then lived in South Korea until he was in the fourth grade.

Choi subsequently returned to America and immediately entered the sixth grade, skipping a grade level. He attended Rosemont Middle School in La Crescenta, a suburban neighborhood in Los Angeles County. Choi went on to attend Crescenta Valley High School, where he met his MKIT Rain labelmates Bloo and Young West. Afterwards, Choi enrolled at the University of Southern California, and graduated in 2015 with a bachelor's degree in Business Administration.

== Legal issues ==
In 2019, Choi was investigated for illegal use of marijuana, which resulted in a suspended indictment. In June 2020, he was found guilty of violating South Korea's Narcotics Control Act by smoking marijuana in his home. Choi was sentenced to 2 years of probation with immediate imprisonment for any violations, along with 120 hours of community service.

On February 22, 2023, Choi was arrested for attempting to evade South Korea's mandatory military service. He was accused of falsifying medical records that diagnosed him with depression, as well as using these documents to apply for the position of a non-active duty personnel. Choi went on to pause his military service for 18 months on 7 occasions, and he also skipped his mandated duty as a social worker by filing for sick leave or early leave with his medical records. On August 10, 2023, Choi was sentenced to a year in prison.

On February 13, 2024, Choi was released on bail in accordance with the process of appealing his prison sentence.

== Discography ==
=== Studio albums ===
| Title | Album details | Peak chart positions | Sales |
| Title | Album details | KOR | Sales |
|---|---|---|---|
| Angels | Released: October 22, 2017; Label: Groovl1n, Warner Music; Formats: CD, digital download | 16 | KOR: 2,196 |
| U N U | Released: January 6, 2020 (U N U Part. 1); Released: March 24, 2020 (U N U Part. 2); Label: Groovl1n, Warner Music; Formats: CD, digital download | 19 | KOR: 2,013 |
| Natural High | Released: August 31, 2021; Label: Groovl1n, Warner Music; Formats: CD, digital download | 47 | —N/a |

=== Extended plays ===
| Title | Album details | Peak chart positions | Sales |
| Title | Album details | KOR | Sales |
|---|---|---|---|
| New Blood | Released: July 16, 2016; Label: MKIT Rain, Kakao Entertainment; Formats: CD, digital download | 15 | KOR: 2,023 |
| LooFla with Loopy | Released: June 10, 2019; Label: MKIT Rain, Kakao Entertainment; Formats: CD, digital download | 42 | KOR: 999 |

=== Charted singles ===
| Title | Year | Peak chart positions | Album |
| Title | Year | KOR | Album |
As lead artist
| "Bite" (물어) | 2018 | 34 | Non-album singles |
| "Sunbbang" feat. Gaeko, Giriboy | 2018 | 89 | Non-album singles |
Collaborations
| "SF Skills" (공상과학기술) with OLNL, Odee | 2018 | 28 | Non-album singles |
| "119" with Loopy, PH-1, Kid Milli, OLNL, Superbee | 2018 | 46 | Non-album singles |
