= D.Ark =

- Born: Jīn Yǔlín (金雨霖); Kim Woo-rim (김우림); July 15, 2004 (age 22); Yanbian, Jilin, China
- Genre: Hip hop
- Occupation: Rapper
- Instrument: Vocals
- Years active: 2018–present
- Labels: P Nation; God's Plan

Korean name
- Hangul: 김우림
- RR: Gim Urim
- MR: Kim Urim

Kim Woo-rim (Korean: 김우림), known professionally as D.Ark (디아크), is a Chinese rapper of Korean ethnicity. He made his first debut on December 30, 2020 with the digital single "Potential".

== Career ==
Prior to his official debut, D.Ark first appeared as a contestant on Show Me the Money 777. During his time on the show, D.Ark came under fire for allegations of sexual assault released by his girlfriend via Instagram. Following his official apology, D.Ark continued to participate on the show but had much of his footage edited out by the producers. He would also participate in Show Me the Money 9 in 2020.

On December 30, 2020, it was revealed that D.Ark had signed a contract, with P Nation releasing a music video for his debut single "Potential" on the same day.

In early 2021, D.Ark participated as a contestant on High School Rapper 4.

On May 4, 2021, P Nation announced that D.Ark was soon to be making his first comeback under the label. D.Ark's first EP EP1 Genius, released on May 13, 2021. The album featured notable guests such as Swings and Changmo.

On September 7, 2021, D.Ark became embroiled in controversy after an Instagram post which showed him posing with alcoholic drinks, implying he was drinking underage. In November 2021, it was reported that D.Ark had officially left P Nation after being signed for less than a year.

On December 11, 2021, it was widely reported that D.Ark was potentially dating the daughter of trot singer Lee Seung-ah, who was 8 years older than him. On December 29, 2021, D.Ark released his first mixtape independently, titled DKHVKY.

On August 10, 2022, D.Ark released his first full length studio album, The End of Puberty.

On November 27, 2024, it was announced that D.Ark had signed to a new label called God's Plan. His first EP under the label, Re:new, released 2 days later.

He was arrested by police on October 27, 2025 on charges of distribution and inhalation of marijuana.

Later, on November 7, 2025, D.Ark addressed the allegations in a handwritten letter posted on his social media, stating that he had completed all investigations with confidence and that all detailed tests had returned negative results. He said that although he was investigated, searched, and had his phone forensically examined due to mere suspicions of inhalation, the results had proven his innocence, and that the allegations of distribution were exaggerated and not part of the investigation. He reflected that he had experienced many malicious reports since his youth and was somewhat accustomed to misinformation, and he expressed a commitment to live uprightly and communicate with the world through music, thanking those who believed in and supported him.

== Discography ==
=== Studio albums ===
List of extended plays, with selected details, chart positions, and sales
Title	Album details	Peak chart positions			Sales
Title	Album details	KOR	US Heat	US World	Sales
End of Puberty	Released: August 10, 2022; Label: Independent; Formats: Digital download	—	—	—	
"—" denotes releases that did not chart or were not released in that region.

=== EPs and mixtapes ===
List of extended plays, with selected details, chart positions, and sales
Title	Album details	Peak chart positions			Sales
Title	Album details	KOR	US Heat	US World	Sales
EP 1 GENIUS	Released: May 12, 2021; Label: P Nation, Dreamus; Formats: Digital download; Track listing: 1. Genius (featuring Changmo; 2. Bad Kid (featuring Swings); 3. Trap Goding; 4. Feel My Feel (featuring Trade L & Roh Yunha); 5. Scum (feat. Moon Sun-jin)	—	—	—	
DKHVKY	Released: December 29, 2021; Label: Independent; Format: Digital download; Track listing: 1. Brain; 2. Facts (feat. Paloalto & Superbee); 3. Taught Me How To Luv (featuring Jhnovr); 4. Foul Languages; 5. On Top (featuring 365LIT); 6. After 00 (featuring Ji Hyeon-min & Osun)	—	—	—	—N/a
18	Released: October 28, 2023; Label: NetEase Cloud Music; Format: Digital download; Track listing: 1. Y&h (feat. Gali); 2. 今晚; 3. Still; 4. 一切都会好起来的; 5. 天天 (feat. 永彬Ryan.B); 6. C-Rage (feat. YOUNG13DBABY)	—	—	—	—N/a
Re:new	Released: November 29, 2024; Label: God's Plan; Format: Digital download; Track listing: 1. 20D.Ark; 2. Cough (featuring Roh Yun-ha & Vapo); 3. Bubble Gum Shot (featuring Royal 44); 4. Calvin Klein; 5. Straightforward; 6. Life Talk	—	—	—	—N/a
OG Intention	Released: April 22, 2025; Label: God's Plan; Format: Digital download; Track listing: 1. Antisocial Freestyle; 2. Luxury; 3. Ok Boomer; 4. Slutt Want Hoe (featuring Limited1); 5. Friday Night Mosh (featuring Paragons); 6. Club Popper	—	—	—	—N/a
"—" denotes releases that did not chart or were not released in that region.

=== Singles ===
Title	Year	Peak chart positions	Sales (DL)	Album
Title	Year	KOR	Sales (DL)	Album
As lead artist
"Potential"	2020	—		Non-album single
"Genius" feat. Changmo	2021	—		EP 1 Genius
"Bye"	2022	—		Non-album single
"C-Rage" feat. YOUNG13DBABY	2023	—		18
"She's Gone" feat. BE'O	2025	—		non-album single
"LOV(ING)"	2025	—		non-album single
As featured artist
"DNA" (Remix) Jay Park feat. YLN Foreign, D.Ark, and 365LIT	2021	—		non-album single
"W8 4 Me" Suzin feat. D.Ark	2022	—		non-album single
"—" denotes releases that did not chart or were not released in that region.

== Filmography ==
=== Television ===
Year	Channel	Title	Role
2018	Mnet	Show Me the Money 777	Contestant
2020	Mnet	Show Me the Money 9	Contestant
2021	Mnet	High School Rapper	Contestant
