= H1ghr Music =

South Korean record label

H1GHR MUSIC
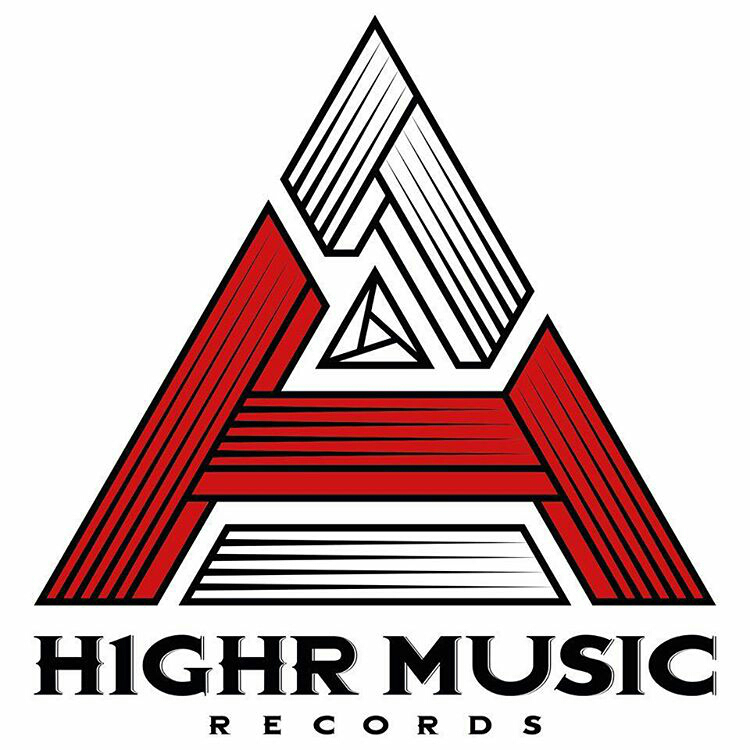
- Native name: 하이어뮤직레코즈
- Type: Subsidiary
- Industry: Music
- Genre: Hip-hop; R&B
- Founded: 2017–present
- Founder: Jay Park; Cha Cha Malone
- Headquarters: Seoul, South Korea
- Key people: Yu Deok-gon (CEO); Kang Hyun-jin (CEO)
- Parent: CJ ENM Entertainment Division
- Website: h1ghrmusic.com

H1ghr Music (stylized as H1GHR MUSIC; Korean: 하이어뮤직레코즈) is an international hip hop and R&B record label founded by Korean American musician Jay Park and long time Seattle affiliate Cha Cha Malone in 2017. Stationed primarily in South Korea, the label was created with the intent to "bridge the gap" between American and Korean artists, with a focus on adjacent Seattle talent. Currently, the label houses over 17 artists.

== History ==
H1ghr Music is a hip hop record label started in 2017 by Jay Park and Cha Cha Malone with the hopes of creating a more globally oriented label than Park's other Korean label, AOMG. Park created the label to show support for up and coming artists from his hometown of Seattle, Washington and South Korea through collaborations and bridge the gap between Korean and American Hip Hop artists. The name symbolizes the artists' goal to keep growing and to get to the next level. Label artist Avatar Darko was the one who suggested to replace the 'i' in Highr to a '1'.

The label launched with artists already signed. Aside from the founders, these artists included Yultron; Korean rappers Sik-K and pH-1; Seattle artists Avatar Darko, Raz Simone, Phe Reds, Jarv Dee. The label also began with producer roster consisting of GroovyRoom and Woogie.

Sik-K joined after participating in Show Me the Money 4 and after he parted ways with Grandline Entertainment, his former agency. His first single, titled "Fly", was released the same year. Raz Simone dropped his full-length album, Drive Theory, after signing.

Later in 2017, H1ghr Music signed producer Thurxday, who was later resigned in 2019 under the new name Mokyo. In June, singer Golden, formerly known as G.Soul, announced he had joined H1ghr Music after 17 years of being signed to JYP Entertainment. In October, Rapper Woodie Gochild signed after participating in Show Me the Money 6.

In 2018, H1GHR signed rapper Haon after he won the Korean rap survival show High School Rapper (Season 2) The same year he released his first EP, Travel: NOAH.

In 2019, the label signed the rapper Big Naughty after his participation in Show Me the Money 8.

In late 2019, Jarv Dee parted ways with H1ghr Music.

In 2020, the label released a remix version of Rain's song "Gang", which topped the Korean music charts. The same year, they signed a new artist, Trade L.

In August 2020, the label announced a compilation album featuring all the artists on the roster with Red Tape: H1GHR version being released on September 2, followed by “Blue Tape; : H1GHR” on September 16.

In March 2021, GroovyRoom announced that they are launching a new label called AREA (에어리어), in partnership with the label.

On December 31, 2021, Jay Park announced his resignation as Co-CEO of H1ghr Music. In 2022, the label announced the end of their exclusive contracts with Woogie, Sik-K, and Jay B.

Park Ji-hoo and Han Seo-bin, male trainees under the agency, appeared on Boys Planet, their first audition program since the agency's founding. After the show ended, Han Seo-bin left the agency and joined another agency, while Park Ji-hoo transferred to WakeOne and debuted on September 18, 2023, as part of the project group Evnne with Park Han-bin, Lee Jung-hyun, and Mun Jung-hyun from WakeOne, Yoo Seung-eon and Ji Yoon-seo from Yuehua Entertainment Korea, and Keita from R.A.I.N. Company.

On July 23, 2025, Lee Seoyeon signed with H1ghr Music as a solo musician after departing Fromis 9, adopting the stage name "Y:SY".

== Key people ==
- Jay Park (Founder, Advisor | CEO, 2017–2021)
- Cha Cha Malone (Co-CEO, 2017–2021)
- Yu Deok-gon (CEO)
- Kang Hyun-jin (CEO)
- Ok Yeongju (Inside Director)

== Artists ==
=== Rappers and singers ===
- pH-1
- BIG Naughty
- Woodie Gochild
- Lilboi
- simaron
- Y:SY

=== Producers and DJs ===
- Cha Cha Malone
- Yultron
- DJ SMMT

=== At Area ===
- GroovyRoom
- Yuju
- Mirani
- Gemini
- Blasé
- Boycold
- Goneisback
- Kwaca
- Redoor
- Sunwoo (The Boyz)

=== Former artists ===
- Raz Simone
- G.Soul (Golden)
- Ted Park
- Souf Souf
- 28AV
- Jarv Dee
- Mokyo
- Groovyroom
- DJ SMMT
- JMIN
- Woogie
- Sik-K
- Jay B
- HAON
- Trade L
- Dawn (At Area)
- Hyuna (At Area)

== Discography ==
Year	Album title	Artist
2017	Everywhere	GroovyRoom
2017	Boycold	Sik-K
2018	Rewind My Tape Part 1	Woogie
2018	#Gochild	Woodie Gochild
2018	Travel: Noah	Haon
2019	HALO	pH-1
2019	Room Service	GroovyRoom & Leellamarz
2020	Officially OG	Sik-K
2020	X	pH-1
2020	Headliner	Sik-K
2020	H1ghr: Red Tape	H1ghr Music
2020	H1ghr: Blue Tape	H1ghr Music
2021	Bucket List	Big Naughty
2021	Homecoming	JMin
2021	SOMO:Fume	Jay B
2021	Time Table	Trade L
2022	Mr. Hollywood	SMMT
2022	But For Now Leave Me Alone	pH-1

== Awards and nominations ==
Award Ceremony	Year	Category	Nominee	Result	Ref.
Korean Hip-hop Awards	2021	Hip-hop Album of the Year	H1ghr: Red Tape & H1ghr: Blue Tape	Nominated	
Korean Hip-hop Awards	2021	Hip-hop Track of the Year	"The Purge"	Nominated	
Korean Hip-hop Awards	2021	Music Video of the Year	"The Purge"	Won	
Korean Hip-hop Awards	2021	Label of the Year	H1ghr Music	Won	
Korean Hip-hop Awards	2022	Label of the Year	H1ghr Music	Nominated	

== Tours ==
H1ghr Music US Tour 2018

Date	City	Country	Venue
April 26, 2018	Chicago	United States	Park West
April 28, 2018	New York	United States	FREQ NYC
April 29, 2018	Phoenix	United States	Paris of Scottsdale
May 4, 2018	Los Angeles	United States	333 Live
May 5, 2018	San Francisco	United States	The Grand
May 8, 2018	Seattle	United States	The Showbox
