= X (pH-1 mixtape) =

Mixtape by pH-1
- Released: May 8, 2020
- Length: 31:41
- Label: H1ghr Music
- Producer: GroovyRoom; BMTJ; Gray; Woogie; Mokyo; Slom

PH-1 chronology
Halo (2019)	X (2020)

Professional ratings
Review scores
Source	Rating
Rhythmer	3.5/5

X is the first mixtape by South Korean rapper pH-1. It was released on May 8, 2020, through H1ghr Music.

== Music and lyrics ==
X features various styles of rapping instead of the soft melodic rap of pH-1's previous songs. In the lead singles "PACKITUP!" and "Anymore", pH-1 busts out of his previous soft image and shows off the unpretentious and masculine side of his personality.

== Track listing ==
No.	Title	Lyrics	Music	Arrangement	Length
1.	"MEET N GREET" (사인회) (Feat. Kid Milli)	pH-1, Kid Milli	GroovyRoom	GroovyRoom	2:33
2.	"OKAY" (Feat. Simon Dominic, Mushvenom)	pH-1, Simon Dominic, Mushvenom	GroovyRoom	GroovyRoom	3:23
3.	"PACKITUP!"	pH-1	BMTJ	BMTJ	2:04
4.	"BLAME MY CIRCLE" (Feat. Justhis, Owen)	pH-1, Justhis, Owen	pH-1, Gray, Dax	Gray, Dax	3:48
5.	"TELÉFONO" (Feat. Haon, Woodie Gochild, Jay Park, Sik-K)	pH-1, Haon, Woodie Gochild, Jay Park, Sik-K	Woogie	Woogie	3:12
6.	"FRONTIN" (센 척)	pH-1	pH-1, Gray, Dax	Dax, Gray	3:06
7.	"ANYMORE" (Feat. Ash Island)	pH-1, Ash Island	pH-1, Ash Island, Gray, Dax, Off	Off, Dax, Gray	3:11
8.	"I CAN TELL" (Feat. Bradystreet, Verbal Jint)	pH-1, Bradystreet, Verbal Jint	Mokyo, Jetti, pH-1	Mokyo, Jetti	3:36
9.	"MORAGO" (Feat. Blase, Coogie)	pH-1, Blase, Coogie	Slom	Slom	3:33
10.	"DRESSING ROOM"	pH-1	pH-1, Mokyo, Jetti	Mokyo	3:15
Total length:					31:41

== Charts ==
Chart (2020)	Peak position
South Korean albums (Gaon)	27

== Sales ==
Region	Certification	Certified units/sales
South Korea	—	4,579
