= PH-1 (rapper) =

Korean-American rapper

pH-1
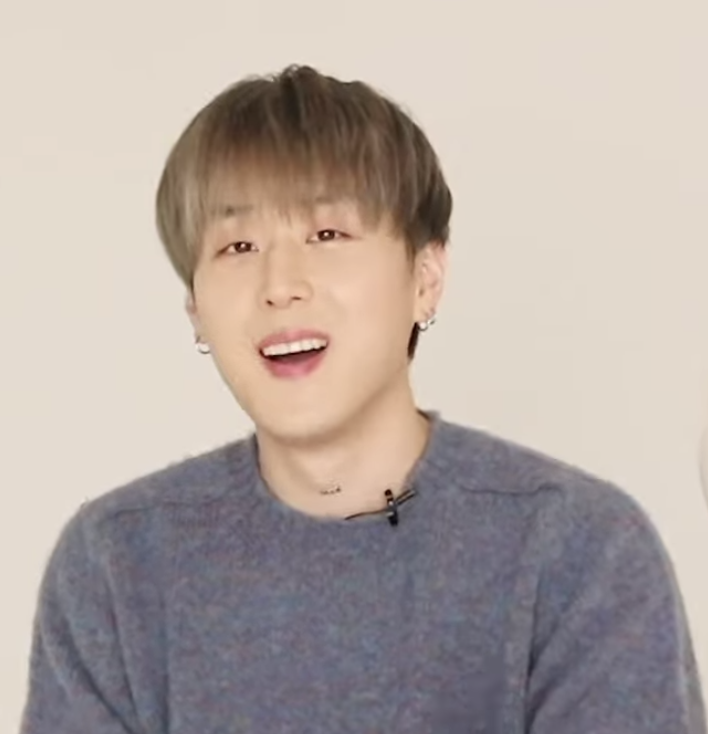
- pH-1 in February 2020

Background information
- Also known as: Harry Park
- Born: Park Jun-won; July 23, 1989 (age 37); Seoul, South Korea
- Genres: Hip hop, trap, pop rap, K-pop
- Occupation: Rapper
- Instrument: Vocals
- Years active: 2016–present
- Label: H1ghr
- Website: h1ghrmusicofficial.com/pH-1

Korean name
- Hangul: 박준원
- RR: Bak Junwon
- MR: Pak Chunwŏn

Park Jun-won or Harry Park (Korean: 박준원, born July 23, 1989), better known by his stage name pH-1, is a Korean-American rapper based in South Korea. In 2017, he signed to H1ghr Music. In 2018, he appeared on Show Me the Money 777 and gained popularity.

== Early life and education ==
Park was born in South Korea and moved with his family to Long Island, New York, when he was about 12 years old. He studied biology at Boston College and worked as a dental assistant post-graduation. Park was later employed at a web development company.

The stage name pH-1 is a combination of his name, "p" from his surname Park, "H" from the English name Harry, and "Won" from the Korean name Park Jun-won.

== Career ==
In 2016, pH-1 released his debut single "Wavy". In May 2017, he signed to H1ghr Music. In October, he released his debut extended play The Island Kid. In 2018, he appeared on Show Me the Money 777 and gained popularity. In 2019, he released his debut studio album HALO. In May 2020, he released his debut mixtape X. In September, he participated in H1ghr Music's compilation albums H1ghr: Red Tape and H1ghr: Blue Tape. In 2022, he released his second studio album But for Now Leave Me Alone. On August 13, 2025, he released his third album What Have We Done.

== Artistry ==
pH-1 is known for his melodic "singing-raps". He gets inspiration from a wide range of musical genres: jazz, pop, R&B, and gospel music.

As the three keywords he pursues in his music are truth, positivity, and experience, his work contains positive or honest messages, generally excluding references to drugs, money bragging and excessive "flexing", and explicit sexual content.

== Discography ==
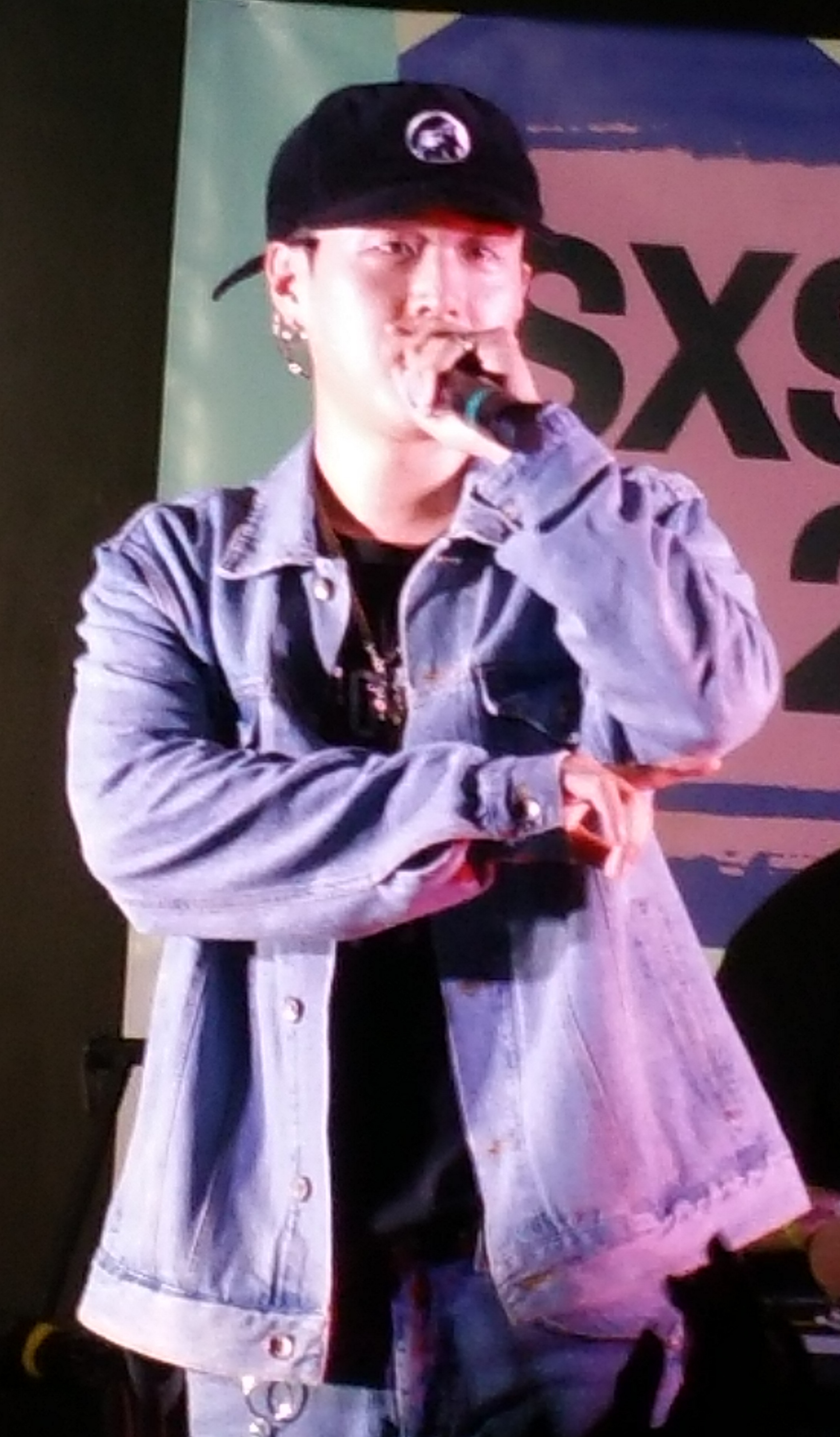
pH-1 at SXSW in 2018

=== Studio albums ===
Title	Album details	Peak chart positions	Sales
Title	Album details	KOR	Sales
HALO	Released: March 28, 2019; Label: H1ghr Music; Formats: CD, digital download	21	KOR: 3,782
But for Now Leave Me Alone	Released: September 15, 2022; Label: H1ghr Music; Formats: CD, digital download	24	KOR: 7,020
What Have We Done	Released: August 13, 2025; Label: H1ghr Music; Formats: CD, LP, digital download	62	KOR: 2,461

=== Mixtape ===
Title	Album details	Peak chart positions	Sales
Title	Album details	KOR	Sales
X	Released: May 8, 2020; Label: H1ghr Music; Formats: CD, digital download	27	KOR: 4,579

=== Extended plays ===
Title	Album details	Peak chart positions	Sales
Title	Album details	KOR	Sales
The Island Kid	Released: October 18, 2017; Label: H1ghr Music; Formats: CD, digital download	45	
Pop Off	Released: November 2, 2023; Label: H1ghr Music; Formats: CD, digital download	34	KOR: 2,274

=== Singles ===
Title	Year	Peak chart positions	Certifications	Album
Title	Year	KOR	Certifications	Album
As lead artist
"Wavy"	2016	—		Non-album singles
"Perfect"	2016	—		Non-album singles
"Donut" (feat. Jay Park)	2017	—		The Island Kid
"Penthouse" (feat. Sik-K)	2018	—		Gatsby (single album)
"DVD"	2018	—		Harry (single album)
"Cupid" (feat. Penomeco)	2018	—		Loves (single album)
"Hate You" (feat. Woo Won-jae)	2018	19		Show Me the Money 777
"Orange" (주황색) (feat. Jay Park)	2018	56		Show Me the Money 777
"Flaker" (무리야)	2018	—		Staying (single album)
"Like Me"	2019	—		HALO
"Malibu" (feat. The Quiett, Mokyo)	2019	—		HALO
"BOOL" (feat. Beenzino)	2019	—		Summer Episodes (single album)
"Truman Show Remix" (feat. Ahn Byeong-woong, Owen Ovadoz)	2019	—		Non-album singles
"Nerdy Love" (feat. Baek Ye-rin)	2020	38		Non-album singles
"PACKITUP"	2020	—		X
"ANYMORE" (feat. Ash Island)	2020	—		X
"Antisocial"	2021	— (Note: "Antisocial" did not enter the Gaon Digital Chart, but appeared at number 127 on the component Download chart.)		Non-album singles
"365&7" (feat. Jamie)	2021	120		Non-album singles
"Lately" (feat. Hoody)	2021	— (Note: "Lately" did not enter the Gaon Digital Chart, but appeared at number 158 on the component Download chart.)		Non-album singles
"Mr. Bad" (feat. Woo Won-jae)	2022	— (Note: "Mr. Bad" did not enter the Circle Digital Chart, but peaked at number 92 on the component Download chart.)		But For Now Leave Me Alone
"Rosetta" (feat. Milli)	2023	—		Pop Off
"Used To Be"	2024	—		Non-album singles
"Flat Coke" (feat. Lee Young-ji)	2024	— (Note: "Flat Coke" did not enter the Circle Digital Chart, but peaked at number 95 on the component Download chart.)		Non-album singles
"Life Is a Movie" (인생영화) (feat. Jung Zi So)	2024	— (Note: "Life Is a Movie" did not enter the Circle Digital Chart, but peaked at number 108 on the component Download chart.)		Non-album singles
"Gosha" (feat. Karencici)	2025	—		What Have We Done
"54321" (feat. Haewon of Nmixx)	2025	— (Note: "54321" did not enter the Circle Digital Chart, but peaked at number 78 on the component Download chart.)		What Have We Done
Collaborations
"Iffy" (with Sik-K, Jay Park)	2017	99		Non-album single
"Good Day" (with Kid Milli, Loopy, feat. Paloalto)	2018	4	KMCA: Platinum (dl.); KMCA: Platinum (str.)	Show Me the Money 777
"119" (with Nafla, Kid Milli, OLNL, Loopy, Superbee)	2018	46		Show Me the Money 777
"Giddy Up" (with Sik-K, Haon, Woodie Gochild, Jay Park)	2019	120		Non-album singles
"Blue Champagne" (with Cheeze)	2019	172		Non-album singles
"Gang Official Remix" (깡 Official Remix) (with Sik-K, Jay Park, Haon)	2020	4		Non-album singles
"Achoo" (with Mirani, Haon)	2020	5		Show Me the Money 9
"Never Again" (with Xbf)	2020	—		Transit #2
"VVS (H1ghr Remix)" (with BIG Naughty, Trade L, Jay Park, Woodie Gochild, Kidd King)	2021	108		(G+Jus)
"Achoo" (Remix) (with Mirani, Munchman, Sik-K, Dbo, Kid Milli, Swings, Justhis)	2021	—		(G+Jus)
"Zero:Attitude" (Soyou, Iz*One, (Note: Only Kwon Eun-bi, Sakura Miyawaki, Kim Min-ju, Jo Yu-ri and Jang Won-young participated.) feat. PH-1)	2021	119		2021 Pepsi X Starship
"Mentors" (멘토스) (with The Quiett, Simon Dominic, Nucksal, Jay Park, Loco, Changmo, Yumdda, Way Ched, Woogie)	2021	— (Note: "Mentors" did not enter the Gaon Digital Chart, but appeared at number 53 on the component Download chart.)		High School Rapper 4 Episode 0
"Mungpal" (멍멍팔팔) (with Paloalto)	2021	—		Non-album singles
"DNA Remix" (with Jay Park, YLN Foreign, Woogie, D.Ark, 365LIT, Lil Boi, Lee Young-ji, Ourealgoat, Choo, OSUN)	2021	— (Note: "DNA Remix" did not enter the Gaon Digital Chart, but appeared at number 69 on the component Download chart.)		Non-album singles
"ALL IN" (with Jay Park)	2021	— (Note: "ALL IN" did not enter the Gaon Digital Chart, but appeared at number 65 on the component Download chart.)		Non-album singles
"As I Told You (Remix)" (말하자면 Remix) (with Kim Sung-jae)	2021	— (Note: "As I Told You (Remix)" did not enter the Circle Digital Chart, but peaked at number 69 on the component Download chart.)		Non-album singles
"Metronome" (with Keita)	2023	—		Non-album singles
"Show Must Go On" (with Brian Chase)	2025	—		Non-album singles
"—" denotes releases that did not chart or were not released in that region.

== Tours ==
- About Damn Time Tour (2023)

== Filmography ==
=== Television show ===
Year	Title	Role	Ref.
2018	Show Me the Money 777	Contestant	
2021	High School Rapper 4	Mentor	
2021	King of Mask Singer	Contestant	
2023	Boys Planet	Rap master	

== Awards and nominations ==
Year	Award	Category	Nominated work	Result	Ref.
2019	Korean Hip-hop Awards	Hip Hop Track of the Year	"Good Day" with Kid Milli, Loopy, feat. Paloalto	Nominated	
2019	Korean Hip-hop Awards	Collaboration of the Year	"Good Day" with Kid Milli, Loopy, feat. Paloalto	Nominated	
2020	Melon Music Awards	Best Rap/Hip Hop Award	"Gang Official Remix" with Rain, Sik-K, Jay Park, Haon	Nominated	
2021	Korean Hip-hop Awards	Hip Hop Track of the Year	"The Purge" with Woodie Gochild, Big Naughty, Haon, Trade L, Sik-K, Jay Park	Nominated	
2021	Korean Hip-hop Awards	Music Video of the Year	"The Purge" with Woodie Gochild, Big Naughty, Haon, Trade L, Sik-K, Jay Park	Won	
