= G.Soul =

South Korean singer (born 1988)

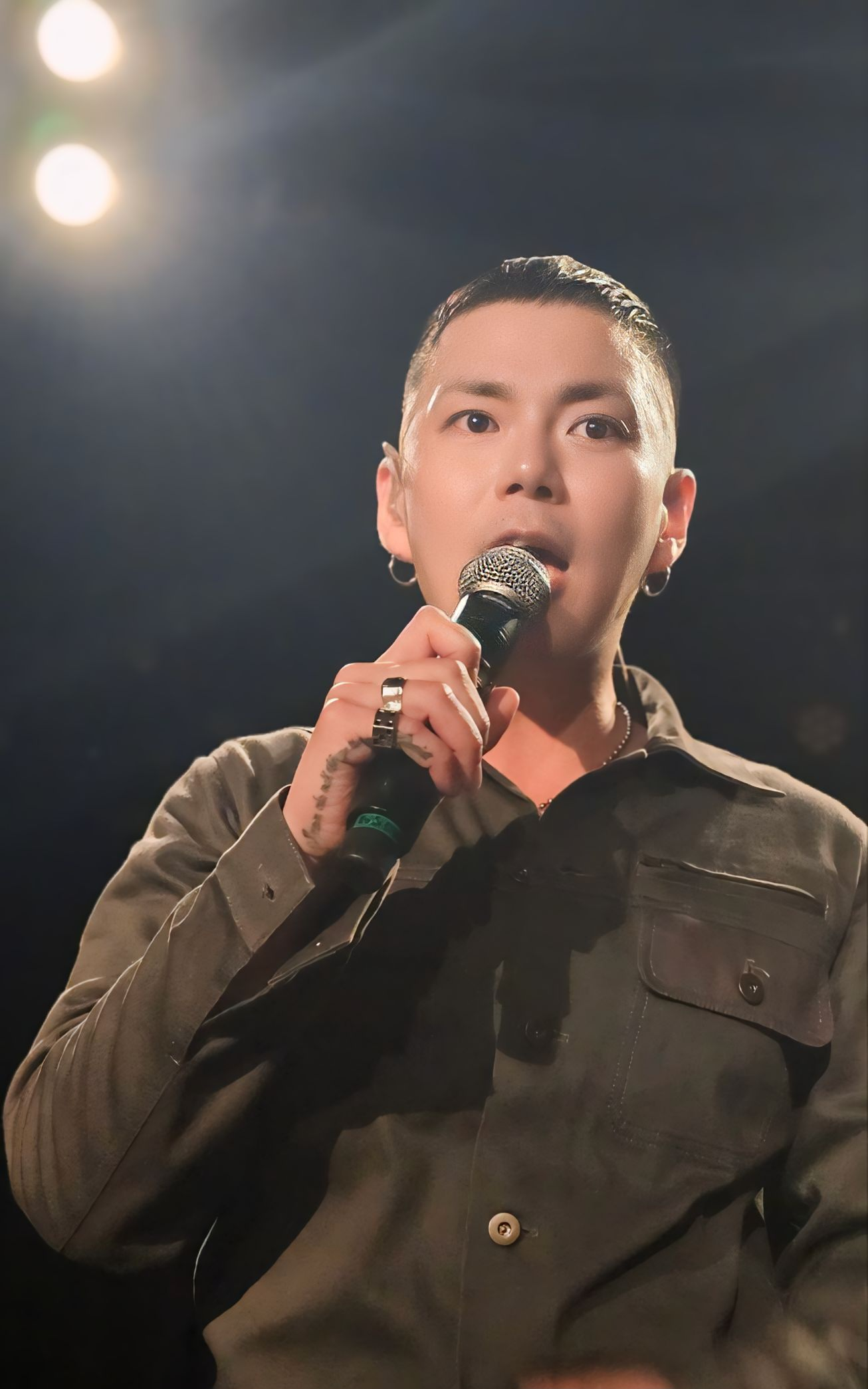
- G.Soul performing in 2024

Background information
- Also known as: Golden (2019–2021)
- Born: Kim Ji-hyun; June 16, 1988 (age 38)
- Origin: South Korea
- Genres: R&B; soul; electronica
- Occupation: Singer-songwriter
- Years active: 2015–present
- Labels: Studio J; H1ghr Music; Warner Music Korea

Korean name
- Hangul: 김지현
- RR: Gim Jihyeon
- MR: Kim Chihyŏn

Kim Ji-hyun (Korean: 김지현; born June 16, 1988), professionally known as Golden or G.Soul, is a South Korean singer-songwriter. He first made his debut under JYP Entertainment with the release of his EP Coming Home on January 19, 2015. On June 6, 2017, it was revealed that he left JYP and would be joining H1ghr Music.

On December 2, 2019, it was announced by H1ghr Music that G.Soul would change his name to Golden, named after a song by Jill Scott. In 2020, he won the third season of The Voice of Korea. On January 11, 2021, he announced via Instagram Stories that he would be changing his name back to G.Soul.

== Early life and education ==
In 2001, G.Soul met J.Y. Park through an audition show on SBS called Prodigy Growth 99% (영재육성 프로젝트 99%). Before debuting as a solo artist in South Korea, G.Soul received recognition in the country and some parts of America for being a "protégé". He was trained for 15 years before making his debut, making him the longest trainee under JYP Entertainment.

== Discography ==
=== Extended plays ===
Title	Album details	Peak chart positions	Sales
Title	Album details	KOR	Sales
Coming Home	Released: January 19, 2015; Label: JYP Entertainment, KT Music; Formats: CD, digital download	14	KOR: 1,060
Dirty	Released: September 10, 2015; Label: JYP Entertainment, KT Music; Formats: CD, digital download	—	—N/a
Circles	Released: September 7, 2017; Label: H1ghr Music, CJ E&M; Formats: CD, digital download	62	—N/a
Hate Everything	Released: December 11, 2019; Label: H1ghr Music, CJ E&M; Formats: CD, digital download	—	—N/a
Natural	Released: December 2, 2021; Label: Warner Music Korea; Formats: CD, digital download	—	—N/a
"—" denotes releases that did not chart.

=== Singles ===
Title	Year	Peak chart positions	Sales (DL)	Album
Title	Year	KOR	Sales (DL)	Album
"You"	2015	9	KOR: 114,016	Coming Home
"You" (acoustic ver.)	2015	—	—N/a	Non-album singles
"Love Me Again"	2015	63	KOR: 30,291	Non-album singles
"Crazy For You" (미쳐있어 나타이틀)	2015	—	KOR: 17,144	Dirty
"Smooth Operator" feat. San E	2016	—	—N/a	Non-album singles
"Far, Far Away" (멀리멀리)	2016	50	KOR: 59,932	Non-album singles
"Tequila" feat. Hoody	2017	—	—N/a	Circles
"Bad Habit" (술버릇)	2017	—	—N/a	Circles
"Can't" (아직도 난)	2017	—	—N/a	Circles
"I'll Be There"	2017	—	—N/a	Non-album single
"Hate Everything" (Korean Ver.)	2019	—	—N/a	Hate Everything
"H1GHR" with Jay Park	2020	—	—N/a	H1GHR : RED TAPE
"Oscar" with Jay Park, pH-1, BIG Naughty	2020	—	—N/a	H1GHR : BLUE TAPE
"Afternoon" with Jay Park, pH-1	2020	—	—N/a	H1GHR : BLUE TAPE
"Another Sad Love Song" (이런 슬픈 노래)	2020	—	—N/a	Another Sad Love Song
"Can Love Be Fair" (사랑이 공평할 순 없을까) feat. Ben	2021	118	—N/a	Non-album singles
"For You" (Prod. WOOGIE)	2021	—	—N/a	Non-album singles
"Natural"	2021	—	—N/a	Natural
"Need You (Outro)"	2022	—	—N/a	Non-album singles
"Everytime"	2022	—	—N/a	Non-album singles
"—" denotes releases that did not chart.

=== Soundtrack appearances ===
Title	Year	Album
"Love Bloomed Late (Too Late)"	2004	Full House OST
"Open"	2006	Syndrome OST
"Stay: tempus"	2021	Sisyphus: The Myth OST
"Summertime"	2021	The Box OST
"Lost Game"	2022	Revenge of Others OST

=== Other charted songs ===
Title	Year	Peak chart positions	Sales (DL)	Album
Title	Year	KOR	Sales (DL)	Album
As lead artist
"Coming Home"	2015	75	KOR: 21,601	Coming Home
"Superstar"	2015	94	KOR: 18,627	Coming Home
"First Love"	2015	93	KOR: 18,957	Coming Home
"Excuses" (변명)	2015	89	KOR: 20,144	Coming Home
"—" denotes releases that did not chart.
