= Waterbomb festival =

Korean music festival

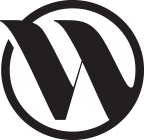
- Official Logo
- Genre: Korean pop; Hip-hop; EDM
- Locations: South Korea; Japan; Thailand; Singapore; United Arab Emirates; China (including Hong Kong and Macau); Philippines; Indonesia; Vietnam
- Inaugurated: 2015
- Founders: Volume Unit Entertainment
- Organizer: Madeone
- Website: waterbombfestival.com

Waterbomb is an annual summer music festival founded by Volume Unit Entertainment and organized by Madeone. It was first launched in 2015 in Seoul, South Korea, and has since expanded to other cities and countries. The festival features a mix of music, dance, and art performances on multiple stages, showcasing both national and international artists with a focus on K-pop, hip-hop, and EDM.

In addition to the performances, there are photo booths, art and lounge spaces, food vendors, retail store stalls and a VVIP lounge set up during the festival. As the name suggests, the festival also includes various water-based activities such as water cannons, water gun fights, pool parties, and more. It has been criticized for its high water usage.

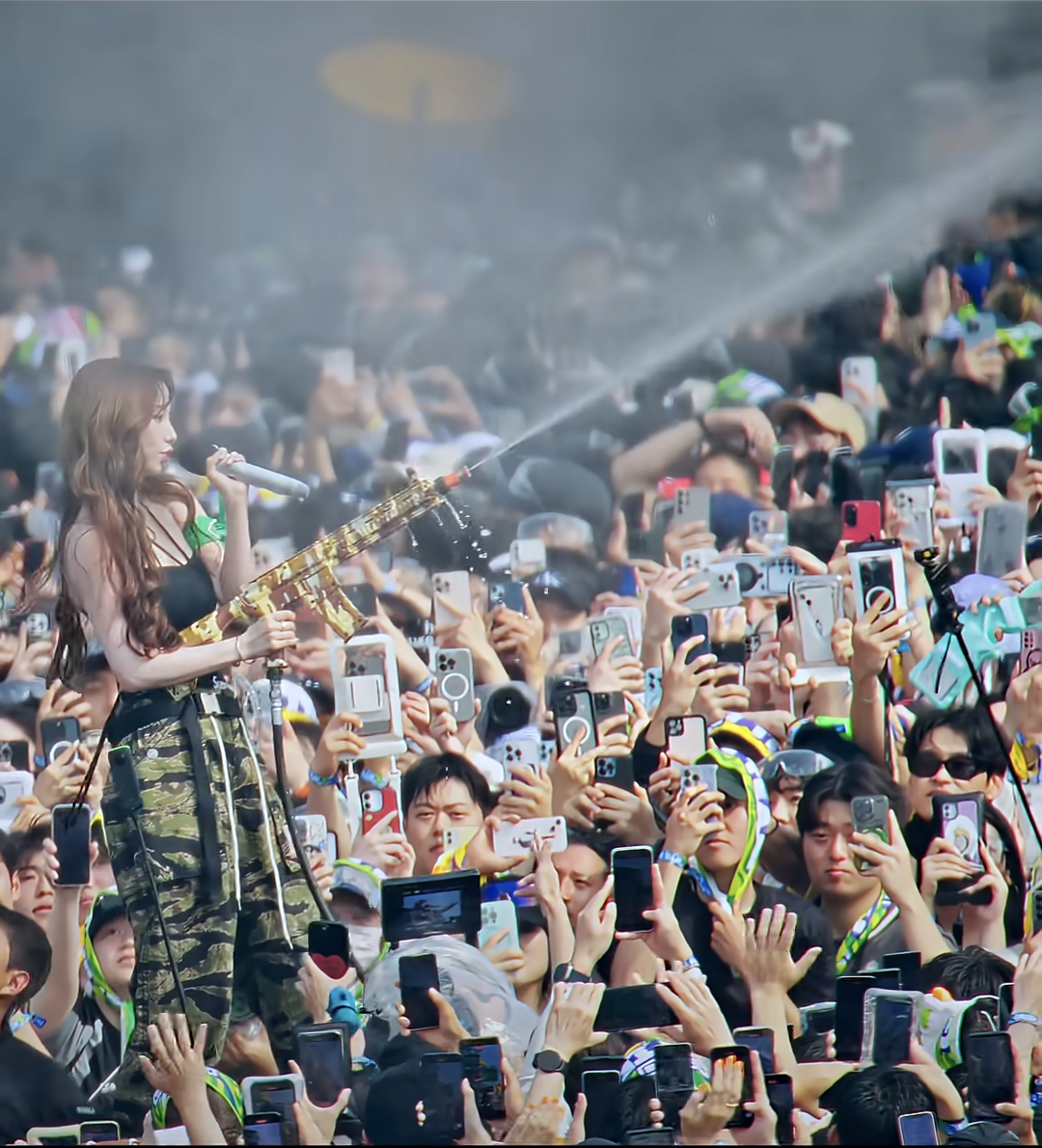
Karina performing while using a water gun during Waterbomb 2025

The event usually divides its artists into two different teams, each characterized by different colours. The festival-goers are free to choose their team when buying the tickets to the event. This includes a water fight between the two teams and a winner is announced at the end of the festival.

== Locations and dates ==
=== 2015 ===
Edition	Date	Location	Venue	Line-up	Ref.
1	August 1	Seoul, South Korea	Jamsil Sports Complex	1. Peachade; 2. Maximite x Juncoco; 3. Vandal Rock x Day Walker; 4. Frants; 5. Inside Core; 6. Kingmck; 7. Hi-Lite & The Cohort; 8. Tropkillaz; Red Team; 1. Skull & HAHA; 2. DJ Koo; 3. Paloalto; 4. Lucky J 5. Zizo; Blue Team; 1. DJ Doc; 2. G.Park; 3. B-Free; 4. Vasco; 5. Genius Nochang; 6. Rock Bottom	

=== 2016 ===
Edition	Date	Location	Venue	Line-up	Ref.
2	July 30	Seoul, South Korea	Jamsil Sports Complex	Red Team; 1. Gray; 2. Loco; 3. DJ Koo; 4. Microdot; 5. D.I.D; 6. DJ Wegun; 7. S2; 8. Insidecore; 9. Juncoco; 10. DJ Kaeun; Blue Team; 1. Simon Dominic; 2. Jessi; 3. Hanhae; 4. DJ Pumpkin; 5. Rude Paper; 6. Vandal Rock; 7. Maximite; 8. Toyo; 9. Peachade; 10. Hang5va	

=== 2017 ===
Edition	Date	Location	Venue	Line-up	Ref.
3	July 29	Seoul, South Korea	Jamsil Sports Complex	Blue Team; 1. Didi Han; 2. Toyo; 3. Maximite; 4. Skull & HAHA; 5. Aster; 6. DinDin; 7. Hyuna; 8. DJ Koo; 9. C Jamm; 10. Lookas; Green Team; 1. Juncoco; 2. Soundfuze; 3. Peachade; 4. AK; 5. Punch Nello; 6. Sleepy; 7. S2; 8. Insidecore; 9. Jessi; 10. Bewhy	

=== 2018 ===
Edition	Date	Location	Venue	Line-up	Ref.
4	July 20	Seoul, South Korea	Jamsil Sports Complex	Green Team; 1. Smasher; 2. Sura; 3. Rwam + L11evn; 4. Nucksal, Don Mills; 5. Mewloud; 6. Jessi; 7. Winner; 8. Junkie Kid; Blue Team; 1. Yena; 2. Vandi; 3. Glory; 4. Kade; 5. Siena Girls; 6. Hyolyn; 7. Tigerlily; 8. Drunken Tiger & Bizzy	
4	July 21	Seoul, South Korea	Jamsil Sports Complex	Green Team; 1. Demian Layke; 2. S2; 3. Aster; 4. Woodie Gochild; 5. Juncoco; 6. Microdot; 7. DJ Koo; 8. Chungha; 9. Insidecore; 10. Sunmi; 11. Wiwek; Blue Team; 1. Toyo; 2. Paralyze Idea; 3. Wehigher; 4. AK; 5. Sik-K; 6. PH-1; 7. Skull & Haha; 8. Jay Park; 9. Gammer	
4	July 28	Busan, South Korea	Busan Asiad Stadium	Red Team; 1. Keith Ape; 2. DPR Live; 3. Sik-K; 4. PH-1; 5. Rude Paper; 6. DJ Soda; 7. 19XX; 8. Baryonyx; 9. Jake Pains; 10. Triple X 11. Rana; 12. TK; 13. 24Flakko; Blue Team; 1. Overwrek; 2. Loco; 3. UV; 4. Woodie Gochild; 5. Giant Pink; 6. DJ Koo; 7. Chunja; 8. SKY; 9. Wooxi; 10. Wehigher; 11. Tajo; 12. Hera; 13. No.50	

=== 2019 ===
Edition	Date	Location	Venue	Line-up	Ref.
5	July 13	Busan, South Korea	Busan Asiad Stadium	Green Team; 1. Lyn & Mari; 2. Dia; 3. W 4. Young & Rich; 5. TK; 6. Jessi; 7. Aster; 8. Winner; 9. Sura; Purple Team; 1. Toyo; 2. Siena Girls; 3. Kade; 4. RGP; 5. AK; 6. Sik-K; 7. Insidecore; 8. Crush; 9. Bingo Players; 10. Zico	
5	July 20	Seoul, South Korea	Jamsil Sports Complex	Green Team; 1. Jay Park; 2. Jessi; 3. Chungha; 4. UV; 5. Mike Perry; 6. Aster; 7. Paralyze Idea; 8. Baryonyx; 9. Haechi; Yellow Team; 1. SayMyName; 2. Simon Dominic; 3. Gray; 4. Woo Won-jae; 5. Sik-K; 6. Woodie Gochild; 7. PH-1; 8. Insidecore; 9. Siena Girls; 10. Cream; 11. DJ Wow; 12. Demian Layke	
5	July 21	Seoul, South Korea	Jamsil Sports Complex	Green Team; 1. Zico; 2. DPR Live; 3. Party Flavor; 4. Juncoco; 5. Kade; 6. Mewloud; 7. Toyo; 8. Reverse Prime; 9. Kyte; Yellow Team; 1. Crush; 2. Hyuna; 3. RGP; 4. Loopy; 5. Nafla; 6. Nitti Gritti; 7. Sura; 8. AK; 9. Junior Chef; 10. Sixthema	
5	August 10	Incheon, South Korea	Paradise City	Green Team; 1. Toyo; 2. Vandi; 3. S2; 4. OXO (Yena & Wooxi); 5. Aster; 6. Siena Girls; 7. Simon Dominic; 8. Gray; 9. Breathe Carolina; Orange Team; 1. Kirin; 2. Cream; 3. Baryonyx; 4. Mewloud; 5. Sik-K; 6. Woodie Gochild; 7. PH-1; 8. Jessi; 9. RGP; 10. Juncoco; 11. The Quiett; 12. Beenzino; 13. Insidecore; 14. Jay Park	
5	August 15	Daejeon, South Korea	Daejeon Hanbat Sports Complex	Blue Team; 1. Kodeline; 2. Toyo; 3. Kade; 4. CLC; 5. Juncoco; 6. Sik-K; 7. Woodie Gochild; 8. PH-1; 9. Aster; 10. Winner; 11. Virtual Riot; 12. Dynamic Duo; Red Team; 1. Entaro; 2. Haechi; 3. Vandi; 4. OXO (Yena & Wooxi); 5. AK; 6. Sura; 7. RGP; 8. Inside Core; 9. Simon Dominic; 10. Gray	
5	August 17	Daegu, South Korea	Daegu Stadium	Purple Team; 1. Toyo; 2. DJ Winner; 3. Loopy/ Nafla; 4. Mewloud; 5. TK; 6. Aster; 7. Hyuna; 8. Virtual Riot; 9. Simon Dominic/ Gray/ Woo Won-jae; Orange Team; 1. Chobob; 2. Naya; 3. Haechi; 4. Paralyze Idea; 5. Hyungdon and Daejun; 6. Kade; 7. Sik-K/ Woodie Gochild/ PH-1; 8. Insidecore; 9. The Quiett/ Beenzino	
5	August 24	Gwangju, South Korea	Gwangju Women's University	Blue Team; 1. Neo; 2. Toyo; 3. Mewloud; 4. UV; 5. Ravi; 6. Paralyze Idea; 7. Sleepy; 8. Juncoco; 9. Inside Core; 10. Crush; Red Team; 1. Krein; 2. Demian Layke; 3. Advanced; 4. Kade; 5. Sik-K/ Woodie Gochild/ PH-1; 6. Hyuna; 7. Aster; 8. Beenzino; 9. Jay Park	

=== 2022 ===
Edition	Date	Location	Venue	Line-up	Ref.
6	June 24	Seoul, South Korea	Jamsil Sports Complex	Green Team; 1. Haee; 2. Nine.i; 3. TPA; 4. La Chica; 5. DJ Roots; 6. Ash Island; 7. Siena Girls; 8. Kai; 9. Raiden; 10. Zico; Yellow Team; 1. Vandi; 2. Homies; 3. S2&R2+MIU; 4. Be'O; 5. Paralyze Idea; 6. Hwasa; 7. Mewloud; 8. Sunmi; 9. Aster & Neo	
6	June 25	Seoul, South Korea	Jamsil Sports Complex	Green Team; 1. Hendorphin; 2. Eze; 3. Hakey; 4. Holy Bang; 5. Toyo; 6. Sik-K, pH-1, Haon; 7. Hoya; 8. Jessi; 9. AK; 10. Jay Park; Yellow Team; 1. Joody; 2. Bibi; 3. DJ Sky; 4. Giriboy; 5. Apro; 6. Chungha; 7. Ye:na x Wooxi; 8. Loco & Gray; 9. Insidecore	
6	June 26	Seoul, South Korea	Jamsil Sports Complex	Green Team; 1. Seorin; 2. Mirani; 3. Merpik; 4. Lee Young-ji; 5. Kade; 6. (G)I-dle; 7. Otwo; 8. Sura; 9. Juncoco; 10. CL; Yellow Team; 1. Kirin; 2. Coogie; 3. Jeiff; 4. Hook; 5. Spray; 6. DPR Live; 7. Winner; 8. Simon Dominic; 9. Shaun	
6	July 23	Daegu, South Korea	Daegu Stadium	Emerald Team; 1. Viki; 2. Tobirush x Tillit; 3. Bibi; 4. Loco; 5. Gray; 6. Hoya; 7. Aster & Neo; 8. Insidecore; 9. Jay Park; Red Team; 1. Denis & Boyd; 2. Wavy; 3. Anomy; 4. S2&R2; 5. TK; 6. Otwo; 7. Hyolyn; 8. Jessi; 9. Simon Dominic	
6	July 30	Busan, South Korea	Busan Asiad Stadium	Pink Team; 1. Stefano x Ruta; 2. Since; 3. ZB & Ation; 4. Advanced; 5. Moonbin & Sanha; 6. AK; 7. Woo Won-jae & Coogie; 8. Aster & Neo; 9. iKon; 10. CL; Navy Team; 1. Ari; 2. Lyn; 3. Big Naughty; 4. Vandi x Benzera; 5. Lee Young-ji; 6. Siena Girls; 7. Ravi; 8. Sura; 9. Bibi; 10. Shaun	
6	August 6	Incheon, South Korea	Paradise City	Mint Team; 1. Cheez; 2. Miu; 3. Frog; 4. Daul; 5. Overdrive & For.E; 6. Meenoi; 7. Sik-K; 8. Sura (feat. O Yeonha); 9. Loco & Gray; 10. Juncoco; 11. CL; Orange Team; 1. Yuria & Deva; 2. Macker; 3. Epiik & Sixthema; 4. Kid Milli; 5. PH-1; 6. Youkeep; 7. DJ Smmt; 8. Jessi; 9. Las; 10. Hyuna; 11. Simon Dominic; 12. Aster & Neo	
6	August 13	Suwon, South Korea	Suwon World Cup Auxiliary Stadium	Lemon Team; 1. Jidanwoo; 2. For.E; 3. S2 & R2 (feat. DALsoobin); 4. Wavy ( Colde; Apro; Ahn Byeong-woong; Khakii ); 5. Holybang; 6. Miu; 7. Pure100% x Cream; 8. Gray; 9. Aster & Neo; 10. Zico; Sky Team; 1. Eleven; 2. Kade; 3. Kangho; 4. Hyolyn; 5. Paralyze Idea; 6. Loco; 7. OXO; 8. Simon Dominic; 9. Insidecore; 10. Jay Park	

=== 2023 ===
Edition	Date	Location	Venue	Line-up	Ref.
7	April 13	Bangkok, Thailand	Thunderdome Stadium	Team Green; 1. ZICO; 2. Sunmi; 3. SURA; 4. Cream; 5. Bear Knuckle; 6. Roxy June; 7. PIXZY; 8. Proxie; 9. The7; Team Silver; 1. Yugyeom; 2. Aster & Neo; 3. Coogie; 4. Woo Won Jae; 5. OTWO; 6. Joody; 7. YUI; 8. Pixxie; 9. Casper Yu	
7	April 14	Bangkok, Thailand	Thunderdome Stadium	Team Green; 1. Simon Dominic; 2. Raiden; 3. Gray; 4. LOCO; 5. Siena Girls; 6. MIU; 7. Queen Nara; 8. Jetegg; 9. 4Eve; Team Silver; 1. BamBam; 2. CL; 3. Inside Core; 4. AK; 5. HyunA; 6. MakeYouFreak; 7. Faahsai & Master Mind; 8. LAZ1; 9. Juncoco	
7	June 23	Seoul, South Korea	Jamsil Sports Complex	Team Yellow; 1. Zico; 2. Swings; 3. BtoB; 4. Ash Island; 5. Kwon Eun-bi; 6. Shaun; 7. Wooxi; 8. ZB & Ation; 9. Youkeep; Team Green; 1. Sunmi; 2. Woo Won-jae; 3. Sik-K; 4. Coogie; 5. Haon; 6. STAYC; 7. Blackswan; 8. AK; 9. Cream; 10. Hoya; 11. S2&R2; 12. Kangho; Special guests; 1. Tanaka (Green); 2. Lee Eun-ji (Yellow); 3. Kim Hae-jun (Yellow); 4. BbangSongguk (Green)	
7	June 24	Seoul, South Korea	Jamsil Sports Complex	Team Yellow; 1. Loco; 2. Gray; 3. Oh My Girl; 4. Yugyeom; 5. Zior Park; 6. Aster & Neo; 7. Siena Girls; 8. Howmini; 9. Arkins; 10. Siro; Team Green; 1. Jay Park; 2. Jessi; 3. pH-1; 4. Leellamarz; 5. Camo; 6. Insidecore; 7. Otwo; 8. DJ Roots; 9. Eleven; 10. Denis; Special guests; 1. HAHA (Yellow); 2. Cho Sae-ho (Green); 3. Hook (Green); 4. Go Toe-kyung (Yellow)	
7	June 25	Seoul, South Korea	Jamsil Sports Complex	Team Yellow; 1. Simon Dominic; 2. DPR Live; 3. BamBam; 4. Big Naughty; 5. tripleS; 6. Raiden; 7. GroovyRoom with Blase; 8. Advanced; 9. DJ Sky with Gwangil Jo; 10. Joody; Team Green; 1. Aespa; 2. Hyuna; 3. Bibi; 4. Lee Young-ji; 5. Juncoco; 6. Toyo; 7. Sura; 8. Glory; 9. Jeiff; Special guests; 1. Egg Kim (Yellow); 2. RalRal (Green); 3. Julien Kang (Green); 4. PrimeKingz (Yellow)	
7	July 15	Incheon, South Korea	Songdo Moonlight Festival Park	Mint Team; 1. Hanna; 2. Yuria & Reverse Prime; 3. Arkins; 4. Big Naughty; 5. TPA; 6. Day Walker & AK; 7. Bibi; 8. Implantedkid; 9. Chungha; 10. Loco & Gray; 11. Aster & Neo; Orange Team; 1. JohnyRightThere; 2. Huh; 3. Epiik & Sixthema; 4. Ash Island; 5. Coogie; 6. Overdrive & For.E; 7. Groovy Room; 8. Jessi; 9. Juncoco with Ralral; 10. Jay Park	
7	July 22	Daegu, South Korea	Daegu Stadium	Green Team; 1. Troy; 2. Cherish; 3. Mirani; 4. Lee Young-ji; 5. Big Naughty; 6. An Somi; 7. Tobirush; 8. Jeiff & Tride; 9. Bewhy; 10. GroovyRoom with Blase; 11. Loco & Gray; Purple Team: 1. 5sta 2. Beom; 3. Zior Park; 4. Frame; 5. Dbobby; 6. Ash Island; 7. Justhis; 8. Ye:na; 9. pH-1; 10. Shaun; 11. Jay Park	
7	July 22	Nagoya, Japan	Aichi Sky Expo	Team Red; 1. Kwon Eun-bi; 2. Toyo; 3. Siena Girls; 4. Mamamoo+; 5. Paralyze Idea; 6. Yugyeom; 7. AK; 8. Insidecore; 9. Treasure; 10. Kara; Team Orange; 1. Hyunah; 2. Be'O; 3. KDH; 4. Sik-K; 5. Glory; 6. Coogie & Woo Won-jae; 7. Advanced; 8. Hyuna; 9. Juncoco; 10. Sunmi	
7	July 23	Nagoya, Japan	Aichi Sky Expo	Team Red; 1. Hyunah; 2. Chanmina; 3. Siena Girls; 4. Haon; 5. Advanced; 6. AK; 7. pH-1; 8. Loco & Gray; 9. Shaun; 10. Daesung (D-Lite); Team Orange; 1. Glory; 2. Big Naughty; 3. Sura; 4. Giriboy & Kid Milli; 5. Juncoco; 6. Aster & Neo; 7. Super Junior-D&E; 8. Insidecore; 9. Jay Park	
7	July 29	Busan, South Korea	Busan Osiria Showplex	Blue Team; 1. B.A.S.E; 2. DJ Winner; 3. Madik; 4. Bibi; 5. An Somi; 6. Smasher; 7. Chungha; 8. Jessi; 9. Insidecore; 10. Zico; Red Team; 1. Kio; 2. Camo; 3. Jidanwoo; 4. Tanaka; 5. Tricky; 6. DPR Live; 7. GroovyRoom with Blase; 8. Simon Dominic; 9. Aster & Neo; 10. Jay Park	
7	July 29	Tokyo, Japan	Belluna Dome	Blue Team; 1. Seorin; 2. Haon; 3. Eleven; 4. Yugyeom; 5. Glory; 6. Hyundai; 7. Paralyze Idea; 8. Ateez; 9. AK; 10. Daesung (D-Lite); Red Team; 1. KDH; 2. Sik-K; 3. Toyo; 4. Loco; 5. Wooxi; 6. Mamamoo+; 7. Juncoco; 8. Chanyeol & Sehun; 9. Nichkhun & Jun. K 10. Raiden	
7	July 30	Tokyo, Japan	Belluna Dome	Blue Team; 1. Eleven; 2. Kwon Eun-bi; 3. Wooxi; 4. Ash Island; 5. AK; 6. pH-1; 7. Aster & Neo; 8. Sunmi; 9. Insidecore; 10. Jay Park; Red Team; 1. Sungyoo; 2. Chanmina; 3. Glory; 4. Be'O; 5. Advanced; 6. Big Naughty; 7. Juncoco; 8. Gray; 9. Shaun; 10. Taemin	
7	August 5	Daejeon, South Korea	Mokwon University	Olive Team; 1. Scar; 2. Kade; 3. Siz & Dee Eye; 4. Ezuz; 5. Overdrive & For.E; 6. Big Naughty; 7. Bibi; 8. PH-1; 9. Sura; 10. GroovyRoom with Blase; 11. Jay Park; Pink Team; 1. Techzin; 2. Awesome; 3. BAE173; 4. Atommy & Aponix; 5. Coogie; 6. Rude B with Foxylicious; 7. Youkeep; 8. Hyuna; 9. Gray; 10. Loco; 11. Aster & Neo	
7	August 12	Suwon, South Korea	Suwon World Cup Auxiliary Stadium	Pink Team; 1. Qyu with MC Nolboo; 2. Lil Cherry & Goldbuuda; 3. Stefano and Ruta; 4. Paralyze Idea; 5. Woodz; 6. Juncoco; 7. Sandara Park; 8. Loco & Gray; 9. Insidecore; 10. Jessi; Green Team; 1. Zior Park; 2. Benzera; 3. Ash Island; 4. An Somi; 5. Bewhy; 6. Bibi; 7. Aster and Neo; 8. GroovyRoom with Gemini; 9. Zico	
7	August 19	Sokcho, South Korea	Hanwha Resort Seorak	Blue Team; 1. Ruha & Ahim; 2. Wooxi; 3. Zior Park; 4. Sura; 5. Woo Won-jae; 6. Aster & Neo; 7. Big Naughty; 8. Loco & Gray; 9. Raiden; Orange Team; 1. Serri & Suvin; 2. Siena Girls; 3. Lee Young-ji; 4. Bibi; 5. Advanced; 6. AK; 7. Jessi; 8. Shaun; 9. Jay Park	
7	August 26	Jeju, South Korea	Jeju Stadium	Emerald Team; 1. Newg; 2. Huh; 3. Be'O; 4. Woodz; 5. Advanced; 6. Sura; 7. Chung Ha; 8. Swings; 9. Shaun; 10. Insidecore; Coral Team; 1. Kyte; 2. An Somi; 3. Mewloud; 4. Bibi; 5. Teen Top; 6. Aster & Neo; 7. Sunmi; 8. Jessi; 9. Dynamic Duo	
7	List of cancelled dates				
7	July 15–16	Osaka, Japan	Maishima Sports Island		

=== 2024 ===
Edition	Date	Location	Venue	Line-up	Ref.
8	June 1	Hong Kong	AXA x WONDERLAND	Red Team; 1. Jay Park; 2. Loco; 3. STAYC; 4. 姚琛 (Yao Chen); 5. PACT派克特; 6. Aster & Neo; 7. Siena Girls; 8. DJ Sally; Purple Team; 1. Hyuna; 2. Yugyeom; 3. TripleS; 4. InsideCore; 5. AK; 6. Cream; 7. ZB & ATION	
8	June 2	Hong Kong	AXA x WONDERLAND	Red Team; 1. Jessi; 2. Kwon Eun-Bi; 3. Tony Yu 余景天; 4. 82Major; 5. TIAB; 6. Raiden; 7. OTWO; 8. DJ ROOTS; 9. WOOXI; 10. Ari; Purple Team; 1. Rain; 2. Gray; 3. pH-1 (rapper); 4. Lolly Talk; 5. Glory; 6. Sura; 7. WHYBEATZ; 8. HANNA	
8	June 7	Dubai, United Arab Emirates	Dubai Festival City	Purple Team; 1. Benny Benassi; 2. Simon Dominic; 3. Liu; 4. TripleS; 5. Blackswan; 6. OTWO; Orange Team; 1. Jessi; 2. Big Naughty; 3. Glory; 4. Nicky Romero	
8	June 8	Dubai, United Arab Emirates	Dubai Festival City	Purple Team; 1. pH-1; 2. Danny Neville; 3. Sorn; 4. Tayeb Santo; 5. Maxi Zee; 6. AK; Orange Team: 1. DJ Snake; 2. CL; 3. 82Major; 4. Nicole; 5. InsideCore; 6. Aster & Neo	
8	July 5	Seoul, South Korea	Korea International Exhibition Center	Yellow Team; 1. Zico; 2. Kang Daniel; 3. Baekho; 4. Woo Won Jae; 5. Coogie; 6. Lun8; 7. Hyo; 8. Sura; 9. ZB & ATION; 10. Eleven; 11. Chuu; Green Team; 1. Hwasa; 2. Chung Ha; 3. Hyuna; 4. Huta; 5. Fromis 9; 6. Aster & Neo; 7. Advanced; 8. Soyee & Vaha; 9. Ari	
8	July 6	Seoul, South Korea	Korea International Exhibition Center	Yellow Team; 1. Changmo; 2. Sunmi; 3. Kiss of Life; 4. Kwon Eun-bi; 5. Big Naughty; 6. AK; 7. YE:NA; 8. Siena Girls; 9. Hanna; 10. Queen Wasabi, (special guest); Green Team; 1. Jay Park; 2. Minho; 3. Yugyeom; 4. Giriboy; 5. Lee Young-ji; 6. P1Harmony; 7. InsideCore; 8. OTWO; 9. Hoya; 10. BobbleHead; 11. Huanah; 12. UV, (special guest); 13. Sia Jiwoo, (special guest)	
8	July 7	Seoul, South Korea	Korea International Exhibition Center	Yellow Team; 1. Taemin; 2. Loco; 3. Gray; 4. PH-1; 5. YooA; 6. 82Major; 7. GroovyRoom with Blase; 8. Cream X Pure100%; 9. DJ Roots; 10. Toyo; 11. Siro; 12. Hook, (special guest); Green Team; 1. Simon Dominic; 2. Nayeon; 3. WayV; 4. Jessi; 5. Bibi; 6. Raiden; 7. Glory; 8. Jeride; 9. Wooxi; 10. Loa; 11. NeedMoreCash, (special guest); 12. Chi Yeeun, (special guest); 13. Lee Suji, (speceial guest)	
8	July 13	Jeju, South Korea	Jeju Stadium	Emerald Team; 1. Epik High; 2. Sura; 3. Big Naughty; 4. Tri.be; 5. Kik50; 6. GroovyRoom with Blase; 7. OTWO; 8. Toyo; 9. Lockersbeen & Kazu; Coral Team; 1. Yeeun; 2. Yena; 3. Daniel Jikal; 4. Sakazan & K-Jin; 5. Chu Jung; 6. Highlight; 7. Bibi; 8. Lee Young-ji; 9. Mewloud; 10. Minsu	
8	July 13	Fukuoka, Japan	Uminonakamichi Seaside Park Open Air Theater	Purple Team; 1. CL; 2. Loco; 3. Baekho; 4. Kang Daniel; 5. Yugyeom; 6. Aster & Neo; 7. Cream; 8. Qwerty; Pink Team; 1. Gray; 2. PH-1; 3. Fromis 9; 4. Ash Island; 5. Evnne; 6. Raiden; 7. InsideCore; 8. Tana	
8	July 20	Daegu, South Korea	Daegu Stadium	Purple Team; 1. Rain (entertainer); 2. Changmo; 3. Chungha; 4. B.I; 5. Kiss of Life; 6. Kim Seungmin; 7. OTWO; 8. ZB & ATION; 9. D-STEAL; 10. LockersBeen & Kazu; Yellow Team; 1. Loco; 2. Gray; 3. Sistar19; 4. Lee Young-ji; 5. Vanner; 6. Kik50; 7. Aster & Neo; 8. YE:NA; 9. Tillit; 10. Sakazan & K-Jin; 11. Hanna	
8	July 27	Busan, South Korea	항친수공원 North Port Waterfront Park	Yellow Team; 1. Simon Dominic; 2. Baekho; 3. Treasure; 4. Fromis 9; 5. Ash Island; 6. Kik50; 7. Aster & Neo; 8. Advanced; 9. Musik; 10. Kade; 11. LockersBeen & Kazu; Green Team; 1. Sunmi; 2. Ten; 3. Yugyeom; 4. Lee Young-ji; 5. Lee Chae-yeon; 6. Coogie; 7. GroovyRoom; 8. Hoya; 9. Madik; 10. Paralyze Idea; 11. Sakazan & K-Jin	
8	July 27	Tokyo, Japan	Sea Forest Waterway	Yellow Team; 1. Kang Daniel; 2. Changmo; 3. Kwon Eun-bi; 4. Oneus; 5. Celest1a; 6. Raiden; 7. AK; 8. Akira; Green Team; 1. Jay Park; 2. Gray; 3. Big Naughty; 4. Yena; 5. Noa; 6. Wooxi; 7. Eleven; 8. Toyo	
8	July 28	Tokyo, Japan	Sea Forest Waterway	Yellow Team; 1. Simon Dominic; 2. Kwon Eun-bi; 3. Coogie; 4. TripleS; 5. InsideCore; 6. Aster & Neo; 7. Aoy; Green Team; 1. Jessi; 2. &Team; 3. Loco; 4. Ash Island; 5. Big Naughty; 6. Noa; 7. Glory; 8. Hanna; 9. KDH	
8	August 3	Incheon, South Korea	SangSang Platform	Orange Team; 1. Jay Park; 2. Chung Ha; 3. Bibi; 4. Big Naughty; 5. Woodie Gochild; 6. Trade L 7. Ezuz, (special guest); 8. Aster & Neo; 9. Epik & Six Thema; 10. Arkins & Castle J 11. Cold; 12. Leeik; Mint Team; 1. Changmo; 2. Huta; 3. Seo Eunkwang, (special guest); 4. Fromis 9; 5. Ash Island; 6. Oneus; 7. Juncoco; 8. Day Walker & AK; 9. Bobblehead; 10. Hendorphin; 11. Joody	
8	August 10	Daejeon, South Korea	Mokwon University	Olive Team; 1. Dynamic Duo; 2. Highlight; 3. Coogie; 4. Oneus; 5. Lee Young-ji; 6. Homies, (special guest); 7. Cosmickey & Sky; 8. S2 & R2; 9. Bobblehead Music; 10. Siz & H93; 11. KDH; Pink Team; 1. Loco; 2. Chung Ha; 3. Hui; 4. Ash Island; 5. Kiss of Life; 6. Juncoco; 7. Youkeep; 8. iWon & Danielle; 9. Minchae; 10. Foxylicious	
8	August 17	Sokcho, South Korea	Hanwha Resort Seorak Sorano	Blue Team; 1. Rain; 2. Changmo; 3. Kwon Eun-bi; 4. Kiss of Life; 5. Chuu; 6. Soyee & Vaha; 7. Aster & Neo; 8. Wooxi; 9. Windy; Orange Team; 1. CL; 2. Loco; 3. Gray; 4. Baekho; 5. Hui; 6. Woo Won Jae; 7. Lightsum; 8. InsideCore; 9. OTWO; 10. Siena Girls; 11. Toyo	
8	August 24	Suwon, South Korea	University of Suwon	Pink Team; 1. Hwasa; 2. Onew; 3. B.I; 4. Big Naughty; 5. H1-Key; 6. Cream; 7. Sakazan & K-Jin; 8. Lockers Been & Loki; 9. Bliss; Green Team; 1. Loco; 2. Gray; 3. Lee Young-ji; 4. Henry; 5. LilBoi; 6. Kik50; 7. GroovyRoom with Blase; 8. ZB & Ation; 9. Cheez; 10. Ruha & Ahim	
8	August 24	Sentosa, Singapore	Siloso Beach	Orange Team; 1. Rain; 2. Sandara Park; 3. Kwon Eun-bi; 4. Kid Milli; 5. Lullaboy; 6. Aster & Neo; 7. Siena Girls; 8. Nicole Chen; 9. Ghetto; 10. Mskuan; 11. Jestinna Kuan, (special guest); Blue Team; 1. Jay Park; 2. Jessi; 3. Viviz; 4. Alyph; 5. InsideCore; 6. OTWO; 7. Raw; 8. Farah Farz	
8	August 25	Sentosa, Singapore	Siloso Beach	Orange Team; 1. CL; 2. Loco; 3. Chung Ha; 4. Sorn; 5. Raiden; 6. Glory; 7. Jade Rasif; 8. Blink; 9. Sihk; Blue Team; 1. BamBam; 2. Bibi; 3. Team Bebe; 4. Haven; 5. AK; 6. Wooxi; 7. Gemstarr	
8	August 31	Yeosu, South Korea	Yeosu Expo Sky Tower	Navy Team; 1. Jessi; 2. Yena; 3. Giriboy; 4. Kiss of Life; 5. Oneus; 6. InsideCore; 7. YE:NA; 8. ZB & Ation; 9. DJ Roots; 10. GG; Yellow Team; 1. Changmo; 2. Solar; 3. Baekho; 4. B.I; 5. Sky with NorthFaceGawd; 6. Smasher; 7. Toyo; 8. Sakazan & K-JIn; 9. Lockers Been & Loki	
8	List of cancelled dates				
8	May 18–19	Xiamen, China	Fantawild Tong'an		

=== 2025 ===
Edition	Date	Location	Venue	Line-up	Ref.
9	February 22	Manila, Philippines	Quirino Grandstand	Yellow Team; 1. Dynamic Duo; 2. Chanyeol; 3. Hwasa; 4. B.I; 5. Lee Chae-yeon; 6. Raiden; 7. J.E.B; 8. Apro; 9. Thea Astley; Blue Team; 1. Imlay; 2. Kim Jong-kook; 3. STAYC; 4. DJ Roots; 5. Baekho; 6. Kwon Eun-bi; 7. ZB&ATION; 8. Epik High	
9	February 23	Manila, Philippines	Quirino Grandstand	Blue Team; 1. Jessi; 2. Gray; 3. BamBam; 4. Kang Daniel; 5. Viviz; 6. Aster & Neo; 7. Siena Girls; 8. Mar Vista; 9. BILIB and Zela; Yellow Team; 1. 2SPADE; 2. U-Kwon; 3. Kenet; 4. Skull & Haha; 5. Yang Se-chan; 6. Sulreggae; 7. Reddy; 8. Sunmi; 9. Hyolyn; 10. Oh My Girl; 11. Insidecore	
9	April 12	Hainan, China	Changying Park, Haikou	Blue Team; 1. Henry Lau; 2. WayV; 3. Next1de; 4. TF_ING; 5. Lizzy Wang; 6. Yao Xiaotang; 7. James Lee; 8. Vina; 9. Tony Yu; 10. Steelo.Z; Green Team; 1. Jessi; 2. BamBam; 3. Gen1es; 4. BTX; 5. You; 6. Rich Pig; 7. Sevennine; 8. Stella#183; 9. Caelan; 10. Yasen; 11. Yan An	
9	April 13	Hainan, China	Changying Park, Haikou	Blue Team; 1. Tiger JK; 2. Yoon Mi-rae; 3. pH-1; 4. Ailee; 5. Jia; 6. Zhou Zhennan; 7. Rikimaru; 8. Kuromi; 9. Lizzy Wang; 10. Nelly; 11. AISTA; 12. YUE; Green Team; 1. Jay Park; 2. Tablo; 3. Samuel; 4. Tizzy T 5. Yao Chen; 6. Wu Yaotao; 7. Aero Xiao; 8. Luo Yi Zhou; 9. Victor Ma	
9	July 4	Seoul, South Korea	Korea International Exhibition Center	Yellow Team; 1. J.Y. Park; 2. Super Junior-D&E; 3. Itzy; 4. Coogie; 5. Chung Ha; 6. Shaun; 7. Siena Girls; 8. Aoy; 9. Pure 100%; 10. Potaito; Green Team; 1. Epik High; 2. Baekho; 3. Sik-K; 4. Haon; 5. Kep1er; 6. Billlie; 7. Aster & Neo; 8. Glory; 9. Madik & Danielle; 10. Minky; Special guests; 1. Kim Won-hun, Cho Jin-se, Eom Ji-yoon (Yellow); 2. Chungju Ji-ssi (Green)	
9	July 5	Seoul, South Korea	Korea International Exhibition Center	Green Team; 1. Jay Park; 2. Karina; 3. fromis_9 4. Ten; 5. Lee Young-ji; 6. AK; 7. Gongstar & Howl; 8. Wooxi; 9. Arkins; 10. Roha; Yellow Team; 1. Huta; 2. Jeon Somi; 3. Loco; 4. RGP; 5. tripleS; 6. Insidecore; 7. El Capitxn; 8. Eleven with Foxylicious; 9. Yooni, Ashid & 9ine6ix; Special guests; 1. We Dem Boyz (Yellow); 2. Jaessbee (Yellow)	
9	July 6	Seoul, South Korea	Korea International Exhibition Center	Green Team; 1. 2NE1; 2. Crush; 3. Lee Chang-sub; 4. Kiss of Life; 5. pH-1; 6. Raiden; 7. DJ Roots; 8. Toyo; 9. Hanna; Yellow Team; 1. Kai; 2. Kwon Eun-bi; 3. Gray; 4. Ash Island; 5. Artms; 6. GroovyRoom; 7. Juncoco; 8. Cream; 9. Smasher; 10. Groz; Special guests; 1. Beatpella House (Green); 2. Team BEBE (Yellow)	
9	July 26	Busan, South Korea	Busan North Port	Pink Team; 1. Monsta X 2. Jeon Somi; 3. pH-1; 4. Lil Boi; 5. Big Naughty; 6. Ash Island; 7. Woodie Gochild; 8. 82Major; 9. Raiden; 10. Madik & Danielle; 11. Musik; 12. Stay; Yellow Team; 1. 2NE1; 2. Highlight; 3. Baekho; 4. Kang Daniel; 5. Changmo; 6. Insidecore; 7. Jeride; 8. Ye:na; 9. ZB&ATION; 10. Cherish	
9	August 23	Sokcho, South Korea	Hanwha Resort Seorak	Blue Team; 1. Lee Young-ji; 2. Baekho; 3. Soyou; 4. fromis_9 5. Billlie; 6. Kik50; 7. Insidecore; 8. Cheez & Wooxi; 9. ZB&ATION; 10. Siro; Orange Team; 1. Epik High; 2. Changmo; 3. Chung Ha; 4. Huta; 5. Ash Island; 6. Cravity; 7. Siena Girls; 8. Toyo; 9. AK; MC; 1. Park Jae-min	
9	August 30	Sentosa, Singapore	Siloso Beach	Blue Team; 1. Raw; 2. Sorn & Seungyeon; 3. Cream; 4. EXID; 5. Advanced; 6. Raiden; 7. Taemin; Pink Team; 1. Kiara; 2. WhyLucas; 3. Toyo; 4. Huta; 5. Minho	
9	August 31	Sentosa, Singapore	Siloso Beach	Blue Team; 1. RT; 2. Anson Lo; 3. Roots; 4. Ash Island; 5. ZB & Ation; 6. Jay B; Pink Team; 1. Estelle Fly; 2. Joleen; 3. Ari; 4. Junny; 5. Yena; 6. Lee Young-ji; 7. Insidecore; 8. 2NE1	
9	September 6	Bali, Indonesia	Atlas Beach Club	Green Team; 1. 2NE1; 2. Sam Feldt; 3. ASC2NT; 4. Raiden; 5. AK; Yellow Team; 1. Chanyeol; 2. Baekho; 3. Eleven	
9	September 7	Bali, Indonesia	Atlas Beach Club	Green Team; 1. Nicky Romero; 2. pH-1; 3. Insidecore; 4. StarBe; Yellow Team; 1. Zico; 2. Kwon Eun-bi; 3. Juncoco; 4. Wooxi	
9	November 8	Macau	Macau Outdoor Performance Venue	Green Team; 1. 2NE1; 2. Jay Park; 3. Jeon Somi; 4. Nowz; 5. ANKH; 6. Varo; 7. Mark Tuan; Pink Team; 1. Yuqi; 2. Univu5; 3. FF; 4. Dicky; 5. Lizzy; 6. Nanon; 7. Carpick	
9	November 9	Macau	Macau Outdoor Performance Venue	Green Team; 1. Rain; 2. Hyuna; 3. STAYC; 4. Say My Name; 5. Tyson Yoshi; 6. Artest; 7. Thera; 8. Breeze; Pink Team; 1. Kun; 2. Bibi; 3. Ateez; 4. Lit Rain; 5. YIF; 6. Lizzy; 7. Liyuu	
9	November 15	Ho Chi Minh City, Vietnam	Van Phuc City	Blue Team; 1. Rain; 2. Sandara Park; 3. Min; 4. Skull & Hana; 5. Tempest; 6. Dương Domic; 7. Shaun; 8. T-Tina & Kaziann; Pink Team; 1. Hieuthuhai; 2. Shownu X Hyungwon; 3. Kwon Eunbi; 4. Tlinh; 5. tripleS; 6. Insidecore; 7. TPA	
9	November 16	Ho Chi Minh City, Vietnam	Van Phuc City	Blue Team; 1. EXID; 2. B.I; 3. Tóc Tiên; 4. All(H)ours; 5. Raiden; 6. Glory; 7. Sungyoo; Pink Team; 1. Jay Park; 2. Hwasa; 3. Soobin; 4. Chi Pu; 5. Quang Hùng MasterD; 6. DCR Milda; 7. ZB & Ation; 8. VA & Henry Maze	

=== 2026 ===
Edition	Date	Location	Venue	Line-up	Ref.
10	July 24	Seoul, South Korea	KINTEX Outdoor Global stage	Yellow Team; 1. KYSS; 2. Madein; 3. Toyo with Junil, Roic of AGD; 4. Alpha Drive One; 5. Juncoco; 6. Lee Youngji; 7. Simon Dominic; 8. Diplo; Green Team; 1. The Jayne; 2. KickFlip; 3. Cream × Pure 100%; 4. Huta of BTOB; 5. Changmo; 6. Kiss of Life; 7. Aster; 8. Taemin	
10	July 25	Seoul, South Korea	KINTEX Outdoor Global stage	Yellow Team; 1. DJ Minky; 2. Zelo; 3. Jeonghyeon; 4. H1GHR Music (pH-1, Big Naughty, Lilboi, Woodie Gochild); 5. Bibi; 6. Gray; 7. AK; 8. Shownu × Hyungwon; 9. Loco; Green Team; 1. Eleven; 2. Billlie; 3. Yuka; 4. Karina; 5. Raiden; 6. Nghtmre; 7. Jay Park	
10	July 26	Seoul, South Korea	KINTEX Outdoor Global stage	Yellow Team; 1. Ekho; 2. H1-Key; 3. Astro Voize with WAYF Boys; 4. Dayoung; 5. Rain; 6. Riize; 7. Insidecore; 8. Maddix; 9. Zico; Green Team; 1. Dearboi; 2. ZB & Ation; 3. 82Major; 4. KC (Sik-K, Haon, Woomin, JMIN); 5. Lil Moshpit with DJ Pool; 6. J.Y. Park; 7. Taeyong; 8. Sunmi	
10	August 8	Busan, South Korea	Lotte World Adventure Busan	Pink Team; 1. J.Y.Park; 2. Kai; 3. KC (Sik-K, Haon, Nowimyoung, JMIN); 4. KickFlip; 5. Raiden; 6. Redshot & Meek; 7. Danielle & Jerom; 8. Lizy; Yellow Team; 1. Jay Park; 2. Simon Dominic; 3. Yena; 4. Jeon Somi; 5. Classy; 6. Insidecore; 7. Glory; 8. Roren	
