= Skull (singer) =

South Korean reggae singer

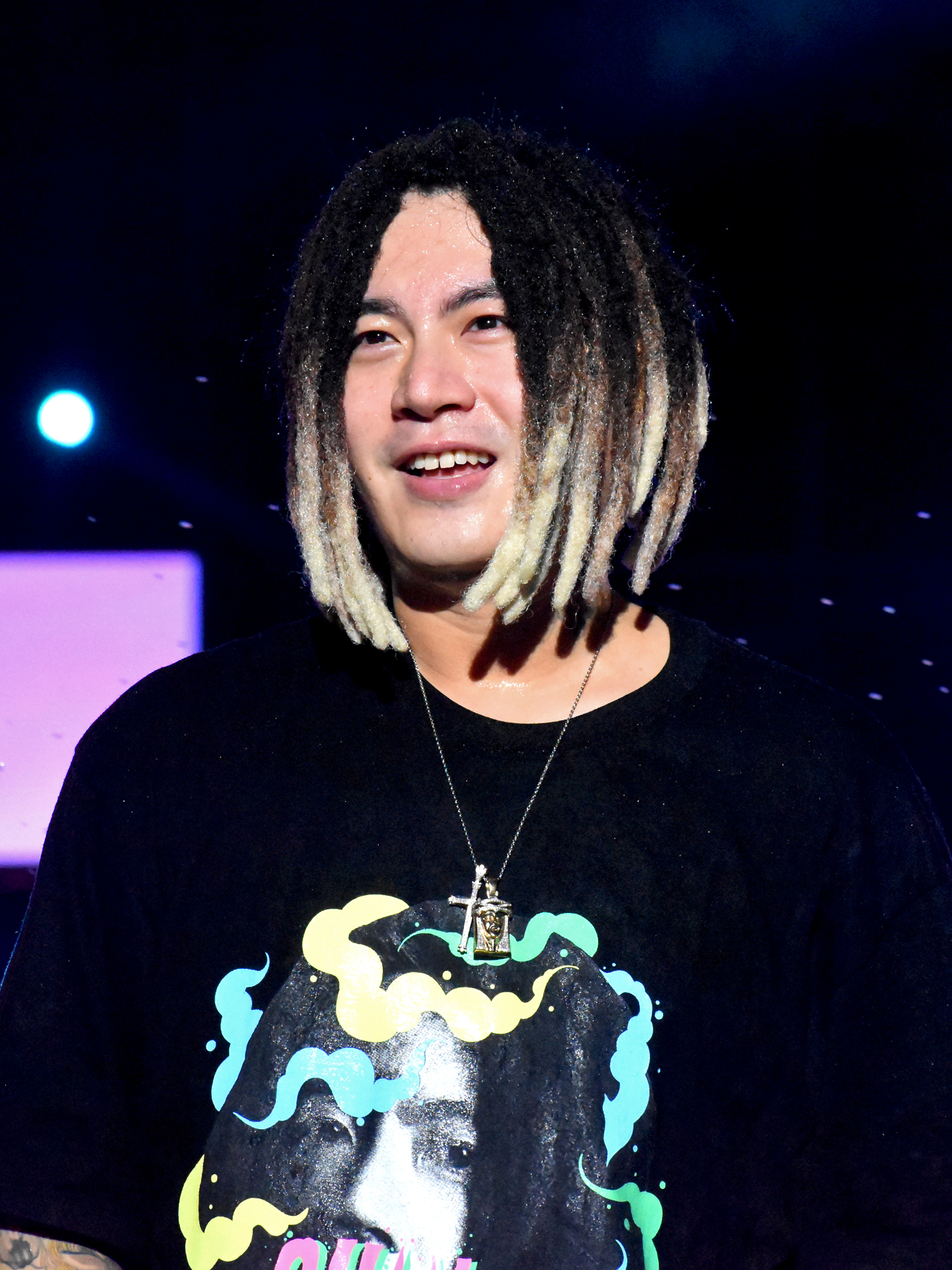
- Skull at the Busan Sea Festival, August 2018

Background information
- Born: Jo Sung-jin; November 2, 1979 (age 47); Seoul
- Genre: Reggae
- Occupation: Singer
- Years active: 2003–present
- Labels: Quan Entertainment; Stardom Entertainment; YG Entertainment

Korean name
- Hangul: 조성진
- RR: Jo Seongjin
- MR: Cho Sŏngjin

Jo Sung-jin (Korean: 조성진; born November 2, 1979), better known by his stage name Skull (Korean: 스컬) is a South Korean reggae singer, prior member of Stony Skunk and member of Skull & Haha. He is known for his song "Love Inside" which became popular in Jamaica.

== Discography ==
=== Studio albums ===
Title	Album details	Peak chart positions	Sales
Title	Album details	KOR	Sales
King O' Irie	Released: July 17, 2014; Label: Quan Entertainment, LOEN Entertainment; Formats: CD, digital download	20	KOR: 1,020
SAJAH	Released: June 14, 2019; Label: Quan Entertainment, LOEN Entertainment; Formats: CD, digital download		

=== Extended plays ===
Title	Album details	Peak chart positions	Sales
Title	Album details	KOR	Sales
Korean Reggae (한국 레게)	Released: June 1, 2011; Label: Brand New Stardom, NHN Entertainment; Formats: CD, digital download	—	—N/a

=== Singles ===
Title	Year	Peak chart positions	Sales (DL)	Album
Title	Year	KOR	Sales (DL)	Album
"Don't Walk Away" feat. Spragga Benz	2011	—	KOR: 42,049	Korean Reggae
"Perfect Game" with YDG	2011	91	KOR: 121,976	Non-album singles
"I Live Like This" (나 이러고 살아) feat. Park Hyo-shin	2012	20	KOR: 301,550	Non-album singles
"Trash" (쓰레기) feat. Rooftop Moonlight	2012	51	KOR: 259,549	Non-album singles
"Brilliant Is..." with Haha, Geeks, Zico, Mad Clown, Swings, Double K, Zizo, Soul Dive, Heo Kyung-hwan, Kim Ji-min feat. Gill, Jungin	2013	75	—N/a	Non-album singles
"Keep On Pushing"	2014	—	—N/a	Non-album singles
"I'm Getting Married" (결혼해요) feat. Yujin	2014	68	KOR: 58,349	King O' Irie
"Get Rich" feat. Sizzla	2016	—	—N/a	Non-album singles
"Never Cry" feat. Park Beom, Oh Seul-gi	2016	—	—N/a	Non-album singles
"Crazy" feat. Verbal Jint, KittiB	2017	—	—N/a	Non-album singles
"Still" (아직도 니가) with Koonta	2017	—	—N/a	Non-album singles
"Here To Stay" with Tiger JK	2017	—	—N/a	Non-album singles
"Reggae Army" with Koonta feat. Rueed	2017	—	—N/a	Non-album singles
"WHOO" feat. ㅡMOMMY SON	2021	—		
"—" denotes releases that did not chart.
