= RGP (duo) =

South Korean reggae duo

RGP 레게 강 같은 평화
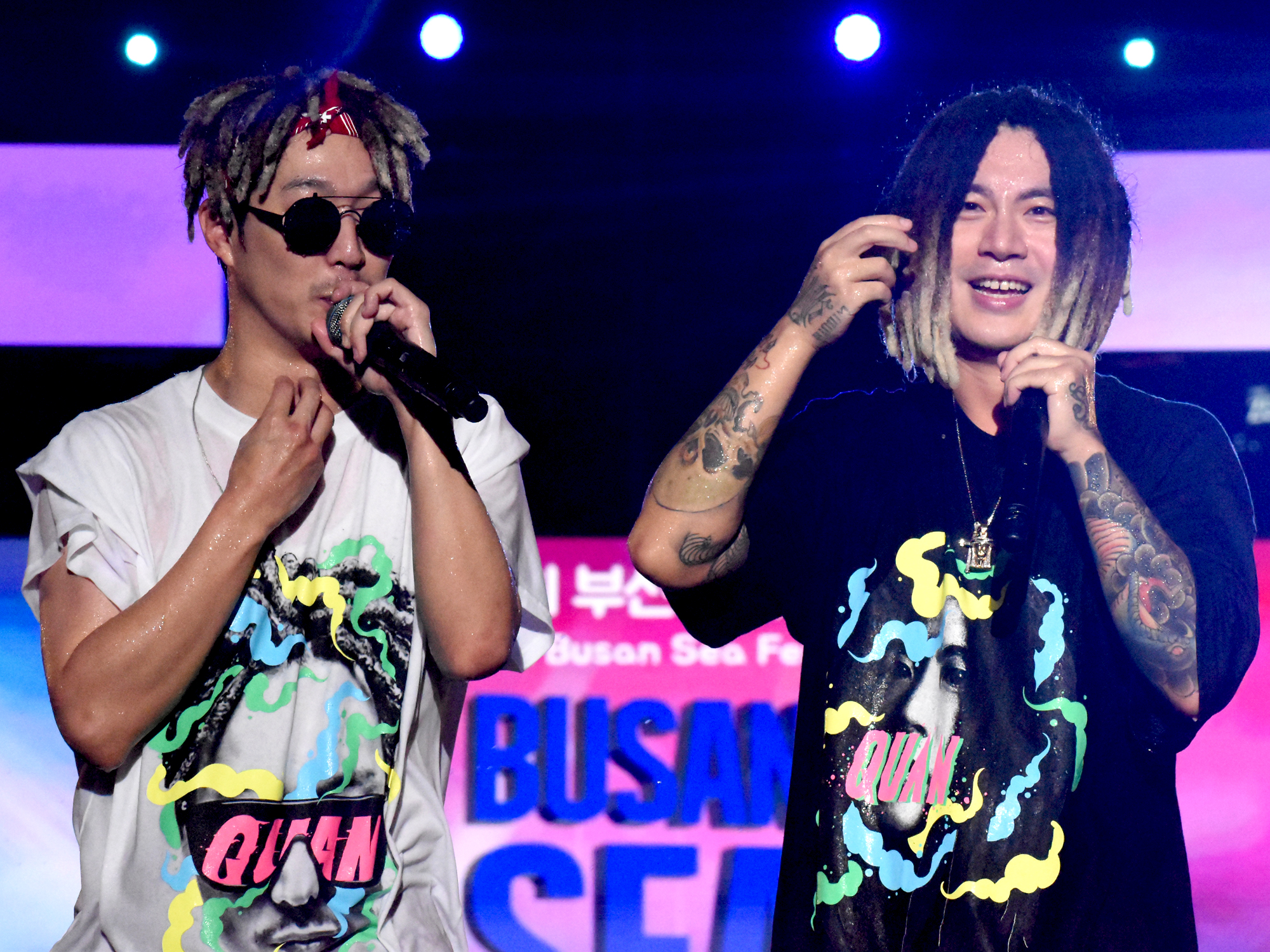
- RGP at the Busan Sea Festival, August 2018

Background information
- Origin: Seoul, South Korea
- Genres: Dance; reggae; hip hop
- Years active: 2012–present
- Label: Quan Entertainment
- Members: Skull; Haha
- Website: quanent.com

RGP (Korean: 레게 강 같은 평화; lit. 'Reggae Peace like a River'), formerly known as Skull & Haha (스컬&하하), is a South Korean duo formed by Quan Entertainment in Seoul, South Korea. They debuted on July 30, 2012, with Ya Man!!.

== Discography ==
=== Album ===
Title	Album details	Peak chart positions	Sales
Title	Album details	KOR	Sales
No Problem!!	Released: October 18, 2018; Label: Quan Entertainment, KT Music; Formats: CD, digital download; Track listing: 1. Reggae Peace like a River (레게 강 같은 평화); 2. We Can Love Again (ft. Byul); 3. A Crying Day 울던날 (ft. Jo Jang Hyuk); 4. We Nice (ft. Koonta); 5. Welcome To My World; 6. Dang Diggi Bang (feat. Beenie Man)(Re-Arranged Ver.); 7. Laugh (웃어); 8. Soca Fever (feat. Cool Running); 9. Love Inside (feat. Stephen Marley) (Original Ver.); 10. Together (함께)	TBA	TBA

=== Extended plays ===
Title	Album details	Peak chart positions	Sales
Title	Album details	KOR	Sales
Ya Man!!	Released: July 30, 2012; Label: Quan Entertainment, KT Music; Formats: CD, digital download	51	—N/a

=== Singles ===
Title	Year	Peak chart positions	Sales (DL)	Album
Title	Year	KOR	Sales (DL)	Album
"Waikiki Brothers" (와이키키 브라더스)	2012	—	—N/a	Ya Man!!
"Busan Vacance" (부산 바캉스)	2012	11	KOR: 837,985	Ya Man!!
"Donam-dong Melody" (돈암동 멜로디)	2013	41	KOR: 118,146	Non-album singles
"Ragga Muffin"	2013	91	KOR: 48,875	Non-album singles
"Beautiful Girl" feat. Kwon Jung-yeol	2015	42	KOR: 70,190	Non-album singles
"Love Inside" feat. Stephen Marley	2016	—	—N/a	Non-album singles
"Don't Laugh" (웃지마) feat. MC Minzy	2016	—	—N/a	Non-album singles
"Buzzer Beater" feat. M.Tyson	2016	—	—N/a	Non-album singles
"Nora" feat. G.Soul	2017	—	—N/a	Non-album singles
"Laugh" (웃어)	2018	—	—N/a	Non-album singles
"DANG DIGGI BANG"(당디기 방) feat. Beenie Man	2018	—	—N/a	Non-album singles
"Shot Dem" feat. Koonta and M.Tyson	2019	—	—N/a	Non-album singles
"—" denotes releases that did not chart.

=== Collaborations ===
Title	Year	Other artist(s)
"Cuban Sandwich" (쿠바 샌드위치)	2015	Yoon Jong-shin
"Listen to my world (A-ing)" (내 얘길 들어봐)	2016	Oh My Girl
"One Love"	2017	Lee Sun-bin
"FUEGO"	2019	U-Kwon (Block B)

=== Soundtrack appearances ===
Title	Year	Album
"Tabloid Truth" (위험한 소문)	2014	Tabloid Truth OST
"Summer Night" (여름 밤)	2015	Summer Night OST
"Up & Down"	2016	Two Yoo Project Sugar Man OST

== Filmography ==
=== Television appearances ===
Year	Title	Network	Notes
2016	Two Yoo Project Sugar Man	JTBC	
2018	Talk To You 2	JTBC	

== Concerts and shows ==
=== Concert participation ===
Title	Date	Venue	Network
Beyond LIVE - 2020 K-Pop x K-Art Concert Super KPA	November 27, 2020	N/A	Naver V Live
