= Big Picture (web series) =

South Korea Web Television

- Big Picture in Vietnam Poster
- Original title: 빅픽처
- Genre: Web television
- Presented by: Kim Jong-kook; Haha
- Country of origin: South Korea
- Original language: Korean
- No. of seasons: 4
- No. of episodes: Season 1: 105 Episodes; Season 2: 93 Episodes; Special Season: 63 Episodes; Season 3: 56 Episodes (list of episodes)

Production
- Executive producer: Yeo Woon-hyuk
- Production locations: South Korea; Vietnam
- Production companies: Mystic Entertainment, SM Culture & Contents

Original release
- Network: Naver Corporation
- Release: September 4, 2017 – May 3, 2019

Big Picture (Korean: 빅픽처), is a South Korean Web television program on Naver hosted by Kim Jong-kook and Haha along with Kim Kap Jin (Kim Jong-kook's manager) acting as an audience on the show. It is aired every Monday through Wednesday and Friday at 6.00pm KST on Naver and V Live.

== Season 1 ==
There are a total of 105 episode for Season 1 which runs from 4 May 2017 to 13 December 2017. Episodes 1 to 63 are on their MADE show, which acts as a temporary replacement for Big Picture. Starting from episodes 64, the Big Picture episodes are revealed, with the Big Picture being Lee Kwang-soo.

== Season 2 ==
Season 2 runs from 5 March 2018 to June 6, 2018 with a total of 93 episodes. On Season 2 of Big Picture, they wanted to make a blockbuster movie, however, they do not have much budget to start with. Therefore, they started the MADE show once again.

Episode 1 to episode 91 are their MADE Show where Kim Jong Kook and Haha will introduce the different investors from the various companies who choose to invest on Big Picture. Various guests are also being featured in the show. Along with 2 other bonus episodes, (episode 92 and episode 93) were clips that was not aired previously on episode 1 to 91.

== Special season ==
This is a special season of Big Picture, which is known as 'Big Picture in Vietnam'. In this season, Kim Jong Kook and Haha heads to Vietnam for their PPL with Park Kwang joining them as their investor. This season runs from October 8, 2018 to December 7, 2018, with a total of 56 episodes and 8 special videos.

== Season 3 ==
Season 3 will be released starting from April 8, 2019. Haha and Kim Jong Kook will continue to work on the K-drama plan and "Made Show" from the previous two seasons. There will be a total of 56 episodes in this season.

== List of Episodes ==
=== Season 1 ===
105 Episodes

No.	Title	Original release date
1	"Kim Jong Kook and Haha's Big Picture"	September 4, 2017
2	"When variety meets reality"	September 4, 2017
3	"Whatever it is, Made will do it"	September 4, 2017
4	"How Much? Enslaved to a Budget"	September 5, 2017
5	"Should we support Samsung and LG?"	September 5, 2017
6	"Although the start is weak, the end will also be weak…?"	September 6, 2017
7	"In contact(?) with god of marketing?"	September 6, 2017
8	"Production cost defence operation"	September 11, 2017
9	"Will it open today…the CEO's wallet?"	September 11, 2017
10	"100 meters before Made"	September 11, 2017
11	"Tell me who it is! The magic lamp of advertising industry"	September 12, 2017
12	"Get Lee Sangmin to model for breo"	September 12, 2017
13	"The Made Bros vs. Sangmin"	September 13, 2017
14	"Let's pick apart Lee Sangmin, through and through"	September 13, 2017
15	"Revealing all of Lee Sang Min's risk. Inappropriate for the broadcast"	September 18, 2017
16	"MADE's first money, terms, success???"	September 18, 2017
17	"Be straightforward – How much will you give us?"	September 18, 2017
18	"We're multi-leveled? Will the MADE show be okay?"	September 19, 2017
19	"MYSTIC reaches out to the MADE Brother's black sales!?"	September 19, 2017
20	"Kookie and HaHa get a loan from SM with their bodies(?!)"	September 20, 2017
21	"Who are you? Surprise visitors!"	September 20, 2017
22	"Kookie and HaHa meet Gong Yoo?"	September 25, 2017
23	"Prelude to the first-ever BGM OST on a variety show."	September 25, 2017
24	"The contract condition! Use your strength to promote on the subway!"	September 25, 2017
25	"An unbelievable(?) request. Find a bald model!"	September 26, 2017
26	"The D-Day. Will they make their second deal?"	September 26, 2017
27	"Joy to the world! The model is here."	September 27, 2017
28	"Kim got into a real-life fight over a game. Who was the victor?"	September 27, 2017
29	"Finally the possessed Kim Sooyong"	October 2, 2017
30	"Commercial for 7 years? Lucky day for Sooyong"	October 2, 2017
31	"CEO, are we getting the deal?"	October 2, 2017
32	"Real man Jongkook becomes chatter Jongkook"	October 3, 2017
33	"EXO, BTS, Wanna One, You want to eat with me or die?"	October 3, 2017
34	"The full story of the theft"	October 4, 2017
35	"The full story of the theft, the culprit is within us!"	October 4, 2017
36	"Is it for real? Are they inviting Wanna One?"	October 9, 2017
37	"The winner of Entertainment Award is coming to mat restaurant?"	October 9, 2017
38	"The swamp of copyright"	October 9, 2017
39	"The appearance of a commercial song vending machine!"	October 10, 2017
40	"The first-ever BGM on a variety show is a tribute song?"	October 10, 2017
41	"This BGM is in the style of "Begin Again"	October 11, 2017
42	"No healing music here! How to make people laugh by singing"	October 11, 2017
43	"JongShin's Big picture: Attracting Investment From an Arabic Prince?"	October 16, 2017
44	"How to use singers with 65 years of career combined?"	October 16, 2017
45	"Delicious talk with Jong Shin who won No.1 on music charts"	October 16, 2017
46	"Jong Kook has muscles all over his body?!"	October 17, 2017
47	"The talk show under the sun. What was your best meal ever?"	October 17, 2017
48	"Out of business? No more PPL?"	October 18, 2017
49	"The Made makes their third deal! A guest from Jeju Island?"	October 18, 2017
50	"Case by Case, Made brothers, you want 900,000 won?"	October 23, 2017
51	"An alien appears. Selling your soul for money?!"	October 23, 2017
52	"Making that 900,000 won! Welcoming a pyramid scheme."	October 23, 2017
53	"A needle in a haystack. Does anyone know Dungeon & Fighter?"	October 24, 2017
54	"200,000 won vs 50,000 won. Has the battle begun?!"	October 24, 2017
55	"Unfortunately...we'll let you go, Gong Yoo"	October 25, 2017
56	"We're not kidding. Should we do Made instead of Big Picture?"	October 25, 2017
57	"Comedians from public broadcasting sweated on Big Picture"	October 30, 2017
58	"I'm the biggest gaming nerd here!"	October 30, 2017
59	"The things I've done for Dugeon & Fighter?!"	October 30, 2017
60	"Please send my daughter to an English-speaking kindergarten"	October 31, 2017
61	"A confession of a 5 year-old knocks the manager out"	October 31, 2017
62	"I would kill for the MC spot!!!"	November 1, 2017
63	"The ordeal of bank account. What did we do for the past 6 months?"	November 1, 2017
64	"Finally, let's find out! What is The Big Picture?"	November 6, 2017
65	"Keeping a secret? Who is Mr. L?"	November 6, 2017
66	"Big Picture's main character Kwang Soo came to light"	November 6, 2017
67	"Get a grip and be strong, Kwang Soo!"	November 7, 2017
68	"What if you were being watched for 6 months!?"	November 7, 2017
69	"For whom did we suffer for 6 months?!"	November 8, 2017
70	"Kookie, HaHa and Kwang Soo are really friends?"	November 8, 2017
71	"The beginning of Big Picture Kookie & HaHa's secret meeting 1"	November 13, 2017
72	"The secret hideout 1"	November 13, 2017
73	"The secret hideout 2"	November 13, 2017
74	"Desperately waiting. Kwang Soo, you are coming right...?"	November 14, 2017
75	"The beginning of Big Picture: Kookie and Haha's secret meeting 2"	November 14, 2017
76	"The shocking secret behind the hideout?!"	November 15, 2017
77	"Excited to meet Jong Kook's ladies(?)"	November 15, 2017
78	"Which planet are you from? Charming girls"	November 20, 2017
79	"Bulls are the king of animals from today?"	November 20, 2017
80	"A shocking comment by the candidate"	November 20, 2017
81	"Who's the new member?"	November 21, 2017
82	"Kwang Soo suddenly calls them"	November 21, 2017
83	"Kookie, HaHa and Kwang Soo's faceless(?) show!"	November 22, 2017
84	"Hide the cameras!"	November 22, 2017
85	"Kookie, HaHa vs Papa Smurf: What if he doesn't come?"	November 27, 2017
86	"When HaHa lost it – "Hey! Kim Jong Kook!""	November 27, 2017
87	"On a drunken night, it's okay to be childish!"	November 27, 2017
88	"Kwang Soo's habit that makes everyone baffled?!"	November 28, 2017
89	"Jong Kook vs HaHa, Kwang Soo's choice is?"	November 28, 2017
90	"HaHa's shocking statement – What's with the competition"	November 29, 2017
91	"I accuse Kwang Soo! Lee Kwang Soo, you…!"	November 29, 2017
92	"The secret of what happened at the Turbo concert"	December 4, 2017
93	"The story behind Season 2 that even Jong Kook and HaHa don't know"	December 4, 2017
94	"Who is the new member of the Big Picture season 2?"	December 4, 2017
95	"You want to escape "Big Picture"? The conclusion's already decided"	December 5, 2017
96	"Kim Jong Kook's marriage(?), a "Big Picture" exclusive?"	December 5, 2017
97	"Kwang Soo snipper, Kookie's anger-triggering broadcast"	December 6, 2017
98	"The delusion of production fee slaves for 7 months"	December 6, 2017
99	"Calling KBS and MBC, you want us to be on?!"	December 11, 2017
100	"Producer tells them the fact. Is Big Picture going down?"	December 11, 2017
101	"Is it allowed to go to washroom when they're on air?"	December 11, 2017
102	"Newsflash: Lee Kwang Soo's tongue get paralyzed while filming?!"	December 12, 2017
103	"Even Kwang Soo squirms when Jong Kook steps on him"	December 12, 2017
104	"What's this stab in the back? The enemy(?) is within us!"	December 13, 2017
105	"Anticipate it. "Big Picture" Season 2, coming soon!"	December 13, 2017

=== Season 2 ===
93 Episodes + 6 Specials

No.	Title	Original release date
1	"Beginning of the Legend, Kookie & HaHa's Made Show"	March 5, 2018
2	"Big Picture 2 Project: This Season's Lead Role is Song Jong Ki"	March 5, 2018
3	"Investment Revival(?), Those Who Want To Be Saved, Come Here"	March 5, 2018
4	"The Truth Behind Kim Jong Kook's Rumour"	March 6, 2018
5	"You're going to invest 6.7 trillion won in us?"	March 6, 2018
6	"Manager Lee Jung Eun, Do You Know Her?"	March 7, 2018
7	"Will You Go With "Big Picture 2"? Then, Write It Down!!"	March 7, 2018
8	"One Hundred Million!? Is This For Real?"	March 12, 2018
9	"Lawyer VS Lawyer(1) They Got Conned By a Conned Artist?"	March 12, 2018
10	"Lawyer VS Lawyer(2) Revenge of Angry Smurf"	March 12, 2018
10	"Lawyer VS Lawyer(2) Revenge of Angry Smurf"	March 12, 2018
11	"Lawyer VS Lawyer(3) Security That's Scarier Than the Plague"	March 13, 2018
12	""Big Picture 2" First Made – Advertisers, Come In"	March 13, 2018
13	"Failed at Being Sync, When Will You Two Do It in One Try?"	March 14, 2018
14	"People on diet, how far did you go with chicken breast?"	March 14, 2018
15	"[War against fat] Revealing the epic weights for the first time"	March 19, 2018
16	"Shocking Pictures of Before & After"	March 19, 2018
17	"Got Beaten while on Air?.avi"	March 19, 2018
18	"Life-and-Death Charm Appeal by the Hot Bodies(?)"	March 20, 2018
19	"How Far Have You Dieted?"	March 20, 2018
20	"Fight to Become the Model Between Thirsty Souls"	March 21, 2018
21	"Who Will Be the One to Lose 30kg?"	March 21, 2018
22	"Make Us Into Stars! Young Gil & Jae Jun's Infinity Challenge"	March 26, 2018
23	"Jong Kook's School Friend That's Gone with 620 Million?!"	March 26, 2018
24	"Advertiser More Than HaHa, Sudden Change of MC?"	March 26, 2018
25	"Most Important Filming in Kim Jong Kook's Life?"	March 27, 2018
26	"Namer CEO, Jong Kook's Name is Young Gil?"	March 27, 2018
27	"CEO's Shocking Remark! BBQ's Model Ha Jung Woo…"	March 28, 2018
28	"CEO & Jong Kook's Parallel Theory!"	March 28, 2018
29	"BBQ's Price Increase! The Whole Story?"	April 2, 2018
30	"HaHa, leaving the main MC position?"	April 2, 2018
31	"The apology of the CEO"	April 2, 2018
32	"We Forbid(?) Ha Jung Woo to Watch"	April 3, 2018
33	"BBQ's CEO Got Deceived?"	April 3, 2018
34	"A Drama With Song Jong Ki and Park Bo Gum?"	April 4, 2018
35	"Jong Kook's Big Picture is a Discovery of a Rookie!"	April 4, 2018
36	"Interim Checkup! We got the first investment!"	April 9, 2018
37	"What an odd occasion. JTBC's dine and dash(?)"	April 9, 2018
38	"Fact check about Kim Jong Kook's past"	April 9, 2018
39	"Jong Kook, can you pay my 20,000 won back?"	April 9, 2018
40	"Jong Kook, can you pay my 20,000 won back?"	April 9, 2018
41	"A very catchy song! Please take care of our CM song ~"	April 11, 2018
42	"Introducing my friend, the guitar legend!"	April 11, 2018
43	"Stealing CM songs from one another"	April 16, 2018
44	"Jongkook is going to burst your heart"	April 9, 2018
45	"Their natural enemy. What is Big Picture 2?"	April 16, 2018
46	"Chong Kun Dang's CM #1 CM song is?"	April 17, 2018
47	"Ahn Jae Wook's Best Proposal Song is?"	April 17, 2018
48	"The Harmful Effects of Publicly Dating"	April 18, 2018
49	"Do you know "DodgeballKing Tongki?""	April 18, 2018
50	"A CEO that's different night and day?!"	April 23, 2018
51	"The 5 members of the dodgeball team!"	April 23, 2018
52	"Clubbing CEO's whistling skills revealed"	April 23, 2018
53	"Furious Jong Kook Appears"	April 24, 2018
54	"Cast Park Joon Hyung!"	April 24, 2018
55	"Exposing past relationships? You want to die together, huh?"	April 25, 2018
56	"Jong Kook met an ex while filming?!"	April 25, 2018
57	"The legendary "BTS" finally comes to Big Picture 2?"	April 30, 2018
58	"Joon Hyung is flawless, even his hair?"	April 30, 2018
59	"Why can't you say "Year of the Red Monkey?""	April 30, 2018
60	"We are the district's Yves Saint Laurent and BTS"	May 1, 2018
61	"Free on Saturdays, reason why HaHa's class dropped!"	May 1, 2018
62	"Osan High School's Legendary Senior, Ha Dong Hoon!"	May 2, 2018
63	"Biggest crisis, HaHa's eat and run(?) controversy!?"	May 2, 2018
64	"Is this for real? Yu Jae Seok is on!"	May 5, 2018
65	"The one who wants to take away vs. keep"	May 5, 2018
66	"The collapse of celebrity, HaHa's struggle to be a model"	May 5, 2018
67	"HaHa's Insignificantly Lucky Day"	May 5, 2018
68	"Desperate people and the battle to stand out"	May 5, 2018
69	"Global Big Picture 2 – We need a fantasy"	May 9, 2018
70	"How to go to the Premier League"	May 9, 2018
71	"Kookie and HaHa's sad trip to England"	May 14, 2018
72	"MADE's first act to go to England"	May 14, 2018
73	"A CEO goes shirtless on Big Picture 2!"	May 14, 2018
74	"A shy confession: What Kookie does every morning"	May 15, 2018
75	"Enters most important Made, Filming studio becomes a mess?"	May 15, 2018
76	"Extreme job, Sadness of the makers of "Big Picture 2""	May 16, 2018
77	"Finally fulfils the fantasy, "Big Picture 2" goes to England!"	May 16, 2018
78	"In Manchester! The forgotten Haha?!"	May 21, 2018
79	"HaHa's 46 hour-trial (a.k.a. The Unlucky icon)"	May 21, 2018
80	"A collaboration between CHO-A-PHARM and Sunmi?"	May 21, 2018
81	"Vice Chairman's Special Decision! Wings of CHO-A-PHARM"	May 22, 2018
82	"Watching Big Match Between Man U and Arsenal"	May 22, 2018
83	"Soccer fans, gather! The fantasy of men comes true!"	May 23, 2018
84	"A single match to pay for dinner"	May 23, 2018
85	"A conglomerate asking Big Picture for help?"	May 28, 2018
86	"No fun except for Haha at Quan Entertainment?"	May 28, 2018
87	"Free-style rap battle in Cheongdam"	May 28, 2018
88	"Legendary arm wrestling match, Jongkook vs. Se Yoon"	May 29, 2018
89	"LGG7 ThinkQ agrees that Moon Se Yoon is an animal"	May 29, 2018
90	"LG G7 ThinQ's amazing AI"	May 30, 2018
91	"Last MADE episode! You did a great job today, again!"	May 30, 2018
92	"Kang Daniel's first title role on Big Picture 3"	June 4, 2018
93	"How to cover production cost – continued"	June 4, 2018
BP 2, emptying the hard drive No. 1	"Trouble maker Haha (a.k.a Misfortune in England)"	June 4, 2018
BP 2, emptying the hard drive No. 2	"JTBC staff visits after their eat and run(?)"	June 4, 2018
BP 2, emptying the hard drive No. 3	"Misfortunate dart bet"	June 5, 2018
BP 2, emptying the hard drive No. 4	"Dried yellow corvina with green tea"	June 6, 2018
Special Ep. 1	"Thank you for 100 million views"	June 6, 2018
Special Ep. 2	"The best features of LG"	June 8, 2018

=== Special season ===
63 Episodes + 8 Surprise Videos

No.	Title	Original release date
1	Exclusive! The start of a project that is more lucrative than a drama	October 8, 2018
2	Big Picture to build a resort!	October 8, 2018
3	Turbulent stories of Park Kwang	October 8, 2018
4	Oceans Six! Professional con men	October 9, 2018
5	Come on to know how to invest in Vietnam	October 9, 2018
6	Variety show war among non-celeb	October 10, 2018
7	Edge around the broadcast censorship rate?	October 10, 2018
Surprise Video 1	Everyone does. Talking about how we are (ft. Copying everyone)	October 12, 2018
8	Kim Jong-kook is different!? (ft. so-called "celebrity disorder")	October 15, 2018
9	Is Jong-kook involved in Cyber Lover since 2000?	October 15, 2018
10	Super Junior's surprise visit to Big Picture?	October 15, 2018
11	Unprecedented project, Big Picture in Vietnam	October 16, 2018
12	It's only possible in Big Picture! Amazing PPL	October 16, 2018
13	Shouting Korea in the enemy's turf	October 17, 2018
14	Countless touching stories about Yoo Jae-suk	October 17, 2018
Surprise Video 2	Cookie video clip: Home shopping?	October 17, 2018
15	TV, This is war	October 22, 2018
16	Let us just watch soccer	October 22, 2018
17	Smaller the Better(?)	October 22, 2018
18	The same kind of celebrity and staff	October 23, 2018
19	Are you a bully? Thumbprint snatched	October 23, 2018
20	Bromance between Smurf and Jong-kook	October 24, 2018
21	Park Gwang, the icon of misfortune	October 24, 2018
Surprise Video 3	Obvious PPL. We love you, advertiser!	October 26, 2018
22	Jong-kook's Transformation	October 29, 2018
23	Find the first investor!	October 29, 2018
24	Rumor on the marriage of Jong-kook and Ji-hyo	October 29, 2018
25	Breath-taking choice	October 30, 2018
26	Jong-kook sings "One Man"	October 30, 2018
27	Bye, Kwang-soo! We have Seungri now!	October 31, 2018
28	Nemesis they bumped into	October 31, 2018
Surprise Video 4	Emergency PPL 2: Essential travel items	November 2, 2018
29	Game of Unfortunate Thrones	November 5, 2018
30	Jong-kook has a wife and a daughter in LA?	November 5, 2018
31	Vung Tau with love!	November 5, 2018
32	Truth about Jong-kook and Angela Kim	November 6, 2018
33	Dating show! Together	November 6, 2018
34	Bad luck caused by Kwang + Roger	November 7, 2018
35	Best way to clear off debts	November 7, 2018
Surprise Video 5	Roger's IN'KLOUZ	November 9, 2018
36	Come back! Humble investment briefing	November 12, 2018
37	What's your name?	November 12, 2018
38	Talks to attract investors	November 12, 2018
39	Numbers to express your heart	November 13, 2018
40	100 million means generous heart	November 13, 2018
41	Jackpot in investment	November 14, 2018
42	Seeing long padded coats in Vietnam?	November 14, 2018
Surprise Video 6	Papa Smurf's hobby is Big Picture?	November 16, 2018
43	Hitting on MOMOLAND!?	November 19, 2018
44	Jong-kook and Haha's DNA?	November 19, 2018
45	Yeodam's makeover!	November 19, 2018
46	How to do business with your friend's money	November 20, 2018
47	401 Resort Dream, Goodbye?	November 20, 2018
48	Meeting with Vietnamese celb Building owners!	November 21, 2018
49	Meeting Vietnamese Lee Sunhee	November 21, 2018
Surprise Video 7	Treasure map they found in Vietnam	November 23, 2018
50	Selling Jong-kook to win over investors?!	November 26, 2018
51	Almost about to win over a new investor.	November 26, 2018
52	Now we have a new office!	November 26, 2018
53	Middle-aged men crying wolf? Put aside the resort and start with bar!? Open 401 Pocha	November 27, 2018
54	SM employee or the rich? The staff should invest too	November 27, 2018
55	Made show comeback to make up production cost!	November 28, 2018
56	Can I find my love? By Mobile Love	November 28, 2018
Surprise Video 8	We're inviting advertisers!	November 30, 2018
57	Strength of manager who controls Jong-kook	December 3, 2018
58	Jong-kook's love needs...Elasticity or money?	December 3, 2018
59	Love needs immunity	December 3, 2018
60	Rebellion of PPL bots? (ft. wanna-be a model)	December 4, 2018
61	CM song for Mmuning, immunity booster	December 4, 2018
62	Found the model for Mmuning?	December 5, 2018
63	Special Season Say Goodbye! Don't say good bye!	December 5, 2018
Surprise Video 8	Farewell to the special season	December 7, 2018

=== Season 3 ===
56 Episodes + 4 Specials

No.	Title	Original release date
1	New Season, New Crew!	April 8, 2019
2	We are not Strangers	April 8, 2019
3	The Weary and Burdened, Come to Big Picture	April 8, 2019
4	IR at Hideout	April 9, 2019
5	We Will Help You to Go Public	April 9, 2019
6	Chaotic IR	April 10, 2019
7	Want Some Crazy Product Placement Ads?	April 10, 2019
Special 1	Crew Casting Started	April 12, 2019
8	Please help me, I keep failing!!	April 15, 2019
9	Concert or an investment briefing?	April 15, 2019
10	Is Kim Jong-kook a mobster?	April 15, 2019
11	Are you ready to rake in money?	April 16, 2019
12	There's lots of zeros! Is this for real?	April 16, 2019
13	Special guest shocked everyone	April 17, 2019
14	Big Picture 3 First Commercial?!	April 17, 2019
Special 2	Behind story of investment briefing	April 19, 2019
15	Hair story that makes you shed tears	April 22, 2019
16	Haircostory made hair?	April 22, 2019
17	Story of season 3's first sponsor! Haircostory's story	April 22, 2019
18	Suffering from hair loss? Come here!	April 23, 2019
19	Let's save HAIRCOSTORY from the crisis	April 23, 2019
20	This is a complete chaos	April 24, 2019
21	The Universe's Greatest Luck is Waiting for You	April 24, 2019
Special 3	Affection Test: What's HAIRCO STORY's product?	
22	Curly hair's transformation	April 29, 2019
23	Let the gentleman pass through	April 29, 2019
24	Wanna fall in love with me?	April 29, 2019
25	Amazing story of HAIRCO STORY	April 30, 2019
26	Queen of Pop Katy Perry's Love Call!	April 30, 2019
27	Open Your Heart 1	May 1, 2019
28	Open Your Heart 2 - XX Brother, Pay Me Back	May 1, 2019
Special 4	Hair Salon After Dance Time	May 3, 2019
