= Zizo (rapper) =

South Korean rapper (born 1986)

Zizo 민주홍
- Born: Min Ju-hong; January 1, 1986 (age 40); Seoul, South Korea
- Genre: Hip hop
- Occupation: Rapper
- Instrument: Vocals
- Years active: 2011–present
- Label: Quan Entertainment

- Zizo
- Hangul: 민주홍
- RR: Min Juhong
- MR: Min Chuhong

Min Ju-hong (Korean: 민주홍, born January 1, 1986), better known by his stage name Zizo (지조), is a South Korean rapper. He was a contestant on Show Me the Money 2. He released his first EP, Nice Service 1/2, on July 1, 2014.

== Discography ==
=== Extended plays ===
Title	Album details	Peak chart positions	Sales
Title	Album details	KOR	Sales
Nice Service 1/2	Released: July 1, 2014; Label: Quan Entertainment, LOEN Entertainment; Formats: CD, digital download	—	—N/a

=== Singles ===
Title	Year	Peak chart positions	Sales (DL)	Album
Title	Year	KOR	Sales (DL)	Album
As lead artist
"Like That"	2013	57	KOR: 36,576	Show Me the Money 2
"Prepared Shooter" (준비된 사수) feat. Red Roc	2013	—	—N/a	Non-album singles
"Winter of Haeundae" (겨울 해운대) feat. Kim Ye-rim	2014	64	KOR: 42,717	Non-album singles
"Spy" feat. Nan Ah-jin	2014	71	KOR: 45,720	Nice Service 1/2
"Run" (달려봐)	2014	—	KOR: 20,204	Nice Service 1/2
"Triple Accel" (트리플 악셀) feat. Skull, Haha	2015	—	—N/a	Non-album singles
"Diving" (다이빙)	2015	—	—N/a	Non-album singles
"Coming Home" (다녀왔습니다) feat. Lee Won-suk	2016	—	—N/a	Non-album singles
"Dymanite Girl" (다이너마이트 소녀)	2017	—	—N/a	Non-album singles
"Heart Racing" (뛴다) feat. Byul	2017	—	—N/a	Hip Hop Teacher OST
Collaborations
"Feel The Tachy Beat" with Leo Kekoa, Paloalto, Ultima, San E	2011	—	—N/a	Non-album singles
"Brilliant Is..." with Skull, Haha, Geeks, Zico, Mad Clown, Swings, Double K, Soul Dive, Heo Kyung-hwan, Kim Ji-min feat. Gill, Jungin	2013	75	—N/a	Non-album singles
"Ta Bom" (따봉) with Larva	2014	—	—N/a	Non-album singles
"What Sub?" with Haha, Ice Puff, H2adin	2017	—	—N/a	Non-album singles
"—" denotes releases that did not chart.
