= Haha (entertainer) =

South Korean entertainer (born 1979)

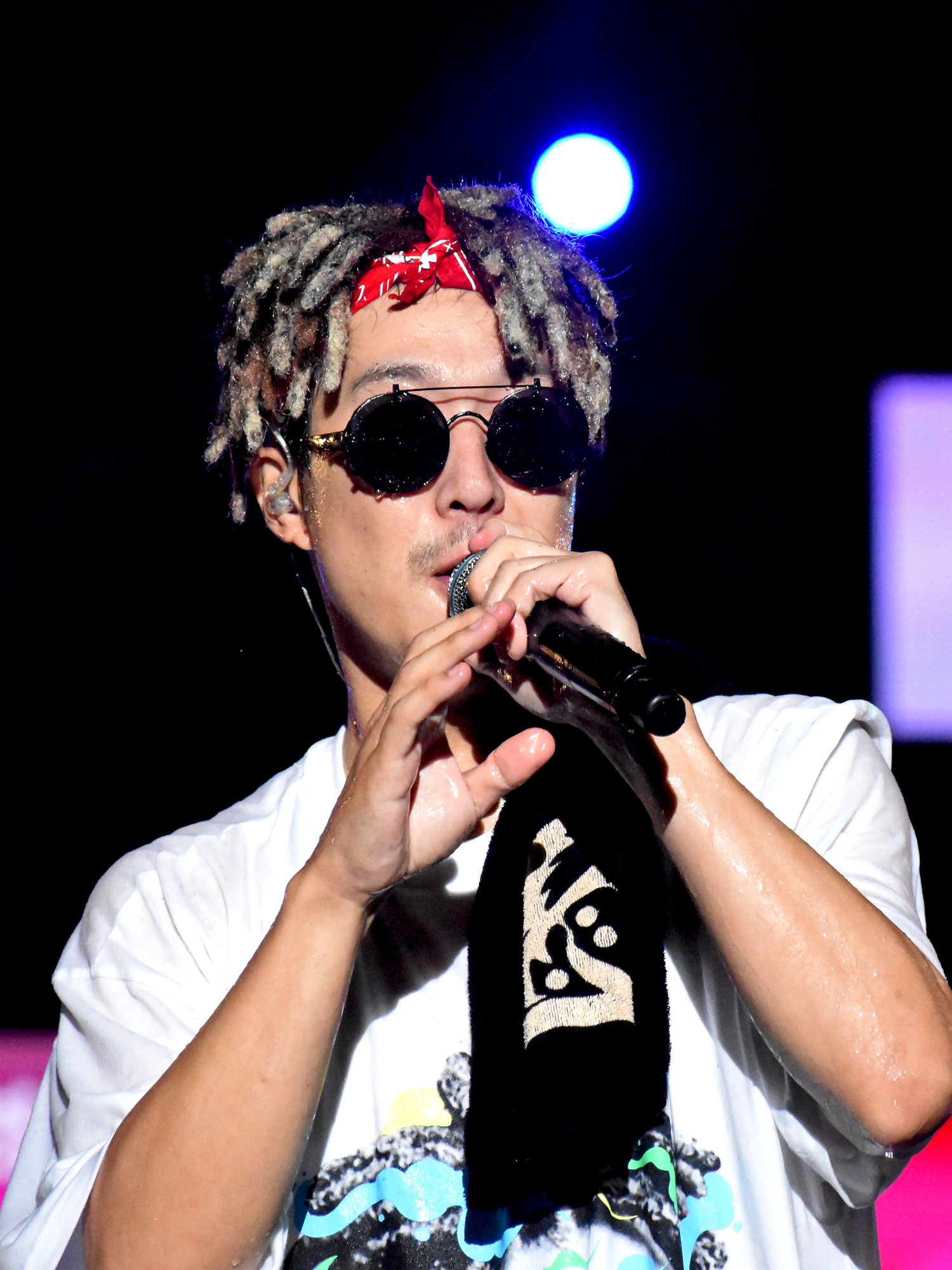
- Haha at the Busan Sea Festival, August 2018
- Born: Ha Dong-hoon; August 20, 1979 (age 47); Stuttgart, Baden-Württemberg, West Germany
- Occupations: Singer; rapper; songwriter; record producer; entertainer; actor; television presenter
- Spouse: Byul (m. 2012)
- Children: 3
- Musical career
- Genres: K-pop; electropop; hip hop; reggae fusion
- Instrument: Vocals
- Years active: 2001 – present 2008 – 2010 (military)
- Labels: Quan Entertainment; Bigfoot Entertainment
- Member of: RGP; Running Man Brothers

Korean name
- Hangul: 하동훈
- Hanja: 河東勳
- RR: Ha Donghun
- MR: Ha Tonghun

Ha Dong-hoon (Korean: 하동훈; born on August 20, 1979), better known by his stage name Haha (하하), is a South Korean singer, rapper, variety show host and member of RGP. He is best known for being in the sitcom, Nonstop and for co-hosting two popular variety programs, MBC's Infinite Challenge and SBS's Running Man. He has also hosted his own show, titled "Ya Man TV" on Mnet in 2015.

== Life and career ==
=== 2000–2008: Debut and rising popularity ===
Haha was born on August 20, 1979, in Stuttgart, Baden-Württemberg, West Germany and moved to Seoul, South Korea when he was an infant. His parents are both Korean. His mother has a doctorate in psychology, and he has older sister, Ha Ju-ri (하쥬리) who is a pianist, and who also has a doctorate. Haha graduated from Daejin University, where he obtained a master's degree in Drama and Fine Arts. He signed to Seoul Records and debuted as a singer and rapper in 2001 with the hip-hop group, Z-kiri. Despite being widely promoted, Z-kiri failed to get popular and quickly disbanded.

In 2002, Haha became a co-host on the show, What's Up YO! alongside MC Mong and Jerome To. The three later became known as the "What's Up Trio" because of their strong friendship on-screen. He then was cast in the third season of Nonstop, a sitcom about a group of college students and their friends and family. He remained a part of the cast until 2003, allowing him to showcase his acting and comedy skills. Haha then became the producer and presenter on his own radio show with MC Mong, known as Haha and Mong's Journey in 2004 for SBS Power FM.

After leaving Nonstop, Haha spent two years alongside singer Taw, to prepare and record his debut album entitled, "The Beautiful Rhyme Diary". The album, and his debut single, "Love Song”, were released together on February 18, 2005, but the single failed to chart or garner much popularity. He guested on X-man on May 22, 2005, and became popular for his imitation of his close friend, Kim Jong-kook. His sudden boost in popularity allowed him to become a regular guest on X-man, arguably the biggest variety show of that time.

Thanks to his growing popularity, Haha joined the cast of MBC's Infinite Challenge by December 2005 as part of some changes to the format of the show pioneered by the new producer, Kim Tae-ho. By the time Season 3 aired in 2006, the concept and format of "variety & reality program" had very popular, and Infinite Challenge was the prototype of many programs that followed. Beginning on December 2, 2006, the program received the highest ratings of prime-time lineups on Saturday evenings. In his final episode before starting military service, Haha performed at a guerilla concert at Yeouido Park that was secretly organized by his fellow co-hosts.

He returned as a guest for the sixth and final season of Nonstop in 2006. In 2007, Haha released his second single, "You're My Destiny" which took samples from the song "Stand by Me" by Ben E. King. The single managed to reach number one on the Gaon Chart and he performed it on the Comeback Stage on Music Bank in November. Haha joined the show, Happy Shares Company as a co-host until February 2008.

=== 2008–present: Military service, Running Man, and career in music ===
In February 2008, Haha temporarily left Infinite Challenge in order to complete his national military service. Reports had claimed that he had been attempting to evade his military service. However it later turned out that these reports weren't true and that Haha's service had only been postponed. During his service, he collaborated with a new group Davichi for their song "Love and War". After serving in the military for 24 months, he was discharged on March 11, 2010.

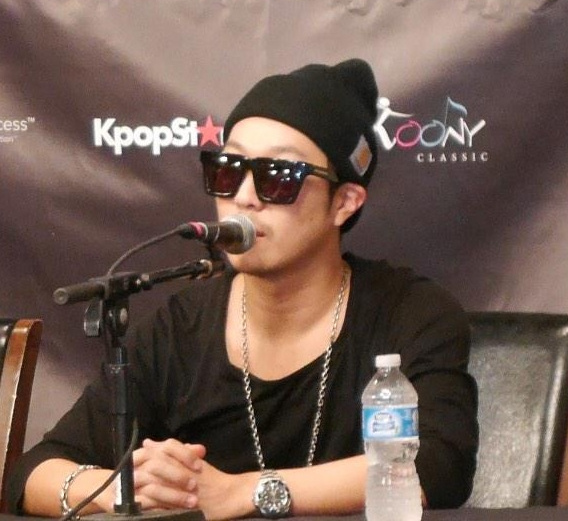
Haha at press conference, Running Man Brothers' US Tour (Dallas, December 14, 2014)

Haha then returned to Infinite Challenge as a cast member following requests from his co-hosts, Yoo Jae-suk and Noh Hong-chul. He also made regular guest appearances on Yoo Jae-suk's talk show Come to Play and was the co-host of the Haha-Mong Show with MC Mong until allegations were made that MC Mong had attempted to evade his military service. Since 2010, Haha has been one of the co-hosts of the SBS variety show, Running Man. On December 30, 2011, he received the award for "Best Entertainer" during the 2011 SBS Entertainment Awards for his work on ''Running Man''. He also performed his single, "Rosa" during the award ceremony.

In 2012, he continued pursuing his musical career by collaborating on a mini-album, "Skull & Haha Ya Man", with fellow reggae artist Skull, who had previously been in Stony Skunk. The two performed one of its tracks, "Busan Vacance" on several TV music shows, and Haha performed the song along with other cast members during fan meets for the Running Man show. In 2012 he was also featured along with Gary, on their fellow Running Man cast member Kim Jong-kook's comeback album, "Volume 7 – Journey Home" on the song "Words I Want to Say to You".

In 2013, Haha collaborated with Skull once again, on a single titled "돈암동 멜로디" as well as on an EP entitled "REGGAErilla". Also, on July 9 of that year, Haha and his wife welcomed their first son, Ha Dream.

In 2014, he and Kim Jong-kook formed a musical duo, Running Man Brothers. They toured the United States in July and December.

In 2016, Haha collaborated with Skull on a single entitled "Love Inside", featuring Stephen Marley. The song ranked in the top ten of a Jamaican video chart when it was released. At that time he had 2 new variety shows: Talking Road and Rebound. In addition, along with Jeong Jun-ha, he hosted a new high school rap battle show on Mnet in 2017.

In 2018, Haha decided to resign as the CEO of Quan Entertainment and his longtime manager, Jang Hyung-chul took over the position.

On December 8, 2021, Haha released his second extended play Gap, the first since Quan Ninomarley A.K.A HaHa Reggae Wave in 2011.

== Personal life ==
On August 15, 2012, it was announced that he was going to marry South Korean singer Byul. The couple married on November 30, 2012. The couple welcomed their first child, Dream, on July 9, 2013. Their second son, Soul, was born on March 22, 2017. Their third child, a daughter, Song, was born on July 15, 2019.

== Filmography ==
=== Film ===
Year	Title	Role	Notes/Ref.
2005	Love in Magic	Park Dong-sun	Supporting role
2006	My Boss, My Teacher	Jin Soo	Supporting role
2006	Who Slept with Her?	Ahn Myeong-seop	Lead role
2006	Holy Daddy	Ha Dong-hoon	Lead role; Credited as Ha Dong-hoon
2007	The Friends	Halibut	Supporting role
2007	Happily N'Ever After	Mambo	Lead role; Korean dub voice-over
2015	MBC Chuseok Movie Special : Begin Again	Dan Mulligan	Lead role; Korean dub voice-over
2016	Life Risking Romance		Cameo
2022	DC League of Super-Pets	Ace / Bat-Hound	Lead role; Korean dub voice-over

=== Television series ===
Year	Title	Role	Notes/Ref.
2002–03	Nonstop	Haha	Lead role; Season 3
2012	Star Life Theatre	Himself	Aired from April 16 to 20
2015	A Girl Who Sees Smells	Himself	Cameo with Running Man members
2015	Temporary Idols	Lee Chan-Hyuk	Cameo as Lee Chan-hyuk of AKMU
2018	Lovely Horribly	Eul-Soon's ex-boyfriend	Cameo (Episode 1)
2021	So Not Worth It	restaurant customer where Jamie works	Cameo (Episode 1)
2023	My Dearest	Farmer	Cameo (episode 12)
2024	My Sweet Mobster	Pharmacist	Cameo (Episode 1)

=== Television host ===
==== Current programs ====
Year	Title	Role	Notes/Ref.
2010–present	Running Man	Co-host	Episode 1–present
2019–present	IconTact	MC	Episode 13–present
2021–present	The Playlist	Main cast	Episode 1–present
2021–present	Hangout with Yoo	Co-host	Episode 102–present
2022–2023	High School Daddy	Host	Season 1–3
2022	Oh Eun-Young Report - Southern Couple	Host	
2022	Pahaha	Cast member	
2023	Haha Bus	Cast member	with family

==== Former programs ====
Year	Title	Role	Notes/Ref.
2002–03	What's up YO!	Co-host	Alongside MC Mong
2005–18	Infinite Challenge	Co-host	December 2005 – March 2008; March 2010 – March 2018
2006–08	Music Bank	Host	Left in February 2008 to serve his national service
2007–08	Happy Shares Company	Co-host	Left in February 2008 to serve his national service
2010	HahaMong Show	Co-host	Alongside MC Mong
2012–13	Haha's 19TV Mutiny	Host	Ended in April 2013
2012–13	Porridge Making Woman, Undying Man	Co-host	Alongside Kim Ok-jung (Haha's Mother); ended in April 2013
2015	Invisible Man	Himself	Episode 1–12
2015	Ya Man TV	Host	Episode 1–24
2015	Law of the Jungle	Member	Episode 175–177 Brunei Hidden Kingdom Special
2015	Battle Trip	contestant	Episode 5–6, along with Hyun Joo-yup and Kim Seung-Hyun
2015	XTM Rebound	Regular player	, formed a team with Kim Seung-Hyun
2016–17	Talk Road	Co-host	Also known as "Talking Road" or "As I Say"; Alongside You Hee-yeol; Episode 1–24; Season 1 ended in March 2017
2017	High School Rapper	Co-host	Alongside Jeong Jun-ha, Episode 1–8
2017	Secret Variety Training Institute	Co-host	Episode 1 (Pilot variety); Alongside Noh Hong-chul
2017–18	Everybody is Dating Except Me	Co-host	Episode 1–12
2018	How Are You.MOV	Co-host	Episode 1–present, Alongside Yoo Se-yoon
2019	Shopping Cart Savior	Cast	Episode 1–4
2019	Earthian Live	Co-host	Episode 1–12
2019	Na Na Land	Co-host	Episode 1–8, alongside DinDin and Lee Yong-jin
2019	We Play	Cast member	Episode 1–12
2019	Music Box	Host	Season 1
2019–2020	Rewind	Team Leader	Episode 1–24
2020	Career Counseling	Host	Ep. 1–4, with Hwang Kwanghee
2020	Most Normal Family	Host	Episode 1–10
2020	Strong Friendship	Cast	Episode 1–10
2020	We Play 2	Cast	Episode 1–12
2021	The Return of Superman	Narrator	Episode 363 –382
2021	Chick High Kick	Cast Member	Episode 1–12
2021	Crazy Recipe Adventure	Main Cast	Episode 1–10
2021	Quizmon	Co-Host	
2022	Riverside Song Festival New Challenge	Host	With Jung Da-hee

=== Web shows ===
Year	Title	Role	Notes	Ref.
2017–19	Big Picture	Cast Member	Alongside Kim Jong Kook	
2018	Royale Adventure	Member	Episode 1–11	
2021	Outrun by running man	Cast Member	Running Man spin-off	
2021–present	Doo-Tap Nom	Host	with Park Myung-soo	
2021–present	Bottom Duo	Host	with Jung Jun-ha	

== Discography ==
=== Studio albums ===
Title	Album details	Peak chart positions
Title	Album details	KOR
The Beautiful Rhyme Diary	Released: February 18, 2005; Label: Pure Entertainment; Formats: CD, digital download	—
Acoustic Tuning Time (with Taw)	Released: March 22, 2012; Rereleased: July 10, 2012; Label: Quan Entertainment; Formats: CD, digital download	35
"—" denotes releases that did not chart or were not released in that region.

=== Extended plays ===
Title	Album details	Peak chart positions
Title	Album details	KOR
Quan Ninomarley A.K.A HaHa Reggae Wave	Released: September 14, 2011; Label: Noah Entertainment; Formats: CD, digital download	19
Gap (공백)	Released: December 8, 2021; Label: Quan Entertainment; Formats: CD, digital download	—
"—" denotes releases that did not chart or were not released in that region.

=== Singles ===
Title	Year	Peak chart positions	Sales	Album
Title	Year	KOR	Sales	Album
"Love Song" (사랑가)	2005	—		The Beautiful Rhyme Diary
"Story of a Short Kid" (키 작은 꼬마 이야기)	2007	—		Infinite Challenge Gangbyeon Road Concert
"You Are My Destiny" (너는 내 운명)	2007	—		Non-album singles
"It's Been 7 Years" (7년만이야) (with Wow, MC Jinri)	2008	—		Non-album singles
"Yes, I Can't Sing" (그래 나 노래 못해)	2008	—		Non-album singles
"Hangover" (술병) (feat. Tiger JK)	2010	13		Non-album singles
"You Are My Destiny 2" (너는 내 운명 2)	2010	23		Non-album singles
"How Are You?? Fine Thank You!!" (하와유?? 파인 땡큐!!) (feat. Skull)	2011	34	KOR: 277,732	Quan Ninomarley A.K.A HaHa Reggae Wave
"Rosa"	2011	47	KOR: 281,610	Quan Ninomarley A.K.A HaHa Reggae Wave
"Pat Pat" (토닥토닥) (feat. Sohyang)	2012	34	KOR: 323,318	Non-album single
"Love" (사랑) (with Taw feat. Gary, Kim Greem)	2012	14	KOR: 517486	Acoustic Tuning Time
"The Person by My Side" (내 품이 좋다던 사람) (with Taw feat. Ha Dong-kyun)	2012	42	KOR: 203,742	Acoustic Tuning Time
"Acacia" (아카시아) (with Taw feat. Sosung)	2012	82	KOR: 48,649	Acoustic Tuning Time
"Sexy Boy" (섹시 보이) (feat. Young Ji)	2013	6		Park Myung-soo's How About This?
"Super Weeds Man" (슈퍼잡초맨) (with Kiha & The Faces)	2013	8		Infinite Challenge Jayu-ro Song Festival
"Brilliant Is..." (with Skull, Geeks, Zico, Mad Clown, Swings, Double K, Zizo, Soul Dive, Heo Kyung-hwan, Kim Ji-min feat. Gill, Jung-in)	2013	75		Non-album single
"$ponsor" (스폰서) (with Zion.T)	2015	3		Infinite Challenge Yeongdong Highway Music Festival
"White" (화이트) (with Oh My Girl feat. M.Tyson)	2016	88	KOR: 25,689	1Love Winter
"Shoot" (쏘아) (with Mino)	2016	3		Infinite Challenge Great Heritage
"What Sub?" (with Zizo, Ice Puff, H2adin)	2017	—		Non-album single
"I Like It" (좋아) (with Running Man cast members)	2019	—		Running Man Fan Meeting: Project Running 9
"Little Taekwon-V Song" (병아리 하이킥 송) (with Dong Hyun Kim, Na Tae-joo, Taemi, Kim Yo-han, UL)	2021	—		Non-album single
"Gap" (공백)	2021	—		Gap
"Ice Bottle" (머리 물 뿌려) (with U-Kwon)	2023	—		Non-album single
"—" denotes releases that did not chart.

== Commercials ==
- 2002: 700–5425
- 2003: OTTOGI CORPORATION 3Minute
- 2003: Binggrae
- 2007: Lotte Card CO., LTD.
- 2008: TriGem Computer Inc.
- 2010: Shinhan Financial Group Co., Ltd.
- 2012: SKY
- 2013: Coca-Cola
- 2013: BRINICLE
- 2014: Coca-Cola
- 2018: K-Fresh Zone (With Lee Kwang-soo)

== Awards and nominations ==
Name of the award ceremony, year presented, category, nominee(s) of the award, and the result of the nomination
Award ceremony	Year	Category	Nominee(s) / Work(s)	Result	Ref.
Innovation Awards	2010	Fifth Category Innovation Award	Haha	Won	
Korea Fashion World Awards	2006	Best Dressed (Broadcast Sector)	Haha	Won	
Korea First Brand Awards	2026	Male Radio DJ	Haha's Super Radio	Won	
MBC Entertainment Awards	2006	Distinguished Male Award	Infinite Challenge	Won	
MBC Entertainment Awards	2006	Excellence Award (Variety)	Infinite Challenge	Won	
MBC Entertainment Awards	2007	Grand Prize	Infinite Challenge	Won	
MBC Entertainment Awards	2014	PD Award	Infinite Challenge	Won	
MBC Entertainment Awards	2015	High Excellence Award (Variety)	Infinite Challenge	Won	
MBC Entertainment Awards	2015	Achievement Award	With Infinite Challenge member	Won	
MBC Entertainment Awards	2021	Best Couple Award	Haha (with Yoo Jae-suk and Mijoo); Hangout with Yoo	Won	
MBC Entertainment Awards	2023	Top Excellence Award (Variety)	Hangout with Yoo	Won	
MBC Entertainment Awards	2023	Popularity Award (Show/Variety)	One Top (with Yoo Jae-suk, Lee Yi-kyung, Joo Woo-jae, Young K and Kim Jong Min); Hangout with Yoo	Won	
MBC Entertainment Awards	2024	Best Couple Award	Haha (with Yoo Jae-suk); Hangout with Yoo	Won	
Mnet 20's Choice Awards	2007	Best DJ Award	Haha	Won	
Mnet Asian Music Awards	2012	Best Collaboration Performance	"Busan Vacance"	Nominated	
National Rowing Championships 2000m Novice	2011	Special Award	Infinite Challenge	Won	
SBS Entertainment Awards	2007	Special Award	Haha	Won	
SBS Entertainment Awards	2011	Best Entertainer Award	Running Man	Won	
SBS Entertainment Awards	2011	Netizen Popularity Award	Running Man	Nominated	
SBS Entertainment Awards	2013	Popularity Award	Running Man	Won	
SBS Entertainment Awards	2013	Excellence Award	Running Man	Won	
SBS Entertainment Awards	2016	Top Excellence Award (Variety)	Running Man	Nominated	
SBS Entertainment Awards	2017	Excellence Award (Variety)	Running Man	Nominated	
SBS Entertainment Awards	2019	Best Entertainer Award	Running Man	Won	
SBS Entertainment Awards	2020	Golden Content Award	With Running Man member	Won	
SBS Entertainment Awards	2020	Top Excellence Award in Show/Variety Category	Running Man	Won	
