= Running Man Brothers =

South Korean pop duo

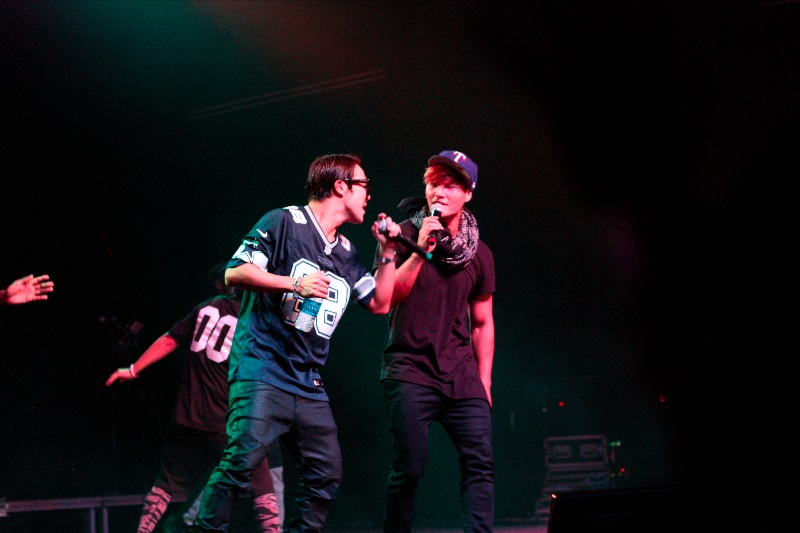
- Running Man Brothers, Haha and Kim Jong-kook in Dallas, December 14, 2014

Background information
- Origin: Seoul, South Korea
- Genres: K-pop, electropop, hip-hop, reggae fusion, Dance, Ballad, Trot
- Years active: 2014–present
- Label: Urban Works
- Members: Kim Jong-kook; Haha

Running Man Brothers is a South Korean pop duo, which is named after the South Korean television show Running Man. The group is composed of cast members Kim Jong-kook and Haha and was formed in 2014.

== History ==
Kim and Haha are regular cast members on the variety show Running Man, which started airing in 2010, and they have been called its favorite "duo." Although Yoo Jae-suk is the star of the show, Kim and Haha have been written of as the "spice" of the show, with references to Kim's "boyish likeability, upbeat personality and masculinity" and Haha for "his insatiable sense of humor and free spirit," and together are called "the musical duo."

The duo's friendship actually pre-dated Running Man, when Kim was better known as one half of the popular dance pop duo Turbo and Haha was just beginning his music career. Both of them were also cast members of the variety show X-Man.

== Career ==
In addition to their individual musical careers, with Haha's "reggae style music" and Kim's "melancholic and soothing ballads," the two have performed together during their work for the Running Man show, at fan meet gatherings and concerts.

Kim's 2012 comeback, break from his hiatus from the music industry album, "Volume 7 - Journey Home" included the track "Words I Want To Say To You" featuring his Running Man members Haha and Leessang's Gary.

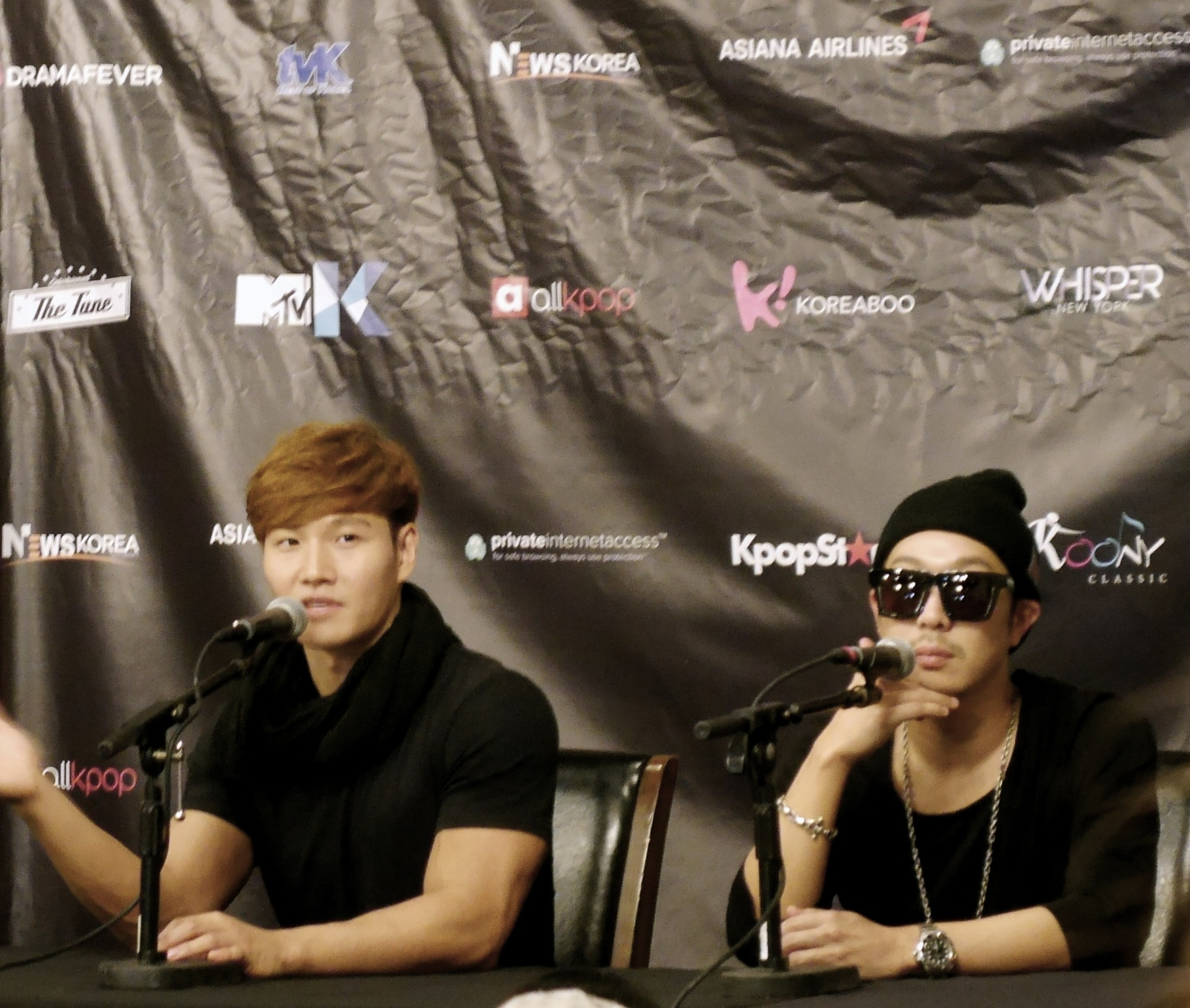
Kim Jong-kook and Haha at press conference, Dallas, December 14, 2014

=== Debut and U.S. tour continued and more ===
On July 12, 2014, the two variety show stars debuted together in concert at the Fantasy Springs Resort, Palm Springs, California, singing their hit songs, which was noted as a "return" to their musical roots.

Again, in December 2014, they collaborated with Tune Entertainment for a second leg of their concert tour in the United States, for concerts on December 12, at Queens College Colden Auditorium, New York City and on December 14, at Gilley's in Dallas. These two concerts, advertised in posters as "2014 Kim Jong Kook and Haha Running Man Bros' US Tour," started off with a video shoutout from Running Man fellow cast members Yoo Jae-suk, Lee Kwang-soo, Ji Suk-jin, Gary, and Song Ji-hyo with their congratulations for the duo's first U.S. tour. The concerts included some of their songs like Haha's "You're My Destiny," Kim's "Lovable," and older hits from Turbo; along with English covers of Bruno Mars's, Just the Way You Are, and Jay-Z and Alicia Keys's Empire State of Mind, to interest the American audience. The two exhibited their Running Man friendship, where they call each other "My Dongsaeng" and "Our Hyung," and showed off their close friendship, "often man-hugging it out to the delight of the concert crowd." The two-hour-long concerts included songs and fan interactions, "pioneered by fluent English (Jongkook) and adorably simplistic English (Haha). In 2019, they announced that they are going to be performing in Malaysia on 2 March."

== Members ==
Member	Joined
Kim Jong-kook	2014-present
Haha	2014-present
