= Rude Paper =

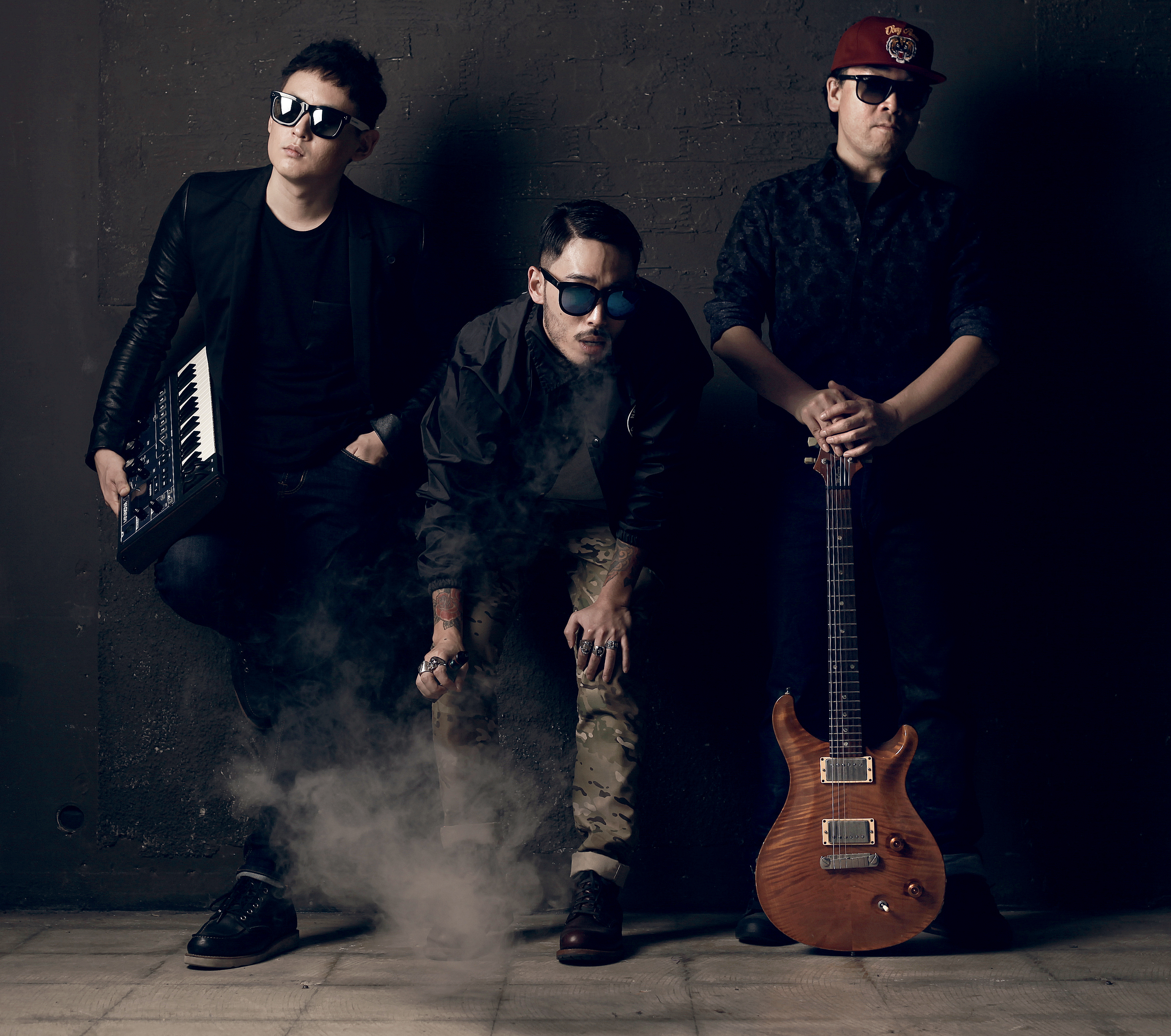
- Members of Rude Paper

Background information
- Origin: South Korea
- Genres: Reggae, Hip-hop, Dubstep
- Years active: 2011–present
- Labels: Giant Hive; Foundation Record; Sony Music Korea; AAP
- Members: Koonta; Real Dreamer
- Website: www.rudepaper.net

Rude Paper (Korean: 루드 페이퍼) is a South Korean collaboration consisting of reggae artist Koonta of Koonta and Nuoliunce and music producer Real Dreamer.

== Biography ==
=== Pre-debut ===
Before coming together, they were already known contributors to the music industry with their respective talents. Koonta is part of the Korean reggae duo Koonta and Nuoliunce and represented the reggae world in Korea alongside Skul1. Real Dreamer is a producer who is known for producing for known music artists like Double K, Outsider and Simon D.

=== Debut and You are not loser ===
On April 26, 2011, they debuted the music video for their title song "Radio" that displayed their unique talent and personalities. They released on September 30 with their new song "You Are Not Loser" and the music video that revealed to be inspirational song about a son walking in the footsteps of his blind father.

=== Realise and collaboration ===
On January 26, Rude Paper released their song Realise showcasing Dubstep and Hip hop blend. They went on to collaborate with Miryo (Brown Eyed Girls) on her first solo album in the song "Revenger".

== Discography ==
| Album Information | Track Listing |
|---|---|
| Radio: Release Date: April 15, 2011; Format: CD, Digital Download; Label: Foundation Record | 1. Radio; 2. Hardcore Boy; 3. All Together Now; 4. Joy; 5. Radio (Remix Version); 6. Joy (Rap Version); 7. Radio (Radio Version) |
| You Are Not Loser: Release Date: September 30, 2011; Format: CD, Digital Download; Label: Foundation Record | 1. You Are Not Loser; 2. You Are Not Loser (Instrumental); 3. You Are Not Loser (Alpha Steppa Remix) |
| Paper Spectrum: Release Date : September 10, 2012; Format : CD, Digital Download; Label: Foundation Record | 1. Radio 2012; 2. Rain drop (Interlude); 3. 비오는 밤에; 4. Don't blame me 5. Who's got the power 6. Mama, I'm home 7. Hand; 8. Freaky high (feat. 미료 of Brown Eyed Girls); 9. 믿지 않아 (feat. Sean2slow); 10. She is smiling (feat. 무웅 of Baechigi); 11. 와다민 (feat. 나오미); 12. Answer (feat. Dok2); 13. You are not a loser (2nd edit); 14. 꿈인걸 알아 (feat. Paloalto); 15. Dream (feat. Kala MC); 16. Realise |

=== Music Videos ===
- "Radio"
- "You Are Not Loser"
- "Hand"
- "비오는 밤에"
