= Byul =

South Korean singer (born 1983)

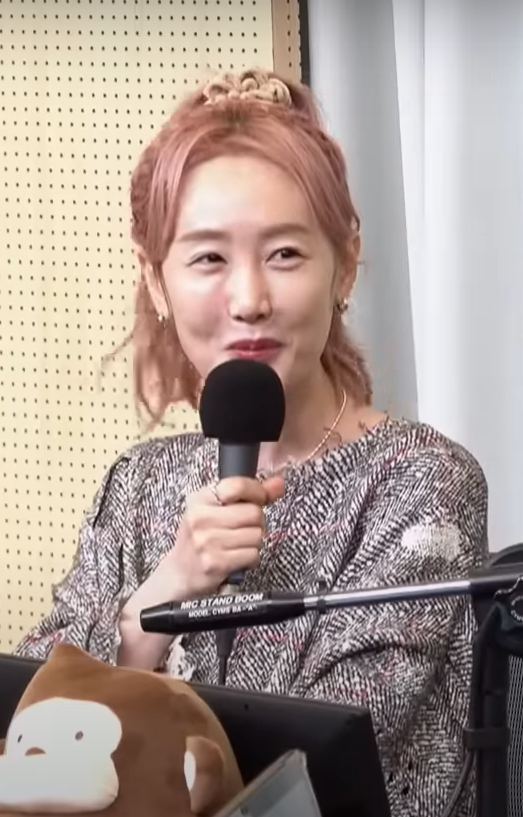
- Byul in January 2023

Background information
- Born: Kim Go-eun; October 22, 1983 (age 42); Eumam-myeon, Seosan, Chungcheongnam-do, South Korea
- Genres: K-pop; ballad
- Occupations: Singer; songwriter
- Years active: 2002–present
- Labels: JYP; H2; Spring; Quan
- Formerly of: M.M.D; JYP Nation
- Spouse: Haha (m. 2012)
- Children: 3

Korean name
- Hangul: 김고은
- RR: Gim Goeun
- MR: Kim Koŭn

Stage name
- Hangul: 별
- RR: Byeol
- MR: Pyŏl

Kim Go-eun (Korean: 김고은; born October 22, 1983), better known by the stage name Byul (Korean: 별; lit. star), is a South Korean singer. She debuted in 2002 with the album December 32.

== Career ==
Her debut album was released on October 10, 2002.

It was announced at the end of January 2009 that Primary, her fifth album, would be released the following month. Teaser posters were distributed in 7-Eleven stores.

== Personal life ==
On August 15, 2012, it was announced that Byul was to marry Haha, South Korean singer, actor and cast member of the variety show Running Man, on November 30, 2012. The couple welcomed their first child, a son named Dream, on July 9, 2013. Their second son, Soul, was born on March 22, 2017. Their third child, a daughter, named Song, was born on July 15, 2019.

== Discography ==
=== Studio albums ===
Title	Album details	Peak chart positions	Sales
Title	Album details	KOR	Sales
December 32 (12월 32일)	Released: October 10, 2002; Label: JYP Entertainment; Formats: CD, cassette; Track listing: 1. 12월 32일 (December 32); 2. 왜 모르니 (Why Don't You Know); 3. 별의 자리 (A Star's Place); 4. 여기까진거죠 (Up to Here?); 5. Don't Leave Me; 6. 바보같이 (Like An Idiot); 7. 얼마나 사랑하는지 (How Much I Love You) (feat. Rain); 8. 마음과 다른 말 (Saying Something Different From What Your Heart Feels); 9. 그가 멀어질 때 (When I Am Further Away From You); 10. 잊을 수 없네요 (I Can't Forget You)	31	KOR: 55,951
Star (별)	Released: March 17, 2005; Label: JYP Entertainment; Formats: CD, cassette; Track listing: 1. 별 (別) (Star); 2. 다른 사람 (Another Person); 3. 안부 (with Na Yoon Kwon); 4. 내 남자의 여자친구 (My Guy's Girlfriend); 5. Saving My Best For You; 6. 이젠 내게 (Now to Me); 7. 나쁜 저주; 8. 2 + 1; 9. 각자의 길 (Our Own Ways); 10. 고마워할게요 (I'll Be Thankful); 11. I Think I 12. I Love You; 13. 나를 봐요 (Look At Me); 14. 끝 (End); 15. 안부 [Instrumental]	15	KOR: 17,306
Fountain of Tears (눈물샘)	Released: May 11, 2006; Label: H2 Entertainment; Formats: CD, cassette; Track listing: 1. 아무렇지 않게 (As Nothing); 2. 눈물샘 (Fountain of Tears); 3. 괜찮은 오늘 (feat. MC Mong); 4. 우린; 5. 슬픈 건망증; 6. 큐피트; 7. Forever Love; 8. 그대라는 사람은; 9. Stay By My Side; 10. 버려야 할 것들; 11. 만나러 가는 길 (feat. Double K); 12. 곁에서만 들리는; 13. 설레임	—	
Her Story	Released: April 25, 2007; Label: H2 Entertainment; Formats: CD; Track listing: 1. 미워도 좋아; 2. 연애의 정석 (feat. TK); 3. 열한번; 4. 물풍선; 5. 세상의 반 (feat. Hoody); 6. 단꿈; 7. Yes I Am; 8. 투정 (feat. Dyna-mic); 9. 잊혀진 것들에 대해서; 10. 서툰 기대; 11. 마음이	9	KOR: 5,483
Like A Star	Released: February 25, 2009; Label: Spring Entertainment; Formats: CD, digital download; Track listing: 1. 6년동안; 2. 행복하자; 3. 드라마를 보면; 4. 안녕; 5. 화풀어줘; 6. 허밍 (feat. Tei); 7. 니가 떠난다 (feat. Park Jang Keun); 8. 울리지마; 9. 비키니; 10. I Love U 11. 말해요; 12. Kiss Day; 13. Hymn	—	
"—" denotes releases that did not chart.

=== Extended plays ===
Title	Album details	Peak chart positions	Sales
Title	Album details	KOR	Sales
Identity	Released: October 27, 2010; Label: Spring Entertainment; Format: CD, digital download	—	
Nostalgia	Released: November 8, 2012; Label: Quan Entertainment; Format: CD, digital download	23	
Leaves	Released: November 5, 2017; Label: Quan Entertainment; Format: CD, digital download	—	
"—" denotes releases that did not chart.

=== Singles ===
Title	Year	Peak chart positions	Album
Title	Year	KOR (Note: The Gaon Music Chart was established in 2010.)	Album
"December 32" (12월 32일)	2002	—	December 32
"Anbu" (안부) (with Na Yoon Kwon)	2005	—	Star
"Fountain of Tears" (눈물샘)	2006	—	Fountain of Tears
"Water Ballon (After December 32) (물풍선 (12월 32일 그 이후))	2006	—	Her Story
"Like You Even Though I Hate You" (미워도 좋아)	2007	—	Her Story
"The Heart Knows" (가슴은 아니까)	2007	—	Star (single album)
"Open the Window" (창문을 열어놓고) (with Na Yoon Kwon)	2008	—	Non-album single
"For 6 Years" (6년동안)	2008	—	Like A Star
"Bikini" (비키니)	2008	—	Like A Star
"When I Watch a Drama" (드라마를 보면)	2009	—	Like A Star
"I Don't Remember" (기억이 안나)	2009	—	Non-album singles
"Sweet Love" (feat. Rhyme Bus)	2010	51	Non-album singles
"It Hurts Today" (오늘 참 아프다)	2010	50	Identity
"Useodo Useodo" (웃어도 웃어도) (with Wasabi Sound)	2011	29	Non-album single
"So Cute" (귀여워) (with Kwon Jung-yeol of 10cm)	2012	2	Nostalgia
"You Are So Bad" (나빠)	2012	19	Nostalgia
"Spring Will Finally Come (Fermata)" (봄이 찾아 오겠죠 (Fermata))	2013	84	Non-album singles
"You Are the Best" (넌 최고야)	2013	22	Non-album singles
"No More Us" (끝난 사이)	2015	31	Non-album singles
"A Shoe" (신발 한 짝)	2015	46	Non-album singles
"Everyday" (매일매일) (feat. Sweet Sorrow)	2015	62	Non-album singles
"Leaves" (feat. Junoflo)	2017	—	Leaves
"Distance" (눈물이 나서)	2018	—	Non-album singles
"Twenty-Two" (스물둘) (with 015B)	2020	—	Non-album singles
"Let's Take Some Time" (헤어져 보자) (with Na Yoon Kwon)	2022	— (Note: "Let's Take Some Time" didn't enter the Gaon Digital Chart, but it peaked at number 22 on the component Gaon Download Chart.)	Non-album singles
"—" denotes releases that did not chart.

=== Soundtrack appearances ===
Title	Year	Peak chart positions	Album
Title	Year	KOR	Album
"I Think I"	2004	—	Full House OST
"If You Love Me" (날 사랑한다면)	2006	—	Invincible Parachute Agent OST
"Heart Is..." (마음이...)	2006	—	Heart Is... OST
"Fly Again"	2007	—	Two Outs in the Ninth Inning OST
"Love You"	2007	—	I Am Sam OST
"Will You Love Me" (사랑할래)	2009	—	He Who Can't Marry OST
"The Woman Who Cut My Guitar Strings" (내 기타줄을 끊은 여자) (with Kim Bum)	2010	—	The Woman Who Still Wants to Marry OST
"After Throwing Away My Heart" (심장을 버린 후에)	2010	—	Cinderella's Stepsister OST
"Binteolteori" (빈털터리) (with Kan Jong-wook)	2010	70	Gloria OST
"Because It's Still You" (그래도 그대니까)	2012	43	Wild Romance OST
"Words Engraved in My Heart" (가슴에 새긴 말)	2012	52	My Husband Got a Family OST
"Before It Touches Both of My Cheeks" (두 뺨에 닿기 전에)	2012	15	Golden Time OST
"Reminds of You" (니 얼굴 떠올라) (feat. Swings)	2012	26	Missing You OST
"Love in Memory"	2013	75	Love in Memory OST
"Remember"	2015	60	Who Are You: School 2015 OST
"Beautiful Days" (아름다운 시절)	2015	—	Second 20s OST
"Dear My Love" (내가 정말 사랑하는 사람이 있죠)	2020	—	When the Weather Is Fine OST
"—" denotes releases that did not chart.

== Filmography ==
- No Money (2021) Host with Lee Ji-hye
- Mama The Idol (2021)
- Jump Like a Witch (2022) Cast Member
- Haha Bus (2023) - with family

== Theater ==
Year	English title	Korean title	Role	Ref.
2023	My Mother	친정엄마	Mi-young	

== Awards and nominations ==
Award	Year	Category	Nominee / nominated work	Result	Ref.
Korea Popular Entertainment Awards	2007	New Generation Top 10 Singer	Byul	Won	
Mnet Music Video Festival	2002	Special Jury Prize	"December 32nd"	Nominated	
SBS Gayo Daejeon	2002	Rookie of the Year	Byul	Won	
