= Zion.T discography =

South Korean hip hop and R&B singer

- Studio albums: 2
- EPs: 4
- Singles: 18

South Korean singer Zion.T has released two studio albums, four extended plays, 18 singles as lead artist, and 11 collaborative singles. He debuted in April 2011 with his self-composed single "Click Me", which features the rapper Dok2.

== Studio albums ==
Title	Album details	Peak chart positions	Sales
Title	Album details	KOR	Sales
Red Light	Released: April 9, 2013; Label: Amoeba Culture; Formats: CD, digital download	4	KOR: 6,314
Zip	Released: December 6, 2023; Label: The Black Label; Formats: CD, digital download	38	KOR: 3,542

== Extended plays ==
Title	Album details	Peak chart positions			Sales
Title	Album details	KOR	US Heat	US World	Sales
Mirrorball	Released: December 19, 2013; Label: Amoeba Culture; Format: Digital download	—	—	—	
OO	Released: February 1, 2017; Label: The Black Label; Formats: CD, digital download	8	24	2	KOR: 3,934
ZZZ	Released: October 15, 2018; Label: The Black Label; Formats: CD, digital download	12	—	12	KOR: 3,464
Poser	Released: August 27, 2025; Label: Standard Friends; Format: LP, digital download	93	—	—	KOR: 992
"—" denotes releases that did not chart.

== Singles ==
=== As lead artist ===
Title	Year	Peak chart positions		Sales	Album
Title	Year	KOR	US World	Sales	Album
"Click Me" (feat. Dok2)	2011	—	—		Red Light
"Two Melodies" (뻔한 멜로디) (feat. Crush)	2013	17	—	KOR: 361,596	Red Light
"Babay" (feat. Gaeko)	2013	9	—	KOR: 509,168	Red Light
"Miss Kim" (미스 김)	2013	25	—	KOR: 104,197	Mirrorball
"Yanghwa Bridge" (양화대교)	2014	1	17	KOR: 2,500,000	Non-album singles
"Zero Gravity" (무중력)	2015	38	—	KOR: 42,016	Non-album singles
"Eat" (꺼내 먹어요)	2015	2	25	KOR: 2,500,000	Non-album singles
"No Make Up"	2015	1	—	KOR: 1,506,283	Non-album singles
"Knock" (쿵)	2016	2	—	KOR: 474,535	Show Me the Money 5
"The Song" (노래)	2017	1	—	KOR: 1,036,924	OO
"Snow" (눈) (feat. Lee Moon-sae)	2017	1	—	KOR: 392,777	Non-album single
"Hello Tutorial" (멋지게 인사하는 법) (feat. Seulgi)	2018	2	—		ZZZ
"May" (5월의 밤)	2019	19	—		Non-album singles
"A Gift!" (선물을 고르며)	2021	99	—		Non-album singles
"Unlove"	2023	134	—		Zip
"V (Peace)" (feat. AKMU)	2023	106	—		Zip
"Love Me"	2025	— (Note: "Love Me" did not enter the Circle Digital Chart, but it peaked at number 59 on the component Download Chart.)	—		Poser
"Heroine"	2025	— (Note: "Heroine" did not enter the Circle Digital Chart, but it peaked at number 104 on the component Download Chart.)	—		Poser
"—" denotes releases that did not chart.

=== Collaborations ===
Title	Year	Peak chart positions	Sales	Album
Title	Year	KOR	Sales	Album
"Just" (그냥) (with Crush)	2015	1	KOR: 1,271,279	Non-album singles
"You And Me" (너와 나) (with Jeon In-kwon, Yoon Mi-rae, Tiger JK, Kang Seung-won, Seoul Electric Band, Galaxy Express, Goonamguayeoridingstella and Grape T)	2015	—		Non-album singles
"$ponsor" (스폰서) (with Haha)	2015	3	KOR: 1,008,809	Infinite Challenge Music Festival
"$insa" (신사) (with C Jamm, Reddy and Xitsuh)	2016	4	KOR: 493,535	Show Me the Money 5
"Machine Gun" (with Kush, feat. Mino)	2016	10	KOR: 339,523	Show Me the Money 5
"Drummer" (드러머) (with Xitsuh, feat. Olltii)	2016	17	KOR: 217,121	Show Me the Money 5
"Confusing" (헷갈려) (with Colde)	2019	92		Yoo-Plash
"Dirty Love" (더럽게) (with Sumin)	2020	—		Non-album singles
"Confirmed" (with E Sens)	2020	—		Non-album singles
"Creamppang" (크림빵) (with Sumin)	2021	—		Non-album singles
"20th Century Peoples" (20세기 사람들) (with Kang Seung-won)	2021	—		Kang Seung-won I-jib
"—" denotes releases that did not chart.

=== As a featured artist ===
Title	Year	Peak chart positions	Sales	Album
Title	Year	KOR	Sales	Album
"She's There" (VidaLoca feat. Beenzino and Zion.T)	2011	—		Non-album single
"Stay Cool" (Simon Dominic feat. Zion.T)	2011	22	KOR: 334,010	Simon Dominic Presents 'SNL League Begins'
"Like a Star" (R-EST feat. Zion.T)	2011	—		T.F.O.N
"I'm Da One" (Jo Kwon feat. Zion.T)	2012	22	KOR: 144,811	I'm Da One
"Blink" (깜빡) (Gray feat. Crucial Star and Zion.T)	2012	—		Non-album single
"Meet" (만나) (Primary feat. Zion.T)	2012	74		Primary and the Messengers
"See Through" (씨스루) (Primary feat. Gaeko and Zion.T)	2012	20	KOR: 2,569,224	Primary and the Messengers
"?" (물음표) (Primary feat. Choiza and Zion.T)	2012	6	KOR: 2,979,462	Primary and the Messengers
"I'm Her" (KittiB feat. Zion.T)	2012	—		Non-album single
"You're Not a Lady" (Jerry.K feat. Zion.T)	2012	—		True Self
"Without You" (니가 없을 때) (Infinite H feat. Zion.T)	2013	31	KOR: 239,371	Fly High
"A Real Lady" (Swings feat. Beenzino, Gray and Zion.T)	2013	9	KOR: 315,639	A Real Lady
"No Make Up" (Gaeko feat. Zion.T and HA:TFELT)	2014	2	KOR: 634,315	REDINGRAY
"Thinking of You" (생각나) (Seo In-young feat. Zion.T)	2014	53	KOR: 84,137	Non-album single
"Déjà-Boo" (데자-부) (Jonghyun feat. Zion.T)	2015	1	KOR: 361,953	Base
"Still On My Way" (Dok2 feat. Zion.T)	2015	76	KOR: 31,517	MULTILLIONAIRE
"247" (일주일) (Junggigo feat. Crush, Zion.T and Dean)	2015	14		Across the Universe
"Eureka" (Zico feat. Zion.T)	2015	1	KOR: 1,179,652	Gallery
"It's Been a While" (오랜만이야) (Loco feat. Zion.T)	2019	17		Hello
"Run" (의 달리기) (Jinbo feat. Joe Wonsun and Zion.T)	2019	—		Non-album singles
"Emergency" (비상사태) (Vince feat. Zion.T)	2020	—		Non-album singles
"No, Thanks" (Jukjae feat. Zion.T)	2020	—		Non-album singles
"Walk in the Night" (밤거리) (Moon Su-jin feat. Zion.T)	2020	—		Non-album singles
"No Bad Dogs" (세상에 나쁜 개는 없다) (Wonstein feat. YDG and Zion.T)	2020	101		Show Me the Money 9
"Credit" (Lil Boi feat. Yumdda, Giriboy and Zion.T)	2020	8		Show Me the Money 9
"Make Love" (나비야) (Gray feat. Zion.T)	2021	150		grayground.
"Merry-Go-Round" (회전목마) (Sokodomo feat. Zion.T and Wonstein)	2021	1		Show Me the Money 10
"A Long Day" (고생이 많아) (Basick, Anandelight, Mudd the Student and Sokodomo feat. Zion.T)	2021	169		Show Me the Money 10
"Anirago" (아니라고) (Slom feat. Zion.T)	2022	—		Weather Report
"Hug" (Lee Young-ji feat. Zion.T and Wonstein)	2022	136		Show Me the Money 11
"Candy" (Jay Park feat. Zion.T)	2023	87		Non-album single
"Amanan" (아마 난) (Fisherman feat. Zion.T)	2024	—		Vanilla
"Her" (그녀) (Sumin and Slom feat. Zion.T)	2025	—		Non-album single
"—" denotes releases that did not chart.

== Soundtrack appearances ==
Title	Year	Peak chart positions	Sales	Album
Title	Year	KOR	Sales	Album
"Kiss Me"	2014	32	KOR: 119,638	Pinocchio OST Part 6
"Those Days" (하루 일과)	2018	89		Prison Playbook OST Part 9
"I Just Want To Stay With You"	2020	139		The King: Eternal Monarch OST Part 1

== Other charted songs ==
Title	Year	Peak chart positions	Sales	Album
Title	Year	KOR	Sales	Album
"She" (feat. Beenzino)	2013	31	KOR: 332,498	Red Light
"Dodohe" (도도해)	2013	54	KOR: 136,798	Red Light
"Doop"	2013	59	KOR: 90,660	Red Light
"O"	2013	72	KOR: 65,438	Red Light
"Global Warming" (지구온난화)	2013	78	KOR: 64,103	Red Light
"Click Me (2013)"	2013	79	KOR: 92,090	Red Light
"Neon"	2013	91	KOR: 53,022	Red Light
"Three Dopeboyz" (쌔끈해) (Dynamic Duo feat. Zion.T)	2013	5	KOR: 407,690	Luckynumbers
"Love It" (너무 좋아) (G-Dragon feat. Zion.T)	2013	20	KOR: 220,460	Coup d'Etat
"Spin Spin"	2013	74	KOR: 49,513	Mirrorball
"Madame"	2013	95	KOR: 31,083	Mirrorball
"I Remember You" (Psy feat. Zion.T)	2015	10	KOR: 316,912	Chiljip Psy-da
"Complex" (feat. G-Dragon)	2017	2	KOR: 600,193	OO
"Sorry" (feat. Beenzino)	2017	5	KOR: 485,860	OO
"Cinema"	2017	11	KOR: 145,986	OO
"Comedian"	2017	19	KOR: 101,878	OO
"The Bad Guys"	2017	22	KOR: 102,227	OO
"Wishes (2015)"	2017	24	KOR: 98,039	OO
"Sleep Talk" (잠꼬대) (feat. Oh Hyuk)	2018	69		ZZZ
"Malla Gang" (말라깽이) (feat. E Sens)	2018	75		ZZZ
"My Luv"	2018	82		ZZZ
"Ideal" (아이돌)	2018	90		ZZZ
"Bench" (with AKMU)	2021	36		Next Episode
