= Counting Stars (Be'O song) =

Single by Be'O
- Language: Korean
- Released: December 12, 2021
- Genre: Hip hop
- Length: 2:30
- Label: FameUs Entertainment; Genie Music; Stone Music Entertainment
- Composers: Be'O; Kevin Jacoutot
- Lyricists: Be'O; Beenzino

Music video
- "Counting Stars" on YouTube

"Counting Stars" is a song by South Korean rapper Be'O featuring Beenzino. It was released on December 12, 2021, through FameUs Entertainment. It was nominated for Hip-Hop Track of the Year at the Korean Hip-Hop Awards and peaked at number one the Gaon Digital Chart.

== Background ==
In October 2021, Be'O appeared on the rap competition TV show Show Me the Money 10 and performed "Counting Stars" in round two. The YouTube video of him singing the song went viral and amassed more than 10 million views. After Beenzino mentioned him and the song on his Instagram live, Be'O contacted him first and asked for a collaboration.

== Music and lyrics ==
According to IZM, the hook singing "Counting Stars!" makes a strong impression. Be'O's trendy vocal captivates listeners and Beenzino's verse showing affection for his stepfather gives an urban vibe.

== Critical reception ==
Professional ratings
Review scores
Source	Rating
IZM	3/5 stars
Music Y	3/5 stars

Lee Hong-hyeon of IZM rated "Counting Stars" 3 out of 5 stars. According to Lee, "although the mixing is causing controversy as it made the cool and clear voice of the performance version muffled and unclear, the song is good because there is no contrived accent nor pitch. It is a song where you can get immersed in the lofi mood comfortably."

Critics of Music Y also rated the song 3 out of 5 stars. According to Kim Seong-hwan, the composition of the hook focusing on metaphors rather than rhymes such as "Counting stars / Pearls in the night sky / Better than your Louis Vuitton" makes listeners feel immersed in it. He concluded that it "shows the strength of the typical Korean popular hip hop."

According to netizen voters of the Korean Hip-hop Awards, it "greatly contributed to the mainstream reception and development of hip-hop" with "Beenzino's feature adding fun and narrative".

== Awards and nominations ==
Award	Year	Category	Result	Ref.
Genie Music Awards	2022	Song of the Year	Nominated	
Korean Hip-hop Awards	2022	Hip-hop Track of the Year	Nominated	
Melon Music Awards	2022	Song of the Year	Nominated	

== Commercial performance ==
"Counting Stars" became the fastest song to reach number one on Melon in 2021. It later peaked at number one on the Gaon Digital Chart and the Gaon Download Chart for two consecutive weeks.

== Charts ==
Chart (2021)	Peak position
South Korea (Gaon)	1
