= Since (rapper) =

South Korean rapper (born 1992)

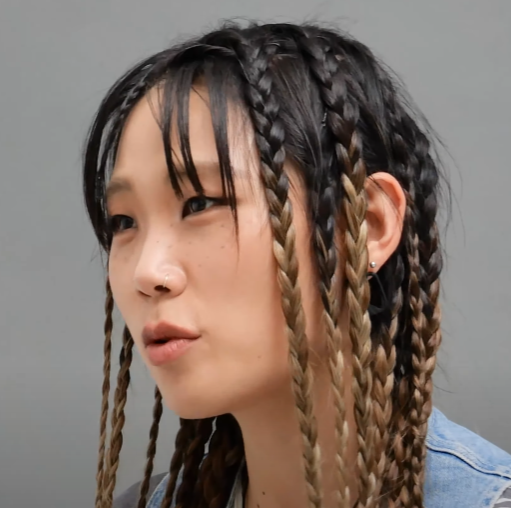
- Since in 2021

Background information
- Born: Shin Su-jin; December 28, 1992 (age 33); Seoul, South Korea
- Genre: Hip hop
- Occupation: Rapper
- Years active: 2020–present

Shin Su-jin (Korean: 신수진; born December 28, 1992), known professionally as Since (신스, stylized in all caps), is a South Korean rapper. She first garnered attention when she appeared on Show Me the Money 10 in 2021. She released her debut studio album Since 16' in the same year which was met with critical acclaim. In 2022, she became the first female musician to win New Artist of the Year at the Korean Hip-hop Awards.

== Early life and education ==
Shin Su-jin was born in Seoul on December 28, 1992. She moved to Daejeon when she was in third grade. She began rapping after she sang along to Eminem's "Lose Yourself" in front of her friends in high school. She decided to be a rapper after applying for Show Me the Money 4 and Show Me the Money 5. In 2016, she moved back to Seoul to pursue her music career. In 2019, she won Open Mic Swg. She adopted the stage name "Since" as it sounds similar to her real name. She also wanted it to mean that the hip hop scene will change since her debut.

She graduated from Chungnam National University with a bachelor's degree in public administration.

== Career ==
In 2020, Since released her debut single "New Shit". In July 2021, she released her debut studio album Since '16 which was met with critical acclaim. Its lead single "Spring Rain" was nominated for Best Rap Song at the Korean Music Awards. In October 2021, she appeared on the rap competition TV show Show Me the Money 10. She became the first female rapper to advance to the finals of the show and finished in second place. In March 2022, she became the first female musician to win New Artist of the Year at the Korean Hip-hop Awards. In August 2022, she released her debut extended play High Risk High Return.

== Artistry ==
Since is known for her powerful raps. She expresses her attitude toward life or experiences through music.

== Discography ==
=== Studio album ===
Title	Details	Peak chart position
Title	Details	KOR
Since 16'	Released: July 16, 2021; Label: Boiling Point Project; Format: CD, digital download	57
The Soloest	Released: November 6, 2023; Label: Go Up Records; Format: CD, digital download	—
"—" denotes releases that did not chart or were not released in that region.

=== EP ===
Title	Details
High Risk High Return	Released: August 17, 2022; Label: Go Up Records; Format: Digital download

=== Singles ===
Title	Year	Peak chart position	Album
Title	Year	KOR	Album
"New Shit"	2020	—	Non-album singles
"Tang" (Feat. Mirani)	2020	—	Non-album singles
"He Said"	2020	—	Non-album singles
"Friday Light"	2020	—	Last 20's
"I Can't Live Without" (담배피러가자구)	2020	—	Last 20's
"29 Love" (29 사랑노래) (Feat. 372)	2020	—	Last 20's
"Hot Sauce" (Feat. 372)	2021	—	Non-album singles
"Go Up" (Feat. Hahoe)	2021	—	Non-album singles
"My Life"	2021	—	Non-album singles
"Wake Up" (with Gaeko, Ourealgoat, Ahn Byeong-woong, Tabber and Jo Gwang-il)	2021	3	Show Me the Money 10
"Reset" (with Tabber featuring Gaeko and Kid Milli)	2021	17	Show Me the Money 10
"Face Time" (featuring Giriboy, pH-1 and Gaeko)	2021	47	Show Me the Money 10
"Up" (UP해) (featuring Jay Park and Woo Won-jae)	2021	45	Show Me the Money 10
"Sign" (featuring Mirani)	2021	69	Show Me the Money 10
"B.O.T.B." (with Gaeko, Changmo, Don Mills, Los, DeVita, Sole and Be'O)	2021	—	Non-album singles
"Whistle" (휘파람)	2022	—	Non-album singles
"20"	2022	—	Non-album singles
"We Here" (with Hahoe and Bona Zoe)	2022	—	Non-album singles
"Next Year" (다음해)	2022	—	Non-album singles
"Don't Say Anything" (아무말도)	2022	—	Non-album singles
"Smash"	2023	—	Non-album singles
"Swallow" (삼켜) (with Bryn)	2023	—	Non-album singles
"Flip Flop" (with Gummy)	2025	—	World of Street Woman Fighter
"—" denotes releases that did not chart or were not released in that region.

== Filmography ==
=== TV ===
Year	Title	Role	Ref.
2020	Show Me the Money 9	Contestant	
2021	Show Me the Money 10	Contestant (Runner-up)	

== Awards and nominations ==
Award	Year	Nominee	Category	Result	Ref.
Korean Music Awards	2022	Herself	Rookie of the Year	Nominated	
Korean Music Awards	2022	"Spring Rain"	Best Rap Song	Nominated	
Korean Hip-hop Awards	2022	Herself	New Artist of the Year	Won	
