= Sumin (musician) =

South Korean record producer

Sumin 수민
- Born: Park Su-min (박수민)
- Genres: Hip-Hop, R&B, Soul
- Occupations: Musical producer; lyricist; singer
- Years active: 2015–present

Park Su-min, known professionally as Sumin (Korean: 수민) is a South Korean singer-songwriter and record producer. She first came to prominence with the single "곤란한 노래" (The Gonlan Song), one of the tracks on her Miniseries collaboration album with fellow producer Slom. The song earned the duo the Korean Music Award for Best R&B and Soul Song.

== Career ==
In December 2015, Sumin debuted with the single "뜨거워질거야"; the next year, she released the mini album Beat, And Go To Sleep. Her first studio album, Your Home, was named "one of the best albums of 2018" by the webzine Weiv. Sumin has produced music for BTS, Red Velvet, BoA, and more.

== Discography ==
=== Studio albums ===
Title	Album details	Peak chart positions	Sales
Title	Album details	KOR	Sales
Your Home	Released: August 10, 2018; Label: Sumin	—	
Miniseries (with Slom)	Released: September 15, 2021; Label: EMA Recordings	—	
Miniseries 2 (with Slom)	Released: July 18, 2024; Label: Standard Friends	71	KOR: 3,663
dinnermode	Released: August 13, 2026; Label: Standard Friends	—	
"—" denotes releases that did not chart or were not released in that region.

=== Extended plays ===
Title	Album details
Beat, and Go to Sleep	Released: February 25, 2016; Label: Luv Jones Records
Sparkling	Released: June 11, 2017; Label: Luv Jones Records
CLUB 33 (with Kirin)	Released: December 10, 2018; Label: 8BallTown
OO DA DA	Released: July 19, 2019; Label: Mother
XX,	Released: June 23, 2020; Label: Mother
Sichimi (시치미)	Released: November 7, 2023; Label: Sumin
Miniseries: Remixes (with Slom)	Released: February 11, 2025; Label: Standard Friends

=== Singles ===
==== As lead artist ====
Title	Year	Album
"Tteugeowojilgeoya" (뜨거워질거야) (feat. Soulman)	2015	Beat, and Go to Sleep
"Just Say You Hate Me" (내가 싫어졌다고 해)	2016	Beat, and Go to Sleep
"U & Me" (feat. Jinbo)	2016	Non-album single
"Sparkling"	2017	Sparkling
"Mirrorball"	2017	Your Home
"Sugar Fountain" (설탕분수)	2018	Your Home
"Your Home" (너네 집) (feat. Xin Seha)	2018	Your Home
"Shaker"	2019	OO DA DA
"Love Is Strange" (사랑이란 묘한거야) (feat. Qim Isle)	2019	Non-album single
"TURNON" (불켜)	2020	XX,
"ZAZA♡" (사랑만들기)	2020	XX,
"Fightman" (feat. Sokodomo)	2021	Non-album singles
"Drawer" (서랍)	2022	Non-album singles
"Best Friend" (feat. Woo)	2023	Non-album singles
"Closet" (옷장) (feat. Uhm Jung-hwa)	2023	Sichimi
"Human Theater" (인간극장) (feat. Sunwoo Jung-a)	2023	Sichimi

==== Collaborations ====
Title	Year	Album
"On & On" (오 내 노래) (with Kirin)	2018	CLUB 33
"Dirty Love" (더럽게) (with Zion.T)	2020	Non-album singles
"Dreams Come True" (with Kirin, feat. Golden, Jay Park)	2020	Non-album singles
"Take Care" (아껴줄게) (with L-Like)	2020	Non-album singles
"Automatic Remix" (with various artists)	2020	Non-album singles
"Creamppang" (크림빵) (with Zion.T)	2021	Non-album singles
"The Gonlan Song" (곤란한 노래) (with Slom)	2021	Miniseries
"Let It Snow" (with pH-1)	2023	Non-album singles
"Roller Coaster" (with Sirup)	2024	Non-album singles
"Stoplight" (신호등) (with Slom)	2024	Miniseries 2
"Why, Why, Why" (왜, 왜, 왜) (with Slom)	2024	Miniseries 2
"Goodbye" (진짜 안녕) (with Slom)	2024	Miniseries 2
"The Gonlan Song" (Japanese version) (with Slom)	2025	Non-album singles
"City View" (with Slom)	2025	Non-album singles
"Her" (그녀) (with Slom, feat. Zion.T)	2025	Non-album singles
