= 2022 Genie Music Awards =

South Korean music award ceremony

- Date: November 8, 2022
- Location: Namdong Gymnasium, Incheon, South Korea
- Most awards: Lim Young-woong (3)
- Most nominations: (G)I-dle (6)
- Website: Official website

Television/radio coverage
- Network: ENA; Idol Plus; STAYG; Abema (Japan)

The 2022 Genie Music Awards took place on November 8, 2022, at the Namdong Gymnasium in Incheon, South Korea. Organized by Genie Music, the event returned after a one-year hiatus and was the first offline edition since 2019. Artists who released music between October 1, 2021, and October 5, 2022, were eligible for nominations.

Following the Itaewon stampede incident, the organizers canceled the red carpet and live broadcast as a mark of respect. Instead, the event was pre-recorded and later made available on VOD platforms on November 18, 2022.

== Judging criteria ==
Division	Online Voting	Digital Sales	Judge Score
Singer of the Year	—N/a	60%	40%
Song of the Year	—N/a	60%	40%
Album of the Year	—N/a	60%	40%
Artist Category Awards*	20%	50%	30%
Performance Category Awards**	20%	30%	50%
Special Awards***	100%	—N/a	
*Best Male Solo Artist, Best Female Solo Artist, Best Male Group, Best Female Group, Best Male Rookie Award, Best Female Rookie Award; **Best Male Performance Award, Best Female Performance Award; ***Genie Music Popularity Award, Idol Plus Global Popularity Award

== Winners and nominees ==
Winners are highlighted in bold. The following nomination lists were made available on October 6.

Song of the Year (Daesang)	Album of the Year (Daesang)
**Lim Young-woong – "Our Blues, Our Life"**; Big Bang – "Still Life"; Big Naughty – "Beyond Love" (feat. 10cm); Kim Min-seok – "Drunken Confession"; Be'O – "Counting Stars"; Red Velvet – "Feel My Rhythm"; Ive – "Love Dive"; IU – "Strawberry Moon"; Psy – "That That" (feat. Suga); (G)I-dle – "Tomboy"	**NCT Dream – Glitch Mode**; Psy – Psy 9th; Blackpink – Born Pink; (G)I-dle – I Never Die; Lim Young-woong – Im Hero; Taeyeon – INVU; Kim Ho-joong – Panorama; BTS – Proof; Seventeen – Face the Sun; Red Velvet – The ReVe Festival 2022 – Feel My Rhythm
Singer of the Year (Daesang)	Genie Music Popularity Award
**NCT Dream**; Kim Ho-joong; Seventeen; Psy; IU; Lee Chan-won; Lim Young-woong; Taeyeon; Ive; (G)I-dle	**Lim Young-woong**; Be'O; (G)I-dle; IU; Ive; Kim Ho-joong; Lee Chan-won; NCT Dream; Psy; Seventeen; Taeyeon; BTS
Best Male Group	Best Female Group
**BTS**; Big Bang; NCT Dream; Seventeen; Stray Kids	**(G)I-dle**; Aespa; Blackpink; Ive; Red Velvet
Best Male Solo Artist	Best Female Solo Artist
**Lim Young-woong**; Kim Ho-joong; Psy; Be'O; Lee Chan-won	**Taeyeon**; IU; Nayeon; Choi Ye-na; Kassy
Best Male Rookie Award	Best Female Rookie Award
**Tempest**; ATBO; TNX; Xdinary Heroes; Younite	**Ive**; Le Sserafim; NewJeans; Nmixx; Kep1er
Best Male Performance Award	Best Female Performance Award
**The Boyz**; Enhypen; NCT Dream; Seventeen; Stray Kids	**Red Velvet**; Aespa; Blackpink; (G)I-dle; Twice
Best Hip Hop Artist	Best Rock Artist
**Be'O**	**Jaurim**
Best Pop Artist	Best Music Video
**Peder Elias**	**Red Velvet - "Feel My Rhythm"**

=== Other awards ===
- IdolPlus Global Popularity Award – BTS
- Best Record – (G)I-dle – "Tomboy"
- Best Style - Ive
- Next Generation – DKZ
- Next Generation Global – PSYCHIC FEVER
- Next Wave Icon - Lightsum, TNX
