= Miniseries (album) =

Studio album by Sumin & Slom
- Released: September 15, 2021
- Genre: Hip hop, R&B, electronic, Shibuya-kei
- Length: 31:13
- Label: EMA

Miniseries is a collaborative studio album by South Korean singer-songwriter Sumin and record producer Slom. It was released on September 15, 2021, through EMA Recordings. It was later nominated for Best R&B Album at the Korean Music Awards.

== Background ==
Sumin and Slom wrote "Mirage" in 2017 and worked on the other songs until May 2020. The album was made through crowd funding on Tumblbug.

== Music and lyrics ==
Using the concept of miniseries, the album captures "various moments of love and subtle emotions". The first half makes you feel that the relationship is going well while the second half hints that it is not working anymore. In terms of music, Slom's production encompasses not only subgenres of hip hop and R&B but also electronic and Shibuya-kei.

"Mirage" is a neo soul song about trying to catch a disappearing love interest. "The Gonlan Song" is a g-funk track that depicts a bold but somewhat clumsy woman. "Yogijogi" borrows from electro house sounds while "What Do You Think" is an uptempo dance number. "Broken" and "For Now" depicts lovers bored with each other. "Cheers" is a minimal UK garage track where Sumin sings about thinking about her lover even at friend gatherings.

== Critical reception ==
Hwang Du-ha of Rhythmer rated the album 4 out of 5 stars. He called it a "work that allows you to fully enjoy the present of the artist at the forefront of the Korean black music scene." Jang Jun-hwan of IZM rated the album 3.5 out of 5 stars. He called it "the moment when the standard of a 'well-made alternative R&B album' is created."

Critics of Music Y rated "The Gonlan Song" 3.5 out of 5 stars. Yeolsimhi called it "a masterpiece which is a combination of outstanding skills, mutual understanding between artists, and clear direction".

=== Year-end list ===
| Publication | List | Rank | Ref. |
|---|---|---|---|
| Rhythmer | 10 Best Korean R&B Albums of 2021 | 5 | |

== Awards and nominations ==
| Award | Year | Category | Result | Ref. |
|---|---|---|---|---|
| Korean Music Awards | 2022 | Best R&B Album | Nominated | |
| Korean Hip-hop Awards | 2022 | R&B Album of the Year | Nominated | |

== Track listing ==
All lyrics are written by Sumin; all music is composed by Slom, Sumin.

| No. | Title | Length |
|---|---|---|
| 1. | "Mirage" (신기루) | 3:14 |
| 2. | "In Touch" (맞닿음) | 3:25 |
| 3. | "The Gonlan Song" (곤란한 노래) | 2:52 |
| 4. | "Yogijogi" (여기저기) | 3:27 |
| 5. | "What Do You Think" (어떻게 될 것 같애) | 3:19 |
| 6. | "Oo" (ㅜ) | 2:48 |
| 7. | "Broken" (망가진 사이) | 2:46 |
| 8. | "For Now" (일단은) | 3:05 |
| 9. | "Trap" | 3:00 |
| 10. | "Cheers" (한잔의 추억) | 3:12 |
| Total length: | | 31:13 |

CD & Vinyl bonus track
| No. | Title | Length |
|---|---|---|
| 11. | "COMPLAINT (불만사항)" | 3:50 |
| 12. | "NORÉBANG (노래방)" | 1:54 |
| Total length: | | 36:57 |
