= Genie Music Awards =

South Korean music awards ceremony

- Previous: 2022 Genie Music Awards; November 8, 2022
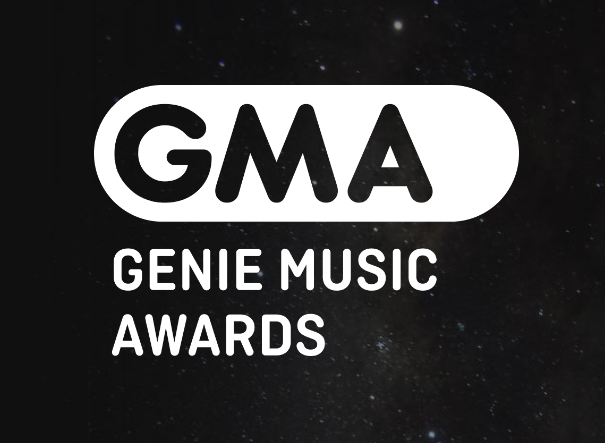
- Official logo
- Native name: 지니뮤직어워드
- Awarded for: Excellence in music
- Country: South Korea
- Presented by: Genie Music; MBC Plus (2018); M2 (2019); ENA (2022)
- First award: November 6, 2018; 8 years ago

The Genie Music Awards (Korean: 지니뮤직어워드) is a music awards show that is held annually in South Korea and organized by Genie Music together with their partner network. The award winners are selected based on chart data from the Genie Music platform, evaluation from judges, and online voting in South Korea.

== Ceremonies ==
Year	Date	Venue	City	Ref.
1st	November 6, 2018	Namdong Gymnasium	Incheon	
2nd	August 1, 2019	Olympic Gymnastics Arena	Seoul	
3rd	December 1, 2020	Online		
4th	November 8, 2022	Namdong Gymnasium	Incheon	

== Daesang Awards (Grand Prizes) ==
=== The Top Artist (Note: before: Best Artist of the Year (2018) / "Artist of the Year" (2020)) ===
Year	Winner
2018	BTS
2019	BTS
2020	Lim Young-woong
2022	NCT Dream

=== The Top Music (Note: before: "Best Song of the Year" (2018) / "Song of the Year" (2020)) ===
Year	Winner	Song
2018	Wanna One	"Beautiful"
2019	Paul Kim	"Me After You"
2020	Zico	"Any Song"
2022	Lim Young-woong	"Our Blues, Our Life"

=== The Top Album (Note: before "Best Digital Album of the Year" (2018), "Album of the Year" (2020)) ===
Year	Winner	Album
2018	BTS	Love Yourself: Answer
2020	BTS	Map of the Soul: 7
2022	NCT Dream	Glitch Mode

== Artist Category Awards ==
=== The Group Award (Note: before "Best Female / Male Group" (2018)) ===
Year	Winners	
Year	Male	Female
2018	BTS	Twice
2019	BTS	Twice
2022	BTS	(G)I-dle

=== The Solo Artist Award (Note: before "Best Female / Male Artist" (2018)) ===
Year	Winners	
Year	Male	Female
2018	Jung Seung-hwan	Chungha
2019	Paul Kim	Chungha
2022	Lim Young-woong	Taeyeon

=== The New Artist Award (Note: before "Best New Female / Male Artist" (2018)) ===
Year	Winners	
Year	Male	Female
2018	Stray Kids	(G)I-dle
2019	Tomorrow X Together	Itzy
2022	Tempest	Ive

== Genre-specific Awards ==
=== The Performing Artist (Note: before: "Best Dance Performance" (2018) / "Best Dance Track" (2020)) ===
Year	Winner		Song
2018	Male	BTS	"Idol"
2018	Female	Momoland	"Bboom Bboom"
2019	Male	BTS	"Boy With Luv"
2019	Female	Iz*One	"Violeta"
2020	Overall	BTS	"Dynamite"
2022	Male	The Boyz	"Whisper"
2022	Female	Red Velvet	"Feel My Rhythm"

=== Best Ballad Track ===
Year	Winner	Song
2020	M.C The Max	"Bloom"

=== Best R&B/Soul Track ===
Year	Winner	Song
2020	Lee Hi	"Holo"

=== Best Hip Hop Artist (Note: before: "Best Rap/Hip Hop Track" (2018, 2020)) ===
Year	Winner	Song
2018	iKon	"Love Scenario"
2020	Zico	"Any Song"
2022	Be'O	"Counting Stars (featuring Beenzino)"

=== Best Trot Track ===
Year	Winner	Song
2020	Lim Young-woong	"Trust in Me"

=== Best Rock Artist ===
Year	Winner
2022	Jaurim

== Best OST Award ==
Year	Winner	Song	Drama
2018	Paul Kim	"Every Day, Every Moment"	Should We Kiss First?
2020	Jo Jung-suk	"Aloha"	Hospital Playlist

== Popularity Awards ==
=== Genie Music Popularity Award ===
Year	Winner
2018	BTS
2019	BTS
2022	Lim Young-woong

=== Global Popularity Award ===
Year	Winner
2018	BTS
2019	BTS
2022	BTS

== Other Awards ==
=== Best Music Video ===
Year	Winner
2018	BTS
2022	Red Velvet

=== Best Pop Artist ===
Year	Winner
2018	Charlie Puth
2022	Peder Elias

=== Best Record ===
Year	Winner
2022	(G)I-dle

== Special awards ==
=== Best Style Award ===
Year	Winner
2018	BTS
2022	Ive

=== Next Generation ===
Year	Winner
2022	DKZ

=== Next Generation Global ===
Year	Winner
2022	Psychic Fever

=== Next Wave Icon ===
Year	Winners	
Year	Male	Female
2022	TNX	Lightsum

== Discontinued Awards ==
See Awards

The Top Best Selling Artist (Note: "Grand Prize")

Year	Winner
2018	Twice
2019	Twice

M2 Top Video (Note: "Grand Prize")

Year	Winner
2019	BTS

Best Producer

Year	Winner
2018	Bang Si-hyuk

Best Choreography

Year	Winner	Work
2018	Son Sung-deuk	BTS – "Idol"

Best Fandom

Year	Winner
2018	A.R.M.Y (BTS Fandom)

The Innovator

Year	Winner
2019	Yoon Jong Shin

The Performance Creator

Year	Winner
2019	Lia Kim

The Vocal Artist (Note: before: "Best Vocal Performance"(2018))

Year	Winner		Song
2018	Male	Wanna One	"Beautiful"
2018	Female	Heize	"Jenga"
2019		Mamamoo	"Gogobebe"

Best Band Performance

Year	Winner	Song
2018	Day6	"Shoot Me"
2019	Day6	"Time of Our Life"

MBC Plus Star Award

Year	Winners
2018	Wanna One

M2 Hot Star

Year	Winners
2019	Pentagon
2019	Cosmic Girls

Next Generation Star

Year	Winners
2019	AB6IX
2019	Kim Jae-hwan

Best Global Performance

Year	Winner
2018	Twice

M2 The Most Popular Artist

Year	Winner
2019	Iz*One

Discovery of the Year

Year	Winner
2018	Celeb Five

== Most Wins ==
Rank	Artist(s)	Awards
1	BTS	19
2	Lim Young-woong	5
2	Twice	5
