= Be'O =

South Korean rapper (born 2000)

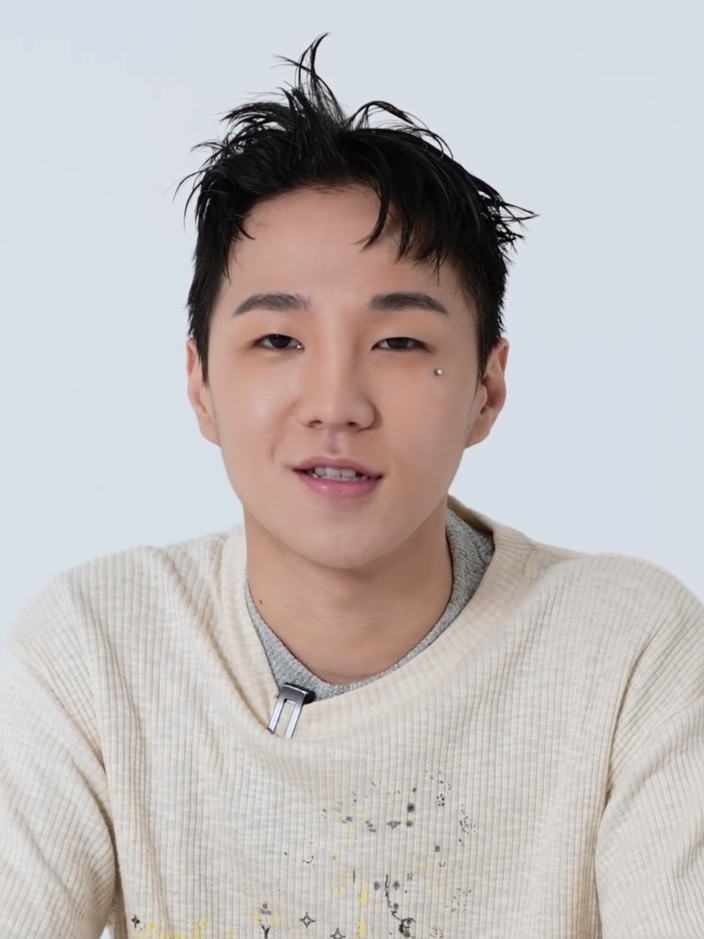
- Be'O in 2021

Background information
- Born: Yoo Chan-wook; April 27, 2000 (age 25); Jongno District, Seoul, South Korea
- Genres: Hip hop
- Occupations: Rapper; songwriter
- Years active: 2020–present
- Labels: FameUs; BPM

Yoo Chan-wook (Korean: 유찬욱; born April 27, 2000), known professionally as Be'O (Korean: 비오; stylized in all caps), is a South Korean rapper and songwriter. He first garnered attention when he appeared on the rap competition TV show Show Me the Money 10 in 2021.

Be'O signed to hip hop record label FameUs Entertainment in 2020 where he released the single albums Monster (2020) and Bipolar (2021). In 2021, he released the single "Counting Stars", which peaked at number one on the Gaon Digital Chart.

== Early life and education ==
Yoo Chan-wook was born on April 27, 2000, in Jongno District, Seoul, South Korea. He became interested in hip hop after watching Show Me the Money 3. When he was in the third grade of middle school, he decided to pursue a career in music. He graduated from School of Performing Arts Seoul and took part in season 3 of High School Rapper.

He adopted the stage name "Be'O" from his Christian name Pio.

== Career ==
=== 2020–2021: Signing to FameUs Entertainment and Show Me the Money 10 ===
In early 2020, Be'O signed to FameUs Entertainment, a hip hop label founded by rapper San E. He released the compilation albums God FameUs and Famous FameUs with labelmates San E, Errday, and Malkey in April and August respectively. In September 2020, he released his debut single Monster.

In May 2021, he released the single Bipolar. In October 2021, he appeared on the rap competition TV show Show Me the Money 10 where he gained popularity. "Breathe" and "Limousine", the singles he released on the show, both peaked at number 1 on the Gaon Digital Chart. He also released the singles "MBTI", "Without You", and "Nothing" and finished in third place. In December 2021, he released the single "Counting Stars" featuring rapper Beenzino, which peaked at number 1 on the Gaon Digital Chart.

=== 2022–present: Signing to BPM Entertainment, Five Senses and Affection ===
On March 8, 2022, it was announced that Be'O will be co-managed by FameUs and BPM Entertainment. In the same month, he became the brand ambassador of Kappa. He released his debut extended play Five Senses on September 29, 2022.

In April 2024, Be'O announced that he will release his second extended play Affection on April 24.

== Artistry ==
Be'O pursues "music that makes people who do not know me at all imagine me". In an interview with The Single, he said that the live performance of "Stay" by Justin Bieber and The Kid Laroi always gives him inspiration.

== Discography ==
=== Extended plays ===
Title	EP details	Peak chart positions	Sales
Title	EP details	KOR	Sales
Five Senses	Released: September 29, 2022; Label: FameUs, BPM; Formats: CD, digital download, streaming; Track listing: 1. "Brunch" (feat. Wonstein, Sion); 2. "Rope" (줄) (feat. Kwon Jin-ah); 3. "Complex" (자격지심) (feat. Zico); 4. "Bbi Yong" (feat. Loco, Gray); 5. "Nostalgia"; 6. "Burnout Syndrome"; 7. "Love Me Remix" (feat. Ash Island)	29	KOR: 5,874
Affection	Released: April 24, 2024; Label: FameUs, BPM; Formats: CD, digital download, streaming; Track listing: 1. "Priority" (우선순위); 2. "Coincidence" (우연) (feat. Kim Feel Sun); 3. "Selfish" (feat. Bang Ye-dam); 4. "Lavender" (feat. Paul Blanco); 5. "All Night" (밤새); 6. "Universe" (우주) (feat. Big Naughty); 7. "Sorry"	39	KOR: 2,705

=== Compilation albums ===
Title	Album details
God FameUs (with San E, Errday, Malkey)	Released: April 9, 2020; Labels: FameUs Entertainment, Warner Music Group; Formats: Digital download
Famous FameUs (with San E, Errday, Malkey)	Released: August 26, 2020; Labels: FameUs Entertainment, Warner Music Group; Formats: Digital download

=== Singles ===
==== As lead artist ====
List of singles as lead artist, showing year released, selected chart positions, and name of the album
Title	Year	Peak chart positions		Album
Title	Year	KOR	KOR Billb. (Note: Includes the Billboard K-pop Hot 100 (defunct as of 2022), and South Korea Songs (part of Billboard's Hits of the World (2022 onwards)).)	Album
"That's Wolf"	2020	—	—	Monster
"Blurry in My Hotel Room" (featuring Kuzi)	2021	—	—	Non-album singles
"Bad Love"	2021	—	—	Non-album singles
"Brand" (featuring Layone)	2021	126	—	Bipolar
"Suddenly" (문득; Mundeuk)	2021	20	66	Bipolar
"Breathe" (쉬어; Swieo) (with Anandelight, Unofficialboyy, Geegooin, Mudd the Student featuring Mino)	2021	1	7	Show Me the Money 10
"Limousine" (리무진) (featuring Mino)	2021	1	2	Show Me the Money 10
"MBTI" (featuring Coogie and Loco)	2021	6	26	Show Me the Money 10
"Without You" (네가 없는 밤; Nega eomneun bam) (featuring Ash Island)	2021	9	24	Show Me the Money 10
"Nothing" (지나고 보면; Jinago bomyeon) (featuring Hwasa and Mino)	2021	73	—	Show Me the Money 10
"B.O.T.B" (with Gaeko, Changmo, Don Mills, Los, DeVita, Sole and Since)	2021	— (Note: "B.O.T.B" did not enter the Gaon Digital Chart but charted at number 57 on the Gaon Download Chart.)	—	Non-album singles
"Counting Stars" (featuring Beenzino)	2021	1	5	Non-album singles
"Love Me"	2022	8	11	Non-album singles
"Complex" (자격지심) (featuring Zico)	2022	13	8	Five Senses
"Akita" (featuring Hartts)	2023	170	—	Non-album singles
"Lights Out" (불이꺼지고) (with Sunmi)	2023	160	—	Non-album singles
"Baby" (with Paul Blanco)	2023	—	—	Non-album singles
"Mad" (미쳐버리겠다)	2023	81	—	Non-album singles
"All Night" (밤새)	2024	—	—	Affection
"Criminal" (featuring MC Mong)	2024	—	—	Non-album single
"Selfish" (밤새) (with Bang Ye-dam)	2024	178	—	Affection
"Iconic" (featuring Changmo)	2025	—	—	Non-album single
"—" denotes a recording that did not chart or was not released in that territory.

==== As featured artist ====
List of charted singles as featured artist, showing year released, selected chart positions, and name of the album
Title	Year	Peak chart positions		Album
Title	Year	KOR	KOR Billb.	Album
"Good Night" (Coogie featuring Be'O)	2022	63	74	Re:Up
"Black Heart" (검정색하트; Geomjeongsaekhateu) (Toil featuring Leellamarz, Be'O)	2022	69	—	Between Sat & Sun
"Summer" (Paul Blanco featuring Be'O)	2022	18	—	Non-album single
"Flick" (Roh Yoon-ha featuring Haon, Be'O)	2022	53	—	Show Me the Money 11
"Love War" (Choi Ye-na featuring Be'O)	2023	71	—	Love War
"—" denotes a recording that did not chart or was not released in that territory.

== Filmography ==
=== Television shows ===
Year	Title	Role	Ref.
2019	High School Rapper 3	Contestant	
2021	Show Me the Money 10	Contestant (3rd place)	

== Awards and nominations ==
Name of the award ceremony, year presented, award category, nominee(s) of the award, and the result of the nomination
Award ceremony	Year	Category	Nominee(s) / Work(s)	Result	Ref.
Circle Chart Music Awards	2022	Discovery of the Year – Hiphop	Himself	Won	
Genie Music Awards	2022	Best Hip Hop Artist	Himself	Won	
Genie Music Awards	2022	Song of the Year	"Counting Stars"	Nominated	
Genie Music Awards	2022	Male Solo Artist	Himself	Nominated	
Golden Disc Awards	2023	Male Solo Artist	Himself	Won	
Golden Disc Awards	2023	Best Digital Song	"Counting Stars"	Nominated	
Hanteo Music Awards	2022	Special Award (Hip-Hop)	Be'O	Won	
MAMA Awards	2022	Best Hip-hop & Urban Music	"Counting Stars"	Nominated	
Melon Music Awards	2022	Top 10 Artist	Himself	Won	
Melon Music Awards	2022	Song of the Year	"Counting Stars"	Longlisted	
Melon Music Awards	2022	Best Male Solo	Himself	Nominated	
K-Global Heart Dream Awards	2022	K-Global Hip-hop Award	Himself	Won	
Korean Hip-hop Awards	2022	New Artist of the Year	Himself	Nominated	
Korean Hip-hop Awards	2022	Hip-hop Track of the Year	"Counting Stars"	Nominated	
