= Since 16' =

Studio album by Since
- Released: July 16, 2021
- Length: 19:45
- Label: Boiling Point Project (Note: Boiling Point Project is VMC's album curation project which releases and promotes works by outstanding independent rappers.)

Since chronology
Since 16' (2021)	High Risk High Return (2022)

Since 16' is the debut studio album by South Korean rapper Since. It was released through Boiling Point Project on July 16, 2021. It later peaked at number 87 on the Circle Album Chart.

== Background ==
In an interview with Marie Claire Korea, Since explained how the album was produced.

Deepflow was a special guest at the concert I participated in last year, and after watching my performance, he said he enjoyed it. I showed him my work right away and I was offered the Boiling Point Project. That's how the album was born.

== Music and lyrics ==
In Since 16', Since shares her thoughts and experiences about music after she started rapping in 2016. In "Hol' Up", "Cop", "Honest", "Fist Down", and "Boarding", she shows her confidence and aspiration through speedy and rough rapping, which is her strength. In the latter half of the album, she experiments with melodic raps that are more sentimental and delicate than those of the first half. In "Spring Rain", she uses the symbolism of spring rain that represents both reality and success.

== Critical reception ==
Hwang Duha of Rhythmer rated the album 3.4 out of 5 stars. According to him, "the fact that Since is a female rapper can act as a bias - which can be either good or bad. However, it is very impressive that she does not seem to care about that." He also described the album as a "successful self-introduction of a rookie rapper who has just begun to spread her wings."

=== Year-end lists ===
Publication	List	Rank	Ref.
Rhythmer	100 Best Korean Rap Albums of 2021	Honorable mention	

== Track listing ==
All lyrics are written by Since; all music is composed by Smugglers.

No.	Title	Lyrics	Music	Length
1.	"Hol' Up" (홀로; Hollo)		Sean	2:10
2.	"Cop" (featuring 365Lit)	365Lit	Hyeon	1:52
3.	"Honest"			0:53
4.	"Fist Down" (featuring Don Mills)	Don Mills		2:57
5.	"Boarding" (탑승; Tapseung)		Noir	2:07
6.	"Railroad" (featuring Ourealgoat)	Ourealgoat	Hyeon, Sean, Since, Ourealgoat	2:31
7.	"Interlude"		Hyeon, Sean, Since	1:38
8.	"Spring Rain" (봄비; Bombi) (featuring Rakon)	Rakon	Hyeon, Sean, Since, Rakon	2:57
9.	"Memories Got No Power" (추억엔 힘이 없지; Chueogen himi eopji) (featuring Meloh)	Meloh	Sean, Nash, Since, Meloh	2:35
Total length:				19:45

== Charts ==
Chart (2022)	Peak position
South Korean Albums (Circle)	57
