= Acrobat (Jo Gwang-il song) =

"곡예사"

Single by Gwangil Jo
- Language: Korean
- English title: Acrobat
- Released: April 1, 2020
- Genre: Hip hop
- Length: 3:07
- Label: Dippin' Carls Records
- Composer: Ahwu
- Lyricist: Gwangil Jo

Music video
- "곡예사" on YouTube

"Acrobat" (Korean: 곡예사; RR: Gogyesa) is a song by South Korean rapper Jo Gwang-il. It was released on April 1, 2020, by Dippin' Carls Records.

== Music and lyrics ==
Gwangil Jo compare himself to an acrobat riding a rope. He expresses confidence and wild ambition in his lyrics. Hip-hop fans commented that "Acrobat is not just a fast rap song but a song with a groovy rhythm."

== Accolades ==
"Acrobat" was nominated for hip-hop track of the year at the Korean Hip-hop Awards. According to netizens, it is "the best hip hop song of the year without any doubt" as it "gave a fresh shock in the hip-hop scene where auto-tuned melodic rap is the trend."

=== Year-end lists ===
Publication	Accolade	Rank
IZM	"Best K-pop Songs of 2020"	—N/a

== Charts ==
Chart (2020)	Peak position
South Korea (Gaon)	— (Note: "Acrobat" did not enter the Gaon Digital Chart, but peaked at number 18 on the Gaon Singing Room chart.)

== Remix ==
"Acrobat Remix" (곡예사 Remix) is the remix of "Acrobat" by South Korean rappers Gwangil Jo, Basick, P-Type, Skull, Sikboy, Olltii, Minos, Brown Tigger, and Jazzmal. It was released on October 16, 2020 by Dippin' Carls Records as the tenth track of Gwangil Jo's album Dark Adaptation (Korean: 암순응; RR: Amsuneung).

=== Critical reception ===
"Acrobat Remix" was nominated for collaboration of the year at the Korean Hip-hop Awards. According to netizens, it has "the most spectacular line-up of this year's collaboration and beat that entertains the ear."
