= Jo Gwang-il =

South Korean rapper (born 1996)

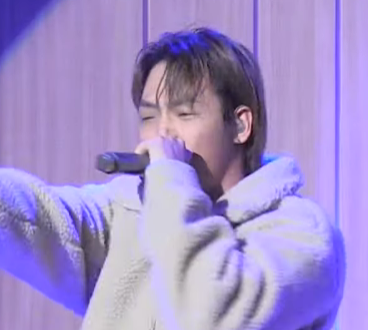

Background information
- Born: September 12, 1996 (age 29); Nam District, Gwangju, South Korea
- Genres: Hip hop
- Occupations: Rapper; songwriter
- Years active: 2019-present
- Label: Dippin' Carls Records

Jo Gwang-il (Korean: 조광일; born September 12, 1996) is a South Korean rapper and songwriter. He is known for his fast raps with Korean plosive sounds. He debuted in 2019 with the single "Grow Back". In 2020, he released his breakout single "Acrobat". He won the rap competition television show Show Me the Money 10 in 2021.

== Early life ==
Jo Gwang-il was born on September 12, 1996, in Nam District, Gwangju, South Korea. He wanted to be a professional StarCraft player, but the company unexpectedly stopped its service. He turned his attention to music and began rapping at age 17. He graduated from Jeonnam Technical High School.

== Career ==
In 2019, Jo Gwang-il released his debut single "Grow Back". In April 2020, he released his breakout single "Acrobat". It peaked at number 18 on the Gaon Singing Room Chart and its music video amassed more than 10 million views. It also received positive reviews from critics and was nominated for Hip-hop Track of the Year at the Korean Hip-hop Awards. In October 2022, he released his debut studio album Dark Adaptation. In 2021, he won the rap competition television show Show Me the Money 10.

== Philanthropy ==
Jo Gwang-il donated the prize money of Show Me the Money 10 to Holt International Children's Services.

== Discography ==
=== Studio album ===
Title	Details	Peak chart position
Title	Details	KOR
Dark Adaptation (암순응; Amsuneung)	Released: October 16, 2020; Label: Dippin Carls Records; Format: CD, digital download	64

=== EP ===
Title	Details
New World (신세계; Sinsegye) (with Brown Tigger)	Released: November 26, 2020; Label: Dippin Carls Records; Format: Digital download
Metamorphosis (변태; Byeontae)	Released: August 22, 2022; Label: Self-released; Format: Digital download

=== Singles ===
Title	Year	Peak chart position	Album
Title	Year	KOR	Album
"Grow Back"	2019	—	Non-album singles
"Acrobat" (곡예사; Gogyesa)	2020	— (Note: "Acrobat" did not enter the Gaon Digital Chart but peaked at number 8 on the Gaon Singing Room Chart.)	Non-album singles
"THC" (with Brown Tigger)	2020	—	New World
"Korea" (한국; Hanguk)	2020	—	Dark Adaptation
"Layoff" (정리해고; Jeongnihaego) (with Basick)	2020	—	Non-album single
"Raw" (with Brown Tigger) (featuring Kim Seung-min)	2020	—	New World
"Memoirs" (회상록; Hoesangnok)	2020	—	Dark Adaptation
"Depersonalization" (이인증; Iinjeung)	2021	—	Non-album singles
"4HC" (with Brown Tigger, Walo and Yonge Jaundice)	2021	—	Non-album singles
"Rambo" (람보)	2021	—	Non-album singles
"Let's Disco Dance" (디스코나 출래; Diseukona chullae)	2021	—	Non-album singles
"Anarchy Freestyle" (난세 Freestyle; Nanse Freestyle) (featuring Boi B, Sikboy, Bruno Champman, Brown Tigger, Yonge Jaundice, Hangzoo and Walo)	2021	—	Non-album singles
"Perfect" (퍼펙트) (featuring Brown Tigger)	2021	—	Non-album singles
"Wake Up" (with Gaeko, Ourealgoat, Since, Ahn Byeong-woong and Tabber)	2021	3	Show Me the Money 10 Episode 1
"Thorn" (가시; Gasi) (with Gaeko and Justhis)	2021	22	Show Me the Money 10 Episode 2
"Waterbomb" (호우주의; Houjuui) (featuring Gaeko and Nucksal)	2021	14	Show Me the Money 10 Semi Final
"Garion" (가리온) (featuring Dynamic Duo)	2021	49	Show Me the Money 10 Final
"Journey" (쿠키영상; Kukiyeongsang) (featuring Ailee, Hangzoo and Gaeko)	2021	101	Show Me the Money 10 Final
"Mansae" (만세)	2022	—	Non-album singles
"On and On" (거듭해; Geodeuphae) (featuring Fana)	2022	—	Non-album singles
"Break the Line" (featuring Brown Tigger)	2022	—	Non-album singles
"Compensation" (깽값; Kkaenggap) (featuring Gaeko)	2022	—	Non-album singles
"Ghost Buster"	2022	—	Café Minamdang

== Filmography ==
=== TV ===
Year	Title	Role	Ref.
2021	Show Me the Money 10	Contestant (Winner)	

== Awards and nominations ==
Award	Year	Nominee	Category	Result	Ref.
Korean Hip-hop Awards	2021	Himself	New Artist of the Year	Nominated	
Korean Hip-hop Awards	2021	"Acrobat"	Hip-hop Track of the Year	Nominated	
Korean Hip-hop Awards	2021	"Acrobat Remix"	Collaboration of the Year	Nominated	
