= Kim Ho-joong =

South Korean singer (born 1991)

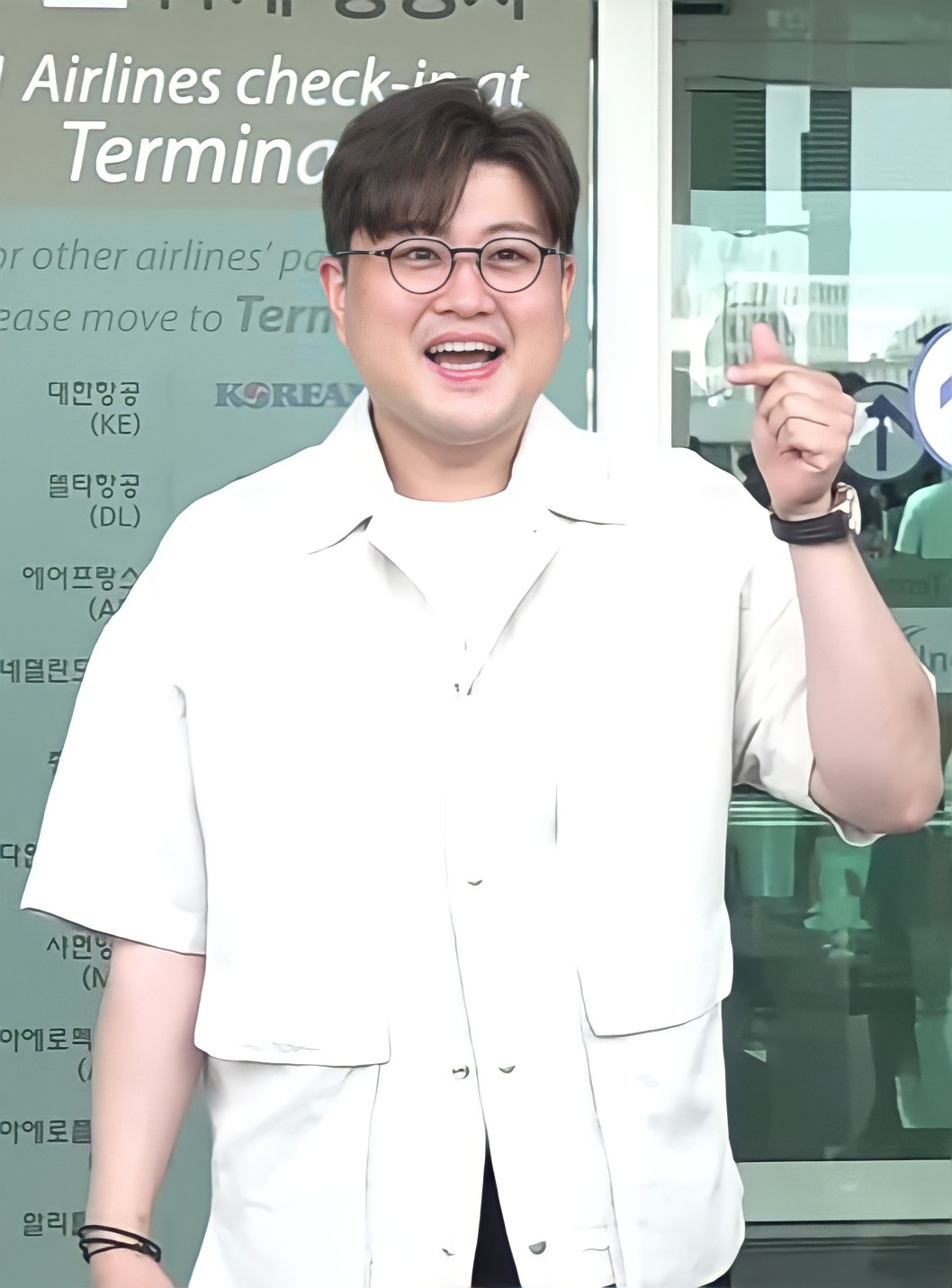
- Kim in July 2022

Background information
- Born: October 2, 1991 (age 35)
- Origin: Ulsan, South Korea
- Genres: Trot, opera
- Occupation: Singer
- Years active: 2013–present
- Label: Think Entertainment

Korean name
- Hangul: 김호중
- RR: Gim Hojung
- MR: Kim Hojung

Kim Ho-joong (Korean: 김호중; born October 2, 1991) is a South Korean classical crossover singer. He came to prominence after a fourth-place finish in TV Chosun show Mr. Trot. During his military service, he served as a public service worker and was discharged on June 9, 2022.

== Philanthropy ==
On March 22, 2022, Kim donated 500 pieces of Geumsan Aesthetic Red Ginseng products (worth 67.5 million won) to Sky Garden under the Welfare Foundation of Love, a social welfare company.

On February 23, 2023, Kim donated 50 million won to help in the 2023 Turkey–Syria earthquake through UNICEF Korea Committee.

== Discography ==
=== Studio albums ===
Title	Album details	Peak chart positions	Sales	Certifications
Title	Album details	KOR	Sales	Certifications
Our Family (우리家)	Released: September 5, 2020; Label: Think Entertainment; Format: CD, digital download	1	KOR: 539,350	KMCA: 2× Platinum
The Classic Album	I - My Favorite Arias: Released: December 11, 2020; Label: Warner Music Korea; Format: CD, digital download	1	KOR: 266,430	KMCA: Platinum
The Classic Album	II - My Favorite Songs: Released: December 11, 2020; Label: Warner Music Korea; Format: CD, digital download	2	KOR: 266,268	KMCA: Platinum
Panorama	Released: July 27, 2022; Label: Think Entertainment; Format: CD, digital download	2	KOR: 686,586	KMCA: 2× Platinum

=== Extended plays ===
Title	EP details	Peak chart positions	Sales	Certifications
Title	EP details	KOR	Sales	Certifications
A Life (세상)	Released: April 4, 2024; Label: Think Entertainment; Format: CD, digital download	2	KOR: 827,889	KMCA: 3× Platinum

=== Singles ===
Title	Year	Peak chart positions	Album
Title	Year	KOR	Album
"My Only Love" (나의 사람아)	2013	—	Non-album single
"You and Me" (너나 나나)	2020	110	Our Family
"I Love You More Than Me" (나보다 더 사랑해요)	2020	28	Our Family
"Grandmother" (할무니)	2020	47	Our Family
"In Full Bloom" (만개)	2020	58	Our Family
"No Umbrella" (우산이 없어요)	2020	62	Our Family
"I'm Alive Because of You" (살았소)	2020	69	Non-album single
"Nessun Dorma" (아무도 잠들지 마라)	2020	112	The Classic Album
"Un Amore Cosi Grande" (위대한 사랑)	2020	118	The Classic Album
"Person Who Shines" (빛이 나는 사람)	2022	21	Non-album single
"Promise" (약속 [約束])	2022	41	Panorama
"Panorama" (주마등)	2022	45	Panorama
"Sad Silhouette" (슬픈등)	2022	65	VitaDolce
"Beautiful Life" (인생은 뷰티풀)	2022	46	VitaDolce
"Meet You Among Them" (그중에 그대를 만나)	2022	43	Non-album singles
"My Voice" (나의 목소리로)	2022	35	Non-album singles
"With You" (당신을 만나) (with Song Ga-in)	2023	50	Non-album singles
"A Letter" (편지 한 장 (부제: 서른에 만난 첫 세상))	2023	21	Non-album singles
"If I Leave" (그대... 떠나도)	2024	63	A Life

=== Soundtrack appearances ===
List of soundtrack appearances, showing year released, selected chart positions, and name of the album
Title	Year	Peak chart positions	Album
Title	Year	KOR	Album
"Meet You Among Them" (그중에 그대를 만나)	2022	83	Three Bold Siblings OST
"In the End It's You" (결국엔 당신입니다)	2024	95	Beauty and Mr. Romantic OST

=== Other charted songs ===
List of other charted songs, showing year released, selected chart positions, and name of the album
Title	Year	Peak chart positions	Album
Title	Year	KOR	Album
"I'll Be Your Love" (애인이 되어줄게요)	2023	54	Our Family
"On Springtime" (봄날에)	2024	102	A Life
"Windy Day" (바람이 부는 날엔)	2024	104	A Life
"Come with Me" (함께 가 줄래)	2024	103	A Life
"Time Flies" (쏜살)	2024	95	A Life
"Starry Night" (별 헤는 밤)	2024	106	A Life

== Hit-and-run ==
In May 2024, South Korean trot singer Kim Ho-joong faced multiple controversies, including allegations of past school bullying and involvement in a hit-and-run incident while driving under the influence. A former classmate from Gyeongbuk Arts High School accused Kim of physical assault and coercion during their school years, claiming the abuse led to his withdrawal from the institution. Kim was involved in a collision with a taxi in Seoul's Gangnam district on May 9, 2024. He fled the scene and later instructed his manager to assume responsibility for the accident. Police investigations uncovered a recording of Kim directing his manager to falsely confess, leading to his arrest on charges related to the hit-and-run and subsequent cover-up. These incidents have significantly impacted Kim's career, resulting in canceled performances and potential legal repercussions. Police have secured a phone recording of trot singer Kim Ho-joong asking his manager to take the blame for the accident that occurred on May 9.

== Filmography ==
=== Film ===
Year	Title	Role	Notes	Ref.
2022	Life is Beautiful: Vita Dolce	himself	ScreenX Original	

=== Television shows ===
Year	Title	Role	Notes	Ref.
2020	Mr. Trot	Contestant		
2020	Romantic Call Centre	Main cast		
2022	Boss in the Mirror	Boss		
2022	Kim Ho-jung's Hangawi Fantasia	Main Cast	SBS Chuseok Special	
2022	Take the Blessings	Regular Member		

== Ambassadorship ==
- First Asian Ambassador to the Luciano Pavarotti Foundation and the Andrea Bocelli Foundation (2022)

== Awards and nominations ==
Year	Award	Category	Nominee(s) / Work(s)	Result	Ref.
2020	Gaon Chart Music Awards	Artist of the Year - Digital Music (September)	"In Full Bloom"	Nominated	
2020	Golden Disc Awards	Best New Artist	Kim Ho-joong	Won	
2020	Golden Disc Awards	Album of the Year	Our Family	Nominated	
2020	Melon Music Awards	Top 10 Artist	Kim Ho-joong	Won	
2020	Melon Music Awards	Artist of the Year	Kim Ho-joong	Nominated	
2020	Seoul Music Awards	K-wave Popularity Award	Kim Ho-joong	Nominated	
2020	Seoul Music Awards	Popularity Award	Kim Ho-joong	Nominated	
2020	Seoul Music Awards	Trot Award	Our Family	Nominated	
2021	Gaon Chart Music Awards	Album of the Year – first Quarter	The Classic Album I – My Favorite Arias	Nominated	
2021	Gaon Chart Music Awards	Album of the Year – first Quarter	The Classic Album II – My Favorite Songs	Nominated	
2021	Golden Disc Awards	Album Bonsang	The Classic Album I – My Favorite Arias	Nominated	
2022	The Fact Music Awards	Fan N Star Angel N Star Award	Kim Ho-joong	Won	
2022	Melon Music Awards	Netizen Popularity Award	Kim Ho-joong	Nominated	
2022	Genie Music Awards	Singer of the Year (Daesang)	Kim Ho-joong	Nominated	
2022	Genie Music Awards	Genie Music Popularity Award	Kim Ho-joong	Nominated	
2022	Genie Music Awards	Best Male Solo Artist	Kim Ho-joong	Nominated	
2022	Genie Music Awards	Album of the Year (Daesang)	Panorama	Nominated	
2023	18th Seoul International Drama Awards	Best Original Soundtrack (OST)	"Meet You Among Them"	Won	

=== Listicles ===
Name of publisher, year listed, name of listicle, and placement
Publisher	Year	Listicle	Placement	Ref.
Forbes	2021	Korea Power Celebrity	22nd	
