= Slom (musician) =

South Korean music producer

Slom 슬롬
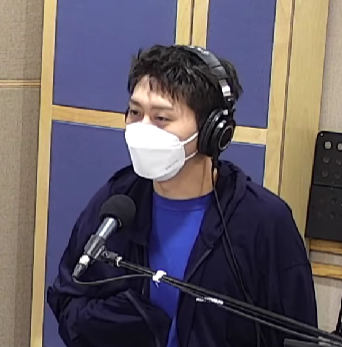
- Slom in 2021

Background information
- Born: Kim Min-woo; December 17, 1993 (age 32); Palo Alto, California, U.S.
- Genres: R&B
- Occupation: Music producer
- Years active: 2019-present
- Label: Standard Friends

Kim Min-woo (Korean: 김민우; born December 17, 1993), known professionally as Slom (Korean: 슬롬), is a South Korean-American music producer. He first garnered attention when he appeared on Show Me the Money 10 as judge and producer in 2021. Earlier in the year, he and singer-songwriter Sumin had also released the album Miniseries to critical acclaim. In 2022, he signed to Standard Friends and released his debut studio album Weather Report.

== Early life and education ==
Kim Min-woo was born on December 17, 1993, in Palo Alto, California. He started making music in 2014, and has said that some of his major influences are Dibiase, Evil Needle, Mr. Carmack, and Kaytranada. The name "Slom" is a portmanteau of "Minwoo" and "sloth", given to him by a friend who said he looked like a sloth.

He graduated from UCLA with a bachelor's degree in sociology.

== Career ==
Slom released his debut single "2Nite" in 2019. In September 2021, he released the album Miniseries, a collaboration between himself and singer-songwriter Sumin, to critical acclaim. In October, he appeared on Show Me the Money 10 as judge and producer. "Merry-Go-Round", a song he composed on the show, peaked at number one on the Gaon Digital Chart.

In October 2022, he signed to Standard Friends, a label founded by Zion.T. He appeared on Show Me the Money 11 as judge and producer with Jay Park and became the winning team. He released his debut studio album Weather Report, which received critical acclaim.

== Artistry ==
Slom has stated that he "re-creates things" under influence of his favorite artists. He was influenced by Donald Fagen's The Nightfly and Antônio Carlos Jobim.

== Discography ==
=== Studio album ===
Title	Details	Peak chart positions
Title	Details	KOR
Weather Report	Released: October 27, 2022; Label: Standard Friends; Format: Digital download, streaming	32

=== Collaborative album ===
Title	Details
Miniseries (with Sumin)	Released: September 15, 2021; Label: EMA Recordings; Format: Digital download, CD, LP

=== Single ===
Title	Year
"2Nite" (featuring Ace Hashimoto and Taichi Mukai)	2019
"F.A.F.F."	2023

== Filmography ==
=== Television ===
Year	Title	Role	Ref.
2021	Show Me the Money 10	Judge and producer	
2022	Show Me the Money 11	Judge and producer	

== Awards and nominations ==
Award	Year	Nominee	Category	Result	Ref.
Korean Hip-hop Awards	2022	Miniseries	R&B Album of the Year	Nominated	
Korean Hip-hop Awards	2022	"The Gonlan Song"	R&B Track of the Year	Nominated	
Korean Hip-hop Awards	2022	Himself	Producer of the Year	Nominated	
Korean Hip-hop Awards	2023	"Anirago"	R&B Track of the Year	Nominated	
Korean Hip-hop Awards	2023	Himself	Producer of the Year	Nominated	
Korean Music Awards	2022	Miniseries	Best R&B Album	Nominated	
Korean Music Awards	2022	"The Gonlan Song"	Best R&B Song	Won	
Korean Music Awards	2023	Weather Report	Best R&B Album	Nominated	
Korean Music Awards	2023	"Anirago"	Best R&B Song	Nominated	
