= Show Me the Money 10 =

Tenth season of South Korean rap competition TV show

- Season 10
- Hosted by: Kim Jin-pyo; DJ REDEF (Resident DJ)
- Judges: Team Yumdda x Toil; Yumdda; Toil; Team Gaeko x Code Kunst; Gaeko; Code Kunst; Team Gray x Mino: Gray; Mino; Team Zion.T x Slom; Zion.T; Slom
- Winner: Jo Gwang-il
- Runners-up: Since (1st runner-up); Be'O (2nd runner-up); Koonta (3rd runner-up)

Release
- Original network: Mnet
- Original release: October 1 – December 3, 2021

Season chronology
- ← Previous; Show Me the Money 9 Next → Show Me the Money 11

The tenth season of the series Show Me the Money (known as Show Me the Money 10: The Original) premiered on October 1, 2021. It was broadcast every Friday at 23:00 (KST) on Mnet. The season featured four new producer teams Yumdda and Toil, Gaeko and Code Kunst, Gray and Mino, and Zion.T and Slom.

This season saw approximately 27,000 applicants, the most in the show's history. The increase in number of contestants joining the show was due to the financial difficulties most rappers faced due to the COVID-19 pandemic. With the lack of in-person concerts, events, and gigs, most of them began to focus on online streaming and web-content platforms which provide minimal income.

This season will also be a "10th Anniversary Project" that crosses broadcasting, online and Over The Top platforms under the concept of "The Original", celebrating the show's rich history of serving as a forefront of the Korean Hip-hop scene, as well as showcasing the emergence of up and coming Korean artists who joined the show.

The winner of this season is Jo Gwang-il, with Team Gaeko x Code Kunst as the winning producer team. He will receive a prize money of ₩300,000,000, plus a Mini Cooper, album production support and a 1-month stay in an ultra-luxury hotel suite.

== Judges ==
Team Yumdda x Toil

- Yumdda: Rapper and co-founder of the recently established Daytona Entertainment. Member of hip-hop collective Back N' Forth.
- Toil: Producer under Daytona Entertainment. Member of Wayside Town Crew.

Team Gaeko x Code Kunst

- Gaeko: Co-founder of Amoeba Culture and one half of the hip-hop group Dynamic Duo. Previously participated in season 6 and 9 as a producer/judge for Teams Dynamic Duo and DyWhy respectively.
- Code Kunst: Music producer signed under AOMG, formerly signed under the defunct HIGHGRND. He was a judge/producer in seasons 777 and 9 for Team CodePalo.

Team Gray x Mino

- Gray: Rapper and producer under AOMG. Previously participated in season 5, where he was one of the winning producers of Team AOMG. Member of VV:D crew with Team Zion.T x Slom producer Zion.T.
- Mino: Rapper and member of the K-Pop group Winner under YG Entertainment. Previously participated in season 4 under his real name Song Min-ho, where he finished first runner-up under Team ZiPal.

Team Zion.T x Slom

- Zion.T: Singer and producer under The Black Label. He was a judge/producer in season 5 with Team YG, and in season 9 where he was one of the winning producers for Team Zion.T x Giriboy. Member of Holocoin with fellow Producer/Judge Slom, and VV:D crew with Team Gray x Mino producer Gray.
- Slom: Independent producer. Member of Holocoin with fellow Producer/Judge Zion.T. He had co-produced most of Team Zion.T X Giriboy's discography in season 9. Previously signed under Halftime Records.

== Teams ==
The final Producer Team line-ups were formed during the Team Rapper Casting round, in which five members per team were selected.

Team Zion T x Slom (also known as Team Tsla)

- Sokodomo - Member of Eumcha1ld. Signed under Sony Music. Previously participated in season 777, and in season 3 of High School Rapper under his real name Yang Seung-ho.
- Don Mills - Rapper signed under VMC (Vismajor Company).
- Khakii - Signed under Wavy. Previously participated in season 9 as a member of Team Code Kunst x Paloalto.
- Northfacegawd - Signed under Starex Records. Formerly known by his rapper name Bredy when he started his rap career.
- A-Chess - Member of SP1B crew. Participated in all the previous seasons, but started advancing further than the Rapper Evaluation Round from season 7.

Team Gray x Mino (also known as Team Graynoma)

- Be'O - Signed under FameUs Entertainment. Previously participated in seasons 777 and 9, and in the third season of High School Rapper under his real name Yoo Chan-wook.
- Mudd the Student - Member of musical collective Balming Tiger.
- Anandelight - Christian rapper. Signed under Hadash Music.
- Geegooin - Member of Hip-hop trio Rhythm Power, who are co-CEOs of their own label Team Player. Formerly an artist of Amoeba Culture. Previously participated in season 4 as a member of Team AOMG, and in season 6.
- Unofficialboyy - Member of Team D.O.G. (Drug Online Gate). Rapper and ex-leader of Dickids crew and member of XXYXNAF crew. Signed under Ackermann. Previously participated in seasons 4, 5 and 7, season 8 as a preliminary member of Team BGM-v, in season 9, and the first season of High School Rapper. Also known by his rap names Luda, Trapstarsureen, and Baddie Homie, and through his real name Lee Su-rin.

Team Gaeko x Code Kunst (also known as Team CoKo)

- Jo Gwang-il - Rapper signed under Dippin' Carls Records. Known as one of the fastest Korean rappers, alongside Outsider. Was nominated for Rookie of the Year at the 2021 Korean Hip-hop Awards.
- Since - Independent rapper. She was invited by VMC (Vismajor) CEO Deepflow to sign to their company. Member of VAT crew. Winner of season 2 Openmicswg freestyle challenge. Previously participated in seasons 777 and 9.
- Tabber - Signed under Dean's label you.will.knovv.
- Ourealgoat - Signed under FDT. Previously participated in season 9.
- Ahn Byeong-woong - Signed under Wavy. Previously participated in seasons 8 as a preliminary member of 40-Crew and season 9 as a member of Team Code Kunst x Paloalto.

Team Yumdda x Toil (also known as Team Tonawayum)

- Koonta - Korean reggae artist signed under Sajah Records. One half of the collaboration group Rude Paper.
- Basick - Veteran rapper and CEO under his own label Outlive Records. Winner of season 4 as a member of Team Brand New Music. Previously a member of hip hop crew Jiggy Fellaz and duo Double Trouble with season 4 semifinalist Innovator.
- 365lit - Member of UnderSeongsuBridge (USB) crew. Previously participated in season 9 as a member of Team Code Kunst x Paloalto.
- Hwang Ji-sang - Independent rapper. Also known by his rapper name H-Venom.
- Song Min-young - The youngest contestant to join this season at 13 years old (Korean age).

== Rounds ==
=== Round one: rapper selection round ===
After sending in their audition clips, those selected by the production crew will attend the rapper selection round. As a safety precaution from the COVID-19 pandemic, the contestants will be divided into small groups, with each contestant socially distanced from one another, and have a plexiglass placed between him/her and the assigned producer. Each contestant will perform a short a cappella rap in front of the producer. The producer then provide an in-depth evaluation of the contestant, and determine if they advanced to the next round. Unlike the previous seasons where the producer typically hand the SMTM neck chain to the contestant, the contestant will grab the chain at the corner of the plexiglass. 132 contestants advanced into the next round.

Notable contestants from the rapper selection round

Producer judge	Passed selection round	Failed selection round
Yumdda	Song Min-young, Northfacegawd, Koonta, Woo Tae-hyeong, Choi Sang-hyeon, Hwang Ji-sang, Lee Dae-eun, Marvel J, Park Hyeon-gyu, Lil Sunder11, Dejibaby, Nakmin Choi,	Lee Jin, Kim Ye-yun, Ian BTC (Bitcoin mascot), Choi Se-yeon
Toil	Blase, Kwon Yeong-kwang, Greenbeige, Kim Dong-wook, Kim Sang-hun, Kim hyeon-jik, Daily Wave, Park E-Sell, YesJunior24, yoboy, Johny Kwony	QDR, Min Jae-wook, Kim Ma-ri, Lee Jong-hun
Gaeko	Don Mills, Since, Jo Gwang-il, Choi Hwan-hee, Kang Jong-hun, Kye Yul-E, N-Chovi, Yonge Jaundice, Seo Yu-chan, Padi, Tan, Trilla Gang, Kanto, Choi Jun-pyo, Yeyebeen, gonhills, Park Jin-oh, Views in i, Oh Soo-jung, Im Gyung-bin, Jung Hyung-jun	Lee Kwang-seok, Bang Jae-min, Lee Chan-wu
Code Kunst	kitsyojii, Geegooin, Win, Gwabtopal, Kim Sung-min, Park Yu-bin, Bae Jae-won, Seo Min-gyu, Seo Jung-hun, Song Yeong-chan, Shin Jong-min, Shin Jung-ha, Ourealgoat, Lee Seon-min, Jeon He-ri, Castle J, Timefever, Choo Hyun-seung	Ping Ping Man, Indego Aid, Off Beat Genius Rapper
Gray	365lit, San E, Khakii, Eugene Cha, Kang Jeong-ho, Pullik, Loxx Punkman, Kim Dae-hyeon, Kim Min, ggangse, Anandelight, Anngyeungjaebee, Unofficialboyy, Im Seon-kyun, Jeong Eui-yeong, Jo Hyeon-je, Chan Hyun, Choi Min-hyeong, Feless	Yuk Ji-dam, Lee Jae-ho, Kim Min-su, ELooE, Hotchkiss; Kim Dong-hee, Lee Jae-hun
Mino	A-Chess, Mudd The Student, Basick, Yumewanaii, Sycho, Choi Min-seo, Sparky, Be'O, Anandelight, Kim Hyeon-ah, Raphael, Park Su-hwan, Shin Jae-hyeok, Shin Jeong-min, Woojay, Uzi, Yoon Joo-hyeok, Jeong Jae-hwan, Ji Chanel, Ha Seong-min, Hijvc Kid	NY Dogg, Kang Dong-hun
Zion.T	Sokodomo, Son Yeong-dae, Kang Seong-sik, Kim Min-seok, Kim Jin-yeob, Noa, Lil Hodong, Song Jin-woo, Yanu, Yankie, Jang Rae-hyuk, James An	Kim Kyung-hwan, Han Young-jun
Slom	Shin Hyong-jun, Implanted Kid, Ahn Byeong-woong, Mac Kidd, Tabber, Kim Do-woo, Kim Min-woo, Nudeboi Seo, Simo, Loxx Punkman, Min Kyeong-ho, Song Jun-ho, Ohiorabbit, Lee Jae-seong, Jeon Chan-ju, Terry, Posadic	Kim Seung-ho

Received the SMTM necklace from one of the SMTM producers and will advance to the next round.
Eliminated from the show

=== Round two: 60-second beat rap ===
The remaining 132 contestants will participate in the 60-second beat rap, where each contestant must do a one-minute rap in front of all judges. At least one producer team has to pass the contestant in order to progress to the next round. This season will also incorporate the use of augmented reality (AR) to emphasize on the contestants who received an "all pass" or "all fail" status. If the contestant receives an "All Pass", the stage will virtually go up, signifying his/her continuation to the next round. Conversely, contestants receiving an "all fail", are eliminated from the show and must surrender their SMTM necklace by throwing it to the virtual fire. At the end of the round, the producers will select eight memorable contestants that failed the round for the Revival round. They will perform the a cappella version of their 60-second rap performance in front of the Producers and will decide whether to revive the contestant or not. A total of 56 contestants (51 contestants that passed this round, five contestants were revived) advanced to the next round.

Notable contestants at the 60-Second Beat Rap

Beat	Rapper	Team Zion.T x Slom	Team Gray x Mino	Team Gaeko x Code Kunst	Team Yumdda x Toil
Northfacegawd - Bokdukbang (Prod. 606 gus)	Northfacegawd	Pass	Pass	Pass	Pass
xs - Limp (Prod. hecop)	Implanted Kid	Fail	Fail	Fail	Fail
Since - GO UP (ft. Hahoe) (Prod. Lean$moke)	Since	Fail	Pass	Pass	Pass
N/A	Park E-Sell	Fail	Pass	Pass	Pass
2nd Round Mission Beat (Prod. 365lit)	365lit	Fail	Pass	Pass	Pass
N/A	JP	Pass	Fail	Fail	Fail
N/A	Johny Kwony	Fail	Fail	Fail	Fail
N/A	Ha Seong-min	Fail	Fail	Fail	Fail
Untitled (Prod. stally)	Ahn Byeong-woong	Pass	Pass	Pass	Pass
Drift (Prod. basecamp)	Khakii	Pass	Fail	Pass	Fail
N/A	Nakmin Choi	Fail	Fail	Fail	Pass
N/A	Dejibaby	Fail	Fail	Fail	Fail
N/A	Sparky	Fail	Fail	Fail	Fail
N/A	Kim Sang-hun	Fail	Fail	Fail	Fail
N/A	Hijvc Kid	Fail	Fail	Fail	Fail
Have a Nice Day (Prod $ig $aucer)	Hwang Ji-sang	Pass	Pass	Pass	Pass
untitled (Prod. 2xxx)	Tabber	Pass	Pass	Pass	Pass
N/A	Kim Min-woo	Fail	Fail	Fail	Fail
N/A	Timefever	Fail	Fail	Fail	Fail
N/A	Lee Sung-min	Fail	Fail	Fail	Fail
First Class (ASAP Rocky x J.Cole Type Beat) (Prod. Kin Kury)	Unofficialboyy	Pass	Pass	Pass	Pass
CarTa - AROMA (ft. Anandelight) (Prod. CARTA)	Anandelight	Pass	Pass	Pass	Pass
N/A	Song Jun-ho	Fail	Fail	Fail	Fail
N/A	Song Yeong-jin	Fail	Fail	Fail	Fail
Counting Star (Prod. Wonderlust Beats)	Be'O	Pass	Pass	Pass	Pass
N/A	Jeong Jae-hwan	Fail	Fail	Fail	Fail
N/A	Kim Jin-yeob	Fail	Fail	Fail	Fail
N/A	Nudeboi Seo	Fail	Fail	Fail	Fail
N/A	Gwabtopal	Fail	Fail	Fail	Fail
N/A	Yeyebeen	Fail	Fail	Fail	Fail
N/A	Trilla Gang	Fail	Fail	Fail	Fail
Yankie - I.N.D.O. (ft. Tablo) (Prod. Planet Shiver)	Yankie	Fail	Fail	Fail	Fail
Geegooin - JAENUNGCHUNG	Geegooin	Pass	Pass	Pass	Pass
N/A	Lee Jae-sung	Fail	Fail	Fail	Fail
N/A	Kang Seong-sik	Fail	Fail	Pass	Pass
N/A	Jeong Chan-ju	Fail	Fail	Fail	Fail
N/A	Ha Seong-min	Fail	Fail	Fail	Fail
N/A	Im Seong-gyu	Fail	Fail	Fail	Fail
N/A	Yoon Ju-hyeok	Fail	Fail	Fail	Fail
In Need (Prod. Ourealgoat)	Ourealgoat	Pass	Fail	Pass	Pass
Lil Hodong - I'm a Tiger	Lil Hodong	Fail	Fail	Fail	Fail
2nd Round (Prod. XENO VIBE)	Basick	Fail	Fail	Fail	Fail
No name (Prod. DMNT)	Koonta	Pass	Pass	Pass	Pass
Blase - Peace Out (ft. Khan) (Prod. Yoon)	Blase	Pass	Pass	Pass	Pass
Trippin (Prod. TREETIME)	Sycho	Pass	Pass	Fail	Pass
Savage (Prod. umjadeplant)	Mac Kidd	Fail	Fail	Fail	Fail
N/A	Jeong Eui-yeong	Fail	Pass	Fail	Pass
N/A	Im Gyung-bin	Fail	Fail	Fail	Fail
N/A	Park Su-hwan	Fail	Fail	Fail	Fail
N/A	Anngyeungjaebee	Fail	Fail	Fail	Fail
polodared Choi Sang-hyeon: (Prod. CpBeatz)	Choi Sang-hyeon	Fail	Fail	Fail	Pass
Don Mills - Don Mills Style	Don Mills	Pass	Pass	Pass	Pass
Zflat (Choi Hwan-hee) - Undefined	Choi Hwan-hee	Fail	Fail	Pass	Fail
Jamezz - MAMA (ft. Sokodomo & ALT) (Prod. Jamezz)	Jamezz	Pass	Pass	Pass	Fail
N/A	Seo Min-gyu	Fail	Fail	Fail	Fail
N/A	YesJunior24	Fail	Fail	Fail	Fail
N/A	Woo Tae-hyeong	Fail	Fail	Fail	Fail
happyfacesadface (Prod. razy)	Song Min-young	Fail	Fail	Fail	Pass
N/A	Castle J	Fail	Fail	Fail	Fail
N/A	Win	Fail	Fail	Fail	Fail
2CHA BEAT (Prod. sesame)	Shin Hyong-jun	Pass	Pass	Pass	Pass
PLAZMA (Prod. sesame)	Sokodomo	Pass	Fail	Fail	Fail
Jo Gwang-il - Acrobat	Jo Gwang-il	Fail	Pass	Pass	Pass
Wake Up (Remix) (Prod. HDBL4CK)	kitsyojii	Pass	Pass	Pass	Pass
Dripping Sweat (Prod. 24corazones Beats)	San E	Pass	Fail	Pass	Pass
N/A	Lil Sunder11	Fail	Fail	Fail	Pass
N/A	Bae Jae-won	Fail	Pass	Pass	Pass
Mudd The Student - Mudd got the bass	Mudd The Student	Pass	Pass	Pass	Pass
N/A	Eugene Cha	Fail	Fail	Fail	Fail
N/A	Oh Soo-jung	Fail	Fail	Fail	Fail
N/A	James An	Pass	Pass	Pass	Fail
N/A	Kanto	Fail	Pass	Fail	Fail
N/A	Marvel J	Fail	Fail	Fail	Fail
N/A	Raphael	Fail	Fail	Pass	Fail
N/A	NOA	Pass	Fail	Pass	Pass
N/A	Yanu	Pass	Pass	Pass	Pass
N/A	Yonge Jaundice	Pass	Pass	Pass	Pass
N/A	Kim Dong-wook	Fail	Fail	Fail	Pass
N/A	Kim Hyeon-jik	Pass	Fail	Pass	Fail
N/A	Park Yu-bin	Pass	Fail	Pass	Pass
N/A	Son Yeong-dae	Fail	Fail	Fail	Pass
N/A	Son Jeong-hyun	Fail	Fail	Pass	Fail
N/A	A-Chess	Fail	Pass	Pass	Pass
N/A	Ohiorabbit	Pass	Fail	Pass	Pass
N/A	Lee Da-eun	Fail	Pass	Fail	Fail
N/A	Jang Rae-hyeok	Fail	Fail	Pass	Pass
N/A	Ji Chanel	Fail	Pass	Pass	Fail
N/A	Choi Jun-pyo	Fail	Pass	Pass	Fail
N/A	Choo Hyun-seung	Fail	Fail	Pass	Fail
N/A	Posadic	Fail	Fail	Pass	Fail

Selected rappers in the revival round

Contestant	60-seconds beat rap	Revival round	Revived to the next round/ eliminated
Gwabtopal	Fail	Fail	Eliminated
Pullik	Fail	Pass	Revived
Yankie	Fail	Pass	Revived
Basick	Fail	Pass	Revived
Implanted Kid	Fail	Fail	Eliminated
Mac Kidd	Fail	Pass	Revived
Yoboy	Fail	Fail	Eliminated
Park Su-hwan	Fail	Pass	Revived

Received a "pass" or "all pass" from the producer team(s).
Received a "fail" from producer team(s). If the contestant received an "all fail", they were eliminated from the show.

=== Round three: 1-on-1 battle ===
The remaining 56 contestants will be paired up for the 1-on-1 battle. Prior to this round, contestants with an "all pass" received a "top" sticker, while those with 2 or 3 passes received a "middle" sticker, those with 1 pass received a "bottom" sticker, and those that were revived from the revival round received a "brink of elimination" sticker. MC Kim Jin-pyo then presented cards representing one contestant. When picked, the contestant will choose his/her partner. They will perform in front of the producer teams with a beat or song from the producer teams. After the performance, the producer teams will evaluate their performance. The winning contestant will advance to the next round and gets to choose the producer team he/she will join. The losing contestant will get a chance to be revived via "producer pass" where at least one of the producer teams may decide to let the contestant advance to the next round and make him/her choose the team he/she wants to join. If neither of the producer teams press the "producer pass" button after 10 seconds, the losing contestant is eliminated from the show. In case of a tie, a sudden-death tie-breaker will be performed, where both contestants will once again prepare a set performance using another producer beat or song to determine the winner. If the first sudden death tie-breaker still ends in a tie, another round of sudden-death tie-breaker will be held, this time both contestants will pick another producer beat or song and perform it on the spot. If both contestants still end up in a tie after two sudden death tie-breakers, one of the producer teams must give one or both contestants the "producer pass" to advance into the next round. A total of 33 contestants advanced to the next round.

Producer Beat	Contestant	Producer Pass Used	Producer Team initially selected to join	vs.	Contestant	Producer Pass Used	Producer Team initially selected to join
Ash Island - Grand Prix feat. Beenzino (Prod. Toil)	Northfacegawd	No	Team Gray x Mino	vs.	Choi Sang-hyeon	No	Eliminated
Slom - Leave Me	Unofficialboyy	Yes	Team Zion T x Slom	vs.	Koonta	No	Team Yumdda x Toil
Dynamic Duo - J.O.T.S feat. Nafla (Prod. Gaeko)	365lit	No	Team Yumdda x Toil	vs.	Yanu	No	Eliminated
Leellamarz - Hey Lady (아가씨) feat. Zene The Zilla, Mushvenom (Prod. Toil)	Ourealgoat	No	Unknown	vs.	Don Mills	Yes	Unknown
Unknown	Lee Da-eun	No	Unknown	vs.	Bae Jae-won	No	Eliminated
Unknown	Lil Sunder11	No	Eliminated	vs.	JP	No	Unknown
Unknown	Kim Hyeon-jik	No	Unknown	vs.	Choi Hwan-hee	No	Eliminated
pH-1 - Blame My Circle feat. Justhis, Owen (Prod. Gray)	Geegooin	No	Team Mino x Gray	vs.	Son Jeong-hun	No	Eliminated
Dynamic Duo - J.O.T.S feat. Nafla (Prod. Gaeko)	Anandelight	No	Unknown	vs.	Yankie	No	Eliminated
Unknown	Choo Hyun-seung	No	Unknown	vs.	Son Yeong-dae	No	Eliminated
Code Kunst - Born From the Blue feat. Justhis (Prod. Code Kunst) pH-1 - Blame My Circle feat. Justhis, Owen (Prod. Gray) Dynamic Duo - J.O.T.S feat. Nafla (Prod. Gaeko)	Jo Gwang-il (Note: tie after two sudden-death performances)	Yes	Team Code Kunst x Gaeko	vs.	A-Chess	Yes	Team Yumdda x Toil
Slom - Birds of Colorado	Sokodomo	No	Team Zion T x Slom	vs.	Jamezz	No	Eliminated
Dynamic Duo - J.O.T.S feat. Nafla (Prod. Gaeko)	Choi Jun-pyo	No	Eliminated	vs.	Khakii	No	Unknown
Slom - Birds of Colorado	Mudd The Student	No	Team Gray x Mino	vs.	Jeong Eui-yeong	No	Eliminated
Slom - Birds of Colorado	San-E	No	Unknown	vs.	Posadic	No	Eliminated
Crazy - (Prod. Gray)	Kim Dong-wook	No	Eliminated	vs.	Basick	No	Team Gaeko x Code Kunst
Crazy - (Prod. Gray)	Be'O	No	Team Gray x Mino	vs.	Kanto	No	Eliminated
Crazy - (Prod. Gray) Ambition - (Prod. Gray) Code Kunst - Bronco feat. Bassagong, BLNK, Jaedal (Prod. Code Kunst)	Since	Yes	Unknown	vs.	Hwang Ji-sang	Yes	Unknown
Unknown	Kitsyojii	No	Unknown	vs.	Park Yu-bin	No	Eliminated
Unknown	Pullik	No	Unknown	vs.	Nakmin Choi	No	Eliminated
Unknown	Shin Yong-jun	No	Eliminated	vs.	Noa	No	Unknown
Unknown	Ahn Byeong-woong	No	Unknown	vs.	Park Su-hwan	No	Eliminated
Unknown	Tabber	No	Unknown	vs.	Ji Chanel	No	Eliminated
Unknown	James An	Yes	Unknown	vs.	Song Min-young	Yes	Unknown
Unknown	Jang Rae-hyeok	No	Eliminated	vs.	Ohiorabbit	No	Unknown
Unknown	Kang Seong-sik	No	Eliminated	vs.	Raphael	No	Unknown
Unknown	Blase	No	Unknown	vs.	Sycho	No	Eliminated
Unknown	Yonge Jaundice	No	Unknown	vs.	Mac Kidd	No	Eliminated

Indicates the winning contestant and advances to the next round
Received a "Producer Pass" and advanced to the next round.
Eliminated from the show after the producers did not use the "Producer Pass"

=== Round four: producer performances and team rapper casting ===
The remaining 33 contestants will undergo team casting in order to be matched by the producer team he/she wants to join in. Prior to this round, the producers will have special performances to convince them to join their teams. The contestant will vote for the best performance. The winning producer team will get to pick their first contestant to join their team. Each contestant will then make one last appeal by doing a set performance in front of the producers in order to convince their desired producer team to accept him/her. The contestants then will each have three minutes to listen to each producer team's appeal to join their team and then decide which producer team room he/she will enter. Each producer team will call in the contestants in their producer team room and will select contestants that will form their 5-member team. The remaining contestants that were not called in may still have a chance to be picked by another producer team if their team does not have 5 members. If neither producer team picks the contestant, he/she is eliminated from the show.

Performance Ranking	Producer Team	Songs Performed
2	Team Gray x Mino	Trigger, Run Away, Mean Please, Pow, Martin 63
1	Team Zion T x Slom	Complex, Malla Gang, Na B Ya
3	Team Code Kunst x Gaeko	Cheap Talk, Fxxx Xx (Prod. Code Kunst), Feel So Good
4	Team Yummdda x Toil	To The Moon (Feat. Uneducated Kid) (Prod. Toil)

Indicates the producer team who receive the most votes from the contestants and will have a chance to pick the first contestant to join their team.

- The Italicized performance was performed for the first time and was released in all music platforms the next day

Rapper Appeal Performance + Team Casting

Producer Team	Contestants
Team Gaeko x Code Kunst	Ahn Byeong-woong
Team Gaeko x Code Kunst	Jo Gwang-il
Team Gaeko x Code Kunst	Kitsyojii
Team Gaeko x Code Kunst	Ourealgoat
Team Gaeko x Code Kunst	Raphael
Team Gaeko x Code Kunst	Since
Team Gaeko x Code Kunst	Tabber
Team Gray x Mino	Anandelight
Team Gray x Mino	Be'O
Team Gray x Mino	Blase
Team Gray x Mino	Geegooin
Team Gray x Mino	Kim Hyeon-jik
Team Gray x Mino	Mudd The Student (Note: Mudd The Student was initially picked to join Team Zion.T x Slom after they won best producer performance but refused the invitation and chose to join Team Gray x Mino.)
Team Gray x Mino	Pullik
Team Gray x Mino	Unofficialboyy
Team Gray x Mino	Yonge Jaundice
Team Yumdda x Toil	365lit
Team Yumdda x Toil	Basick
Team Yumdda x Toil	Hwang Ji-sang
Team Yumdda x Toil	Koonta
Team Yumdda x Toil	Lee Da-eun
Team Yumdda x Toil	Noa
Team Yumdda x Toil	San E
Team Yumdda x Toil	Song Min-young
Team Zion.T x Slom	A-Chess (Note: A-Chess initially chose to join Team Gray x Mino but was rejected and instead joined Team Zion T x Slom.)
Team Zion.T x Slom	Choo Hyun-seung
Team Zion.T x Slom	Don Mills (Note: Don Mills was picked to join Team Zion.T x Slom after Mudd The Student declined the invitation.)
Team Zion.T x Slom	James An
Team Zion.T x Slom	JP
Team Zion.T x Slom	Khakii
Team Zion.T x Slom	Northfacegawd
Team Zion.T x Slom	Ohiorabbit
Team Zion.T x Slom	Sokodomo

Indicates the contestants who were picked to join a team.
Indicates the contestants who were eliminated from the show after not being picked to join a team.

=== Round five: team song mission ===
Prior to this round, the producer teams meet up for their team bonding session to get to know their team members and to introduce the instrumental in which their members will write their lyrics and then perform in front of all the producer teams. At the end of each performance, the producers of the performing producer team will eliminate one contestant. Unlike previous seasons, the eliminated contestants will still be part of the official release version of the songs.

Producer Team	Contestants	Song	Eliminated Contestant
Team Zion T. x Slom	Don Mills, Khakii, Sokodomo, A-Chess, Northfacegawd	Trouble (Prod. Slom)	A-Chess
Team Yumdda x Toil	365lit, Basick, Hwang Ji-sang, Song Min-young, Koonta	Memories of You and Me (너와 나의 Memories) (ft. Yumdda) (Prod. Toil)	Song Min-young
Team Code Kunst x Gaeko	Since, Jo Gwang-il, Ahn Byeong-woong, Ourealgoat, Tabber	Wake Up (ft. Gaeko) (Prod. Code Kunst)	Ahn Byeong-woong
Team Gray x Mino	Geegooin, Anandelight, Be'O, Mudd The Student, Unofficialboyy	Breathe (쉬어) (ft. Mino) (Prod. Gray)	Unofficialboyy

Eliminated from the show. The contestant will still be part of the official release version of the song and will be included in this season's discography.

=== Round six: team diss battle ===
At the end of the team song mission, Team Gaeko x Code Kunst, who finished last in the producer stage performances, gets to choose the producer team they will face in this round, while the remaining two producer teams will face each other. There will be one-on-one diss battles for this round with previously eliminated contestants serving as members of the audience. They will vote after each diss battle with the votes accumulated to determine the winning producer team. The losing producer team will have its producers eliminate 1 contestant, while the winning producer team will have all members advance to the next round.

Team Yumdda x Toil vs. Team Zion T. vs. Slom
Beat	Team Yumdda x Toil	vs.	Beat	Team Zion T x Slom	Score
Alien Hip-Hop (Prod DMNT)	Koonta	vs.	KOONTA'S LIFE (Prod. Slom)	Sokodomo	N/A
Don Mills - 88	Hwang Ji-sang	vs.	Purple Smell (Prod. Slom) (Note: Contains sample from Kang Susie's "Purple Scent", which is the OST for Reply 1988)	Don Mills	N/A
Mobb Deep - Shook Ones (Part II) (Note: Basick also used this beat to rap during season 4's One Minute Rap round.)	Basick	vs.	Gangwon Land (Prod. Slom)	Khakii	N/A
Northfacegawd - Bokdukbang (복덕방) (Prod. 606 gus)	365lit	vs.	Finding Our Sound (Prod. Slom)	Northfacegawd	N/A
Team Gray x Mino vs. Team Gaeko x Code Kunst
Beat	Team Gray x Mino	vs.	Beat	Team Gaeko x Code Kunst	Score
Taebo (Note: Contains sample from Cho Hye-ryeon's Taebo diet workout video from 2003. Contestant Mudd the Student used wordplay as his opponent Tabber's rapper name rhymes with Taebo.) + Tyler, the Creator - Yonkers	Mudd the Student	vs.	Untitled (Prod. 2xxx, Taeyong)	Tabber	33-14
Soo-jin's Diss Song (Prod. pr!d3) (Note: Soo-jin is Since's first name.)	Geegooin	vs.	You Are a Squid, Right? (Prod. Noryangjin Fish Market) + The Beatnuts - Off the Books	Since	33-14
Goat (Prod. frozy)	Be'O	vs.	Jay Rock - Elbows	Ourealgoat	33-14
Gwang-il's Diss Song (Prod. Gray)	Anandelight	vs.	XXXTentacion - Look At Me!	Jo Gwang-il	33-14

Indicates the winning team, with all its contestants advancing to the next round.
Indicates the winning contestant.
Eliminated from the show.

=== Round seven: first live performances ===
Following the results of the team diss battles, winning teams will compete against each other and losing teams will compete against each other at the live performances. This season, there will not be a mic selection and all remaining contestants perform in this round. However, the "Death Match Rule" will be applied in which two contestants will perform together but one of them will be eliminated regardless if they win or lose their respective match-ups. The performance voting will also involve the live audience and online audiences who registered a week prior to the recording of the show. The winning producer team from the previous round will select two contestants that will perform together in the Death Match with the Producer(s) and/or special guest performer, while the other two contestants will have solo performances with the producers and/or special guest performer. The losing producer team will then select two contestants that will perform together in the Death Match with the Producer(s) and/or special guest performer, while the other contestant will perform with the producers and/or special guest performer. At the end of each performance, the online audience will first eliminate one contestant on each Death Match performance regardless of the result. Both the Live and online audience will then vote for the winner of each solo and Death Match match-ups with the total number of votes will be accumulated for each Producer Team. The winning Producer Team will have its members advance to the semi-finals. The Losing Producer Team will eliminate one more contestant in either the solo performance(s) or Death Match performance(s) while its remaining members advance to the semifinals. A total of 8 contestants advance to the semifinal round.

1st Live Performances
Producer Team	Contestant + Song	vs.	Producer Team	Contestant + Song	Total Live Audience + Online Votes (in ₩)	Eliminated Contestants (Decided by Online Voters)
Zion T x Slom	Sokodomo - Merry-Go-Round (회전목마) (ft. Zion T., Wonstein) (Prod. Slom)	vs.	Gaeko x Code Kunst	Jo Gwang-il - Thorn (가시) (ft. Gaeko, Justhis) (Prod. Code Kunst) (Note: The live performance features dance performance by Street Woman Fighter contestant and PROWDMON leader Monika.)	6,699,000 - 10,065,000	N/A
Zion T. x Slom	Don Mills & Khakii - Chameleon (카멜레온) (ft. Dbo, SUMIN) (Prod. SUMIN)	vs.	Gaeko x Code Kunst	Since & Tabber - Reset (ft. Gaeko, Kid Milli) (Prod. Code Kunst) (Note: Involves dance performance from Mr. Woo and friends.)	4,092,000 - 12,210,000	Khakii, Tabber
Yumdda x Toil	Hwang Ji-sang & 365lit - Wot Wot (모야모야) (ft. Queen Wa$abii) (Prod. Toil)	vs.	Gray x Mino	Geegooin & Anandelight - Press F5 (새로고침) (ft. Gray) (Prod. Gray) (Note: Involves dance performance from male dancers of YGX) (Note: F5 is the Refresh key on the keyboard. Hence the Korean title of the song .)	4,455,000 - 10,824,000	Hwang Ji-sang, Geegooin
Yumdda x Toil	Basick - Meeting is Easy, Parting is Hard (만남은 쉽고 이별은 어려워) (ft. Leellamarz) (Prod. Toil) (Note: The Live Performance features Toil's band with Toil on guitar.)	vs.	Gray x Mino	Mudd The Student - Moss (이끼) (ft. Bobby) (Prod. Mino) (Note: Involves dance performance from male dancers of YGX) (Note: Chorus contains vocals from Mino)	8,250,000 - 8,976,000	N/A
Yumdda x Toil	Koonta - Gganbu (깐부) (ft. Yumdda, Ash Island) (Prod. Toil)	vs.	Gray x Mino	Be'O - Limousine (리무진) (ft. Mino) (Prod. Gray) (Note: Live performance features band performance from Workmanship)	8,019,000 - 10,032,000	N/A

Producer Team	Total Team Performance Money Earned (in ₩)	vs.	Producer Team	Total Team Performance Money Earned (in ₩)	Eliminated Contestant (Decided by the Producers)
Zion T x Slom	10,791,000	vs.	Gaeko x Code Kunst	22,275,000	Don Mills
Yumdda x Toil	20,724,000	vs.	Gray x Mino	29,832,000	365lit

Indicates the winning performance and Producer crew who will advance to the semi-final round. Only one contestant in the winning team of the death match performances will advance to the next round as voted by the online voters.
Eliminated from the show. The contestant in the Death Match performances was also eliminated via online voters regardless of the match-up result. The losing team in each death match performances eliminated the second contestant either in the solo performances or death match performances as the producer's decision.

=== Round eight: semi-final performances ===
The eight semi-finalists paired up for a single elimination semi-final round. Each of them had a solo performance with a special guest performer(s). Prior to this round, MC Kim Jin-pyo showed 8 cards representing one contestant. He picked the first three cards in which the contestant picked their opponent for this round while the remaining two contestants competed against each other by default. Similar to the first live performances round, the same two-round voting process from the live and online audiences will occur in this round. However, the contestant who received more performance money after two rounds of voting against their match-up advanced to the finals, while the loser gets eliminated. In the event that all contestant(s) in one producer team lost their respective match-up(s), their entire team will be eliminated from the show.

Semi-final performances
Producer team	Contestant + song	vs.	Producer team	Contestant + song	Total live audience votes (in ₩)
Gray x Mino	Anandelight - High (높이) (ft. Lee Hi) (Prod. Gray)	vs.	Gaeko x Code Kunst	Since - Spring Rain (봄비) (Prod. Jumal of SMGS) (Note: The song was from her album Since '16 released in July 2021.) + FACE TIME (ft. Giriboy, pH-1) (Prod. Code Kunst) (Note: Features live dance performance from Street Woman Fighter's PROWDMON crew.)	10,045,000 - 13,079,000
Yummda x Toil	Koonta - Hopefully (바래) (ft. Jung-in) (Prod. Toil)	vs.	Gray x Mino	Mudd The Student: Dissonance (불협화음) (ft. AKMU); (Prod. Gray)	11,234,000 - 10,373,000
Yumdda x Toil	Basick - 08Basick (08베이식) (ft. Yumdda, Punchnello)	vs.	Gaeko x Code Kunst	Jo Gwang-il - Waterbomb (호우주의) (ft. Gaeko, Nucksal) (Prod. Code Kunst)	9,430,000 - 13,284,000
Zion T. x Slom	Sokodomo: BE! (ft. Paloalto, Lil Boi); (Prod. Slom, PEEJAY)	vs.	Gray x Mino	Be'O: MBTI (ft. Coogie, Loco); (Prod. Gray) (Note: For this song, MBTI means Million, Billion, Trillion, Illion)	8,815,000 - 13,694,000

Indicates the winning performance and will advance to the final round.
Eliminated from the show. If all contestant(s) in one team lost their respective match-ups, their entire producer team is eliminated as well from the show.

=== Round nine: final performances and special performances (live episode) ===
The final round will be televised live with partially pre-recorded performances as per strict compliance with the COVID-19 quarantine guidelines and live announcement of results and winners based from the votes from both the live audience (on-site evaluators) (40% of the votes) and live SMS voting (60% of the votes). Prior to the final episode, the show's production team opened the registration process for live audience participants in which the participant must be at least 19 years old and show proof that they received two doses of COVID-19 vaccine and/or a negative COVID-19 PCR test result 48 hours prior to the show. The four finalists will also meet up the night prior to the final round to determine their order of performances. The final round will be divided into two parts: the first part of the finals featured all four finalists each having a solo performance with a special guest performer(s). After all four finalists performed, a two-round voting process from both the live audience and live SMS voting will be held, and the performance ranking based on the live audience will be announced. In the second part of the finals, the four finalists will each had one last performance with the producer(s) and/or with a special guest performer(s), with the same two-round voting process and announcement of performance ranking held after the final performances. The contestant who earned the most cumulative performance money from both the pre-finals online evaluation team voters and live SMS voters in all two performances was the season's champion, receiving a prize money of ₩300,000,000, plus a Mini Cooper, album production support and a 1-month stay in an ultra-luxury hotel suite. The final episode also included special performances between the two final rounds from both semi-finalists and season 9 producers with their songs included in this season's official discography.

Round 1 of finals performances (solo performances)
Rank (from live audience votes)	Producer team	Contestant + song
3	Yumdda x Toil	Koonta - Double Up (ft. Yumdda, Layone, Mushvenom, The Quiett)
4	Gray x Mino	Be'O - Without You (네가 없는 밤) (ft. Ash Island) (Prod. Gray) (Note: Features live dance performance from YGX and live band performance from Workmanship.)
1	Gaeko x Code Kunst	Since - UP (UP해) (ft. Woo Won-jae, Jay Park) (Prod. Code Kunst) (Note: Features live dance performance from Nautyone, joony, Gonzo, Xion, shinobi and MostBadassAsian's (MBA) Yellow.D)
2	Gaeko x Code Kunst	Jo Gwang-il - Garion (가리온) (ft. Dynamic Duo) (Prod. Primary) (Note: Garion in Korean is a mystical white horse with a black mane. Jo Gwang-il also pays homage to legendary Korean Hip-hop group Garion in this song.) (Note: Features live dance from Nasty Shot dance crew.)

Special performances
Contestant(s)/producers	Song
Basick, Anandelight, Mudd The Student, Sokodomo	A Long Day (고생이 많아) (ft. Zion T.) (Prod. Fisherman)
Dynamic Duo, Paloalto, Giriboy, Justhis, Lil Boi, DJ Wegun	+82 (Prod. Dynamic Duo, THAMA)

Round 2 of finals performances (with producers)
Producer team	Contestant + song
Yumdda x Toil	Koonta - Timing (타이밍) (ft. Yumdda, BIG Naughty) (Prod. Toil) (Note: Live performance includes guitar performances from Toil.)
Gray x Mino	Be'O - Nothing (지나고 보면) (ft. Mino, Hwasa) (Prod. Gray)
Gaeko x Code Kunst	Since - Sign (ft. Mirani) (Prod. Code Kunst) (Note: Features live dance from Nasty Shot dance crew.) (Note: Live performance includes keyboard performance from Code Kunst.)
Gaeko x Code Kunst	Jo Gwang-il - Journey (쿠키영상) (ft. Gaeko, Hangzoo, Ailee) (Prod. Code Kunst) (Note: Features live dance from Nasty Shot dance crew.)

Combined finals results (part 1 & 2 performances)
Rank	Producer team	Contestant	Total live audience votes (in ₩) (live audience votes + live SMS votes)
1	Gaeko x Code Kunst	Jo Gwang-il	27,975,000 (14,075,000 from 1st round votes)
2	Gaeko x Code Kunst	Since	23,550,000 (11,575,000 from 1st round votes)
3	Gray x Mino	Be'O	20,550,000 (10,925,000 from 1st round votes)
4	Yumdda x Toil	Koonta	15,375,000 (7,800,000 from 1st round votes)

Indicates winner of Show Me the Money 10
Indicates the 1st runner-up
Indicates the 2nd and 3rd runner-ups

== Show Me the Money 10 Top 20 ==
Contestant	Producer team	Round 1	Round 2	Round 3	Round 4	Round 5	Round 6	Round 7	Semi-finals	Finals
Jo Gwang-il	Gaeko x Code Kunst	Pass	3-pass	Producer pass	Picked	Pass	LOST	Won/ Won	Won	Winner
Since	Gaeko x Code Kunst	Pass	3-pass	Producer pass	Picked	Pass	LOST	Won/ Won	Won	1ST; Runner-up
Be'O	Gray x Mino	Pass	All-pass	Won	Picked	Pass	Won	Won/ Won	Won	2ND; Runner-up
Koonta	Yumdda x Toil	Pass	All-pass	Won	Picked	Pass	Won	LOST/ LOST	Won	3RD; Runner-up
Anandelight	Gray x Mino	Pass	All-pass	Won	Picked	Pass	Won	Won/ Won	ELIM	
Mudd The Student	Gray x Mino	Pass	All-pass	Won	Picked	Pass	Won	Won/ Won	ELIM	
Sokodomo	Zion T x Slom	Pass	1-pass	Won	Picked	Pass	LOST	LOST/ LOST	ELIM	
Basick	Yummda x Toil	Pass	All-fail/ Revived	Won	Picked	Pass	Won	LOST/ LOST	ELIM	
Geegooin	Gray x Mino	Pass	All-pass	Won	Picked	Pass	Won	Won/ ELIM		
Tabber	Gaeko x Code Kunst	Pass	All-pass	Won	Picked	Pass	LOST	Won/ ELIM		
Hwang Ji-sang	Yumdda x Toil	Pass	All-pass	Producer pass	Picked	Pass	Won	LOST/ ELIM		
Don Mills	Zion T x Slom	Pass	All-pass	Producer pass	Picked	Pass	LOST	LOST/ ELIM		
365lit	Yumdda x Toil	Pass	3-pass	Won	Picked	Pass	Won	LOST/ ELIM		
Khakii	Zion T x Slom	Pass	1-pass	Won	Picked	Pass	LOST	Won/ ELIM		
Northfacegawd	Zion T x Slom	Pass	All-pass	Won	Picked	Pass	ELIM			
Ourealgoat	Gaeko x Code Kunst	Pass	3-pass	Won	Picked	Pass	ELIM			
Ahn Byeong-woong	Gaeko x Code Kunst	Pass	All-pass	Won	Picked	ELIM				
Unofficialboyy	Gray x Mino	Pass	All-pass	Producer pass	Picked	ELIM				
A-Chess	Zion T x Slom	Pass	3-pass	Producer pass	Picked	ELIM				
Song Min-young	Yumdda x Toil	Pass	1-pass	Producer pass	Picked	ELIM				

Winner The contestant won Show Me the Money 10.
Runner-up The contestant was the runner-up.
2nd or 3rd runners-up The contestants were either 2nd or 3rd runner-up.
All-pass The contestant received an all-pass in the 60-second beat rap round.
1 3 Pass The contestant received 3 pass and 1 fail in the 60-second beat rap round.
2 Pass The contestant received 2 pass and 2 fails in the 60-second beat rap round.
1 Pass The contestant received 1 pass and 3 fails in the 60-second beat rap round.
All fail/revived The contestant was initially eliminated after receiving an all-fail but was revived by the producer teams and advanced to the next round.
Won The contestant won his/her match-up during the 1-on-1 battle round.
Producer pass The contestant advanced to the next round after one of the producer teams used the producer pass during the 1-on-1 battle round.
Won The contestant's producer team won during the team diss battle.
Won The contestant won his/her solo performance in the 1st live performance and semifinal round.
Eliminated The contestant is eliminated from the show. The winning contestant in the death match performances is also eliminated after being voted out by the online voters.

Picked - Indicates that the contestant was selected to be part of a producer team.
