= Sokodomo =

South Korean rapper (born 2000)

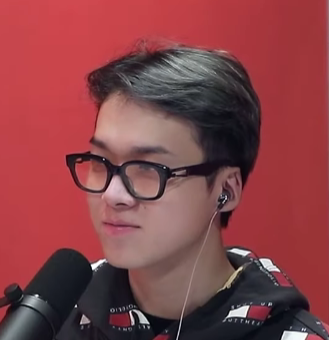
- Sokodomo in 2021

Background information
- Born: Yang Seung-ho; November 15, 2000 (age 25); Yeongdeungpo District, Seoul, South Korea
- Genres: Hip hop
- Occupations: Rapper; songwriter
- Years active: 2019–present
- Labels: Sony Music

Yang Seung-ho (Korean: 양승호; born November 15, 2000), known professionally as Sokodomo (Korean: 소코도모; stylized in all lowercase), is a South Korean rapper and songwriter. He first garnered attention when he appeared on High School Rapper 3 in 2019. He signed with Sony Music where released the extended plays WWW.III (2019) and ...---... (2021). In 2021, he appeared on Show Me the Money 10 where he released the single "Merry-Go-Round" which peaked at number one on the Gaon Digital Chart.

== Early life ==
Yang Seung-ho was born on November 15, 2000, in Yeongdeungpo District, Seoul, South Korea to a Korean father and Japanese mother. He lived in the United States when he was young and spent his teenage years in São Paulo and Rio de Janeiro. He graduated from Sunrin Internet High School.

His stage name "Sokodomo" means "Korean child" as it is a portmanteau of "South Korea" and "kodomo"(こども, Japanese word for child).

== Career ==
=== 2019–2020: High School Rapper 3 and signing to Sony Music ===
In February 2019, Sokodomo appeared on the rap competition TV show High School Rapper 3 where he first garnered attention. He released singles "Mirror", "U.F.O", "Freedumb" and "Global Extinction" on the show and finished in sixth place. In June 2019, he signed to Sony Music. In December 2019, he released his debut extended play WWW.III. In 2020, he was nominated for New Artist of the Year at the Korean Hip-hop Awards.

=== 2021–2022: Show Me the Money 10 and "Merry-Go-Round" ===
In 2021, Sokodomo appeared on the rap competition TV show Show Me the Money 10 where his released the single "Merry-Go-Round" featuring singers Zion.T and Wonstein. It peaked at number one on the Gaon Digital Chart and became his most successful single. He finished the show in the top 8.

== Discography ==
=== Extended plays ===
Title	Details	Peak chart position
Title	Details	KOR
WWW.III	Released: December 6, 2019; Label: Sony Music; Format: CD, Digital download	78
...---...	Released: May 11, 2021; Label: Sony Music; Format: CD, digital download	—

=== Singles ===
Title	Year	Peak chart position	Certification	Album
Title	Year	KOR	Certification	Album
"Mirror" (거울; Geoul) (with Untell)	2019	95	—N/a	High School Rapper 3 Team Batte Part 1
"U.F.O" (featuring Uneducated Kid)	2019	—	—N/a	High School Rapper 3 Team Battle Part 3
"Freedumb" (featuring Haon)	2019	98	—N/a	High School Rapper 3 Semi Final
"Global Extinction" (지구멸망; Jigumyeolmang) (featuring Kirin)	2019	—	—N/a	High School Rapper 3 Final
"Go Home" (Feat. LaPamasaka)	2019	—	—N/a	WWW.III
"Snow" (with JP)	2019	—	—N/a	Non-album singles
"LOL"	2020	—	—N/a	Non-album singles
"Sugar" (with Hitchhiker)	2020	—	—N/a	Non-album singles
"Genda Phool" (with Badshah, Payal Dev)	2020	—	—N/a	Non-album singles
"Trouble" (with Don Mills, Northfacegawd, Khakii, A-Chess)	2021	7	—N/a	Show Me the Money 10 Episode 1
"Merry-Go-Round" (회전목마; Hoejeonmongma) (featuring Zion.T and Wonstein)	2021	1	KMCA: Platinum	Show Me the Money 10 Episode 2
"Be!" (featuring Paloalto and Lil Boi)	2021	38	—N/a	Show Me the Money 10 Semi Final
"A Long Day" (고생이 많아; Gosaengi mana) (featuring Zion.T, with Basick, Anandelight and Mudd the Student)	2021	169	—N/a	Show Me the Money 10 Final
"Scar" (with 24kGoldn)	2022	—	—N/a	Non-album single

== Filmography ==
=== TV ===
Year	Title	Role	Ref.
2019	High School Rapper 3	Contestant (Top 6)	
2021	Show Me the Money 10	Contestant (Top 8)	

== Awards and nominations ==
Name of the award ceremony, year presented, nominee of the award, award category and the result of the nomination
Award	Year	Nominee	Category	Result	Ref.
Korean Hip-hop Awards	2020	Himself	New Artist of the Year	Nominated	
Korean Hip-hop Awards	2022	"Merry-Go-Round"	Hip-hop Track of the Year	Nominated	
Korean Hip-hop Awards	2022	"MM"	Music Video of the Year	Nominated	
Melon Music Awards	2022	Himself	Top 10	Nominated	
Melon Music Awards	2022	"Merry-Go-Round"	Song of the Year	Nominated	
