= Faangs =

Canadian singer-songwriter (born 1998)

- Also known as: Faangs; Charlie
- Born: Melissa Faith Storwick; November 13, 1998 (age 27)
- Origin: Calgary, Alberta, Canada
- Genre: Pop
- Occupations: Singer; songwriter; actress
- Instruments: Vocals, piano
- Years active: 2011–present
- Labels: Westsonic Music Inc.; Teeth Out; Warner Music Canada

Melissa Faith Storwick (born November 13, 1998), known professionally as Faangs (formerly Charlie), is a Canadian singer-songwriter and actress. She was the winner of The Next Star season 4, and starred as Piper Gray in YTV's Some Assembly Required (2014–2016).

Storwick now records music under the name Faangs and has written songs for several artists, like Ashnikko, Fifty Fifty and Rico Nasty.

== Early life ==
Storwick stated in an interview for The Next Star that she is inspired by all types of music. Growing up in Calgary, Storwick was obsessed with watching performers on TV, always ready to entertain strangers on trips to the grocery store with her mom. She was encouraged to take up hobbies to keep her mind active outside of school and was put into lessons to learn the trumpet and violin, eventually focussing on the piano above all, dropping the tuition and teaching herself by ear. She started to sing as she was playing, mum and dad constantly reaffirming her practice as leisure time. Eventually she was allowed to take up musical theatre in school, the challenge of combining singing, acting and dancing speaking to her burgeoning desire to entertain. Her musical heroes were Whitney Houston, The Beatles, Billie Joe Armstrong, Christina Aguilera and Freddie Mercury. Storwick grew up in Calgary, Alberta with her family. She has two sisters, Annie and Amanda Storwick and one brother, Jack Storwick. Charlie used to attend the Calgary Waldorf School. She now lives in Los Angeles, California as FAANGS.

== Career ==
=== 2011: The Next Star ===
In May 2011, after hearing about the auditions from her classmates, she chose to audition for The Next Star because she wanted to "take it to the next level", which scared her parents. Out of thousands of young hopefuls, Storwick made it to the Top 16. She later made it to the Top 6, along with contestants Parker Schmidt, Milly Benzu, Shania Fillmore, April Llave, and JD Meeboer.

Throughout the season, Storwick performed a total of 12 songs. (One being her audition, and two being music videos) The first song she performed was "Stuttering" by Fefe Dobson. After meeting her music producer, Zubin Thakkar, they both created her song titled "Good as Gone". Along with the rest of the top six, she performed a preview of her song. She later performed a battle song with contestant Parker; herself with "Sweet Escape" and Parker with "Grenade". Then for the group battle, she performed "Whip My Hair"; with April and Parker v.s. "I Love Rock and Roll" performed by Shania, JD and, Milly. Further on in the series, she performed "My Guy" for the Motown segment of the season. Storwick also performed a Motown song with contestants Shania and April titled "Baby Love". At the finale after she won, she performed Jessie J's "Price Tag".

Towards the end of the season, Storwick also created a music video for "Good As Gone", and created a group music video, "Turn It Up Up Up" with her and the other top 6 members. The video for "Good as Gone" ranked at number 21 on the MuchMusic #Trending rates of 2011 countdown. At the finale, it was announced that she won season 4 of The Next Star.

In 2012, Storwick signed with Warner Music Canada and released the single "Glitter in the Sky". The music video made its first appearance on Monday, July 16 on YTV at 10:30 AST. Her other song titled "Paper Heart" was also released on July 16.

Storwick is also the first ever contestant on The Next Star to get one million views on YouTube.

=== 2014–2017: Some Assembly Required and Bazaar ===
Right after she finished The Next Star, she wanted to expand her career into acting. It was announced in 2013 that Storwick would be playing the role of Piper Gray in the YTV show, Some Assembly Required. The show premiered January 6, 2014, and ended on June 6, 2016.

In 2015, she released her formal debut single "Ghosts". The song debuted and peaked at number 87 on the Canadian Hot 100. The song also hit the Top 30 on the Top 40 radio, Hot AC and AC radio charts. "Ghosts" was released through Vancouver's Westsonic Music, and amassed over 1.2 million streams on Spotify. The song was inspired by a real life experience. She stated, "I was playing my keyboard and then I heard a loud noise. I got a little startled, and I was thinking what happens after that and then I let my imagination run wild." She released her second single titled, "Kiss Kiss Bang Bang" under the label in September 2016. In 2016, she was named as one of the 25 acts on Macy's iHeartRadio Rising Star contest. On October 10, 2017, she released her debut album, Bazaar.

She was invited to a writing workshop organised by Canadian collection society SOCAN, and it was there that she met British producer BHAV who invited her back to the UK for further sessions after her 18th birthday. Storwick travelled to Berlin for writing sessions with German quartet Hitimpulse, living in their studio for four months, working on songs. Storwick then ended up signing with Sony in Germany under the supervision of the European president Daniel Lieberberg.

=== 2018–present: Faangs ===
Storwick moved to Los Angeles and began writing songs for other artists and on her new persona Faangs, a name inspired by the vicious city she now called home. She released her debut single under the name Faangs titled "Huh" on October 23, 2020, which was followed up by four more singles until the release of her debut album Teeth Out on November 12, 2021. She co-wrote the song, "Barbie Dreams", for the 2023 film, Barbie.

== Filmography ==
Year	Title	Role	Notes
2011	The Next Star	Herself	Top 6; winner
2011	MuchMusic	Herself	Interview
2012	YTV	Herself	Interview; The Zone
2014–2016	Some Assembly Required	Piper Gray	Lead Role

== Discography ==
=== Albums ===
List of albums with selected details
Title	Details
Bazaar	Released: October 10, 2017; Label: Westsonic Music Inc.; Formats: Digital download
Teeth Out	Released: November 12, 2021; Label: Columbia Local; Formats: Digital download

=== Extended plays ===
List of EPs with selected details
Title	Details
I Died in LA	Released: September 9, 2022; Label: Teeth Out; Formats: Digital download

=== Singles ===
==== As Charlie ====
List of singles as Charlie, with selected chart positions
Title	Year	Peak chart positions				Album
Title	Year	CAN	CAN AC	CAN CHR	CAN HAC	Album
"Good as Gone"	2011	—	—	—	—	The Next Star: Season 4
"Turn It Up Up" (with April Llave, JD Meeboer, Milly Benzu, Parker Schmidt, Shania Fillmore)	2011	—	—	—	—	The Next Star: Season 4
"Glitter in the Sky"	2012	—	—	—	—	Non-album singles
"Paper Heart" (featuring Nate Hall)	2012	—	—	—	—	Non-album singles
"Ghosts"	2015	87	28	24	30	Bazaar
"Kiss Kiss Bang Bang"	2016	—	—	—	—	Bazaar
"—" denotes releases that did not chart.

==== As lead artist ====
List of singles as Faangs, showing year released and album name
Title	Year	Album
"Ceiling"	2018	Non-album singles
"Love Fast Die Young"	2018	Non-album singles
"Huh"	2020	Teeth Out
"Rich Kid$"	2021	Teeth Out
"Relapse"	2021	Teeth Out
"I Don't Care"	2021	Teeth Out
"I'm a Little"	2021	Teeth Out
"I'd Hate Me Too"	2022	Non-album single
"Voicemail"	2022	I Died in LA
"Kate Moss"	2022	I Died in LA
"Beep! Beep!"	2023	TBA

==== As featured artist ====
List of singles as featured artist, with selected chart positions, certifications, showing year released and album name
Title	Year	Peak chart positions		Certifications	Album
Title	Year	NOR	GER	Certifications	Album
"That's You" (Brandon Taylor featuring Faangs)	2019	—	—		Bankview
"Shy" (Karate Kactus featuring Faangs)	2019	—	—		Non-album singles
"Don't Talk to Me" (N.F.I. featuring Faangs and Riton)	2020	—	—		Non-album singles
"Sicko" (Felix Jaehn featuring Gashi and Faangs)	2020	—	42	BVMI: Gold; IFPI Austria: Gold	Non-album singles
"Disconnected" (Politik featuring Faangs)	2023	—	—		Non-album singles
"Heartbreak Melody" (Alan Walker featuring Faangs)	2025	94	—		Non-album singles
"—" denotes releases that did not chart.

== Songwriting credits ==
Title	Year	Artist(s)	Album	Written with
"It's Alright"	2018	Mother Mother	Dance and Cry	Ryan Guldemond
"Sick Thoughts"	2019	Lewis Blissett	Non-album single	James "Yami" Bell, Finn Keane, Lewis Blissett
"We Got This"	2019	Delhi 2 Dublin	We Got This	Gavin Brown, Kevin Maher, Sanjay Seran, Tariq Hussain, Tarun Nayar
"Halloweenie II: Pumpkin Spice"	2019	Ashnikko	Non-album single	Ashton Casey, Oscar Scheller
"Say It Ain't So"	2020	Bishara & Leia	Non-album single	James "Yami" Bell, Timothy Caifeldt, Samuel Kvist, Markus Sepehrmanesh
"Tragic" (featuring Amber Van Day)	2020	The Him	Non-album single	Steven Berghuijs, Jeroen Kerstens, Jonas Kalisch, Jeremy Chacon, Henrik Meinke, Alexsej Vlasenko, Amanda Cygnaeus
"Cry" (featuring Grimes)	2020	Ashnikko	Demidevil	Ashton Casey, Ebenezer Fabiyi, Claire Boucher
"Own It"	2020	Rico Nasty	Nightmare Vacation	Maria-Cecilia Simone Kelly, Vincent van den Ende, Camden Bench, Amit Nagra
"Outta My Control" (featuring ØZI)	2022	Koda Kumi	Heart	Bhavik Pattani
"Pregame"	2022	Niki DeMar	Non-album single	Nicola DeMartino, Robert Grimaldi, Trevor Muzzy
"Lights Out"	2023	Bludnymph	Non-album single	Henry Walter, Kya Hansen
"Barbie Dreams" (featuring Kaliii)	2023	Fifty Fifty	Barbie the Album	James Harris, Janet Jackson, JBach, Kaliya Ashley Ross, Marc Sibley, Mike Caren, Nathan Cunningham, Nicholaus Joseph Williams, Randall Hammers, Terry Lewis, Tramaine Winfrey
“Squeak”	2026	Bludnymph	Non-album single	Faangs, Kya Hansen, Henry Russell Walter
“Sonder”	2026	Le Sserafim	Pureflow Pt. 1	Anthony Watts, B. Lewis, Faangs, Jeon Ji-eun, Huh Yunjin, Youra (Full8loom), Score (13), Megatone (13), J14 (Full8loom), Kim Soo-ji, Jin-li (Full8loom)

== Music videos ==
Year	Title	Artist	Notes
2011	"Good as Gone"	Charlie	#21 on MuchMusic Countdown
2011	"Turn It Up Up Up"	The Next Star top 6	Aired on CMT as #69 in top 100
2012	"Glitter in the Sky"	Charlie	
2015	"Ghosts"	Charlie	
2016	"Kiss Kiss Bang Bang"	Charlie	
2018	"Ceiling"	Faangs	
2019	"Shy"	Karate Kactus featuring Faangs	
2020	"Sicko"	Felix Jaehn featuring Gashi and Faangs	
2020	"Huh"	Faangs	
2021	"Rich Kid$"	Faangs	
2021	"Relapse"	Faangs	
2021	"I Don't Care"	Faangs	
2021	"Don't Blame Me"	Faangs	
2021	"Diamond Bitch"	Faangs	
2022	"I'm a Little"	Faangs	
2025	"Heartbreak Melody"	Alan Walker featuring Faangs	
