= Plot Twist (EP) =

2025 extended play by AtHeart

- Standard edition cover

EP by AtHeart
- Released: August 13, 2025
- Length: 12:50
- Languages: English; Korean
- Labels: Titan; Imperial; Dreamus

Plot Twist is the debut extended play (EP) by the South Korean girl group AtHeart. It was released through American entertainment agency Titan Content on August 13, 2025. After finalizing the group, they released their pre-debut song "Good Girl (AtHeart)" which was included in its track listing, consisting of five songs in total. The project was co-produced by Jack Laboz, Jonah Shy, Rykeyz, John King, Sermstyle, and Space Primates. Commercially, it debuted at number eleven in South Korea (Circle Album Chart) and has sold over 20,000 copies in the country.

Another music video for its title track was released which involved singer Choi Soo-young, appearing in a teaser trailer. While preparing for their EP debut, group member Aurora was absent due to health-related problems. AtHeart would then performed several of their songs on multiple local music programs. They also became one of the first K-pop groups to debut early on U.S. television, after appearing on morning show Good Day New York and later spoke with American afternoon host JoJo Wright for radio station 102.7 KIIS FM.

== Background and content ==
"They all grew up loving K-pop music, also singing and dancing [which] they were ready when we first found them [and] make sure we give them the necessary education, not necessarily on singing and dancing but also on the mental training. [...] With all these interesting groups coming out recently, I thought this was the perfect time, the right time, to debut this girl group."

— Katie Kang, explaining her first thoughts developing AtHeart to The Hollywood Reporter.

Nikki Semin-Han co-founded American entertainment agency Titan Content on November 28, 2023; after scouting talent in prominent locations, the agency announced on July 16, 2024, that Michi and Sorin were the first members for upcoming South Korean girl group AtHeart. Maeil Business Newspaper were perplexed for this decision, because individuals and their social media accounts are kept confidential until the group is finalized. Revealing their identities simultaneously was unconventional. Three more members: Katelyn, Seohyeon, and Aurora were later introduced on November 12.

Although the group became a five-piece ensemble, the agency had more members to recruit their debut. Three months later, the seven-member group was established, unveiling Nahyun, Arin, and Bome on February 21, 2025. Teen Vogue interviewed them showcasing their influences and strengths; Sorin was later removed from publication as she is no longer debuting with AtHeart. Titan Content subsequently partnered with Imperial Music, a division from Republic Records, that "makes them the ideal partner for this venture." Dreamus also announced they will exclusively distribute any music release from AtHeart, along with merchandising in South Korea.

== Promotion and release ==
AtHeart started to upload teasers showcasing their pre-debut song and uploaded a music video titled "Good Girl (AtHeart)" through video sharing platform YouTube on March 14, 2025. It was soon released worldwide digitally for music download and streaming on May 29 at 1 p.m. Korean Standard Time (UTC+9:00). A month later, AtHeart confirmed on July 10 they would release their debut extended play (EP) in the upcoming month. While promoting the project, the next day it was announced that Aurora was excluded due to health problems.

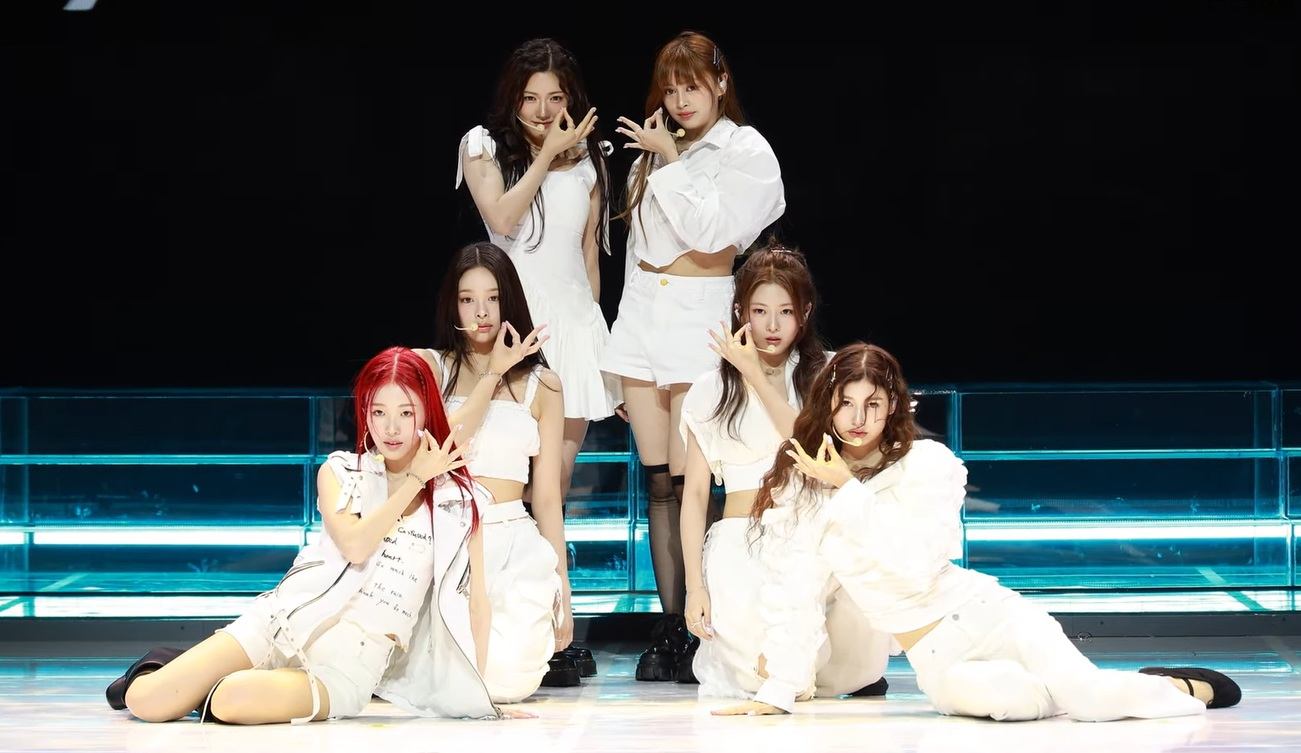
AtHeart (excluding Aurora) debuting their showcase at Blue Square, located in the Yongsan District

Plot Twist was later released globally on August 13 at 6 p.m., which includes five songs in its tracklist along with their pre-debut single. A teaser trailer for its title track was uploaded, with singer Choi Soo-young appearing as a mentor. The same day, they made their first showcase at Blue Square, located in the Yongsan District. AtHeart soon would make their first South Korean televised performances through multiple music programs, such as M Countdown, Show! Music Core, and Inkigayo.

Then, an English-language rendition of "Plot Twist" was released on October 10, along with two remixed versions from Cat Dealers and Tsu Nami at the end of the month. Titan Content launched them a promotional tour in the United States, in order to accelerate the group onto the global market. AtHeart later performed and were interviewed by Good Day New York on November 21, becoming one of the first K-pop groups to debut early on U.S. television. They had also appeared on radio station 102.7 KIIS FM with American afternoon host JoJo Wright, discussing their time in the United States and meeting fans from overseas.

== Track listing ==
Standard edition
No.	Title	Writer(s)	Producer(s)	Length
1.	"Plot Twist"	Bang Hye-hyun; Jo Yoon-kyung	Jack Laboz; Jonah Shy	2:06
2.	"Push Back"	Choi Bora; Na Jeongah; Yun Soyoung	Rykeyz	3:00
3.	"Dot Dot Dot..."	Jo Yoon-kyung	John King	2:53
4.	"Knew Me"	Hei Kim	Sermstyle	2:22
5.	"Good Girl (AtHeart)"	Danke	Space Primates	2:08
Total length:				12:50

== Charts ==
Chart (2025)	Peak position
South Korean Albums (Circle)	11

== Release history ==
List of release dates and formats
Region	Date	Format(s)	Labels	Ref.
South Korea	August 13, 2025	CD; digital download; streaming	Titan; Imperial; Dreamus	
Japan	August 13, 2025	CD; digital download; streaming	Titan; Imperial; Dreamus	
United States	August 13, 2025	CD; digital download; streaming	Titan; Imperial; Dreamus	
