= Space Primates =

Producer & DJ duo

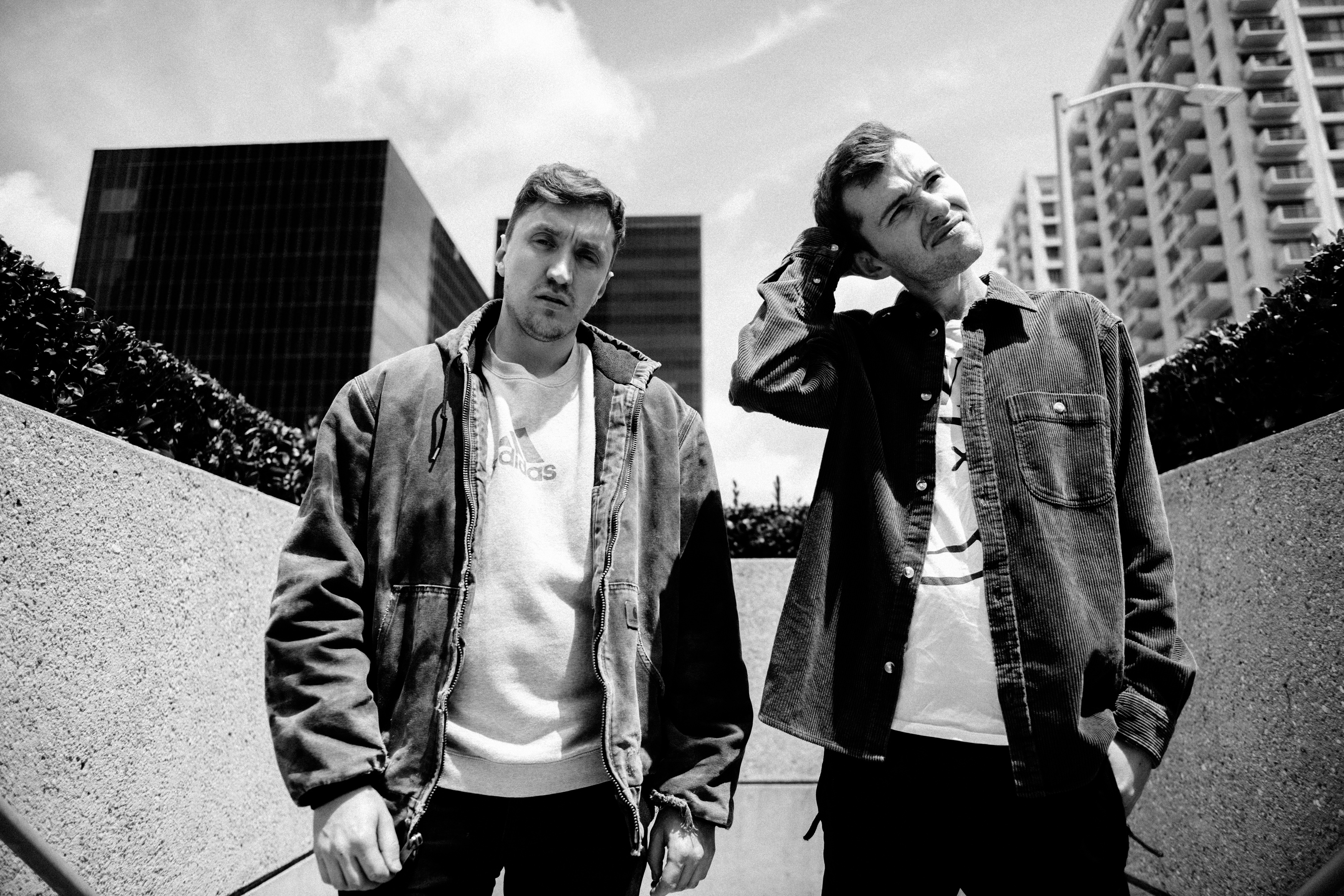

Background information
- Genres: Electronic; pop
- Occupations: Producer; songwriter; DJs
- Years active: 2013–present
- Members: Nathan Cunningham; Marc Sibley
- Website: spaceprimates.com

Space Primates are a DJ, songwriting, and production duo from England consisting of Marc Sibley and Nathan Cunningham. They have made records with artists such as Katy Perry, David Guetta, DJ Snake, Chris Brown, Maluma, Flo Rida, Ozuna, Ciara, DVBBS, Gashi, Enrique Iglesias, Upsahl and many more. Their music has been featured in shows and films such as Baywatch, The Secret Life of Pets 2, Kevin Hart's What Now, The Mindy Project and on the NFL. In 2019 they were nominated for a Daytime Emmy for their work on the Green Eggs and Ham main title. In 2023 they won a Grammy award for their work on Barbie the Album.

== History ==
Space Primates met in 2010. Throughout college they both played Guitar in wedding bands, and for a range of acts such as Krept and Konan, Sneakbo, and Rama Katani. They both took an interest in music production during their time at college and began collaborating. Shortly after leaving college they entered a remix competition on Indaba Music for Capital Cities which they won. Shortly after they had their first major release with "Whip It!" by LunchMoney Lewis which charted globally. Following on from this they wrote and produced The X Factor runner ups Reggie 'n' Bollie's debut single "New Girl (song)". In 2021 they produced and wrote the Alesso and Katy Perry song When I'm Gone which has since been certified gold and platinum in multiple countries. In 2023 they produced and wrote the Fifty Fifty and Kaliii song Barbie Dreams for the Barbie (film) soundtrack.

== Artist career ==
2018 saw Space Primates release their debut record as artists, "My Life" which has seen over three million streams across all platforms. The follow-up "Fade Out" with Norwegian artists Seeb and Olivia O'Brien has amassed over 40 million streams. In 2021 they collaborated with Dvbbs and Gashi for the single "Say It". In 2022 they released 'Memory' with Cheat Codes (DJs).

== Discography ==
=== Production and songwriting credits ===
| Year | Song | Artist | Single/Album | Credit | Accolades |
|---|---|---|---|---|---|
| 2014 | One Minute More | Capital Cities | Remix | Producer | |
| 2015 | Whip It! | LunchMoney Lewis | Single | Producer, Songwriter | 3× Platinum- Australia #11 #23 Germany #4 Belgium |
| 2016 | New Girl | Reggie 'n' Bollie | Single | Producer, Songwriter | #1 Ghana #4 UK #8 Scotland #71 Ireland |
| 2016 | What Happened To | Kevin Hart | Album | Producer, Songwriter | |
| 2016 | Attention | Sweet California | Album | Producer, Songwriter | Platinum - Spain #1 Spain |
| 2017 | R U | Niki & Gabi | Single | Producer, Songwriter | |
| 2017 | Problems | SonReal | Single | Producer, Songwriter | #50 Canada |
| 2017 | Xxpen$ive | Erika Jayne | Single | Producer, Songwriter | |
| 2017 | What You Waitin For | Breyan Isaac & Space Primates | Baywatch Movie | Producer, Songwriter | |
| 2017 | Disrespectful | Gashi | Single | Producer, Songwriter | Silver - UK, Gold - Canada |
| 2017 | Turn Me Down | Gashi | Single | Producer, Songwriter | |
| 2017 | Fool | Fitz and The Tantrums | Single | Producer, Songwriter | #19 US Adult #34 US Rock |
| 2017 | Hola | Flo Rida | Single | Producer, Songwriter | #41 US |
| 2018 | For Real | Zookëper x Goshfather | Single | Vocal Producer, Songwriter | |
| 2018 | mama i'm so sorry... | Goldn | Single | Producer, Songwriter | |
| 2018 | My Life | Space Primates | Single | Producer, Songwriter | #3 US Viral Charts #7 Global Viral Charts |
| 2018 | Sometimes It Rains in L.A | The Vamps | Album | Producer, Songwriter | Gold - UK # 2 UK Album Charts |
| 2018 | Blame It On Love ft. Madison Beer | David Guetta | Album | Songwriter | Gold US Album #1 US Dance Albums #2 UK Dance Album #9 UK Albums #37 US Billboard 200 #3 Spanish Album Gold - Canada Gold - France 2× Platinum - Norway Silver - UK |
| 2019 | Someone ft. Goldn | Space Primates | Single | Producer, Songwriter | |
| 2019 | Thrills ft Elk Elvis | Space Primates | Single | Producer, Songwriter | |
| 2019 | Backflip (From Green Eggs And Ham) | Rivers Cuomo | Single | Producer, Songwriter | EMMY Winning PGA Award nomination Annie award |
| 2019 | Chances ft Elk Elvis | Space Primates | Single | Producer, Songwriter | |
| 2019 | Thinkin Bout You | Ciara | Single | Producer, Songwriter | |
| 2019 | It's Gonna Be a Lovely Day (Secret Life of Pets 2) | Lunchmoney Lewis, Ozuna | Single | Producer, Songwriter | End Credits Song |
| 2019 | Carpool | Red Velvet | Album | Producer, Songwriter | #1 Worldwide Album & EP |
| 2019 | Fade Out | Seeb, Space Primates, Olivia O Brien | Single | Producer, Songwriter | |
| 2019 | Smile For The Camera | Upsahl | Single | Producer, Songwriter | |
| 2019 | Wild Mannered ft Elk Elvis | Space Primates | Single | Producer, Songwriter | |
| 2019 | Flexible | Jordan McGraw | Single | Producer, Songwriter | |
| 2019 | Safety ft. DJ Snake | Gashi | Single | Producer, Songwriter | |
| 2019 | Greatness | Gashi | Single | Producer, Songwriter | |
| 2019 | Forbes List | Gashi | Album | Producer, Songwriter | |
| 2020 | Paranoid | Gashi | Single | Producer, Songwriter | |
| 2020 | Lies | Gashi | Single | Producer, Songwriter | |
| 2020 | Don't Kill Me | Gashi | Single | Producer, Songwriter | |
| 2020 | Safety 2020 ft. Chris Brown, Afro B & DJ Snake | Gashi | Single | Producer, Songwriter | |
| 2020 | Mama ft. Sting | Gashi | Single | Producer, Songwriter | |
| 2020 | PA’ LA CULTURA | David Guetta, Human(X) ft. Sofia Reyes, Abraham Mateo, De La Ghetto, Zion & Lennox, Manuel Turizo, Lalo Ebratt, Thalía, Maejor | Single | Producer, Songwriter | #1 Most Added Latin |
| 2020 | I Need You Christmas | Jonas Brothers | Single | Producer, Songwriter | #4 US Bubbling Under Hot 100 Singles |
| 2021 | Who | Donny Osmond | Single | Producer, Songwriter | |
| 2021 | Her | Jordan Mcgraw | Single | Producer, Songwriter | |
| 2021 | Antidote | Dvbbs | Album | Producer, Songwriter | |
| 2021 | Say It ft. Gashi | Dvbbs, Space Primates | Single | Producer, Songwriter | |
| 2021 | Forever Last ft. Gomey | Dvbbs | Album | Producer, Songwriter | |
| 2021 | The One | Dvbbs | Album | Producer, Songwriter | |
| 2021 | Don't Pass On Love | Gashi | Single | Producer, Songwriter | |
| 2021 | Sleeping On My Left | Gashi | Single | Producer, Songwriter | |
| 2021 | Stop | Upsahl | Single | Producer, Songwriter | |
| 2021 | Unwell | Enrique Iglesias | Album | Producer, Songwriter | 60 x Platinum Album |
| 2021 | Chasing The Sun | Enrique Iglesias | Album | Producer, Songwriter | 60 x Platinum Album |
| 2021 | All About You | Enrique Iglesias | Album | Producer, Songwriter | 60 x Platinum Album |
| 2021 | Domino | Kai | Album | Producer, Songwriter | #1 South Korea #1 iTunes worldwide |
| 2021 | Go It Alone | Joe Jonas | Single | Producer, Songwriter | Main Song in the movie Rumble |
| 2021 | Find You | Space Primates | Single | Producer, Songwriter | |
| 2021 | When I'm Gone | Alesso & Katy Perry | Single | Producer, Songwriter | Gold US Single Silver UK #90 Hot 100 |
| 2022 | Memory with GASHI | Cheat Codes and Space Primates | Single | Producer, Songwriter, Artist | |
| 2022 | No Love Again | Taeyeon | Album | Producer, Songwriter | |
| 2023 | Beautiful Liar | Monsta X | Single | Producer, Songwriter | 500k Sales |
| 2023 | Barbie Dreams | Fifty Fifty featuring Kaliii | Single | Producer, Songwriter | Grammy Winning Album |
| 2023 | I'm Sorry | Lovelytheband ft. Blackbear (musician) | Single | Producer, Songwriter | |
| 2023 | Orange Blood | Enhypen | Album | Producer, Songwriter | 2 Million Sales |
| 2024 | I Like It | Stray Kids | Album | Producer, Songwriter | 3 Million sales #1 US Billboard 200 |
| 2024 | Curious | Unis | Single | Producer, Songwriter | |
| 2024 | TTYL | Loossemble | Album | Producer, Songwriter | |
| 2024 | U | Stray Kids featuring Tablo | Album | Producer, Songwriter | 2 Million sales #1 US Billboard 200 |
| 2025 | Flashy | P1Harmony | Album | Producer | |
| 2025 | Good Girl (AtHeart) | AtHeart | Single | Producer, Songwriter | |
| 2025 | Bubble Gum | Kep1er | Album | Producer, Songwriter | |
| 2025 | Podium | Nmixx | Album | Producer, Songwriter | |
| 2025 | Miss Erotica | Peach PRC | Album | Producer | |
| 2025 | Do It | Stray Kids | Single | Producer, Songwriter | 2.5 Million Sales #1 Billboard 200 #13 Global 200 #67 Hot 100 |
| 2026 | Ice Cream | Yuna | Album | Producer, Songwriter | Producer, Songwriter |
