= Sad Song (EP) =

- Digital cover

EP by P1Harmony
- Released: September 20, 2024
- Genre: K-pop; pop; hip-hop; pop rock; Latin music
- Length: 20:25
- Language: Korean; English
- Label: FNC Entertainment
- Producer: Space Primates; Park Soo-seok; Lee Tae-hyun; Go Jin-young; Jeong Jin-wook

P1Harmony chronology
Killin' It (2024)	Sad Song (2024)	Duh! (2025)

Singles from Sad Song
- 1. "Sad Song" Released: September 20, 2024

Sad Song is the seventh Korean language extended play (EP) by South Korean boy band P1Harmony. It was released on September 20, 2024, by FNC Entertainment. The album consists of seven tracks, including the title track, "Sad Song".

== Themes and lyrics ==
The EP, comes about seven months after their first full-length album Killin' It. It has six tracks including the Lain-rhythm-themed title track. The album explores feelings of loneliness and emptiness, as well as the process of overcoming such emotions through the concept of superheroes.

I imagined what it would feel like if I were a hero. After saving the world, motivated by love and care, how empty and lonely would it feel if people eventually forgot about me? I tried to express those feelings by imagining myself not as Intak, but as a hero. The Latin genre is different from the hip-hop-based songs we usually do -- the beat is faster -- and it’s unique, so we had to interpret it differently than our previous songs.

— Intak talks about the Latin genre.

Just as heroes stand in front of people and bring them happiness, K-pop stars do the same. That’s why I think the loneliness felt by both heroes and idols is quite similar. I thought the loneliness and emptiness we feel could be expressed well through the medium of superheroes. It was such an honor to perform at the Kia Forum during the Jingle Ball Tour, but I remember Keeho saying it would be great if we could hold our own concert there. And just a year later, we filled that place with our stand-alone concert. It was really fulfilling and made me more determined to work even harder.

— Jiung talks about the same loneliness as heroes and idols.

== Commercial performance ==
Sad Song sold 179,487 copies in South Korea. It peaked at number two on the Circle Album Chart, and number 16 in Billboard 200.

== Track listing ==
No.	Title	Length
1.	"Sad Song"	2:55
2.	"It's Alright"	3:19
3.	"Last Call"	3:17
4.	"Welcome To"	3:12
5.	"All You"	3:22
6.	"WASP"	2:45
7.	"Sad Song" (English version)	2:55
Total length:		20:25

== Charts ==
=== Weekly charts ===
Weekly chart performance for Sad Song
Chart (2024–2026)	Peak position
Hungarian Physical Albums (MAHASZ)	25
South Korean Albums (Circle)	2
US Billboard 200	16
US Independent Albums (Billboard)	1
US World Albums (Billboard)	1

=== Monthly charts ===
Monthly chart performance for Sad Song
Chart (2024)	Peak position
South Korean Albums (Circle)	9

=== Year-end charts ===
Year-end chart performance for Sad Song
Chart (2024)	Position
South Korean Albums (Circle)	79

== Certifications ==
Certifications for Sad Song
Region	Certification	Certified units/sales
South Korea (KMCA)	Platinum	250,000^{^}
^{^} Shipments figures based on certification alone.
