= Disharmony: Find Out =

- Digital cover

EP by P1Harmony
- Released: January 3, 2022
- Genre: K-pop
- Length: 20:25
- Language: Korean; English
- Label: FNC Entertainment

P1Harmony chronology
Disharmony: Break Out (2021)	Disharmony: Find Out (2022)	Harmony: Zero In (2022)

Singles from Disharmony: Find Out
- 1. "Do It Like This" Released: January 3, 2022

Disharmony: Find Out is the third extended play (EP) of South Korean boy band P1Harmony. It was released by FNC Entertainment on January 3, 2022, including the lead single "Do It Like This".

== Commercial performance ==
The EP sold 108,362 copies in South Korea and peaked at number three on the Circle Album Chart.

== Track listing ==
Disharmony: Find Out track listing
No.	Title	Length
1.	"Do It Like This"	3:13
2.	"That'$ Money"	3:19
3.	"Follow Me"	3:35
4.	"Bop"	3:20
5.	"Before the Dawn"	4:21
6.	"Peacemaker"	3:26
7.	"Do It Like This" (English version)	3:13
Total length:		23:47

== Charts ==
=== Weekly charts ===
Weekly chart performance for Disharmony: Find Out
Chart (2022)	Peak position
South Korean Albums (Circle)	3

=== Monthly charts ===
Monthly chart performance for Disharmony: Find Out
Chart (2022)	Peak position
South Korean Albums (Circle)	6
