= Area code (disambiguation) =

Area code most commonly refers to routing codes in a telephone numbering plan for telephone calls to a specific geographic area.

Area code may also refer to:

- "Area Codes" (Ludacris song), 2001
- "Area Codes" (Kali song), 2023
