= Barbie Dreams (Fifty Fifty song) =

2023 single by Fifty Fifty featuring Kaliii

Promotional single by Fifty Fifty featuring Kaliii

from the album Barbie the Album
- Language: English
- Released: July 6, 2023
- Recorded: 2023
- Length: 2:29
- Label: Atlantic; Warner
- Songwriters: Faangs; JBach; James Harris; Janet Jackson; Kaliya Ashley Ross; Marc Sibley; Mike Caren; Nicholaus Joseph Williams; Nathan Cunningham; Randall Hammers; Terry Lewis; Tramaine Winfrey
- Producer: Space Primates

Lyric video
- "Barbie Dreams" on YouTube

"Barbie Dreams" is a song by South Korean girl group Fifty Fifty featuring American rapper Kaliii. It was released on July 6, 2023, through Atlantic Records and Warner Records as the second promotional single from Barbie the Album (2023), the soundtrack to the film Barbie.

== Background ==
On May 25, 2023, the artists who would be part of the Barbie soundtrack were revealed, including Fifty Fifty and Kaliii. Fifty Fifty's agency Attrakt confirmed the same day that the group's song on the soundtrack would be entitled "Barbie Dreams" and featured Kaliii. The song was released on July 6 for digital download and streaming.

== Composition ==
"Barbie Dreams" was written by Kaliii alongside Faangs, JBach, James Harris, Janet Jackson, Marc Sibley, Mike Caren, Nicholaus Joseph Williams, Nathan Cunningham, Randall Hammers, Terry Lewis and Tramaine Winfrey, and was produced by Space Primates. It is a bubblegum pop song that features an interpolation of Janet Jackson's 1997 single "Together Again". In the song, the members of Fifty Fifty celebrate a life of luxury with their girlfriends, singing "When I close my eyes, it's a fantasy / Perfect plastic life from a magazine / Then when I wake up, it's reality / I can have it all / live my Barbie dreams." Kaliii joins in with a rap verse embracing her newfound stardom and the lavish lifestyle of a celebrity with her friends by her side, stating, "Ken gon' spend 'cause I'm a ten / Pink Corvette, let's paint the rims / I give looks and set the trends / We all look good, it's me and friends."

== Canceled music video ==
A music video for "Barbie Dreams" was originally planned but scrapped following Fifty Fifty's legal battle with their agency Attrakt. A representative from Attrakt released a statement stating that initially the music video shoot was delayed due to member Aran's undergoing surgery and her two-month timetable for recovery. However, after the group members filed a court injunction to terminate their exclusive contract with the agency, the music video was canceled entirely.

== Credits and personnel ==
Credits adapted from Tidal.

- Fifty Fifty – vocals
- Kaliii – featured vocals, lyricist
- Faangs – lyricist
- JBach – lyricist
- James Harris – lyricist
- Janet Jackson – lyricist
- Marc Sibley (Space Primates) – producer, lyricist
- Mike Caren – lyricist
- Nicholaus Joseph Williams – lyricist
- Nathan Cunningham (Space Primates) – producer, lyricist
- Randall Hammers – lyricist
- Terry Lewis – lyricist
- Tramaine Winfrey – lyricist
- Randy Merrill – masterer
- Manny Marroquin – mixer
- Donelle "Phyzic" Smith—engineer

== Charts ==
Chart performance for "Barbie Dreams"
Chart (2023)	Peak position
New Zealand Hot Singles (RMNZ)	18
South Korea Download (Circle)	81

== Release history ==
Release dates and formats for "Barbie Dreams"
Region	Date	Format(s)	Label(s)	Ref.
Various	July 6, 2023	Digital download; streaming	Atlantic; Warner	
