= Disharmony: Stand Out =

- Digital cover

EP by P1Harmony
- Released: October 28, 2020
- Genre: K-pop
- Length: 15:34
- Language: Korean
- Label: FNC Entertainment

P1Harmony chronology
Disharmony: Stand Out (2020)	Disharmony: Break Out (2021)

Singles from Disharmony: Stand Out
- 1. "Siren" Released: October 28, 2020

Disharmony: Stand Out is the debut extended play of South Korean boy band P1Harmony. It was released by FNC Entertainment under license to Kakao M on October 28, 2020, including the lead single "Siren".

== Composition ==
All members participated in writing the lyrics of "Intro; Breakthrough".

== Commercial performance ==
The EP peaked at number five on the Gaon Album Chart and had sold 37,913 copies by January 2021.

== Track listing ==
Disharmony: Stand Out track listing
No.	Title	Lyrics	Music	Arrangement	Length
1.	"Intro; Breakthrough" (틀)	P1Harmony	Park Soo-seok; Seo Ji-eun; Moon Kim; Tiyon 'TC' Mack (IconicSounds)	Park Soo-seok; Seo Ji-eun	1:23
2.	"Siren"	Han Seong-ho; J.Don; Intak; Jongseob	Tha Aristocrats; Maxx Song; Rodnae "Chikk" Bell; Tesung Kim	Tha Aristocrats	3:01
3.	"Nemonade" (네모네이드)	Han Seong-ho; J.Don; Intak; Jongseob	Coach & Sendo; Siv Marit Egseth; Justin Philip Stein	Coach & Sendo	3:21
4.	"That's It" (이거지)	P1Harmony	Park Soo-seok; Seo Ji-eun	Park Soo-seok; Seo Ji-eun	2:55
5.	"Butterfly"	Han Seong-ho; Jiung; Intak; Jongseob	Tha Aristocrats; Maxx Song; Moon Kim; Louise Frick Sveen	Tha Aristocrats	3:20
6.	"Skit; Disharmony #1"				1:33
Total length:					15:34

== Charts ==
Chart performance for Disharmony: Stand Out
Chart (2020)	Peak position
South Korean Albums (Circle)	5
