= Duh! (EP) =

EP by P1Harmony
- Released: May 8, 2025
- Genres: K-pop; pop; R&B; hip-hop; hyperpop
- Length: 18:05
- Languages: Korean; English
- Label: FNC
- Producers: Lavin; Pepperjuice; Space Primates; Park Soo-seok; Seo Ji-eun; Bong Won-seok; Benjmn

P1Harmony chronology
Sad Song (2024)	Duh! (2025)	Unique (2026)

Singles from Duh!
- 1. "Duh!" Released: May 8, 2025

Duh! is the eighth Korean language extended play (EP) by South Korean boy band P1Harmony. It was released on May 8, 2025, by FNC Entertainment. The album consists of seven tracks, including the title track, "Duh!".

== Themes and lyrics ==
It has been eight months since the band last released music, with the album Sad Song coming out in 2024. Last January, the band wrapped up its second world tour, "P1ustage H: Utop1a."

The title track of the same name runs through the story of this album. 'DUH!' is a song that combines the retro charm of vintage beats and the trendy vocals of P1Harmony. In particular, the title 'DUH!' is an English expression with the nuance of 'Who is this successful person? Of course it's me! Why are you asking that!', wittily expressing the appearance of showing off a little more of myself as a HERO and accepting this situation as a given. Unlike the existing HERO who is righteous and humble, it shows a different presence with the content 'The place I sit, the path I walk is the answer'. The new album contains a total of six tracks including the title track ‘DUH!’ ‘Pretty Boy’ contains the desire to be dyed in the colors of the fans who look at them, ‘Murmur’ is a style that combines 90s R&B and hip-hop, ‘Flashy’ depicts why P1Harmony is different from others, ‘Over And Over’ shows the determination and spirit not to be easily swept away and fall no matter what threat comes, and ‘Work’ is a song that stands out for P1Harmony’s experimental vocals. Various genres of songs and the stories that P1Harmony wants to tell are included in the 8th mini album. This album also establishes the distinct musical color of P1Harmony by having the members participate in writing all the songs. Including the title song, Intak and Jongseob, who participated in writing the lyrics for all the songs, Jiung is credited with writing and composing three songs. Keeho, who has been consistently working on songs, also participated in composing "Pretty Boy," and Jongseob is credited with composing "Work," increasing the level of perfection.

== Commercial performance ==
Duh! sold 364,303 copies in South Korea. It peaked at number one on the Circle Album Chart, and number 23 in Billboard 200, number 3 on the Independent Albums chart, and number one on the World Albums chart.

== Track listing ==
Duh! track listing
No.	Title	Lyrics	Music	Arrangement	Length
1.	"Duh!"	Han Sung-ho; Jiung; Intak; Jongseob	Han; Lavin; Calle Lehmann; Jacob Aaron (The Hub)	Lavin	3:05
2.	"Pretty Boy"	Han; Jiung; Intak; Jongseob	Keeho; Charles Lebeau; Samir Benabdelmoumen; Adam Seuba	Pepperjuice	02:56
3.	"Murmur"	Han; Intak; Jongseob	Han; Eniac; Lehmann; Aaron	Eniac	03:09
4.	"Flashy"	Han; Jiung; Intak; Jongseob	Jiung; Nathan Cunningham; Marc Sibley; Benjmn	Space Primates	03:09
5.	"Over and Over"	Han; Intak; Jongseob	Han; Park Soo-seok; Seo Ji-eun; Bong Won-seok; Patrick 'J.Que' Smith; Aaron	Park; Seo; Bong	02:54
6.	"Work"	Intak; Jongseob	Jongseob; Benjmn; Lehmann	Benjmn	03:32
Total length:					18:05

== Charts ==
=== Weekly charts ===
Weekly chart performance for Duh!
Chart (2025–2026)	Peak position
Croatian International Albums (HDU)	38
Hungarian Physical Albums (MAHASZ)	15
South Korean Albums (Circle)	1
US Billboard 200	23
US Independent Albums (Billboard)	3
US World Albums (Billboard)	1

=== Monthly charts ===
Monthly chart performance for Duh!
Chart (2025)	Position
South Korean Albums (Circle)	9

=== Year-end charts ===
Year-end chart performance for Duh!
Chart (2025)	Position
South Korean Albums (Circle)	58

== Certifications ==
Certifications for Duh!
Region	Certification	Certified units/sales
South Korea (KMCA)	Platinum	250,000^{^}
^{^} Shipments figures based on certification alone.
