= Kytami =

Canadian musician

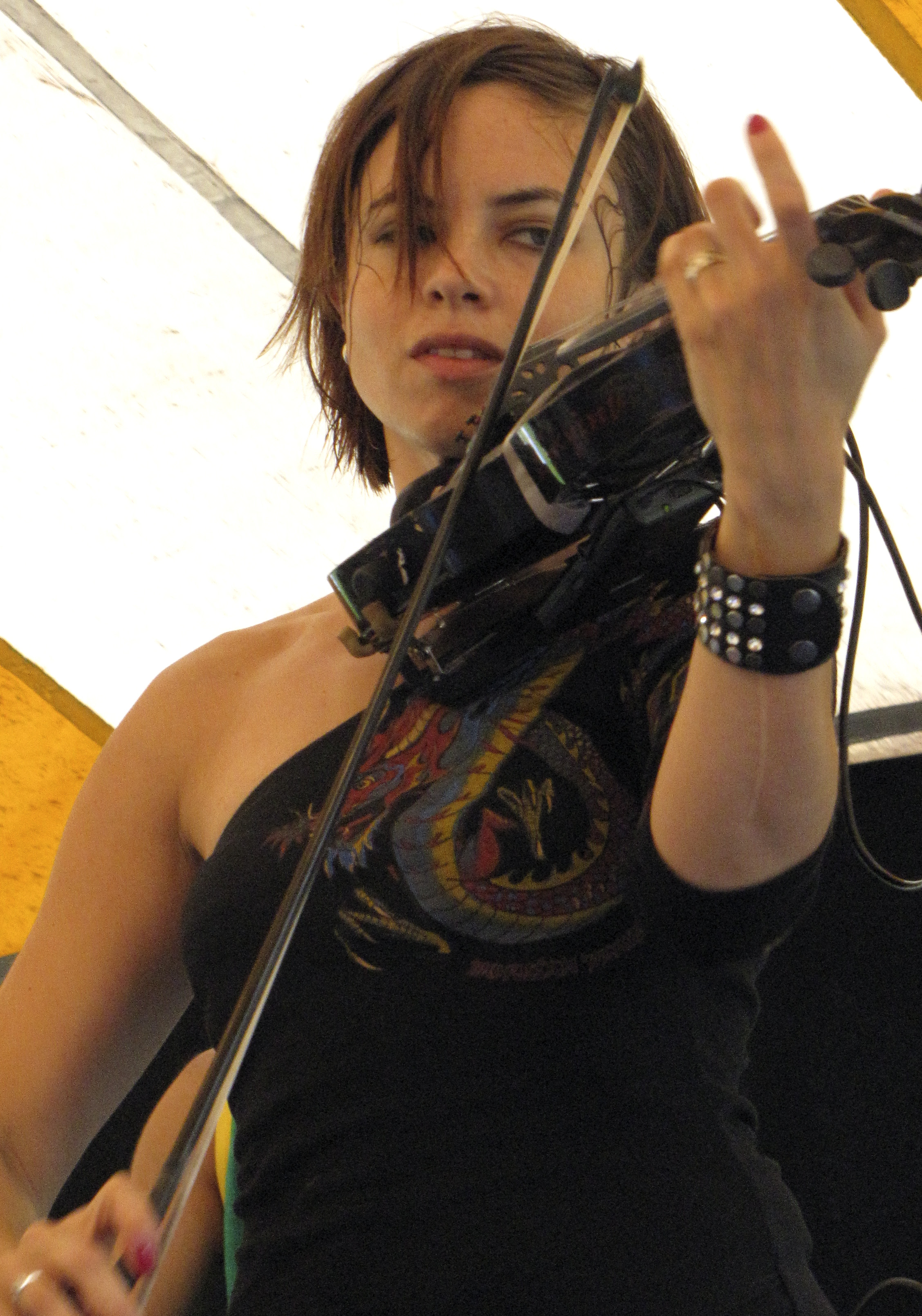
- Kytami performing in 2010

Background information
- Born: Kyla Tamiko Uyede; Vancouver, British Columbia, Canada
- Genres: Drum and bass; hip-hop; punk rock; dance
- Occupations: Musician; singer; rapper
- Instruments: Violin; vocals
- Years active: 2002–present
- Member of: Blackie and the Triumphs
- Formerly of: Delhi 2 Dublin
- Website: kytami.com

Kyla Tamiko LeBlanc (née Uyede), better known by her stage name Kytami, is a Canadian violinist, singer, and rapper. Born in Vancouver, she started taking violin lessons at the age of three and trained classically at the Vancouver Academy of Music from ages 3 to 17. In 2002, she recorded her first solo album, Conflation. In 2006, she co-founded the Bhangra/electronic group Delhi 2 Dublin but left in late 2010 to continue her solo career. Her second, self-titled studio album, came out in 2012, followed by a remix album in 2014 and the EP Renegade in 2017. Kytami is also a member of the group Blackie and the Triumphs, which is led by her husband, Jay "Blackie" LeBlanc. In 2011, they released their debut album, Thinkinaboutdrinkin.

Her stage name, Kytami, blends her first and middle names. She is of mixed Japanese, Filipino, and English descent.

== Discography ==
=== Solo ===
- Conflation (2002)
- Kytami (2012)
- Kytami – Remixes (2014)
- Renegade (EP, 2017)

=== with Delhi 2 Dublin ===
- Delhi 2 Dublin (2007)
- Delhi 2 Dublin Remixed (2008)
- Planet Electric (2010)
- Planet: Electrified (2011)
- Delhi to Dubland (EP, 2011)

=== with Blackie and the Triumphs ===
- Thinkinaboutdrinkin (2011)
