= Killin' It =

- Digital cover

Studio album by P1Harmony
- Released: February 5, 2024
- Genre: K-pop
- Length: 30:30
- Language: Korean; English
- Label: FNC

P1Harmony chronology
Harmony: All In (2023)	Killin' It (2024)	Sad Song (2024)

Singles from Killin' It
- 1. "Killin' It" Released: February 5, 2024

Killin' It (Korean: 때깔; RR: Ttaekkal; lit. 'Stain') is the debut studio album by South Korean boy band P1Harmony, released on February 5, 2024, through FNC Entertainment. It was promoted by the lead single "Killin' It", whose music video was released alongside the album. It debuted atop the Circle Album Chart and in the top 40 of the US Billboard 200.

== Background and composition ==
Rapper Jongseob co-wrote all tracks on the album, while members Keeho, Jiung and Intak co-wrote several tracks. The album was called an exploration of "throwback retro styles".

== Commercial performance ==
Killin' It marks P1Harmony's highest charting release to date, becoming their first number-one album in South Korea, where it sold 148,136 copies in its first week. The album also debuted at number 39 on the US Billboard 200 and number eight on the US Independent Albums chart, selling 18,000 copies in its first week, and entered the Top Album Sales chart at number two.

== Track listing ==
Killin' It track listing
No.	Title	Lyrics	Music	Arrangement	Length
1.	"Killin' It" (때깔)	Han Seong-ho; Sooyoon; Jongseob	Han; Sebastian Thott; Patrick "J. Que" Smith; Jacob Aaron (The Hub)	Thott	2:56
2.	"Late Night Calls"	Han; Sooyoon; Intak; Jongseob	Han; Park Soo-seok; Seo Ji-eun; Bejmn	Park; Seo	2:41
3.	"Everybody Clap"	Han; Sooyoon; Jiung; Intak; Jongseob	Han; Seo; Bong Won-seok; Eric Bellinger	Seo; Bong	3:21
4.	"Love Story" (꿍꿍이)	Han; Jiung; Intak; Jongseob	Han; Park; Seo; Moon Kim (Room 01); Jiung	Park; Seo	3:46
5.	"Countdown to Love"	Han; Sooyoon; Intak; Jongseob	Han; Lee Hyun-seung; TM; Bejmn	Lee; TM	2:45
6.	"Emergency"	Han; Sooyoon; Intak; Jongseob	Delarge; Benjmn; Didrik Thott	Delarge	2:44
7.	"2Nite"	Han; Sooyoon; Intak; Jongseob	Han; Park; Bong; Benjmn; Aaron	Park; Bong	3:20
8.	"Let Me Love You"	Han; Sooyoon; Jiung; Intak; Jongseob	Han; Smith; Lee; TM; Softserveboy	Lee; TM; Softserveboy; Hwang Tae-young	3:13
9.	"Street Star"	Han; Sooyoon; Intak; Jongseob	Han; Lee; TM; Bellinger; Benjmn	Lee; TM	2:52
10.	"I See U"	Jiung; Intak; Jongseob	Park; Seo; Keeho; Jongseob	Park; Seo	2:52
Total length:					30:30

== Charts ==
=== Weekly charts ===
Weekly chart performance for Killin' It
Chart (2024)	Peak position
Croatian International Albums (HDU)	20
Hungarian Physical Albums (MAHASZ)	15
South Korean Albums (Circle)	1
US Billboard 200	39
US Independent Albums (Billboard)	8
US World Albums (Billboard)	1

=== Monthly charts ===
Monthly chart performance for Killin' It
Chart (2024)	Position
South Korean Albums (Circle)	8

=== Year-end charts ===
Year-end chart performance for Killin' It
Chart (2024)	Position
South Korean Albums (Circle)	95
