= Hello82 =

K-pop content and record company

hello82
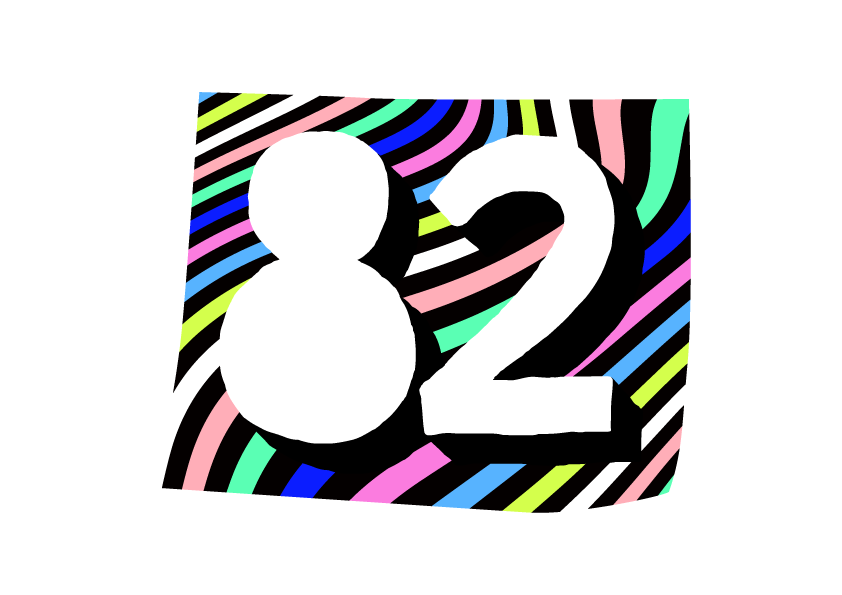
- Industry: Music entertainment
- Founded: 2018; 8 years ago
- Founder: Jae Yoon Choi
- Headquarters: Los Angeles, California, United States
- Key people: Jae Yoon Choi (CEO); Sang H. Cho (COO); Moo Hyun Kim (CSO)
- Website: hello82.com

Hello82 (stylized as hello82) is an American music and entertainment company founded in Los Angeles, California. The company serves as a record label specializing in distribution, marketing, event-planning, and content production. It operates with a global focus on promoting K-pop to audiences worldwide.

== History ==
KAI Media, operating as hello82 was founded in 2018. The company was founded in Los Angeles, California by Jae Yoon Choi as a digital media company, and has served as an independent music label since 2021. It has offices in Los Angeles, Atlanta, and Seoul. In 2019, hello82 became an official Facebook media partner and started producing Facebook original shows such as 82Challenge and 82minutes.

In 2021, the South Korean girl group Itzy collaborated with hello82 to introduce a new series titled IT'z Playtime. Additionally, hello82 began partnering with K-pop artists for music distribution online and in-person for the United States and Europe market during the same year. In 2022, hello82 initiated their in-person event series, PLAY82, with Nmixx. In 2022, hello82 established over twelve pop-up stores in various locations which were decorated with photo walls, offered giveaways, and featured customized merchandise during the ATEEZ tour. Moreover, they unveiled their flagship fan space, hello82 LA. Subsequently, in 2024, an additional flagship fan space was established in Atlanta.

In March 2024, hello82 announced that it secured funding from CRIT Ventures, Kakao Entertainment, and Snow Corp. bringing funding to $8 million to date. hello82's YouTube channel has over 1.8 million followers with K-pop celebrities doing viral challenges, playing celebrity babysitter to kids and singing karaoke in foreign languages.

== Artists ==
- Ateez
- Oneus
- P1Harmony
- STAYC
- xikers

== Releases ==
P1Harmony's sixth mini-album, "HARMONY: ALL-IN", which was distributed by hello82, entered the Billboard 200 chart in June 2023. This marked the group's first Billboard 200 entry. Later on in 2023, hello82 did the physical distribution and promotion of, ATEEZ's The World EP.Fin: Will, which debuted at the top of the US Billboard 200 chart with 152,000 album-equivalent units, including 146,000 pure album sales. This marked Ateez's first number-one and fourth top-10 album in the United States. The album also performed well in the United Kingdom, reaching a peak position of 2. In 2024, hello82 released a special vinyl version of The World EP.Fin: Will (X Ver.) for Record Store Day, marking their venture into vinyl distribution.
