= Bludnymph =

Canadian singer

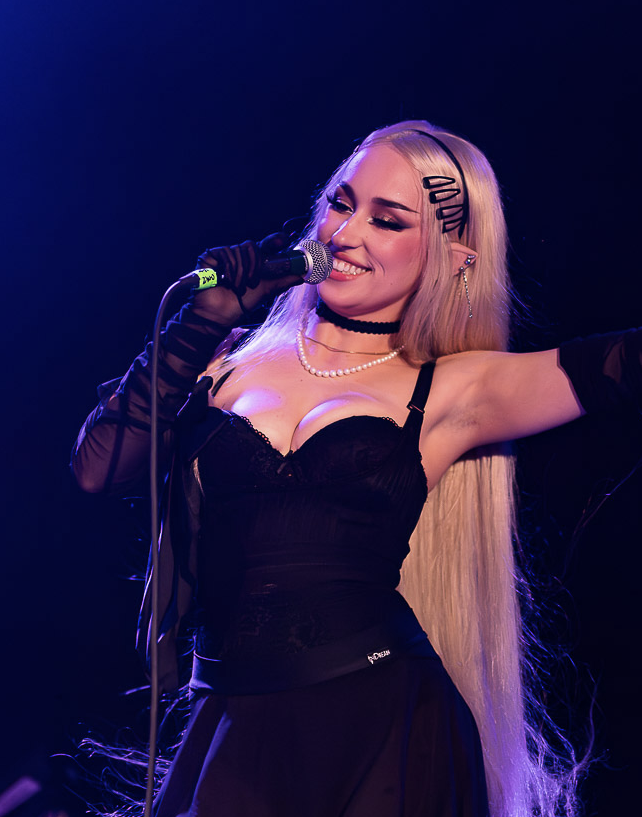
- Bludnymph in 2023

Background information
- Born: Kya Hansen
- Origin: Kelowna, British Columbia, Canada.
- Occupations: Singer; songwriter
- Label: APG

Kya Hansen, professionally known as bludnymph (stylized in all lowercase), is a Canadian singer and rapper.

== Career ==
Bludnymph signed to Artist Partner Group in 2021. Her single "Feast" garnered attention through placements in the Netflix series Heartbreak High, and in Taco Bell's most-seen ad of 2023. She then collaborated with pop producer Cirkut, and songwriter Faangs on her single, "Lights Out", released January 2023. In 2023, Bludnymph was featured on The Chainsmokers's song "Self Destruction Mode", which debuted at No. 16 on the Billboard Hot Dance/Electronic Songs chart. EDM.com called the release an "...ode to the self-defeating".

== Discography ==
All credits are adapted from Spotify and Apple Music.

=== Singles ===
==== As lead artist ====
Title	Year	Album	Writer(s)	Producer(s)
"Wishin" (with Indigowavv)	2021	Non-album singles	Indigo Hunter Gray, Kya Hansen	Indigowavv
"Feast"	2021	Non-album singles	DJ Horse, Kya Hansen	DJ Horse
"Moonwater"	2022	Non-album singles	Brandon John, Kya Hansen	Brandon John, DonnyBravo
"Lickity Splickity"	2022	Non-album singles	Kya Hansen	S3npai, Brandon John
"Mozart"	2022	Non-album singles	Kya Hansen Faangs, Marvy Ayy	Marvy Ayy
"Press It" (Fast & Furious Drift Tape/Phonk Vol 1)	2022	Fast & Furious Drift Tape/Phonk Vol 1	Henry Russell Walter, Kya Hansen, Maize Jane, Olinger	Cirkut
"Lights Out"	2023	Non-album singles	Henry Russell Walter, Faangs, Kya Hansen	Cirkut
"Feast" (featuring TiaCorine)	2023	Non-album singles	DJ Horse, Kya Hansen, TiaCorine	DJ Horse
"Watch Me"	2023	Non-album singles	Henry Russell Walter, Faangs, Kya Hansen	Cirkut
"Bizarre" (featuring 6arelyhuman)	2023	Non-album singles	Boy Matthews, Alexander Lewis, Alma Goodman, Kya Hansen, Toby Hamilton	Alexander Lewis
"6izarre Rave" (featuring 6arelyhuman & Pixel Hood)	2023	Non-album singles	Boy Matthews, Alexander Lewis, Alma Goodman, Kya Hansen, Toby Hamilton	Pixel Hood
"End of the World"	2023	Non-album singles	Henry Russell Walter, Jake Torrey, Faangs, Kya Hansen	Cirkut
"Oral Hex (Spell on You)"	2023	Non-album singles	Imad Royal, Jesse Fink, Solly, Kya Hansen	Imad Royal, Cirkut
"Grim Reaper"	2023	Non-album singles	Andrew Goldstein, Faangs, Henry Russell Walter, Kya Hansen	Andrew Goldstein, Cirkut
"The Things I Do For Love"	2024	Non-album singles	Arthur Besnainou, Christopher J Baran, Kya Hansen	CJ Baran, Arthur Besna
"Deserve Each Other"	2024	Non-album singles	Breyan Isaac, Everett Romano, Inverness, Kya Hansen	Inverness, Heavy Mellow
“Squeak”	2026	Nympho	Kya Hansen, Faangs, Henry Russell Walter	Cirkut
“Sex Toy”	2026	Nympho	Kya Hansen, Janée “Jin Jin” Bennett, Charles Robert Nelson	Inverness
“Nice Guys Finish Last”	2026	Nympho	Kya Hansen, Cj Baran, Cass Lowe, Lillian Phyllis Davies	Cj Baran, Cass Lowe
“Polyamóre”	2026	Nympho	Kya Hansen, Drew Louis, Jayelle Gerber	Drew Louis
“Raised by Wolves” (with Jayelle)	2026	Non-album single	Drew Louis, Jayelle, Ash Gordon	Drew Louis

==== As featured artist ====
Title	Year	Album
"Phantom" (Dangosmoothie featuring Bludnymph)	2018	Neo Angel
"She Is Home" (Notsick featuring Bludnymph)	2021	Non-album single
"Self Destruction Mode" (The Chainsmokers with Bludnymph)	2023	Summertime Friends
"Steve Aoki" (Wreckno featuring Bludnymph)	2023	Non-album singles
"Praise" (Zhu, Banks & Bludnymph)	2024	Non-album singles
"Enemies" (Gryffin, Shift K3Y & Bludnymph)	2024	Pulse
"Beautiful Nightmare" (Alan Walker & Bludnymph)	2024	Neon Nights
"Trillion$" (Malibu Babie featuring Bludnymph)	2025	Non-album singles
"Boys Boys Boys" (Lilyisthatyou featuring Bludnymph)	2025	Non-album singles

=== Extended plays ===
Title	Details
Popsicle	Released: 10 May 2023; Label: Artist Partner Group; Formats: Digital download, streaming; Track listing: 1. "Popsicle"; 2. "Watch Me"; 3. "Lights Out"; 4. "Incognito"; 5. "Feast (Let's Eat Yuh Yuh)"
Drool	Released: 25 October 2023; Label: Artist Partner Group; Formats: Digital download, streaming; Track listing: 1. "Body Parts"; 2. "Lights Out"; 3. "Grim Reaper"; 4. "Oral Hex (Spell on You)"; 5. "DarkMagicSillySexy (Origin Story)"; 6. "End of the World"; 7. "Personal Pornstar"; 8. "Watch Me"; 9. "6izzare Rave (with 6arelyhuman)
Nympho	Released: 14 August 2026; Label: Nymph Universe; Formats: Digital download, streaming; Track listing: 1. "Would You Ever?"; 2. "Sex Toy"; 3. "Call Me Daddy"; 4. "2 Boys"; 5. "Polyamóre"; 6. “Bubblegum Pink”; 7. “Nice Guys Finish Last”; 8. “Squeak”
