= Titan Content =

American entertainment company

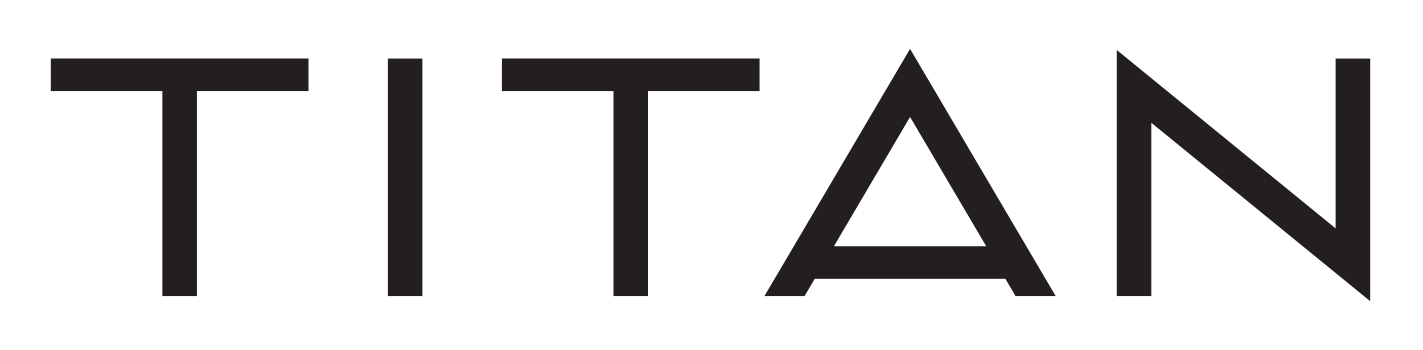
- Type: Private
- Industry: Entertainment
- Founded: 2023
- Founders: Nikki Semin Han; Katie Kang; Lia Kim; Guiom Lee
- Headquarters: Los Angeles, United States
- Key people: Nikki Semin Han (chairman); Katie Kang (CEO); Lia Kim (chief performance officer); Guiom Lee (chief visual officer); Dom Rodriguez (chief business officer)

Titan Content (also styled in all caps) is an American entertainment company that launched K-pop artists. It was founded in 2023 and is based in Los Angeles, with operations also in Seoul.

== History ==
Founded in 2023, Titan Content was created by seasoned veterans of the Korean music industry. The group comprises SM Entertainment former CEO Nikki Semin Han (stage name Han Se-min), casting and trainees SM Entertainment and The Boyz alum Katie Kang, choreographer Lia Kim, and visual director Guiom Lee, with Dom Rodriguez becoming the chief business officer.

The company held auditions in North America and Australia in early 2024. In February 2025 it announced a partnership with Imperial Music, an imprint of Republic Records, related to the debut of its first group.

In April 2025 Titan Content reached a first closing for a Series A funding. The money came from investors RW3 Ventures, Korea Investment Partners and Knowmerce.

== Operations ==
Headquartered in Los Angeles, Titan Content is carrying out activities ranging from training to production which may take place in Seoul. The concept of creating American-based artists, not expanding Korean agencies after domestic debut, it was reported.

== Artists ==
=== Current ===
- AtHeart - Girl group that debuted on August 13, 2025, with the EP Plot Twist. Members are Michi, Katelyn, Seohyeon, Aurora, Bome, Arin, and Nahyun. The group members is from South Korea, the United States, the Philippines, and Japan. A pre-debut single, "Good Girl (AtHeart)", was released earlier in 2025.
