= Gashi (rapper) =

American rapper (born 1989)

- Born: Labinot Gashi; October 4, 1989 (age 37); Tripoli, Libya
- Origin: Brooklyn, New York, U.S.
- Genres: Hip-hop; pop; R&B
- Occupations: Rapper; singer; songwriter
- Years active: 2011–present
- Label: RCA
- Website: gashiworld.com

Labinot Gashi (pronounced [ɡaˈʃi]; born October 4, 1989), known mononymously as Gashi (stylised as GASHI), is an American rapper, singer and songwriter.

== Biography ==
Labinot Gashi was born in Tripoli, Libya, on October 4, 1989, to ethnic Albanian parents from Kosovo. He spent his childhood in several African and European countries before settling in Brooklyn, New York City, at the age of 10.

Struggling to pick up the English language, he turned to music to help ease his adjustment into society, and quickly became hooked to rap. Gashi graduated from New Utrecht High School and earned a football scholarship to play at a Division 2 school in Massachusetts (American International College). Although Gashi earned honors during his first year in college, he decided to drop out of college and concentrate more on music. He prepared his first mixtape and initially adopted the stage name The Kid Gashi to change it later to Gashi and eventually G4SHI. His stage name has officially changed back to GASHI.

Gashi won First Look Sessions' "First Time Performances" in 2010 and 2011. His debut project, the mixtape Last of a Rare Breed (2011) was hosted by Erkman, and featured tracks with Nipsey Hussle and French Montana. In 2012, G4shi founded his own group called Moxy. 2012 was a breakthrough year with the release of the hit "Rocket". In 2012, he also released "Beautiful World" under his crew Moxy. Future tracks, which included "Who Made Me" and "Laughing", were featured on Hot 97 after Peter Rosenberg co-signed him.

In 2013, he released a follow-up mixtape I'll Be Right With You. A later project, entitled, 4Play featured his single "Room 4". In 2015, he released the track "Switch Up" and in 2016 "Day Ones" followed by "Turn Me Down" and "Disrespectful" both in 2017. The song "Disrespectful" was also featured in episode 4 of Showtime's The Chi.

The self-titled LP is his first studio release for RCA Records and was released in 2019. The album comprises 16 songs, featuring G-Eazy, French Montana, DJ Snake and Maxx Owa, among others. The project was led by a number of singles, including "Creep on Me" featuring French Montana, "Safety" featuring DJ Snake, and "My Year" with G-Eazy.

== Discography ==
=== Studio albums ===
- 2014: 4Play
- 2016: Stairs
- 2019: Gashi
- 2020: 1984
- 2022: Elevators
- 2024: Brooklyn Cowboy
- 2025: The Killah Whales of Gotham
- 2025: If You Find This, It‘s Yours

=== Mixtapes ===
- 2011: Last of a Rare Breed

=== Extended plays ===
- 2018: Long Story Short
- 2020: Cabin Fever
- 2020: Butterflies

=== Singles ===
==== As lead artist ====
Title	Year	Peak chart positions	Album
Title	Year	SWI	Album
"Creep on Me" (featuring French Montana and DJ Snake)	2018	4	Gashi
"My Year" (featuring G-Eazy)	2019	—	Gashi
"That's Mine" (featuring Ledri Vula)	2019	41	Non-album single
"Roses"	2019	—	Gashi
"Safety" (featuring DJ Snake)	2019	92	Gashi
"Mr. Ferrari"	2019	—	1984
"Paranoid"	2020	—	1984
"Upset" (featuring Pink Sweats and Njomza)	2020	—	1984
"Lies"	2020	—	1984
"—" denotes a recording that did not chart or was not released.

==== As featured artist ====
Title	Year	Album
"Slippin" (Ava Max featuring Gashi)	2018	Non-album singles
"Like You Do" (Florian Picasso featuring Ally Brooke and Gashi)	2020	Non-album singles
"Oops (I'm Sorry)" (Lost Kings featuring Ty Dolla Sign and Gashi)	2020	It's Not You, It's Me
"Delali" (Khaled featuring Gashi)	2020	Non-album singles
"Benz I Know" (Remix) (Kelvyn Colt and Gashi)	2020	Non-album singles
"Amnesia" (Loud Luxury and Ship Wrek featuring Gashi)	2021	Non-album singles
"Say It" (Dvbbs and Space Primates featuring Gashi)	2021	Sleep
"Memory" (Cheat Codes and Space Primates featuring Gashi)	2022	Hellraisers, Pt. 3
