= P1Harmony =

South Korean boy band

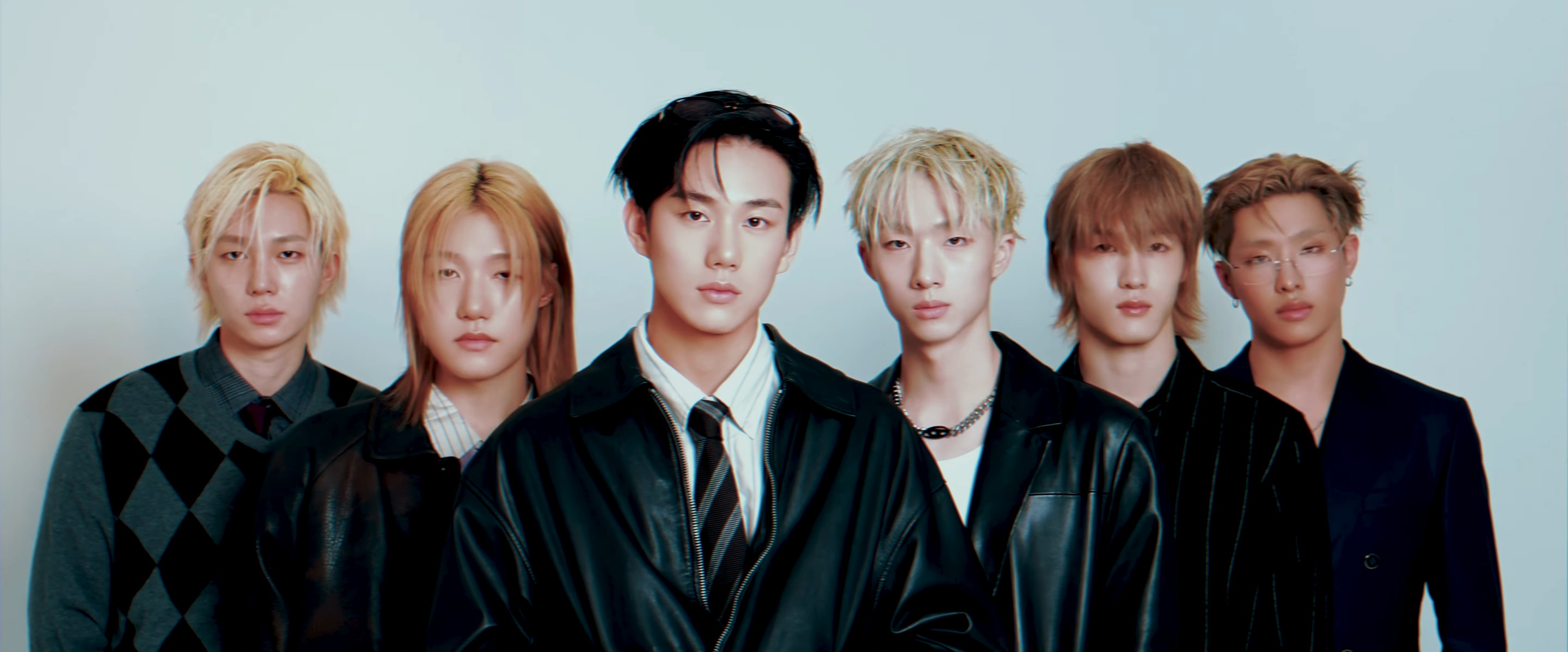
- P1Harmony in 2026; L–R: Theo, Jongseob, Intak, Jiung, Soul, Keeho

Background information
- Also known as: P1H
- Origin: Seoul, South Korea
- Genres: K-pop; hip-hop; R&B
- Years active: 2020–present
- Labels: FNC; CAA
- Members: Keeho; Theo; Jiung; Intak; Soul; Jongseob
- Website: fncent.com/P1Harmony/

P1Harmony (P1H; Korean: 피원하모니) is a South Korean boy band formed and managed by FNC Entertainment, consisting of Keeho, Theo, Jiung, Intak, Soul, and Jongseob. The group was introduced through the film P1H: The Beginning of a New World on August 27, 2020, and later debuted on October 28, 2020, with their first EP Disharmony: Stand Out.

== Name ==
The team name, P1Harmony, is a combination of Plus, the Number 1, and Harmony. Members of the group are all 'plus' (added) together to create 'one' group for achieving infinite possibilities for 'harmonies'.

The official fan club name of P1Harmony is P1ece (Korean: 피스) which was announced on April 20, 2021, meaning that fans are indispensable pieces for P1Harmony.

== History ==
=== Pre-debut ===
Prior to their debut, Jongseob was a contestant on the SBS reality program K-pop Star 6: The Last Chance as a member of Boyfriend. He won the program and then signed with YG Entertainment. Two years later, he joined the label's own survival show YG Treasure Box as a member of Group C but was eliminated in the ninth episode. After leaving YG Entertainment, he moved to FNC Entertainment and eventually debuted with the group.

In 2018, Intak appeared as a guest on the 10th episode of the JTBC variety show I've Fallen For You.

=== 2020: Debut and Disharmony: Stand Out ===
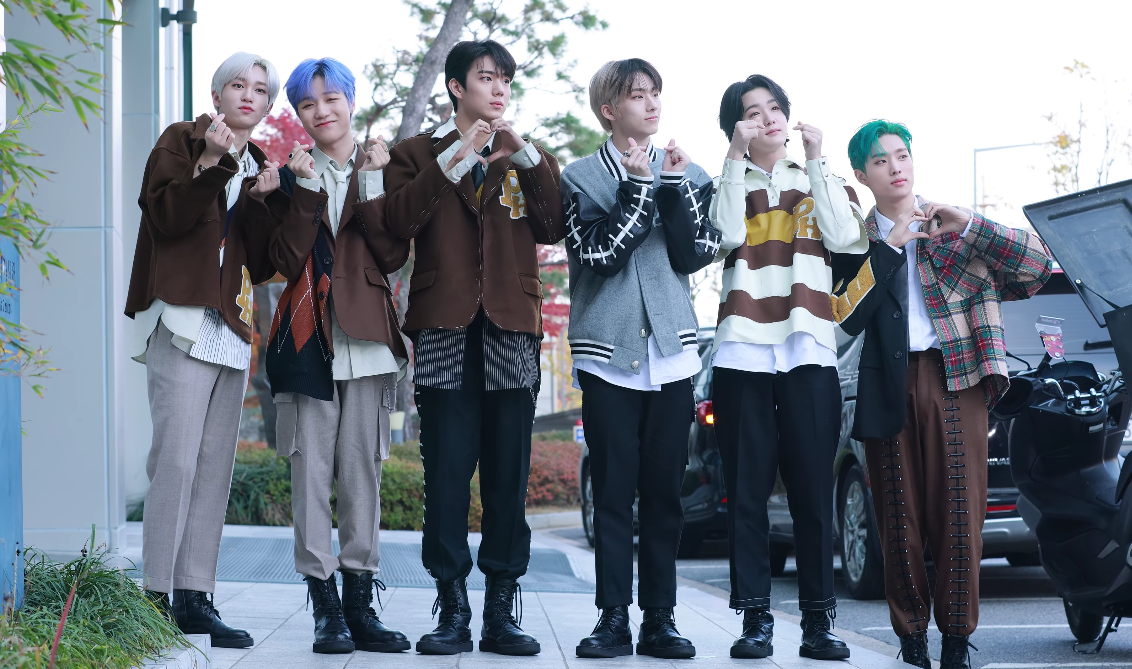
P1Harmony at 'Show! Music Core' on November 14, 2020

In August 2020, FNC Entertainment announced they were gearing up to debut a new boy group. On the 27th, the company released the teaser poster of the group's debut movie P1H: The Beginning of a New World, which they described as a fusion project combining K-pop and K-movie.

On September 1, FNC Entertainment officially announced the name of their new boy group P1Harmony, followed by a Logo Performance video. On September 8, 2020, the main teaser was officially unveiled on P1Harmony's official YouTube account.

On October 8, the group's movie P1H: The Beginning of a New World, starring the entire group, was premiered.

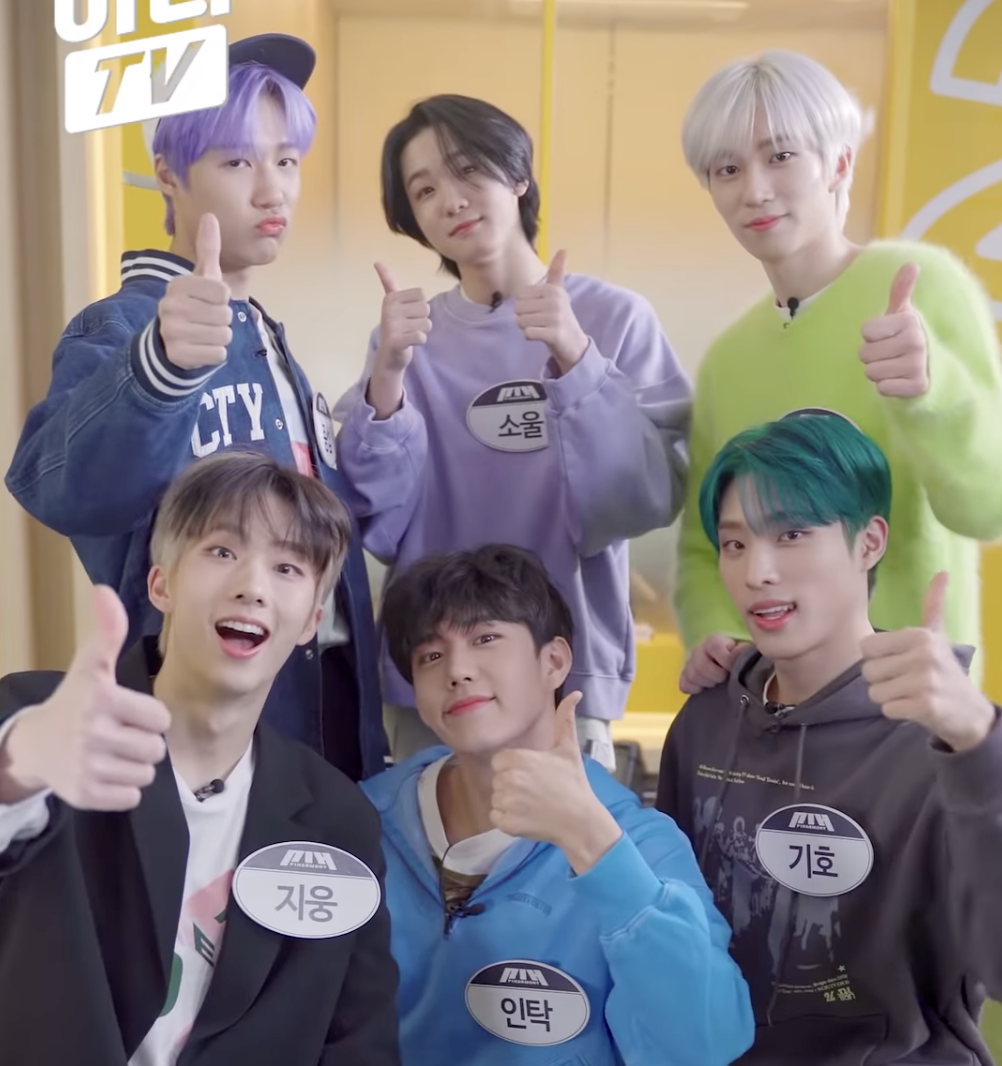
P1Harmony at ARATV on November 24, 2020

On October 28, the group debuted with their EP Disharmony: Stand Out and its lead single, "Siren". The group participated in writing the lyrics for the songs in the album.

On December 29, the group released the full version of "Breakthrough" through an art collaboration planned together with fashion and culture magazine Dazed titled "Mix Harmony". The song was based on one of their debut songs "Intro; (틀) Breakthrough" to which they expanded the meaning of the lyrics.

=== 2021–2022: Disharmony: Break Out, Disharmony: Find Out, Gotta Get Back, Harmony: Zero In, and Harmony: Set In ===
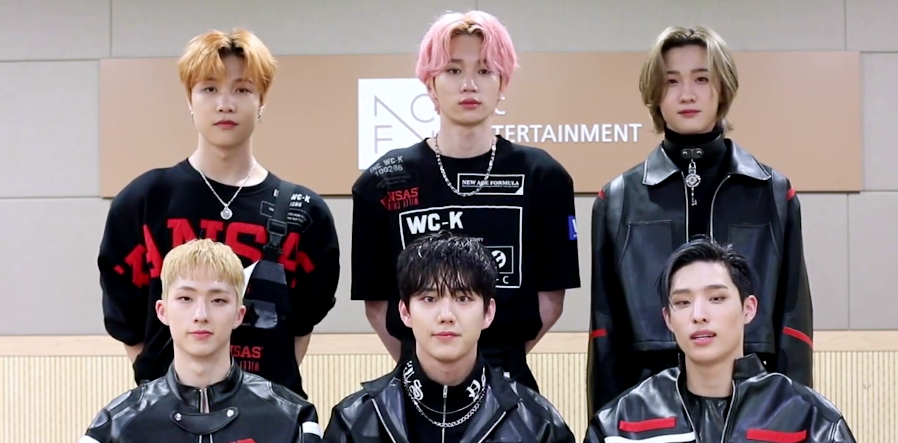
P1Harmony in 2021

On April 20, 2021, the group made their first comeback with their second EP Disharmony: Break Out and its lead single "Scared."

On January 3, 2022, the group released their third EP Disharmony: Find Out, and its lead single "Do It Like This".

On February 26, 2022, the group began their first overseas tour 2022 P1Harmony LIVE TOUR [P1ustage H: PEACE] in Seoul and visited eight cities in the United States after.

On March 10, 2022, the group released the English version of "Do it Like This".

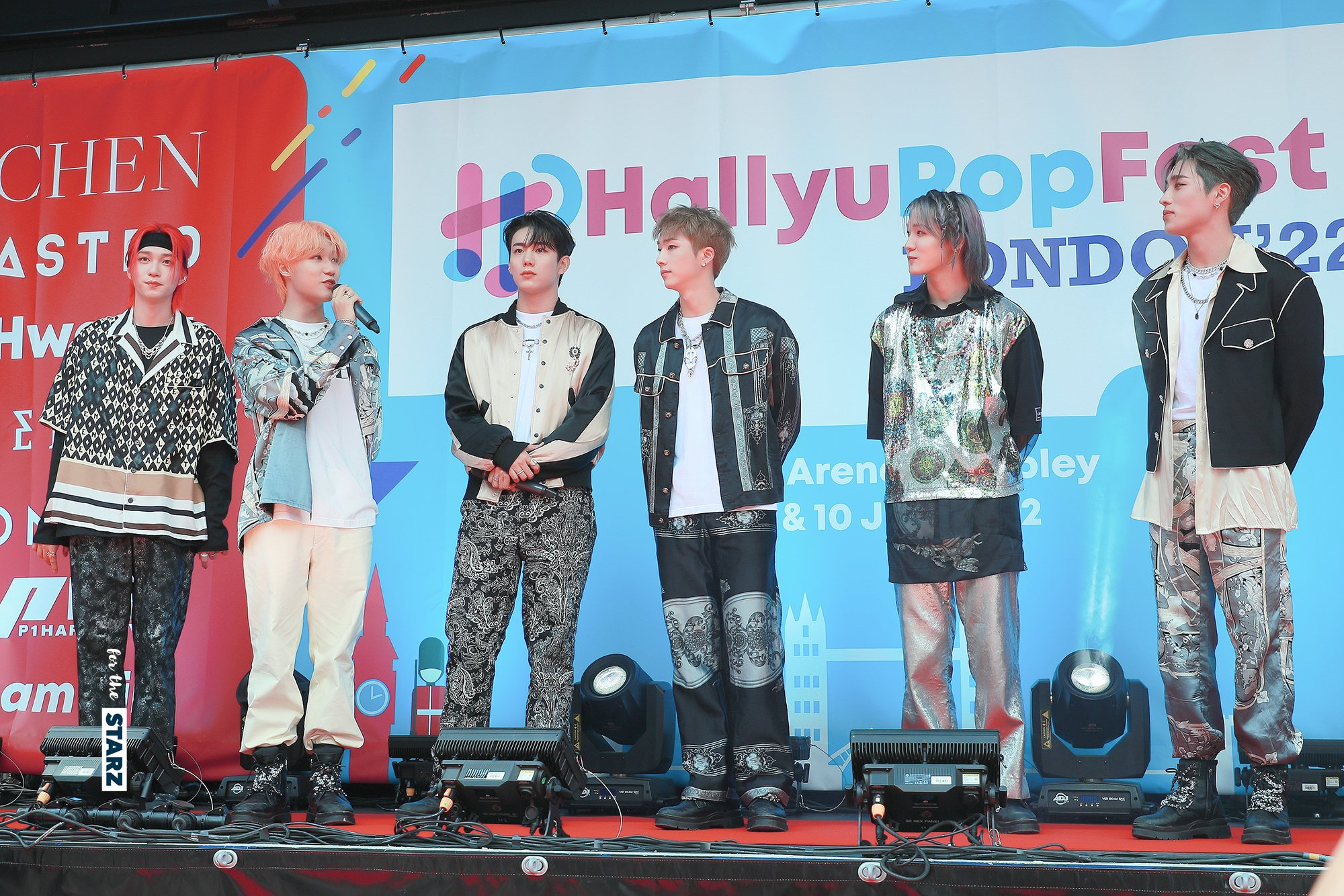
P1Harmony at HallyuPopFest London on July 9, 2022

On May 26, 2022, the group released their digital single "Gotta Bet Back" in collaboration with American artist Pink Sweat$. The song was composed by Pink Sweat$, while members Intak and Jongseob directly participated in the lyrics.

On July 20, 2022, the group released their fourth EP Harmony: Zero In, and its lead single "Doom Du Doom".

On November 29, 2022, the group performed "Back Down," the lead single of their new EP which was set to be released the following day, on the NBC daytime talk show The Kelly Clarkson Show, marking their US TV debut.

On November 30, 2022, the group released their fifth EP Harmony: Set In and its lead single "Back Down".

=== 2023: Harmony: All In, and Fall in Love Again ===
On January 14, P1Harmony embarked on their second overseas tour 2023 P1Harmony Live Tour [P1ustage H: P1ONEER] where they visited 39 cities around the world.

On April 21, the group released their digital single "Super Chic" in collaboration with British pop trio New Hope Club. They participated in the lyric-making, composition, and arrangement of the song.

On June 8, the group released their sixth EP Harmony: All In, and its lead single "Jump". On the 21st, it was revealed that the album made entry to the Billboard's Top 200 Albums chart. For the week ending on June 24, the album debuted on the Billboard 200 at No. 51. The group also debuted on Billboard's Artist 100 at No. 35, marking their first-ever appearance on the chart since their debut in 2020. On the same week, the album entered the Billboard's World Albums at No. 3, No. 8 on both Top Album Sales and Top Current Album Sales, and No. 11 on Independent Albums.

On October 30, the original soundtrack of the KBS2 drama The Matchmakers entitled Half of My Heart by Theo was released.

On November 8, the group released their digital single "Fall in Love Again" in collaboration with American producer Tricky Stewart. On December 12, it was announced that the song sat at No. 40 of the U.S. radio chart Mediabase, becoming the fourth K-pop boy band to enter the said chart. Intak and Jongseob participated in writing the lyrics of the song.

=== 2024–present: Killin' It, Sad Song, and Duh! ===
On February 5, 2024, P1Harmony released their first album Killin' It and its lead single of the same name. P1Harmony received their first-ever music show win on February 16 on KBS2TV's Music Bank.

On April 27, the group embarked on their third overseas tour 2024 P1Harmony Live Tour [P1ustage H: UTOP1A] with a two-day show in Seoul, followed by performing in 11 North American cities starting May 14.

On May 13, the group released the English version of "Killin' It".

The group released their seventh EP Sad Song on September 20, with the lead single of the same name.

P1Harmony's eighth EP Duh! was released on May 8, 2025, alongside the lead single of the same name. The EP saw commercial success, scoring the group their highest first-week sales figures, with over 440,000 copies sold according to Hanteo. Duh! also became their second record to debut atop the Circle Album Chart in South Korea, after Killin' It (2024).

== Members ==
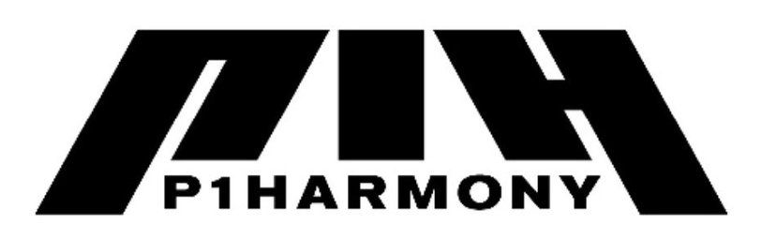
P1Harmony Official Logo

- Keeho (기호) – leader, vocalist
- Theo (테오) – vocalist
- Jiung (지웅) – vocalist, rapper, dancer
- Intak (인탁) – rapper, dancer
- Soul (소울) – vocalist, dancer
- Jongseob (종섭) – rapper, dancer

== Discography ==
=== Albums ===
==== Studio albums ====
| Title | Details | Peak chart positions | | | | Sales |
| Title | Details | KOR | US | US Indie | US World | Sales |
|---|---|---|---|---|---|---|
| Killin' It | Released: February 5, 2024; Label: FNC Entertainment; Formats: CD, digital download, streaming; Track listing: 1. "Killin' It"; 2. "Late Night Calls"; 3. "Everybody Clap"; 4. "Love Story"; 5. "Countdown to Love"; 6. "Emergency"; 7. "2Nite"; 8. "Let Me Love You"; 9. "Street Star"; 10. "I See U" | 1 | 39 | 8 | 1 | KOR: 237,495; US: 18,000 |

==== Compilation albums ====
| Title | Details | Peak chart positions | Sales |
| Title | Details | JPN | Sales |
|---|---|---|---|
| Love & P1ece: The Best of P1Harmony | Released: August 21, 2024; Label: FNC Entertainment; Formats: CD, digital download, streaming | 10 | JPN: 11,368 |

=== Extended plays ===
==== Korean EPs ====
| Title | Details | Peak chart positions | | | | | | Sales | Certifications |
| Title | Details | KOR | JPN | SWE Phy. | US | US Indie | US World | Sales | Certifications |
|---|---|---|---|---|---|---|---|---|---|
| Disharmony: Stand Out | Released: October 28, 2020; Label: FNC Entertainment; Formats: CD, digital download, streaming; Track listing: 1. "Intro; Breakthrough"; 2. "Siren"; 3. "Nemonade"; 4. "That's It"; 5. "Butterfly"; 6. "Skit; Disharmony #1" | 5 | — | — | — | — | — | KOR: 37,913 | |
| Disharmony: Break Out | Released: April 20, 2021; Label: FNC Entertainment; Formats: CD, digital download, streaming; Track listing: 1. "Scared"; 2. "Reset"; 3. "Pyramid"; 4. "Ayayay"; 5. "End It"; 6. "If You Call Me" | 6 | — | — | — | — | — | KOR: 67,150 | |
| Disharmony: Find Out | Released: January 3, 2022; Label: FNC Entertainment; Formats: CD, digital download, streaming; Track listing: 1. "Do It Like This"; 2. "That'$ Money"; 3. "Follow Me"; 4. "Bop"; 5. "Before the Dawn"; 6. "Peacemaker" | 3 | — | — | — | — | — | KOR: 108,362 | |
| Harmony: Zero In | Released: July 20, 2022; Label: FNC Entertainment, Hello82; Formats: CD, digital download, streaming; Track listing: 1. "Doom Du Doom" (둠두둠); 2. "Black Hole"; 3. "Yes Man"; 4. "Swagger"; 5. "Mirror Mirror"; 6. "Different Song for Me" | 3 | — | — | — | — | — | KOR: 110,870 | |
| Harmony: Set In | Released: November 30, 2022; Label: FNC Entertainment; Formats: CD, digital download, streaming; Track listing: 1. "Back Down"; 2. "BFF (Best Friends Forever)"; 3. "Secret Sauce"; 4. "One and Only"; 5. "Look at Me Now" (태양을 삼킨 아이); 6. "Better Together" (배낭여행) | 5 | — | — | — | — | 14 | KOR: 163,065 | |
| Harmony: All In | Released: June 8, 2023; Label: FNC Entertainment, Hello82; Formats: CD, digital download, streaming; Track listing: 1. "Jump"; 2. "Love Me for Me"; 3. "New Classic"; 4. "More Than Words"; 5. "Heartbeat Drum"; 6. "I Am You" | 3 | — | — | 51 | 11 | 3 | KOR: 272,117; US: 15,000 | KMCA: Platinum |
| Sad Song | Released: September 20, 2024; Label: FNC Entertainment, Hello82; Formats: CD, digital download, streaming; Track listing: 1. "Sad Song"; 2. "It's Alright"; 3. "Last Call"; 4. "Welcome To"; 5. "All You"; 6. "WASP"; 7. "Sad Song" (English version) | 2 | — | — | 16 | 1 | 1 | KOR: 321,454 | KMCA: Platinum |
| Duh! | Released: May 8, 2025; Label: FNC Entertainment; Formats: CD, digital download, streaming; Track listing: 1. "DUH!"; 2. "Pretty Boy"; 3. "Murmur"; 4. "Flashy"; 5. "Over and Over"; 6. "Work" | 1 | — | — | 23 | 3 | 1 | KOR: 444,756 | KMCA: Platinum |
| Unique | Released: March 12, 2026; Label: FNC Entertainment; Formats: CD, digital download, streaming; Track listing: 1. "Unique"; 2. "Pandemonium"; 3. "L.O.Y.L."; 4. "Wednesday Girl"; 5. "Triple 7"; 6. "Ice (VVS)" | 1 | 6 | 19 | 4 | 1 | 1 | KOR: 400,753; JPN: 9,791 | |
| Blow Up | Released: November 6, 2026; Label: FNC Entertainment; Formats: CD, digital download, streaming; Track listing: 1. "Blow Up"; 2. "Element"; 3. "How To"; 4. "Momentum"; 5. "T.O.T.Y."; 6. "Talk That" | 2 | — | — | 4 | 1 | 1 | KOR: 530,025 | |
"—" denotes releases that did not chart or were not released in that region.

==== English EPs ====
| Title | Details | Peak chart positions | | Sales |
| Title | Details | US | US Indie | Sales |
|---|---|---|---|---|
| Ex | Released: September 26, 2025; Label: FNC Entertainment, Hello82; Formats: CD, digital download, streaming | 9 | 2 | US: 39,000 |

=== Singles ===
==== Korean singles ====
| Title | Year | Peak chart positions | Album |
| Title | Year | KOR DL | Album |
|---|---|---|---|
| "Siren" | 2020 | — | Disharmony: Stand Out |
| "Breakthrough" (틀; full version) | 2020 | — | Non-album single |
| "Scared" (겁나니) | 2021 | — | Disharmony: Break Out |
| "Do It Like This" | 2022 | — | Disharmony: Find Out |
| "Doom Du Doom" (둠두둠) | 2022 | 121 | Harmony: Zero In |
| "Back Down" | 2022 | 110 | Harmony: Set In |
| "Jump" | 2023 | 111 | Harmony: All In |
| "Killin' It" (때깔) | 2024 | 20 | Killin' It |
| "Sad Song" | 2024 | 19 | Sad Song |
| "Duh!" | 2025 | 18 | Duh! |
| "Unique" | 2026 | 15 | Unique |
"—" denotes a release that did not chart or was not released in that region.

==== English singles ====
| Title | Year | Peak chart positions | Album |
| Title | Year | US Pop | Album |
|---|---|---|---|
| "Gotta Get Back" (with Pink Sweat$) | 2022 | — | Non-album singles |
| "Super Chic" (with New Hope Club) | 2023 | — | Non-album singles |
| "Fall in Love Again" | 2023 | 27 | Non-album singles |
| "Ex" | 2025 | — | Ex |
"—" denotes a release that did not chart or was not released in that region.

=== Other charted songs ===
| Title | Year | Peak chart positions | Album |
| Title | Year | KOR DL | Album |
|---|---|---|---|
| "Late Night Calls" | 2024 | 113 | Killin' It |
| "Everybody Clap" | 2024 | 115 | Killin' It |
| "Love Story" (꿍꿍이) | 2024 | 110 | Killin' It |
| "Countdown to Love" | 2024 | 112 | Killin' It |
| "Emergency" | 2024 | 115 | Killin' It |
| "2Nite" | 2024 | 123 | Killin' It |
| "Let Me Love You" | 2024 | 119 | Killin' It |
| "Street Star" | 2024 | 118 | Killin' It |
| "I See U" | 2024 | 112 | Killin' It |
| "It's Alright" | 2024 | 47 | Sad Song |
| "Last Call" | 2024 | 49 | Sad Song |
| "Welcome To" | 2024 | 57 | Sad Song |
| "All You" | 2024 | 54 | Sad Song |
| "Wasp" | 2024 | 58 | Sad Song |
| "Sad Song (English Version)" | 2024 | 60 | Sad Song |

== Videography ==
=== Music videos ===
| Title | Year | Director(s) | Note | Ref. |
|---|---|---|---|---|
| "Siren" | 2020 | Seong Wonmo (Digipedi) | Debut Music Video | |
| "Scared" | 2021 | Seong Wonmo (Digipedi) | —N/a | |
| "Do It Like This" | 2022 | Seong Wonmo (Digipedi) | English Version | |
| "Gotta Get Back" | 2022 | Song Ji Wook (Avenew CreativeI) | with Pink Sweat$ | |
| "Doom Du Doom" | 2022 | Seong Wonmo (Digipedi) | —N/a | |
| "Back Down" | 2022 | Seong Wonmo, Moon Seokho (Digipedi) | —N/a | |
| "Super Chic" | 2023 | —N/a | with New Hope Club | |
| "Jump" | 2023 | Seong Wonmo (Digipedi) | —N/a | |
| "Fall In Love Again" | 2023 | Kang Mingi (aarch.film) | Produced by C. "Tricky" Stewart & Believve | |
| "Killin' It" | 2024 | Yuji Shin (Rigend Film) | —N/a | |
| "Sad Song" | 2024 | Yuji Shin (Rigend Film) | —N/a | |

== Filmography ==
=== Movie ===
| Year | Title | Director | Note |
|---|---|---|---|
| 2020 | P1H: The Beginning of a New World | Hong-Seung Yoon | All members; debut movie |

== Concert and tours ==
=== Live Tours ===
- 2022 P1Harmony Live Tour [P1ustage H: Peace]
- 2023 P1Harmony Live Tour [P1ustage H: P1oneer]
- 2024 P1Harmony Live Tour [P1ustage H: Utop1a]
- 2025 P1Harmony Live Tour [P1ustage H: Most Wanted]

== Awards and nominations ==
Name of the award ceremony, year presented, award category, nominee(s) of the award, and the result of the nomination
| Award ceremony | Year | Category | Nominee / Work | Result | Ref. |
|---|---|---|---|---|---|
| Asia Artist Awards | 2021 | Male Idol Group Popularity Award | P1Harmony | Nominated | |
| Brand Customer Loyalty Awards | 2021 | Best Male Rookie Award | P1Harmony | Nominated | |
| Brand of the Year Awards | 2021 | Rookie Male Idol Award | P1Harmony | Nominated | |
| D Awards | 2025 | Delights Blue Award | P1Harmony | Won | |
| D Awards | 2025 | Best Stage | P1Harmony | Won | |
| Korea Grand Music Awards | 2024 | Best Artist | P1Harmony | Won | |
| MAMA Awards | 2021 | Best New Male Artist | P1Harmony | Nominated | |
| MAMA Awards | 2021 | Artist of the Year | P1Harmony | Nominated | |
| MAMA Awards | 2021 | Album of the Year | Disharmony: Break Out | Nominated | |
| MAMA Awards | 2023 | Worldwide Fans' Choice Top 10 | P1Harmony | Nominated | |
| MAMA Awards | 2025 | Fans' Choice Top 10 – Male | P1Harmony | Nominated | |
| MAMA Awards | 2025 | Worldwide KCONER's Choice | "Duh" | Nominated | |
| Seoul Music Awards | 2021 | Rookie of the Year | P1Harmony | Nominated | |
| Seoul Music Awards | 2021 | K-wave Popularity Award | P1Harmony | Nominated | |
| Seoul Music Awards | 2021 | Popularity Award | P1Harmony | Nominated | |
| Seoul Music Awards | 2023 | Hallyu Special Award | P1Harmony | Nominated | |
| Seoul Music Awards | 2023 | Main Award (Bonsang) | P1Harmony | Nominated | |
| Seoul Music Awards | 2023 | Popularity Award | P1Harmony | Nominated | |
| Seoul Music Awards | 2025 | K-pop World Choice – Group | P1Harmony | Nominated | |
| Seoul Music Awards | 2025 | K-Wave Special Award | P1Harmony | Nominated | |
| Seoul Music Awards | 2025 | Popularity Award | P1Harmony | Nominated | |
| Seoul Music Awards | 2025 | Main Award (Bonsang) | P1Harmony | Won | |
