= Delhi 2 Dublin =

Canadian world music group

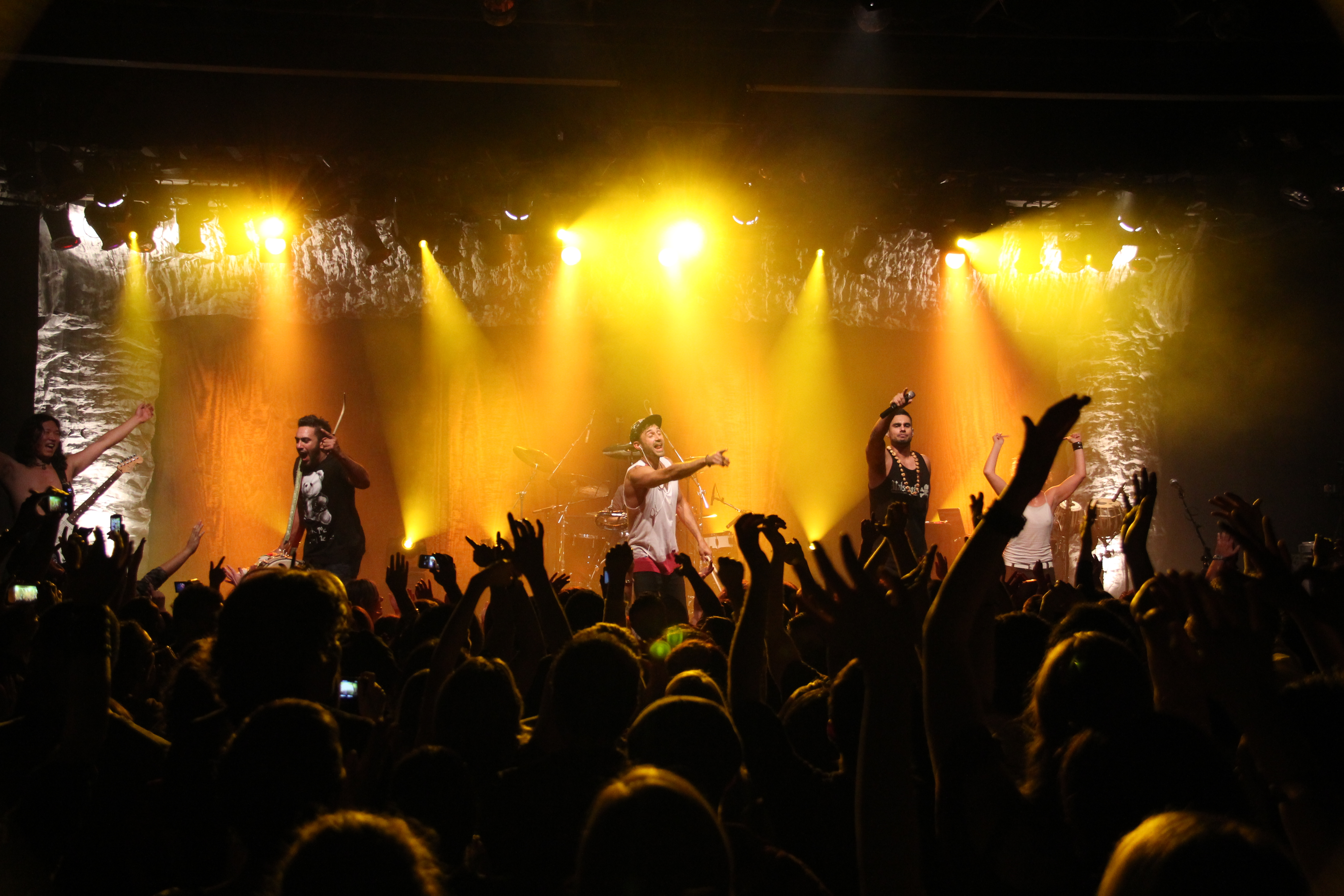
- Delhi 2 Dublin performing in 2012

Background information
- Origin: Vancouver, British Columbia, Canada
- Genres: Bhangra; electronic; funk; dub reggae; hip-hop; Celtic
- Years active: 2006–present
- Labels: CD Baby; Disc Makers; Westwood; Outside
- Members: Tarun Nayar; Sanjay Seran; Ravi Binning
- Past members: Kytami; Oliver Schroer; Adrian Blackhurst; Sara Fitzpatrick
- Website: delhi2dublin.com

Delhi 2 Dublin (sometimes abbreviated as D2D) is a Canadian world music group formed in 2006 in Vancouver who play a fusion of Bhangra, electronic, funk, dub, reggae, hip-hop, Celtic music, and a mashup of other genres.

== History ==
Delhi 2 Dublin was initially formed in 2006 for a one-off performance at CelticFest in Vancouver, Canada. It consisted of Tarun Nayar (tabla, electronics), Sanjay Seran (vocals), violinists Kytami and Oliver Schroer, and Adrian Blackhurst, and the band's sound was a fusion of Bhangra and Celtic music. After a few lineup changes, the band's makeup solidified, with Nayar, Seran, Kytami, and new members Andrew Kim (sitar, guitar), and Ravi Binning (dhol, dholak). Their musical style also shifted, as they've incorporated a mix of dub, reggae, and various dance-oriented genres. The band has toured extensively, both within Canada and overseas.

Delhi 2 Dublin's 2007 debut, self-titled album reached No. 3 on the Canadian world music charts. Most of its lyrics as well as those on subsequent albums, were sung in Punjabi. The following year, they released Delhi 2 Dublin Remixed, which reached No. 1 on the Chart Attack world music chart. Their third album, Planet Electric, once more charted third on the Canadian world music charts. This was followed in 2011 by Planet: Electrified.

In 2014, they issued their first live album, recorded at Vancouver's Commodore Ballroom on the occasion of their eighth birthday. In 2015, the band released their ninth album, titled We're All Desi, on Westwood Recordings. It included contributions from new members James Wallace (guitar) and Serena Eades (violin) and was produced by Nick Middleton of the Funk Hunters. The band's latest album, issued in 2019, is We Got This. In a departure from their previous efforts, most of the lyrics on the album are sung in English.

== Band members ==
Current

- Tarun Nayar – tabla, electronics
- Sanjay Seran – vocals
- Ravi Binning – dhol, dholak

Live performers

- Andrew Kim – electric sitar, guitar
- James Hussain – guitar
- Serena Eades – violin
- Jaron Freeman-Fox – violin, guitar

Past

- Kytami – violin
- Sara Fitzpatrick – violin

== Discography ==
- Delhi 2 Dublin (2008)
- Delhi 2 Dublin: Remixed (2009)
- Planet Electric (2010)
- Planet: Electrified (Remixes) (2011)
- Delhi 2 Dubland EP (2011)
- Turn Up the Stereo (2012)
- Turn Up the Stereo: Remixed (2014)
- Delhi 2 Dublin: Live (2014)
- We're All Desi (2015)
- We're All Desi Remixed (2016)
- We Got This (2019)
