= Area Codes (Kali song) =

2023 single by Kaliii

Single by Kaliii

from the album Toxic Chocolate: Area Codes Edition
- Released: March 17, 2023
- Genre: Hip hop; snap
- Length: 2:19
- Label: Trump Card; Atlantic
- Songwriters: Kaliya Ross; Joshua Goods; Alexus Cokley; Kendall Taylor
- Producers: Tate Kobang; YG! Beats

Kaliii singles chronology
"U Betta" (2022)	"Area Codes" (2023)	"Bad Bitches (Remix)" (2023)

Music video
- "Area Codes" on YouTube

"Area Codes" is a song performed by American rapper Kaliii (known at the time as simply "Kali"), released on March 17, 2023 via Trump Card and Atlantic Recording Corporation. Produced by Tate Kobang and YG! Beats, it interpolates the 2001 song of the same name by Ludacris featuring Nate Dogg. The song gained traction on the video-sharing platform TikTok, following which it became Kali's first song to chart, peaking at number 33 on the Billboard Hot 100. It was included in a reissue of Kaliii's second mixtape Toxic Chocolate, which was labelled the "Area Codes Edition" and released on June 29, 2023.

== Content ==
Lyrically, Kaliii brags about being in many relationships with men and inducing them into giving her cash through her attractiveness, sharing details of her partners and the relationships as well: "Got a white boy on my roster, he be feeding me pasta and lobster / He just hit me up on Tuesday like 'What you doing bae? Let me take you shoppin'". In the chorus, she raps about having "hoes in different area codes", interpolating the Ludacris song while warning some women that their partners or spouses may be in an affair with her. Thus means they could have been having sex together but live far away and are dating other people.

== Music video ==
The official music video was directed by Adonis Blackwood and released on April 6, 2023. It sees Kaliii in a high school, joined by a "flashy clique" and "taking over the halls" as she raps.

== Remixes ==
In June 2023, Kali released an EP containing 5 remixes to the song featuring rappers from various cities: the "773 Remix" with Chicago rapper Mello Buckzz, the "718 Remix" with Bronx rapper Kenzo B, the "415 Remix" with San Francisco rapper Lil Kayla, the "314 Remix" with St. Louis rapper Sexyy Red, and the "850 Remix" with Tallahassee rapper Luh Tyler.

== Charts ==
=== Weekly charts ===
Weekly chart performance for "Area Codes"
Chart (2023)	Peak position
Australia (ARIA)	17
Australia Hip Hop/R&B (ARIA)	6
Canada (Canadian Hot 100)	39
Global 200 (Billboard)	58
Ireland (IRMA)	24
New Zealand (Recorded Music NZ)	25
UK Singles (Official Charts)	38
UK Hip Hop/R&B (Official Charts)	14
US Billboard Hot 100	33
US Hot R&B/Hip-Hop Songs (Billboard)	10
US Mainstream Top 40 (Billboard)	34
US Rhythmic (Billboard)	2

=== Year-end charts ===
Year-end chart performance for "Area Codes"
Chart (2023)	Position
US Billboard Hot 100	88
US Hot R&B/Hip-Hop Songs (Billboard)	27
US Rhythmic (Billboard)	23

== Certifications ==
Certifications for "Area Codes"
Region	Certification	Certified units/sales
Australia (ARIA)	Gold	35,000^{‡}
Canada (Music Canada)	Platinum	80,000^{‡}
United Kingdom (BPI)	Silver	200,000^{‡}
United States (RIAA)	Platinum	1,000,000^{‡}
^{‡} Sales+streaming figures based on certification alone.
