= Reggie 'n' Bollie =

Ghanaian music duo

- Origin: Ghana
- Genres: Pop; hip-hop
- Years active: 2012–present
- Labels: Syco; F.R.O.D Music
- Members: Reggie Zippy; Bollie Babeface

Reggie 'n' Bollie (formerly Menn on Poinnt) are a Ghanaian music duo consisting of Reggie Zippy and Bollie Babeface. They formed in 2012 and are best known for finishing as runners-up on the twelfth series of The X Factor UK in 2015.

== Overview ==
Reggie 'n' Bollie are Reggie Zippy (born Reginald Ainooson, 16 July 1984) and Bollie Babeface (born Ishmael Hamid, 2 July 1986). "Bollie" is an acronym of "Best of Lyrical Lines in Entertainment".

They have been living in the UK with their families since 2010. Reggie released three songs in 2006 called "Virgin", "4 Sale" and "Adoma". In 2004, Bollie also had a hit called "You May Kiss the Bride", which is popular at weddings. In 2017, they were guest presenters for the CBBC music show, The Playlist.

== The X Factor ==
In 2015, Reggie 'n' Bollie (then known as Menn on Poinnt) auditioned for the twelfth series of The X Factor. They made it all the way to judges' houses, where they were mentored by Cheryl Fernandez-Versini and were seen as a shock choice for the live shows. With the eliminations of Alien Uncovered in week 1 and 4th Impact in week 5, Reggie 'n' Bollie became Fernandez-Versini's sole remaining act in the competition. They were never in the bottom two or bottom three during any week and subsequently became the first duo to make the live final since Same Difference in 2007. During the final, they duetted with Fuse ODG and Craig David. They were announced as runners-up in the final, losing out to Louisa Johnson. The duo took part in The X Factor Live Tour 2016.

The X Factor performances and results
Show	Song choice	Theme	Result
Auditions	"Turn It Up"	—N/a	Through to bootcamp
Bootcamp	"All About That Bass"	—N/a	Through to six-chair challenge
Six-chair challenge	"Cheerleader"	—N/a	Through to judges' houses
Judges' houses	"Twist and Shout"	—N/a	Through to live shows
Live show 1	"It Wasn't Me"	This Is Me	Safe (7th)
Live show 2	"What Makes You Beautiful"/"Cheerleader"	Reinvention	Safe (2nd)
Live show 3	"My Heart Will Go On"/"Who Let the Dogs Out?"	Movie week	Safe (5th)
Live show 4	"Shut Up and Dance"/"Dangerous Love"	Love & Heartbreak	Safe (1st)
Quarter-Final	"Watch Me (Whip/Nae Nae)"/"Azonto"	Jukebox	Safe (2nd)
Quarter-Final	"Dynamite"	Judges' choice	Safe (2nd)
Semi-Final	"Locked Away"	Songs to get me to the final	Safe (2nd)
Semi-Final	"I Gotta Feeling"/"I Like to Move It"	Songs to get me to the final	Safe (2nd)
Final	"Spice Up Your Life"/"Boom Boom Boom"	New song	Safe (2nd)
Final	"Dangerous Love"/"Re-Rewind (The Crowd Say Bo Selecta)" (with Fuse ODG and Craig David)	Celebrity duet	Safe (2nd)
Final	"What Makes You Beautiful"/"Cheerleader"/"I Like to Move It"	Song of the series	Runners-up (38.9%)
Final	"Forever Young"	Winner's single	Runners-up (38.9%)

Reggie 'n' Bollie signed to Syco Music on 20 January 2016. They released their first single "New Girl" on 13 May through Syco. It reached number 26 on the UK Singles Chart. Their second single, "Link Up", released on 9 December 2016, failed to chart.

On 1 February 2017, Reggie 'n' Bollie announced they had parted ways with Syco and set up their own independent record label, called F.R.O.D Music. The duo switched on the Christmas lights in Farnborough on 18 November 2017.

On 15 December 2017, Reggie 'n' Bollie released their album Uncommon Favours through F.R.O.D Music.

== Personal life ==
In August 2021, Zippy's mother, Cecilia Ainooson, died after an illness. On 11 August 2023, Zippy's wife, Edith Ward, with whom he shares three children, filed for divorce. On 16 July 2025, Zippy was arrested after Ward allegedly reported him for violating a non-molestation order.

== Discography ==
=== Album ===
- Uncommon Favours (2017)
- CLARITY (2021)

=== Singles ===
Title	Year	Peak chart positions		Certifications	Album
Title	Year	UK	SCO	Certifications	Album
"New Girl"	2016	26	8	BPI: Silver	Uncommon Favours
"Link Up"	2016	—	—		Non-album single
"This Is the Life"	2017	—	—		Uncommon Favours
"Bumaye"	2017	—	—		Uncommon Favours
"—" denotes a recording that did not chart or was not released in that territory.
