= Disharmony: Break Out =

- Digital cover

EP by P1Harmony
- Released: April 20, 2021
- Genre: K-pop
- Length: 19:36
- Language: Korean
- Label: FNC Entertainment

P1Harmony chronology
Disharmony: Stand Out (2020)	Disharmony: Break Out (2021)	Disharmony: Find Out (2022)

Singles from Disharmony: Break Out
- 1. "Scared" Released: April 20, 2021

Disharmony: Break Out is the second extended play by South Korean boy band P1Harmony. It was released by FNC Entertainment under license to Kakao Entertainment on April 20, 2021, including the lead single "Scared". It is the second mini-album of P1Harmony's Disharmony series.

== Composition ==
All members participated in composing the lyrics of the final track, "If You Call Me".

== Commercial performance ==
The EP debuted at number six on the Gaon Album Chart and had sold 67,150 copies by June 2021.

== Track listing ==
Disharmony: Break Out track listing
No.	Title	Lyrics	Music	Arrangement	Length
1.	"Scared" (겁나니)	Han Seong-ho; Jiung; Intak; Jongseob	Han Seong-ho; Tiyon 'TC' Mack; Tesung Kim; Gibum; Moon Kim	Gibum	3:08
2.	"Reset"	Han Seong-ho; Jiung; Intak; Jongseob	Maxx Song; Tiyon 'TC' Mack; Jayrah Gibson; Moon Kim; Tha Aristocrats	Tha Aristocrats	3:15
3.	"Pyramid"	Han Seong-ho; J.Don; Jiung; Intak; Jongseob	Tha Aristocrats; Command Freaks; Jayrah Gibson	Command Freaks; Tha Aristocrats	3:40
4.	"Ayaya"	J.Don	Tha Aristocrats; Tiyon 'TC' Mack; Moon Kim	Tha Aristocrats; Tiyon 'TC' Mack; Moon Kim	2:30
5.	"End It" (끝장내)	Han Seong-ho; Jiung; Intak; Jongseob	Command Freaks; Moon Kim; Tiyon 'TC' Mack	Command Freaks	3:32
6.	"If You Call Me"	P1Harmony	Park Soo-seok; Seo Ji-eun; P1Harmony	Park Soo-seok; Seo Ji-eun	3:28
Total length:					19:36

== Charts ==
Chart performance for Disharmony: Break Out
Chart (2021)	Peak position
South Korean Albums (Circle)	6
