= New Girl (song) =

Single by Reggie 'n' Bollie

from the album Uncommon Favours
- Released: 13 May 2016
- Recorded: 2015
- Genre: Dance-pop
- Length: 3:36
- Label: Syco
- Songwriter(s): Ammar Malik; John Theodore Geiger II; Tom Barnes; Ben Kohn; Peter Kelleher; Nathan Cunningham; Marc Sibley; Cleo Tighe; Pablo Bowman; Daniel Boyle; Sarah Blanchard
- Producer(s): Iain James; LDN Noise; Afterhrs; Space Primates

Reggie 'n' Bollie singles chronology
"New Girl" (2016)	"Link Up" (2016)

Music video
- "New Girl" on YouTube

"New Girl" is the debut single by Ghanaian music duo Reggie 'n' Bollie. It was released on 13 May 2016.

== Music video ==
A music video, shot in Ghana, was uploaded to Vevo on 20 May 2016, and received almost 100,000 views within 48 hours. It features scenes on the beach, the duo playing football with local children, and group dances. It was directed by African music video directors Prince Dovlo and Sesan Ogunro.

== Charts ==
Chart (2016)	Peak position
Ireland (IRMA)	71
Scotland (OCC)	8
UK Singles (OCC)	26

== Certifications ==
Region	Certification	Certified units/sales
United Kingdom (BPI)	Silver	200,000^{‡}
^{‡} Sales+streaming figures based on certification alone.

== Release history ==
Region	Date	Format	Label
United Kingdom	13 May 2016	Digital download	Syco
