= AtHeart =

South Korean girl group

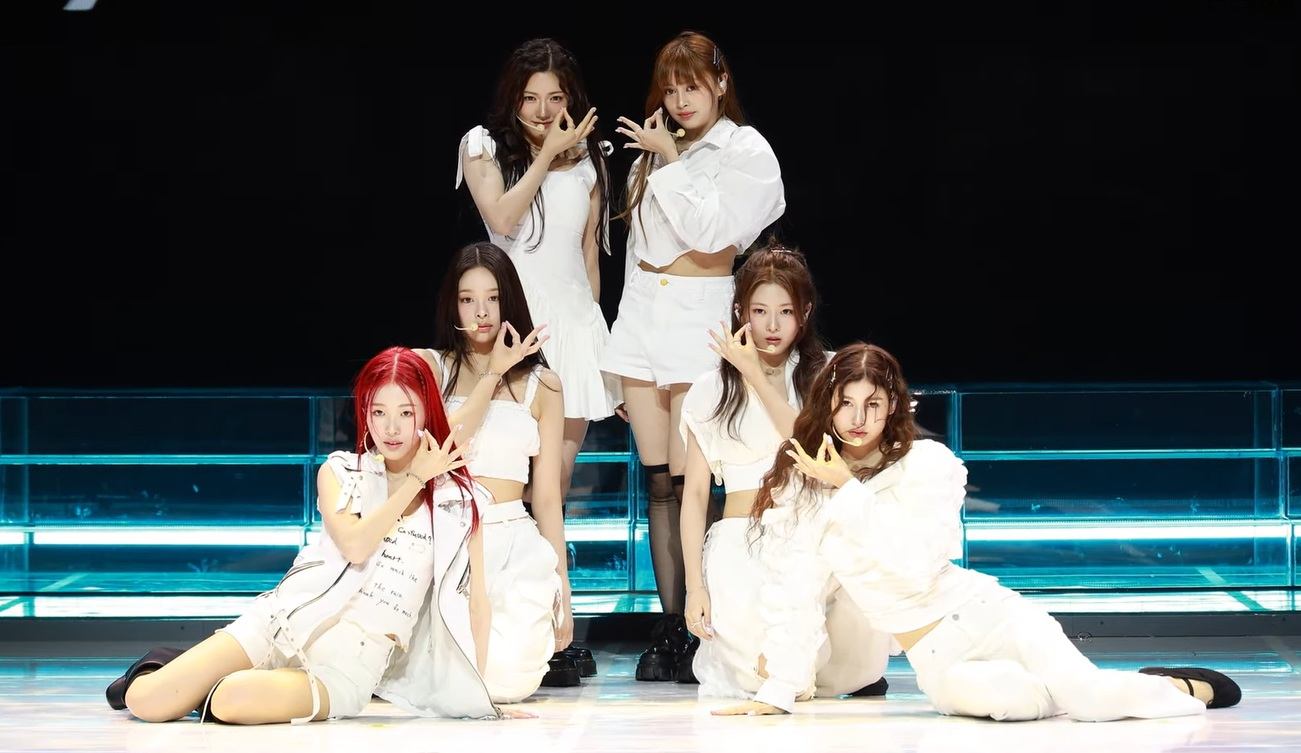
- AtHeart in August 2025 (Note: From left to right (excluding Aurora): Arin, Nahyun, Seohyeon, Katelyn, Bome, and Michi.)

Background information
- Origin: Seoul, South Korea
- Genre: K-pop
- Years active: 2024–present
- Labels: Titan; Republic
- Members: Michi; Arin; Katelyn; Bome; Seohyeon; Aurora; Nahyun
- Website: atheart.me

AtHeart (Korean: 앳하트) is a South Korean girl group formed by American entertainment agency Titan Content. The group is composed of seven members: Michi, Arin, Katelyn, Bome, Seohyeon, Aurora, and Nahyun. They debuted with their first extended play, Plot Twist, on August 13, 2025.

== History ==
=== 2023–2025: Formation and introduction ===
Nikki Semin-Han, who was the former chief executive officer (CEO) of SM Entertainment, revealed American entertainment agency Titan Content on November 28, 2023. They had planned in launching two girl groups with global auditions occurring the next year. After scouting locations, the agency announced on July 16, 2024, that Michi and Sorin were the first members for upcoming South Korean girl group AtHeart. The group name simply indicates their "genuine nature" to have the connection and love between them and their fans, to ensure the empowerment of being authentic.

Maeil Business Newspaper were perplexed for this decision, because individuals and their social media accounts are kept confidential until the group is finalized. Revealing their identities simultaneously was unconventional. Katelyn, Seohyeon, and Aurora were then introduced to the public on November 12 for AtHeart. Although the group became a five-piece ensemble, the agency had more members to recruit before their debut. Three months later, the seven-member group was established, unveiling Nahyun, Arin, and Bome on February 21, 2025. Teen Vogue interviewed them showcasing their influences and strengths; Sorin was later removed from publication as she is no longer debuting with AtHeart.

Titan Content subsequently partnered with Imperial Music, a division from Republic Records, that "makes them the ideal partner for this venture." AtHeart started to upload teasers showcasing their pre-debut song and uploaded a music video titled "Good Girl (AtHeart)" through video sharing platform YouTube on March 14. It was soon released worldwide digitally for music download and streaming on May 29. The same day, Dreamus announced they will exclusively distribute any music release from AtHeart, along with merchandising in South Korea.

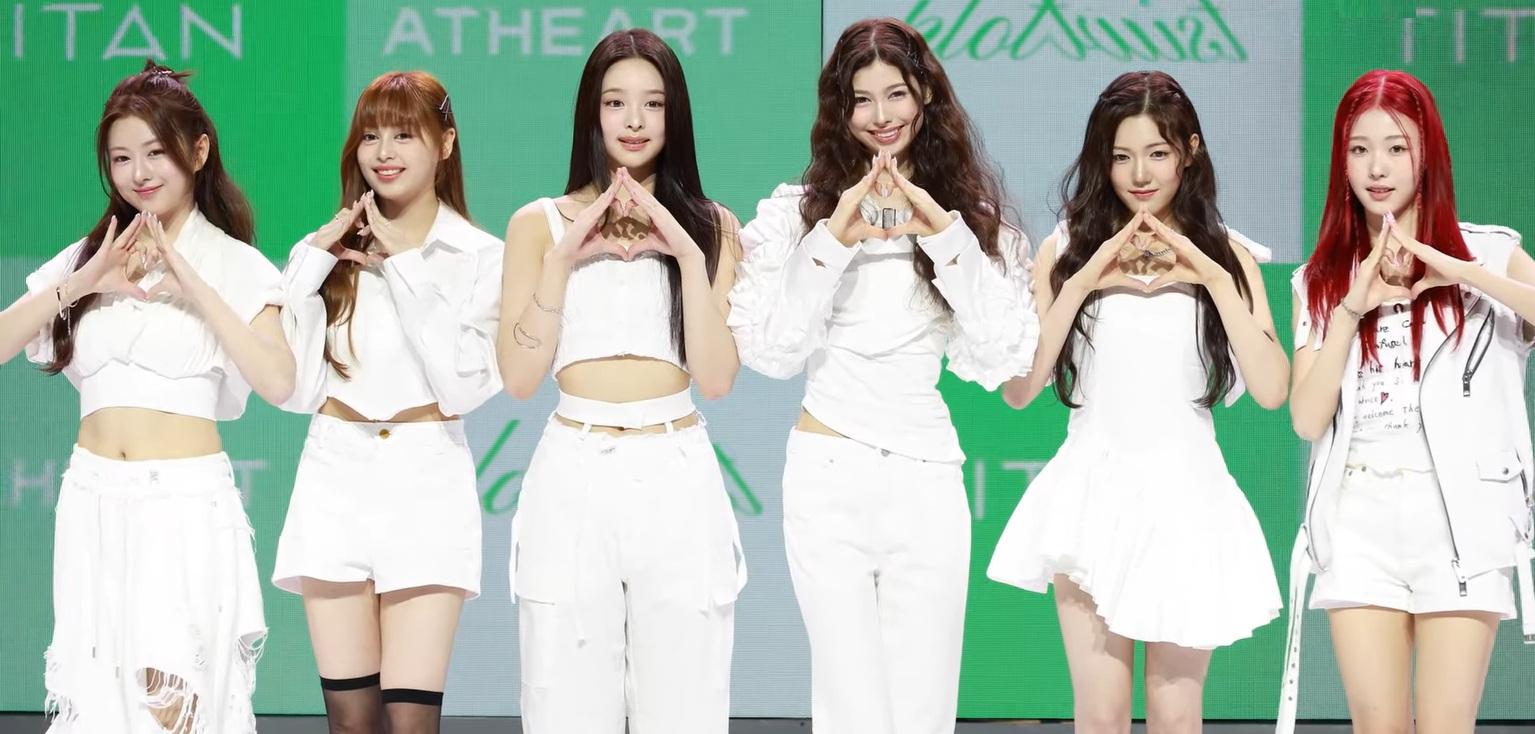
AtHeart debuting their showcase at Blue Square, located in the Yongsan District

A month later, AtHeart confirmed on July 10 they would release their debut extended play (EP) in the upcoming month. While promoting the project, the next day it was announced that Aurora was excluded due to health-related problems. Plot Twist was later released globally on August 13, which includes five songs in its tracklist. A teaser trailer for its title track was uploaded, with singer Choi Soo-young (of Girls' Generation) appearing as a mentor. The same month, AtHeart soon would make their first televised performances through multiple music programs, such as M Countdown, Show! Music Core, and Inkigayo.

Kwon Saebom of Billboard Korea named the group as Rookie of the Month, where she sees them understanding each other's "cultural and linguistic backgrounds" marking their traits as a "defining strength." AtHeart then released an English-language rendition of "Plot Twist" on October 10, along with two remixed versions at the end of the month. Titan Content launched them a promotional tour in the United States, in order to accelerate the group onto the global market. AtHeart later performed and were interviewed by Good Day New York on November 21, becoming one of the first K-pop groups to debut early on U.S. television.

=== 2026–present: Standalone recordings ===
Two months later, a new logo was unveiled and revealed their fandom name as Heartbeats on January 29, 2026. Soon after, two digital singles titled "Shut Up" (February 26) and "Butterfly Doors" (March 11) were released along with its respective music videos. AtHeart had also headlined the 42nd Tokyo Girls Collection making their first debut in Japan for the semiannual fashion festival.

Eventually, the group announced a project to cover two songs from other musical groups, to commemorate their 30th anniversary. "Say It" was released on June 25, as a reinterpretation of "Lovefool" (1996) by Swedish band the Cardigans; this marked the return of group member Aurora. She would then go hiatus again for her health concerns and recovery on August 18. The next day, AtHeart released a remake of "3!4!", a song originally made by co-ed group Roo'ra. A fan signing event was scheduled on September 12, but was postponed due to group member Seohyeon being tested positive for COVID-19 in its prior day.

== Members ==
- Michi (미치)
- Arin (아린)
- Katelyn (케이틀린)
- Bome (봄)
- Seohyeon (서현)
- Aurora (아우로라)
- Nahyun (나현)

== Discography ==
=== Extended plays ===
List of extended plays, showing selected details, with selected chart positions, and sales figures
Title	Details	Peak chart positions	Sales
Title	Details	KOR	Sales
Plot Twist	Released: August 13, 2025; Label: Titan Content; Formats: CD, digital download, streaming	11	KOR: 24,650
"—" denotes a recording that failed to chart, was ineligible for the chart or was not released.

=== Singles ===
List of singles, showing year released, with selected chart positions, and album name
Title	Year	Peak chart positions	Album
Title	Year	KOR	Album
"Good Girl (AtHeart)"	2025	—	Plot Twist
"Plot Twist"	2025	— (Note: "Plot Twist" did not enter the Circle Digital Chart, but peaked at number 125 on the component Download Charts.)	Plot Twist
"Shut Up"	2026	— (Note: "Shut Up" did not enter the Circle Digital Chart, but peaked at number 133 on the component Download Charts.)	Non-album singles
"Butterfly Doors"	2026	— (Note: "Butterfly Doors" did not enter the Circle Digital Chart, but peaked at number 168 on the component Download Charts.)	Non-album singles
"Say It"	2026	— (Note: "Say It" did not enter the Circle Digital Chart, but peaked at number 99 on the component Download Charts.)	Non-album singles
"A Piece of My Heart"	2026	— (Note: "A Piece of My Heart" did not enter the Circle Digital Chart, but peaked at number 156 on the component Download Charts.)	Non-album singles
"3!4!"	2026	— (Note: "3!4!" did not enter the Circle Digital Chart, but peaked at number 42 on the component Download Charts.)	Non-album singles
"—" denotes a recording that failed to chart, was ineligible for the chart or was not released.

== Videography ==
=== Music videos ===
List of music videos, showing year released, and director(s)[note 2]
Title	Year	Director(s)	Ref.
"Good Girl (AtHeart)"	2025	Not credited	
"Plot Twist"	2025	Lee Sanghyun	
"Shut Up"	2026	Not credited	
"Butterfly Doors"	2026	Not credited	
"Say It"	2026	Hankyul Min	
"A Piece of My Heart"	2026	Kang Soonhyun	
"3!4!"	2026	Yeona Jung	

== See also ==
- List of South Korean girl groups

== Footnotes ==
Chart positions and sales figues

Other explanatory notes
