= Kaliii =

American rapper (born 2000)

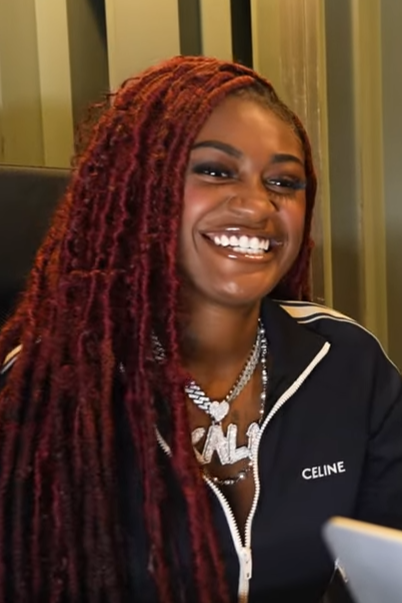
- Kaliii in 2024

Background information
- Born: Kaliya Ashley Ross; July 29, 2000 (age 26); Atlanta, Georgia, US
- Origin: Roswell, Georgia, US
- Genres: Hip hop; trap
- Occupation: Rapper
- Years active: 2019–present
- Labels: Trump Card, LLC; Atlantic

Kaliya Ashley Ross (born July 29, 2000), known professionally as Kaliii (previously known simply as Kali), is an American rapper from Roswell, Georgia. She is best known for her 2023 single "Area Codes", which went viral on the video-sharing platform TikTok before receiving platinum certification by the Recording Industry Association of America (RIAA).

== Career ==
Kaliii began rapping at the age of 12 after an arrangement made with her father to write 13 songs in order to have her own bedroom. In November 2020, she received traction with the popularity of her track "Do a Bitch" on the social media platform TikTok. In 2021, she released her debut mixtape This Why They Mad Now with a remix of her breakthrough song "Do a Bitch" with American rapper Rico Nasty. In November 2021, she released the remix to her song "MMM MMM" with American rappers Latto and Moneybagg Yo. In February 2022, she went on tour alongside rappers Latto, Saucy Santana, and Asianae. On March 8, 2022, she released her single "Standards" in the occasion of the International Women's Day. Also in March 2022, she released her second mixtape Toxic Chocolate with appearances from Latto, Yung Bleu, Moneybagg Yo, Muni Long, Bia, and ATL Jacob. In June 2022, she was selected as part of the 2022 XXL Freshman Class.

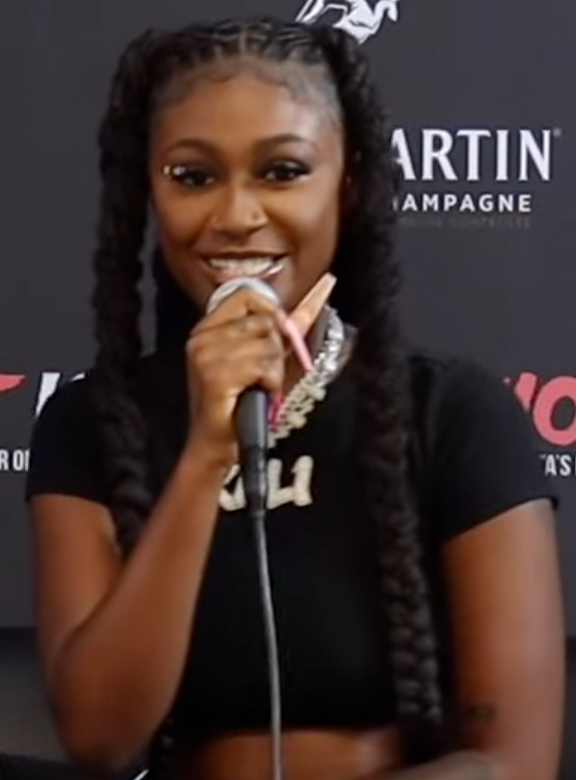
Kaliii in 2022

Starting in 2023, she would stylize her name as Kaliii instead of Kali to match how she typically pronounces her name on her songs. On March 17, 2023, she released the single "Area Codes", that interpolates the song of the same name by Ludacris, which went viral in April 2023. In July 2023, she was part of the Barbie album with the song "Barbie Dreams" with K-pop group Fifty Fifty.

== Musical style ==
During an interview with HipHopDX, Kaliii cited her musical influences as rappers Nicki Minaj and Cardi B, as well as American R&B singer Aaliyah.

== Personal life ==
Kaliii is of Panamanian descent. She welcomed her first child in November 2024 with NFL player Justyn Ross.

== Discography ==
=== Mixtapes ===
Title	Mixtape details
This Why They Mad Now	Released: January 16, 2021; Label: Self-released; Format: Digital download, streaming
Toxic Chocolate	Released: March 18, 2022; Label: Self-released (Note: The "Area Codes Edition" of Toxic Chocolate was released under Atlantic Recording Corporation.); Format: Digital download, streaming

=== EPs ===
Title	EP details
Fck Girl Szn	Released: October 13, 2023; Label: Atlantic; Format: Digital download, streaming

=== Singles ===
==== As lead artist ====
List of singles as lead artist, with selected chart positions
Title	Year	Peak chart positions							Certifications	Album
Title	Year	US	AUS	CAN	IRE	NZ	UK	WW	Certifications	Album
"Oop"	2019	—	—	—	—	—	—	—		Non-album single
"Do a Bitch"	2021	—	—	—	—	—	—	—		This Why They Mad Now (Note: "Do a Bitch" is also included on the "Area Codes Edition" of Toxic Chocolate.)
"Mmm Mmm" (featuring ATL Jacob or remix also featuring Latto and Moneybagg Yo) (Note: The remix of "Mmm Mmm" featuring ATL Jacob, Latto, and Moneybagg Yo is included on Toxic Chocolate. The original version featuring solely ATL Jacob is also included on the "Area Codes Edition" of Toxic Chocolate.)	2021	—	—	—	—	—	—	—		Toxic Chocolate
"UonU" (featuring Yung Bleu)	2022	—	—	—	—	—	—	—		Toxic Chocolate
"Standards"	2022	—	—	—	—	—	—	—		Toxic Chocolate
"Chainzzz" (featuring Muni Long)	2022	—	—	—	—	—	—	—		Toxic Chocolate
"Wet"	2022	—	—	—	—	—	—	—		Non-album singles
"Bout U"	2022	—	—	—	—	—	—	—		Non-album singles
"Area Codes"	2023	33	17	39	24	25	38	58	MC: Platinum; RIAA: Platinum; ARIA: Gold; BPI: Silver	Toxic Chocolate (Note: "Area Codes" is only included on the "Area Codes Edition" of Toxic Chocolate.)
"K Toven" (with DJ Smallz 732)	2023	—	—	—	—	—	—	—		Non-album singles
"Bozo"	2024	—	—	—	—	—	—	—		Non-album singles
"Let It Ring" (with SadBoi)	2024	—	—	—	—	—	—	—		BARE CHAT
"Gas You Up" (featuring Hunxho)	2024	—	—	—	—	—	—	—		Non-album singles
"Big One" (featuring Monaleo)	2024	—	—	—	—	—	—	—		Non-album singles
"Hot Girl Maybach"	2024	—	—	—	—	—	—	—		Non-album singles
"Dat Girl"	2025	—	—	—	—	—	—	—		Non-album singles

==== As featured artist ====
List of singles as featured artist
Title	Year	Album
"Track & Field" (Enchanting featuring Kaliii)	2021	No Luv
"Bad Little Thing" (Remix) (Noa Kirel featuring Kaliii)	2021	Non-album singles
"Y'all Want Me" (Remix) (John'nay Lasha featuring Kaliii)	2023	Non-album singles
"Shiesty" (Finesse2tymes featuring Kaliii and Sexyy Red)	2023	Non-album singles
"Femme Fatale" (G-Eazy featuring Coi Leray and Kaliii)	2024	Freak Show

=== Promotional singles ===
==== As featured artist ====
List of promotional singles as featured artist
Title	Year	Peak chart positions		Album
Title	Year	KOR Down.	NZ Hot	Album
"Barbie Dreams" (Fifty Fifty featuring Kaliii)	2023	81	18	Barbie the Album
