= List of Gaon Digital Chart number ones of 2020 =

The Gaon Digital Chart is a chart that ranks the best-performing singles in South Korea. Managed by the domestic Ministry of Culture, Sports and Tourism (MCST), its data is compiled by the Korea Music Content Industry Association and published by the Gaon Music Chart. The ranking is based collectively on each single's download sales, stream count, and background music use. In mid-2008, the Recording Industry Association of Korea ceased publishing music sales data. The MCST established a process to collect music sales in 2009, and began publishing its data with the introduction of the Gaon Music Chart the following February. With the creation of the Gaon Digital Chart, digital data for individual songs was provided in the country for the first time. Gaon provides weekly (listed from Sunday to Saturday), monthly and yearly charts. Below is a list of singles that topped the weekly and monthly charts.

== Weekly charts ==
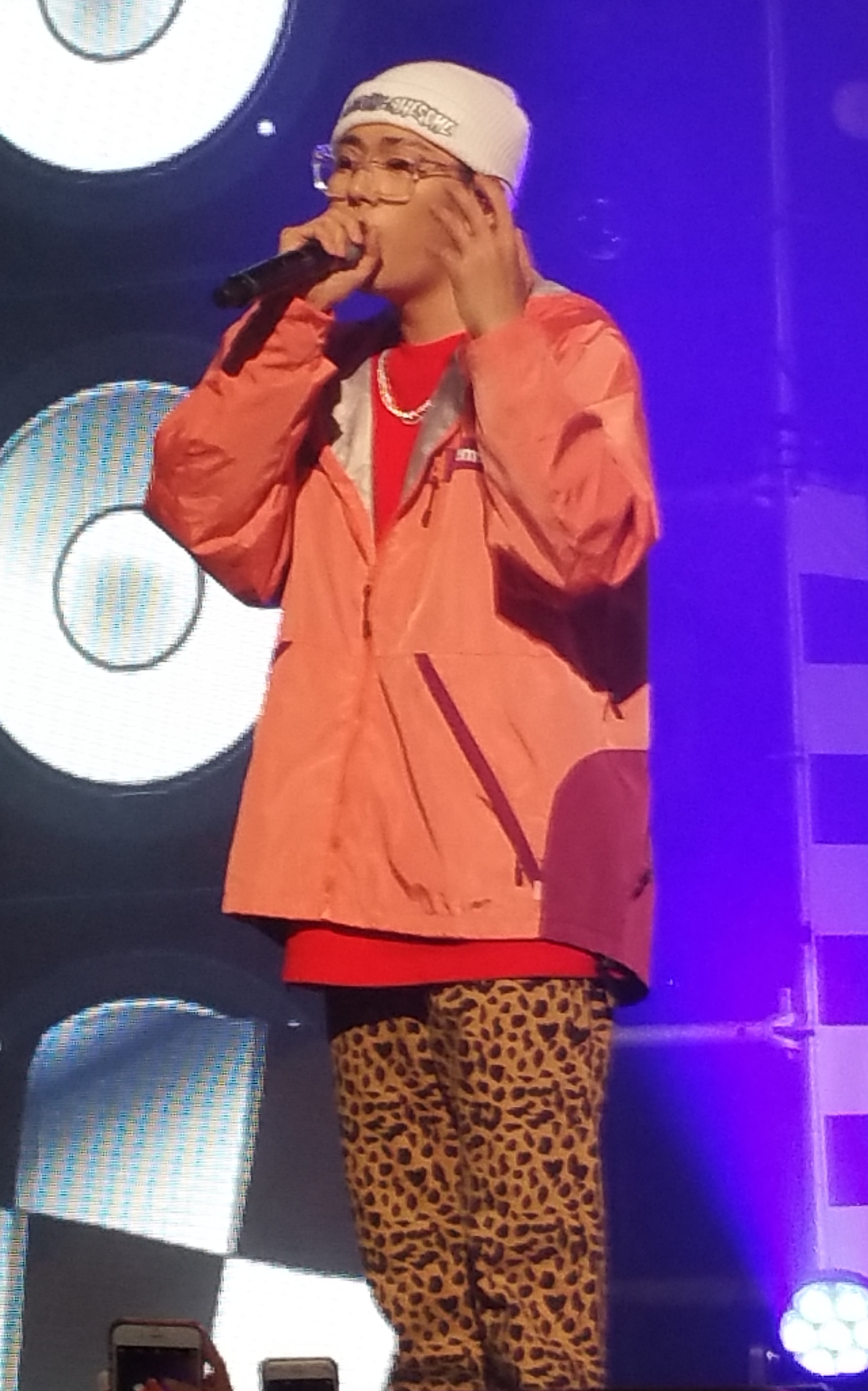
Zico's "Any Song" was the best performing song of February.

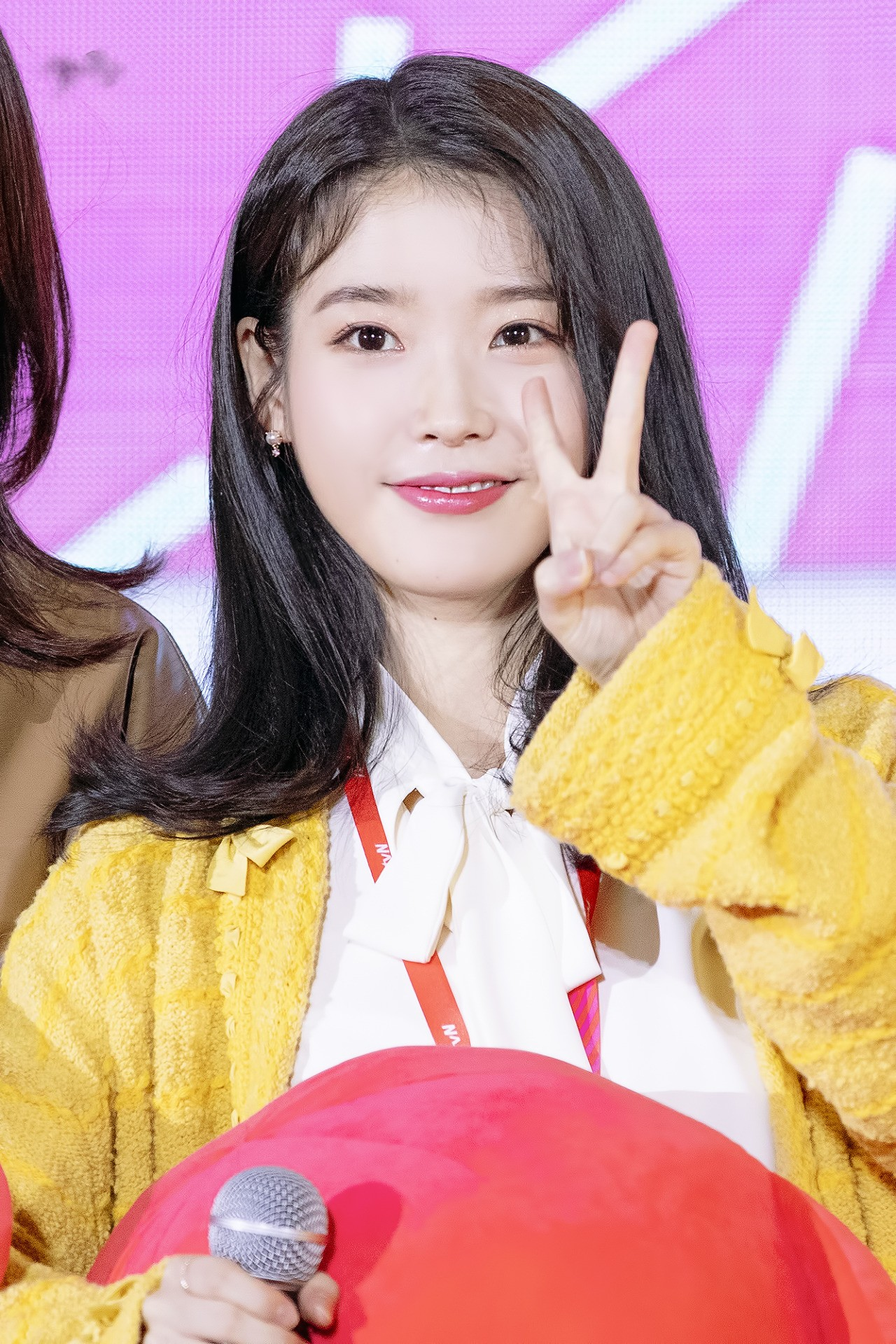
"Eight" by IU featuring Suga was the best performing single of both May and June.

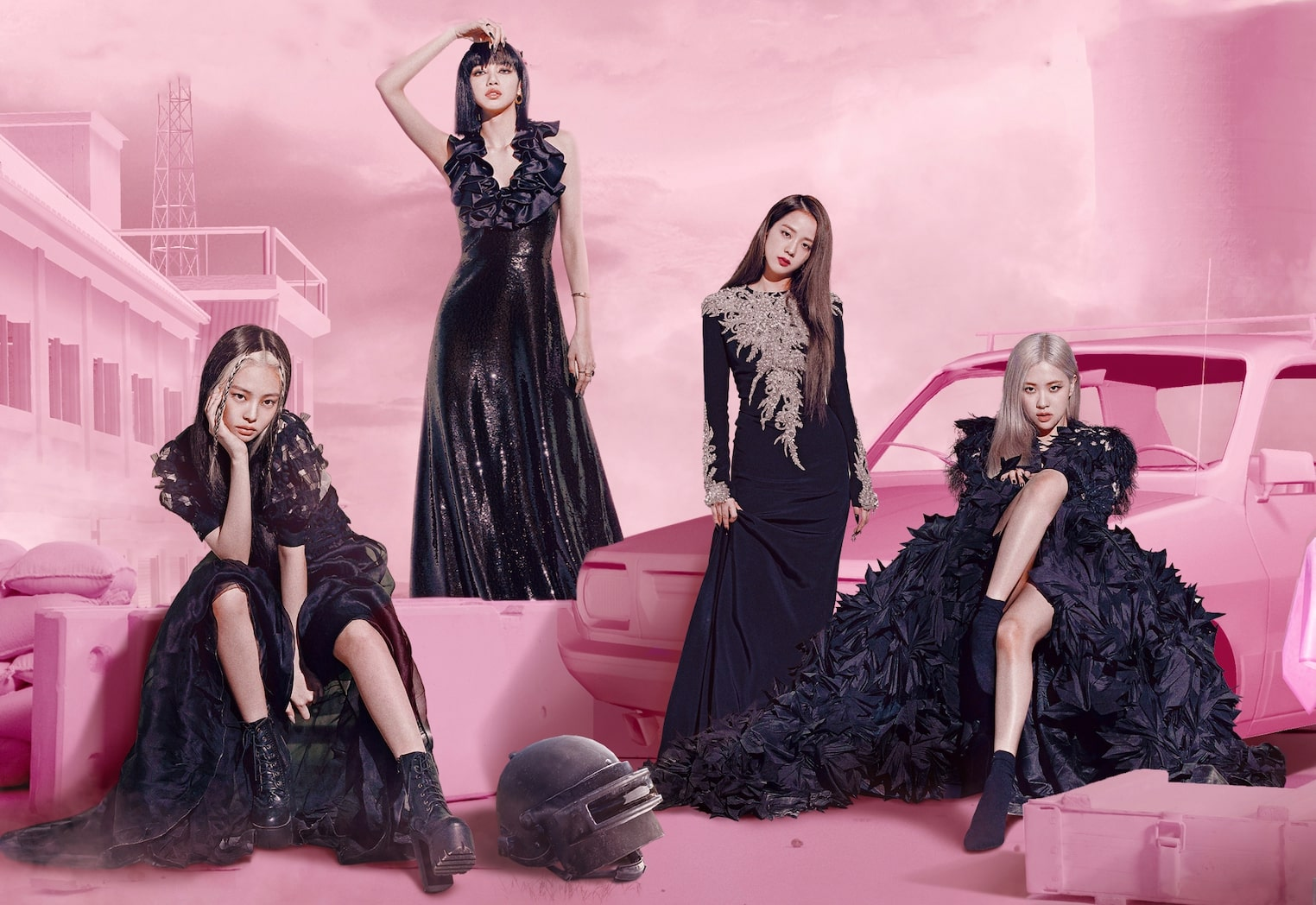
Blackpink's "How You Like That" was the best performing song of July.

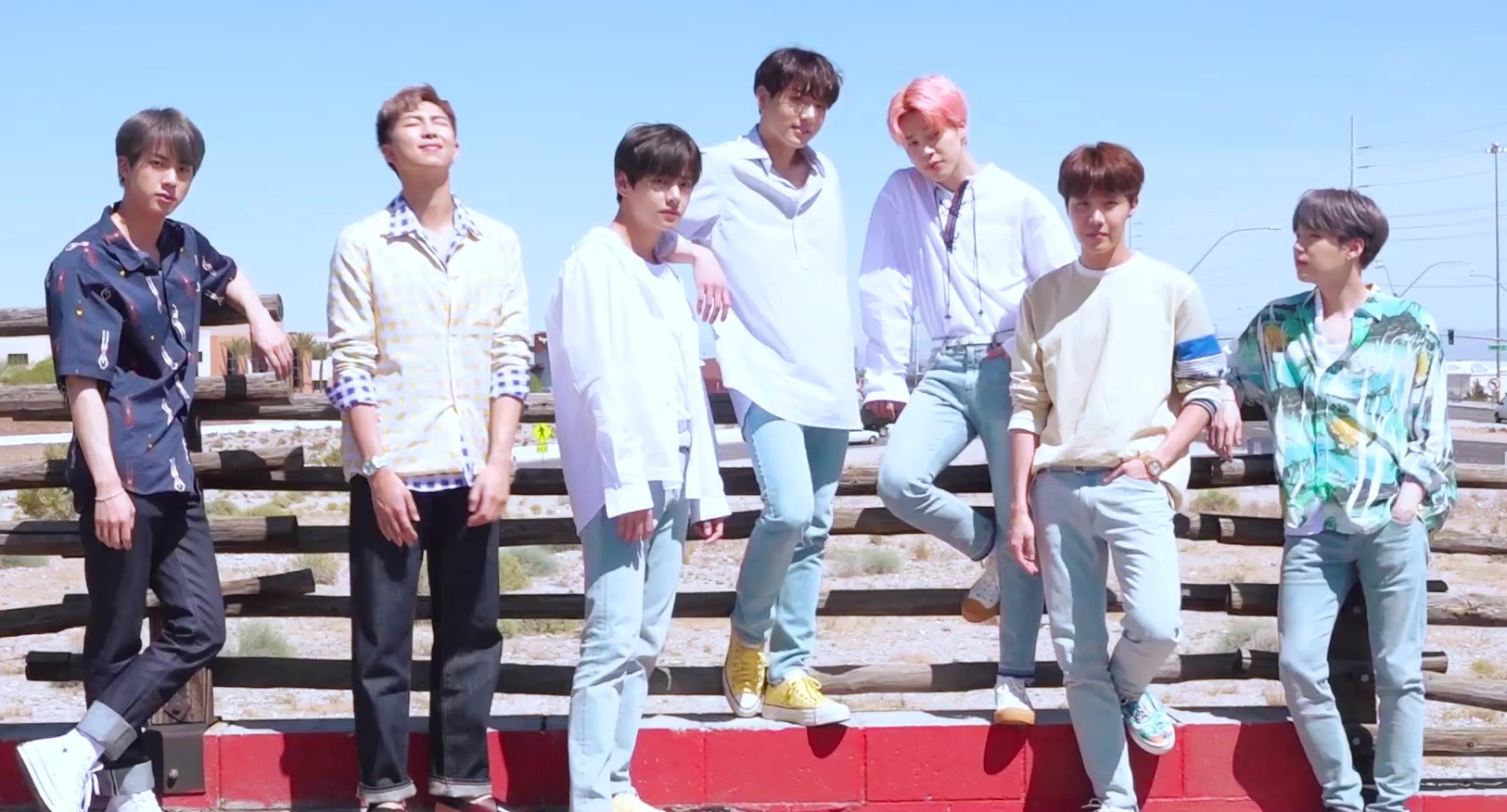
BTS' "Dynamite" was the top song from September to November. It also became the first song to reach 11 weeks at number one as well to reach 3 months at number one

Key
†	Indicates best-performing single of 2020

Week ending date	Song	Artist(s)	Ref.
January 4	"Meteor"	Changmo	
January 11	"Meteor"	Changmo	
January 18	"Any Song" (아무노래) †	Zico	
January 25	"Any Song" (아무노래) †	Zico	
February 1	"Any Song" (아무노래) †	Zico	
February 8	"Any Song" (아무노래) †	Zico	
February 15	"Any Song" (아무노래) †	Zico	
February 22	"Give You My Heart" (마음을 드려요)	IU	
February 29	"On"	BTS	
March 7	"Any Song" (아무노래) †	Zico	
March 14	"Any Song" (아무노래) †	Zico	
March 21	"Start Over" (시작)	Gaho	
March 28	"Start Over" (시작)	Gaho	
April 4	"Bloom" (처음처럼)	MC the Max	
April 11	"Start Over" (시작)	Gaho	
April 18	"Aloha" (아로하)	Jo Jung-suk	
April 25	"Aloha" (아로하)	Jo Jung-suk	
May 2	"Aloha" (아로하)	Jo Jung-suk	
May 9	"Eight" (에잇)	IU featuring Suga	
May 16	"Eight" (에잇)	IU featuring Suga	
May 23	"Eight" (에잇)	IU featuring Suga	
May 30	"I Knew I Love" (사랑하게 될 줄 알았어)	Jeon Mi-do	
June 6	"I Knew I Love" (사랑하게 될 줄 알았어)	Jeon Mi-do	
June 13	"Eight" (에잇)	IU featuring Suga	
June 20	"Downtown Baby"	Bloo	
June 27	"Downtown Baby"	Bloo	
July 4	"How You Like That"	Blackpink	
July 11	"How You Like That"	Blackpink	
July 18	"How You Like That"	Blackpink	
July 25	"Beach Again" (다시 여기 바닷가)	SSAK3	
August 1	"Beach Again" (다시 여기 바닷가)	SSAK3	
August 8	"Beach Again" (다시 여기 바닷가)	SSAK3	
August 15	"Beach Again" (다시 여기 바닷가)	SSAK3	
August 22	"Beach Again" (다시 여기 바닷가)	SSAK3	
August 29	"Dynamite"	BTS	
September 5	"Dynamite"	BTS	
September 12	"Dynamite"	BTS	
September 19	"Dynamite"	BTS	
September 26	"Dynamite"	BTS	
October 3	"Dynamite"	BTS	
October 10	"Dynamite"	BTS	
October 17	"Don't Touch Me"	Refund Sisters	
October 24	"Don't Touch Me"	Refund Sisters	
October 31	"Dynamite"	BTS	
November 7	"Dynamite"	BTS	
November 14	"Dynamite"	BTS	
November 21	"Dynamite"	BTS	
November 28	"VVS"	Mirani, Munchman, Khundi Panda, Mushvenom featuring Justhis	
December 5	"VVS"	Mirani, Munchman, Khundi Panda, Mushvenom featuring Justhis	
December 12	"VVS"	Mirani, Munchman, Khundi Panda, Mushvenom featuring Justhis	
December 19	"VVS"	Mirani, Munchman, Khundi Panda, Mushvenom featuring Justhis	
December 26	"VVS"	Mirani, Munchman, Khundi Panda, Mushvenom featuring Justhis	

== Monthly charts ==
Month	Song	Artist(s)	Ref.
January	"Meteor"	Changmo	
February	"Any Song" (아무노래)	Zico	
March	"Start Over" (시작)	Gaho	
April	"Aloha" (아로하)	Jo Jung-suk	
May	"Eight" (에잇)	IU featuring Suga	
June	"Eight" (에잇)	IU featuring Suga	
July	"How You Like That"	Blackpink	
August	"Beach Again" (다시 여기 바닷가)	SSAK3	
September	"Dynamite"	BTS	
October	"Dynamite"	BTS	
November	"Dynamite"	BTS	
December	"VVS"	Miranni, Munchman, Khundi Panda, Mushvenom featuring Justhis	
