= Earl (Mushvenom album) =

Studio album by Mushvenom
- Released: August 21, 2025
- Genres: K-pop; pop rap
- Length: 30:36
- Label: Kakao
- Producers: Mushvenom; No Identity

Earl (Korean: 얼; RR: Eol; lit. 'Spirit') is the first studio album by South Korean rapper Mushvenom. It was released on 21 August 2025 by Kakao Entertainment. The album marks his return after three years since the release of his 2022 single "Space Muship". The album received mixed reviews from critics.

== Background ==
In an interview with News1, Mushvenom said the album took a long time to come out because he wanted to show various aspects of himself. Also, he chose eol as the theme of the album because it shows the most Korean emotions.

== Promotion ==
Mushvenom promoted his comeback with guerrilla concerts at Gapyeong Rest Area and Ingu Beach on August 9, 2025.

On 26 September 2025, Mushvenom began his first appearance of promotions through KBS's Music Bank. "For a long time" was also first featured in Music Bank on October 31, 2025.

== Music and lyrics ==
Earl consists of 10 tracks with two title tracks: "Spin the wheel" and "I don't know". "Spin the wheel", featuring artist Epaksa, incorporates elements of trot and electronic dance music as well as rage and hyperpop. In contrast, "I don't know" showcases his distinctive musical approach and lyrical composition using the Chungcheong dialect. "For a long time" and "Automatic" feature 2000s dance music with high-pitched synth sounds. "Drop out hop in" features Latin music.

== Music videos ==
On August 25, 2025, the music video for "Spin the wheel" was released through his official YouTube channel. It ranked 1st on YouTube's daily popular music videos and 5th on trending music videos in South Korea.

== Critical reception ==
Professional ratings
Review scores
| Source | Rating |
|---|---|
| IZM | 3/5 stars |
| overtone | 2.5/5 stars |
| Rhythmer | 2.5/5 stars |

Sohn Min-hyun from IZM noted that Earl transcends conventional dance music by reinterpreting it through a distinctly Korean cultural lens, blending traditional folk aesthetics with contemporary production while grounding the work in the emotional depth of Han (한). However, he criticized "Spin the wheel" for lacking detail. Additionally, he noted that in "For a long time" and "Automatic," the artist's distinctive style is obscured by the collaboration with a mixed vocal group.

Jang Jun-young of Rhythmer wrote that "I don't know" and "Drop out hop in" show Mushvenom's strength while "Ding Ding Dang Dang" and "Paye" lack individuality. He also criticized the inconsistent composition and arrangement of the songs.

=== Year-end lists ===
"Spin the wheel" ranked 7th place on Music Y's Single of the Year list.

== Track listing ==
All of the tracks were produced and written by Mushvenom with producer No Identity.

Earl track listing
| No. | Title | Lyrics | Music | Length |
|---|---|---|---|---|
| 1. | "Spin the wheel" (featuring Epaksa (돌림판; Dollimpan)) | Mushvenom | Mushvenom & No Identity | 2:40 |
| 2. | "I don't know" (몰러유; Molleoyu) | | | 2:49 |
| 3. | "For a long time" (featuring Turtles (오랫동안; Oraetdongan)) | | | 3:03 |
| 4. | "Automatic" (featuring Koyote (오토매틱; Otomaetik)) | | | 2:08 |
| 5. | "Ding Ding Dang Dang" (띵띵땡땡; Tting Tting Ttaeng Ttaeng) | | | 3:13 |
| 6. | "Drop out hop in" (날다람쥐; Naldaramjwi; lit. 'Flying Squirrel') | | | 2:41 |
| 7. | "Paye" (빠에; Ppa-e) | | | 3:47 |
| 8. | "Revolution" (오늘날; Oneullal; lit. 'Nowadays') | | | 3:32 |
| 9. | "Monalisa" (모나리자; Monarija) | | | 2:33 |
| 10. | "Earl" (얼; Eol; lit. 'Spirit') | | | 4:06 |
| Total length: | | | | 30:36 |

== Credits and personnel ==
Credits adapted from Melon.

- Alawn at Alawn Music Studios – Mixing (track 1–5)
- Simon Bergseth – Mixing (track 6, 9, 10)
- Nathan Boddy at Farmhouse Studios – Mixing (track 7, 8)
- Dale Becker at Becker Mastering – Mastering (all tracks)
- Mushvenom – Recording (all tracks)
- Sound Kim – Chorus (track 3)
- Park Jung Ho at Titan Studio – Recording (track 3)
- Na Sumin at Bake Sound – Recording (track 4)

== Release history ==
Release history of Earl
| Country | Date | Format | Label |
|---|---|---|---|
| Various | August 21, 2025 | Digital download; streaming | Kakao |
