= Mushvenom =

South Korean rapper (born 1994)

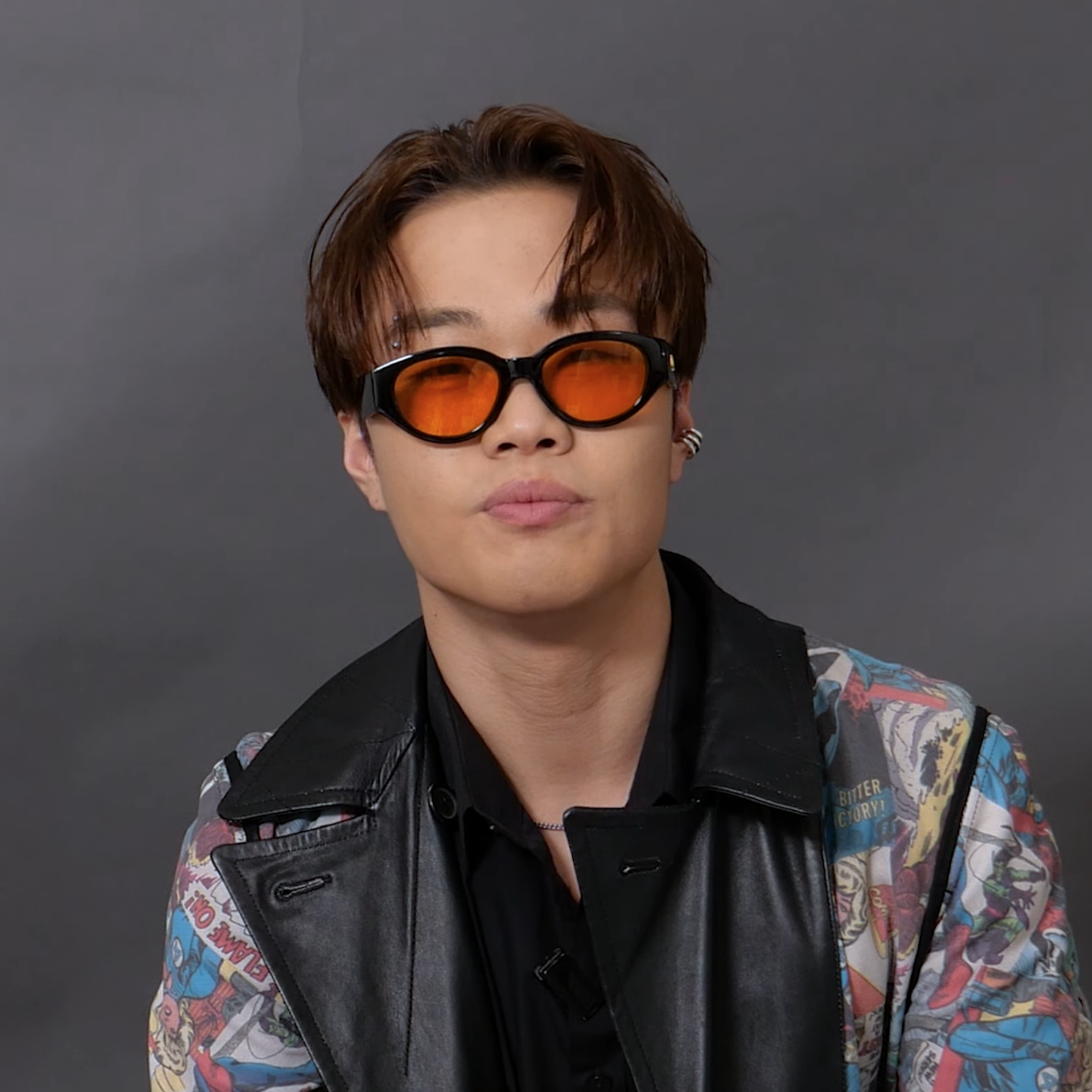
- Mushvenom for Marie Claire Korea in 2021

Background information
- Born: Lee Tae-min; June 20, 1994 (age 32); Daedeok, Daejeon, South Korea
- Genre: Hip hop
- Occupation: Rapper
- Years active: 2019-present

Lee Tae-min (Korean: 이태민; born June 20, 1994), known professionally as Mushvenom (머쉬베놈; stylized in all caps), is a South Korean rapper. He is known for his humorous lyrics and for using the Chungcheong dialect in his rap.

Mushvenom first garnered attention when he appeared on Show Me the Money 8 in 2019. His debut single, "Why Are You So Noisy?", was met with critical acclaim. In 2020, he appeared on Show Me the Money 9 and finished in second place. "VVS", a single he released on the show, peaked at number one on the Gaon Digital Chart and won Hip-hop Track of the Year at the Korean Hip-hop Awards.

== Early life and education ==
Lee Tae-min was born on June 20, 1994, in Daedeok, Daejeon. He began rapping as a hobby when he was in the second year of high school. He graduated from Kukje University of Arts with an associate degree in applied music.

He adopted the stage name "Mushvenom" as it sounds similar to "cool guy" (멋이 밴 놈; meosi baen nom) in Korean.

== Career ==
=== 2019: Show Me the Money 8 and "Why Are You So Noisy?" ===
In July 2019, Mushvenom appeared on Show Me the Money 8, where he first gained attention. He was eliminated in round six (the producer crew battle). In September 2019, he released his debut single "Why Are You So Noisy?", which was nominated for Best Rap Song at the Korean Music Awards and Hip-hop Track of the Year at the Korean Hip-hop Awards. In November 2019, he released the single "Let Me Know", which was ranked in sixth place in Music Y's 2019 Single of the Year list. In December 2019, he released the single "Nice Head", which was nominated for Best Rap Song at the Korean Music Awards.

=== 2020: Show Me the Money 9 and "VVS" ===
In October 2020, Mushvenom appeared on Show Me the Money 9 where he released "VVS" with Mirani, Munchman, and Khundi Panda. It became his most successful single, charting at number 1 on the Gaon Digital Chart for seven consecutive weeks and winning Hip-Hop Track of the Year at the Korean Hip-hop Awards. He also released singles "Tricker", "Godok", "Go", and "The Beauty of Void" on the show and finished in second place. He was ranked in second place in Music Y's 2020 Rookie of the Year list.

=== 2025: Earl ===
In August 2025, Mushvenom released his first studio album Earl featuring Epaksa, Turtles and Koyote. "Spin the Wheel", a song on the album, was nominated for Collaboration of the Year at the Korean Hip-hop Awards.

== Artistry ==
Mushvenom is known for his "humorous lyrics, witty rhymes, and ear-catching Chungcheong accent". In an interview with Inven, he cited his family as his biggest influence. He also gets inspiration from dramas such as Taejo Wang Geon, films, and comedy shows.

== Discography ==
=== Studio albums ===
Title	Details	Peak chart positions
Title	Details	KOR
Earl (얼)	Released: August 21, 2025; Label: Kakao; Formats: CD, digital download	—

=== Singles ===
Title	Year	Peak chart position	Certification	Album
Title	Year	KOR	Certification	Album
"Why Are You So Noisy?" (왜 이리 시끄러운 것이냐)	2019	—		Non-album singles
"Let Me Know" (알려 좀 주쇼)	2019	—		Non-album singles
"Nice Head" (버르장멋)	2019	—		Non-album singles
"Came" (왔다)	2020	—		Non-album singles
"Let's See" (보자보자)	2020	—		Non-album singles
"VVS" (with Mirani, Munchman, Khundi Panda featuring Justhis)	2020	1	KMCA: Platinum	Show Me the Money 9 Episode 1
"Tricker" (부어라 비워라)	2020	29		Show Me the Money 9 Episode 3
"Godok" (고독하구만) (featuring Superbee)	2020	21		Show Me the Money 9 Semi Final
"Go" (가다) (featuring Simon Dominic and The Quiett)	2020	42		Show Me the Money 9 Final
"The Beauty of Void" (여백의 미) (featuring Jessi and Justhis)	2020	32		Show Me the Money 9 Final
"Take It" (옜다) (with Justhis)	2021	74		G+Jus
"Space Muship" (안될 것도 되게 하래서 되게 했더니만 됐다고 하네)	2022	—		Non-album singles

== Filmography ==
=== TV ===
Year	Title	Role	Ref.
2019	Show Me the Money 8	Contestant	
2020	Show Me the Money 9	Contestant (Runner-up)	

== Awards and nominations ==
Award	Year	Nominee	Category	Result	Ref.
Melon Music Awards	2021	"VVS"	Song of the Year	Nominated	
Korean Music Awards	2020	"Why Are You So Noisy?"	Best Rap Song	Nominated	
Korean Music Awards	2021	"Nice Head"	Best Rap Song	Nominated	
Korean Hip-hop Awards	2020	Himself	New Artist of the Year	Nominated	
Korean Hip-hop Awards	2020	"Why Are You So Noisy"	Hip-hop Track of the Year	Nominated	
Korean Hip-hop Awards	2021	"VVS"	Hip-hop Track of the Year	Won	
Korean Hip-hop Awards	2021	"VVS"	Collaboration of the Year	Nominated	
Korean Hip-hop Awards	2026	"Spin the Wheel"	Collaboration of the Year	Nominated	
Korean Hip-hop Awards	2026	"Spin the Wheel"	Music Video of the Year	Nominated	
