= Why Are You So Noisy? =

Single by Mushvenom
- Released: September 5, 2019
- Genre: Hip hop
- Length: 2:05
- Composer(s): Slo, Mushvenom
- Lyricist(s): Mushvenom

Mushvenom singles chronology
"Why Are You So Noisy?" (2019)	"Let Me Know" (2019)

Music video
- "Why Are You So Noisy?" on YouTube

"Why Are You So Noisy?" (Korean: 왜 이리 시끄러운 것이냐) is the debut single of South Korean rapper Mushvenom. It was self-released on September 5, 2019. It was later nominated for Best Rap Song at the Korean Music Awards.

During the 1-on-1 crew battle of Show Me the Money 8, Mushvenom performed the hook of "Why Are You So Noisy?" His performance attracted a lot of attention from rappers and hip hop fans. On a simple keyboard loop, Mushvenom raps "clever" lyrics like those of a pansori singer with a flow based on the Chungcheong dialect.

== Critical reception ==
Rhythmer wrote that the song is a "solid project of a rookie who made the strongest impression in 2019". Kim Seung-ri of the Korean Music Awards claimed that it is a "refreshing and pleasant song that we missed out on because it was too close to us". Netizen voters of the Korean Hip-hop Awards commented that Mushvenom "showed a style that has never been seen before with his unique flow".

=== Year-end lists ===
Publication	List	Rank	Ref.
Rhythmer	10 Best Korean Rap Songs of 2019	8	

== Awards and nominations ==
Award	Year	Category	Result	Ref.
Korean Hip-hop Awards	2020	Hip-hop Track of the Year	Nominated	
Korean Music Awards	2020	Best Rap Song	Nominated	
