= Mirani (rapper) =

South Korean rapper (born 1996)

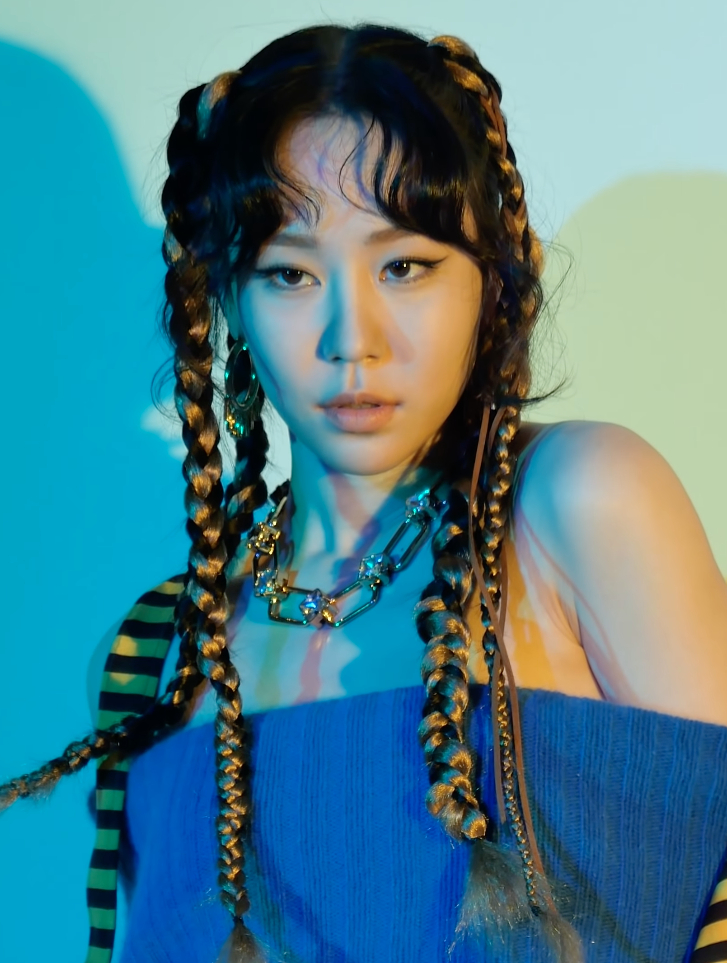
- Mirani in 2022

Background information
- Born: Kim Yoon-jin; May 14, 1996 (age 30)
- Genre: Hip hop
- Occupations: Rapper; songwriter
- Years active: 2020–present
- Label: At Area
- Member of: TDYA

Kim Yoon-jin (Korean: 김윤진; born May 14, 1996), known professionally as Mirani (Korean: 미란이), is a South Korean rapper and songwriter. She first garnered attention when she appeared on the rap competition TV show Show Me the Money 9 in 2020. She released the single "VVS" with rappers Munchman, Khundi Panda, and Mushvenom on the show which peaked at number 1 on the Gaon Digital Chart and won Hip-hop Track of the Year at the Korean Hip-hop Awards.

She signed to hip hop label At Area in 2021 where she released her extended play Uptown Girl. She released her debut album The Drift on May 9, 2023.

== Early life and education ==
Kim Yoon-jin was born on May 14, 1996. She graduated from Ewha Womans University with a bachelor's degree in fashion industry.

She adopted the stage name "Mirani" from the character Mori Ran (known as Yoo Miran in South Korea) from the Japanese manga Case Closed.

== Career ==
=== 2018–2020: Career beginnings and Show Me the Money ===
In 2018, Mirani began uploading her music onto SoundCloud, starting with her debut track "Blank". In April 2020, Mirani released her debut single "The Detective". In October, she appeared on the rap competition TV show Show Me the Money 9 where she released the single "VVS" with rappers Munchman, Khundi Panda, and Mushvenom. It became her most successful single, ranking at number 1 on the Gaon Digital Chart for seven consecutive weeks and winning Hip-Hop Track of the Year at the Korean Hip-hop Awards. She also released singles "Achoo" featuring pH-1 and "Part Time" featuring Queen Wa$abii for the show and finished in the Top 8.

=== 2021–2022: At Area and first EP ===
In March 2021, Mirani signed with At Area, a hip-hop label founded by the record producer duo GroovyRoom after working with them on Show Me the Money 9. She then released her first single album "Daisy" under the label on April 7, 2021. In May, she featured on Coogie's single "Up&Down" with Penomeco. On June 1, she released single "Ramirani" with actress Ra Mi-ran and donated the profits for COVID-19 relief. Her next single "Heat" featuring Lil Boi and Wonstein was released on the June 16. In August, Mirani was featured on Jmin's album Homecoming for the track "Don't Worry" alongside High School Rapper's Park Hyeon-jin.

On November 10, she released single "Lambo!" featuring Uneducated Kid. The track was included in her extended play Uptown Girl, released on November 30. On December 4, Mirani appeared in the final episode of Show Me the Money 10, joining contestant Since on stage for her single "Sign". On December 12, Mirani appeared on King of Masked Singer as a contestant with the stage name "Game of Go" and was eliminated in the first round.

On February 9, 2022, Mirani featured on the song "Hero" (stylized in all caps) for Kim Museum's album Blue Forest. On February 15, Mirani released the single "Can't Slow Me Down" with Lil Boi and Groovy Room for the first-person tactical hero shooter online game Valorant. In the same year, she released singles "Pick Up Your Phone", "Gasoline", "Freaky", and also featured on Kim Jong-kook and KCM's collaborative single "I Luv U".

In July, Mirani featured in the song "Phantom" on rapper Huh's album 926. In August, she featured on SMMT's album Mr. Hollywood on the track "Dream to Dream" with Loco. In September, Mirani and Sik-K featured on the song "Whistle" by Groovy Room for the Street Man Fighter. On October 6, Mirani collaborated with Groovy Room and labelmate Gemini to release the song "Rollin'" for esports club Gen.G Also in October, Mirani featured on the Trade L's song "Click" (stylized in all caps) for the album Love Maze. In November, she featured on BIGONE's album BIGONEISTHENAME on the track "Still the Same".

=== 2023–present: Debut album and second EP ===
On February 24, 2023, Mirani participated in Spotify Singles project Han, featuring in the song "Seoul City" alongside producer duo Saewoo and rappers Kid Milli and Loopy. She then released single "Asphalt" featuring pH-1 on March 10. On May 9, she released her first full-length album titled The Drift. The album has double title tracks "Bad Boy" featuring Big Naughty and "Candy" featuring Leellamarz and Coogie. In June, she released the single "End the Night" as part of the soundtrack of the television series Battle for Happiness. In July, she featured on the song "Starry Night" for Soyou's extended play Summer Recipe. On November 14, Mirani released single "Kiss Me Now".

On July 26, 2024, Mirani featured on Jay Park's single "Xtra McNasty" alongside seven other artists. On August 7, she released single "Hit Me Up" featuring Ateez member Mingi. On September 9, she released the extended play Me Time (stylized in all caps) with title track "Falling Down" featuring Wonstein. The EP also features American rapper Tyla Yaweh and The Quiett and includes previous releases "Kiss Me Now" and "Hit Me Up".

On July 16, 2025, Mirani was revealed as a participant in YouTube channel Studio USOG's web variety show Another Day of Debut Training. Through the show, Mirani debuted as a member of TDYA on August 14 with the single "Keep the Light", composed by singer-songwriter Ejae and written by Mirani herself. On August 15, the group performed the song for the first time at Gwanghwamun Square in Jongno-gu, Seoul in a set of performances celebrating the 80th National Liberation Day of Korea.

== Discography ==
=== Albums ===
| Title | Details | Peak chart positions |
| Title | Details | KOR |
|---|---|---|
| The Drift | Released: May 9, 2023; Label: At Area, Warner Music; Formats: CD, digital download, streaming; Track listing: 1. "Intro"; 2. "Bad Boy" (featuring Big Naughty); 3. "1, 2. 3 Go Shoot" (featuring Blasé and Rei Ami); 4. "WOW"; 5. "Asphalt" (featuring. pH-1); 6. "Ya"; 7. "Interlude"; 8. "Candy" (featuring Leellamarz and Coogie); 9. "Make U Mine"; 10. "Test Me"; 11. "I Hate You" (featuring Sumin) | 83 |

=== Extended plays ===
| Title | Details | Peak chart positions |
| Title | Details | KOR |
|---|---|---|
| Uptown Girl | Released: November 30, 2021; Label: At Area, Warner Music; Formats: CD, digital download, streaming | 62 |
| Me Time | Released: September 11, 2024; Label: At Area, Warner Music; Formats: CD, digital download, streaming; Track listing: 1. "Gets Me Hot" (featuring Tyla Yaweh and The Quiett); 2. "Falling Down" (featuring Wonstein); 3. "Hit Me Up" (featuring Mingi of Ateez); 4. "Kiss Me Now"; 5. "LVSNG" | — |

=== Singles ===
| Title | Year | Peak chart positions | Certifications | Album |
| Title | Year | KOR | Certifications | Album |
|---|---|---|---|---|
| "The Detective" (명탐정; Myeongtamjeong) (feat. Make a Movie) | 2020 | — | | Non-album singles |
| "Eleven" (feat. 372) | 2020 | — | | Non-album singles |
| "Tic Tac!" | 2020 | — | | Non-album singles |
| "VVS" (with Munchman, Khundi Panda, Mushvenom, feat. Justhis) | 2020 | 1 | KMCA: Platinum | Show Me the Money 9 Episode 1 |
| "Achoo" (Feat. pH-1, Haon) | 2020 | 5 | | Show Me the Money 9 Episode 3 |
| "Part Time" (Feat. Queen Wa$abii) | 2020 | 175 | | Show Me the Money 9 Semi Final |
| "Daisy" (Feat. pH-1) | 2021 | 110 | | Daisy |
| "Ramirani" (라미란이) (with Ra Mi-ran) | 2021 | — (Note: "Ramirani" did not enter the Gaon Digital Chart but charted at number 68 on the Gaon Download Chart.) | | Non-album singles |
| "Heat" (with Lil Boi and Wonstein) | 2021 | 136 | | Non-album singles |
| "Lambo!" (Feat. Uneducated Kid) | 2021 | — (Note: "Lambo!" did not enter the Gaon Digital Chart but charted at number 92 on the Gaon Download Chart.) | | Uptown Girl |
| "Tikita" (티키타) (Feat. Lil Boi) | 2021 | — (Note: "Tikita" did not enter the Gaon Digital Chart but charted at number 94 on the Gaon Download Chart.) | | Uptown Girl |
| "Can't Slow Me Down" (with Lil Boi and GroovyRoom) | 2022 | — | | Non-album singles |
| "Pick Up Your Phone" | 2022 | — (Note: "Pick Up Your Phone" did not enter the Gaon Digital Chart but charted at number 114 on the Gaon Download Chart.) | | Non-album singles |
| "Gasoline" | 2022 | — (Note: "Gasoline" did not enter the Gaon Digital Chart but charted at number 126 on the Gaon Download Chart.) | | Non-album singles |
| "Freaky" | 2022 | — (Note: "Freaky" did not enter the Gaon Digital Chart but charted at number 156 on the Gaon Download Chart.) | | Non-album singles |
| "Rollin'" (with Gemini) | 2022 | — (Note: "Rollin'" did not enter the Gaon Digital Chart but charted at number 181 on the Gaon Download Chart.) | | Non-album singles |
| "Seoul City" (with Kid Milli, Loopy, sAewoo) | 2023 | — | | HAN 2023 |
| "Asphalt" (featuring pH-1) | 2023 | — (Note: "Asphalt" did not enter the Circle Digital Chart but charted at number 169 on the Circle Download Chart.) | | The Drift |
| "Bad Boy" (featuring Big Naughty) | 2023 | — (Note: "Bad Boy" did not enter the Circle Digital Chart but charted at number 120 on the Circle Download Chart.) | | The Drift |
| "Candy" (featuring Leellamarz and Coogie) | 2023 | — | | The Drift |
| "Kiss Me Now" | 2023 | — | | Me Time |
| "Hit Me Up" (featuring Mingi of Ateez) | 2024 | — | | Me Time |
| "Falling Down" (featuring Wonstein) | 2024 | — (Note: "Bad Boy" did not enter the Circle Digital Chart but charted at number 79 on the Circle Download Chart.) | | Me Time |
"—" denotes releases that did not chart or were not released in that region.

=== As featured artist ===
| Title | Year | Peak chart positions | Album |
| Title | Year | KOR | Album |
|---|---|---|---|
| "Up&Down" (Coogie featuring Mirani and Penomeco) | 2021 | — (Note: "Up&Down" did not enter the Gaon Digital Chart but charted at number 103 on the Gaon Download Chart.) | I Got A Feeling |
| "Sign" (Since featuring Mirani) | 2021 | 69 | Show Me the Money 10 Final |
| "G999" (Moonbyul featuring Mirani) | 2021 | — (Note: "G999" did not enter the Gaon Digital Chart but charted at number 28 on the Gaon Download Chart.) | 6equence |
| "I Luv U" (Kim Jong Kook with KCM featuring Mirani) | 2022 | 96 | Non-album single |
| "Whistle" (GroovyRoom featuring Mirani and Sik-K) | 2022 | 143 | Street Man Fighter Original Vol.3 |
| "Starry Night" (Soyou featuring Mirani) | 2023 | — (Note: "Starry Night" did not enter the Circle Digital Chart but charted at number 140 on the Circle Download Chart.) | Summer Recipe |
| "Baby" (Polodared featuring Mirani) | 2024 | — | Non-album singles |
| "Xtra McNasty" (Jay Park featuring Jessi, Awich, Milli, Ramengvrl, Lil Cherry, Mirani, Maliibu Miitch, and Camo) | 2024 | — (Note: "Xtra McNasty" did not enter the Circle Digital Chart, but debuted and peaked at number 76 on the Circle Download Chart) | Non-album singles |
"—" denotes releases that did not chart or were not released in that region.

=== Soundtrack appearances ===
| Title | Year | Album |
|---|---|---|
| "End The Night" | 2023 | Battle for Happiness (Original Soundtrack) |
| "Baby Back Home" (featuring Leellamarz) | 2023 | Street Woman Fighter 2 (SWF2) Crew Songs |

=== Other charted songs ===
| Title | Year | Peak chart positions | Album |
| Title | Year | KOR | Album |
|---|---|---|---|
| "Achoo Remix" (GroovyRoom & Justhis feat. Mirani, pH-1, Munchman, Skinny Brown, Louie, Leellamarz, Ourealgoat, Dbo, Sik-K, Owen, Kid Milli, Swings, Nudeboi Seo, TRADE L, Coogie, Blase, sokodomo, Khundi Panda, Lil Moshpit & Khakii) | 2021 | 109 | G+Jus |
| "P.S". (featuring Jay Park) | 2021 | — (Note: "P.S." did not enter the Gaon Digital Chart but charted at number 185 on the Gaon Download Chart.) | Uptown Girl |
| "Daisy Remix" (featuring Paul Blanco and Ash Island) | 2021 | — (Note: "P.S." did not enter the Gaon Digital Chart but charted at number 131 on the Gaon Download Chart.) | Uptown Girl |
"—" denotes releases that did not chart or were not released in that region.

=== Songwriting credits ===
All songwriting credits are adapted from the Korea Music Copyright Association's database, unless otherwise noted.

List of songs written by Mirani for other artists
| Title | Year | Artist | Album |
|---|---|---|---|
| "Playground" (featuring Y0ung Kid, Since, JudgeJ, 372, 5NLi, and O'day O$a) | 2018 | Endo Kim | Non-album single |
| "We Higher" | 2022 | GroovyRoom, Lil Boi, Blasé, Roh Yun Ha, Polodared, Chillin Homie, Fleeky Bang | Show Me the Money 11 Episode 1 |
| "Vroom" (featuring Lil Boi and Swings) | 2022 | Roh Yun Ha | Show Me the Money 11 Semi Final |
| "Say Moo" | 2025 | Ifeye | Sweet Tang |
| "Keep the Light" (꺼지지 않는 빛) | 2025 | TDYA | Non-album single |

== Filmography ==
=== TV ===
| Year | Title | Role | Notes | Ref. |
|---|---|---|---|---|
| 2020 | Show Me the Money 9 | Contestant | Placed in the Top 8 | |
| 2021 | King of Mask Singer | Contestant | Episode 335 | |

=== Web series ===
| Year | Name | Role | Ref. |
|---|---|---|---|
| 2025 | Another Day of Debut Training | Herself | |

== Awards and nominations ==
Name of the award ceremony, year presented, category, nominee of the award, and the result of the nomination
| Award ceremony | Year | Category | Nominee / Work | Result | Ref. |
|---|---|---|---|---|---|
| Korean Hip-hop Awards | 2021 | Hip-hop Track of the Year | "VVS" | Won | |
| Korean Hip-hop Awards | 2021 | Collaboration of the Year | "VVS" | Nominated | |
