= Jung Sung-jae =

South Korean entrepreneur (born 1967)

- 정성재
- Born: October 1967 (age 58); South Korea
- Education: Bachelor of Science, Master of Science
- Alma mater: Hanyang University
- Occupation: Businessman
- Known for: Founding Classys

Jung Sung-jae (Korean: 정성재; born October 1967) is a South Korean entrepreneur and former dermatologist. He is the founder and former chief executive officer of Classys, a medical aesthetics device manufacturer, and a co-creator of Dr. Jart+. Forbes estimated his net worth at US$760 million in 2025.

== Early life and education ==
Jung Sung-jae was born in October 1967. He attended Hanyang University, where he earned a bachelor's and master's degree in medicine.

== Career ==
=== Medical career ===
In 2002, he began serving as the director of Soft Touch Dermatology Clinic (소프터치 피부과).

=== Classys ===
In 2007, while still working as a dermatologist, Jung founded Classys. The company began to develop medical devices, with a focus on skin care.

In 2017, Classys went public on the KOSDAQ.

In 2022, Bain Capital Private Equity acquired a 60.84% stake in Classys for 670 billion Korean won. Jung and his family collectively sold their majority stake while retaining approximately 12.93% ownership in the company.

== Personal life ==
Jung is married to Lee Yeon-joo. They have two children.
