= Classys =

South Korean medical device company

Classys Inc.
- Company type: Public
- Traded as: KRX: 214150
- Industry: Medical devices
- Founded: 2007
- Founder: Jung Sung-jae
- Area served: Worldwide
- Key people: Baek Seung-han (CEO)
- Website: www.classys.com

Classys Inc. (Korean: 클래시스) is a South Korean medical device company headquartered in Seoul, South Korea. It was founded in 2007 by dermatologist Jung Sung-jae and specializes in non-invasive skin care and aesthetic treatment technologies. As of 2025, Classys exports its devices to over 60 countries.

== History ==
In 2007, while still working as a dermatologist, Jung Sung-jae founded Classys. The company began to develop medical devices, with a focus on skin care.

In 2017, Classys went public on the KOSDAQ through a special-purpose acquisition company merger.

In 2022, Bain Capital Private Equity acquired a 60.84% stake in Classys for 670 billion Korean won.
