= Uptown Girl (EP) =

EP by Mirani
- Released: November 30, 2021
- Length: 21:28
- Language: Korean
- Label: At Area; Warner Music

Singles from Uptown Girl
- 1. "Lambo!" Released: November 10, 2021

Uptown Girl (stylized in all caps) is the first extended play of South Korean rapper Mirani. It was released on November 30, 2021, through At Area.

== Background ==
Prior to the release of the EP, Mirani explained the name "Uptown Girl" was paradoxical and opposite to her own life experiences.

== Singles ==
"Lambo!" was released on November 10, 2021. It charted at number 92 on the Gaon Download Chart.

== Critical reception ==
Lee Hong-hyeon of IZM rated Uptown Girl 3 out of 5 stars.

Lim Dong-yeop of IZM rated "Lambo!" 3.5 out of 5 stars.

== Track listing ==
No.	Title	Lyrics	Music	Arrangement	Length
1.	"Uptown Girl"	Mirani	Mirani; GroovyRoom; Purple; Moon Sujin	GroovyRoom; Purple	3:20
2.	"Tikita" (티키타) (featuring Lil Boi)	Mirani; Lil Boi	Mirani; Bronze	Bronze	3:07
3.	"Too Boring" (지겨워서 만든 노래; Jigyeowoseo Mandeun Norae) (featuring Skinny Brown)	Mirani; Skinny Brown	Mirani; Boycold	Boycold	3:06
4.	"Lambo!" (featuring Uneducated Kid)	Mirani; Uneducated Kid	Mirani; Boycold	Boycold	3:09
5.	"P.S." (featuring Jay B)	Mirani; Defsoul	Mirani; Jintae Ko; Charlie Snyder; Sofia Quinn; Dom Perfetti; Defsoul; GroovyRoom	Jintae Ko; Charlie Snyder; Sofia Quinn; Dom Perfetti; GroovyRoom	2:42
6.	"I Wanna Be" (난 진짜 멋지게; Nan Jinjja Meotjige)	Mirani	Mirani; Kwaca	Kwaca; D!em	2:51
7.	"Daisy Remix" (featuring Paul Blanco and Ash Island)	Mirani; Paul Blanco; Ash Island	Kontrabandz; Mirani; Paul Blanco; Ash Island; Moon Sujin; GroovyRoom	Kontrabandz; GrooyRoom	3:09
Total length:					21:28

== Charts ==
Chart (2021)	Peak position
South Korean Albums (Gaon)	62
