= Khundi Panda =

South Korean rapper (born 1997)

Khundi Panda 쿤디판다
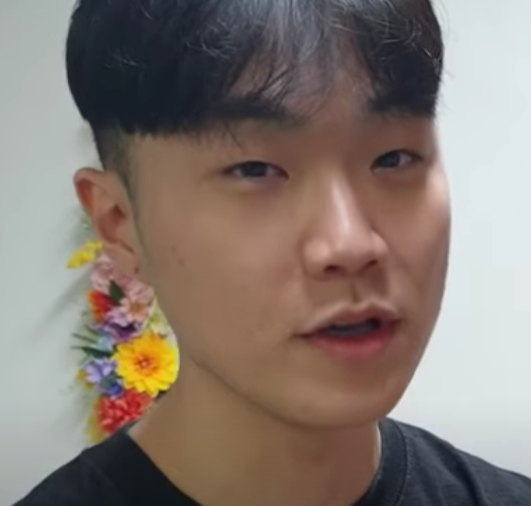
- Khundi Panda in 2021

Background information
- Born: Bok Hyeon; February 11, 1997 (age 29)
- Genres: Hip hop
- Occupation: Rapper
- Years active: 2017–present
- Label: Dejavu Group
- Website: Devaju - Khundi Panda

Bok Hyeon (Korean: 복현; born February 11, 1997), known professionally as Khundi Panda (Korean: 쿤디판다), is a South Korean rapper and songwriter. He released collaborative album Reconstruction with record producer Viann in 2017 and his debut studio album Garosawk in 2020. Both albums won Best Rap Album at the Korean Music Awards. In 2020, he appeared on Show Me the Money 9 and gained popularity. "VVS", a song he released on the show, peaked at number one on the Gaon Digital Chart and won Hip-hop Track of the Year at the Korean Hip-hop Awards.

== Early life ==
Bok Hyeon became interested in music after listening to Epik High's songs. He adopted the stage name "Khundi Panda" from a fictional character that he made after reading fantasy novels and comic books.

== Career ==
In 2017, Khundi Panda released his debut single "Ms. 808". He released collaborative album Reconstruction with record producer Viann in the same year, which later won Best Rap Album at the Korean Music Awards. In 2019, he signed to Dejavu Group, a label found by Bewhy.

In July 2020, he released his debut studio album Garosawk, which later won Best Rap Album at the Korean Music Awards. In October 2020, he appeared on Show Me the Money 9 where he released "VVS" with Mirani, Munchman, and Mushvenom. It became his most successful single, charting at number 1 on the Gaon Digital Chart for seven consecutive weeks and winning Hip-Hop Track of the Year at the Korean Hip-hop Awards. He also released singles "The Roots" and "Hero" on the show and was eliminated in the semi-final. In 2021, he released his second studio album The Spoiled Child which received critical acclaim.

== Discography ==
=== Studio albums ===
Title	Details	Peak chart position
Title	Details	KOR
Garosawk (가로사옥)	Released: July 26, 2020; Label: Dejavu Group; Format: LP, CD, digital download	74
The Spoiled Child: 균	Released: November 29, 2021; Label: Dejavu Group; Format: CD, digital download	86

=== Collaboration album ===
Title	Details
Reconstruction (재건축; jaegeonchuk) (with Viann)	Released: November 25, 2017; Label: SuperFreak; Format: Digital download

=== Singles ===
Title	Year	Peak chart position	Certification	Album
Title	Year	KOR	Certification	Album
"VVS" (with Mirani, Munchman, Mushvenom featuring Justhis)	2020	1	KMCA: Platinum	Show Me the Money 9 Episode 1

== Filmography ==
=== TV ===
Year	Title	Role	Ref.
2020	Show Me the Money 9	Contestant	

== Awards and nominations ==
Award	Year	Nominee	Category	Result	Ref.
Korean Music Awards	2018	Reconstruction	Best Rap Album	Won	
Korean Music Awards	2021	Garosawk	Best Rap Album	Won	
Korean Music Awards	2021	"Nevercomanie"	Best Rap Song	Nominated	
Korean Hip-hop Awards	2021	Garosawk	Hip-hop Album of the Year	Nominated	
Korean Hip-hop Awards	2021	"VVS"	Hip-hop Track of the Year	Won	
Korean Hip-hop Awards	2021	"VVS"	Collaboration of the Year	Nominated	
Korean Hip-hop Awards	2022	Himself	Artist of the Year	Nominated	
