= Dr. Jart+ =

South Korean skin care brand

Dr. Jart+ 닥터자르트
- Founded: 2004; 22 years ago
- Founder: Lee Jin-wook
- Headquarters: Seoul, South Korea
- Area served: Worldwide
- Products: Skin care
- Revenue: ▲US$500 million (2019)
- Parent: Have & Be; Estée Lauder Companies
- Website: drjart.com

Dr. Jart+ (Korean: 닥터자르트; read simply as Doctor Jart) is a South Korean skin care brand. It was founded in 2004 by Lee Jin-Wook, with consultation from dermatologist Jung Sung-jae.

== History ==
In 2003, Lee Jin-Wook (Korean: 이진욱) began research on BB cream. To further develop his product, he reached out to Dr. Jung Sung-jae (Korean: 정성재), who was testing new treatments for patients with severe skin issues. Lee asked Jung to invest in his product to bring Jung's formulations to a wider audience. The name "Jart" was initially coined as a portmanteau of "Jung" and "art". Jung remains the brand's chief dermatologist.

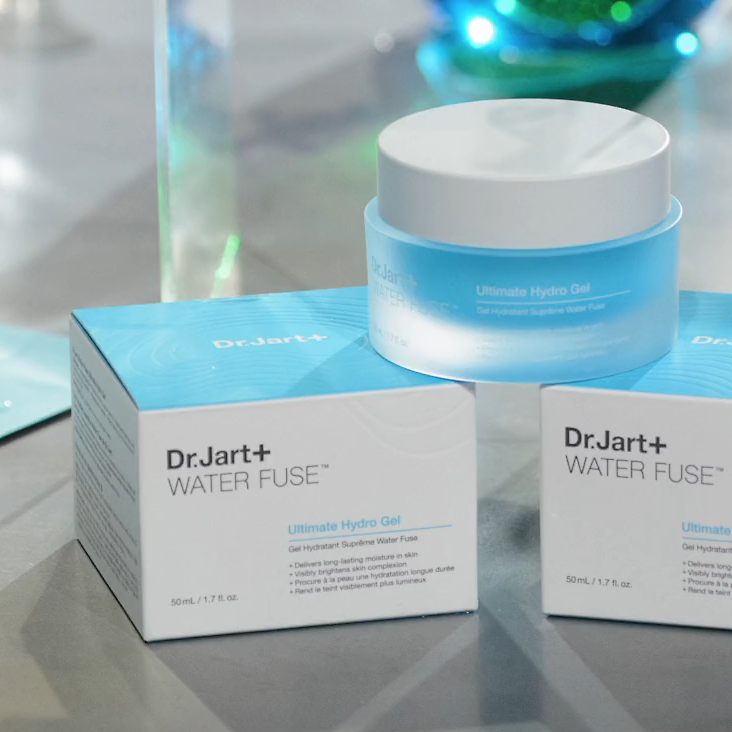
A product from Dr. Jart+'s Water Fuse collection on display.

Dr. Jart+ was in development for three years before being launched into dermatological clinics. It was officially launched for commercial use in December 2004. Dr. Jart+ was first sold through e-commerce sites. Its revenue in 2005 amounted to 500 million won (around $4.725million, in 2005). By 2008, sales had reached seven billion won.

In the early days of Dr. Jart+, Lee focused mostly on exporting Dr. Jart+ from Asia, theorizing that the brand's popularity in Asian territories would translate to success in other regions. The brand partnered with the Japanese department store Takashimaya in June 2009 to offer its products at the store's now-defunct Fifth Avenue location. This move made Dr. Jart+ the second Korean brand since Amorepacific to have a presence in New York. It entered the American market in early 2011 in partnership with cosmetics retailer Sephora, offering two BB creams at ten of its then-locations. The brand has since expanded to sell 50 products at Sephora outlets globally.

== Products ==
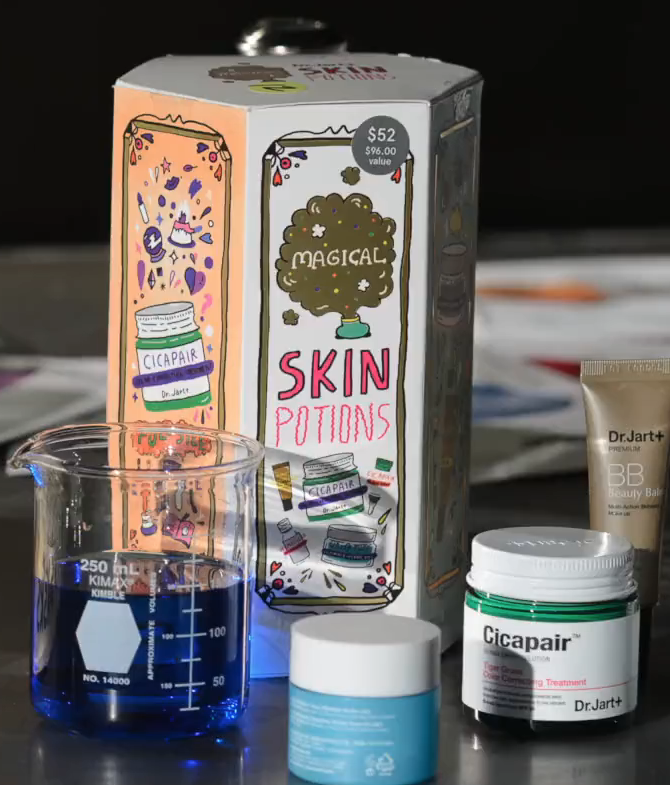
A Dr. Jart+ gift set featuring an assortment of samples from its Cicapair and BB Cream lines.

Dr. Jart+ is composed of nine lines, each focused on a specific ingredient or skin issue:

- Cicadae — utilizes tiger grass (centella asiatica) to "calm redness and soothe irritation"
- Ceramiden — 5-Cera Complex (ceramides) to "restore and repair the skin barrier"
- Water Fuse — Aqua Mineral Complex (minerals) to impart skin hydration
- BB Cream — "beauty balm"
- Dermaclear — Hydrogen Bio Water (micellar solution) to cleanse and exfoliate skin
- Water Drop — hyaluronic acid; features a "unique emulsion system" that "bursts into tiny water droplets"
- Peptide — 8-Peptide Complex (peptides)
- Focuspot — patches composed of "micro tips" to target specific conditions
- V7 — V7 Multi-Vitamin Complex (vitamin B3, C, F, K3, B5, E, and H)
- Cryon Rubber — with patented technology to moisturize and intensely soothe

== Brand identity ==
Dr. Jart+ is considered to be one of the brands that led the Korean beauty wave. It avoids celebrity endorsements in favor of its own animations to communicate a sense of wittiness. In 2018, its branding and packaging was refreshed, starting with its newly created Ceramidin line.

According to Ju Rhyu, a business-to-business consultant, Dr. Jart+ already has a "very clear brand identity" and is therefore keen to downplay the K-beauty angle.

== Spokespersons and models ==
- 2009: Moon Chae-won
- 2014: Jang Hee-jin
- 2017: Han Hye-jin
- 2025: Ifeye
- 2026: Yoonchae Jeong
