= VVS (song) =

Single by Mirani, Munchman, Khundi Panda, Mushvenom
- Language: Korean
- Released: November 21, 2020
- Genre: Hip hop
- Length: 5:35
- Label: Stone Music Entertainment; Genie Music
- Composers: GroovyRoom; Justhis; Sik-K
- Lyricists: Justhis; GroovyRoom; Sik-K; Mirani; Munchman; Khundi Panda; Mushvenom

Music video
- "VVS" on YouTube

"VVS" is a song by South Korean rappers Mirani, Munchman, Khundi Panda, and Mushvenom. It was released on November 21, 2020, through Stone Music Entertainment. It peaked at number one on the Gaon Digital Chart for seven consecutive weeks and won Hip-hop Track of the Year at the Korean Hip-hop Awards.

A remix of the track, titled "VVS (H1ghr Remix)", was released on January 12, 2021, through H1ghr Music, Indigo Music, and Mushvenom. It was performed by pH-1, Big Naughty, Trade L, Woodie Gochild, Jay Park, and Kidd King.

== Music and lyrics ==
As VVS stands for very very slightly included on the diamond clarity scale, the rappers of "VVS" sing energetically about their lives that will shine bright like a diamond after overcoming hardship and failure. They wrote realistic lyrics that reflect young adults' fear for the future such as "Said I'll get you out of the bar / Girl at rock bottom / Mama's liquor bottles made me who I am / Hungry but I clench my teeth."

== Awards and nominations ==
"VVS" won Hip-hop Track of the Year at the Korean Hip-hop Awards. According to netizens, it is "an experimental track that has influence and persuasion" with "the clear presence of GroovyRoom's beat and the rappers' verses". It was also thought to be "a song that gave many people hope."

"VVS" was also nominated for Collaboration of the Year at KHA. According to netizens, it is "the best group song of the year proven by its amazing [music video] views." It was also described as an "attractive song that anyone who listens to hip-hop or watches Show Me the Money would know."

Awards and nominations for "VVS"
Year	Organization	Award	Result	Ref.
2021	Korean Hip-Hop Awards	Hip-hop Track of the Year	Won	
2021	Korean Hip-Hop Awards	Collaboration of the Year	Nominated	
2021	Melon Music Awards	Song of the Year	Nominated	

== Charts ==
=== Weekly charts ===
Chart (2020)	Peak position
South Korea (Gaon Digital Chart)	1
South Korea (Gaon Digital Chart) "VVS (H1ghr Remix)"	108

=== Year-end charts ===
Chart (2021)	Peak position
South Korea (Gaon Digital Chart)	23

== Certifications ==
Certifications for "VVS"
Region	Certification	Certified units/sales
Streaming
South Korea (KMCA)	Platinum	100,000,000^{†}
^{†} Streaming-only figures based on certification alone.
