= Show Me the Money 9 =

Ninth season of South Korean rap competition TV show

- Season 9
- Hosted by: Kim Jin-pyo; Holiship (Resident DJ)
- Judges: Team GroovyRoom x Justhis; GroovyRoom; Justhis; Team Code Kunst x Paloalto; Paloalto; Code Kunst; Team Dynamic Duo x Bewhy: Choiza; Gaeko; Bewhy; Team Zion.T x Giriboy; Zion.T; Giriboy
- Winner: Lil Boi
- Runners-up: Mushvenom (1st runner-up); Layone (2nd runner-up); Swings (3rd runner-up)

Release
- Original network: Mnet
- Original release: October 16 – December 18, 2020

Season chronology
- ← Previous; Show Me the Money 8 Next → Show Me the Money 10

The ninth season of the series Show Me the Money (known as Show Me the Money 9 or SMTM9) premiered on October 16, 2020, and ended on December 18, 2020. It was broadcast every Friday at 23:00 (KST) on Mnet. The season returned to four producing teams, after having featured only two in the previous season. Dynamic Duo & Bewhy, Paloalto & Code Kunst, Zion.T & Giriboy, and Justhis & GroovyRoom formed the producing teams for the season.

The season saw approximately 23,000 applicants, the most in the show's history. However, fewer contestants were able to move on from the Rapper Selection Round compared to previous seasons, due to safety restrictions related to the COVID-19 pandemic.

The winner of the season was Lil Boi, with Team Zion.T x Giriboy as the winning producer team. He won ₩100,000,000 in cash, a sports car, and a one-year project label for his music activities, totaling to ₩500,000,000. Producer Giriboy also became the first 3-time winning producer of the show, having previously won in seasons 777 and 8.

== Judges ==
Team GroovyRoom x Justhis (also known as Team Guljeot)

- GroovyRoom: Producer duo composed of Park Gyu-jung and Lee Hwi-min, currently signed under H1ghr Music, who previously participated as mentors/producers for seasons 2 and 3 of High School Rapper.
- Justhis: rapper under Indigo Music.

Team Code Kunst x Paloalto (also known as Team CoPal)

- Paloalto: Founder, rapper and former CEO of Hi-Lite Records, who in season 4 was a judge/producer for Team ZiPal and in season 777 for Team CodePalo.
- Code Kunst: Music producer signed under AOMG, formerly signed under the defunct HIGHGRND, who in season 777 was a judge/producer for Team CodePalo.

Team Dynamic Duo x Bewhy (also known as Team DyWhy)

- Choiza and Gaeko: Co-founders of Amoeba Culture who comprise the hip-hop group Dynamic Duo, and were judges/producers in season 6.
- Bewhy: Rapper and producer, currently signed under his own label Dejavu Group, who participated in season 4 and became the show's champion in season 5 as a member of Team AOMG. He was a winning judge/producer in season 8, with the BGM-v Crew.

Team Zion.T x Giriboy (also known as Team Jagi)

- Zion.T: Singer and producer under The Black Label and member of VV:D crew, who was a judge/producer in season 5 with Team YG.
- Giriboy: Rapper, songwriter and record producer signed under Just Music and WEDAPLUGG Records. He was a season 3 contestant under Team YDG, and a winning judge/producer in seasons 777 and 8 for Team Just Music and BGM-v crew respectively.

== Teams ==
After the 60 Seconds Team Trials, contestants who passed chose a producer team to join. There were ten members per producer team. Producer teams then selected contestants, if their team did not have ten members by the end of the 60 Second Team Trials:

Team GroovyRoom x Justhis:

- Mushvenom: Independent rapper, also known as TRICKER, who took part in seasons 2 and 6, and 8, and released TFT Mobile's commercial jingle "Dududunga".
- Khundi Panda: Signed under Dejavu Group.
- Mirani: Rookie rapper and member of VAT crew with fellow Team Member Munchman. She was initially eliminated during the 60 Seconds Team Trials, but was later revived and joined the team. Later signed with GroovyRoom's newly founded label AREA.
- Munchman: Member of rap and dance group MostBadassAsian (MBA crew) under Stoneship and VAT crew with fellow Team Member Mirani. Previously participated in season 8, in which he gained popularity after his elimination in that season's rapper evaluation round for performing his soon-to-be hit song "DDK".
- Kidd King: Member of Clarity Crew who previously participated in season 777, and in season 5 under his real name Baek Min-hyuk.
- Owen: See §Controversies.
- D.Ark: Season 777 contestant, as member of Team Illionaire Ambition. After his elimination from the show, he eventually signed under Psy's P Nation record label.
- Yenjamin: Signed under Brand New Music and leader of KIFF Clan. Previously participated in the second season of High School Rapper under his real name Kim Yoon-ho.
- Blase: Previously participated in season 8 as a preliminary member of BGM-v crew. Formerly known as Bla$e Kid.
- Kim Gyu-ha: Also known by his rapper name Reidaneon. He later participated in the fourth season of High School Rapper.

Team Code Kunst x Paloalto:

- Swings: Rapper and former CEO of Just Music, Indigo Music and WEDAPLUGG Records, who participated as a contestant in season 2 under Team D.O., in season 3 as a producer/judge, as the winning judge/producer for season 777, and in season 8 as a judge/producer. His participation this season was full of controversy due to his reputation as a well-respected rapper, his way of judging contestants dating back from season 777 and 8, and netizens believing that he won't pass the rapper evaluation round.
- Layone: Signed under OUTLIVE records. Previously participated in season 6 and 8. He initially received an all fail in the 60 Seconds Team Trials, but was later revived and joined the team.
- Mckdaddy: Member of VAGABONDS Tribe, signed under Grandline Entertainment, who was in seasons 777 and 8.
- Khakii: Rookie rapper signed under WAVY Seoul.
- Killagramz: Rapper and current radio show host in TBS and Arirang Radio, currently signed with K-Tune Collective, who was in seasons 5 and 6.
- Juvie Train: Member of The Movement and Buga Kingz crews, as well as project team Original Taste (OT).
- Ahn Byung-woong: Rapper signed under WAVY Seoul. Previously participated season 8 as a member of BGM-v crew in which was given the nickname "Lil Lil Boi".
- Jambino: Member of COZY CAVE crew.
- 365lit: Member of UnderSeongsuBridge (USB) crew, brother of fellow contestant and USB crew member Jupiter.
- Viceversa: Independent rapper who participated in seasons 777 and 8. He was initially eliminated during the 60 Seconds Team Trials, but was later revived and joined the team.

Team Dynamic Duo x Bewhy:

- Untell: Participant in season 8 as a preliminary member of BGM-v Crew. He initially eliminated during the 60 Seconds Team Trials, but was later revived and joined the team. Also participated in the third season of High School Rapper under his real name Oh Dong-hwan.
- Kaogaii: One-half of rap duo HOFGANG, signed under LBNC (formerly known as Lay Back Records).
- Heo Sung-hyun: Member of XALION crew with team member Kim Mono, who was in season 8, also known by his stage name ROSE DE PENNY.
- dsel: Member of FROST-30 crew, signed under LBNC.
- Chamane: Member of FRIEMILLI (FRML) crew who was in season 3.
- Kim Mono: Member of Innovor (IV) and XALION crews.
- Rohann: Member and leader of KIFF Clan, signed under Vismajor Company (VMC), who was in season 2 of High School Rapper (under the name Bae Yeon-seo, and later Lee Ro-han).
- Benzamin: Rapper signed under Primary's recently established record label PAKTORY COMPANY.
- Greengrim: Rapper signed under INTERPARK records. He initially eliminated during the 60 Seconds Team Trials, but was later revived and joined the team.

Team Zion.T. x Giriboy:

- Lil Boi: Rapper under his own label Halftime Records, one half of the rap duo Geeks, and member of the Buckwilds crew, who was in season 4.
- Wonstein: Rapper and singer signed under Mommy Son's label Beautiful Noise, who was in seasons 4, 777 and 8.
- Skyminhyuk: Member of My My Life crew, also known as SKY. Signed with Grandline Entertainment mid-season.
- Chillin Homie: Member of Naughty4Life (NFL) crew, signed under Mine Field, who was in season 777 and 8.
- Cho Soon-young: Member of HASHTAG crew who won MNET's hip-hop talent search My Major is HipHop, who is also known by his rapper name SYCHO.
- Lee Gi-wook: Member of 100 mwg crew, also by his rapper names xscapeway, or XS, and currently Streetbaby.
- Kitsyojii: One-half of rap duo HOFGANG, signed under LBNC.
- Mac Kidd: Signed under BASECREAM.
- Noahjooda: Independent rapper.
- Park Shin-wook: Previous participant in My Major is HipHop, also known by his rapper name HydroC.

== Rounds ==
=== Round one: Rapper Selection Round ===
After sending in their audition clips, those selected by the production crew attended the Rapper Selection Round; as a safety precaution from the COVID-19 pandemic, the contestants were divided into groups of thirty with one producer, (with the exception of Dynamic Duo and GroovyRoom), assigned to judge them individually. Each contestant performed a short a cappella rap in front of the producer and other contestants. The producer(s) then provided an in-depth evaluation of the contestant, and determined if they advanced to the next round. Unlike previous seasons, where the producer typically handed the SMTM neck chain to the contestant, contestants who received a pass simply took a neck chain hanging on a nearby rack. About 122 contestants would advance to the next round.

Notable Rappers from the Rapper Selection Round

Producer Judge	Passed Selection Round	Failed Selection Round
GroovyRoom	A-Chess, Chamane, Ourealgoat, Owen, (Note: Contestant Owen originally advanced to the next round. However, he dropped out of the show after being involved in a marijuana usage scandal with four other MKITRAIN members. Due to this, the show's producers decided to edit him out effective from the 60-second Team Trials until his official departure from the show after the Triple Crew Battle Round. (See Controversies Section)) Rohann, Syler, Son Simba, Choi Eui-seon, $ATSUKI, Juvie Train, Kim Geun-soo, Mirani, dsel, PLAN.Z.	YUJA, Kim Hyo-dong, Damye, Park Seong-jun, BlueWhale, Lee Jin-woo, Kim Nongmill
Justhis	Khundi Panda, Changbin, Lil Boi, kaogaii, sinchulbi, Takuwa, Yenjamin, Kerrigan May, Veiniyfl, Munchman, kitsyojii, Jeremy Quest, Park Min-gyu (1ndow), Go Jun-seo, Seo Yang-myeong, Lee Gi-wook	Kim Yeong-woo, Cocomong Mascot, Park Jun-soo, Rayshin, Lee Jeong-ho, Art Culture, Cha Yoo-jin, Shin Seong-bin, tendo, Shin Ji-hang, Sparky, Bakkiri
Code Kunst	365LIT, JUPITER, JJK, Boy Wonder, Jiho Givenchy, Killagramz, Khakii	Lee Luli, Mukuro, Hahoe
Paloalto	Chillin Homie, Leebido, Jeon Hyeon-jae, Cox Billy, YANU, M1NU, EPTEND, Jung Hye-in, Park Shin-wook, Swings, Cho Soon-young, Khan, SINCE, Cold Bay	OVDL, C.I.V.A Man. Mac9
Dynamic Duo	Ahn Byung-woong, Mckdaddy, Mac Kidd, Tarae, Heo Sung-hyun, You Da-yeon, UZ, Wooseok, VEKOEL	Bibii The Black Cat, Jang Yeong-jae, Jin Rak-heon, Lee Chang-bin, Lee Young-jin, Choi Sung-hoon, Chihoon, Puff Daehee, Bbaek Ga, Cuven Hardi
Bewhy	D.Ark, Kim Mono, Bruno Champman, Be'O	Kim San-ha, Achillo
Zion.T	noahjooda, Mushvenom, Wonstein, Moolso, snzae	Pearl Kid, Crucial Star, Trilla Gang, Han Seung-min, Go Da-hyeon, Cheongju Mascot, 18K, Jang Sang-ok (Layboy)
Giriboy	Skyminhyuk, viceversa, Jo Nam-hyuk, Johny, Untell, toigo, Naughty Mae	Beopard, Malkey, Hong Seung-ho, woohanryang, Hotchkiss, MidasX, Seo Min-gyu, Lobanabeat! (Note: Although officially eliminated from the show, the show's producers decided to edit out contestant Lobonabeat! following his now deleted Instagram post regarding the legalisation of marijuana and criticism of famous Korean rappers for not getting caught by the law for using marijuana. (See Controversy section))
Other Notable Rappers that Passed the Rapper Selection Round	Layone, MODO, Kim Gyu-ha, GFU, Choi Geun-ryeong, Greengrim, Park Ji-hyeon, Yuppy, Kim Dae-gyeong, Sikboy, Kim Tae-bin, Dilla, Shin Jin, Jambino	

=== Round two: Producer Performances and 60 Second Team Trials ===
The second round began with the Producer Performances, in which the producers performed in front of the contestants to convince the contestants to join their team. The performances were later used to pick which producer team they would face during the Team Diss Round, based on the contestants' votes.

Previously known as the One Minute Rap Round, the 60 Second Team Trials allowed each contestant one minute to rap in front of all judges. At least one team of judges were required to pass the contestant in order to proceed with the team selection process. However, the producer team(s) could subsequently give a "FAIL" to the contestant after the performance if they thought that the contestant was not qualified to join their team. In this case, the contestant would then choose a different producer team that they wanted to join. If the contestant received an "ALL FAIL" from either the first or second judging, they were eliminated from the show. Only 40 out of the 122 remaining contestants would advance to the next round, with 10 contestants on each producer team. A "revival round" for 8 eliminated contestants was held for those producer teams that did not have a full 10-member team.

Producer Performances

Producer Team	Songs Performed
Team GroovyRoom x Justhis	G+Jus Freestyle (Prod. by GroovyRoom)
Team Code Kunst x Paloalto	Save, Good Day (both songs Prod. by Code Kunst)
Team Zion.T x Giriboy	My Seat
Team Dynamic Duo x Bewhy	Gottasadae, SUPERBEEwhY, CHALLAN, Holy Ghost is Coming Down, Kneel; Don't Block My Way, Career High, Day Day, Fireworks

- Indicates new song performed for the first time in the show, which was to be part of the season's discography.

Notable rappers at the 60 Second Team Trials

Rapper	Team GroovyRoom x Justhis	Team Code Kunst x Paloalto	Team Dynamic Duo x Bewhy	Team Zion.T x Giriboy	Team Selected to Join
Killagramz	PASS	PASS	PASS/FAIL	PASS/FAIL	Team Code Kunst x Paloalto
D.Ark	PASS	FAIL	FAIL	FAIL	Team GroovyRoom x Justhis
Jiho Givenchy	FAIL	FAIL	FAIL	FAIL	Eliminated
Skyminhyuk	FAIL	FAIL	FAIL	PASS	Team Zion T. x Giriboy
Takuwa	FAIL	FAIL	FAIL	FAIL	Eliminated; Selected for the Revival Round
Kim Mono	PASS	PASS	PASS	PASS	Team Dynamic Duo x Bewhy
viceversa	FAIL	FAIL	FAIL	FAIL	Eliminated; Selected for the Revival Round
Toigo	FAIL	PASS/FAIL	FAIL	FAIL	Eliminated; Selected for the Revival Round
Wonstein	PASS	PASS	PASS	PASS	Team Zion.T x Giriboy
Kidd King	PASS	PASS	PASS	PASS/FAIL	Team GroovyRoom x Justhis
Juvie Train	PASS/FAIL	PASS	PASS/FAIL	PASS/FAIL	Team Code Kunst x Paloalto
Swings	FAIL (Note: Swings is the only contestant this season that the hidden rule did apply on. Also known as the Swings' judging rule, it is a hidden rule introduced by him in season 777 where a rapper currently signed under the company of one of its producer team's judges will receive a fail by that producer team at the start of his/her rap to avoid favoritism in judging. Producer Justhis is signed under Swings' label Indigo Music, and therefore had to fall him at the beginning of the round.)	PASS	PASS	FAIL (Note: Swings is the only contestant this season that the hidden rule did not apply on. Also known as the Swings' judging rule, it is a hidden rule introduced by him in season 777 where a rapper currently signed under the company of one of its producer team's judges will receive a fail by that producer team at the start of his/her rap to avoid favoritism in judging. Producer Giriboy is signed under Just Music and WeDaPlugg Records, and therefore had to fall him at the beginning of the round.)	Team Code Kunst x Paloalto
Johny	FAIL	FAIL	FAIL	FAIL	Eliminated
Seo Yang-myeong	FAIL	FAIL	FAIL	FAIL	Eliminated
Lil Boi	PASS	PASS	PASS	PASS	Team Zion.T x Giriboy
Khakii	PASS	PASS	PASS	PASS	Team Code Kunst x Paloalto
Yenjamin	PASS	PASS/FAIL	PASS	PASS	Team GroovyRoom x Justhis
KHAN	FAIL	PASS/FAIL	FAIL	FAIL	Eliminated
Cho Soon-young	FAIL	PASS/FAIL	PASS/FAIL	PASS	Team Zion.T x Giriboy
Park Shin-wook	PASS	PASS/FAIL	PASS	PASS	Team Zion.T x Giriboy
Mirani	FAIL	FAIL	FAIL	PASS/FAIL	Eliminated; Selected for the Revival Round
Kaogaii	PASS/FAIL	PASS/FAIL	PASS	PASS/FAIL	Team Dynamic Duo x Bewhy
kitsyojii	PASS/FAIL	PASS	PASS	PASS	Team Zion.T x Giriboy
Khundi Panda	PASS	PASS/FAIL	PASS/FAIL	PASS/FAIL	Team GroovyRoom x Justhis
Munchman	PASS	PASS	PASS/FAIL	PASS	Team GroovyRoom x Justhis
Changbin	FAIL	FAIL	FAIL	FAIL	Eliminated
Wooseok	FAIL	FAIL	PASS/FAIL	FAIL	Eliminated
Layone	PASS/FAIL	PASS/FAIL	PASS/FAIL	FAIL	Eliminated; Selected for the Revival Round
Cox Billy	FAIL	FAIL	FAIL	FAIL	Eliminated
Since	FAIL	FAIL	FAIL	FAIL	Eliminated
Yoo Da-yeon	FAIL	FAIL	FAIL	FAIL	Eliminated
Kerrigan May	PASS/FAIL	FAIL	FAIL	FAIL	Eliminated
Untell	PASS/FAIL	PASS/FAIL	PASS/FAIL	FAIL	Eliminated; Selected for the Revival Round
Ahn Byung-woong	FAIL	PASS	PASS	PASS/FAIL	Team Code Kunst x Paloalto
dsel	FAIL	FAIL	PASS	PASS	Team Dynamic Duo x Bewhy
Bruno Champman	PASS/FAIL	FAIL	PASS	PASS/FAIL	Team Dynamic Duo x Bewhy
Mushvenom	PASS	PASS/FAIL	PASS	PASS	Team GroovyRoom x Justhis
365lit	FAIL	PASS	FAIL	FAIL	Team Code Kunst x Paloalto
Jeon Jin-woo (woojay)	FAIL	PASS/FAIL	FAIL	FAIL	Eliminated
Park Joon-ho	FAIL	PASS/FAIL	FAIL	FAIL	Eliminated
Yoo Woo-hyun	FAIL	PASS/FAIL	FAIL	FAIL	Eliminated
Chillin Homie	PASS	PASS	FAIL	PASS	Team Zion.T x Giriboy
Mckdaddy	PASS	PASS	PASS	PASS	Team Code Kunst x Paloalto
Chamane	PASS	FAIL	PASS	FAIL	Team Dynamic Duo x Bewhy
Rohann	PASS	FAIL	PASS	FAIL	Team Dynamic Duo x Bewhy
Heo Sung-hyun	FAIL	FAIL	PASS	FAIL	Team Dynamic Duo x Bewhy
Kim Gyu-ha	PASS	PASS	FAIL	FAIL	Team GroovyRoom x Justhis
Blase	PASS	PASS	PASS	FAIL	Team GroovyRoom x Justhis
Owen	PASS	FAIL	PASS	PASS	Team GroovyRoom x Justhis
Ourrealgoat	FAIL	FAIL	FAIL	FAIL	Eliminated; Selected for the Revival Round
Mac Kidd	PASS	PASS	PASS	PASS	Team Zion.T x Giriboy
noahjooda	PASS	FAIL	FAIL	PASS	Team Zion.T x Giriboy
Benzamin	FAIL	PASS	PASS	PASS	Team Dynamic Duo x Bewhy
Lee Gi-wook	PASS	FAIL	FAIL	PASS	Team Zion.T x Giriboy
Jambino	PASS	PASS	PASS	FAIL	Team Code Kunst x Paloalto
Greengrim	FAIL	FAIL	FAIL	FAIL	Eliminated; Selected for the Revival Round

Selected rappers in the Revival Round

Contestant	60 Seconds Team Trials	Revival Round	Team Selected
Mirani	FAIL	PASS	Team GroovyRoom x Justhis
viceversa	FAIL	PASS	Team Code Kunst x Paloalto
Untell	FAIL	PASS	Team Dynamic Duo x Bewhy
Layone	FAIL	PASS	Team Code Kunst x Paloalto
Greengrim	FAIL	PASS	Team Dynamic Duo x Bewhy
Takuwa	FAIL	FAIL	Eliminated
Ourrealgoat	FAIL	FAIL	Eliminated
Toigo	FAIL	FAIL	Eliminated

Received a "PASS" or "ALL PASS" from the producer team(s)
Received a "FAIL" from producer team(s). If the contestant received an "ALL FAIL", they were eliminated from the show
Initially received a "PASS" from the producer team(s) but was given a "FAIL" after the producer team(s) decided not to pick the contestant for their team. If all producer teams decided to give a "PASS/FALL", the contestant was eliminated from the show

=== Round three (first part): Leader Selection Cypher ===
Before this round, the 40 remaining contestants each had a sticker pasted on them, based on the number passes each had obtained during the performance portion of the 60 Seconds Team Trials. Contestants with an "all pass" had a "Top" sticker, those with 2 or 3 passes had a "Middle" sticker, those with 1 pass had a "Bottom" sticker, and those that were revived from the Revival Round had a "Brink of Elimination" sticker.

All members of each producer team participated in a rap cypher, in which contestants performed freestyle raps based on the beat they wanted to do it with. At the end of this round, each producer team chose one contestant to be eliminated from the show, and selected their three best performers to serve as group leaders for the next round.

Producer Team	Beat	Contestant(s)	Chosen as Group Leaders for the next round	Bottom Three Contestants	Eliminated Contestant
Team GroovyRoom x Justhis	YBN Almighty Jay & YBN Nahmir - New Drip	Owen, Munchman	Mushvenom; Blase; Khundi Panda	Kim Gyu-ha; D.Ark; Kidd King	Kim Gyu-ha
Team GroovyRoom x Justhis	Dababy - Rockstar	Mushvenom, Yenjamin	Mushvenom; Blase; Khundi Panda	Kim Gyu-ha; D.Ark; Kidd King	Kim Gyu-ha
Team GroovyRoom x Justhis	Logic - Homicide	D.Ark, Blase	Mushvenom; Blase; Khundi Panda	Kim Gyu-ha; D.Ark; Kidd King	Kim Gyu-ha
Team GroovyRoom x Justhis	Megan Thee Stallion (ft. Tyga) - Freak	Kidd King, Khundi Panda	Mushvenom; Blase; Khundi Panda	Kim Gyu-ha; D.Ark; Kidd King	Kim Gyu-ha
Team GroovyRoom x Justhis	DJ Khaled - I Got The Keys	Kim Gyu-ha, Mirani	Mushvenom; Blase; Khundi Panda	Kim Gyu-ha; D.Ark; Kidd King	Kim Gyu-ha
Team Zion.T x Giriboy	Justin Bieber - Yummy	Skyminhyuk, Lil Boi	Cho Soon-young; Lee Gi-wook; Wonstein	noahjooda Park Shin-wook; Mac Kidd	Park Shin-wook
Team Zion.T x Giriboy	Kanye West (ft. Lil Pump) - I Love It	noahjooda, Chillin Homie	Cho Soon-young; Lee Gi-wook; Wonstein	noahjooda Park Shin-wook; Mac Kidd	Park Shin-wook
Team Zion.T x Giriboy	Logic - Homicide	kitsyojii, Park Shin-wook	Cho Soon-young; Lee Gi-wook; Wonstein	noahjooda Park Shin-wook; Mac Kidd	Park Shin-wook
Team Zion.T x Giriboy	Famous Dex - Nervous	Mac Kidd, Cho Soon-young	Cho Soon-young; Lee Gi-wook; Wonstein	noahjooda Park Shin-wook; Mac Kidd	Park Shin-wook
Team Zion.T x Giriboy	YBN Almighty Jay & YBN Nahmir - New Drip	Lee Gi-wook, Wonstein	Cho Soon-young; Lee Gi-wook; Wonstein	noahjooda Park Shin-wook; Mac Kidd	Park Shin-wook
Team Dynamic Duo x Bewhy	Ian Ka$h - Untitled	Kim Mono, dsel	Kim Mono; Chamane dsel	Greengrim; Benzamin; Kaogaii	Greengrim
Team Dynamic Duo x Bewhy	Young Thug - The London	Benzamin, Chamane	Kim Mono; Chamane dsel	Greengrim; Benzamin; Kaogaii	Greengrim
Team Dynamic Duo x Bewhy	YBN Almighty Jay & YBN Nahmir - New Drip	Heo Sung-hyun, Rohann	Kim Mono; Chamane dsel	Greengrim; Benzamin; Kaogaii	Greengrim
Team Dynamic Duo x Bewhy	Offset - Clout	Greengrim, Untell	Kim Mono; Chamane dsel	Greengrim; Benzamin; Kaogaii	Greengrim
Team Dynamic Duo x Bewhy	Logic - Homicide	Bruno Champman	Kim Mono; Chamane dsel	Greengrim; Benzamin; Kaogaii	Greengrim
Team Dynamic Duo x Bewhy	Future - Mask Off	Kaogaii	Kim Mono; Chamane dsel	Greengrim; Benzamin; Kaogaii	Greengrim
Team Code Kunst x Paloalto	A$AP Rocky - RAF	Swings	Swings; Mckdaddy; Juvie Train (Note: Contestant Juvie Train was initially selected by Team GroovyRoom x Justhis as one of the Bottom Three contestants, but was then chosen as one of the Crew Leaders after avoiding elimination.)	Jambino viceversa Juvie Train	viceversa
Team Code Kunst x Paloalto	Offset - Clout	365lit, Jambino	Swings; Mckdaddy; Juvie Train	Jambino viceversa Juvie Train	viceversa
Team Code Kunst x Paloalto	French Montana (ft. Blueface, & Lil Tjay) - Slide	Layone, Juvie Train	Swings; Mckdaddy; Juvie Train	Jambino viceversa Juvie Train	viceversa
Team Code Kunst x Paloalto	Megan Thee Stallion (ft. Tyga) - Freak	Mckdaddy, Khakii	Swings; Mckdaddy; Juvie Train	Jambino viceversa Juvie Train	viceversa
Team Code Kunst x Paloalto	Future - Mask Off	viceversa, Killagramz	Swings; Mckdaddy; Juvie Train	Jambino viceversa Juvie Train	viceversa
Team Code Kunst x Paloalto	Juice Wrld (ft. NBA Youngboy) - Bandit	Ahn Byung-woong	Swings; Mckdaddy; Juvie Train	Jambino viceversa Juvie Train	viceversa

=== Round three (second part): Triple Crew Battle ===
The three crew leaders from each producer team each recruited two team members to form crews and compete in a Triple Crew battle. Each crew chose a beat or song from the producer team that they performed in front of the producer teams. The producers then ranked the groups based on their performances. The crew with the best performance had all three contestants advance to the next round, while the second-placed crew had one contestant eliminated, and the third-placed crew had two contestants eliminated.

Producer Team	Rank	Beat	Crew Leader + Contestants	Eliminated Contestant(s)
Team Zion.T x Giriboy	3	Slom Beat 3 (Prod. by Slom)	Lee Gi-wook; Mac Kidd kitsyojii	Mac Kidd kitsyojii
Team Zion.T x Giriboy	2	Slom Beat 2 (Prod. by Slom)	Cho Soon-young; Skyminhyuk noahjooda	noahjooda
Team Zion.T x Giriboy	1	Slom Beat 3 (Prod. by Slom)	Wonstein; Lil Boi; Chillin Homie	N/A
Team Dynamic Duo x Bewhy	3	Bewhy - WON	Kim Mono; Heo Sung-hyun; Benzamin	Benzamin; Kim Mono
Team Dynamic Duo x Bewhy	1	Dynamic Duo (ft. Penomeco) - Sweet and Spicy (MSG)	Chamane; Kaogaii; Bruno Champman	N/A
Team Dynamic Duo x Bewhy	2	Dynamic Duo (ft. Supreme Team) - Home Run (Lee Dae-ho)	dsel Untell; Rohann	Rohann
Team GroovyRoom x Justhis	1	Justhis (ft. Kid Milli, NO:EL and Young B) - IndiGO	Mushvenom; Mirani; Owen	Owen
Team GroovyRoom x Justhis	2	Justhis (ft. Kid Milli, NO:EL and Young B) - IndiGO	Blase; Kidd King; Munchman	Blase
Team GroovyRoom x Justhis	3	Justhis (ft. Paloalto) - Seoul Romance (Prod. by GroovyRoom)	Khundi Panda; Yenjamin; D.Ark	D.Ark; Yenjamin
Team Code Kunst x Paloalto	1	Paloalto (ft. Superbee, Sway D and Zene The Zilla) - Shelter	Swings; Khakii; Layone	N/A
Team Code Kunst x Paloalto	3	Code Kunst (ft. Paloalto and The Quiett) - People	Mckdaddy; 365lit Ahn Byung-woong	Ahn Byung-woong; 365lit
Team Code Kunst x Paloalto	2	Code Kunst (ft. Paloalto and The Quiett) - People	Juvie Train; Jambino; Killagramz	Jambino

Indicates first-placed crew with all members advancing to the next round
Indicates second-placed crew with only two members advancing to the next round
Indicates third-placed crew with only one member advancing to the next round
Indicates the eliminated contestant(s)

=== Round four: Soundtrack Battle ===
This round was previously known as the Crew Song Mission. Members of each producer team split into two crews – with the first placed crew from the previous round performing together – while the remaining members of the second and third placed crews formed a new group and performed together. The producer teams then picked new crew leaders based on their performances in the last round. Prior to this round, the producer teams held team meetings in which the producers introduced the beat they would use this round and would be performed in front of the Producer Teams. At the end of each group performance, each producer team eliminated two contestants from the losing crew of each producer team, while the members of the first placed crew advanced to the next round. The remaining crew members had their songs officially released as part of the season's official discography.

Producer Team	Crew	Crew Leader + Members	Song	Eliminated Contestant(s)
Team Code Kunst x Paloalto	Killagramz Crew	Killagramz; Juvie Train; Mckdaddy	Want It (원해) (ft. Paloalto) (Prod. Code Kunst & Paloalto)	Juvie Train; Killagramz
Team Code Kunst x Paloalto	Khakii Crew	Khakii; Swings; Layone	Want It (원해) (ft. Paloalto) (Prod. Code Kunst & Paloalto)	N/A
Team Dynamic Duo x Bewhy	Chamane Crew	Chamane; Kaogaii; Bruno Champman	Win Win (윈윈) (ft. Gaeko & Bewhy) (Prod. Bewhy)	Bruno Champman; Chamane
Team Dynamic Duo x Bewhy	dsel Crew	dsel Untell; Heo Sung-hyun	Win Win (윈윈) (ft. Gaeko & Bewhy) (Prod. Bewhy)	N/A
Team GroovyRoom x Justhis	Khundi Panda Crew	Khundi Panda; Kidd King; Munchman	VVS (ft. Justhis) (Prod. GroovyRoom) (Note: Rapper and season 4 contestant Sik-K was also credited for his contributions in the composition and lyrics of this song.)	Kidd King (Note: As a result from Owen's departure before this round, Team GroovyRoom x Justhis will only eliminate one contestant from the losing team, while the remaining two members advance to the next round and will be included in this season's official discography)
Team GroovyRoom x Justhis	Mushvenom Crew	Mushvenom; Mirani	VVS (ft. Justhis) (Prod. GroovyRoom)	N/A
Team Zion.T x Giriboy	Cho Soon-young Crew	Cho Soon-young; Lee Gi-wook; Skyminhyuk	Kick It (ft. Giriboy) (Prod. SLOM) (Note: Both Cho Soon-young Crew's "Kick It" and Wonstein Crew's "Freak" use the same instrumental produced by SLOM. With Wonstein Crew winning the soundtrack battle, they get to keep "Freak" as their song title, with their crew members and lone Cho Soon-young Crew member Skyminhyuk's lyrics included in the song.)	Cho Soon-young; Lee Gi-wook
Team Zion.T x Giriboy	Wonstein Crew	Wonstein; Lil Boi; Chillin Homie	Freak (Prod. SLOM)	N/A

Indicates the winning team, with all group members advancing to the next round, and their song included in the season's official discography
Indicates the losing team, with only one member of their team advancing to the next round and joining the winning crew in the season's official discography.
Indicates the eliminated contestant(s)

=== Round five: Team Diss Battle ===
The winning producer team from the Producer Performances stages (Dynamic Duo x Bewhy) could choose their opposing team for this round. Due to the COVID-19 pandemic, only the eliminated contestants from previous rounds were available to serve as the audience and voters for this round. Each member of the audience voted for only 1 producer team after each rap battle. The losing producer team had its producers choose 1 contestant to eliminate, while the winning producer team had all members advance to the next round.

Team Dynamic Duo x Bewhy vs. Team GroovyRoom x Justhis
Beat	Team Dynamic Duo x Bewhy	vs.	Beat	Team GroovyRoom x Justhis	Score
EK (ft. Munchman) - Go Straight	Heo Sung-hyun	vs.	Waka Flocka Flame - Hard in the Paint	Munchman	72-27
Khundi Panda Diss Song (Prod. dsel)	dsel	vs.	dsel, Really dsel? (Prod. Bewhy) (Note: The beat Khundi Panda used in this Team Diss match-up is the instrumental from Superbee's "SuperbeewhY" from season 777, which featured Bewhy)	Khundi Panda	27-72
Why Are You So Noisy (Prod. Margin Choi), (Note: Contestant Mushvenom originally had a song of the same title released in 2019.); Eminem - My Name Is	Kaogaii; Untell	vs.	Eminem - I'm Back, DaBaby - Rockstar	Mirani; Mushvenom	Unrevealed
Team Code Kunst x Paloalto vs. Team Zion T. x Giriboy
Beat	Team Code Kunst x Paloalto	vs.	Beat	Team Zion.T x Giriboy	Score
Wonstein(?) (Prod. Coco Tofu Dad)	Layone	vs.	Wonstein Diss Beat - (Prod. Ohiotish)	Wonstein	Unrevealed
Meek Mill (ft. Drake) - Going Bad	Mckdaddy	vs.	Aminé - Burden	Chillin Homie	Unrevealed
Geeks - Officially Missing You, (Note: Contestant Khakii imitated Lil Boi by wearing a suit similar from the Officially Missing You music video.); Jay Park - On It (Note: Contestant Lil Boi also had a version of this song in season 4 as part of Team AOMG.)	Khakii	vs.	Cookies (Prod. Hecop)	Lil Boi	Unrevealed
Big Sean (ft. Kendrick Lamar & Jay Electronica) - Control (Note: Contestant Swings used the instrumental of this song for his two diss tracks, namely "King Swings" and "Hwang Jung-min (King Swings Part 2)" as part of "The Control Diss Phenomenon" in August 2013. These two diss tracks were released against Ugly Duck, TakeOne, Deepflow (for the King Swings diss track), and Simon Dominic (for the Hwang Jung-min diss track) respectively. Within that same month, Team Dynamic Duo x Bewhy Producer and Amoeba Culture founder/artist Gaeko also used this beat to release his diss track "I Can Control You" against its former artist and Supreme Team member E-Sens. Hence, it was highlighted in the beginning of the Swings vs. Skyminhyuk match-up that Gaeko had flashbacks of The Control Diss Phenomenon during that year.)	Swings	vs.	Chance the Rapper - Sunday Candy, Swings - Bulldozer	Skyminhyuk (Note: In their Team Diss match-up, contestant Skyminhyuk wore a chef suit, similar to what Swings wore in his music video "Usain Bolt".)	61-39

Indicates the winning team, with all contestants advancing to the next round.
Indicates the winning contestant/s.
Eliminated from the show.

=== Round six: first live performances ===
Following the results of the Team Diss Battles, winning teams competed against each other and losing teams competed against each other at the live performances. Due to the COVID-19 pandemic, the show's producers held an open online application prior to this round, in which they selected a limited number of people, in addition to previously eliminated rappers, to serve as live audience members and voters for this round. All 4 producer teams held the mic selection for two of their own contestants to determine who would perform at the live stage; one contestant from each producer team would be eliminated. There were two rounds in the voting process. The first round involved voting on each of the two stages in one round; after the first round of voting was over, the second round of voting occurred, in which the live audience could only vote for one contestant. All of the contestants' performance money earnings were then accumulated to their respective producer teams at the end of the round. The winning producer team in each team matchup had its members advance to the semi-final round, while the losing producer team eliminated one more contestant.

1st Live Performances
Producer Team	Contestant + Song	vs.	Producer Team	Contestant + Song	Total Live Audience Votes (in ₩)	Eliminated Contestants
Code Kunst x Paloalto	Swings - Upgrade 2020 (ft. Paloalto) (Prod. Code Kunst)	vs.	Dynamic Duo x Bewhy	Untell - Peter Pan (피터팬) (Prod. Bewhy)	1,597,750 – 1,272,820	N/A
Code Kunst x Paloalto	Layone - Mask On (ft. Paloalto & Coogie) (Prod. Code Kunst)	vs.	Dynamic Duo x Bewhy	Kaogaii - Bakchigi (박치기) (ft. Dynamic Duo) (Prod. Nutty) (Note: The live performance includes a guitar solo from No Brain's guitarist VOVO.)	1,442,540 – 1,533,840	Heo Sung-hyun; Mckdaddy
GroovyRoom x Justhis	Mirani - Achoo (ft. pH-1 & Haon) (Prod. GroovyRoom) (Note: The live performance involves DJ play by DJ SMMT.)	vs.	Zion T. x Giriboy	Skyminhyuk - Flashing (번쩍) (ft. Han Yo-han & OLNL)	1,743,830 – 1,414,250	Munchman; Chillin Homie (Note: Contestant Chillin Homie was unable to participate in the Team Rehearsals one day before the 1st Live Performance round due to panic disorder. He elaborated through his Instagram account that he felt a lot of pressure to perform better as he is participating in the show for the third straight season. As a result, he felt more depressed, leading to frequent panic attacks throughout the season and memory loss which happened a day before the shooting of this round. He was informed that the memory loss makes him at risk of getting Alzheimer's disease in which he is worried about. After consulting with his GROOVL1N CEO Ravi and team producer Giriboy about his situation, he decided not to continue in this round, thus leading to his official elimination from the show.)
GroovyRoom x Justhis	Khundi Panda - The Roots (뿌리) (ft. Justhis) (Prod. GroovyRoom)	vs.	Zion T. x Giriboy	Lil Boi - Tomorrow (내일이 오면) (ft. Giriboy & BIG Naughty)	1,789,480 – 1,835,130	N/A
GroovyRoom x Justhis	Mushvenom - Tricker (부어라 비워라) (Note: Literal title is "Pour it Up") (Prod. GroovyRoom) (Note: The live performance features back-up singers featured Kim So-ri, Kwon Eun-jin & Yoon Jin-woo, and back-up dancers from HOLYBANG, Star System, and Alterego dance groups)	vs.	Zion T. x Giriboy	Wonstein - Infrared Camera (적외선 카메라)	1,734,700 – 1,689,050	N/A

Indicates the winning performance, which advanced to the semi-final round.
Eliminated from the show through mic selection prior to this round.

Producer Team	Total Team Performance Money Earned (in ₩)	vs.	Producer Team	Total Team Performance Money Earned (in ₩)	Eliminated Contestant
Code Kunst x Paloalto	3,040,290	vs.	Dynamic Duo x Bewhy	2,812,040	Kaogaii
GroovyRoom x Justhis	5,268,010	vs.	Zion T. x Giriboy	4,665,430	Skyminhyuk

Indicates the winning producer team, all of whose contestants advanced to the semi-final round.
Indicates the losing producer team, which was required to eliminate one contestant at the end of the round.

=== Round Seven: semi-final performances ===
The top 8 contestants were paired up for the semi-final round. At the end of the first live performances, MC Kim Jin-pyo presented eight cards with each card representing one contestant. From there, he selected four cards that had bonuses in them, indicating that the contestant called in would have a chance to pick his/her opponent for this round. Due to the COVID-19 pandemic, like with the previous round, the show's producers held an open online application prior to this round in which they selected a limited number of people, in addition to previously eliminated rappers, to serve as live audience members and voters for this round. Each of the eight semi-finalists had a solo performance with a guest performer(s). Similar to the first Live Performances round, the same two-round voting process occurred in this round. The contestant who received more performance money after two rounds of voting against their match-up advanced to the finals, while the loser got eliminated. In the event that all contestant(s) in one team lost in their respective match-up(s), their entire producer team was eliminated from the show.

Semi-final Performances
Producer Team	Contestant + Song	vs.	Producer Team	Contestant + Song	Total Live Audience Votes (in ₩)
Dynamic Duo x Bewhy	Untell - Grain (결) (ft. Dynamic Duo & Bewhy)	vs.	GroovyRoom x Justhis	Mushvenom - Godok (고독하구만) (ft. Superbee) (Prod. GroovyRoom) (Note: The phrase "고독하구만" literally means "What a sad life." This phrase was initially used by Mushvenom and Mirani in reference to the unfortunate circumstances they had to face during the Triple Crew Battle and Soundtrack Mission Rounds. However, the song title's meaning and lyrical content changes with the word "고" (pronounced as "go/ko" in Hangul) means "Go" and the word "독" (pronounced as "dok" in Hangul) means toxic or venom (just in his rapper name Mushvenom), and it can also mean "determined" in Korean. The description of the song is "being determined in order to go forward". Hence, the song is titled "Godok") (Note: The live performance features masked appearances from Mushvenom's friends "Pretty Girl" and "Simpson")	2,784,420 – 3,847,290
Code Kunst x Paloalto	Layone - iii (ft. Basick & Kid Milli) (Prod. Code Kunst)	vs.	Zion T x Giriboy	Wonstein - No Bad Dogs (세상에 나쁜 개는 없다) (ft. Yang Dong-geun & Zion.T) (Prod. SLOM)	3,233,520 – 3,068,850
GroovyRoom x Justhis	Mirani - Part Time (ft. Queen WA$ABII) (Prod. GroovyRoom, BOYCOLD)	vs.	Zion T x Giriboy	Lil Boi - Bad News Cypher vol. 2 (ft. TakeOne) (Note: This is the fourth release of the Bad News Cypher Edition. Prior to this, Rapper and season 2 contestant TakeOne released the original "Bad News Cypher" in 2012. In 2018, he released the second installment of song titled "Bad News Cypher 1/2" featuring contestant Lil Boi as part of the MICSWAGGER BPM series. In 2019, a remix version of the Bad News Cypher titled "Bad News Cypher vol. 1 (vv2 remix) was released and it featured Lil Boi, TakeOne, Don Malik, and GroovyRoom x Justhis producer Justhis.)	1,946,100 – 4,131,720
Code Kunst x Paloalto	Swings - Villain (악역) (ft. Lee Hi & Simon Dominic (Note: With this collaboration, the long-standing beef between Swings and Simon Dominic dating back in 2013 has officially ended.)) (Prod. Code Kunst)	vs.	GroovyRoom x Justhis	Khundi Panda - Hero (ft. Justhis & Golden) (Prod. GroovyRoom)	3,502,980 – 3,158,670

Indicates the winning performance and will advance to the final round.
Eliminated from the show. If all contestant(s) in one team lost their respective match-ups, their entire producer team is eliminated as well from the show.

=== Round eight: final performances and special performances (live episode) ===
Due to the COVID-19 pandemic, this season's final round had pre-recorded performances, with a live announcement of performance results and season winner based on voting results from both the pre-finals online evaluation team (60% of the votes) and live SMS voters (40% of the votes). Prior to the final episode, the show's producers established a pre-finals online evaluation team where they selected people to serve as virtual audience members and voters for this round. They had a chance to watch and vote for the pre-recorded performances three hours before the final episode was aired. The four finalists also met up the night prior to the final round to determine their order of performances. The final round was divided into two parts: the first part of the finals featured all four finalists each having a solo performance with a special guest performer(s). After all four finalists performed, a two-round voting process from both the pre-finals online evaluation team and live SMS voting was held, and the performance ranking based on the pre-online votes was announced. In the second part of the finals, the four finalists each had one last performance with the producer(s) and/or with a special guest performer(s), with the same two-round voting process and announcement of performance ranking held after the final performances. The contestant who earned the most cumulative performance money from both the pre-finals online evaluation team voters and live SMS voters in all two performances was the season's champion, receiving ₩100,000,000 in cash, a sports car, and the launch of a one-year project label for their music activities, totaling up to ₩500,000,000. The final episode also included special performances from eliminated contestants with their songs included in this season's official discography.

Finals Performances (Part 1)
Rank (From Pre-online Votes)	Producer Team	Contestant + Song
2	GroovyRoom x Justhis	Mushvenom - Let's See (보자 보자) (Note: Mushvenom's song Let's See was released earlier in 2020) + Go (가다) (ft. Simon Dominic & The Quiett) (Note: An earlier version of the song "Go" was first performed by Mushvenom during the fifth season of MIC SWAGGER in 2019 with the show's host and fellow season 9 contestant JJK.) (Both songs Prod. SLO)
4	Code Kunst x Paloalto	Swings - B Mine (ft. SUMIN) (Prod. Code Kunst)
3	Code Kunst x Paloalto	Layone - Daydreamin (ft. Sogumm & Woo Won-jae) (Prod. Yosi, Paloalto & Code Kunst)
1	Zion T. x Giriboy	Lil Boi - On Air (ft. Loco, Jay Park, & Gray) (Prod. Gray) (Note: This song also includes sample vocals from Team Dynamic Duo x Bewhy producer Bewhy when he screamed "Lil Boi" after passing the 60-Second Team Trials.)

Special Performances
Contestant(s)	Song
Ahn Byung-woong, Khakii, Mckdaddy, Munchman	New New (뉴뉴) (Prod. GroovyRoom & MISU)
Kidd King, Cho Soon-young, Chamane, Bruno Champman, Juvie Train, Killagramz	STARS (ON A!R PROJECT)
Rohann, Heo Sung-hyun, Lee Gi-wook, dsel, Khundi Panda	Y Earned (연말이 되면) (ft. Gaeko, SOLE) (Prod. Primary & plusONE)

Finals Performances (Part 2)
Rank (from Pre-online votes)	Producer Team	Contestant + Song
2	GroovyRoom x Justhis	Mushvenom - Dududunga (두둥 등장) (Note: Mushvenom's famous commercial jingle for TFT Mobile's League of Legends Game) + The Beauty of Void (여백의 미) (ft. Jessi & Justhis) (Prod. GroovyRoom)
4	Code Kunst x Paloalto	Swings - Still Hungry (ft. Paloalto & Mommy Son) (Prod. Code Kunst)
3	Code Kunst x Paloalto	Layone - Yay (ft. Paloalto, Lee Young-ji, & Jamie) (Prod. Code Kunst)
1	Zion T. x Giriboy	Lil Boi - Credit (ft. Yumdda, Giriboy, & Zion.T)

Combined Finals Results (Part 1 + 2 Performances)
Rank	Producer Team	Contestant	Total Live Audience Votes (in ₩) (Pre-online Votes + Live SMS Votes)
1	Zion T. x Giriboy	Lil Boi	21,984,200
2	GroovyRoom x Justhis	Mushvenom	10,476,580
3	Code Kunst x Paloalto	Layone	6,599,130
4	Code Kunst x Paloalto	Swings	6,246,380

Indicates winner
Indicates the 1st runner-up
Indicates the 2nd and 3rd runner-ups

== Top 24 ==
Contestant	Producer Team	Round 1	Round 2	Round 3 (Part 1)	Round 3 (Part 2)	Round 4	Round 5	Round 6	Semi-finals	Finals
Lil Boi	Zion T x Giriboy	PASS	ALL-PASS	PASS	1ST PLACE	WON	WON	WON/ LOST	WON	WINNER
Mushvenom	GroovyRoom x Justhis	PASS	ALL-PASS/ 1 PASS/FAIL	PASS	1ST PLACE	WON	WON	WON/ WON	WON	1ST RUNNER-UP
Layone	Code Kunst x Paloalto	PASS	1 FAIL/ 3 PASS/FAIL	PASS	1ST PLACE	WON	LOST	WON/ LOST	WON	2ND RUNNER-UP
Swings	Code Kunst x Paloalto	PASS	2-PASS	PASS	1ST PLACE	WON	LOST	WON/ WON	WON	3RD RUNNER-UP
Wonstein	Zion T x Giriboy	PASS	ALL-PASS	PASS	1ST PLACE	WON	WON	LOST/ LOST	ELIM	
Khundi Panda	GroovyRoom x Justhis	PASS	ALL-PASS/ 3 PASS/FAIL	PASS	3RD PLACE	LOST	WON	LOST/ WON	ELIM	
Mirani	GroovyRoom x Justhis	PASS	3 FAIL/ 1 PASS/FAIL	PASS	1ST PLACE	WON	WON	WON/ LOST	ELIM	
Untell	Dynamic Duo x Bewhy	PASS	1 FAIL/ 3 PASS/FAIL	PASS	2ND PLACE	WON	LOST	WON/ LOST	ELIM	
Mckdaddy	Code Kunst x Paloalto	PASS	ALL-PASS	PASS	3RD PLACE	LOST	LOST	ELIM		
Munchman	GroovyRoom x Justhis	PASS	ALL-PASS/ 1 PASS/FAIL	PASS	2ND PLACE	LOST	WON	ELIM		
Kaogaii	Dynamic Duo x Bewhy	PASS	ALL-PASS/ 3 PASS/FAIL	PASS	1ST PLACE	LOST	LOST	ELIM		
Chillin Homie	Zion T x Giriboy	PASS	3-PASS	PASS	1ST PLACE	WON	WON	ELIM		
Skyminhyuk	Zion T x Giriboy	PASS	1-PASS	PASS	2ND PLACE	LOST	WON	ELIM		
Heo Sung-hyun	Dynamic Duo x Bewhy	PASS	1-PASS	PASS	3RD PLACE	WON	LOST	ELIM		
Khakii	Code Kunst x Paloalto	PASS	ALL-PASS	PASS	1ST PLACE	WON	ELIM			
dsel	Dynamic Duo x Bewhy	PASS	2-PASS	PASS	2ND PLACE	WON	ELIM			
Kidd King	GroovyRoom x Justhis	PASS	ALL-PASS/ 1 PASS/FAIL	PASS	2ND PLACE	ELIM				
Juvie Train	Code Kunst x Paloalto	PASS	ALL-PASS/ 3 PASS/FAIL	PASS	2ND PLACE	ELIM				
Killagramz	Code Kunst x Paloalto	PASS	ALL-PASS/ 3 PASS/FAIL	PASS	2ND PLACE	ELIM				
Cho Soon-young	Zion T x Giriboy	PASS	3-PASS/ 2 PASS/FAIL	PASS	2ND PLACE	ELIM				
Bruno Champman	Dynamic Duo x Bewhy	PASS	3-PASS/ 2-PASS/FAIL	PASS	1ST PLACE	ELIM				
Chamane	Dynamic Duo x Bewhy	PASS	2 PASS	PASS	1ST PLACE	ELIM				
Lee Gi-wook	Zion T x Giriboy	PASS	2-PASS	PASS	3RD PLACE	ELIM				
Owen*	GroovyRoom x Justhis	PASS	3-PASS*	PASS*	1ST PLACE/ LEFT THE SHOW*					

WINNER The contestant won Show Me the Money 9.
Runner-Up The contestant was the runner-up.
2nd and 3rd Runner-Ups The contestants were 2nd and 3rd Runner-Ups.
ALL-PASS The contestant received an All-Pass on both the first and second judging during the second round.
ALL-PASS + FAIL The contestant an All-Pass in the first judging but received at least 1 fail after the second judging during the second round.
3 PASS The contestant received 1 fails during the second round.
3 PASS + FAIL The contestant received 1 fail in the first judging, and at least 1 fail in the second judging during the second round.
2 PASS The contestant received two fails during the second round.
2 PASS + FAIL The contestant received 2 fails in the first judging, and at least 1 fail in the second judging during the second round.
1 PASS The contestant only received one pass during the second round.
FAIL + PASS/FAIL The contestant initially received an All-fail, Fail + Pass/Fail, or 4 All Pass/Fail scores in the second round, but was revived to join their respective producer team.
ELIM The contestant was eliminated (or in Owen's case, the contestant voluntarily left the show at the end of the round).
WON The contestant's crew won during the Triple Crew Battle.
WON The contestant's crew won during the Soundtrack Battle.
WON The contestant's producer team won the Team Diss Battle.
The contestant did not participate in this round.

WON/WON The contestant won their individual match-up, and their producer team won the team match-up during the 1st Live Performance Round.
WON/LOST The contestant won their individual match-up, but their producer team lost the team match-up during the 1st Live Performance Round.
LOST/WON The contestant lost their individual match-up, but their producer team won the team match-up during the 1st Live Performance Round.
LOST/LOST The contestant lost their individual match-up, and their producer team lost the team match-up during the 1st Live Performance Round.
Italicized - The contestant originally advanced and made it to the final Top 24, but voluntarily left the show.

== Controversies ==
- Owen: In an official statement by MKIT RAIN on October 19, 2020, he, alongside 4 other MKIT RAIN artists, admitted to smoking marijuana in 2019. On October 20, it was announced that he has dropped out of the show. Due to this, Mnet decided to edit him out completely by blurring him starting from episodes 2 to 5, and in episode 6 it showed that he did not perform in the Soundtrack Battle, indicating that he dropped out of the show at this point. Mnet also announced that episode 1 of the show has been removed and re-edited.
- Lobonabeat!: On October 20, 2020, he had posted controversial Instagram stories regarding the legalisation of marijuana and criticised famous Korean rappers for not getting caught by the law for using marijuana. The Instagram stories were then later deleted. Although his a cappella rap was not aired, Mnet announced that he will be edited out of the show as a result of the now recently deleted Instagram stories and his past criminal record of selling illegal drugs.
