= Ifeye =

South Korean girl group

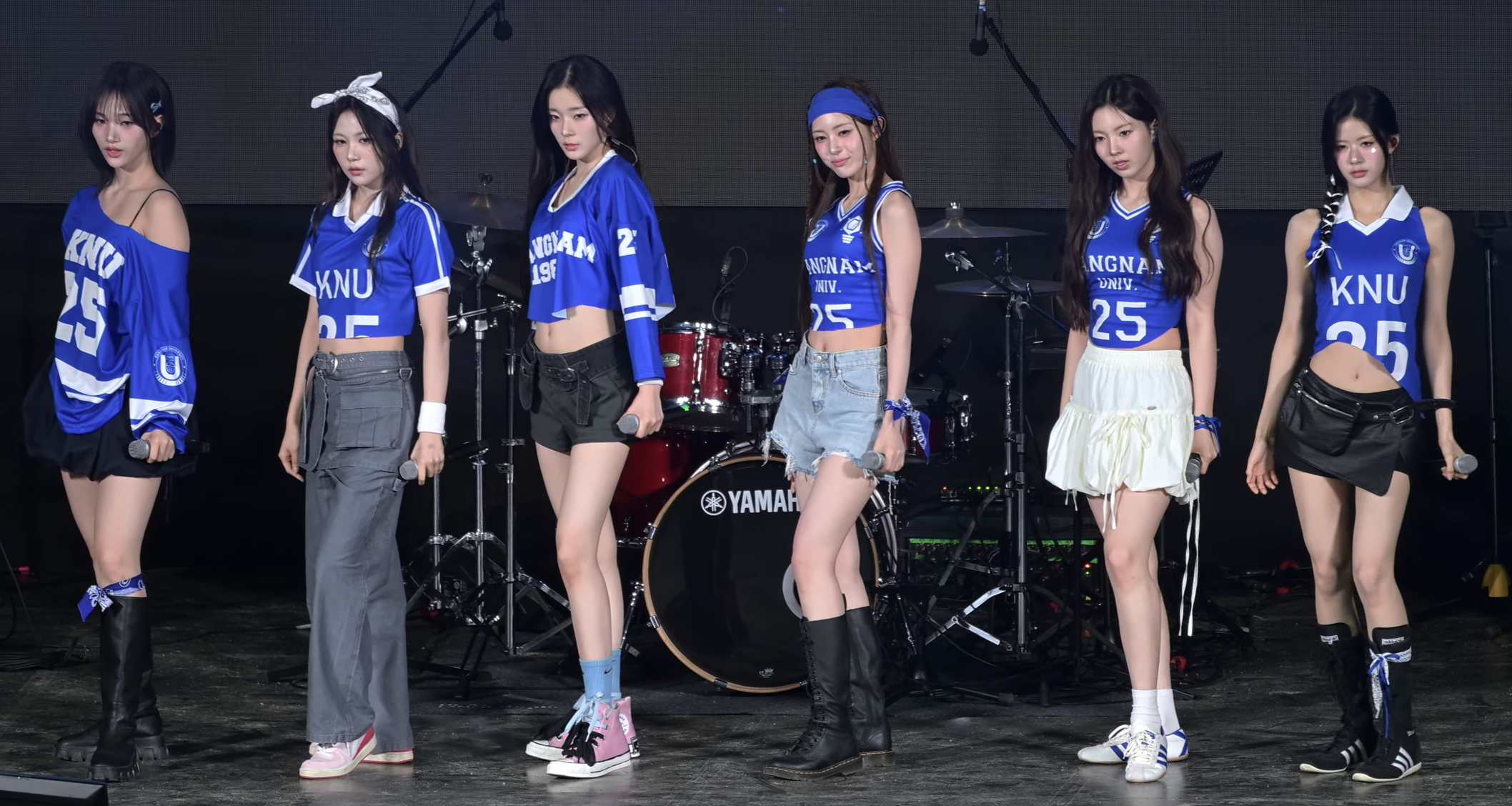
- Ifeye in May 2025: L–R: Sasha, Taerin, Kasia, Won Hwa-yeon, Meu, and Rahee

Background information
- Origin: Seoul, South Korea
- Genre: K-pop
- Years active: 2025–present
- Labels: Hi-Hat, Chorokbaem Music
- Members: Won Hwa-yeon; Taerin; Rahee; Kasia; Meu; Sasha

Ifeye (Korean: 이프아이; stylized in all lowercase) is a South Korean girl group whom was formed by Hi-Hat Entertainment and is currently under Chorokbaem Music Entertainment. The group is composed of six members: Won Hwa-yeon, Taerin, Rahee, Kasia, Meu, and Sasha. The group debuted on April 8, 2025 with the extended play (EP) Erlu Blue.

== Name ==
The name Ifeye represents a perspective that turns imagination into reality. Ifeye is also an acronym for "Imagine & Find, Energetic Young Eyes".

== History ==
=== 2023-2024: Predebut ===
In 2022, Hi-Hat Entertainment, which was founded in 2021, announced its goal for producing global male and female K-pop groups. In November 2023, the company announced its first global audition to be held that December. In March 2024, Hi-Hat Entertainment began preparing to debut a girl group, stating a boy group was still planned to follow. On October 16, the company began releasing concept films revealing the six trainees slated for their upcoming girl group: Lee Ga-yeon (Kasia), Kim Ra-hee, Won Hwa-yeon, Lee Chae-won (Meu), Jung Seo-yul (Sasha), and Choi Ji-woo (Taerin).

=== 2025–present: Debut with Erlu Blue and Following EPs ===
In February 2025, Hi-Hat Entertainment confirmed the six members would debut as Ifeye on April 8. In March, the group released multiple trailer films leading to their debut album. On March 28, the tracklist for the group's debut extended play Erlu Blue (stylized in all caps) was revealed to contain four songs including the title track "Nerdy". At the end of March, teasers were released for the music video for "Nerdy". On April 8, 2025, Ifeye debuted with the release of their digital extended play Erlu Blue along with a music video for the title track "Nerdy".

In June, Hi-Hat Entertainment confirmed Ifeye was preparing their first comeback in July. On July 16, the group released their second EP, Sweet Tang with the title track "r u ok?". On August 1–3, Ifeye performed at KCON LA 2025, performing on the Dance Stage, X Stage, and Pre-show Stage. On August 15, the group performed at the One Universe Festival 2025.

On March 3, Hit-Hat entertainment announced member Sasha would be taking a hiatus due to health issues and that Ifeye would promote as a five member group. Later in March, the company announced that Ifeye would have a comeback on April 15 with their third extended play, titled As If featuring the title track "Hazy (Daisy)". As If was released on the 15th of April. They were moved to Chorokbaem Music in November 2026 after Hit-Hat Entertainment terminated the contracts with the members.

== Endorsements ==
In May 2025, Ifeye was selected as a brand model for the skin care brand Dr. Jart+.

== Members ==
- Won Hwa-yeon (원화연)
- Taerin (태린)
- Rahee (라희)
- Kasia (카시아) – leader
- Meu (미유)
- Sasha (사샤)

== Discography ==
=== Extended plays ===
List of extended plays, showing selected details, selected chart positions, and sales figures
Title	Details	Peak chart positions	Sales
Title	Details	KOR	Sales
Erlu Blue	Released: April 8, 2025; Label: Hi-Hat Entertainment; Formats: Digital download, streaming; Track list: 1. "Nerdy"; 2. "IRL"; 3. "Bubble Up"; 4. "Nerdy" (English version)	—N/a	—N/a
Sweet Tang	Released: July 16, 2025; Label: Hi-Hat Entertainment; Formats: CD, digital download, streaming; Track list: 1. "Loverboy"; 2. "Friend Like Me"; 3. "Round and Round (둥글게 둥글게)"; 4. "ifeye (interlude)" 5. "r u ok?" 6. "Say Moo!"; 7. "Echo"	15	KOR: 23,311
As If	Released: April 15, 2026; Label: Hi-Hat Entertainment; Formats: CD, digital download, streaming; Track list: 1. "I'll Be There"; 2. "Hazy (Daisy)"; 3. "Padam Padam"; 4. "Touch"; 5. "Forever Us"	16	KOR: 24,735

=== Singles ===
List of singles, showing year released, selected chart positions, and name of the album
Title	Year	Peak chart positions	Album
Title	Year	KOR Down.	Album
"Nerdy"	2025	104	Erlu Blue
"r u ok?"	2025	69	Sweet Tang
"Hazy (Daisy)"	2026	87	As If

=== Other charted songs ===
List of songs, showing year released, selected chart positions, and name of the album
Title	Year	Peak chart positions	Album
Title	Year	KOR Down.	Album
"Friend Like Me"	2025	187	Sweet Tang

=== Music videos ===
Title	Year	Director(s)	Ref.
"Nerdy"	2025	Ximin Oh	
"r u ok?"	2025	watchingthehappening	
"Hazy (Daisy)"	2026	You Wonsik , Kwon Yongsoo	
"loverfory"	2026	Rahee (Ifeye)	

== Accolades ==
=== Listicles ===
Name of publisher, year listed, name of listicle, and placement
Publisher	Year	Listicle	Placement	Ref.
NME	2026	The NME 100	Placed	
