= Epaksa =

South Korean Techno-trot singer

Epaksa 이박사 (李博士)
- Also known as: Monkey Magic, Moñas, Ceporro, Dr. Lee
- Born: Lee Yong-Seok; October 5, 1954 (age 72)
- Origin: Gyeonggi-do, South Korea
- Genres: Techno-trot, comedy music
- Occupation: Singer
- Years active: 1989–present
- Label: Universal D

- Korean name
- Hangul: 이용석
- RR: I Yongseok
- MR: I Yongsŏk

Stage name
- Hangul: 이박사
- Hanja: 李博士
- RR: Ibaksa
- MR: Ibaksa

Epaksa (Korean: 이박사; Hanja: 李博士; Korean pronunciation: [ibɐk̚s͈ɐ]; Born October 5, 1954) is a South Korean Techno-trot singer. his birth name is Lee Yong-Seok (Korean: 이용석). "Techno-trot" (Korean: 테크노 뽕짝) is a fusion genre of music which was popular in 1990s and early 2000s, and was well known as speedy tempo.

== Discography ==
- Sinbaram Epaksa Vol. 1 (1989)
- Encyclopedia of Pon-Chak Party 1 & 2 (1996.04)
- 2002 E-Pak-Sa's Space Odyssey (1996)
- 5 cm Higher and Rising! (1996)
- I'm Space Fantasy (with Maywa Denki) (1997)
- Space Fantasy (1st album) (2000.07)
- Winter Tech-Pon (2000.11.22)
- Pak Sa Revolution & Emotion (2nd album) (2001.01)
- Asura-Bal-Bal-Ta (2012.08.23)

== Filmography ==
=== Television appearances ===
- 2020, King of Mask Singer (MBC): Contestant as "Firefly" (Episode 279)
