= Chungcheong dialect =

Dialect of the Korean language

Chungcheong
- 충청도 방언
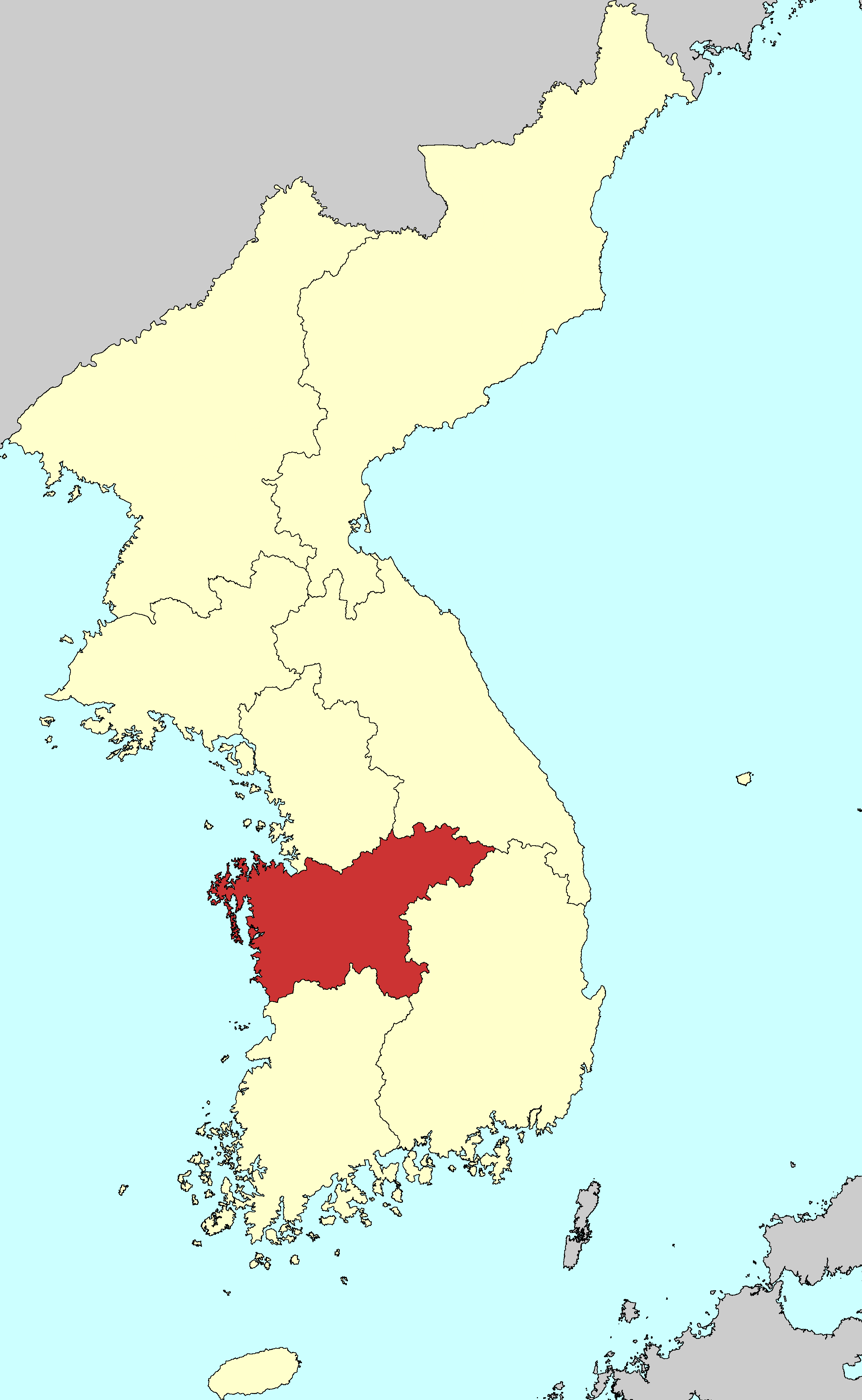
- Native to: South Korea
- Region: Hoseo
- Language family: Koreanic: Korean; Central; Chungcheong
- Dialects: Northern; Southern

Language codes
- ISO 639-3: –
- Glottolog: chun1247

- Chungcheong dialect
- Hangul: 충청도 방언
- Hanja: 忠淸道方言
- RR: Chungcheong-do bangeon
- MR: Ch'ungch'ŏng-do pangŏn

The Chungcheong dialects of the Korean language are spoken in the Chungcheong (Hoseo) region of South Korea, including the metropolitan city of Daejeon. It may also include several areas in Gyeonggi Province, most notably Pyeongtaek, that are adjacent to Chungcheong Province. Chungcheong dialect can be divided into two categories: the Northern Chungcheong dialect, notable for its similarity to the Gyeonggi dialect, and the Southern dialect, which is similar to the Jeolla dialect. This dialect is notable for its slow enunciations, vowel changes, and unique jargon. However, as Seoul expands and standard language supremacy spreads, young people in Chungcheong Province, including Daejeon and Sejong, do not use original dialect, or use very little of it. Most young people use standard language and dialect alternately, and in cities located just below the Seoul metropolitan area (Sudogwon), like Cheonan, dialect is on the verge of extinction.

== Pronunciation ==
=== Vowels ===
Similar to the Jeolla dialect, Chungcheong dialect often transforms the vowel <ㅑ> (ya) into <ㅕ> (yeo), <ㅐ> (ae) into <ㅑ> (ya) or <ㅕ> (yeo), and <ㅔ> (e) into <ㅣ> (i). Linguist Do Suhee reports that the Chungcheong dialect experiences an umlaut, resulting in changes like <ㅏ> (a) raising to <ㅔ> (e) and <ㅡ> (ɨ) fronting to become <ㅣ> (i), triggered by a nearby high vowel /i/ or glide /j/.

And there is a characteristic that is observed only in the Chungcheong dialect, which is that the vowel <ㅛ> (yo) is changed to <ㅠ> (yu).

For example:

Standard Korean	Chungcheong Dialect	English translation
"맞아요" [maj-ayo] or "그래요" [geuraeyo]	"맞어유" [maj-eoyu] or "겨유/그려유" [gyeoyu/geuryeoyu]	"That's right"
"타세요" [taseyo]	"타슈(타셔유)" [tasyu(tasyeoyu)]	"Get in" or "Hop in"
"맛있죠?" [mas-issjyo?]	"맛있쥬?(맛있지유?)" [mas-issjyu?(mas-issjiyu?)]	"It's tasty, right?"

=== Consonants ===
Do Suhee found that the Chungcheong dialect increases the tenseness of lax stops when in the initial position. For example, the lax stops <ㄱ,ㄷ,ㅂ> (k, t, p) transform into /ㄲ, ㄸ, ㅃ/ (kk, tt, pp) when in the word-initial position.

== Grammar ==
In Standard Korean, various expressions are used like <-ni> (-니), <-eo> (-어) and <-n geoya> (-ㄴ 거야) when asked questions, while in Chungcheong dialect, most of them use <-n gyeo> (-ㄴ 겨) when asked questions.

For example:

Standard Korean	Chungcheong Dialect	English translation
"가는 거야?" [Ganeun geoya?] or "가니?" [Gani?] or "가?" [Ga?]	"가는 겨?" [Ganeun gyeo?]	"Are you going?"
"뭐하는 거야?" [Mwohaneun geoya?] or "뭐하니?" [Mwohani?] or "뭐해?" [Mwohae?]	"뭐하는 겨?" [Mwohaneun gyeo?]	"What are you doing?"
"밥 먹었니?" [Bab meogeot-ní?] or "밥 먹었어?" [Bab meogeo-sséo?]	"밥은 먹은 겨?" [Bab-eun meog-eun gyeo?]	"Did you eat?"

== Geographical subdivisions ==
=== Northern Chungcheong ===
The representative cities of this dialect region include Cheongju (청주) and Chungju (충주).

In the case of this region, the accent is also weaker than the dialect region of Southern Chungcheong, and the local identity is not clear because it borders more regions than South Chungcheong Province, such as Gyeonggi Province, Gangwon Province, and Gyeongsang Province.

Therefore, the northern part of North Chungcheong Province, where Chungju is located, was affected by the Gyeonggi dialect, and the northeastern part of North Chungcheong Province was affected by the Gangwon dialect and Gyeongsang dialect. In the central part of North Chungcheong Province, where Cheongju is located, was affected by the South Chungcheong Province dialect because it was in contact with Daejeon and Sejong, and in the southern part of North Chungcheong Province, was affected by the South Chungcheong Province dialect, Jeolla dialect, and Gyeongsang dialect.

=== Southern Chungcheong ===
The representative cities of this dialect region include Daejeon (대전), Sejong (세종) and Cheonan (천안).

In this area, it can be divided into four dialect regions.

1. The first Dialect Region
  - Areas belonging to this dialect region belong to Gyeonggi Province, such as Pyeongtaek (평택) and Anseong (안성), but are adjacent to South Chungcheong Province, so they share dialects with each other.
2. The second Dialect Region
  - This dialect symbolizes the dialect of the area adjacent to Gyeonggi Province, such as Cheonan (천안) and Asan (아산).
3. The third Dialect Region
  - The representative areas of this dialect region include Daejeon (대전), Sejong (세종) and Gongju (공주). Unlike most Chungcheong dialect regions, which are classified as central dialect, this dialect region is classified as southern dialect such as Jeolla dialect and Gyeongsang dialect.
4. The fourth Dialect Region
  - In the case of this dialect, it is also called the Naepo dialect zone, and it includes the northwestern regions of South Chungcheong Province, which borders the West Sea. Typical areas include Yesan (예산) and Hongseong (홍성), where Chungnam Provincial Government is located. Baek Jong Won is from this dialect region.

== Distinct phrases ==
The most widely known and representative of Chungcheong dialect is that the standard pronunciation <ㅛ> (yo) is changed to <ㅠ> (yu). To be exact, the standard language honorifics <~요> (~yo) is pronounced as <~유> (~yu) and <~슈> (~shu) in the dialect of Chungcheong.

The Chungcheong dialect usually replaces the standard '~겠다' (gettda) at the end of sentences with '~것다' (geotda) and '근디'(geundi) (but) instead of '그런데' (geureonde). Chungcheong people may occasionally pronounce the ending form '~이니까' (inikka) with '~이니께' (inikke). Such phrases may also be found in Southern Gyeonggi, where influence from the Chungcheong dialect was often quite noticeable.

In North Chungcheong Province, people use '그려' (geulyeo) instead of '맞아' (mat-a) or '그래' (geulae) and in South Chungcheong Province, they also use '기여' (giyeo) in addition to '그려' (geulyeo).

== Perceptions of the Chungcheong dialect ==
The general impression surrounding the Chungcheong dialect includes the slow pace of speech and the relaxedness of speech. In general, the Chungcheong dialect that people in other regions feel is "relaxed and cute." Of course, this assessment is the case for those who view the Chungcheong dialect positively. People who dislike Chungcheong dialects evaluated Chungcheong dialects as "dazed, frustrating." Chungcheong dialect is the most popular dialect in Korea after Gyeongsang and Jeolla dialects. However, Chungcheong dialect users are less proud of their local dialects than Jeolla and Gyeongsang dialects. According to the 2020 survey of the people's language awareness, 22.5% of Gyeongsang-do dialects and 10.3% of Jeolla dialects were found in the most commonly used languages, while only 7.1% of Chungcheong dialects were found. Despite the fact that the population of Chungcheong Province is larger than that of Jeolla Province. And 33% of Chungcheong dialect speakers responded positively to the current standard language and the local dialect recognized as multiple standard language in their area. Compared to 44.7 percent and 43.4 percent of the respondents in Jeolla and Gyeongsang provinces, respectively, the number is relatively small. The media's influence on Chungcheong people's lower self-esteem in their local language was significant. In the case of people who use Chungcheong dialect in the media, most of them appear as slaves or ordinary people in the Joseon Dynasty, or housewives from rich families, or poor farmers. (For reference, Chungcheong Province had the highest proportion of yangban(aristocrat) in the Joseon Dynasty. Thus, to this day, the characteristics of Yangban and the characteristics of Chungcheong people overlap, and it is often said that Chungcheong-do aristocrats.) In addition, South Korea implemented a policy of spreading standard language nationwide in the 1970s and 1980s, which gave the public the perception that 'standard language is superior and dialects are inferior'. For these complex reasons, Chungcheong dialect speakers have lower self-esteem for their local dialects than Jeolla and Gyeongsang dialect speakers.
