= 2025 in South Korean music =

The following is a list of notable events and releases that happened in 2025 in music in South Korea.

== Award shows and festivals ==
=== Award ceremonies ===
2025 music award ceremonies in South Korea
Date	Event	Host	Ref.
January 4 and 5	39th Golden Disc Awards	Ilgan Sports and JTBC Plus	
February 15 and 16	32nd Hanteo Music Awards	Hanteo Global	
February 22	1st D Awards	Sports Donga	
February 27	22nd Korean Music Awards	Ministry of Culture, Sports and Tourism	
June 21	34th Seoul Music Awards	Y Global Music and Sports Seoul	
November 14 and 15	2025 Korea Grand Music Awards	Ilgan Sports	
November 28 and 29	2025 MAMA Awards	CJ E&M	
December 6	10th Asia Artist Awards	Star News and Star Continent	
December 20	17th Melon Music Awards	Kakao Entertainment	

=== Festivals ===
2025 televised music festivals in South Korea
Date	Event	Host	Ref.
July 26 and 27	SBS Gayo Daejeon: Summer	Seoul Broadcasting System (SBS)	
December 19	KBS Song Festival	Korean Broadcasting System (KBS)	
December 25	SBS Gayo Daejeon: Winter	Seoul Broadcasting System (SBS)	

== Debuting and disbanding in 2025 ==
=== Debuting groups ===
==== Male groups ====
- &Team
- 1Verse
- 3way
- AHOF
- Am8ic
- AxMxP
- Be Boys
- Close Your Eyes
- Cortis
- Idid
- Idntt
- In A Minute
- KickFlip
- Kik
- Newbeat
- Nouera
- Re:wind
- Skinz
- Sweet:ch

===== Sub-units =====
- Hoshi X Woozi
- S.Coups X Mingyu
- ZooniZini

==== Female groups ====
- Ablume
- AtHeart
- Baby Dont Cry
- Hearts2Hearts
- Hitgs
- Ifeye
- Ixia
- KiiiKiii
- Kiiras
- Smorz
- UDTT
- Uspeer
- VVS

===== Sub-units =====
- Moon Sua X Siyoon
- UAU

==== Co-ed and unclassified groups ====
- AllDay Project
- Xlov

=== Solo debuts ===
- Bae Jin-young
- Beomgyu
- Chaeyoung
- Chuei Liyu
- Haechan
- Yim Si-wan
- Lim Se-jun
- Mark
- Minnie
- Seunghan
- Yeji

=== Disbandments ===
- As One
- ATBO
- Mytro
- Luminous
- Superkind
- Purple Kiss

=== Reunions and re-establishments ===
- Deux
- GFriend
- Momoland
- Nine Muses

== Releases in 2025 ==
=== First quarter ===
==== January ====
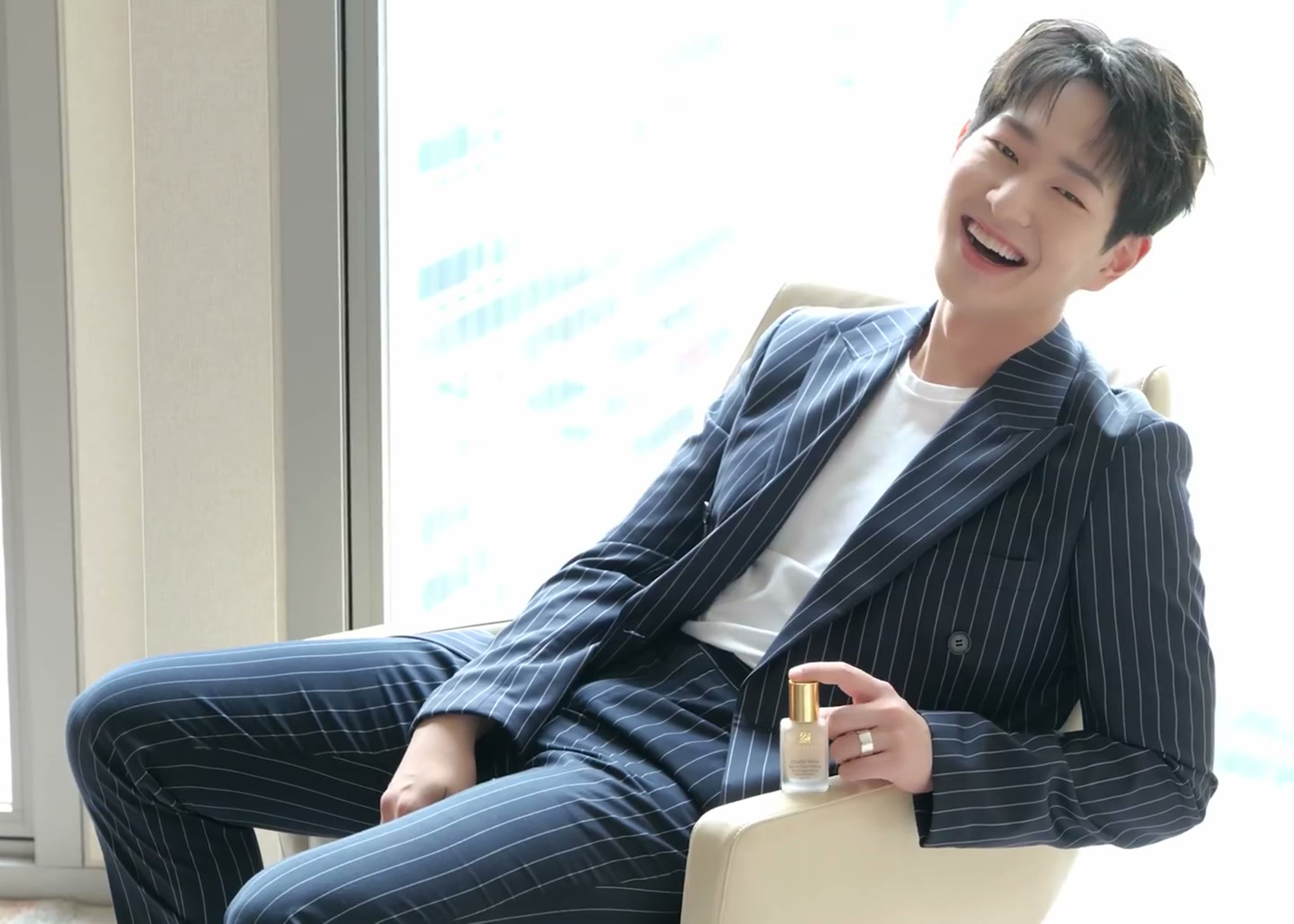
Onew released his fifth EP, Connection, on January 6.

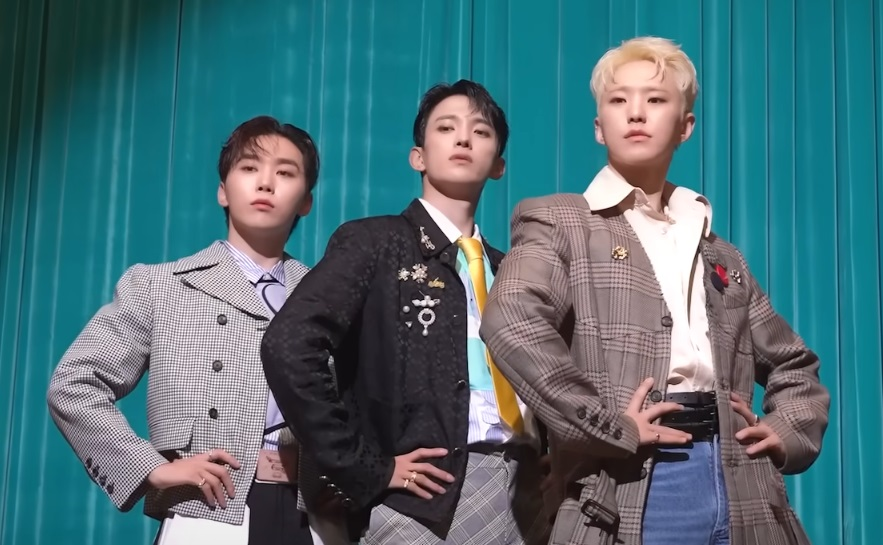
Seventeen spin-off BSS released their second single album, Teleparty, on January 8.

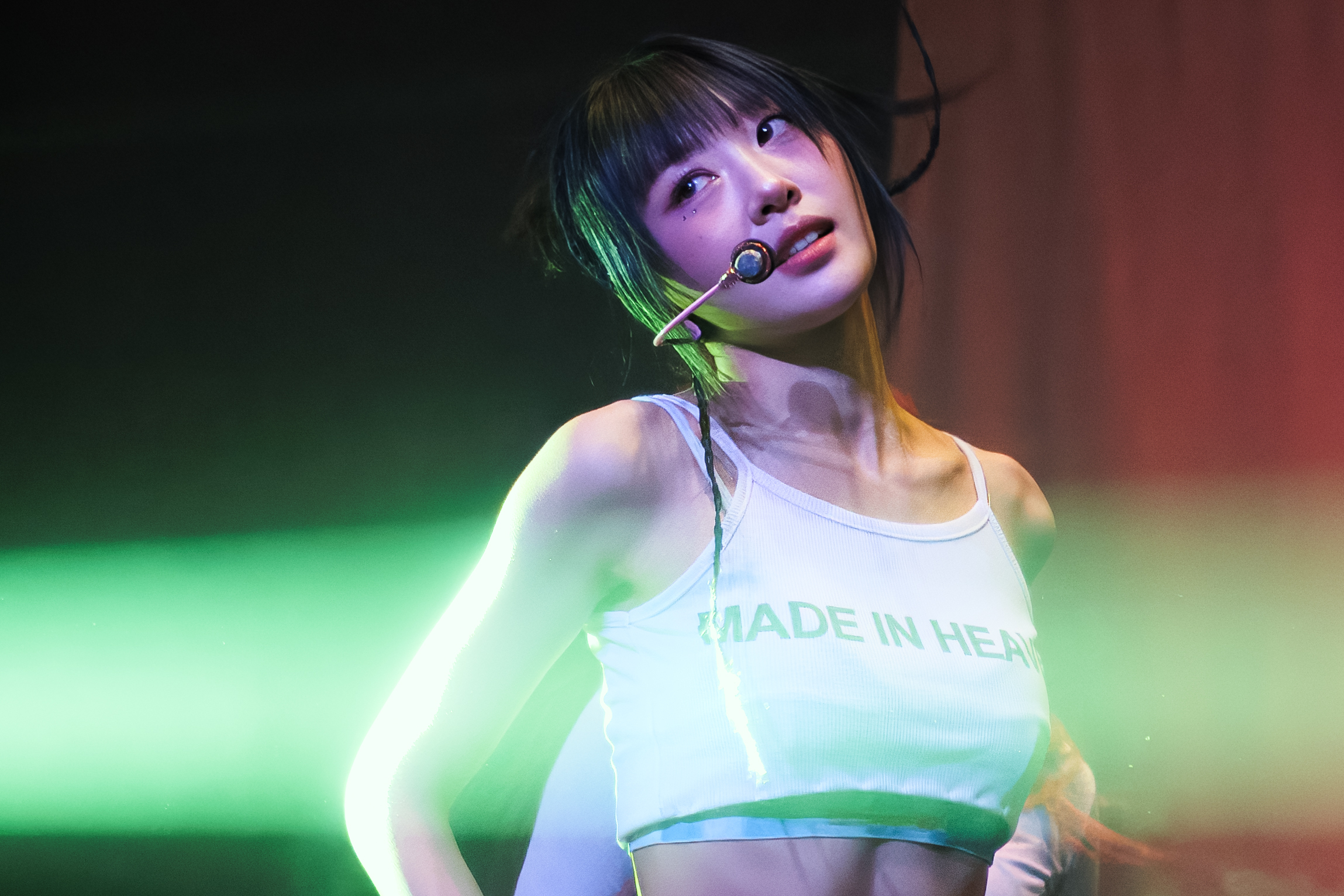
Yves released a deluxe edition of her second EP, I Did: Bloom, on January 17.

Date	Album	Artist(s)	Ref.
4	Somewhere Out There	M.O.N.T	
6	Connection	Onew	
7	Hakunamatata	Crezl	
7	I'mma Be	Xlov	
8	K-Flip	Sik-K, Lil Moshpit	
8	Teleparty	BSS	
9	Glorious Youth	2Z	
10	4444: Reborn	Woosung	
13	Ocean	Park Ji-hyeon	
13	Season of Memories	GFriend	
14	Dear Life	An Shinae	
14	Dear.M	Oneus	
14	Playground	Kandis	
15	Love 2	BB Girls	
15	The Feelings	WEi	
15	Unspoken Goodbye	Hynn	
16	Why Are You Always Like This?	Giriboy	
17	I Did: Bloom (Deluxe)	Yves	
20	Flip It, Kick It!	KickFlip	
20	Winter Heptagon	Got7	
21	Her	Minnie	
21	Sincerely Yours (10th Anniversary Edition)	Paul Kim	
23	Clover #2	Boramiyu	
23	Thunder Fever	CIX	
27	Explorer	Eunhyuk	

==== February ====
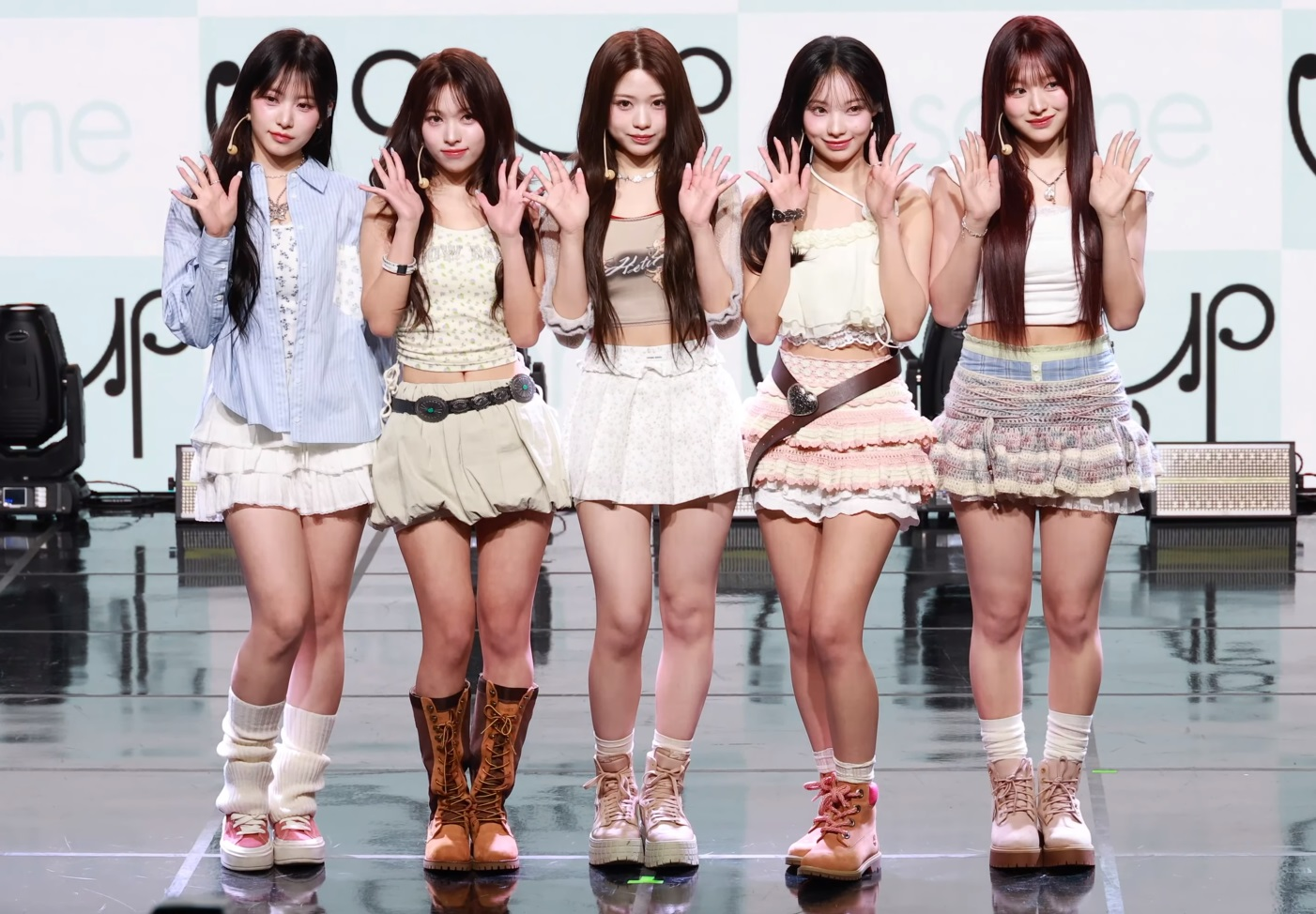
Rescene released their second EP, Glow Up, on February 5.

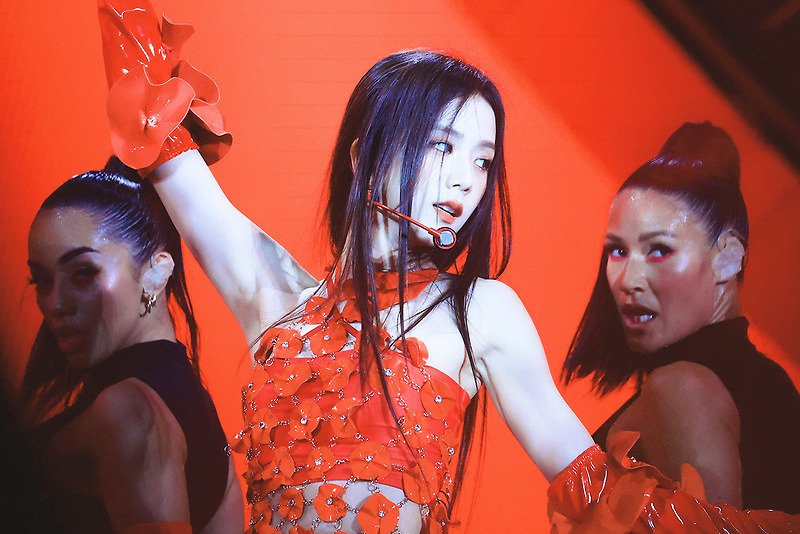
Jisoo released her debut EP, Amortage, on February 14.

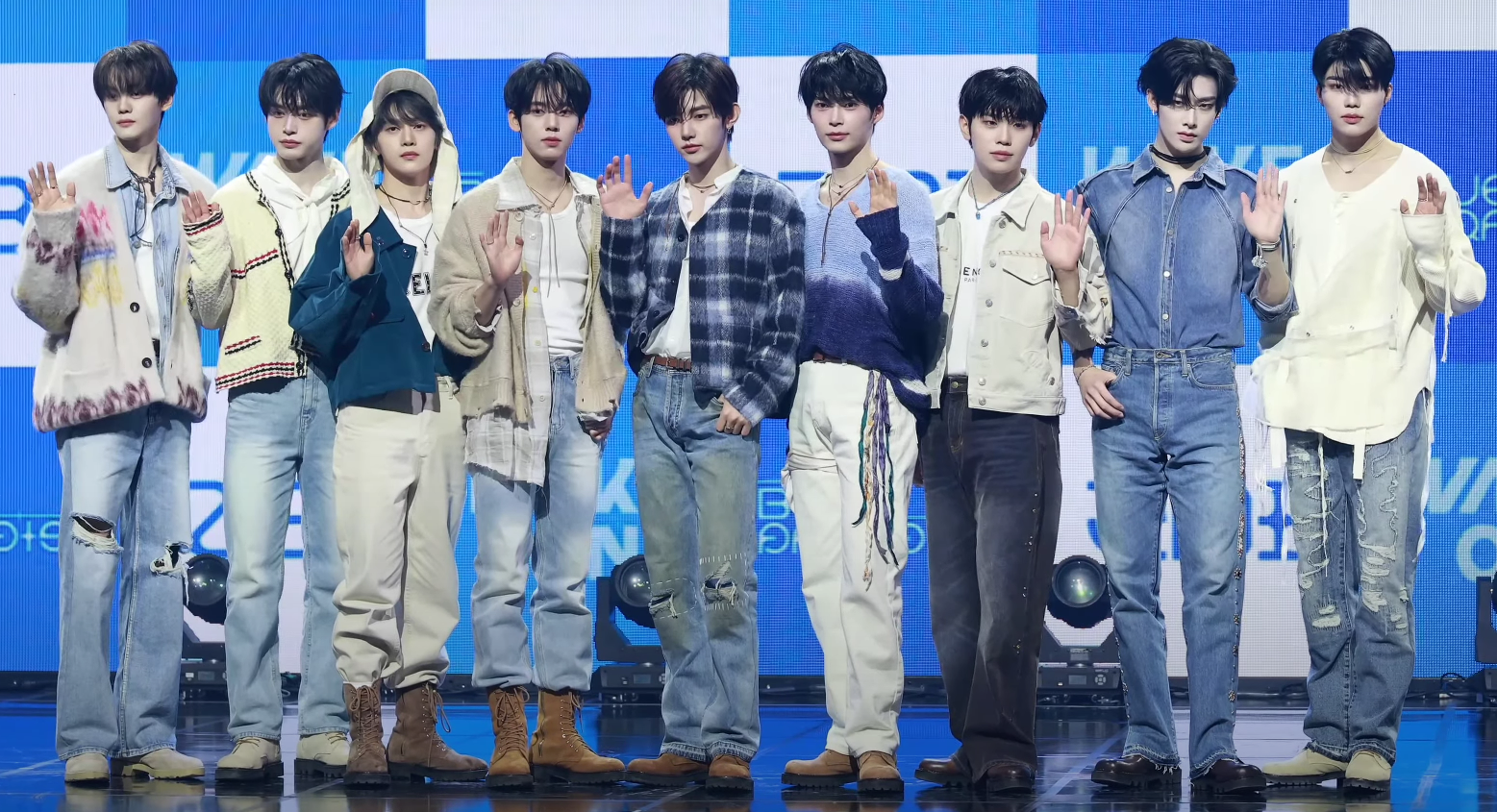
Zerobaseone released their fifth Korean EP, Blue Paradise, on February 24.

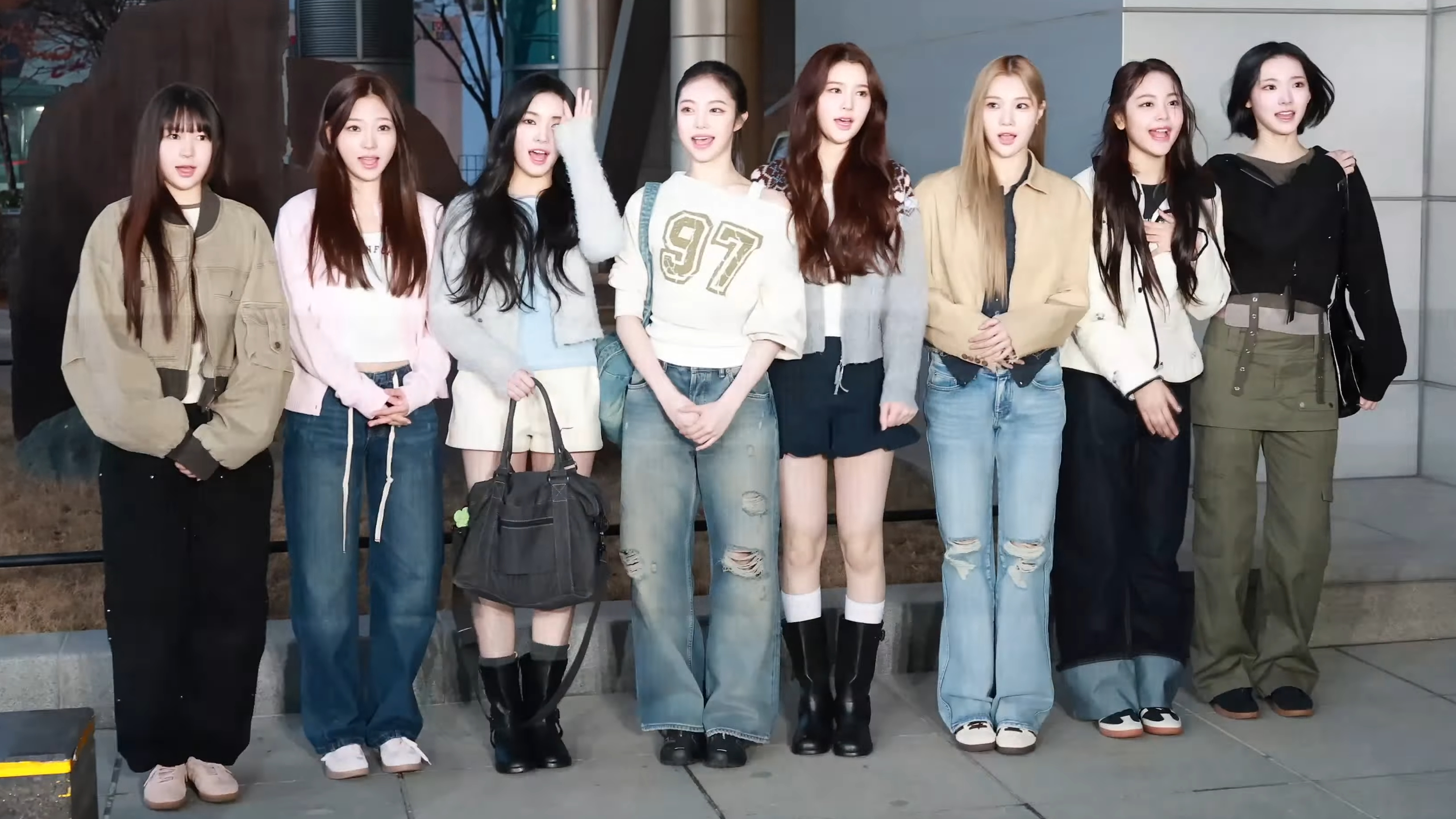
Hearts2Hearts released their debut single album, The Chase, on February 24.

Date	Album	Artist(s)	Ref.
2	4study4work4inst Vol.2	TripleS	
3	Caligo Pt.1	Plave	
3	Ive Empathy	Ive	
4	Smoke Point	All(H)Ours	
5	Glow Up	Rescene	
10	Hot Mess	Evnne	
11	Gain;Moon	Song Ga-in	
12	Alivio	Chung Ha	
12	Untold Story	Lue Young-hoon	
13	Meanwhile	Olivia Marsh	
14	2025 SM Town: The Culture, the Future	SM Town	
14	Amortage	Jisoo	
14	Madein Forever	Madein	
14	Pink Crush	One Pact	
14	Under My	I:Mond	
15	2.5 Vibes	Meenoi	
18	Glowy Day	Xodiac	
18	Nu Kidz: Out the Box	ARrC	
18	ONF: My Identity	ONF	
19	Butterfly	Lun8	
22	Liminal	Summer Cake	
24	Blue Paradise	Zerobaseone	
24	Hello from the Other Side	Kenta Sanggyun	
24	The Chase	Hearts2Hearts	
25	Übermensch	G-Dragon	
26	Chapter: New Is Now	Nouera	
26	Flowering	Gyubin	
26	Odyssey	YB	
26	On My Way	Lim Young-min	
27	All of Me	Hwang Chi-yeul	
27	Highway	3way	
27	The Lovers Note	Hong Isaac	
28	Ma Lil Planet	NIve	

==== March ====
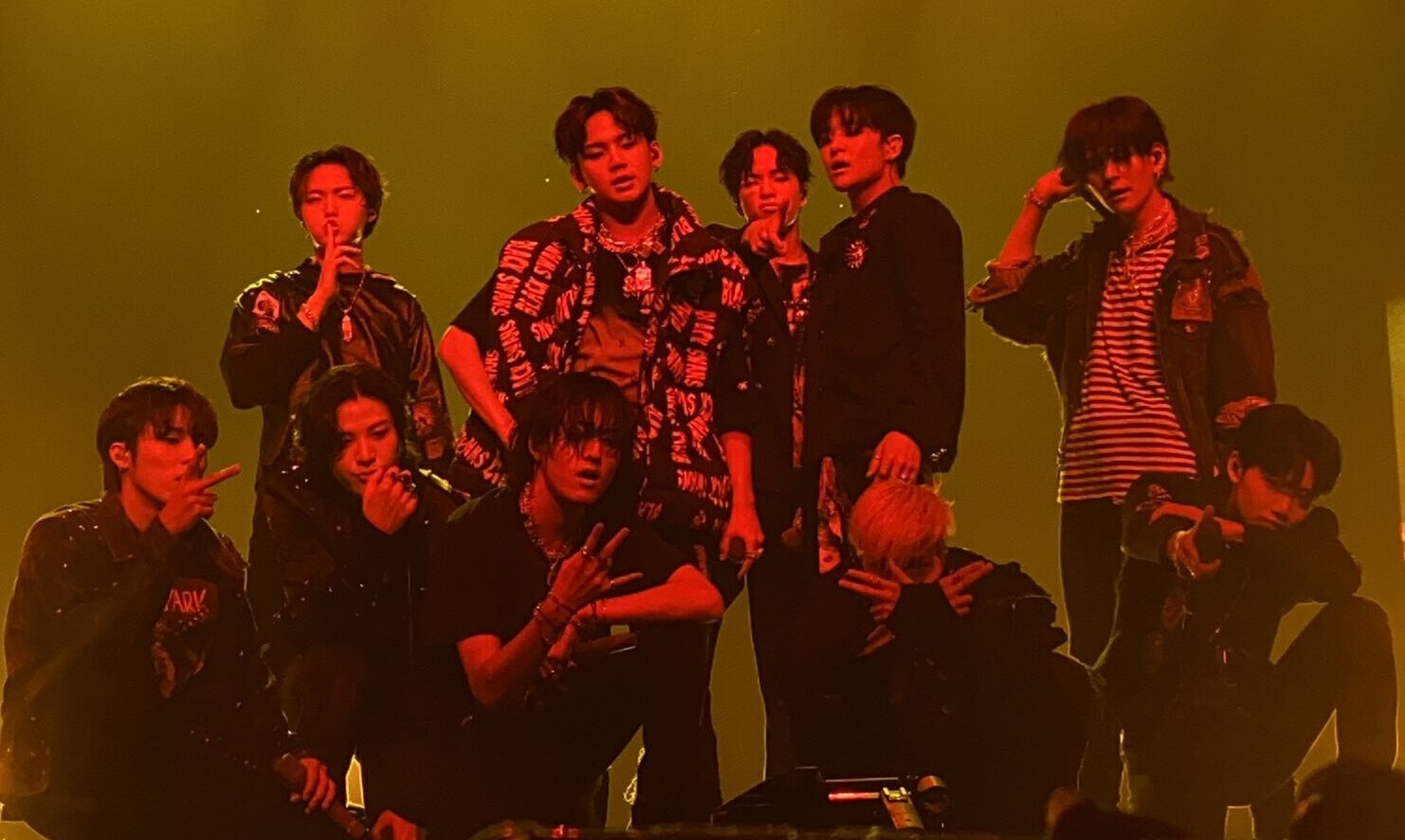
Treasure released their third EP, Pleasure, on March 7.

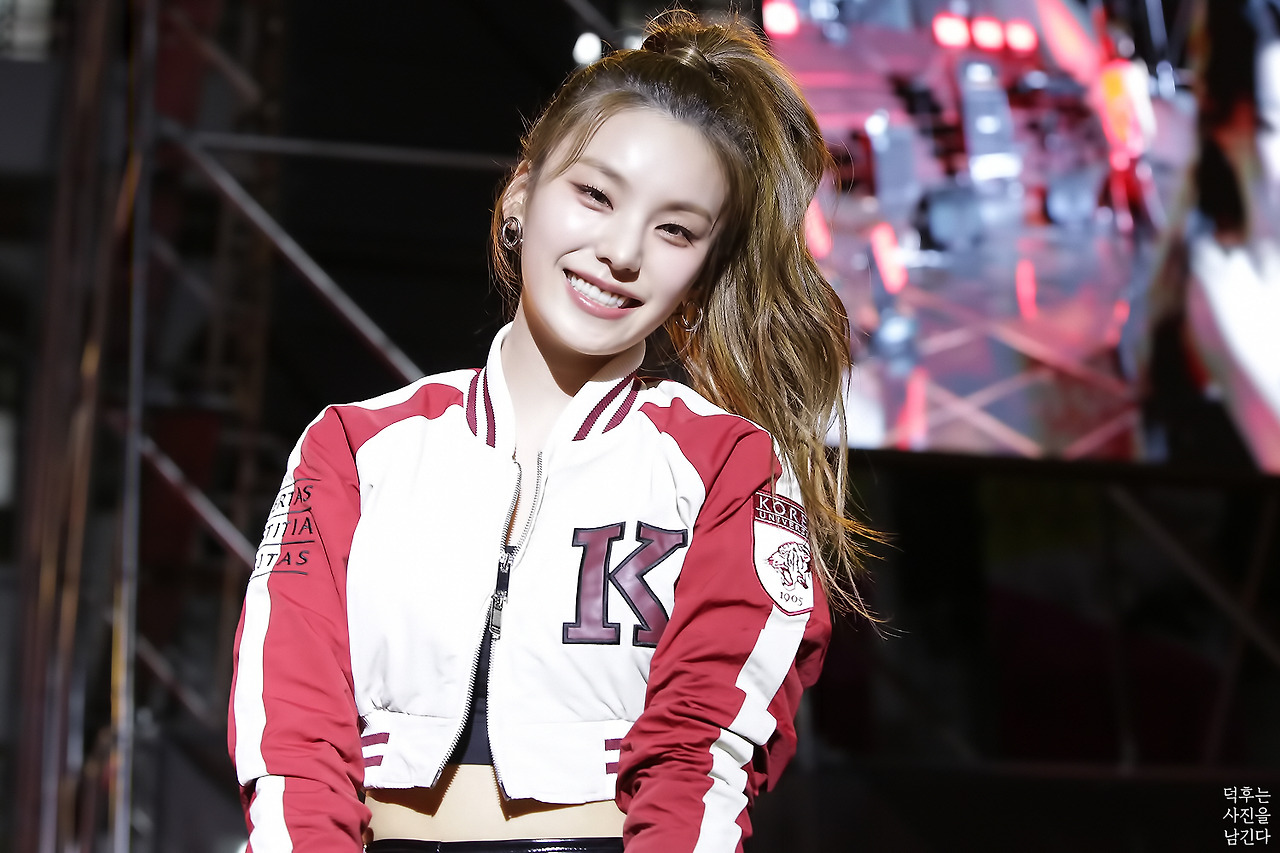
Yeji released her debut EP, Air, on March 10.

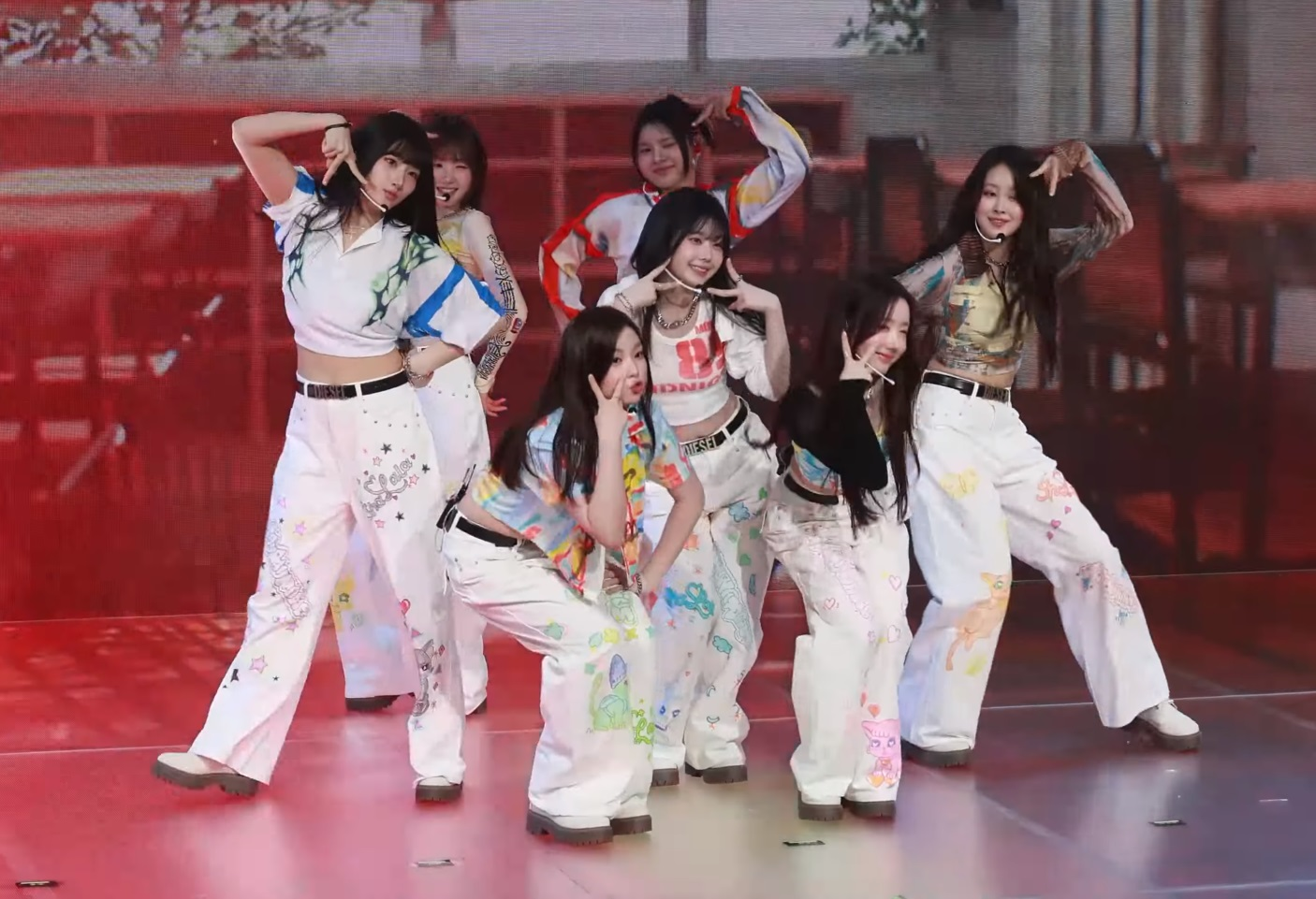
Say My Name released their second EP, My Name Is..., on March 13.

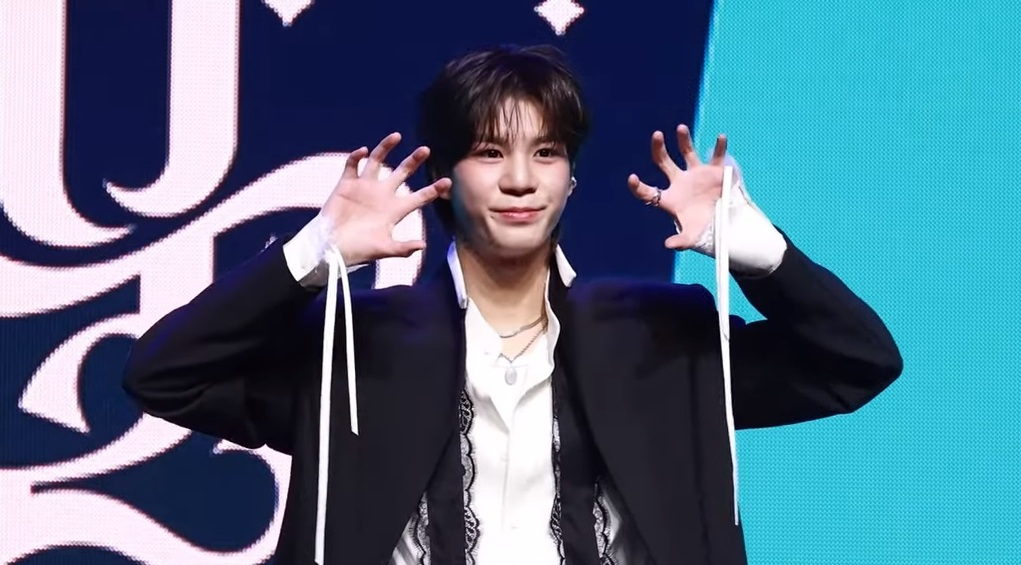
Jeong Dong-won released his fourth studio album, The Gift of Daddy-Long-Legs, on March 13.

Date	Album	Artist(s)	Ref.
2	Cold	Young Posse	
3	Thrilled	Yu Soo-hyun	
4	Leggo	8Turn	
5	BToday	BtoB	
5	We: Dream Chaser	Onewe	
6	Act Like That	Genblue	
6	Like Infinite	Infinite	
7	Pleasure	Treasure	
7	Ruby	Jennie	
7	Seize the Day	W24	
10	Accidentally on Purpose	Seulgi	
10	Air	Yeji	
10	Beam	Hoshi X Woozi	
10	Interview X	Xiumin	
10	Over Track	NTX	
11	I Am	Shin Soo-hyun	
11	Love Race	SF9	
13	My Name Is...	Say My Name	
13	The Gift of Daddy-Long-Legs	Jeong Dong-won	
14	Hot	Le Sserafim	
15	Unboxing: What You Wanted	In A Minute	
17	Fe3O4: Forward	Nmixx	
17	Unexpected	The Boyz	
17	Only One Story	The Wind	
18	S	STAYC	
19	Not Out	Dragon Pony	
20	(Me)moir	Ailee	
20	Undeniable	Fantasy Boys	
21	Mixtape: Dominate	Stray Kids	
24	Beautiful Mind	Xdinary Heroes	
24	Raw and Rad	Newbeat	
24	Stunner	Ten	
24	Uncut Gem	KiiiKiii	
26	For Real?	TNX	
27	Luminous	Eastshine	
28	E	Effie	
31	Love Line	NiziU	
31	Re: Full of Youth	Tempest	

=== Second quarter ===
==== April ====
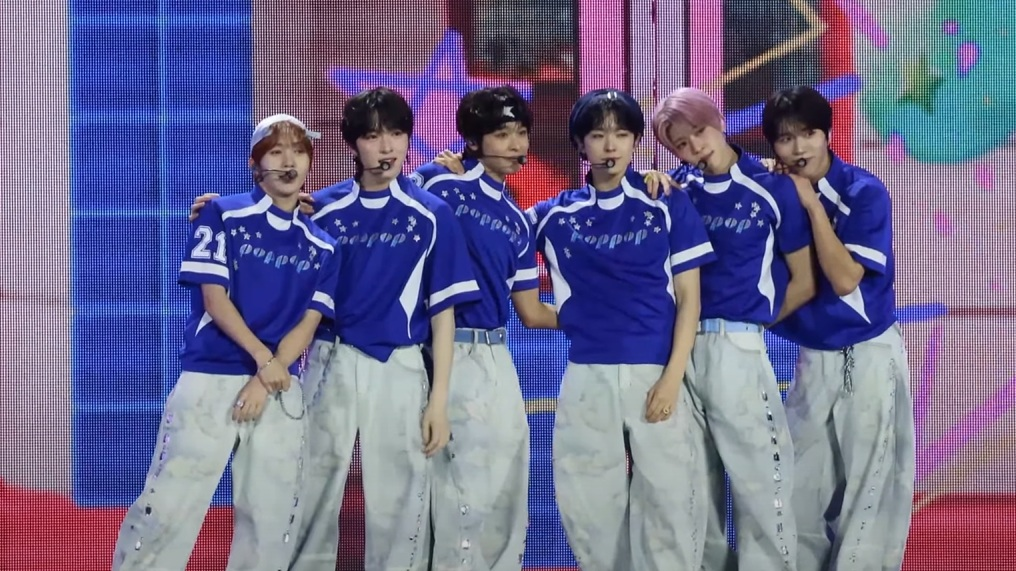
NCT Wish released their second EP, Poppop, on April 14.

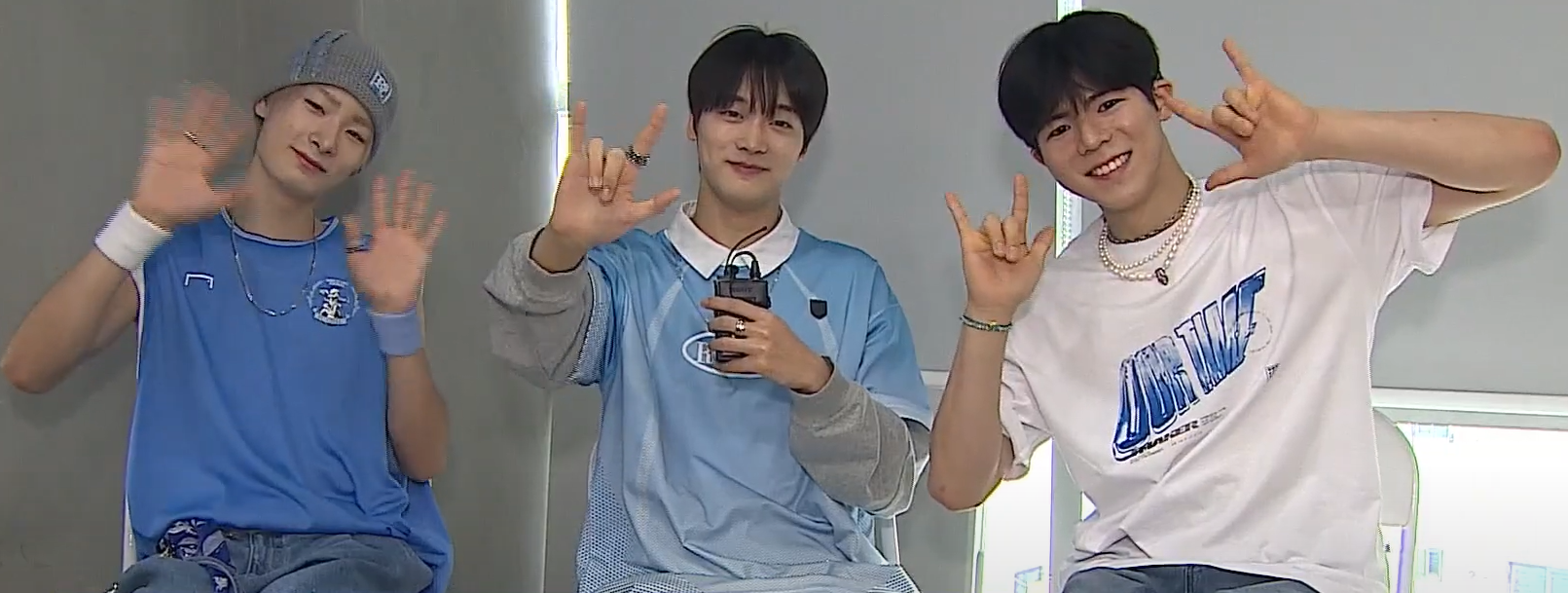
Big Ocean released their second EP, Underwater, on April 20.

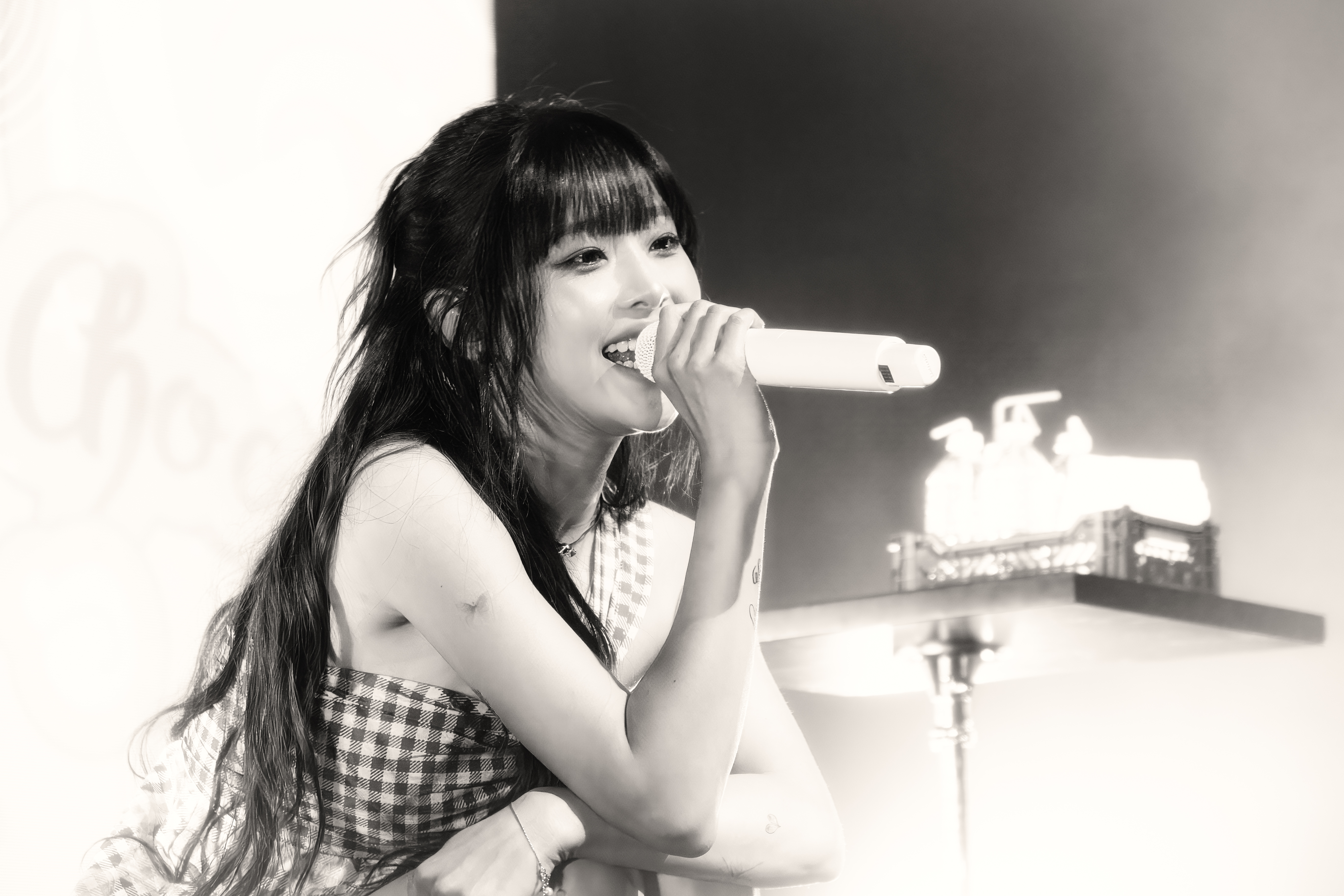
Chuu released her third EP, Only Cry in the Rain, on April 21.

Date	Album	Artist(s)	Ref.
2	Eternalt	Close Your Eyes	
4	House of Tricky: Spur	Xikers	
5	One	Choi Soo-ho	
7	The Firstfruit	Mark	
8	D's Wave	Daesung	
8	Erlu Blue	Ifeye	
8	Wild & Free	Ampers&One	
9	Bang Out	Whib	
10	I Tend to Get Tongue-tied	Giriboy	
14	Poppop	NCT Wish	
14	Silence Syndrome	82Major	
15	I Like You	Odd Youth	
15	Swicy	Unis	
17	Flex Line	TIOT	
20	Underwater	Big Ocean	
21	Only Cry in the Rain	Chuu	
21	Try with Us	TWS	
21	Wait on Me	Kai	
22	She	Niel	
23	Wajangchang	Lucy	
23	Youni-T	Younite	
24	It Just Happened	Cheeze	
25	The Dreamest	Kwon Jin-ah	
28	From Real to Surreal	Highlight	
28	O-RLY?	Nexz	
28	Sound of Music Pt. 1	Jannabi	
29	Day & Night	Fifty Fifty	
29	Romance Express	MeloMance	
29	School Rush	UDTT	

==== May ====
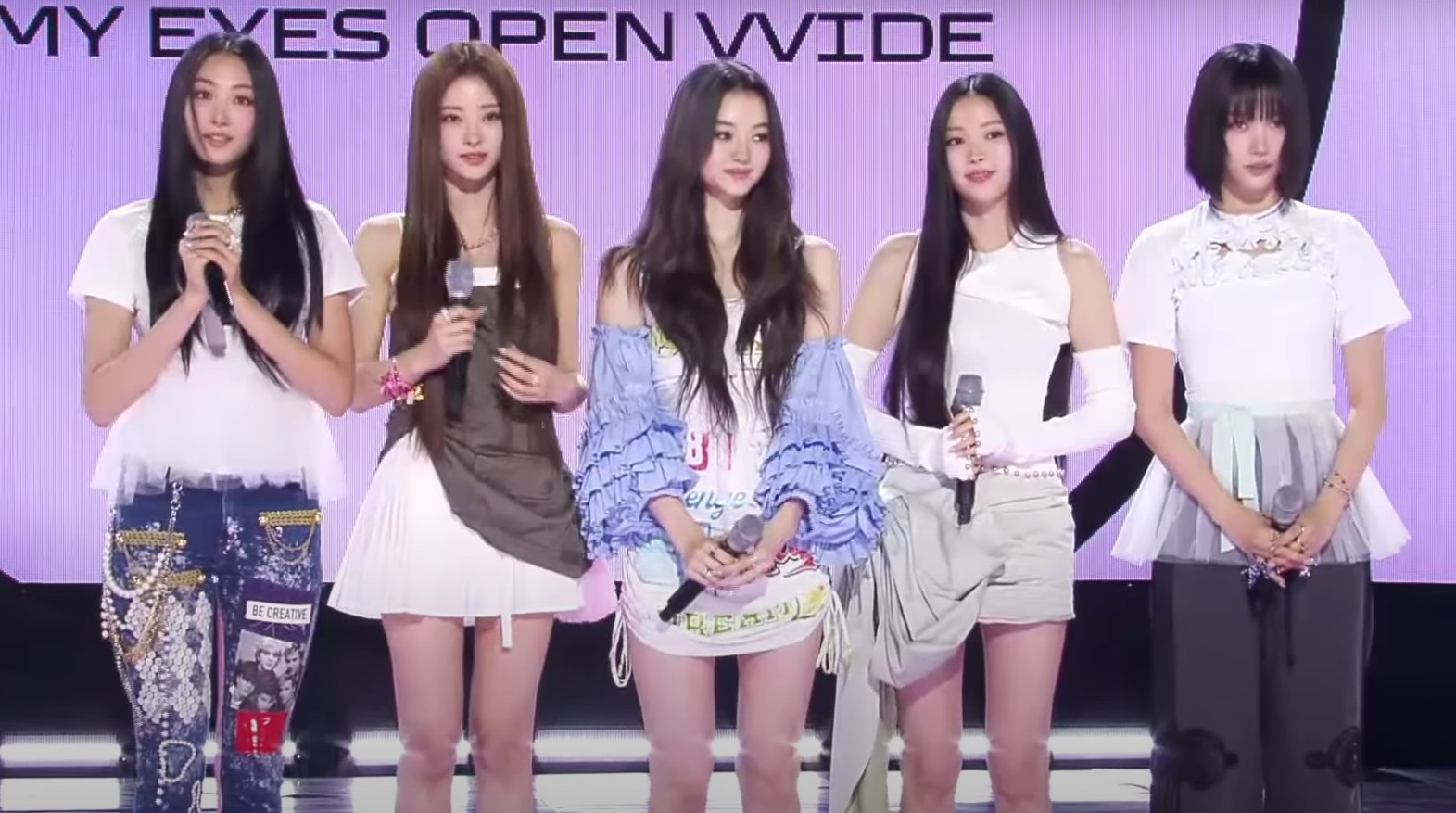
Meovv released their first EP, My Eyes Open VVide, on May 12.

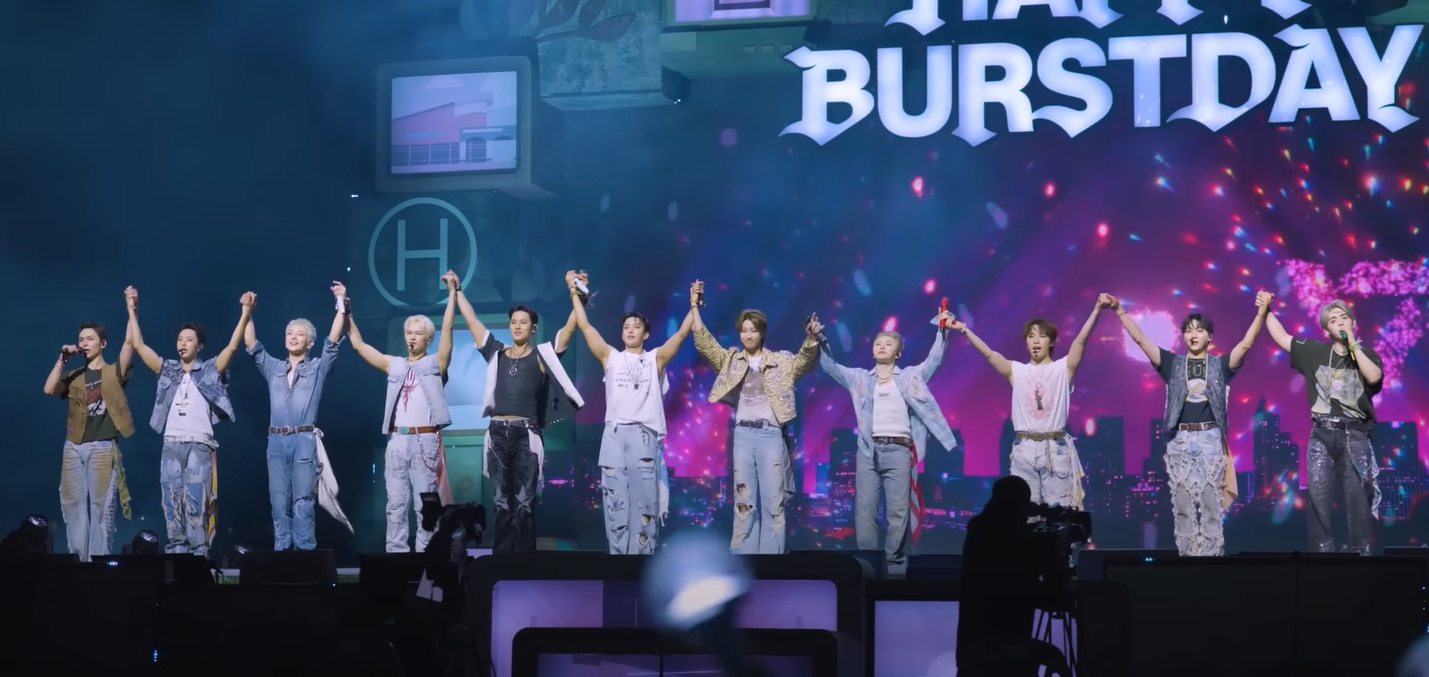
Seventeen released their fifth studio album, Happy Burstday, on May 26.

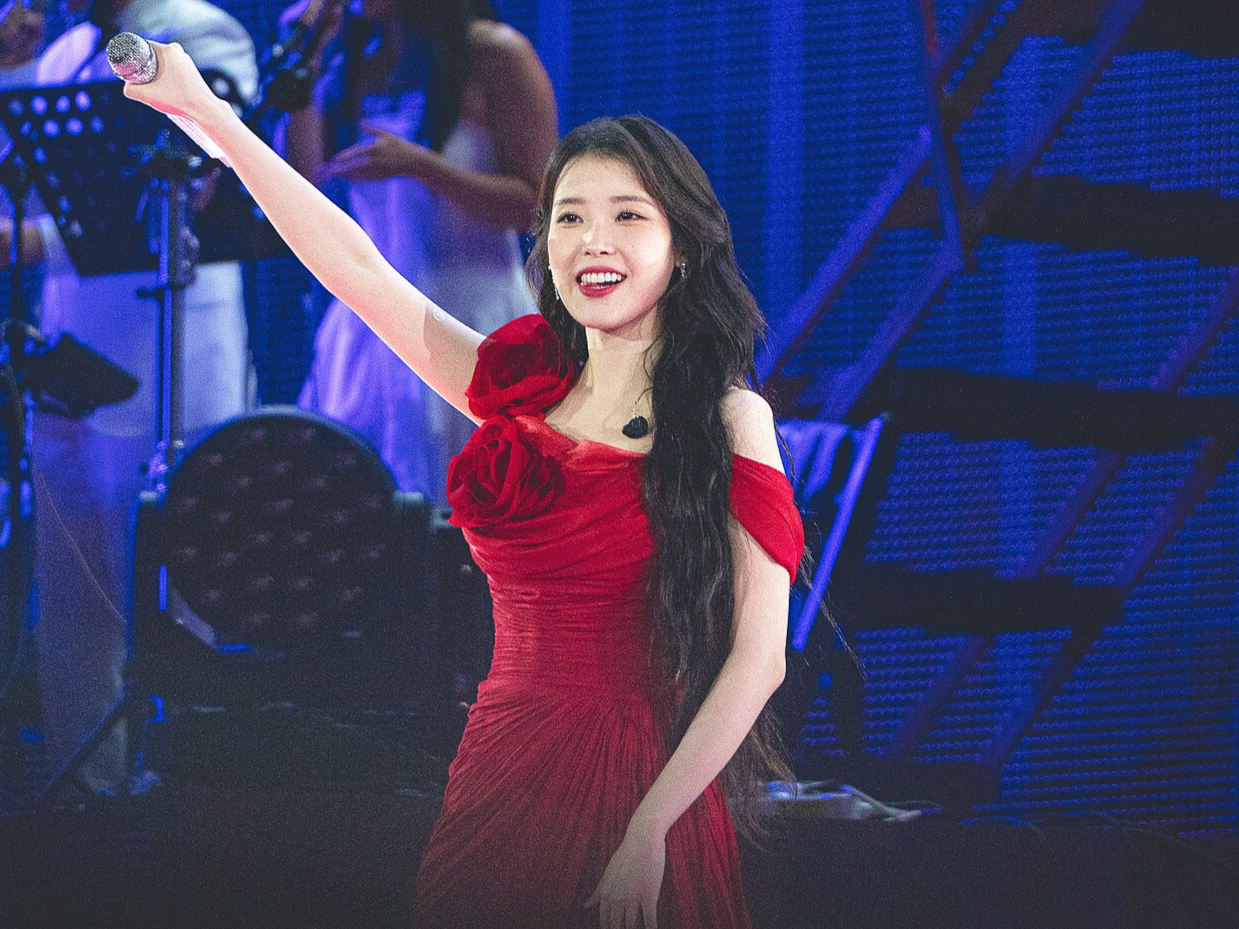
IU released her third covers EP, A Flower Bookmark 3, on May 27.

Date	Album	Artist(s)	Ref.
1	Chameleon	Trendz	
2	We Are I-dle	I-dle	
7	Versus	E'Last	
8	Duh!	P1Harmony	
9	Echo	Ablume	
12	Assemble25	TripleS	
12	My Eyes Open VVide	Meovv	
13	No Genre	BoyNextDoor	
15	Brut	Jeong Se-woon	
15	Panic	Beomgyu	
16	Echo	Jin	
16	JCFactory Vol.2	Jaechan	
17	Defend Myself	X:IN	
19	Always Some More	Smorz	
19	Beautiful in Chaos	Kim Jae-joong	
19	D.I.M.M.	VVS	
19	Essence of Reverie	Baekhyun	
19	Odyssey	Riize	
19	We Are	I-dle	
25	Poet Artist	SHINee	
26	Happy Burstday	Seventeen	
26	Kick Out, Flip Now!	KickFlip	
26	Tilt	Red Velvet – Irene & Seulgi	
27	A Flower Bookmark 3	IU	
28	Everlasting	N.Flying	
28	Playlist #You Are You	UAU	
30	Wished	XD	
30	Wrld	The Rose	

==== June ====
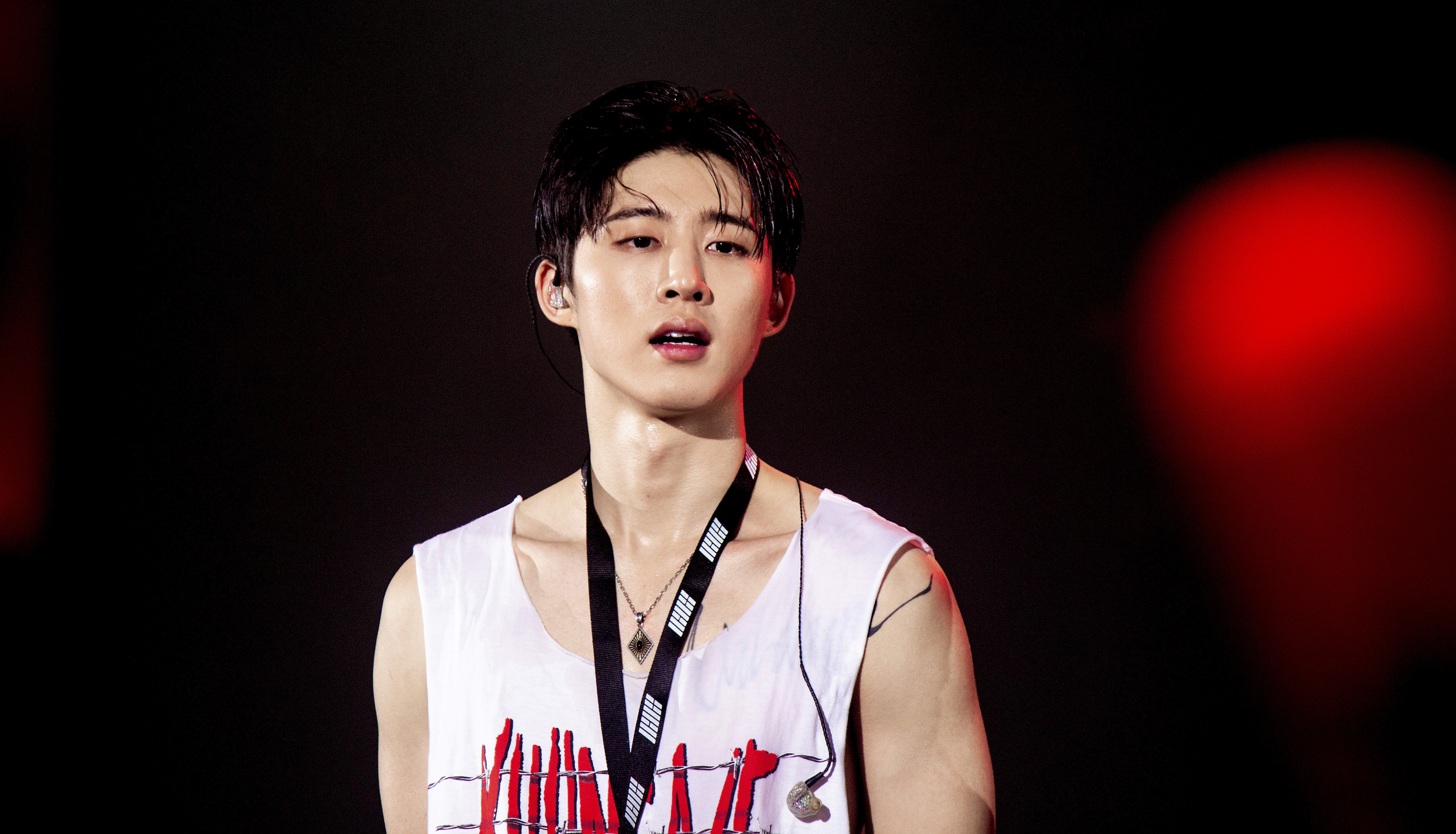
B.I released his third studio album, Wonderland, on June 1.

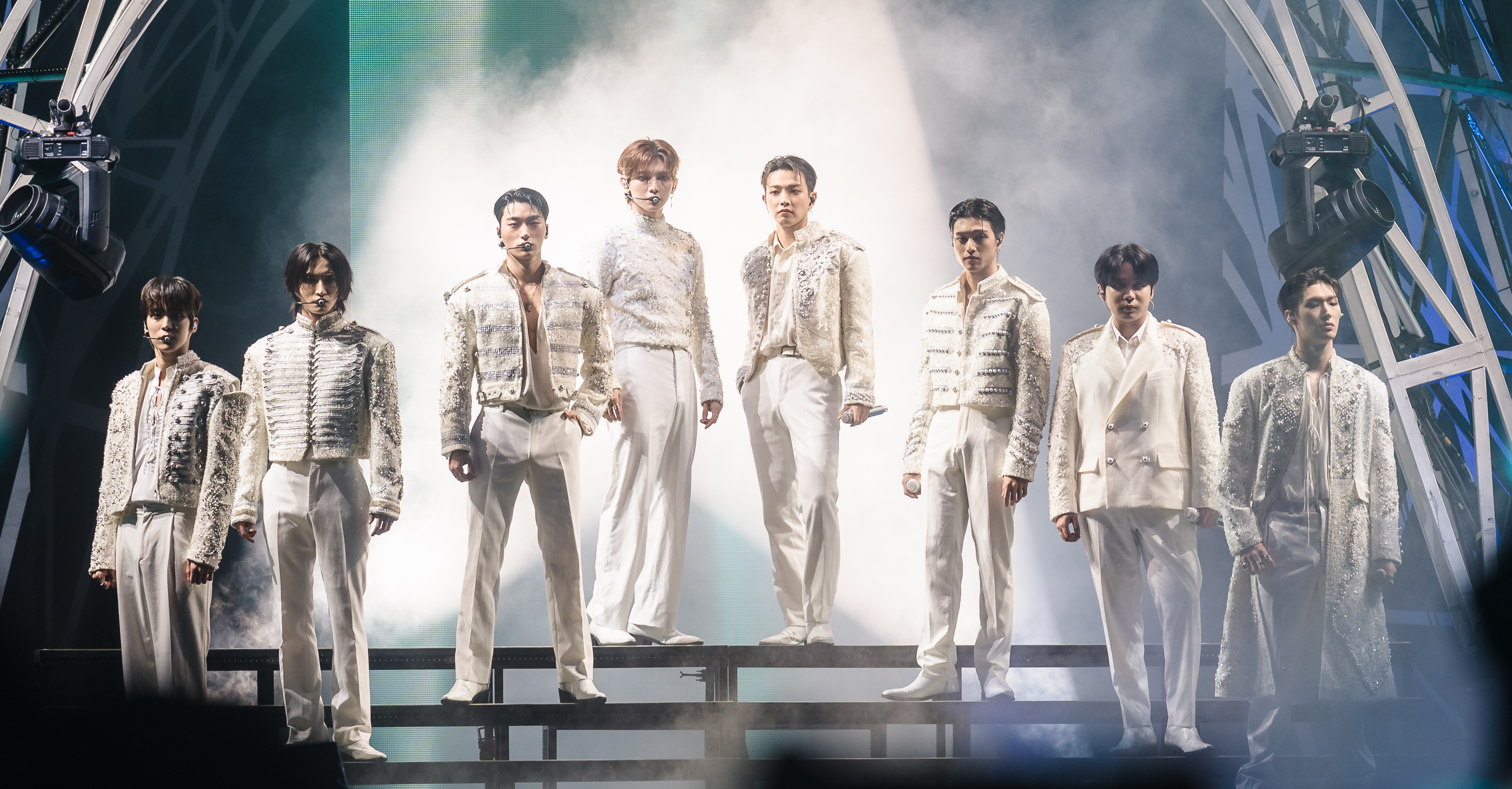
Ateez released their twelfth EP Golden Hour: Part.3 on June 13.

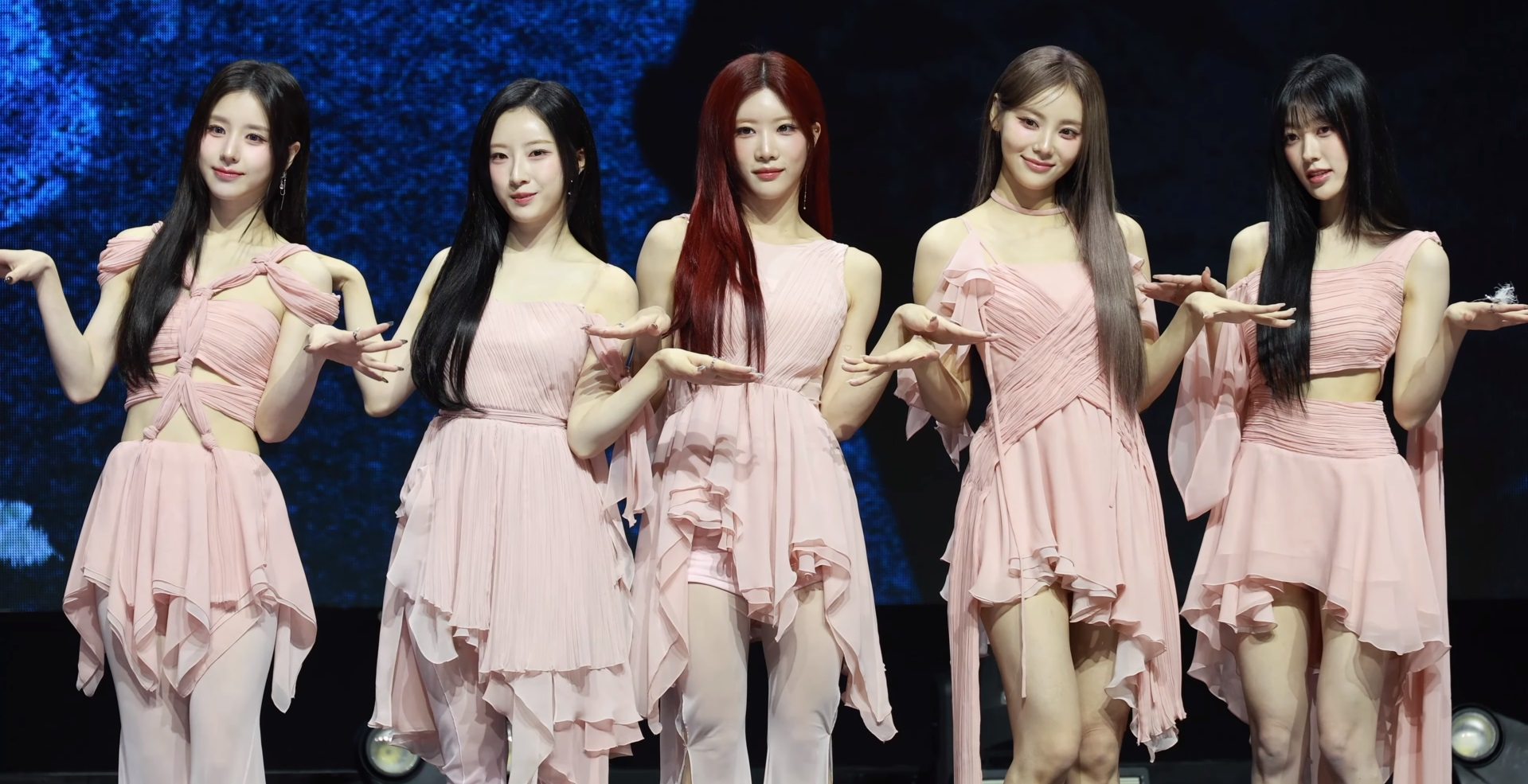
Artms released their first EP, Club Icarus, on June 13.

Date	Album	Artist(s)	Ref.
1	Wonderland	B.I	
4	Speed Zone	Uspeer	
5	Desire: Unleash	Enhypen	
9	224	Kiss of Life	
9	Beep	Izna	
9	Girls Will Be Girls	Itzy	
9	In a Million Noises, I'll Be Your Harmony	QWER	
9	Soar	Doyoung	
13	Club Icarus	Artms	
13	Golden Hour: Part.3	Ateez	
13	I One	Xlov	
13	Itty Bitty	N.SSign	
16	Bomb	Illit	
16	Glow to Haze	Kang Daniel	
18	Be:1	Be Boys	
19	All About Blue	Yook Sung-jae	
23	Dare to Crave	Cravity	
23	Famous	AllDay Project	
25	From Our 20's	Fromis 9	
26	Lovestruck	H1-Key	
27	Being Tender	Pow	
27	Dirty Work	Aespa	
30	5x	Oneus	
30	Kik	Kik	
30	N: Number of Cases	Nouera	
30	Top Note	Han Seung-woo	

=== Third quarter ===
==== July ====
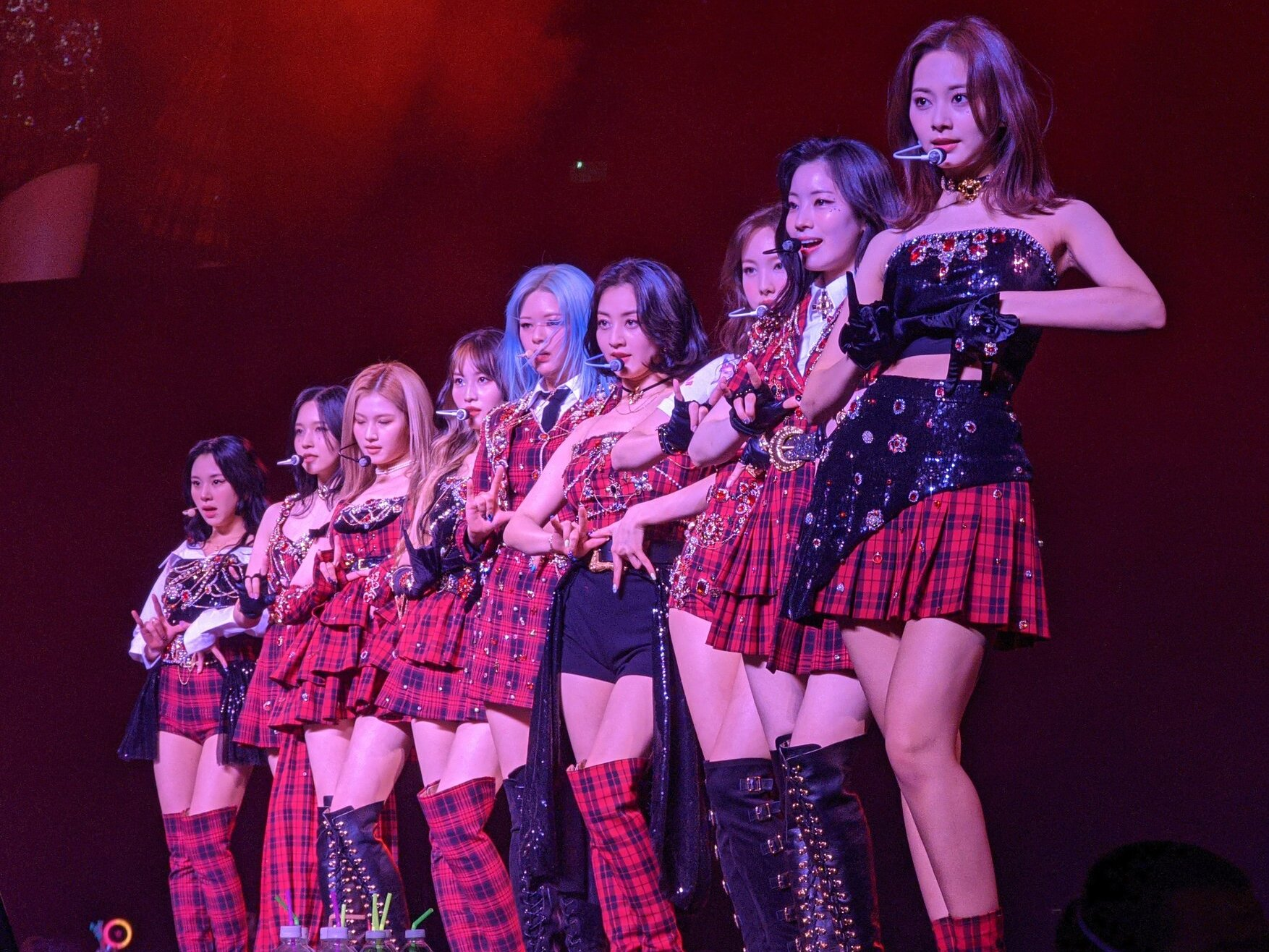
Twice released their fourth studio album, This Is For, on July 11.

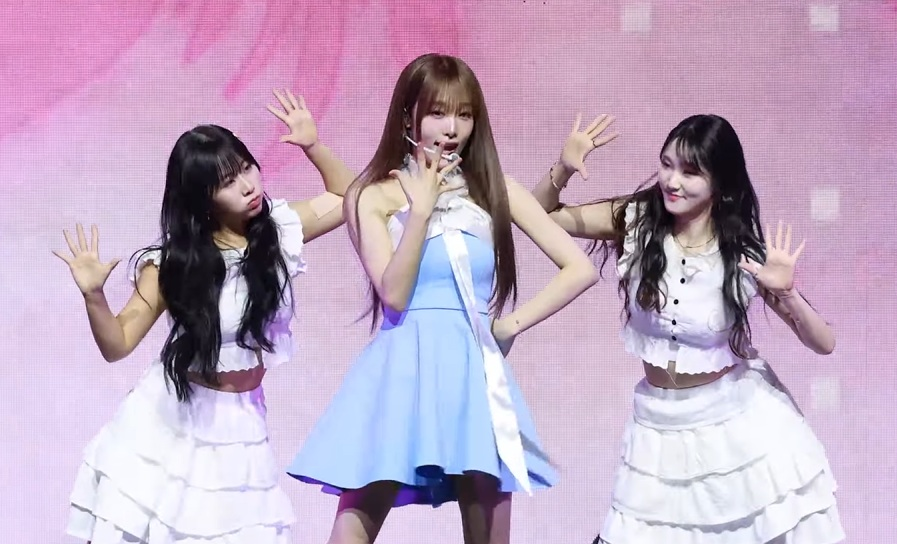
Choi Ye-na released her fourth EP, Blooming Wings, on July 29.

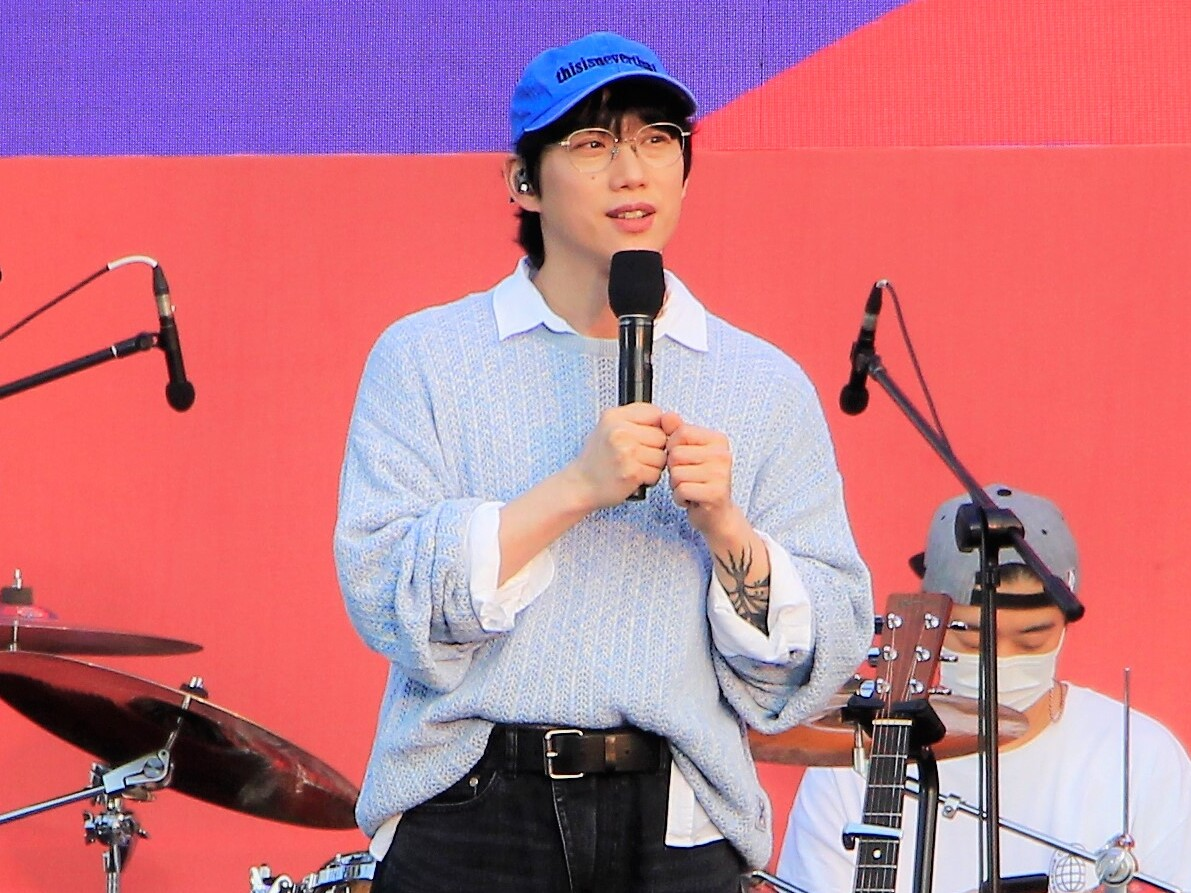
One-man band 10cm released their fifth studio album, 5.0, on July 30.

Date	Album	Artist(s)	Ref.
1	Who We Are	AHOF	
2	Dearest	Rescene	
2	Drift	Kard	
3	One Last Day	Jung Yong-hwa	
7	Bliss	Doh Kyung-soo	
8	A Montage of ( )	Viviz	
8	Super Junior25	Super Junior	
9	Ignition	Nowz	
9	Snowy Summer	Close Your Eyes	
11	This Is For	Twice	
14	Episode 25	Jo Yuri	
14	Eros	Lee Chan-hyuk	
14	Go Back to the Future	NCT Dream	
15	Chameleon	Yoon San-ha	
15	Percent	Onew	
15	Rainbow Light	Lim Seul-ong	
16	Hope	ARrC	
16	Sweet Tang	Ifeye	
18	Big Bands	WayV	
18	The 1st Verse	1Verse	
21	Hook	Huta	
21	The Star Chapter: Together	Tomorrow X Together	
22	One Fact	One Pact	
28	A;Effect	The Boyz	
28	Youth Chapter 3: Romantic Youth	Epex	
25	New Car	Ryu Su-jeong	
29	Blooming Wings	Choi Ye-na	
30	5.0	10cm	
30	Tree Ring	Nam Woo-hyun	
31	Waste No Time	XngHan	
31	Wild Cherry	Ichillin'	

==== August ====
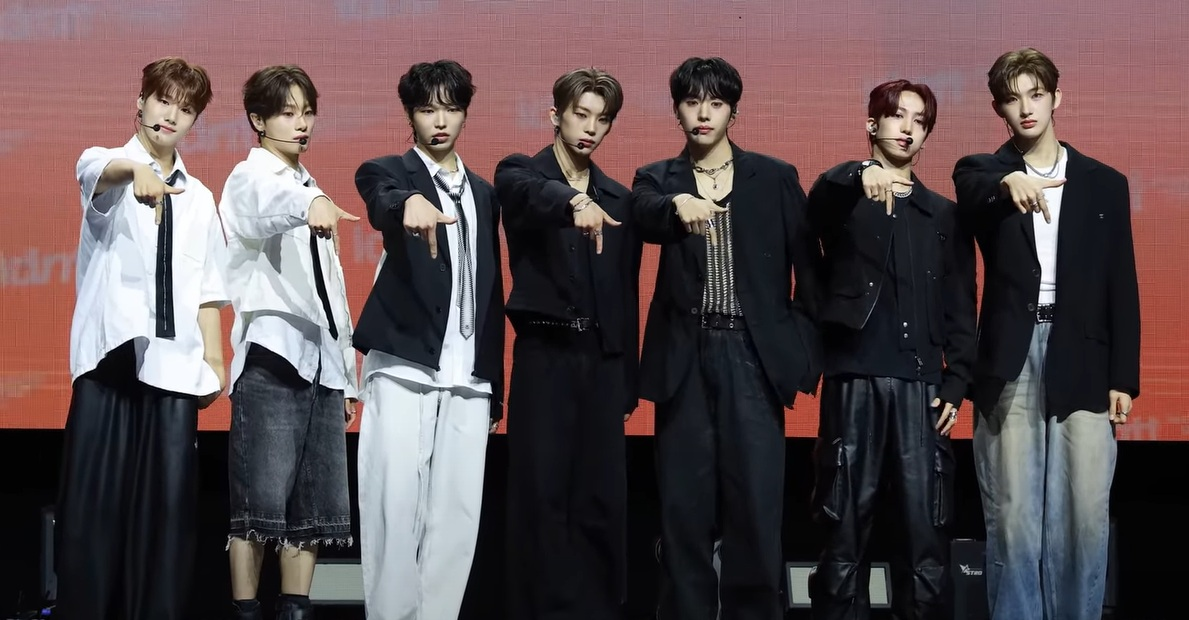
Unevermet released their self-titled first EP on August 11.

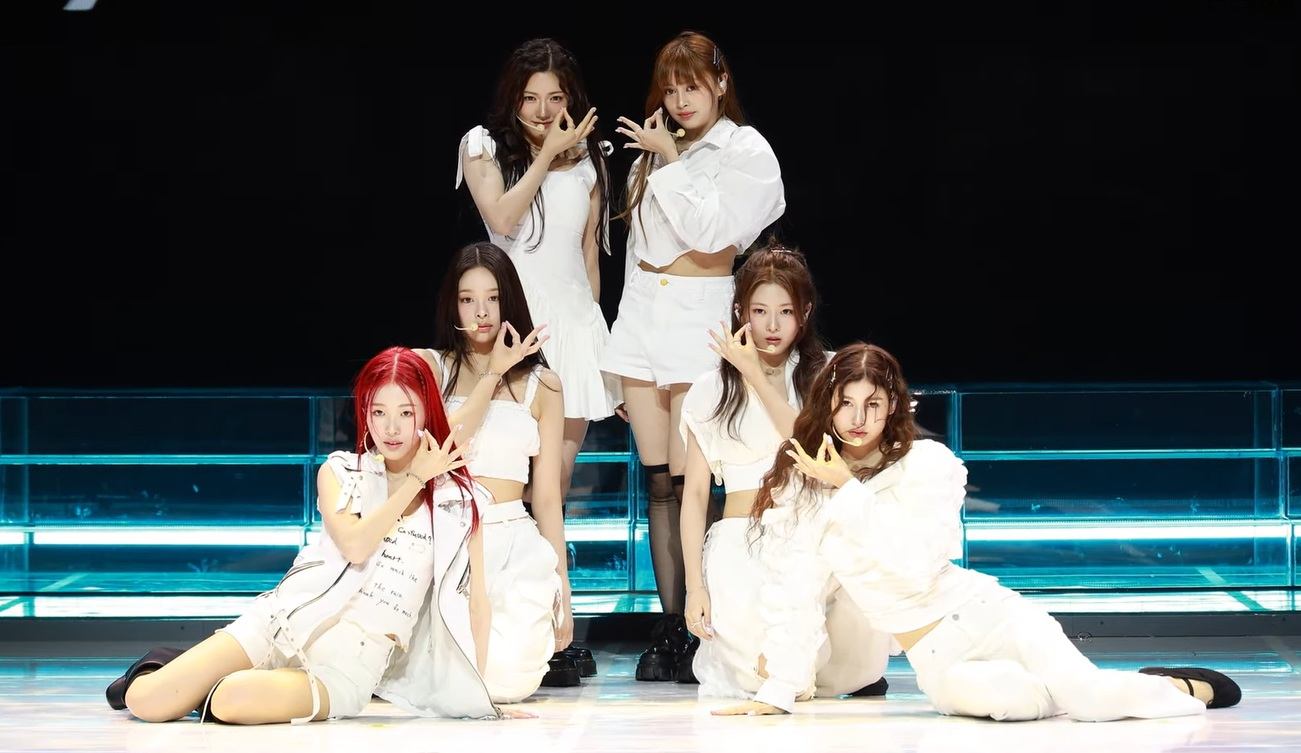
AtHeart released their first EP, Plot Twist, on August 13.

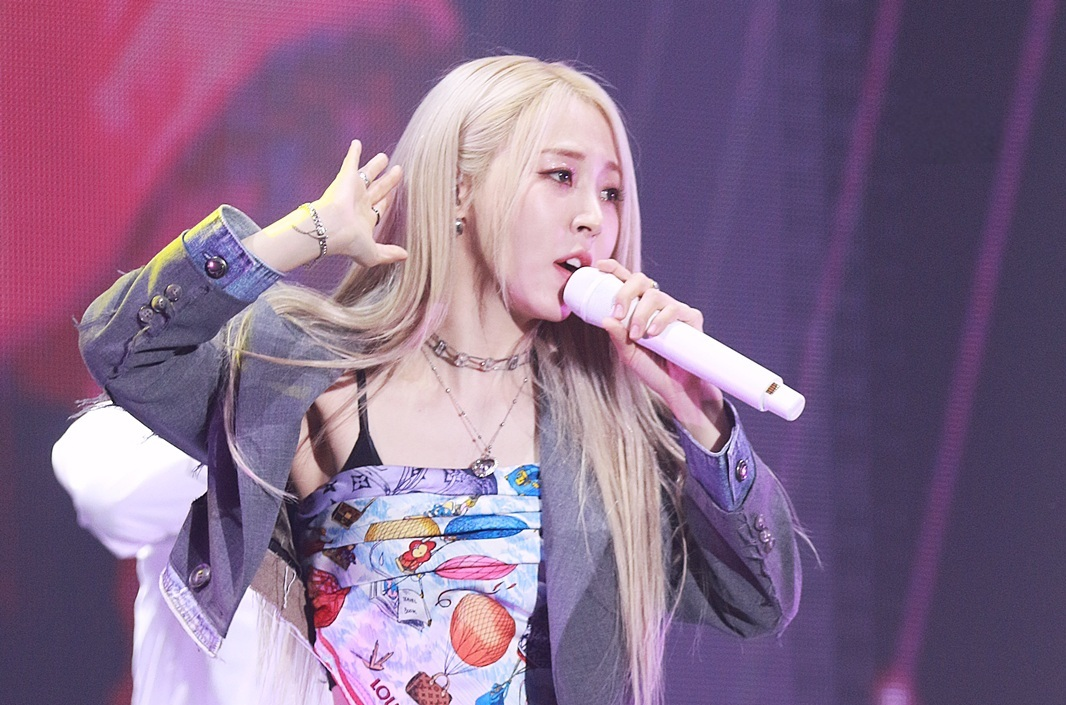
Moonbyul released her fourth EP, Laundri, on August 20.

Date	Album	Artist(s)	Ref.
1	ILY	Say My Name	
1	Pullup to Busan 4 More Hyper Summer It’s Gonna Be a Fuckin Movie	Effie	
4	Crazier	BoA	
4	Love Anecdote(s)	Evnne	
7	Prism Ep.01	Queenz Eye	
7	Soft Error	Yves	
11	Chaotic & Confused	Jeon Somi	
11	Hunter	Key	
11	Unevermet	Unevermet	
12	In Bloom	Yuju	
12	Loud & Proud	Ampers&One	
13	Dice	ZooniZini	
13	Plot Twist	AtHeart	
14	Growing Pain Pt.1: Free	Young Posse	
18	From Joy, with Love	Joy	
19	Bubble Gum	Kep1er	
20	Laundri	Moonbyul	
21	Just 15, Just Teen Top	Teen Top	
22	Karma	Stray Kids	
25	Ive Secret	Ive	
25	Upside Down	AB6IX	
25	Upside Down	Chanyeol	
26	Renewed Purpose	Lee Seok-hoon	
27	Baditude	Soojin	
27	Hide & Find	Ixia	
29	Im Hero 2	Lim Young-woong	

==== September ====
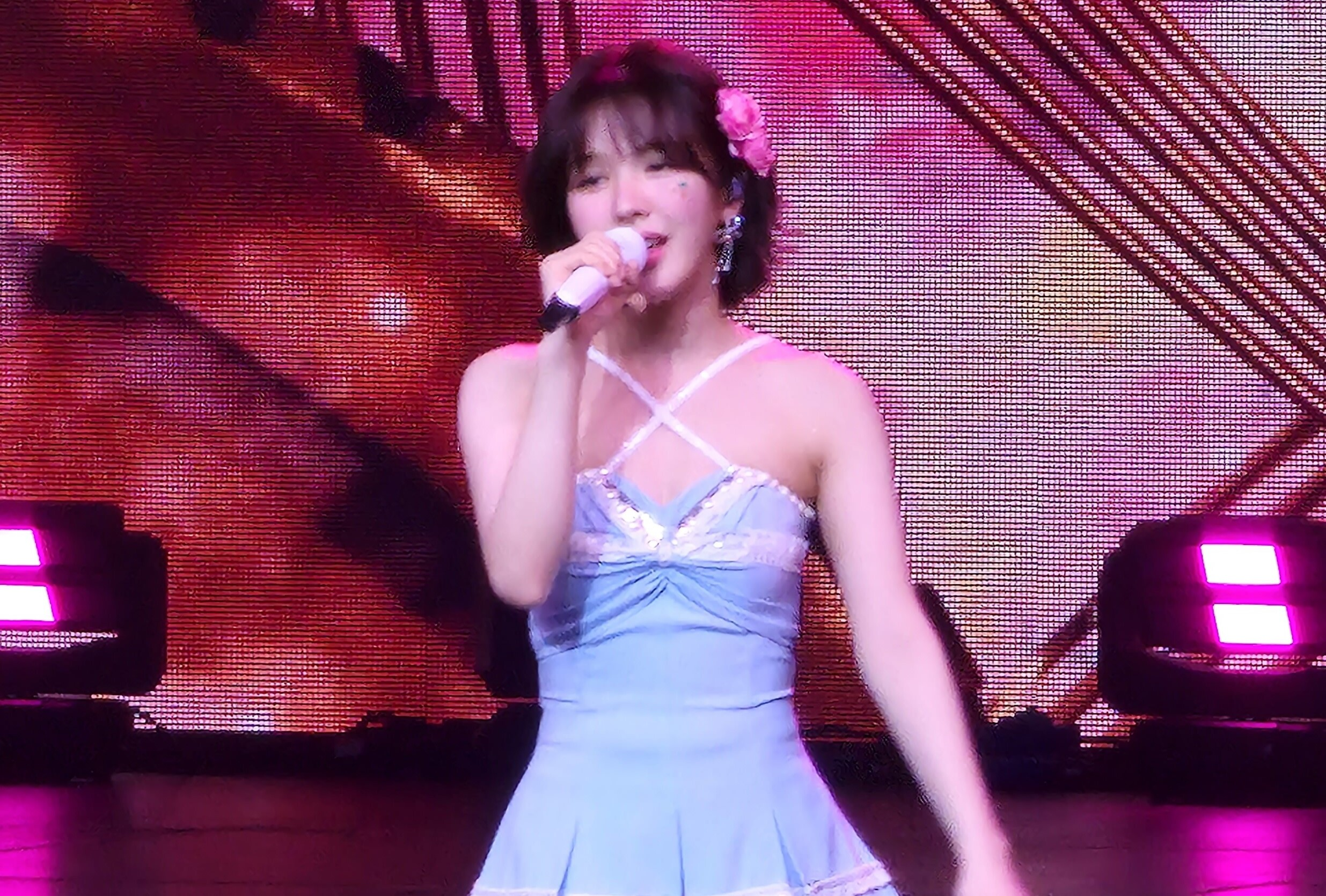
Wendy released her third EP, Cerulean Verge, on September 10

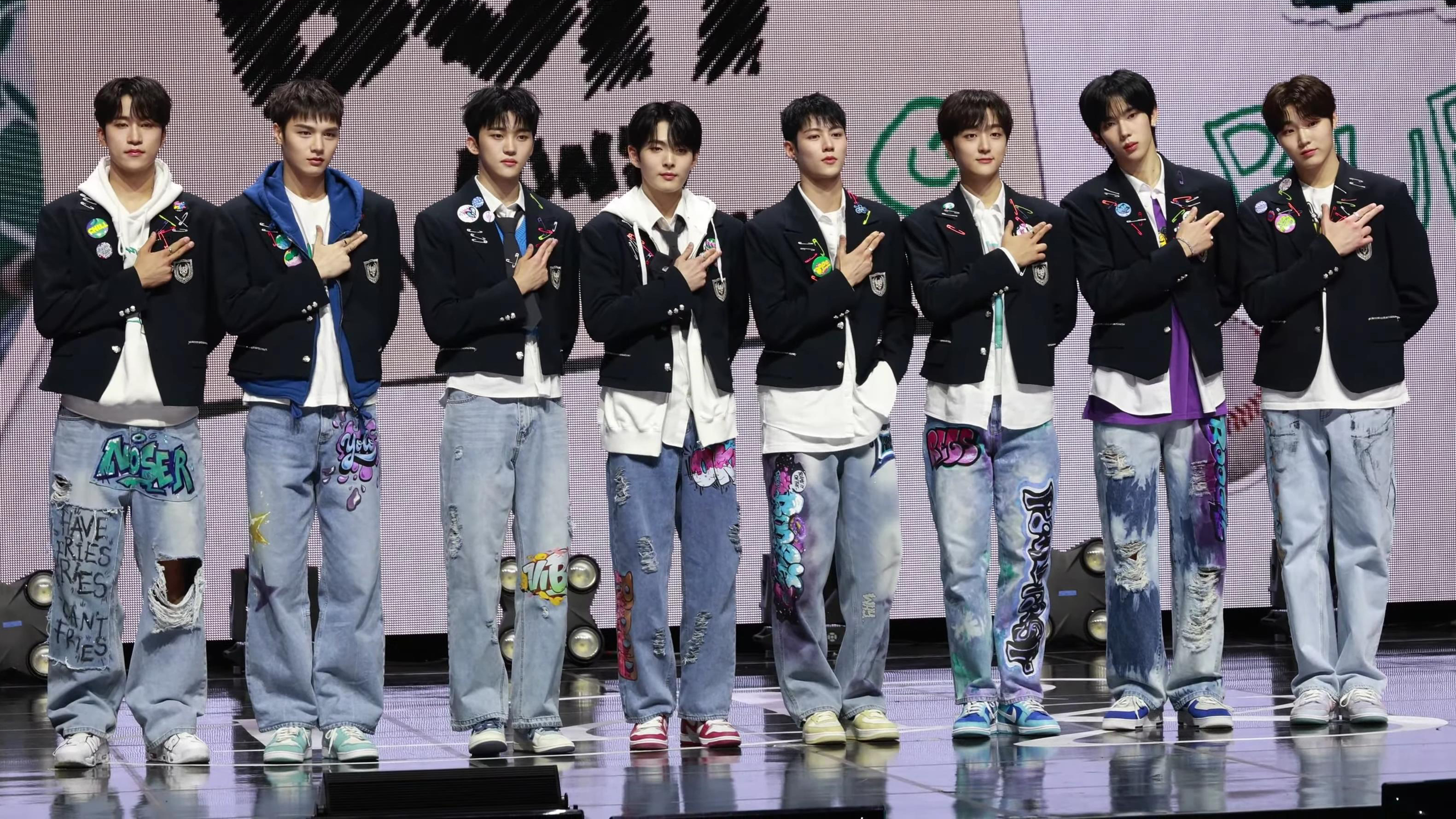
Lun8 released their second single album, Lost, on September 17.

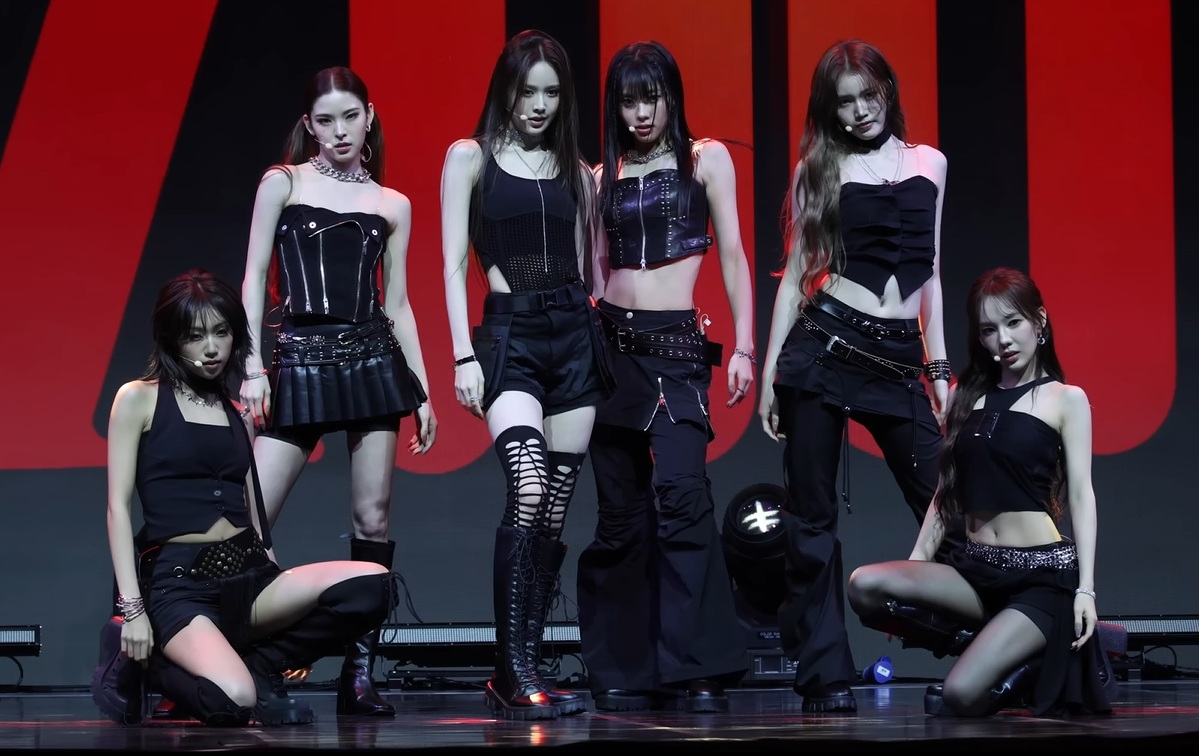
Izna released their second EP, Not Just Pretty, on September 30.

Date	Album	Artist(s)	Ref.
1	Color	NCT Wish	
1	Dear My Muse	Jun. K	
1	Love Pulse	Treasure	
1	Never Say Never	Zerobaseone	
1	The X	Monsta X	
2	Haengno	Jung Dae-hyun	
5	Rich Man	Aespa	
5	The Decade	Day6	
8	Color Outside the Lines	Cortis	
8	Go Chapter 1: Go Together	CIX	
8	Taste	Haechan	
9	VCF	All(H)Ours	
10	AxMxP	AxMxP	
10	Cerulean Verge	Wendy	
12	Lil Fantasy Vol. 1	Chaeyoung	
14	Seventh Heaven 16	Nana	
15	I Did It	Idid	
15	I'm Into	Jang Wooyoung	
15	Thriller	Badvillain	
16	Motivation	Yuqi	
17	Lost	Lun8	
18	Heestory	Kim Hee-jae	
22	Last Dance	Lee Jun-young	
22	My First Flip	KickFlip	
22	Who Are You	Suho	
23	The KingDom: The Flower of the Moon	The KingDom	
29	Arcadia	Chen	
29	Hype Vibes	S.Coups X Mingyu	
29	Wall Flower	Pow	
30	Not Just Pretty	Izna	

=== Fourth quarter ===
==== October ====
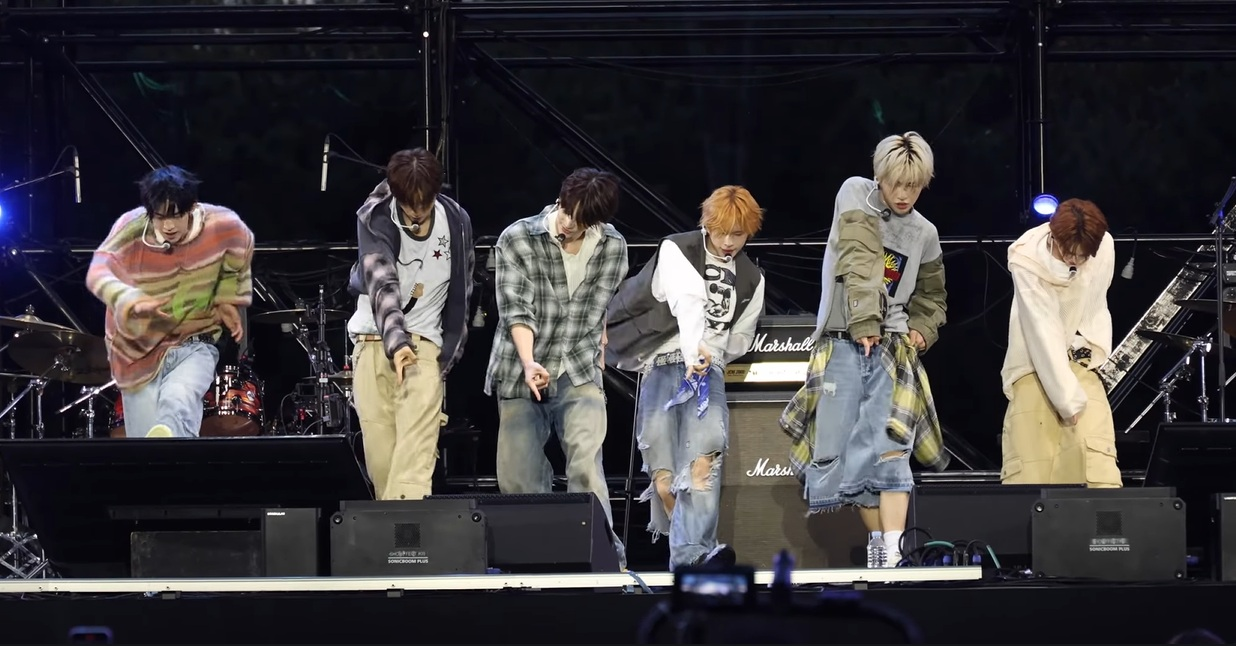
TWS released their fourth EP, Play Hard, on October 13.

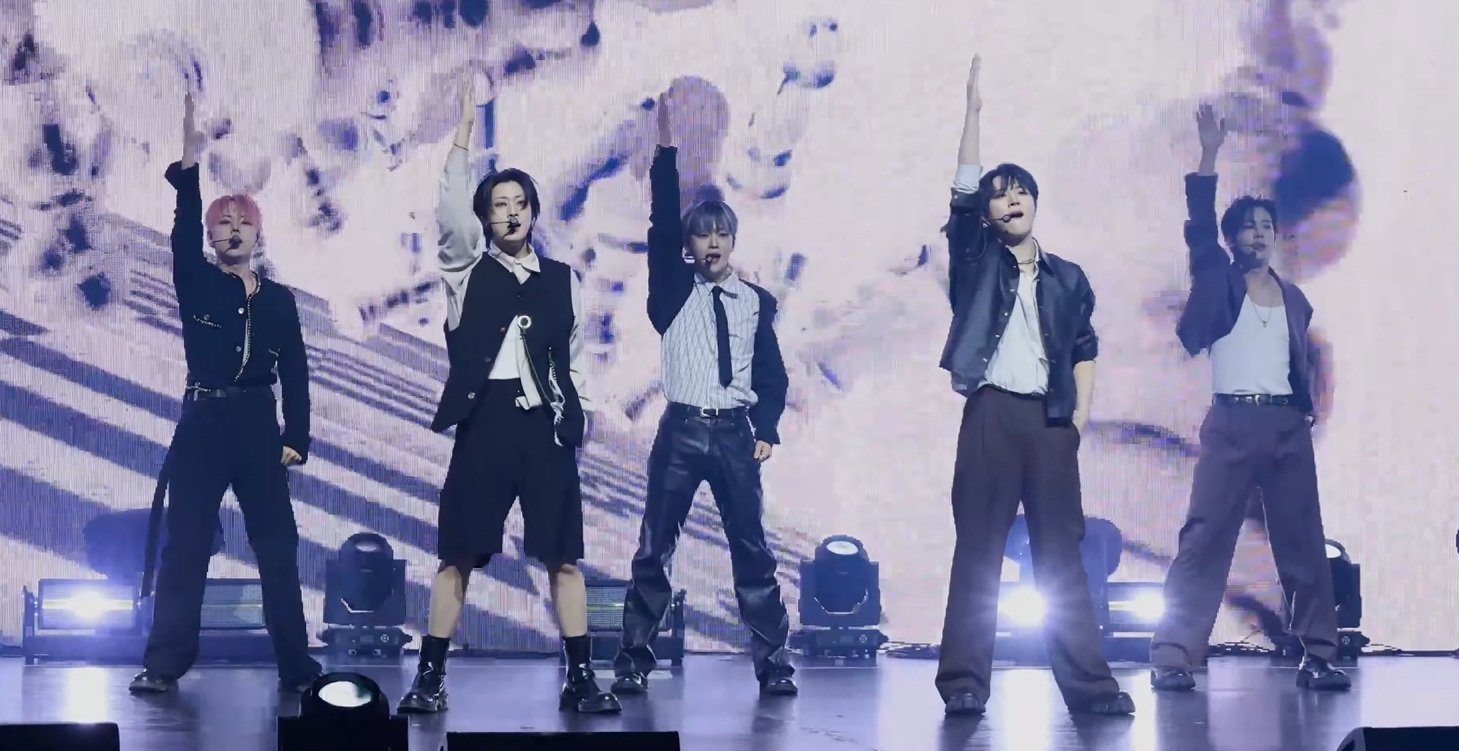
WEi released their eighth EP, Wonderland, on October 29.

Date	Album	Artist(s)	Ref.
6	Things We Love: I	Hitgs	
7	Maze: Ad Astra	Onewe	
10	Ten: The Story Goes On	Twice	
10	We Go Up	Babymonster	
13	Blue Valentine	Nmixx	
13	Everybody's Guilty, but No One's to Blame	Kino	
13	Play Hard	TWS	
14	Analog Vol.1	Jang Minho	
14	Still Young	Bae Jin-young	
20	Brilliant	Lee Chan-won	
20	Focus	Hearts2Hearts	
20	Po:int	BM	
20	The Action	BoyNextDoor	
21	Sound of Music Pt. 2: Life	Jannabi	
22	Endand	Lee Chang-sub	
23	Emotion	DKB	
23	New Chapter: Desear	BAE173	
24	Lxve to Death	Xdinary Heroes	
24	Spaghetti	Le Sserafim	
27	As I Am	Tempest	
27	Beat-Boxer	Nexz	
28	Back to Life	&Team	
29	Wonderland	WEi	
30	Called Love	Jung Seung-hwan	
30	Sunflower	Lucy	
30	Trophy	82Major	
31	House of Tricky: Wrecking the House	Xikers	
31	Syndrome	Wonho	
31	Tasty	DKZ	

==== November ====
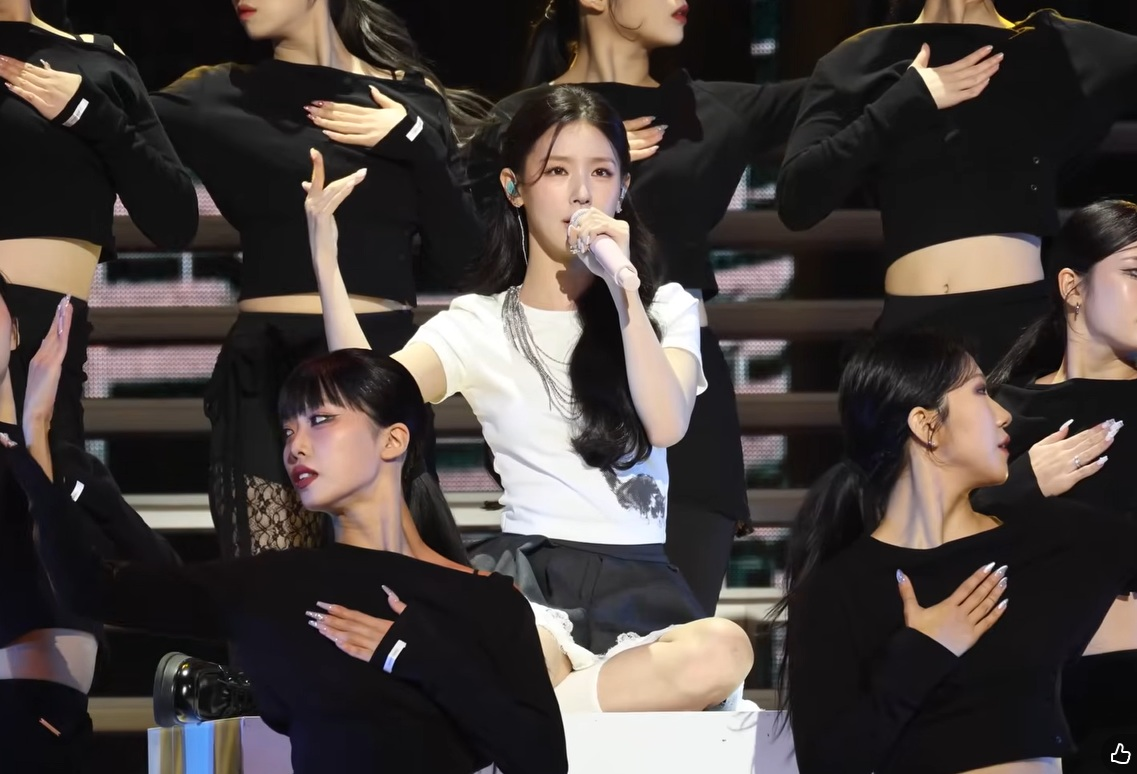
Miyeon released her second EP, My, Lover, on November 3.

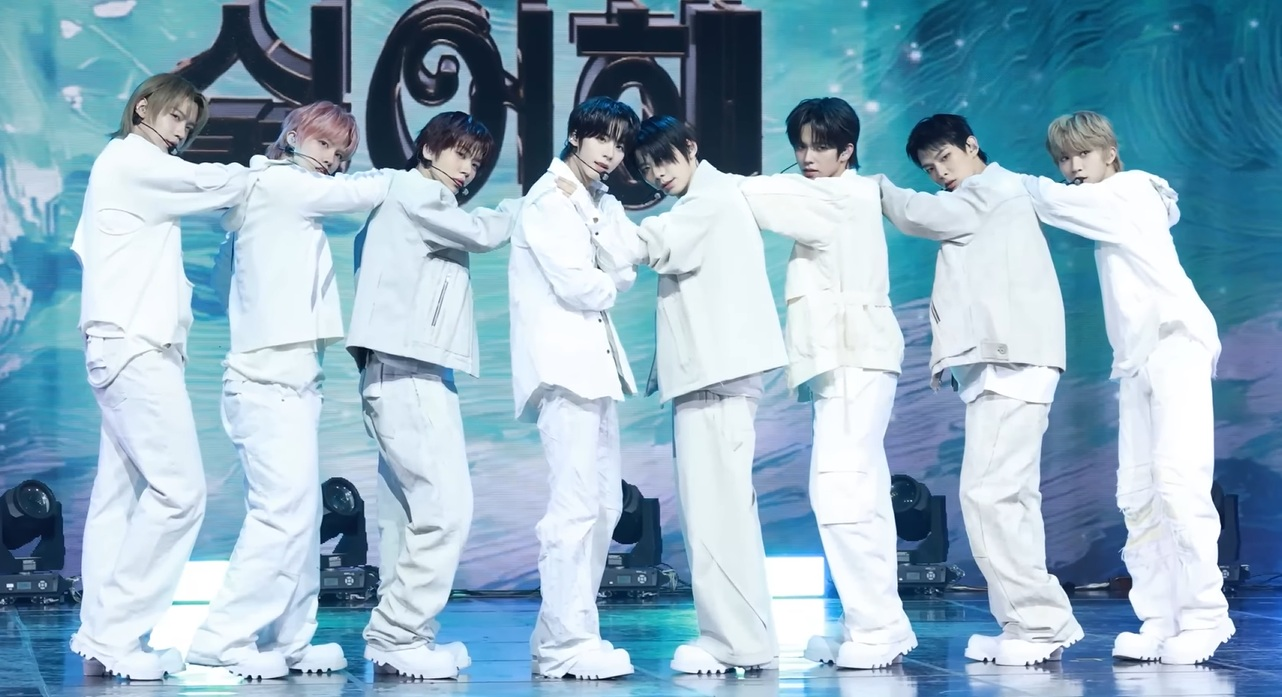
AHOF released their second EP, The Passage, on November 4.

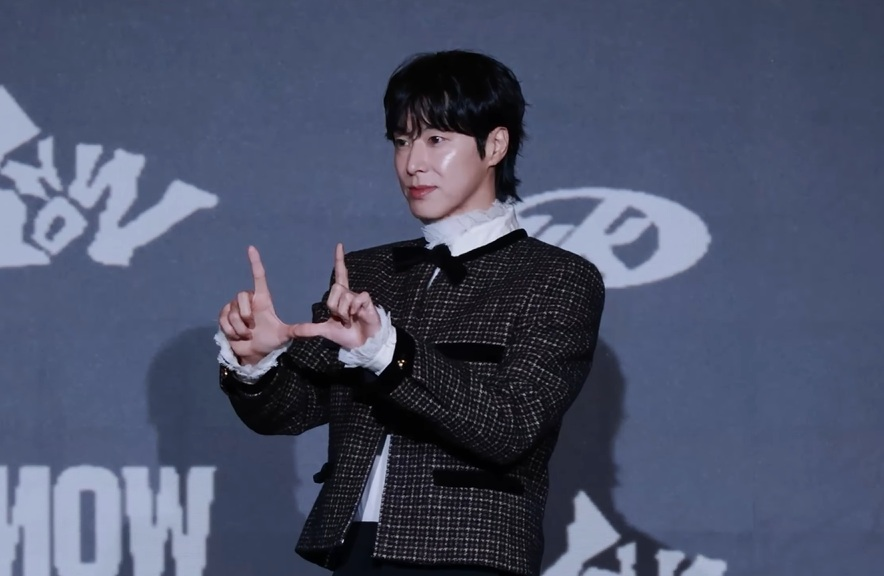
U-Know Yunho released his first album, I-Know, on November 5.

Date	Album	Artist(s)	Ref.
3	Page 2	Kang Seung-yoon	
3	Stay	Urban Zakapa	
3	My, Lover	Miyeon	
4	Too Much Part 1	Fifty Fifty	
4	The Passage	AHOF	
5	I-Know	U-Know Yunho	
5	Heart Maid	Sunmi	
6	Louder Than Ever	Newbeat	
6	Proto Type	NTX	
7	No Labels: Part 01	Yeonjun	
10	Lukoie	Am8ic	
10	Tunnel Vision	Itzy	
10	Unbroken	ONF	
10	Dare to Crave: Epilogue	Cravity	
11	Blackout	Close Your Eyes	
12	P.M.S (Pretty Mood Swings)	Jessi	
17	Beat It Up	NCT Dream	
18	Awake	Jang Dong-woo	
20	The Classic	Kyuhyun	
20	VVON	VVUP	
21	Do It	Stray Kids	
21	Else	Cha Eun-woo	
22	Room	Jeong Ye-in	
24	Beyond Beauty	TripleS	
24	Fame	Riize	
24	Not Cute Anymore	Illit	
25	Lip Bomb	Rescene	
27	Love Virus Pt.1	Heize	

==== December ====
Date	Album	Artist(s)	Ref.
1	Lost and Found	Verivery	
1	Panorama: The Best of Taeyeon	Taeyeon	
3	Sweet Dream	Chuei Liyu	
4	Unfold	Seo Eun-kwang	
5	The Reason	Yim Si-wan	
8	AllDay Project	AllDay Project	
8	Eternal White	WayV	
15	Tempo	Minho	
29	&Our Vibe	Say My Name	

== Top songs on record ==
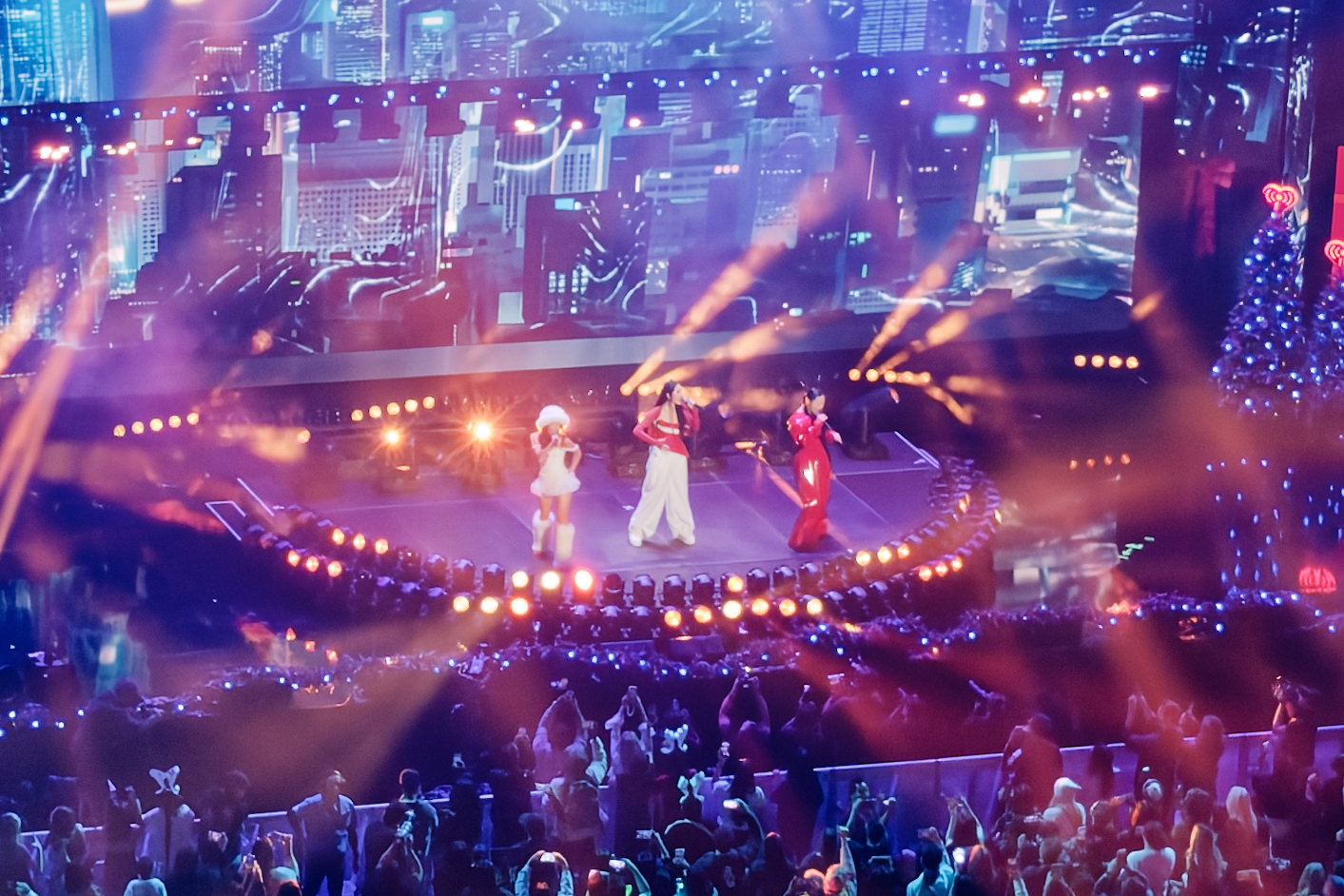
"Golden" by Huntrix (performers Rei Ami, Ejae and Audrey Nuna pictured) topped the Circle Digital Chart for 15 weeks in 2025.

=== Circle Digital Chart No. 1 Songs ===
- "Apt." – Rosé and Bruno Mars (9 weeks in 2024, 1 week in 2025)
- "Blue Valentine" – Nmixx (4 weeks)
- "Drowning" – Woodz (1 week)
- "Famous" – AllDay Project (2 weeks)
- "Golden" – Huntrix (15 weeks)
- "Good Goodbye" – Hwasa (2 weeks)
- "Heavenly Ever After" – Lim Young-woong (1 week)
- "Home Sweet Home" – G-Dragon featuring Taeyang and Daesung (1 week in 2024, 5 weeks in 2025)
- "Like Jennie" – Jennie (2 weeks)
- "Rebel Heart" – Ive (2 weeks)
- "Thunder" – Seventeen (1 week)
- "To Reach You" – 10cm (6 weeks)
- "Too Bad" – G-Dragon featuring Anderson .Paak (7 weeks)

== Deaths ==
- Song Dae-kwan, trot singer
- Wheesung, R&B singer, record producer and musical theatre actor
- Lee Min, singer and member of R&B band As One
