= Raw and Rad =

- Digital cover

Studio album by Newbeat
- Released: March 24, 2025
- Length: 25:45
- Label: Beat Interactive

Newbeat chronology
Raw and Rad (2025)	Louder Than Ever (2025)

Singles from Raw and Rad
- 1. "Jello" Released: March 5, 2025; 2. "Hiccups" Released: March 12, 2025; 3. "Flip the Coin" Released: March 24, 2025

Raw and Rad is the debut studio album by South Korean boy band Newbeat. The album was released on March 24, 2025, by Beat Interactive. It is available in four versions and contains ten tracks (Note: Eleven tracks in the CD version.) with "Flip the Coin" as its lead single.

== Background and release ==
On February 12, 2025, Beat Interactive announced that Newbeat would debut in the first half of the year. Shortly after, Newbeat confirmed that their debut was set for March 24. On February 18, Beat Interactive revealed that the group would release a pre-release single, "Jello", on March 5, followed by their debut studio album, Raw and Rad, also on March 24. The second pre-release single, "Hiccups", was released on March 12, while the lead single, "Flip the Coin", was released on the same day of the band's debut.

== Track listing ==
Raw and Rad track listing
No.	Title	Length
1.	"Intro: Raw and Rad" (featuring Khundi Panda)	3:08
2.	"Sounds Like Money"	2:54
3.	"Jello" (힘숨찐)	2:43
4.	"Hiccups"	2:59
5.	"You,Me +,-" (너,나 +,-)	1:33
6.	"Flip The Coin"	2:53
7.	"F.L.Y (Fu**ing Lovely, Lonely Youth)"	3:44
8.	"Wonder"	3:13
9.	"We Are Young"	3:09
10.	"Outro: Zero-Sum Game"	1:49
Total length:		25:45

CD only
No.	Title	Length
11.	"Highs&Lows (Hi&Love)"

== Charts ==
Chart performance for Raw and Rad
Chart (2025)	Peak position
South Korean Albums (Circle)	20

== Release history ==
Release history for Raw and Rad
Region	Date	Format	Label
South Korea	March 24, 2025	CD; digital download; streaming	Beat Interactive
Various	March 24, 2025	Digital download; streaming	Beat Interactive
