= Newbeat =

South Korean boy band

- Also known as: Hinlove
- Origin: Seoul, South Korea
- Genres: K-pop; dance-pop
- Years active: 2025–present
- Label: Beat Interactive
- Members: Park Min-seok; Hong Min-sung; Jeon Yeo-yeo-jeong; Choi Seo-hyun; Kim Tae-yang; Jo Yun-hu; Kim Ri-woo
- Website: newbeat.kr

Newbeat (Korean: 뉴비트; stylized in all caps; abbreviated as NBT) is South Korean boy band formed and managed by Beat Interactive. The group consists of seven members: Park Min-seok, Hong Min-sung, Jeon Yeo-yeo-jung, Choi Seo-hyun, Kim Tae-yang, Jo Yun-hu, and Kim Ri-woo. Newbeat debuted in March 2025 with their first studio album Raw and Rad.

== History ==
=== Pre-debut and formation ===
On December 20, 2022, Beat Interactive opened an Instagram account for its pre-debut boy group. Park Min-seok, Hong Min-hyung, Jeon Yeo-yeo-jeong, Choi Seo-hyun, Kim Tae-yang, Jo Yoon-hoo, and Kim Ri-woo all served as dancers in A.C.E's music video for "My Girl", with former TO1 member Jeon Yeo-jung also joining the cast. On June 20, 2024, the group returned under the name Hinlove as dancers for A.C.E's Rewind Us tour in the United States, with the addition of new member Kim Ri-woo to the lineup. The group's social media accounts used the name Hinlove, but most have since been changed to Newbeat. From July 21 to August 11, 2024, the group went on a street tour called High & Low Donuts, performing on the streets with different dance crews. The group also served as dancers for A.C.E during KCON LA.

=== 2025–present: Raw and Rad and Louder than Ever ===
On February 12, 2025, Beat Interactive announced that Newbeat would debut in the first half of the year. Shortly after, Newbeat confirmed that their debut was set for March 24. On February 18, Beat Interactive revealed that the group would release a pre-release single, "Jello", on March 5, followed by their debut studio album, Raw and Rad, also on March 24. The second pre-release single, "Hiccups", was released on March 12, while the lead single, "Flip the Coin", was released on the same day of the band's debut.

On July 23, Newbeat released a new digital single, "Cappuccino," as a gift to their fans; on August 5, they also revealed plans to release a new album later this year. On October 13, NEWBEAT announced that their first EP would be released on November 6. On October 16, the EP's title was officially announced as Louder Than Ever.

== Members ==
- Park Min-seok (박민석)
- Hong Min-sung (홍민성)
- Jeon Yeo-yeo-jeong (전여여정)
- Choi Seo-hyun (최서현)
- Kim Tae-yang (김태양)
- Jo Yun-hu (조윤후)
- Kim Ri-woo (김리우)

== Discography ==
=== Studio albums ===
List of studio albums, showing selected details, selected chart positions, and sales figures
Title	Details	Peak chart positions	Sales
Title	Details	KOR	Sales
Raw and Rad	Released: March 24, 2025; Label: Beat Interactive; Formats: CD, digital download, streaming	20	KOR: 23,470

=== Extended plays ===
List of extended plays, showing selected details, selected chart positions, and sales figures
Title	Details	Peak chart positions	Sales
Title	Details	KOR	Sales
Louder Than Ever	Released: November 6, 2025; Label: Beat Interactive; Formats: CD, digital download, streaming	13	KOR: 32,883

=== Singles ===
==== As lead artist ====
Title	Year	Peak chart positions	Album
Title	Year	KOR Down.	Album
"Jello"	2025	—	Raw and Rad
"Hiccups"	2025	—	Raw and Rad
"Flip the Coin"	2025	128	Raw and Rad
"Look So Good"	2025	—	Louder Than Ever
