= VVS (group) =

South Korean girl group

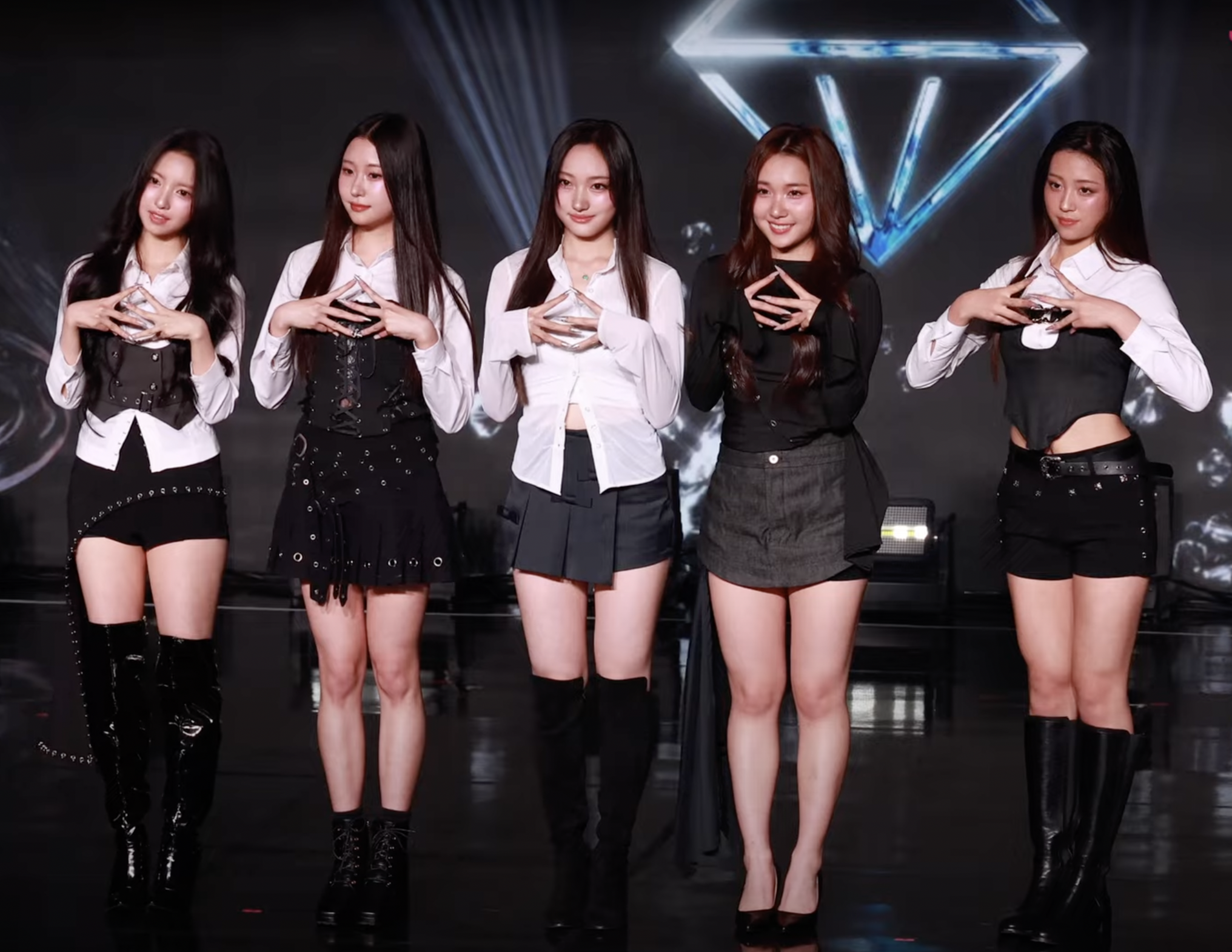
- VVS at their debut showcase in April 2025

Background information
- Origin: Seoul, South Korea
- Genre: K-pop
- Years active: 2025–2026
- Label: MZMC Inc.
- Past members: Brittney; Rana; Liwon; Lena; Jiu; Ilee
- Website: Official website

VVS (Korean: 븨븨에스) was a South Korean girl group formed by MZMC Inc. The group was composed of four members: Brittney, Rana, Liwon, and Lena. The group debuted in 2025 with their single album Tea. The group would later annouce their disbandment in October 2026 due to financial issues.

== Name ==
VVS's name is mainly a reference to the highest grade of diamond clarity according to the modern GIA diamond grading system. The name also stands for "5 vs.", with V being roman numeral 5, meaning to go against, as the girls see themselves as more powerful together as one group.

== History ==
=== 2024–present: Introduction, debut with Tea, D.I.M.M ===
In April 2024, Billboard released an article and interview announcing that new girl group VVS, piloted by Paul Thompson, would be debuting in October 2024. In January 2025, CNN released a trailer and then subsequent documentary on VVS as an episode of 'K-pop: A Star is Made', with a debut scheduled for early 2025. In March 2025, Thompson appeared on a segment of Arirang News and announced that VVS would be debuting in April 2025. On April 6, a teaser video was uploaded that confirmed the group's soon debut and official member lineup.

VVS's pre-debut single album "Tea", consisting of tracks "Tea" and "Fact$" was released on April 22, 2025. A follow-up pre-debut single "Purrfect" was then released on May 9. The group released their debut extended play "D.I.M.M." on May 19, including 5 new tracks, the 3 singles, and lead single "D.I.M.M.".

On April 27, 2026, it was announced through an interview that Jiu had left the group. On June 20, it was revealed on the group's podcast Ilee had left the group. The group disbanded on October 10 due to financial issues.

== Members ==
- Brittney (브리트니) – leader
- Rana (라나) – dancer
- Liwon (리원) – vocalist, rapper
- Lena (레나) – vocal

== Discography ==
=== Extended plays ===
List of extended plays, showing selected details, selected chart positions, and sales figures
Title	Details
D.I.M.M	Released: May 19, 2025; Label: MZMC Inc.; Formats: CD, digital download, streaming; Track listing: 1. "Free (Intro)"; 2. "Tea"; 3. "Fact$"; 4. "Purrfect"; 5. "New Phone (Interlude)"; 6. "D.I.M.M."; 7. "Touch It"; 8. "Shine (Outro)"
Stay the Night	Released: April 22, 2026; Label: MZMC Inc.; Formats: CD, digital download, streaming; Track Listing: 1. "V.V.$" - 2:49; 2. "A$k" - 2:28; 3. "Count It Up" - 2:05; 4. "Da$h" - 3:11; 5. "Bottle$" - 2:47; 6. "Mixin' Thang$" - 2:55; 7. "Vamo$" - 3:12; 8. "$tay The Night" - 3:07

=== Single albums ===
List of albums, showing selected details
Title	Details
Tea	Released: April 22, 2025; Label: MZMC Inc.; Formats: Digital download, streaming

=== Singles ===
List of singles, showing year released, selected chart positions, and name of the album
Title	Year	Album
"Tea"	2025	D.I.M.M.
"Purrfect"	2025	D.I.M.M.

== Videography ==
=== Music videos ===
List of songs, showing year released, name of the directors, and the length of the music videos
Title	Year	Director(s)	Length	Ref.
"Tea"	2025	HOBIN	4:09	
"Purrfect"	2025	HOBIN	3:07	
"D.I.M.M."	2025	NOVV KIM (NOVV)	4:09	
