= Am8ic =

South Korean boy band

- Origin: Seoul, South Korea
- Genres: K-pop; dance-pop
- Years active: 2025–present
- Label: TOV Entertainment
- Members: Mingkai; Roux; Saho; Chungyi; Chen

Am8ic (Korean: 엠빅; stylized in all caps) is South Korean boy band formed by TOV Entertainment. The members are Mingkai, Roux, Saho, Chungyi, and Chen. Although all members are Chinese, Am8ic debuted in South Korea as a fifth-generation K-pop group. They officially debuted on November 10, 2025, with their first EP, "Lukoie."

== History ==
On August 31, 2025, TOV Entertainment released a logo animation of the upcoming boy group Am8ic and opened an official social media account. On September 1, the company announced that the group would officially debut in the second half of the year. Am8ic is composed of "AMBI" (meaning "two-way") and "CONNECT" (meaning "connection"), which means that lost boys can grow and be redeemed through sincere connections with each other.

On September 8, the official announcement was made that Am8ic's debut EP "Lukoie" would be released, and the release date was later announced as November 10. They released their first pre-debut single, "Escher," on September 11. The single "Buzzin" was released ahead of schedule on October 23.

== Discography ==
=== Extended plays ===
List of extended plays, showing selected details, selected chart positions, and sales figures
Title	Details	Peak chart positions	Sales
Title	Details	KOR	Sales
Lukoie	Released: November 10, 2025; Label: TOV Entertainment; Formats: CD, digital download, streaming	50	KOR: 2,012

=== Singles ===
Title	Year	Album
Lead artist
"Buzzin'"	2025	Lukoie
"Link Up"	2025	Lukoie
