= Echo (single album) =

- Digital cover

Single album by Ablume
- Released: May 9, 2025
- Length: 8:51
- Labels: Massive E&C

Singles from Echo
- 1. "Echo" Released: May 9, 2025

Echo is the debut single album by South Korean girl group Ablume. It was released by entertainment agency Massive E&C on May 9, 2025. The album contains three tracks, including the lead single of the same name.

== Development and production ==
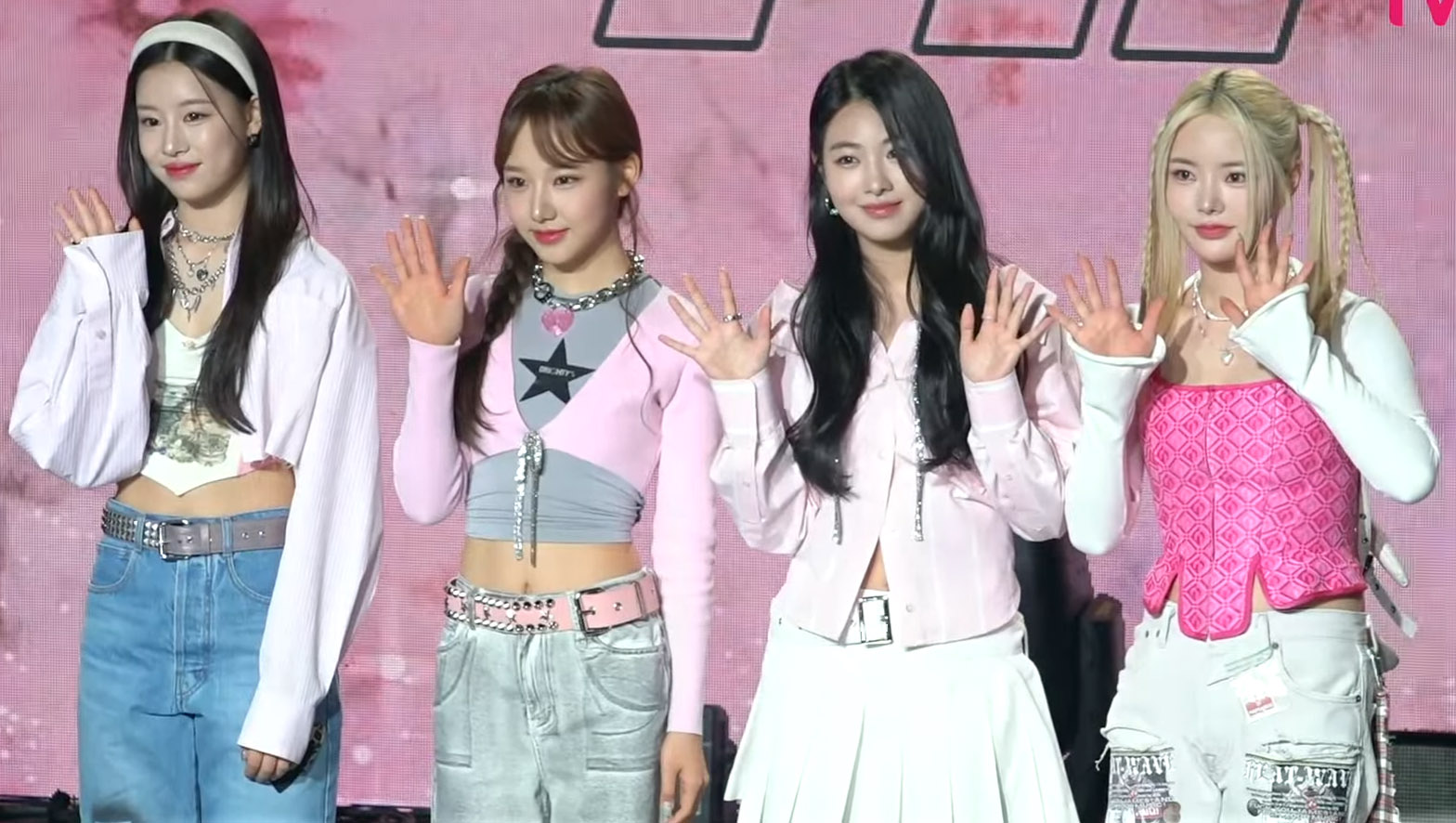
Fifty Fifty at a press conference in 2023

Saena, Aran, and Sio were previously members of South Korean girl group Fifty Fifty, where they gained popularity for their viral bubblegum song "Cupid" (2023). The three members filed an injunction to suspend their exclusive contracts with record label Attrakt on June 19, citing a lack of financial transparency, failure to fulfill contractual obligations, and medical negligence. Afterwards, the Seoul Central District Court dismissed it in its entirety on August 28, with their exclusive contracts terminated for breach of contract on October 19.

The three former members announced they had signed an exclusive contract with Massive E&C on August 12, 2024. Two months later, the trio reintroduced themselves as girl group Ablume throughout social media on October 15. The group spent their December on producing music videos, photoshoots, and uploading choreograph content online in Los Angeles, United States.

Massive E&C later announced on February 26, 2025, that the members' former manager Ahn Sung-il would be joining them to produce their upcoming debut album, set to be released in the first half of the year at the earliest. This was upon the request of Ablume during the process of discussing their future activities.

== Promotion and release ==
The girl group soon began to release a weekly webseries named The Story of Ablume, through video sharing platform YouTube starting on March 31, consisting of six episodes. A live performance video was uploaded on April 20, being a prologue version for the song "Never Far Away". Ablume revealed their debut single album titled Echo, would be released the next month and made it available for pre-save via different streaming services.

Ablume released the single album through entertainment agency Massive E&C on May 9, 2025, worldwide digitally for music download and streaming. The song with the same name had a music video premiering the same day.

== Track listing ==
Song credits adapted from audio streaming service Spotify.

| No. | Title | Lyrics | Music | Arrangement | Length |
|---|---|---|---|---|---|
| 1. | "Never Far Away" (Prologue) | Miles Barker; Glen Choi; Rachael Chevlin; Fourth Note; Hautboi Rich; Siahn | Miles Barker; Rachael Chevlin | Glen Choi; Fourth Note; Hautboi Rich; Siahn | 2:23 |
| 2. | "Echo" | Fredrik Anstensen; Glen Choi; Vegard Hurum | Fredrik Anstensen; Glen Choi; Vegard Hurum; Siahn | Glen Choi; Vegard Hurum; Siahn | 3:14 |
| 3. | "Echo" (Instrumental) | | Fredrik Anstensen; Glen Choi; Vegard Hurum; Siahn | Glen Choi; Vegard Hurum; Siahn | 3:14 |
| Total length: | | | | | 8:51 |

== Release history ==
Release dates and formats for Echo
| Region | Date | Format(s) | Labels | Ref. |
|---|---|---|---|---|
| Various | May 9, 2025 | Digital download; streaming | Massive E&C | |
