= Ablume =

South Korean girl group

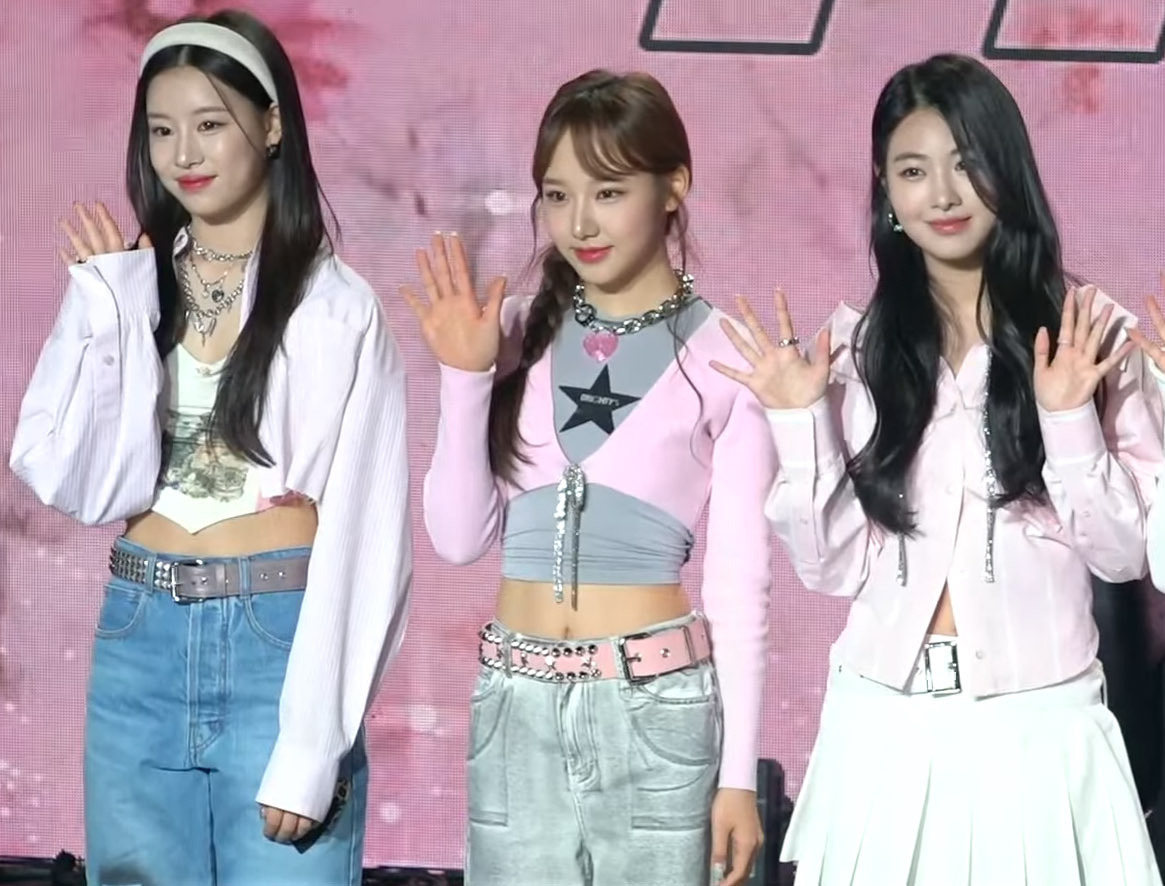
- Ablume in April 2023; L–R: Sio, Saena, and Aran

Background information
- Origin: Seoul, South Korea
- Genre: K-pop
- Years active: 2024–present
- Labels: Massive E&C
- Members: Saena; Aran; Sio
- Website: ablume.com

Ablume (Korean: 어블룸; RR: Eobeullum; stylized in all lowercase) is a South Korean girl group formed by Massive E&C. The group is composed of three members: Saena, Aran, and Sio. They reintroduced themselves in October 2024, and released a single album titled Echo in May 2025, with its lead single of the same name.

The three-piece ensemble were formerly members of the girl group Fifty Fifty. They debuted in November 2022, but after a series of legal disputes and a dismissed temporary injunction to suspend their exclusive contract, their former label Attrakt subsequently terminated their contracts and filed a lawsuit against them over damages caused by illegal acts and breach of exclusive contracts.

== Name ==
The group name originally comes from the German word blume meaning flower, which often symbolizes both personal growth and blossoming. The trio explained the name to find their charm and potential while creating "vibrant [and] diverse music". The name also draws inspiration from the Korean phrase "I hope you walk the flower road".

== History ==
=== 2022–2024: Legal disputes with Attrakt and reintroduction as Ablume ===
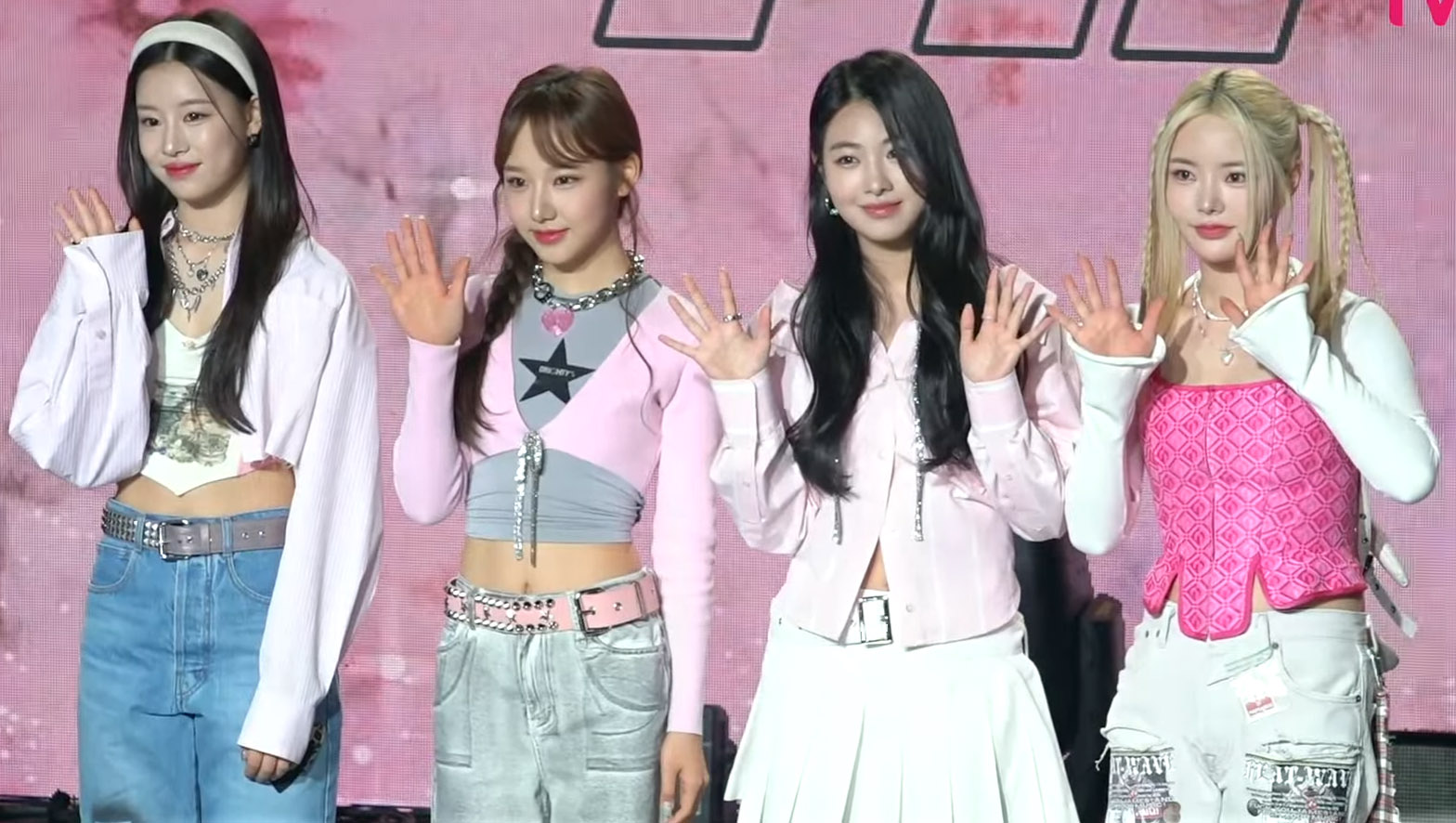
Fifty Fifty in April 2023 L–R: Sio, Saena, Aran, and Keena

Saena, Aran, and Sio were previously members of South Korean girl group Fifty Fifty since November 2022, where they gained popularity for their viral bubblegum song "Cupid" (2023).

The group soon filed an injunction to suspend their exclusive contracts with record label Attrakt on June 19, citing a lack of financial transparency, failure to fulfill contractual obligations, and medical negligence. The injunction application was without merit and dismissed it in its entirety on August 28, from Seoul Central District Court, stating that the plaintiffs failed to sufficiently explain their reasons for filing a contract injunction and difficult to view the materials they submitted as evidence for the breakdown of trust between the two parties. Two days later, the group filed to appeal this decision.

Keena eventually withdrew her appeal against the record label on October 16, stating she lost faith in their former manager who proposed the injunction, Ahn Sung-il, and regretted that she did not contact Attrakt before starting legal procedures. Afterwards, the former agency terminated their exclusive contracts for breach of contract on October 19. Their appeal was rejected from court on October 24. Attrakt immediately filed a civil lawsuit on December 19, against the former members, their parents, and two executives of production company The Givers: Ahn Sung-il and Baek Jin-sil.

Saena, Aran, and Sio announced they had signed an exclusive contract with Massive E&C on August 12, 2024. Two months later, the trio reintroduced themselves as Ablume throughout social media on October 15. This caused the Korea Management Federation (KMF) to condemn the trio for its accused attempts in tampering with their former record label, and attempting to resume their entertainment activities. The Korea Music Content Association (KMCA) also said on December 13 that it was considering excluding artists and labels involved in tampering allegations from appearing on the Circle Chart and not to submit their sales figures to music television programs and award ceremonies. Ablume spent their final month on producing music videos, photoshoots, and uploading choreograph content online in Los Angeles, United States. Shortly after, the trio covered "Text Me Merry Christmas" (2014) by American a cappella group Straight No Chaser, throughout social media on December 19.

=== 2025–present: Debut with single album Echo ===
Massive E&C later announced on February 26, 2025, that the members' former manager Ahn Sung-il would be joining them to produce their upcoming debut album, set to be released in the first half of the year at the earliest. This was upon the request of Ablume during the process of discussing their future activities, since they thought than Ahn was "someone who understands us better than anyone and has helped us create some of our most meaningful work".

A webseries titled The Story of Ablume was released weekly on March 31, consisting of six episodes. A prologue version for the song "Never Far Away" was released on April 20 via video sharing platform YouTube.

In April, it was announced that Ablume would release their debut single album Echo on May 9, with a music video premiering the same day.

== Members ==
- Saena (새나)
- Aran (아란)
- Sio (시오)

== Discography ==
=== Single albums ===
List of single albums, with selected details
Title	Details
Echo	Released: May 9, 2025; Label: Massive E&C; Formats: Digital download, streaming

=== Singles ===
List of singles, showing year released, and name of the album
Title	Year	Album
"Echo"	2025	Echo

== Videography ==
=== Music videos ===
List of music videos, showing year released, and director(s)
Title	Year	Album	Director(s)	Ref.
"Echo"	2025	Echo	Minjun Lee, Hayoung Lee (MOSWANTD)	

=== Web series ===
List of web series credits, with selected details
Year	Title	Notes	Ref.
2025	The Story of Ablume	Docuseries; 6 episodes	

== See also ==
- List of South Korean girl groups
