= Imperfect-I'mperfect =

- Digital cover

EP by Fifty Fifty
- Released: June 1, 2026
- Length: 18:19
- Language: Korean; English
- Label: Attrakt; Sony Music Korea

Fifty Fifty chronology
Day & Night (2025)	Imperfect-I'mperfect (2026)

Singles from Imperfect-I'mperfect
- 1. "Starstruck" Released: May 15, 2026; 2. "Like a Bubble" Released: June 1, 2026

Professional ratings
Review scores
Source	Rating
IZM	4/5 stars

Imperfect-I'mperfect is the fourth extended play by South Korean girl group Fifty Fifty. It was released by Attrakt on June 1, 2026, and contains six tracks, including the pre-release single "Starstruck" and lead single "Like a Bubble".

== Background and release ==
On May 4, 2026, Attrakt announced that Fifty Fifty would be releasing a new album targeted at early June as a four-member group, while member Hana continues to be on hiatus due to health reasons. The group performed a preview of one of the tracks titled "Starstruck" at the Mediacorp Cloud 9 music event held on May 9 in Singapore. On May 11, it was confirmed that their fourth extended play Imperfect-I'mperfect would be released on June 1. Upon the release of the promotion scheduler on May 12, "Starstruck" was announced to be released as a pre-release single on May 15. Following the release of concept photos beginning on May 19, music video preview photos were released on May 23 and 24. On May 26, with the release of the tracklist, the lead single for the extended play was announced to be titled "Like a Bubble". The highlight medley video of the album's tracks was released on May 28. Two music video teasers for "Like a Bubble" were released on May 29 and 31 respectively. On June 1, the extended play was released alongside the music video for "Like a Bubble".

== Track listing ==
Track listing for Imperfect-I'mperfect
No.	Title	Lyrics	Music	Arrangement(s)	Length
1.	"Starstruck"	Danke; Lee Aeng-du (153/Joombas); Jeje and Paul (Artiffect); 3! (Lalala Studio)	Timothy Tan; Yuval Chain; Taylor Upsahl; Conor Blake Manning; MLite	Tim Tan; Uvkillinem	2:57
2.	"Like a Bubble"	Na Yoon-jeong (Lalala Studio); Yoon Ye-ji (Artiffect); Monsun (Papermaker); Lee Song-yoo (MUMW); Park Sang-yu (153/Joombas); Humbler; Lee Seung-ho	Humbler; Lee Seung-ho	Humbler	3:08
3.	"Took It Too Far"	Lee Ji-yeon (Lalala Studio); Uyeon (Papermaker); Jeong Se-hui (MUMW); Kim Ji-young (MUMW); Ryumona (153/Joombas); Bay (153/Joombas); Heesu (Papermaker); 3! (Lalala Studio); Baek So-hyeon (Papermaker); Lim Soo-ran (Lalala Studio); Jeje and Paul (Artiffect); Nogeum (Artiffect); Yooyoung (Papermaker); Seon-hui (Artiffect)	Jere Särkkä; Ayelle	Jere Särkkä	3:17
4.	"Perfect"	Mignon; PD JJ; Lee Si-yeon (Lalala Studio); Nebada (Lalala Studio); 3! (Lalala Studio); Jang Seung-min (Lalala Studio)	Scott Russell Stoddart; Kristin Marie	Scott Russell Stoddart; Kristin Marie	2:57
5.	"Genie Magic"	Danke; Jiggy (153/Joombas); Seo Yong-won (153/Joombas); Kim Seung-hyeon (Artiffect); 507 (Artiffect); Cha Lee-rin (153/Joombas)	Humbler; Andre Nookadu; Axel Nookadu	Humbler	3:06
6.	"Carry On"	3! (Lalala Studio); Mok Ji-min (Lalala Studio)	Kella Armitage; Lina Hansson; Sean McDonagh; Dominic Liu	Kingdoms	2:54
Total length:					18:19

== Charts ==
=== Weekly charts ===
Weekly chart performance for Imperfect-I'mperfect
Chart (2026)	Peak position
South Korean Albums (Circle)	6

=== Monthly charts ===
Monthly chart performance for Imperfect-I'mperfect
Chart (2026)	Peak position
South Korean Albums (Circle)	17

== Release history ==
Release history for Imperfect-I'mperfect
Region	Date	Format	Label
South Korea	June 1, 2026	CD	Attrakt; Sony Music Korea
Various	June 1, 2026	Digital download; streaming	Attrakt; Sony Music Korea
