= Starry Night (Fifty Fifty song) =

Single by Fifty Fifty

from the EP Love Tune
- Language: Korean and English
- Released: August 30, 2024
- Genre: K-pop Pop
- Length: 3:04
- Label: Attrakt
- Composers: Ejae; Kole; Alawn
- Lyricists: Lee Hyeong-seok; Ni-woo; Seulrhyme; Ejae (Note: English version only); Kole (Note: English version only)

Fifty Fifty singles chronology
"Cupid" (2023)	"Starry Night" (2024)	"SOS" (2024)

Music video
- "Starry Night" on YouTube

Professional ratings
Review scores
Source	Rating
IZM	3/5 stars

"Starry Night" is a song recorded by South Korean girl group Fifty Fifty from their second extended play, Love Tune (2024). It was released on August 30, 2024 through Attrakt as a pre-release single from the EP. It marked Fifty Fifty's first release following their reorganization into a five-member group.

== Background ==
The group announced on August 21, 2024, that the song is going to be released on August 30, 2024. The group released concept photos for the song. The group also released two music video teasers on August 27 and August 28.

== Composition ==
"Starry Night" has been described as a song that is "airy and floaty and mostly pleasant".

== Music video ==
A music video was released on August 30, 2024, and rated as "General Audiences". The music video begins with five shooting stars landing on earth with each of the members picking it up and making their own, shining light.

== Personnel ==
Musicians

- Fifty Fifty – performer

Technical

- Ejae – composer, English lyrics
- Ni-woo (PNP) – lyrics
- Lee Hyeong-seok (PNP) – lyrics
- Seulrhyme (PNP) – lyrics
- Alawn – arranger, composer
- Nicole Cohen a.k.a. Kole – composer, English lyrics

== Charts ==
=== Weekly charts ===
Weekly chart performance for "Starry Night"
Chart (2024)	Peak position
South Korea (Circle)	105

=== Monthly charts ===
Monthly chart performance for "Starry Night"
Chart (2024)	Peak position
South Korea (Circle)	133
