= Love Tune =

- Digital cover

EP by Fifty Fifty
- Released: September 20, 2024
- Length: 18:21
- Languages: Korean; English
- Labels: Attrakt; Arista
- Producers: Blood Circle (PNP); Alawn; Joshua Linne; Nikolay Mohr; Adam von Mentzer; Bhav

Fifty Fifty chronology
The Beginning (2023)	Love Tune (2024)	Love Tune: Rewired (2025)

Singles from Love Tune
- 1. "Starry Night" Released: August 30, 2024; 2. "SOS" Released: September 20, 2024

Love Tune is the second extended play by South Korean girl group Fifty Fifty and first release since their re-organization as a five-member group. It was released by Attrakt on September 20, 2024 and contains six tracks, including the lead single "SOS" and the pre-release single "Starry Night".

== Background and release ==
In 2023, after the international success of their single "Cupid", the members of Fifty Fifty filed a lawsuit against Attrakt, claiming that the company had failed to provide financial data and had neglected their mental health. In October, one of the members, Keena, dropped her lawsuit and the contracts of the remaining three members (Aran, Sio, and Saena) were terminated by Attrakt. In August 2024, Attrakt revealed the new members of the group, Chanelle Moon, Yewon, Hanna, and Athena, announcing that the group would release their second extended play in September.

On August 30, the pre-release single "Starry Night" was released by Attrakt along with its music video. Attrakt revealed on September 2 that Fifty Fifty's second extended play Love Tune would be released on September 20, and a promotional schedule was released the following day. The first set of concept photos were released on September 6 and 7. This was followed by the track listing on September 9, then the second round of concept photos and a visual clip between September 10 and 12. The highlight medley was released on September 13, and two music video teasers for "SOS" were released on September 16 and 19. The album was released alongside the music video for "SOS" on September 20.

== Composition ==
The opening track "Push Your Love" is a bright bubblegum pop track that follows in the style of "Cupid". This is followed by "Starry Night" and its English version, which is an airy and floaty tune that sounds like a JYP girl group song. "SOS" and its English version have a laid-back Latin pop vibe with a go-go rhythm and 1970s-style acoustic guitar with lyrics that "paint a cry for help on another sleepless night". The closing track "Gravity" is an "epic EDM rock number" with explosive power and high notes from the members.

== Critical reception ==
Professional ratings
Review scores
Source	Rating
IZM	4.5/5 stars
NME	3/5 stars

Love Tune received generally favourable reviews from music critics. So Seung-geun from IZM gave the EP a score of 4.5 stars out of five, stating that it "has extracted the honest feelings [the members] have felt and have wanted to express into beautiful and good music". On the other hand, Gladys Yeo from NME gave the EP a score of 3 stars out of 5, calling it a "consistent and decently performed pop record with a few major faults".

== Track listing ==
Love Tune track listing
No.	Title	Lyrics	Music	Arrangement	Length
1.	"Push Your Love"	Maria Marcus; Yoon Yeong-ji (PNP); Lee Hyeong-seok (PNP); Jeong Chil-li (PNP); Hyeong-geun (PNP); Ha So-ra (PNP)	Blood Circle (PNP); Marcus; Ruby Baek (PNP)	Blood Circle (PNP)	2:59
2.	"Starry Night"	Lee Hyeong-seok (PNP); Seulrhyme (PNP); Ni-woo (PNP)	Alawn; Ejae; Nicole "Kole" Cohen	Alawn	3:04
3.	"Starry Night" (English version)	Ejae; Nicole "Kole" Cohen	Alawn; Ejae; Nicole "Kole" Cohen	Alawn	3:04
4.	"SOS"	Lee Hyeon-seok (PNP); Mola (PNP); Mute (PNP)	Moa Pettersson Hammar; Joshua Linne; Nikolay Mohr; Adam von Mentzer; PD JJ	Linne; Mohr; von Mentzer	3:07
5.	"SOS" (English version)	Lee Hyeon-seok (PNP); Sophiya	Hammar; Linne; Mohr; von Mentzer; PD JJ	Linne; Mohr; von Mentzer	3:07
6.	"Gravity"	Avokid; Lee Ga-yoon; Distract; Go-yoo (PNP); Oranji (PNP)	Bhav; Lee Ga-yoon; Avokid; PD JJ	Bhav	2:57
Total length:					18:21

== Love Tune: Rewired ==
Love Tune: Rewired

Remix album by Fifty Fifty
- Released: January 24, 2025
- Length: 30:59
- Languages: Korean; English; Japanese; Chinese
- Label: Attrakt

Fifty Fifty chronology
Love Tune (2024)	Love Tune: Rewired (2025)	Day & Night (2025)

Love Tune: Rewired is a remix album that contains remixed versions of tracks from the Love Tune EP. In addition to remixes, the album includes re-recorded versions in Japanese, Chinese, and English. It was released digitally on January 24, 2025.

=== Track listing ===
No.	Title	Length
1.	"Starry Night" (Orchestral version)	3:05
2.	"SOS" (Miami bass remix)	3:04
3.	"SOS" (Night bass remix)	3:29
4.	"Gravity" (Garage remix)	3:35
5.	"Gravity" (R&B remix)	3:14
6.	"Push Your Love" (80s remix)	2:45
7.	"Push Your Love" (Funk remix)	2:48
8.	"Gravity" (Japanese version)	2:57
9.	"Push Your Love" (Chinese version)	2:59
10.	"Push Your Love" (English version)	2:59
Total length:		30:59

== Charts ==
=== Weekly charts ===
Chart performance for Love Tune
Chart (2024)	Peak position
South Korean Albums (Circle)	11

=== Monthly charts ===
Monthly chart performance for Love Tune
Chart (2024)	Peak position
South Korean Albums (Circle)	37

== Release history ==
Release history for Love Tune
Region	Date	Format	Version	Label
South Korea	September 20, 2024	CD	Original	Attrakt; Sony Music Korea
Various	September 20, 2024	Digital download; streaming	Original	Attrakt
Various	September 27, 2024	Digital download; streaming	Sped up	Attrakt
United States	October 25, 2024	CD	Original	Attrakt; Arista Records
