= Day & Night (Fifty Fifty EP) =

- Digital cover

EP by Fifty Fifty
- Released: April 29, 2025
- Length: 17:35
- Language: Korean; English
- Label: Attrakt; Sony Music Korea
- Producer: Cooper Holzman; Valensia; Charlie McClean; Scott Dasco; TRXD; PhD; Louis Schoorl

Fifty Fifty chronology
Love Tune: Rewired (2025)	Day & Night (2025)	Imperfect-I'mperfect (2026)

Singles from Day & Night
- 1. "Perfect Crime" Released: April 7, 2025; 2. "Pookie" / "Midnight Special" Released: April 29, 2025

Day & Night is the third extended play by South Korean girl group Fifty Fifty. It was released by Attrakt on April 29, 2025, and contains six tracks, including the pre-release single "Perfect Crime", and the lead singles "Pookie" and "Midnight Special".

== Background and release ==
On March 24, Fifty Fifty began posting a series of cryptic images under an affiliated Instagram account under the name "hidetheclue.5050", hinting at the concept of their upcoming release. On March 30, the release of a digital single was announced by unveiling the poster for "Perfect Crime" through official social media channels. The digital single "Perfect Crime" was released on April 7. A day later, on April 8, Attrakt announced that Fifty Fifty would be releasing their third extended play Day & Night on April 29. A comeback poster image was also released on the same day. On October 7, the track listing was released with "Pookie" and "Midnight Special" revealed as the lead singles. On April 21 the highlight medley video was released. On April 28, a teaser video for the music video of "Pookie" was released. The extended play was released alongside the music video for "Pookie" on April 29.

On May 9, a teaser for the special music video for "Midnight Special" was released. The special music video for "Midnight Special" was released on May 13, 2025 as scheduled.

== Composition ==
"Pookie" is a charismatic blend of playful lyrics and infectious beats meanwhile "Adonis" contains bubbly and smooth melodies with an addictive hook. "Work of Art" is a retro-style ballad with old-school R&B sensibilities. "Heartbreak" is an acoustic-based ballad with impressive delicate vocals. "Perfect Crime" is an atmospheric, synth-pop track that explores the emotions of yearning in a relationship, amplified by soaring harmonies that heighten its emotional depth. "Midnight Special" is an up-tempo pop track that captures the energetic atmosphere of the night. The 808-style drums and bass add a modern touch to the song, while the Rhodes keyboard and electric guitar fill it with an organic texture, delivering the warm mood of classic pop.

== Critical reception ==
Professional ratings
Review scores
Source	Rating
IZM	3.5/5 stars

Lim Dong-yeop from IZM gave the extended play a positive score of 3.5 stars out of five, stating that "since the team's reorganization, they haven't missed a beat — just as with last year's Love Tune, they show the same quality in this album Day & Night. Their calm yet firm groove remains intact even in an explosive storm."

== Commercial performance ==
According to data from Hanteo Chart, Day & Night recorded 100,121 copies in its first-week sales during the week of April 29 to May 5, 2025, marking the highest first-week album sales for the group.

== Track listing ==
Track listing for Day & Night
No.	Title	Lyrics	Music	Arrangement	Length
1.	"Pookie"	Elle Campbell; Sam Preston; Cooper Holzman; McDamon; Kim In-hyung; Seong Yu-jin; Go Jin-young; Seul La-im; Jang Ha-ni; Lee Hyeong-seok; Oranji; Skinner Box	Campbell; Preston; Holzman	Holzman	2:32
2.	"Adonis"	Valensia; Charlie McClean	Valensia; McClean; McDamon	Valensia; McClean	2:39
3.	"Work of Art"	Madalen Duke; Ryan Curtis; Oranji; Lim Hyo-jeong; Jang Da-in; Hyokki; Lazy J; Kim Da-gam; Naryu; Baek Sae-im; Lee Jae-ni; Cosy; Noey	Scott Dasco; Duke; Curtis; Hautboi Rich	Dasco	3:17
4.	"Perfect Crime"	Ida Botten; McDamom; Lee Ji-ham	David Atarodiyan; Botten; McDamon	TRXD	3:16
5.	"Heartbreak"	Peter Wallevik; Daniel Davidsen; Chelcee Grimes; Iain James; Gaho; McDamon; Naryu; Kang Yeong-bin; Lee Jae-ni; Amy Y; Cosy; Yoon Ye-ji; Hyoren	Wallevik; Davidsen; Grimes; James	PhD	3:01
6.	"Midnight Special"	Hannah Wilson; McDamon; Park Hyeon-jin; Jang Won-gyo; Joo Tae-im; Lee Na-yoon; Hyoren; Jang Da-in; Lim Hyo-jeong; Yansol; Joysoo; Yoon Ye-ji; Moon Bo-ryeong; Oranji; Son Jeong-hyeok; Kim Si-woo; Yoo Ji-sang	Louis Schoorl; Wilson	Schoorl	2:47
Total length:					17:35

== Charts ==
=== Weekly charts ===
Chart performance for Day & Night
Chart (2025)	Peak position
South Korean Albums (Circle)	3

=== Monthly charts ===
Chart performance for Day & Night
Chart (2025)	Peak position
South Korean Albums (Circle)	38

== Release history ==
Release history for Day & Night
Region	Date	Format	Label
South Korea	April 29, 2025	CD	Attrakt; Sony Music Korea
Various	April 29, 2025	Digital download; streaming	Attrakt; Sony Music Korea
