= David Yong =

Singaporean businessman (born 1987)

- Born: 1987 (age 38–39); Singapore
- Other name: Duong Dara
- Education: Anglo-Chinese Junior College; University of Bristol (LLB)
- Occupations: Businessman; singer
- Years active: 2014–present
- Title: CEO of Evergreen Group Holdings
- Musical career
- Origin: Seoul, South Korea
- Genre: K-pop
- Instrument: Vocals
- Years active: 2021–present
- Label: RBW

David Yong
- Simplified Chinese: 杨孔霖
- Traditional Chinese: 楊孔霖
Transcriptions
Standard Mandarin
- Hanyu Pinyin: Yáng Kǒnglín

Yong Khung Lin (Chinese: 杨孔霖, born 1987), more commonly known as David Yong is a Singaporean businessman and singer. He is the current chief executive officer (CEO) of Evergreen Group Holdings of Singapore, a company with interests in timber trading, real estate, lifestyle and entertainment. In 2024, he was charged with falsification of accounts.

== Early life and education ==
Yong was born into a family with a timber trading business. His interest in K-pop was sparked in 2017 when he took his younger brother to a concert by the K-pop girl group Twice in Singapore. He attended the Anglo-Chinese Junior College.

He studied law at the University of Bristol in the United Kingdom in 2013. Initially working as a lawyer, he soon joined his family's timber business, Evergreen Teak Trading, founded by his father Yong Ing Fatt in 1990. In 2014, following Myanmar's ban on raw timber exports, Yong decided to shift his focus to furniture manufacturing, specializing in high-quality Burmese teak. The move into furniture manufacturing helped expand Evergreen Group Holdings (Evergreen GH) beyond timber trading.

== Career ==
=== Music career ===
In May 2021, Yong moved to South Korea to pursue his music ambitions and was signed by Rainbowbridge World (RBW), the agency of popular K-pop girl group Mamamoo. He initially found it difficult to communicate in Korean, having to learn it within a span of months. He first collaborated with 4Men on the track "My Way", which was released in December 2021. Yong made his music career on 5 July 2022, releasing a hip-hop track, "In My Pocket", featuring Kid Milli, and produced by Jeon Ji-yoon. "In My Pocket" received 10 million views, and more than 400 comments on YouTube.

=== Business career ===
Yong is the chief executive of Evergreen GH and runs more than 15 businesses. Evergreen GH diversified its business portfolio to include real estate, lifestyle and entertainment. The company partnered with RBW to distribute content across Southeast Asia, co-produce artists and establish training schools for K-pop aspirants in the region.

Following his debut in 2022, he invested approximately ₩10 billion ($7.5 million) in the South Korean K-pop entertainment agency Attrakt. At the time of his investment, Attrakt was facing challenges, including a legal dispute with its only artist, the girl group Fifty Fifty.

In August 2024, after the news broke of Yong being charged in Singaporean court for falsifying tax invoices for Evergreen GH, Attrakt stated that despite the memorandum of understanding signed between Yong and them, Yong's investment then had been minimal and that his ongoing legal issues would have minimal impact on their operations.

== Personal life ==
Yong previously resided in the tallest tower in Seoul, the Lotte World Tower. In 2023, he gained Cambodian citizenship through naturalisation despite Singapore not allowing adults to hold dual citizenship, and renamed himself to Duong Dara.

== Legal issues ==
In August 2024, he was arrested and charged with four counts of falsification of accounts.He allegedly instigated a Jolene Low Mong Han in December 2021 to falsify a tax invoice dated 1 September 2021, from Evergreen Assets Management for purported bulk sales of household fittings and appliances to a person named Mr Roy Teo. He had surrendered his Cambodian passport to Cambodian authorities in June 2024. He was given a bail of $1 million.

On 30 August 2024, his application to travel to Japan was denied. His second and third applications to travel overseas were also denied on 19 February 2025 and 20 March 2025 respectively. On 20 March 2025, it was also revealed that he had attempted to obtain a Grenadian passport in March 2024 and January 2025.

In June 2025, he was charged with another count of falsification of accounts. He was also permitted to travel to Seoul and Kuala Lumpur on business in July and August.

In September 2025, his application to travel to Japan and China was approved. His bail was also increased by $500,000 to $1.5 million. He was also fined $1,000 by the Law Society of Singapore for holding an executive appointment in a business entity.

In March 2026, he was charged with a further twelve counts for conspiring to make false entries in accounts and issuing illegal loans. The new charges are mainly for abetting by conspiring with a Thung Sai Fun with the intent to defraud. False entries were allegedly made in accounts belonging to Evergreen Assets Management from 2019 to 2023.
