= Fifty Fifty (group) =

South Korean girl group

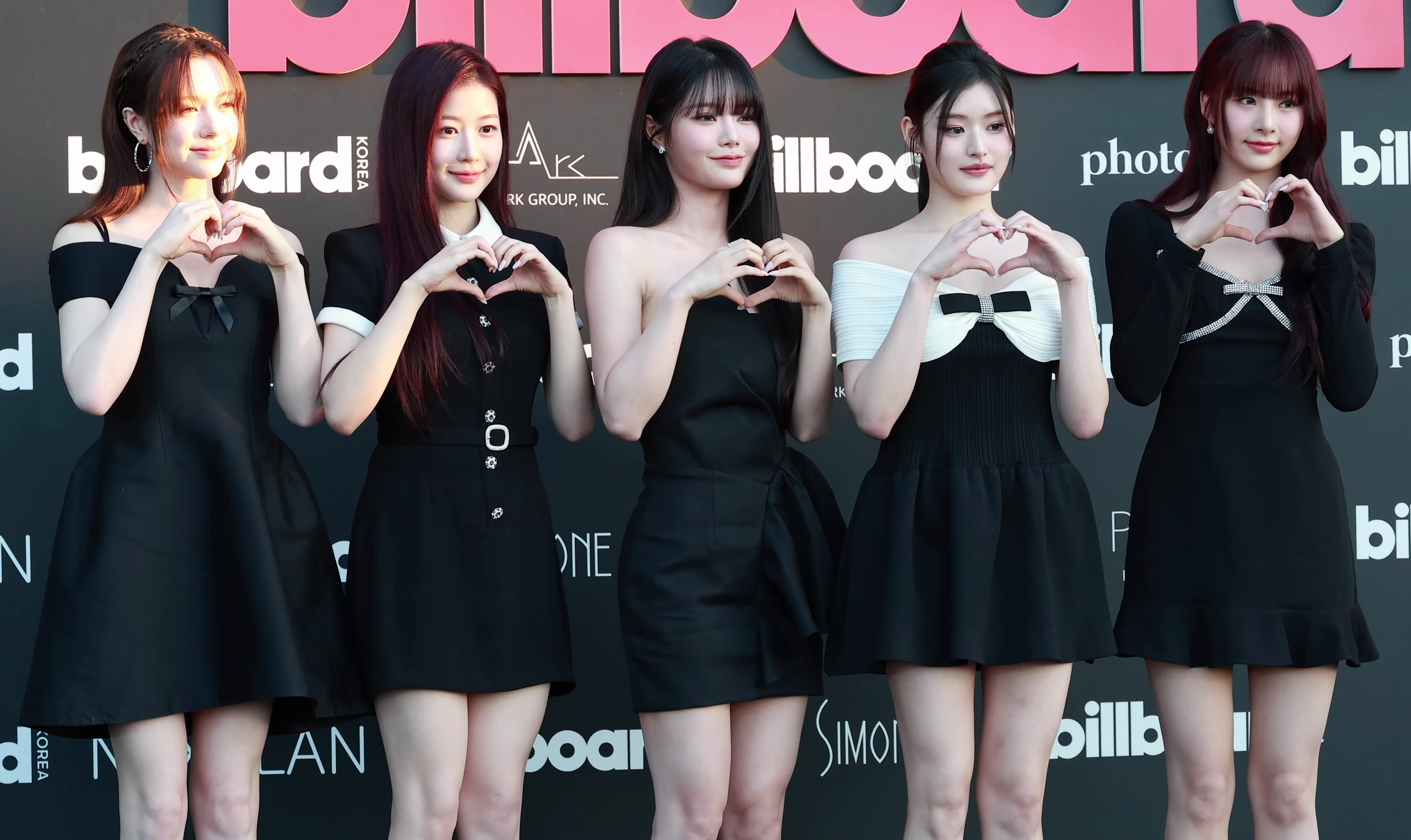
- Fifty Fifty in August 2024; L–R: Chanelle Moon, Yewon, Keena, Athena, and Hana

Background information
- Origin: Seoul, South Korea
- Genres: K-pop; R&B; dance-pop
- Years active: 2022–present
- Labels: Attrakt; Arista
- Members: Keena; Chanelle Moon; Yewon; Hana; Athena
- Past members: Saena; Aran; Sio
- Website: theattrakt.com/fifty_fifty

Fifty Fifty (Korean: 피프티 피프티; stylized in all caps) is a South Korean girl group formed by Attrakt in November 2022. The group consists of five members: Keena, Chanelle Moon, Yewon, Hana, and Athena.

Fifty Fifty debuted on November 18, 2022, with their extended play (EP) The Fifty. They experienced a commercial breakthrough with their viral hit single "Cupid". The single, which was released in February 2023, made Fifty Fifty the fastest K-pop group to enter the US Billboard Hot 100 and UK Singles Chart, within four months of debut. Furthermore, it made them the first K-pop girl group to enter the top ten of the UK charts.

Originally debuting as a four-member group, the lineup changed following a legal dispute between members and their agency. After a court dismissed a request to suspend their exclusive contracts, Attrakt terminated the contracts of Saena, Aran, and Sio, and later filed a lawsuit citing breach of contract and other claims. In 2024, the group relaunched with a new lineup: Chanelle Moon, Yewon, Hana, and Athena. Keena, the only remaining original member, continued her activities with the reorganized group.

== Name ==
Fifty Fifty's official logo

The group's name, Fifty Fifty, indicates the coexistence, in equal parts, of a hope-filled ideal and a harsh reality, as well as their hope to become a whole 100 with their fans.

== History ==
=== Pre-debut ===
In 2019, Attrakt CEO Jeon Hong-joon and the CEO of performance production company KAMP met in Singapore during a festival and decided to work together to produce a global K-pop girl group, with KAMP in charge of the overseas marketing. The two companies were joined by one of KAMP employees and producer, Ahn Sung-il (Siahn). Twelve trainees were recruited by Jeon for a year starting in December 2019 and were finally reduced to four through monthly evaluations.

In January 2021, KAMP left the project due to differing views over the global strategy. The following May, Ahn and two other KAMP employees who had been involved in the project resigned and established The Givers: while Jeon was in charge of raising money, Ahn chose the music direction and trained the members in music theory, singing, dancing, rapping, acting and English. More than ₩20–30 million a month was spent on the group, and more than a billion was invested in the production of four music videos.

Prior to the group's debut, Saena participated as a contestant on KBS' dancing competition show Dancing High.

=== 2022: Introduction and debut with The Fifty ===
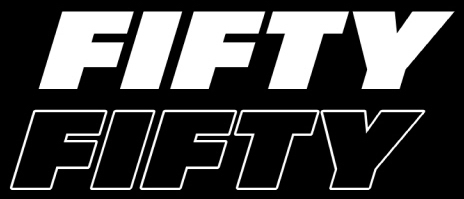
Fifty Fifty's official logo (2022–2024)

After two years of training, on November 14, 2022, Fifty Fifty announced that they would be debuting within the month by releasing the group's official logo image posted across all the group's social media accounts. The same day, a pre-released music video for the song "Lovin Me" was released on their official YouTube channel. The members were revealed on November 15 through the concept photo of their debut album, which revealed the names and the debut date, and official photos of the members for the first time. A performance video of "Log In" was also released the same day.

Fifty Fifty released their debut extended play (EP) The Fifty on November 18, with "Higher" serving as the lead single. The album contains the first journey of girls who yearn for freedom beyond the chaos of reality and eventually move on to a utopia. It consists of four tracks – "Higher", which has an R&B pop feeling that sings about the world of ecstasy and dreams, "Tell Me", a city pop song, "Lovin Me", which conveys a message of comfort to young people who are going through growing pains, and "Log In", which expresses the movements of girls who rebel to escape from the suffocating real world with intense performances. Promotions for the EP's release began on November 22, with their music broadcast debut on SBS M's The Show and ended on KBS2's Music Bank on December 2. The EP did not enter the Circle Album Chart when it was first released, but it debuted at number forty-four on the chart issue dated December 18–24, with 2,597 album sales. Korean critic magazine IZM rated the album 4.5 out of 5 stars, the highest rating the magazine has ever given to a girl group. The writer, Son Seung-geun, opined that Fifty Fifty "is a good example of what happens when great songs and good singers meet. Thanks to them, Korea has one more good girl group."

Fifty Fifty was selected as one of The Recording Academy's "K-pop Girl Groups To Watch in 2023", writing, "the quartet displays various colors and a vocal maturity that is both hard to find and crucial to have." They were also named one of the "Best K-pop Debuts of the Year" by Rolling Stone India, and "Tell Me" and "Lovin' Me" were featured on the lists of the "Best K-pop Songs of 2022" compiled by Paper and Mashable, respectively.

=== 2023: International success with "Cupid" and legal dispute with Attrakt ===
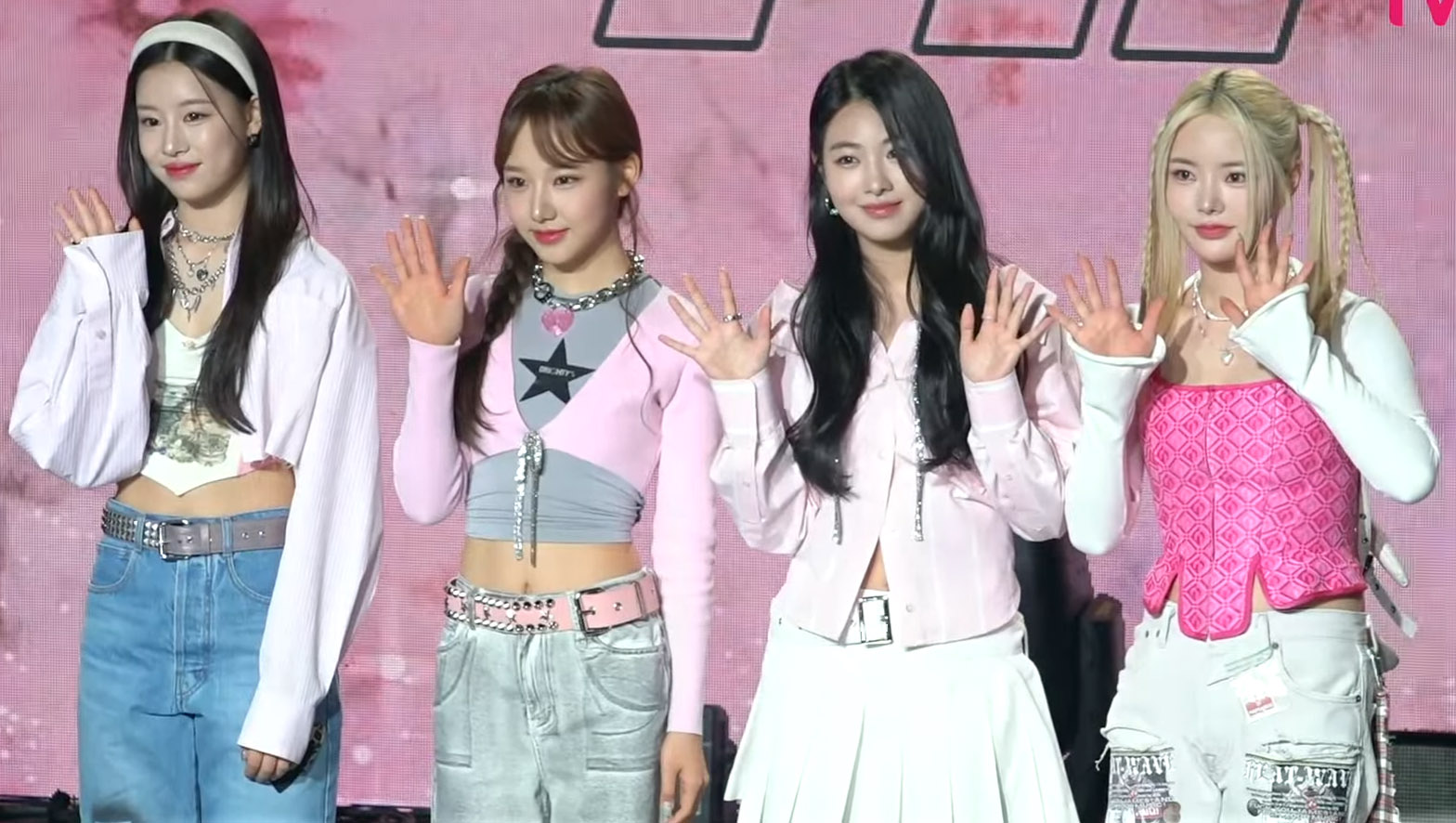
Fifty Fifty in April 2023 L–R: Sio, Saena, Aran, and Keena

On February 24, 2023, the group released their first single album, The Beginning: Cupid, along with the music video for the lead single "Cupid". The song, which was recorded both in Korean and English, saw Keena writing part of the Korean lyrics. Soon after, a fan-made sped-up rendition of the English version went viral on TikTok. "Cupid" consequently entered the Billboard Hot 100 on March 27, making them the sixth group and the fastest K-pop group in history to do so. The song went on to become the highest-charting hit by a South Korean girl group in the history of the Pop Airplay chart, and the second South Korean music act to land on the Adult Pop Airplay after BTS. In April, Fifty Fifty formed a partnership with Warner Music Korea.

On June 19, the members of the group filed for an injunction to suspend their exclusive contracts with Attrakt, citing the violation of contractual obligations, as well as the lack of transparency in financial settlements, and medical negligence, during the group's promotions. They also filed for trademarks of the group's name and their stage names. The news of the injunction was belatedly revealed to the public after Attrakt accused Warner Music Korea and Ahn Sung-il of trying to get the members to violate their contracts to sign with another agency. While both parties denied the claim, Attrakt filed criminal charges against Ahn and three other individuals for fraud, breach of duty, and obstruction of business.

The ongoing lawsuit resulted in the cancellation of advertising contracts and the KCON LA 2023 appearance scheduled for August 19. Filming for the music video for "Barbie Dreams" from the Barbie movie soundtrack, released on July 6, also fell through. On August 28, the Seoul Central District Court sided with Attrakt against Fifty Fifty, dismissing the injunction. Fifty Fifty's law firm, Barun Law, stated that the group would immediately appeal against the dismissal. On October 17, one of the members, Keena, withdrew her lawsuit against Attrakt and returned to her original agency. On October 23, Attrakt announced the termination of the exclusive contracts of the remaining three members (Saena, Aran, and Sio) as of October 19. On October 24, the Seoul High Court upheld the decision to dismiss the injunction. In 2024, Saena, Aran, and Sio signed with Massive E&C and formed a new trio, Ablume.

On October 29, Attrakt announced that Keena would be at the Billboard Music Awards on behalf of the group, with plans to re-organize the group in the future. On November 2, it was confirmed that the group would be continuing with a "second generation" of members, with Keena as part of the lineup, alongside three new members. On November 24, Fifty Fifty became the first K-pop girl group to enter the Billboard Hot 100 year-end, after "Cupid" ranked 44th in the list.

=== 2024: Re-organization as 5-member group and Love Tune ===
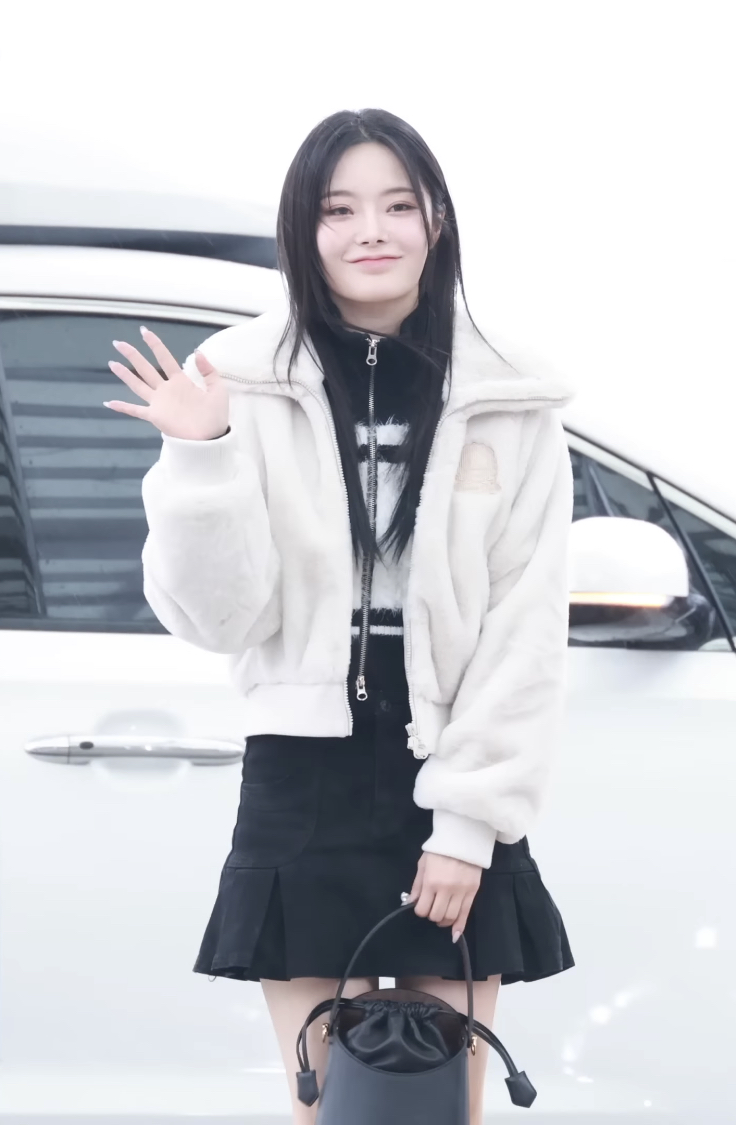
Keena, the only member of Fifty Fifty who returned to Attrakt

On January 8, 2024, it was confirmed that auditions were conducted to recruit three to four new members to join Fifty Fifty alongside Keena, with a view to re-launch the group as a four or five-member girl group. One of these auditions was set to take place from January to February in the Southeast Asian region, specifically in Singapore and Thailand, to recruit new members in preparation for the re-debut of Fifty Fifty, which was slated to proceed in the second quarter. Attrakt's CEO Jeon Hong-joon and Singaporean K-pop singer David Yong (who is also CEO of a Singaporean company) were set to overlook the Southeast Asia audition as part of its judging panel.

On February 3, the first on-site audition took place at Kallang Place in Singapore, with about 120 youths, including those who were either Singaporeans or other nationalities, taking part in the auditions. A final round would take place in Thailand on February 17 to select three or four new members out of the finalists to join Fifty Fifty. Not only that, Attrakt also held auditions in Japan and South Korea for potential candidates to join Fifty Fifty. The tentative plan was to complete the final lineup group in April and to re-debut Fifty Fifty in June. Subsequently, the final audition in Thailand was rescheduled to take place on March 2. Three Singaporeans were selected from the audition in Singapore to join the final audition round in Thailand. It was reported that there would be at least 30 or so candidates who would compete in the final audition.

On March 11, the three former Fifty Fifty members lost their breach of trust claim filed against Attrakt, after the police decided to dismiss the investigations of Attrakt on charges of alleged embezzlement, having found that there was no evidence of suspected criminal activity in the case. At the same time, Attrakt also announced that Fifty Fifty would tentatively re-debut in June or July. Also, Attrakt had filed a lawsuit seeking compensation from the former members of Fifty Fifty, their parents, and the Givers' two executives Ahn Sung-il and Baek Jin-sil on the grounds that they were involved in an unjust breach of the three former members' contracts. The first hearing of this lawsuit was scheduled to begin on August 29. A 20 billion won lawsuit was also filed against Warner Music Korea for alleged attempts to poach Fifty Fifty.

On June 14, it was confirmed that Fifty Fifty would make their comeback in September as a five-member group, with four new members joining the new line-up with the current member Keena. A pre-release single was confirmed to be in production, and scheduled to be released before their official comeback date. On August 7, it was confirmed that the group would be releasing their second extended play on September 20, with a pre-release single to be released on August 30. Two days later, Chanelle Moon, Yewon, and Hana were revealed as the three of the four new members. Prior to joining the group, Yewon and Chanelle were former trainees of Belift Lab and contestants of 2023 survival show R U Next?, which formed the girl group Illit. Hana was an 18-year-old former contestant of Mnet's children's song survival program We Kid in 2016. On August 12, Athena was revealed as the final new member. Apart from announcing the new line-up of Fifty Fifty, the fandom name of the group was renamed from "Hunnies" to "Tweny", to signify the new beginning of Fifty Fifty. On August 21, Fifty Fifty and Arista Records signed a partnership.

On August 30, the pre-release single "Starry Night" for their upcoming second extended play was released. On September 2, Fifty Fifty announced the title of their second extended play to be Love Tune. On September 20, Fifty Fifty made their comeback with the release of Love Tune, along with its lead single "SOS". On October 30, the special music video of the extended play's B-side song "Gravity" was released. On December 9, the group released the digital single "Winter Glow", along with its lead song "When You Say My Name" and B-side song "Naughty or Nice".

=== 2025–present: Love Tune: Rewired, Day & Night and Imperfect-I'mperfect ===
On January 24, 2025, the group released a remix of their second extended play Love Tune titled Love Tune: Rewired. On April 7, the pre-release single "Perfect Crime" for Fifty Fifty's upcoming third extended play was released. On April 29, the group released their third extended play Day & Night, along with its double lead singles "Pookie" and "Midnight Special". In May, it was announced that Keena would be temporarily halting activities due to health reasons. On July 7, Attrakt announced that Keena will be resuming her group activities. On October 10, it was announced that Fifty Fifty would release a digital single titled "Too Much Part 1" on November 4, with the lead song "Eeny Meeny Miny Moe", its English version, and B-side song "Skittlez". On November 28, Fifty Fifty released a collaborative single with Blocks Universe titled "Making Christmas Magical".

In February 2026, the group released a cover of Pink Floyd's "Wish You Were Here", from the album of the same name, as part of a tribute project. On March 9, Attrakt announced that Hana would be going on a temporary hiatus due to health reasons. On May 4, Attrakt announced that Fifty Fifty would be releasing a new album targeted at early June as a four-member group, while Hana continues to focus on the recovery of her health. On May 11, it was confirmed that their fourth extended play Imperfect-I'mperfect would be released on June 1. The pre-release single "Starstruck" from the extended play was released on May 15.

== Members ==
Current

- Keena (키나; 2022–present)
- Chanelle Moon (샤넬문; 2024–present)
- Yewon (예원; 2024–present)
- Hana (하나; 2024–present)
- Athena (아테나; 2024–present)

Former

- Saena (새나; 2022–2023)
- Aran (아란; 2022–2023)
- Sio (시오; 2022–2023)

== Discography ==
=== Compilation albums ===
List of compilation albums, showing selected details, and selected chart positions
Title	Details	Peak chart positions
Title	Details	US World
The Beginning	Released: September 22, 2023; Label: Attrakt; Formats: CD, digital download, streaming; Track listing: 1. "Cupid" ("Twin" version); 2. "Cupid" ("Twin" version, featuring Sabrina Carpenter); 3. "Lovin' Me"; 4. "Tell Me"; 5. "Higher"; 6. "Log In"; 7. "Cupid"; 8. "Cupid" ("Twin" version, live studio ver. OT4); 9. "Lovin' Me" (live studio ver. OT4); 10. "Tell Me" (live studio ver. OT4); 11. "Cupid" ("Twin" version, sped up)	5

=== Remix albums ===
List of remix albums, showing selected details
Title	Details
Love Tune: Rewired	Released: January 24, 2025; Label: Attrakt; Formats: Digital download, streaming

=== Extended plays ===
List of extended plays, showing selected details, selected chart positions, and sales figures
Title	Details	Peak chart positions	Sales
Title	Details	KOR	Sales
The Fifty	Released: November 18, 2022; Label: Attrakt; Formats: CD, digital download, streaming; Track listing: 1. "Tell Me"; 2. "Lovin' Me"; 3. "Higher"; 4. "Log In"	44	KOR: 7,997
Love Tune	Released: September 20, 2024; Label: Attrakt, Arista; Formats: CD, digital download, streaming	11	KOR: 38,065
Day & Night	Released: April 29, 2025; Label: Attrakt; Formats: CD, digital download, streaming	3	KOR: 101,075
Imperfect-I'mperfect	Released: June 1, 2026; Label: Attrakt; Formats: CD, digital download, streaming	6	KOR: 88,303

=== Single albums ===
List of single albums, showing selected details, selected chart positions, and sales figures
Title	Details	Peak chart positions	Sales
Title	Details	KOR	Sales
The Beginning: Cupid	Released: February 24, 2023; Label: Attrakt; Formats: CD, digital download, streaming	11	KOR: 37,390

=== Singles ===
List of singles, showing year released, selected chart positions, certifications, and name of the album
Title	Year	Peak chart positions										Certification	Album
Title	Year	KOR	KOR Songs	AUS	CAN	NZ	UK	US	US World	VIE	WW	Certification	Album
"Higher"	2022	191	—	—	—	—	—	—	—	—	—	—N/a	The Fifty
"Cupid"	2023	7	3	2	6	1	8	17	2	1	2	ARIA: 2× Platinum; BPI: Platinum; MC: 3× Platinum; RMNZ: 2× Platinum	The Beginning: Cupid
"Starry Night"	2024	105	—	—	—	—	—	—	—	—	—	—N/a	Love Tune
"SOS"	2024	79	—	—	—	—	—	—	7	—	—	—N/a	Love Tune
"When You Say My Name" (Note: "When You Say My Name" was released as the lead track of the digital single "Winter Glow".)	2024	— (Note: "When You Say My Name" did not enter the Circle Digital Chart, but peaked at number 11 on the component Download Chart.)	—	—	—	—	—	—	—	—	—	—N/a	Non-album single
"Perfect Crime"	2025	— (Note: "Perfect Crime" did not enter the Circle Digital Chart, but peaked at number 9 on the component Download Chart.)	—	—	—	—	—	—	—	—	—	—N/a	Day & Night
"Pookie"	2025	33	—	—	—	—	—	—	—	—	—	—N/a	Day & Night
"Midnight Special"	2025	— (Note: "Midnight Special" did not enter the Circle Digital Chart, but peaked at number 20 on the component Download Chart.)	—	—	—	—	—	—	—	—	—	—N/a	Day & Night
"Eeny Meeny Miny Moe" (가위바위보) (Note: "Eeny Meeny Miny Moe" was released as the lead track of the digital single "Too Much Part 1".)	2025	— (Note: "Eeny Meeny Miny Moe" did not enter the Circle Digital Chart, but peaked at number 10 on the component Download Chart.)	—	—	—	—	—	—	—	—	—	—N/a	Non-album single
"Starstruck"	2026	— (Note: "Starstruck" did not enter the Circle Digital Chart, but peaked at number 43 on the component Download Chart.)	—	—	—	—	—	—	—	—	—	—N/a	Imperfect-I'mperfect
"Like a Bubble"	2026	— (Note: "Like a Bubble" did not enter the Circle Digital Chart, but peaked at number 13 on the component Download Chart.)	—	—	—	—	—	—	—	—	—	—N/a	Imperfect-I'mperfect
"—" denotes a recording that did not chart or was not released in that territory

=== Promotional singles ===
List of promotional singles, showing year released, selected chart positions, and name of the album
Title	Year	Peak chart positions		Album
Title	Year	KOR DL	NZ Hot	Album
"Barbie Dreams" (featuring Kaliii)	2023	81	18	Barbie the Album
"Take My Hand"	2025	118	—	Non-album single
"—" denotes a recording that did not chart or was not released in that territory

=== Soundtrack appearances ===
List of soundtrack appearances, showing year released, and name of the album
Title	Year	Album
"Oops, My Bad"	2025	Operation: True Love OST
"Still in Time"	2026	Spring Fever OST Part 7
"Hopping"	2026	See You at Work Tomorrow! OST Part 1
"My Wonder"	2026	See You at Work Tomorrow! OST Part 1
"Called It Love"	2026	Serena OST

=== Collaborative singles ===
List of collaborative singles, showing year released, and name of the album
Title	Year	Album
"Making Christmas Magical" (with Numberblocks, Alphablocks, Colourblocks, Wonderblocks, Blocks Universe)	2025	Non-album singles
"Say Yes!" (with Weibird) (Note: The Chinese version of "Say Yes!" was released on the same day.)	2026	Non-album singles

=== Other charted songs ===
List of other charted songs, showing year released, selected chart positions, and name of the album
Title	Year	Peak chart positions		Album
Title	Year	KOR	US Pop	Album
"Tell Me"	2022	— (Note: "Tell Me" did not enter the Circle Digital Chart, but peaked at number 127 on the component Download Chart.)	—	The Fifty
"Lovin' Me"	2022	— (Note: "Lovin' Me" did not enter the Circle Digital Chart, but peaked at number 113 on the component Download Chart.)	—	The Fifty
"Push Your Love"	2024	— (Note: "Push Your Love" did not enter the Circle Digital Chart, but peaked at number 11 on the component Download Chart.)	—	Love Tune
"Gravity"	2024	198	—	Love Tune
"Naughty or Nice" (Note: "Naughty or Nice" was released as part of the digital single "Winter Glow".)	2024	— (Note: "Naughty or Nice" did not enter the Circle Digital Chart, but peaked at number 42 on the component Download Chart.)	—	Non-album single
"Adonis"	2025	— (Note: "Adonis" did not enter the Circle Digital Chart, but peaked at number 27 on the component Download Chart.)	—	Day & Night
"Work of Art"	2025	— (Note: "Work of Art" did not enter the Circle Digital Chart, but peaked at number 28 on the component Download Chart.)	—	Day & Night
"Heartbreak"	2025	— (Note: "Heartbreak" did not enter the Circle Digital Chart, but peaked at number 25 on the component Download Chart.)	—	Day & Night
"Skittlez" (Note: "Skittlez" was released as part of the digital single "Too Much Part 1".)	2025	— (Note: "Skittlez" did not enter the Circle Digital Chart, but peaked at number 35 on the component Download Chart.)	37	Non-album singles
"Eeny Meeny Miny Moe" (가위바위보; English version) (Note: "Eeny Meeny Miny Moe" (English version) was released as part of the digital single "Too Much Part 1".)	2025	— (Note: "Eeny Meeny Miny Moe" (English version) did not enter the Circle Digital Chart, but peaked at number 92 on the component Download Chart.)	—	Non-album singles
"Took It Too Far"	2026	— (Note: "Took It Too Far" did not enter the Circle Digital Chart, but peaked at number 70 on the component Download Chart.)	—	Imperfect-I'mperfect
"Perfect"	2026	— (Note: "Perfect" did not enter the Circle Digital Chart, but peaked at number 82 on the component Download Chart.)	—	Imperfect-I'mperfect
"Genie Magic"	2026	— (Note: "Genie Magic" did not enter the Circle Digital Chart, but peaked at number 53 on the component Download Chart.)	—	Imperfect-I'mperfect
"Carry On"	2026	— (Note: "Carry On" did not enter the Circle Digital Chart, but peaked at number 77 on the component Download Chart.)	—	Imperfect-I'mperfect
"—" denotes a recording that did not chart or was not released in that territory

== Videography ==
=== Music videos ===
Title	Year	Director(s)	Ref.
"Lovin' Me"	2022	Park Byung-hak, Lee Su-jung	
"Higher"	2022	Naive Creative Production	
"Cupid"	2023	Bae Myung-hyun (Zanybros)	
"Starry Night"	2024	Kwon Young-soo (Studio Saccharin)	
"SOS"	2024	Kang Ming-yu (Gew)	
"When You Say My Name"	2024	Jimmy (VIA)	
"Pookie"	2025	Seo Dong-yeon (Flipevil)	
"Midnight Special"	2025	Danny JY Lee	
"Eeny Meeny Miny Moe" (가위바위보)	2025	Novv Kim	
"Skittlez"	2025	Yoo Jae-hyeong (Paradox Child)	
"Starstruck"	2026	Jung Joo	
"Like a Bubble"	2026	Soze (Studio Gaze)	

=== Other videos ===
Title	Year	Director(s)	Ref.
"Log In" Performance Video	2022	Jin Ju-yi, Moon Min-joo (Zanybros, Rollcam Media)	
"Tell Me" Official Lyric Video	2022	Danny JY Lee	
"What If" – Aran's Concept Film	2022	Unknown	
"What If" – Keena's Concept Film	2022	Unknown	
"What If" – Sio's Concept Film	2022	Unknown	
"What If" – Saena's Concept Film	2022	Unknown	
"Cupid" (Twin Ver.) Official Lyric Video	2023	Danny JY Lee	
"Gravity" Special Clip	2024	Aedia Studio	
"Naughty or Nice" Live Clip	2024	Lee Jae-won	

== Filmography ==
=== Web series ===
Year	Title	Ref.
2026	After School Exorcism Club	

=== Web shows ===
Year	Title	Notes	Ref.
2022–2023	Fifty Company	Premiered on November 18, 2022	
2024	Fiftime	Premiered on October 25, 2024	
2025	Fifty Trip	Season 1–4	

== Concerts and tours ==
=== Love Sprinkle Tour in USA ===
Date	City	Country	Venue	Ref.
November 27, 2024	San Francisco	United States	Palace of Fine Arts	
November 29, 2024	Los Angeles	United States	Orpheum Theatre	
December 1, 2024	Phoenix	United States	Celebrity Theatre	
December 3, 2024	Houston	United States	House of Blues	
December 5, 2024	Dallas	United States	South Side Music Hall	
December 10, 2024	Chicago	United States	Copernicus Center	
December 13, 2024	Atlanta	United States	Tabernacle	
December 16, 2024	New York	United States	Town Hall	

=== Still LoBubble Asia Fancon Tour ===
Date	City	Country	Venue	Ref.
August 1, 2026	Seoul	South Korea	Sky Art Hall	
August 11, 2026	Tokyo	Japan	Otemachi Mitsui Hall	
September 20, 2026	Manila	Philippines	Samsung Hall	
December 12, 2026	Kuala Lumpur	Malaysia	JioSpace	
December 13, 2026	Singapore		Capitol Theatre	
January 31, 2027	Taipei	Taiwan	Legacy Tera	

== Accolades ==
=== Awards and nominations ===
Name of the award ceremony, year presented, category, nominee of the award, and the result of the nomination
Award ceremony	Year	Category	Nominee / Work	Result	Ref.
Billboard Music Awards	2023	Top Duo/Group	Fifty Fifty	Nominated	
Billboard Music Awards	2023	Top Global K-pop Song	"Cupid"	Nominated	
Brand Customer Loyalty Awards (Note: Co-organized by the Korean Customers Council and Brand Keys, this event recognizes the most influential brands in society and culture, as determined through consumer research.)	2025	Female Idol (Rising Star)	Fifty Fifty	Won	
Circle Chart Music Awards	2024	Mubeat Global Choice Award – Female	Fifty Fifty	Nominated	
D Awards	2025	Discovery of the Year	Fifty Fifty	Won	
D Awards	2025	Delights Blue Label	Fifty Fifty	Won	
D Awards	2026	Delights Blue Label	Fifty Fifty	Won	
D Awards	2026	Best Choreography	"Pookie"	Won	
The Fact Music Awards	2023	Best Music – Spring	"Cupid"	Nominated	
Golden Disc Awards	2024	Rookie Artist of the Year	Fifty Fifty	Won	
Golden Disc Awards	2024	Best Digital Song (Bonsang)	"Cupid"	Nominated	
Golden Disc Awards	2024	Most Popular Artist (Female)	Fifty Fifty	Nominated	
iHeartRadio Music Awards	2024	K-pop Song of the Year	"Cupid (Twin Version)"	Won	
iHeartRadio Music Awards	2024	TikTok Bop of the Year	"Cupid (Twin Version)"	Nominated	
Korea First Brand Awards (Note: Hosted by the Korea Consumer Brand Committee and the Korea Consumer Forum, the Korea First Brand Awards bases its winners on a nationwide South Korean survey.)	2025	Female Idol (Rising Star)	Fifty Fifty	Won	
Korea Grand Music Awards	2024	IS Rising Star	Fifty Fifty	Won	
Korea Grand Music Awards	2025	Best Artist 10	Fifty Fifty	Won	
Korean Music Awards	2024	Best K-pop Song	"Cupid"	Nominated	
K-World Dream Awards	2025	New Vision	Fifty Fifty	Won	
K-World Dream Awards	2025	Best Performance	Fifty Fifty	Won	
MAMA Awards	2025	Fans' Choice Top 10 – Female	Fifty Fifty	Nominated	
Melon Music Awards	2023	Top 10 Artist	Fifty Fifty	Nominated	
MTV Europe Music Awards	2023	Best K-Pop	Fifty Fifty	Nominated	
MTV Video Music Awards	2023	Best K-Pop	"Cupid"	Nominated	
MTV Video Music Awards	2023	Group of the Year	Fifty Fifty	Nominated	
MTV Video Music Awards	2023	Song of Summer	"Cupid"	Nominated	
Seoul Music Awards	2024	Discovery of the Year	Fifty Fifty	Won	
Seoul Music Awards	2024	Main Award (Bonsang)	Fifty Fifty	Nominated	
Seoul Music Awards	2024	Hallyu Special Award	Fifty Fifty	Nominated	
Seoul Music Awards	2024	Popularity Award	Fifty Fifty	Nominated	
Seoul Music Awards	2025	Best Performance Award	Fifty Fifty	Won	
Seoul Music Awards	2025	Main Prize (Bonsang)	Fifty Fifty	Nominated	
Seoul Music Awards	2025	Popularity Award	Fifty Fifty	Nominated	
Seoul Music Awards	2025	K-Wave Special Award	Fifty Fifty	Nominated	
Seoul Music Awards	2025	K-pop World Choice – Group	Fifty Fifty	Nominated	
TikTok Awards Korea	2024	Popularity Award	Fifty Fifty	Won	
Universal Superstar Awards	2024	Universal Mega Hit Icon	Fifty Fifty	Won	

=== Listicles ===
Name of publisher, year listed, name of listicle, and placement
Publisher	Year	Listicle	Placement	Ref.
Billboard	2024	Billboard K-Pop Artist 100	10th	
Rolling Stone Korea	2024	Future of Music	Placed	
