= Cupid (Fifty Fifty song) =

- Digital cover

Single by Fifty Fifty

from the album The Beginning
- Released: February 24, 2023
- Genre: K-pop; disco-pop; synth-pop; bubblegum
- Length: 2:54
- Label: Attrakt
- Composers: Adam von Mentzer; Mac Felländer-Tsai; Louise Udin
- Lyricists: SIAHN; AHIN; Keena; von Mentzer; Felländer-Tsai; Udin
- Producers: SIAHN; von Mentzer; Felländer-Tsai; Udin

Fifty Fifty singles chronology
"Higher" (2022)	"Cupid" (2023)	"Starry Night" (2024)

Sabrina Carpenter singles chronology
"Feather" (2023)	"Cupid" (Twin version) (2023)	"You Need Me Now?" (2024)

Audio sample
- Fifty Fifty – "Cupid" (Twin version): file; help

Music video
- "Cupid" on YouTube

"Cupid" is a song recorded by South Korean girl group Fifty Fifty. It was released as The Beginning: Cupid, a single album featuring a Korean version, an English version (titled the "Twin version") sung by group members Sio and Aran, and an instrumental version of the song, on February 24, 2023, through Attrakt. It is a K-pop, disco-pop, synth-pop, and bubblegum song about a young girl's unrequited love and the shame she feels because of it.

The "Twin" version of the song became one of the first from a minor K-pop label to find global commercial success after a sped-up version of it went viral on TikTok. "Cupid" was Fifty Fifty's first entry on both the Billboard Hot 100 and the UK Singles Chart, making the group the fastest Korean musical act to enter either chart after their debut. "Cupid" peaked at number 17 on the Billboard Hot 100, where its 10-week-long chart run made it the longest-charting song by a K-pop girl group, and at number eight in the UK, where Fifty Fifty became the first K-pop girl group to reach the chart's top 10. The song also reached the top 10 of the charts in South Korea and Australia while peaking at number one on the Billboard Global Excl. U.S. chart and in New Zealand.

The song's original version as well as the "Twin" version and its remix, sped up version, and live studio version with all four members were included on the compilation album The Beginning, released on September 22, 2023.

== Background, release and promotion ==
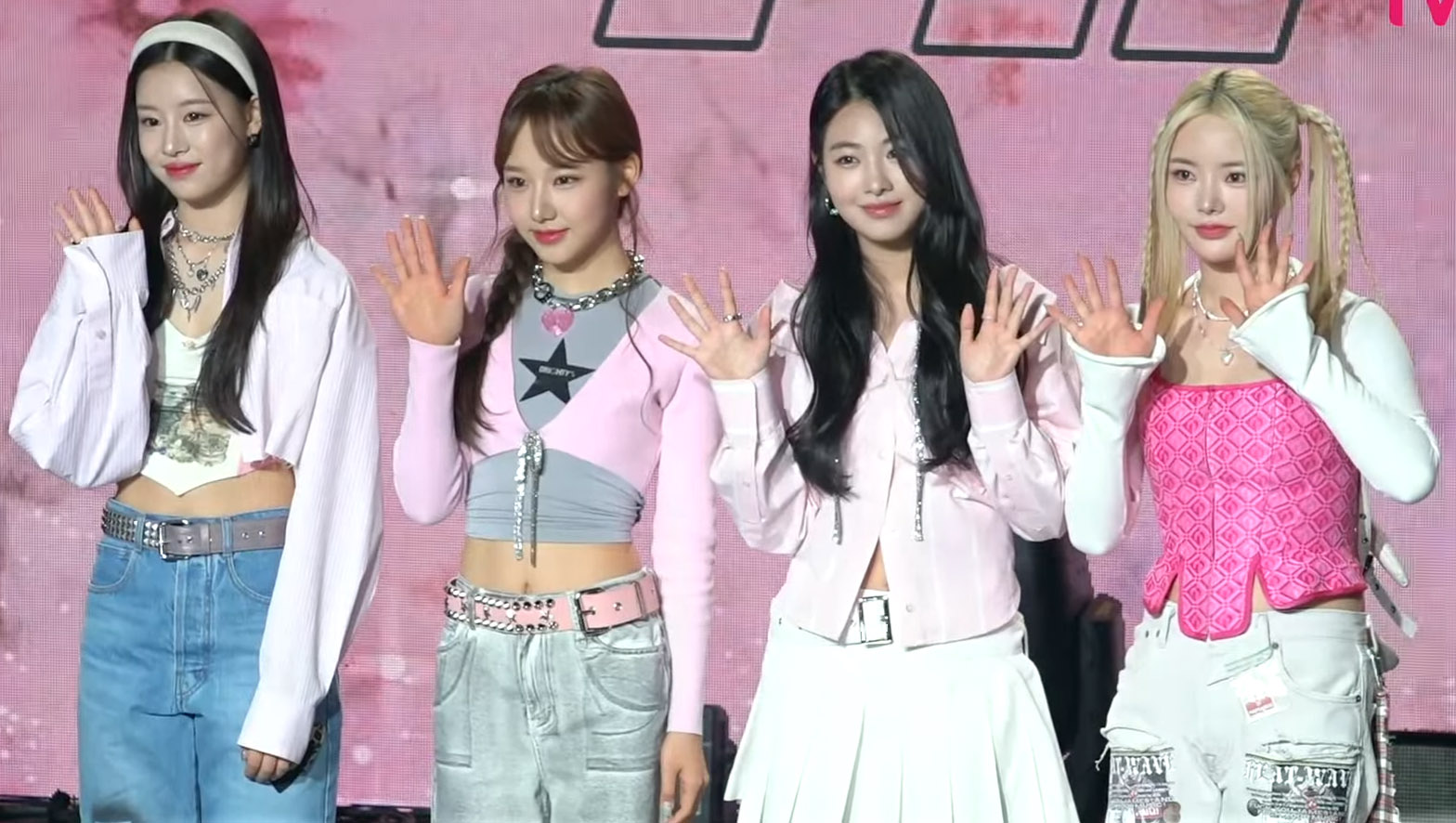
Fifty Fifty at a press conference in 2023

Fifty Fifty were trained for two years before their debut as the first idol group of independent South Korean record label Attrakt, who reached out to creative consultant Siahn and his development group The Givers to manage the group, with its lineup consisting of members Aran, Keena, Saena, and Sio. Their sound was tailored by Siahn for international audiences, including those other than K-pop fans, and intended to deviate from the norms of the K-pop industry at the time. Before releasing "Cupid", the group debuted with the extended play (EP) The Fifty, the lead single of which was "Higher", in November 2022.

On February 15, 2023, Attrakt posted a schedule on Fifty Fifty's social media accounts, announcing the upcoming release of the group's first single album on February 24. It was revealed three days later that the single album was named The Beginning: Cupid, which consists of three versions of "Cupid": its main version, sung in Korean; its "Twin version", which was sung in English and performed solely by Sio and Aran; and its instrumental. The Twin version, named as such due to it being mostly the same as the original with some changes, was intended by Siahn to make the song marketable globally. As scheduled, the single was released to various music platforms on February 24, 2023. On February 20 and 22, the music video teasers for "Cupid" were released. The music video was released on February 23, the same day where the group was performing the single for the first time on stage at M Countdown. They continued to perform "Cupid" on several music shows in the same week.

"Cupid" was produced by Siahn, written by Keena and Ahin, and composed by Swedish producers Adam von Mentzer, Mac Felländer-Tsai, and Louise Udin, all of whom also co-produced and co-arranged the song and were paid $9,000 for their contributions to the song. The song's Twin version and a user-generated sped-up version became popular on TikTok due to a dance challenge started by the group; the latter was used in more than 2.6 million videos by April 2023. By May 2023, the song had been used in eight million TikTok videos in total and gathered about 12 billion views on the platform. As a result of the viral success of the Twin version, Fifty Fifty and Attrakt signed a deal with Warner Records for global promotion in April 2023. On April 8, 2023, an official sped-up rendition of "Twin" version was released on various streaming platforms under the artist name "Sped Up 8282" through Warner. A CD of "Cupid" released in Target stores in June 2023.

In June 2023, Attrakt filed a report to the Seoul Gangnam Police Station against Siahn and three employees of the Givers, alleging that they illegally took the copyright for "Cupid" without telling Attrakt. Siahn released a statement soon after, stating that the copyright for "Cupid" belonged to the Givers before Fifty Fifty was formed as a group. A remix of the "Twin" version with Sabrina Carpenter was released on August 18, 2023.

== Composition ==
"Cupid" is written in common time in the key of D major with a tempo of 120 beats per minute, with the group's vocals ranging from a low note of G_{3} to a high note of E♭_{5}. It is a "retro"-sounding K-pop, disco-pop, synth-pop, and bubblegum song that runs for about three minutes. Its lyrics describe a young girl's unrequited crush and her feeling dumb for falling in love. They were described by Sio as being about a "pure, amateur love". In the song's chorus, the group sings, "I gave a second chance to Cupid/I believed you, I'm so stupid/Let me show you, my secret love, is it real?/Cupid is so dumb," with some lyrics in Korean. The chorus for the Twin version instead uses the lyrics "I gave a second chance to Cupid/But now I'm left here feeling stupid". The group harmonizes on the song, while the latter half of the song includes a key change and a rap verse performed by Keena; the Twin version lacks the rap verse and the key change. The instrumental features synths and guitars. Molly Raycraft of The Guardian described the song as "sweet but sardonic pop reminiscent of hits by Ariana Grande and Doja Cat" with "a nostalgic sound".

== Critical reception ==
Professional ratings
Review scores
Source	Rating
IZM	4.5/5 stars

Seung-geun So of IZM gave "Cupid" a 4.5 out of 5 stars, writing that Fifty Fifty had found their own color. Music critic Kim Yoon-ha from Yes24 noted how "Cupid" highlighted the vocals, putting them to the forefront instead of considering the voice as one of several instruments, stating that this approach reminded Kim of the Korean songs of the late 2000s rather than modern K-pop. Rolling Stone, on its mid-year list of best songs on 2023, noted the song as a "delightful in graceful simplicity, breezing by on a disco-pop groove that has the easygoing effervescence of early-2010s pop, with vocals that exude cool confidence and winning warmth, even with its busy Doja-esque rap." Billboard, when ranking the song at number ten out of fifty on a similar list, described it as "a song that seamlessly blends elements of contemporary K-pop with American girl group and bubblegum pop of the '60s." NME included it in a similar list, calling it "relatable and endearing" for portraying the emotions and the sadness for the end of a great love "without laying them on too thick".

"Cupid" was ranked at number 10 in Business Insider's list of The best K-pop songs of 2023, and number 23 in Dazed's list of the Top 50 best K-pop tracks of 2023. The Grammy Awards named it one of the 15 K-pop songs that defined the year.

== Accolades ==
Awards and nominations for "Cupid"
Award ceremony	Year	Category	Result	Ref.
Billboard Music Awards	2023	Top Global K-pop Song	Nominated	
The Fact Music Awards	2023	Best Music – Spring	Nominated	
Golden Disc Awards	2024	Best Digital Song (Bonsang)	Nominated	
iHeartRadio Music Awards	2024	K-pop Song of the Year	Won	
iHeartRadio Music Awards	2024	TikTok Bop of the Year	Nominated	
MTV Video Music Awards	2023	Best K-Pop	Nominated	
MTV Video Music Awards	2023	Song of Summer	Nominated	

== Commercial performance ==
"Cupid" was initially less successful in Fifty Fifty's home country of South Korea than it was elsewhere. It became one of the first K-pop songs not released under one of the "big four" K-pop labels—Hybe, YG, SM, JYP—to find global success. In the United States, "Cupid" initially appeared on Billboard's Bubbling Under Hot 100 chart at number 12 for the chart dated March 25, 2023, 123 days after their debut. This made Fifty Fifty the fastest K-pop girl group to appear on the chart, beating the previous record of 156 days held by NewJeans for their song "Ditto". It charted on the Billboard Hot 100 at number 100 the following week, becoming the group's first entry on the chart. They became the fastest Korean act to enter the chart and the sixth Korean group to do so after Wonder Girls, BTS, Blackpink, Twice, and NewJeans. The song peaked at number 17 on the chart dated May 20, 2023 and it became the longest-charting K-pop girl group song on the Billboard Hot 100—a record previously held by Blackpink and Selena Gomez's song "Ice Cream", which appeared on the chart for eight weeks—after charting for 15 consecutive weeks. "Cupid" also debuted at number eight on Billboard World Digital Song Sales chart during the week of March 11, 2023, making "Cupid" the fastest song to appear on any Billboard chart after its group's debut.

In the United Kingdom, "Cupid" debuted at number 96 on the UK Singles Chart, making Fifty Fifty the fastest K-pop group to enter the chart. After the song entered the top-40 of the chart to make Fifty Fifty the second K-pop girl group after Blackpink to have a song do so, "Cupid" later peaked at number eight on the chart in May 2023, making Fifty Fifty the first K-pop girl group to reach the top-10 of the chart. It spent a total of 15 weeks on the chart, surpassing "Kiss and Make Up" by Blackpink and Dua Lipa as the longest-running K-pop girl group song on the chart. The song also peaked in Australia at number two on the ARIA Singles Chart and at number one in New Zealand, both for two weeks. "Cupid" peaked at number two on the Billboard Global 200 chart, making Fifty Fifty the fifth Korean group to enter the chart's top-10 after BTS, Blackpink, Big Bang, and NewJeans. Fifty Fifty also became the third K-pop group after BTS and Blackpink to top the Billboard Global Excl. US chart with "Cupid" during the week dated May 27, 2023 and the first all-female group to top the chart with a debut song; "Cupid" remained at the top of the chart for two weeks. The Twin version of "Cupid" was also the second-fastest K-pop girl group song behind Blackpink's "Pink Venom" to reach 300 million streams on Spotify, reaching the mark within 94 days of the song's release.

On November 24, 2023, Fifty Fifty became the first K-pop girl group to enter Billboard's year-end Hot 100 songs chart, after "Cupid" ranked 44th in the list.

== Track listing ==
- CD / digital download / streaming (The Beginning: Cupid)
1. "Cupid" – 2:54
2. "Cupid" ("Twin" version) – 2:54
3. "Cupid" (instrumental) – 2:54
- Digital download / streaming (sped up version)
1. "Cupid" ("Twin" version, sped up) – 2:25
- Digital download / streaming (slowed down version)
1. "Cupid" ("Twin" version, slowed down) – 3:29
2. "Cupid" ("Twin" version) – 2:54
3. "Cupid" – 2:54
- Digital download / streaming (snack)
1. "Cupid" ("Twin" version, snack) – 0:48
2. "Cupid" ("Twin" version) – 2:54
3. "Cupid" – 2:54
- Digital download / streaming (remix)
1. "Cupid" ("Twin" version, remix featuring Sabrina Carpenter) – 2:53
2. "Cupid" ("Twin" version) – 2:54
3. "Cupid" – 2:54

== Credits and personnel ==
Credits adapted from Melon.

- Fifty Fifty – vocals
- Siahn – lyrics, production, arrangement
- Ahin – lyrics
- Keena (Fifty Fifty) – lyrics (original version)
- Adam von Mentzer – production, composition, arrangement
- Mac Felländer-Tsai – production, composition, arrangement
- Louise Udin – production, composition, arrangement
- Oh Sung-keun – mixing (at Studio-T & The Givers)
- Jeon Hoon – mastering (at Sonic Korea (assisted by Shin Soo-min))

== Charts ==
=== Weekly charts ===
Weekly chart performance for "Cupid"
Chart (2023)	Peak position
Australia (ARIA)	2
Austria (Ö3 Austria Top 40)	36
Belgium (Ultratop 50 Flanders)	39
Canada Hot 100 (Billboard)	6
Canada CHR/Top 40 (Billboard)	15
Croatia International Airplay (HRT)	92
Czech Republic Singles Digital (ČNS IFPI)	50
Estonia Airplay (TopHit)	1
France (SNEP)	96
Germany (GfK)	51
Global 200 (Billboard)	2
Greece International (IFPI)	53
Hong Kong (Billboard)	1
Hungary (Single Top 40)	17
India (Billboard)	17
India International (IMI)	1
Indonesia (Billboard)	1
Ireland (IRMA)	14
Israel International Airplay (Media Forest)	15
Japan Heatseekers (Billboard Japan)	16
Lithuania (AGATA)	16
Lithuania Airplay (TopHit)	55
Luxembourg (Billboard)	11
Malaysia (Billboard)	1
Malaysia International (RIM)	1
MENA (IFPI)	5
Netherlands (Tipparade)	6
Netherlands (Global Top 40)	6
Netherlands (Single Top 100)	57
New Zealand (Recorded Music NZ)	1
Norway (VG-lista)	17
Paraguay (Monitor Latino)	9
Philippines (Billboard)	2
Poland (Polish Streaming Top 100)	72
Portugal (AFP)	48
Singapore (RIAS)	1
Slovakia Singles Digital (ČNS IFPI)	55
South Korea (Circle)	7
South Korea (Circle) "Twin" version	78
South Korean Albums (Circle) The Beginning: Cupid	11
Sweden (Sverigetopplistan)	58
Switzerland (Schweizer Hitparade)	29
Taiwan (Billboard)	9
Turkey International Airplay (Radiomonitor Türkiye)	7
Turkey International Airplay (Radiomonitor Türkiye) "Twin" version	9
UK Singles (Official Charts)	8
UK Indie (Official Charts)	18
US Billboard Hot 100	17
US Adult Contemporary (Billboard)	20
US Adult Pop Airplay (Billboard)	9
US Dance Airplay (Billboard)	27
US Pop Airplay (Billboard)	7
US World Digital Song Sales (Billboard)	2
Vietnam (Vietnam Hot 100)	1

=== Monthly charts ===
Monthly chart performance for "Cupid"
Chart (2023)	Position
Estonia Airplay (TopHit)	2
Lithuania Airplay (TopHit)	69
Slovakia (Singles Digitál – Top 100)	92
South Korea (Circle)	9
South Korea (Circle) "Twin" version	83
South Korean Albums (Circle) The Beginning: Cupid	59

=== Year-end charts ===
Year-end chart performance for "Cupid"
Chart (2023)	Position
Australia (ARIA) Sabrina Carpenter remix	34
Canada (Canadian Hot 100)	33
Estonia Airplay (TopHit)	26
Global 200 (Billboard)	20
India International Singles (IMI)	16
New Zealand (Recorded Music NZ)	30
South Korea (Circle)	35
UK Singles (OCC)	76
US Billboard Hot 100	44
US Adult Top 40 (Billboard)	38
US Mainstream Top 40 (Billboard)	28

== Certifications ==
Certifications for "Cupid"
Region	Certification	Certified units/sales
Australia (ARIA) Sabrina Carpenter remix	2× Platinum	140,000^{‡}
Canada (Music Canada)	3× Platinum	240,000^{‡}
Denmark (IFPI Danmark)	Gold	45,000^{‡}
France (SNEP)	Gold	100,000^{‡}
New Zealand (RMNZ)	2× Platinum	60,000^{‡}
Poland (ZPAV)	Gold	25,000^{‡}
Portugal (AFP)	Gold	5,000^{‡}
Spain (Promusicae)	Gold	30,000^{‡}
United Kingdom (BPI)	Platinum	600,000^{‡}
^{‡} Sales+streaming figures based on certification alone.

== Release history ==
Release history for "Cupid"
Region	Date	Format	Version	Label(s)	Ref.
Various	February 24, 2023	Digital download; streaming	Original; Twin; Instrumental	Attrakt; Interpark; Warner Korea	
Various	March 21, 2023	CD	Original; Twin; Instrumental	Attrakt; Interpark; Warner Korea	
Various	April 10, 2023	Digital download; streaming	Twin sped-up	Attrakt; Warner Korea	
Italy	April 21, 2023	Radio airplay	Twin	Warner	
United States	May 9, 2023	Contemporary hit radio	Twin	Warner	
United States	June 5, 2023	Adult contemporary radio	Twin	Warner	
United States	June 9, 2023	CD	Original; Twin; Instrumental	Attrakt	
Various	June 16, 2023	Digital download; streaming	Twin slowed down	Attrakt; Warner Korea	
Various	June 30, 2023	Digital download; streaming	Twin snack	Attrakt; Warner Korea	
Various	August 17, 2023	Digital download; streaming	Twin remix	Attrakt; Warner Korea	
