= Attrakt =

South Korean record label

- Native name: 어트랙트
- Romanized name: eoteulaegteu
- Type: Private
- Industry: Entertainment
- Genre: K-pop
- Founded: June 17, 2021; 5 years ago
- Founder: Jeon Hong-joon
- Headquarters: Gangnam-gu, Seoul, South Korea
- Key people: Jeon Hong-joon (CEO, founder, executive director)
- Website: theattrakt.com

Attrakt (Korean: 어트랙트; RR: eoteuraegteu), stylized in all caps, is a South Korean record label formed in 2021 by Jeon Hong-joon. The label is best known for being home to the girl group Fifty Fifty and singer Bobby Kim.

== History ==
On November 14, 2022, Attrakt announced the debut of girl group Fifty Fifty by releasing the group's official logo image on their social media accounts. The same day, a pre-released music video for the song "Lovin Me" was released on their official YouTube channel. On November 15, the members were revealed through the concept photo of their debut album. A performance video of "Log In" was also released the same day. The group made their debut with the extended play (EP) The Fifty on November 18, with "Higher" serving as the lead single.

In September 2023, Evergreen Group Holdings, a Singapore company led by David Yong (a Singaporean K-pop singer), made an investment of 10 billion won (equivalent to S$10.2 million) in Attrakt with a view to collaborate with Attrakt to foster the agency's vision in the K-pop industry. The investment was said to be inconsequential with only a minimum sum being channelled to Attrakt in an update by the agency in August 2024, after it was made known that Yong was facing legal issues of his own back in Singapore.

On October 20, Attrakt and JTBC announced that they were discussing the production of a survival show to create the agency's next global girl group. It was confirmed five days later.

On February 11, 2025, Attrakt announced that singer Bobby Kim signed an exclusive contract with the label, marking him as its first soloist.

== Artists ==
=== Soloists ===
- Bobby Kim

=== Groups ===
- Fifty Fifty

== Former artists ==
- Fifty Fifty
  - Saena (2022–2023)
  - Aran (2022–2023)
  - Sio (2022–2023)

== Discography ==
=== 2022 ===
Released	Title	Artist	Type	Language
November 18	The Fifty	Fifty Fifty	EP	Korean

=== 2023 ===
Released	Title	Artist	Type	Language
February 24	The Beginning: Cupid	Fifty Fifty	Single album	Korean, English
September 22	The Beginning	Fifty Fifty	Compilation album	Korean, English

=== 2024 ===
Released	Title	Artist	Type	Language
September 20	Love Tune	Fifty Fifty	EP	Korean, English
December 9	"Winter Glow"	Fifty Fifty	Single	Korean

=== 2025 ===
Released	Title	Artist	Type	Language
January 24	Love Tune: Rewired	Fifty Fifty	Remix album	Korean, English
April 29	Day & Night	Fifty Fifty	EP	Korean, English
November 4	"Too Much Part 1"	Fifty Fifty	Single	Korean

== Legal disputes ==
=== Contractual disputes ===
==== Fifty Fifty ====
On June 19, 2023, the members of the group filed for an injunction to suspend their exclusive contracts with Attrakt, citing the violation of contractual obligations, as well as the lack of transparency in financial settlements, and medical negligence, during the group's promotions. They also filed for trademarks of the group's name and their stage names. The news of the injunction was belatedly revealed to the public after Attrakt accused Warner Music Korea and Ahn Sung-il of trying to get the members to violate their contracts to sign with another agency. While both parties denied the claim, Attrakt filed criminal charges against Ahn and three other individuals for fraud, breach of duty, and obstruction of business.

On August 28, the Seoul Central District Court sided with Attrakt against Fifty Fifty, dismissing the injunction. Fifty Fifty's law firm, Barun Law, stated that the group would immediately appeal against the dismissal.

On October 17, one of the members, Keena, withdrew her lawsuit against Attrakt and returned to her original agency. On October 23, after a four-month-long legal dispute with the members of Fifty Fifty, Attrakt announced the termination of the exclusive contracts of the three members (Saena, Aran, and Sio). On October 24, the court once again upheld the decision to dismiss the injunction.

On November 2, it was announced that The Givers' CEO, who produced Fifty Fifty's music, would be suing Attrakt for defamation.

On December 19, Attrakt filed a lawsuit damages against the three former Fifty Fifty members (Saena, Aran, and Sio), two The Givers executives, and the former members' parents. The first hearing of this lawsuit was scheduled to begin on August 29, 2024.

On March 11, 2024, the three former Fifty Fifty members lost their breach of trust claim filed against Attrakt, after the police decided to dismiss the investigations of Attrakt on charges of alleged embezzlement, having found that there was no evidence of suspected criminal activity in the case.

On October 23, Attrakt filed a lawsuit damages against Warner Music Korea for alleged attempts to poach Fifty Fifty.

On January 15, 2026, it was announced that Attrakt won some damages lawsuits against The Givers and Ahn Sung-il worth ₩499.5 million.
